= List of Jupiter trojans (Greek camp) (1–100000) =

This is a partial list of Jupiter's L_{4} trojans (60° ahead of Jupiter) with numbers 1–100000. If available, an object's mean diameter is taken from the NEOWISE data release, which the Small-Body Database has also adopted. Mean diameters are rounded to two significant figures if smaller than 100 kilometers. Estimates are in italics and calculated from a magnitude-to-diameter conversion, using an assumed albedo of 0.057.

== 1–100000 ==
This list contains 561 objects sorted in numerical order.

Designation	Discovery			Orbital description					Diam.	Remarks	Refs
Designation	Date	Observer	Site	a (AU)	e	i (°)	q (AU)	Q (AU)	Diam.	Remarks	Refs
588 Achilles	22 February 1906	M. F. Wolf	Heidelberg	5.209	0.148	10.3	4.438	5.980	130 km	–	catalog · MPC · JPL
624 Hektor	10 February 1907	A. Kopff	Heidelberg	5.267	0.023	18.2	5.148	5.386	147 km	–	catalog · MPC · JPL
659 Nestor	23 March 1908	M. F. Wolf	Heidelberg	5.166	0.117	4.5	4.561	5.771	112 km	–	catalog · MPC · JPL
911 Agamemnon	19 March 1919	K. Reinmuth	Heidelberg	5.280	0.067	21.8	4.925	5.635	131 km	–	catalog · MPC · JPL
1143 Odysseus	28 January 1930	K. Reinmuth	Heidelberg	5.241	0.092	3.1	4.761	5.722	115 km	–	catalog · MPC · JPL
1404 Ajax	17 August 1936	K. Reinmuth	Heidelberg	5.287	0.114	18.0	4.683	5.891	84 km	–	catalog · MPC · JPL
1437 Diomedes	3 August 1937	K. Reinmuth	Heidelberg	5.212	0.045	20.5	4.978	5.447	118 km	–	catalog · MPC · JPL
1583 Antilochus	19 September 1950	S. Arend	Uccle	5.140	0.054	28.5	4.865	5.416	109 km	–	catalog · MPC · JPL
1647 Menelaus	23 June 1957	S. B. Nicholson	Palomar	5.211	0.022	5.7	5.098	5.323	43 km	–	catalog · MPC · JPL
1749 Telamon	23 September 1949	K. Reinmuth	Heidelberg	5.144	0.109	6.1	4.582	5.705	65 km	–	catalog · MPC · JPL
1868 Thersites	24 September 1960	C. J. van Houten; I. van Houten-Groeneveld; T. Gehrels	Palomar	5.311	0.110	16.8	4.726	5.897	68 km	–	catalog · MPC · JPL
1869 Philoctetes	24 September 1960	C. J. van Houten; I. van Houten-Groeneveld; T. Gehrels	Palomar	5.188	0.068	4.0	4.835	5.540	23 km	–	catalog · MPC · JPL
2146 Stentor	24 October 1976	R. M. West	La Silla	5.190	0.102	39.3	4.659	5.720	51 km	–	catalog · MPC · JPL
2148 Epeios	24 October 1976	R. M. West	La Silla	5.217	0.058	9.1	4.913	5.522	38 km	–	catalog · MPC · JPL
2260 Neoptolemus	26 November 1975	Purple Mountain Observatory	Nanking	5.198	0.045	17.8	4.963	5.432	76 km	–	catalog · MPC · JPL
2456 Palamedes	30 January 1966	Purple Mountain Observatory	Nanking	5.130	0.075	13.9	4.744	5.516	66 km	–	catalog · MPC · JPL
2759 Idomeneus	14 April 1980	E. Bowell	Anderson Mesa	5.193	0.065	21.9	4.857	5.530	54 km	–	catalog · MPC · JPL
2797 Teucer	4 June 1981	E. Bowell	Anderson Mesa	5.109	0.088	22.4	4.658	5.561	89 km	–	catalog · MPC · JPL
2920 Automedon	3 May 1981	E. Bowell	Anderson Mesa	5.112	0.028	21.1	4.970	5.254	89 km	–	catalog · MPC · JPL
3063 Makhaon	4 August 1983	L. G. Karachkina	Nauchnyj	5.218	0.059	12.2	4.911	5.524	112 km	–	catalog · MPC · JPL
3391 Sinon	18 February 1977	H. Kosai; K. Furukawa	Kiso	5.298	0.084	14.9	4.854	5.743	38 km	–	catalog · MPC · JPL
3540 Protesilaos	27 October 1973	F. Börngen	Tautenburg	5.282	0.117	23.3	4.665	5.899	70 km	–	catalog · MPC · JPL
3548 Eurybates	19 September 1973	C. J. van Houten; I. van Houten-Groeneveld; T. Gehrels	Palomar	5.202	0.090	8.1	4.733	5.672	64 km	–	catalog · MPC · JPL
3564 Talthybius	15 October 1985	E. Bowell	Anderson Mesa	5.202	0.038	15.5	5.002	5.401	74 km	–	catalog · MPC · JPL
3596 Meriones	14 November 1985	P. Jensen; K. Augustesen	Brorfelde	5.178	0.074	23.5	4.792	5.564	87 km	–	catalog · MPC · JPL
3709 Polypoites	14 October 1985	C. S. Shoemaker	Palomar	5.230	0.063	19.6	4.903	5.558	65 km	–	catalog · MPC · JPL
3793 Leonteus	11 October 1985	C. S. Shoemaker	Palomar	5.221	0.090	20.9	4.751	5.691	112 km	–	catalog · MPC · JPL
3794 Sthenelos	12 October 1985	C. S. Shoemaker	Palomar	5.205	0.147	6.1	4.439	5.971	35 km	–	catalog · MPC · JPL
3801 Thrasymedes	6 November 1985	Spacewatch	Kitt Peak	5.325	0.024	28.5	5.196	5.453	34 km	–	catalog · MPC · JPL
4007 Euryalos	19 September 1973	C. J. van Houten; I. van Houten-Groeneveld; T. Gehrels	Palomar	5.182	0.057	11.0	4.887	5.478	46 km	–	catalog · MPC · JPL
4035 Thestor	22 November 1986	K. Suzuki; T. Urata	Toyota	5.281	0.058	12.1	4.976	5.586	69 km	–	catalog · MPC · JPL
4057 Demophon	15 October 1985	E. Bowell	Anderson Mesa	5.249	0.121	2.9	4.617	5.882	46 km	–	catalog · MPC · JPL
4060 Deipylos	17 December 1987	E. W. Elst; G. Pizarro	La Silla	5.242	0.156	16.2	4.424	6.059	84 km	–	catalog · MPC · JPL
4063 Euforbo	1 February 1989	Osservatorio San Vittore	Bologna	5.187	0.119	18.9	4.568	5.807	96 km	–	catalog · MPC · JPL
4068 Menestheus	19 September 1973	C. J. van Houten; I. van Houten-Groeneveld; T. Gehrels	Palomar	5.143	0.074	17.6	4.761	5.525	68 km	–	catalog · MPC · JPL
4086 Podalirius	9 November 1985	L. V. Zhuravleva	Nauchnyj	5.268	0.122	21.7	4.624	5.912	85 km	–	catalog · MPC · JPL
4138 Kalchas	19 September 1973	C. J. van Houten; I. van Houten-Groeneveld; T. Gehrels	Palomar	5.170	0.045	2.1	4.938	5.401	46 km	–	catalog · MPC · JPL
4489 Dracius	15 January 1988	E. Bowell	Anderson Mesa	5.199	0.062	22.2	4.877	5.521	77 km	–	catalog · MPC · JPL
4501 Eurypylos	4 February 1989	E. W. Elst	La Silla	5.218	0.054	8.3	4.937	5.500	46 km	–	catalog · MPC · JPL
4543 Phoinix	2 February 1989	C. S. Shoemaker	Palomar	5.135	0.097	14.7	4.635	5.635	64 km	–	catalog · MPC · JPL
4833 Meges	8 January 1989	C. S. Shoemaker	Palomar	5.231	0.093	34.7	4.744	5.717	80 km	–	catalog · MPC · JPL
4834 Thoas	11 January 1989	C. S. Shoemaker	Palomar	5.207	0.138	28.5	4.490	5.925	72 km	–	catalog · MPC · JPL
4835 Asaeus	29 January 1989	M. Iwamoto; T. Furuta	Tokushima	5.197	0.252	19.6	3.887	6.506	30 km	–	catalog · MPC · JPL
4836 Medon	2 February 1989	C. S. Shoemaker	Palomar	5.214	0.109	19.4	4.647	5.780	63 km	–	catalog · MPC · JPL
4902 Thessandrus	9 January 1989	C. S. Shoemaker	Palomar	5.203	0.044	9.1	4.975	5.431	51 km	–	catalog · MPC · JPL
4946 Askalaphus	21 January 1988	C. S. Shoemaker; E. M. Shoemaker	Palomar	5.321	0.049	21.9	5.060	5.582	48 km	–	catalog · MPC · JPL
5012 Eurymedon	17 October 1960	C. J. van Houten; I. van Houten-Groeneveld; T. Gehrels	Palomar	5.264	0.087	5.0	4.808	5.719	37 km	–	catalog · MPC · JPL
5023 Agapenor	11 October 1985	C. S. Shoemaker; E. M. Shoemaker	Palomar	5.164	0.053	11.8	4.891	5.437	28 km	–	catalog · MPC · JPL
5025 Mecisteus	5 October 1986	M. Antal	Piwnice	5.193	0.076	11.0	4.797	5.589	40 km	–	catalog · MPC · JPL
5027 Androgeos	21 January 1988	C. S. Shoemaker	Palomar	5.302	0.067	31.4	4.948	5.656	60 km	–	catalog · MPC · JPL
5028 Halaesus	23 January 1988	C. S. Shoemaker	Palomar	5.260	0.132	21.5	4.568	5.951	51 km	–	catalog · MPC · JPL
5041 Theotes	19 September 1973	C. J. van Houten; I. van Houten-Groeneveld; T. Gehrels	Palomar	5.195	0.035	10.6	5.012	5.378	42 km	–	catalog · MPC · JPL
5123 Cynus	28 January 1989	Y. Oshima	Gekko	5.228	0.103	8.5	4.689	5.767	35 km	–	catalog · MPC · JPL
5126 Achaemenides	1 February 1989	C. S. Shoemaker	Palomar	5.245	0.026	29.9	5.109	5.382	52 km	–	catalog · MPC · JPL
5209 Oloosson	13 February 1989	T. Seki	Geisei	5.203	0.051	9.0	4.937	5.470	48 km	–	catalog · MPC · JPL
5244 Amphilochos	29 September 1973	C. J. van Houten; I. van Houten-Groeneveld; T. Gehrels	Palomar	5.180	0.029	6.2	5.031	5.330	37 km	–	catalog · MPC · JPL
5254 Ulysses	7 November 1986	E. W. Elst	Haute Provence	5.226	0.123	24.2	4.584	5.867	76 km	–	catalog · MPC · JPL
5258 Rhoeo	1 January 1989	Y. Oshima	Gekko	5.166	0.078	5.9	4.763	5.570	53 km	–	catalog · MPC · JPL
5259 Epeigeus	30 January 1989	C. S. Shoemaker; E. M. Shoemaker	Palomar	5.210	0.072	15.9	4.833	5.586	45 km	–	catalog · MPC · JPL
5264 Telephus	17 May 1991	C. S. Shoemaker; E. M. Shoemaker	Palomar	5.209	0.112	33.6	4.626	5.792	68 km	–	catalog · MPC · JPL
5283 Pyrrhus	31 January 1989	C. S. Shoemaker	Palomar	5.196	0.151	17.5	4.414	5.978	48 km	–	catalog · MPC · JPL
5284 Orsilocus	1 February 1989	C. S. Shoemaker; E. M. Shoemaker	Palomar	5.226	0.084	20.2	4.784	5.667	50 km	–	catalog · MPC · JPL
5285 Krethon	9 March 1989	C. S. Shoemaker; E. M. Shoemaker	Palomar	5.186	0.051	25.2	4.922	5.450	50 km	–	catalog · MPC · JPL
5436 Eumelos	20 February 1990	C. S. Shoemaker; E. M. Shoemaker	Palomar	5.203	0.078	7.4	4.796	5.609	38 km	–	catalog · MPC · JPL
5652 Amphimachus	24 April 1992	C. S. Shoemaker; E. M. Shoemaker	Palomar	5.212	0.077	1.9	4.809	5.614	54 km	–	catalog · MPC · JPL
6090 Aulis	27 February 1989	H. Debehogne	La Silla	5.300	0.058	20.2	4.991	5.609	60 km	–	catalog · MPC · JPL
6545 Leitus	5 October 1986	M. Antal	Piwnice	5.158	0.052	12.0	4.889	5.427	51 km	–	catalog · MPC · JPL
7119 Hiera	11 January 1989	C. S. Shoemaker; E. M. Shoemaker	Palomar	5.130	0.104	19.3	4.596	5.663	59 km	–	catalog · MPC · JPL
7152 Euneus	19 September 1973	C. J. van Houten; I. van Houten-Groeneveld; T. Gehrels	Palomar	5.154	0.065	3.7	4.820	5.488	40 km	–	catalog · MPC · JPL
7214 Anticlus	19 September 1973	C. J. van Houten; I. van Houten-Groeneveld; T. Gehrels	Palomar	5.192	0.035	13.4	5.009	5.374	20 km	–	catalog · MPC · JPL
7543 Prylis	19 September 1973	C. J. van Houten; I. van Houten-Groeneveld; T. Gehrels	Palomar	5.200	0.065	14.1	4.865	5.536	43 km	–	catalog · MPC · JPL
7641 Cteatus	5 October 1986	M. Antal	Piwnice	5.216	0.054	34.7	4.934	5.498	72 km	–	catalog · MPC · JPL
8060 Anius	19 September 1973	C. J. van Houten; I. van Houten-Groeneveld; T. Gehrels	Palomar	5.203	0.093	7.1	4.719	5.688	38 km	–	catalog · MPC · JPL
8125 Tyndareus	30 September 1973	C. J. van Houten; I. van Houten-Groeneveld; T. Gehrels	Palomar	5.196	0.048	13.1	4.944	5.448	27 km	–	catalog · MPC · JPL
8241 Agrius	19 September 1973	C. J. van Houten; I. van Houten-Groeneveld; T. Gehrels	Palomar	5.157	0.043	4.3	4.936	5.378	27 km	–	catalog · MPC · JPL
8317 Eurysaces	24 September 1960	C. J. van Houten; I. van Houten-Groeneveld; T. Gehrels	Palomar	5.309	0.046	0.9	5.063	5.556	26 km	–	catalog · MPC · JPL
9431 Pytho	12 August 1996	Farra d'Isonzo	Farra d'Isonzo	5.116	0.087	21.3	4.673	5.559	38 km	–	catalog · MPC · JPL
9590 Hyria	21 February 1991	Spacewatch	Kitt Peak	5.103	0.039	6.7	4.903	5.304	22 km	–	catalog · MPC · JPL
9694 Lycomedes	26 September 1960	C. J. van Houten; I. van Houten-Groeneveld; T. Gehrels	Palomar	5.082	0.038	5.0	4.889	5.275	32 km	–	catalog · MPC · JPL
9712 Nauplius	19 September 1973	C. J. van Houten; I. van Houten-Groeneveld; T. Gehrels	Palomar	5.228	0.128	8.5	4.557	5.899	33 km	–	catalog · MPC · JPL
9713 Oceax	19 September 1973	C. J. van Houten; I. van Houten-Groeneveld; T. Gehrels	Palomar	5.172	0.055	4.2	4.887	5.458	19 km	–	catalog · MPC · JPL
9790 Deipyrus	25 July 1995	Spacewatch	Kitt Peak	5.242	0.056	5.9	4.949	5.535	33 km	–	catalog · MPC · JPL
9799 Thronium	8 September 1996	T. B. Spahr	Catalina Station	5.190	0.049	30.5	4.938	5.443	68 km	–	catalog · MPC · JPL
9807 Rhene	27 September 1997	T. Kobayashi	Oizumi	5.206	0.155	5.0	4.400	6.013	25 km	–	catalog · MPC · JPL
9817 Thersander	24 September 1960	C. J. van Houten; I. van Houten-Groeneveld; T. Gehrels	Palomar	5.255	0.043	9.2	5.031	5.480	23 km	–	catalog · MPC · JPL
9818 Eurymachos	24 September 1960	C. J. van Houten; I. van Houten-Groeneveld; T. Gehrels	Palomar	5.197	0.005	7.5	5.173	5.222	28 km	–	catalog · MPC · JPL
9828 Antimachos	19 September 1973	C. J. van Houten; I. van Houten-Groeneveld; T. Gehrels	Palomar	5.188	0.085	3.2	4.746	5.631	20 km	–	catalog · MPC · JPL
9857 Hecamede	10 March 1991	R. H. McNaught	Siding Spring	5.161	0.026	19.6	5.025	5.296	50 km	–	catalog · MPC · JPL
9907 Oileus	24 September 1960	C. J. van Houten; I. van Houten-Groeneveld; T. Gehrels	Palomar	5.273	0.069	8.2	4.912	5.635	26 km	–	catalog · MPC · JPL
10247 Amphiaraos	24 September 1960	C. J. van Houten; I. van Houten-Groeneveld; T. Gehrels	Palomar	5.278	0.007	4.2	5.240	5.316	27 km	–	catalog · MPC · JPL
10664 Phemios	25 September 1973	C. J. van Houten; I. van Houten-Groeneveld; T. Gehrels	Palomar	5.196	0.031	8.6	5.035	5.358	31 km	–	catalog · MPC · JPL
10989 Dolios	19 September 1973	C. J. van Houten; I. van Houten-Groeneveld; T. Gehrels	Palomar	5.172	0.088	10.6	4.719	5.626	24 km	–	catalog · MPC · JPL
11251 Icarion	20 September 1973	C. J. van Houten; I. van Houten-Groeneveld; T. Gehrels	Palomar	5.168	0.001	4.2	5.164	5.173	22 km	–	catalog · MPC · JPL
11252 Laertes	19 September 1973	C. J. van Houten; I. van Houten-Groeneveld; T. Gehrels	Palomar	5.140	0.031	5.9	4.978	5.301	41 km	–	catalog · MPC · JPL
11351 Leucus	12 October 1997	Beijing Schmidt CCD Asteroid Program	Xinglong	5.298	0.065	11.6	4.952	5.645	34 km	–	catalog · MPC · JPL
11395 Iphinous	15 December 1998	LINEAR	Socorro	5.214	0.068	24.1	4.862	5.567	69 km	–	catalog · MPC · JPL
(11396) 1998 XZ_{77}	15 December 1998	LINEAR	Socorro	5.215	0.065	12.6	4.876	5.553	37 km	–	catalog · MPC · JPL
(11397) 1998 XX_{93}	15 December 1998	LINEAR	Socorro	5.261	0.063	21.0	4.930	5.592	45 km	–	catalog · MPC · JPL
11428 Alcinoos	24 September 1960	C. J. van Houten; I. van Houten-Groeneveld; T. Gehrels	Palomar	5.330	0.014	17.3	5.254	5.407	32 km	–	catalog · MPC · JPL
11429 Demodokus	24 September 1960	C. J. van Houten; I. van Houten-Groeneveld; T. Gehrels	Palomar	5.236	0.031	17.1	5.072	5.400	38 km	–	catalog · MPC · JPL
11668 Balios	3 November 1997	P. Pravec	Ondrejov	5.154	0.143	4.7	4.415	5.892	25 km	–	catalog · MPC · JPL
(12054) 1997 TT_{9}	5 October 1997	L. Kotková	Ondrejov	5.155	0.065	10.1	4.821	5.489	23 km	–	catalog · MPC · JPL
12238 Actor	17 December 1987	E. W. Elst; G. Pizarro	La Silla	5.174	0.125	21.1	4.527	5.820	30 km	–	catalog · MPC · JPL
12658 Peiraios	19 September 1973	C. J. van Houten; I. van Houten-Groeneveld; T. Gehrels	Palomar	5.175	0.058	1.8	4.874	5.475	26 km	–	catalog · MPC · JPL
12714 Alkimos	15 April 1991	C. S. Shoemaker; E. M. Shoemaker	Palomar	5.239	0.037	9.5	5.047	5.431	48 km	–	catalog · MPC · JPL
12916 Eteoneus	13 October 1998	ODAS	Caussols	5.140	0.022	26.4	5.029	5.251	22 km	–	catalog · MPC · JPL
(12917) 1998 TG_{16}	13 October 1998	K. Korlević	Visnjan	5.174	0.093	11.9	4.692	5.656	25 km	–	catalog · MPC · JPL
(12921) 1998 WZ_{5}	20 November 1998	Y. Shimizu; T. Urata	Nachi-Katsuura	5.241	0.094	12.8	4.749	5.734	32 km	–	catalog · MPC · JPL
12972 Eumaios	19 September 1973	C. J. van Houten; I. van Houten-Groeneveld; T. Gehrels	Palomar	5.143	0.152	8.4	4.360	5.926	23 km	–	catalog · MPC · JPL
12973 Melanthios	19 September 1973	C. J. van Houten; I. van Houten-Groeneveld; T. Gehrels	Palomar	5.118	0.059	5.7	4.817	5.419	28 km	–	catalog · MPC · JPL
12974 Halitherses	19 September 1973	C. J. van Houten; I. van Houten-Groeneveld; T. Gehrels	Palomar	5.184	0.052	7.6	4.912	5.456	25 km	–	catalog · MPC · JPL
(13060) 1991 EJ	10 March 1991	R. H. McNaught	Siding Spring	5.148	0.124	23.0	4.510	5.786	36 km	–	catalog · MPC · JPL
13062 Podarkes	19 April 1991	C. S. Shoemaker; E. M. Shoemaker	Palomar	5.175	0.012	8.2	5.114	5.237	29 km	–	catalog · MPC · JPL
13181 Peneleos	11 September 1996	Uppsala-DLR Trojan Survey	La Silla	5.219	0.137	2.5	4.504	5.934	21 km	–	catalog · MPC · JPL
(13182) 1996 SO_{8}	16 September 1996	Uppsala-DLR Trojan Survey	La Silla	5.214	0.114	5.1	4.621	5.807	31 km	–	catalog · MPC · JPL
(13183) 1996 TW	5 October 1996	D. di Cicco	Sudbury	5.221	0.091	17.9	4.749	5.694	41 km	–	catalog · MPC · JPL
13184 Augeias	4 October 1996	E. W. Elst	La Silla	5.177	0.049	4.5	4.921	5.433	34 km	–	catalog · MPC · JPL
13185 Agasthenes	5 October 1996	E. W. Elst	La Silla	5.197	0.055	9.1	4.909	5.485	15 km	–	catalog · MPC · JPL
13229 Echion	2 November 1997	J. Tichá; M. Tichý	Klet	5.261	0.075	3.8	4.869	5.654	28 km	–	catalog · MPC · JPL
(13230) 1997 VG_{1}	1 November 1997	T. Urata	Oohira	5.081	0.062	4.3	4.766	5.395	24 km	–	catalog · MPC · JPL
(13323) 1998 SQ	16 September 1998	ODAS	Caussols	5.082	0.092	0.9	4.616	5.548	23 km	–	catalog · MPC · JPL
(13331) 1998 SU_{52}	30 September 1998	Spacewatch	Kitt Peak	5.074	0.110	2.3	4.517	5.631	18 km	–	catalog · MPC · JPL
(13353) 1998 TU_{12}	13 October 1998	Spacewatch	Kitt Peak	5.173	0.134	15.4	4.481	5.866	24 km	–	catalog · MPC · JPL
(13362) 1998 UQ_{16}	26 October 1998	K. Korlević	Visnjan	5.179	0.028	9.3	5.037	5.322	28 km	–	catalog · MPC · JPL
(13366) 1998 US24	18 October 1998	LONEOS	Anderson Mesa	5.223	0.105	6.6	4.673	5.773	33 km	–	catalog · MPC · JPL
(13372) 1998 VU_{6}	12 November 1998	T. Kobayashi	Oizumi	5.240	0.048	7.3	4.987	5.494	25 km	–	catalog · MPC · JPL
(13379) 1998 WX_{9}	18 November 1998	LINEAR	Socorro	5.158	0.066	4.9	4.819	5.498	21 km	–	catalog · MPC · JPL
(13383) 1998 XS_{31}	14 December 1998	LINEAR	Socorro	5.161	0.065	6.4	4.823	5.498	24 km	–	catalog · MPC · JPL
(13385) 1998 XO_{79}	15 December 1998	LINEAR	Socorro	5.233	0.046	14.0	4.993	5.473	36 km	–	catalog · MPC · JPL
13387 Irus	22 December 1998	Farra d'Isonzo	Farra d'Isonzo	5.203	0.097	7.2	4.699	5.707	19 km	–	catalog · MPC · JPL
13463 Antiphos	25 September 1973	C. J. van Houten; I. van Houten-Groeneveld; T. Gehrels	Palomar	5.191	0.008	10.5	5.150	5.232	25 km	–	catalog · MPC · JPL
13475 Orestes	19 September 1973	C. J. van Houten; I. van Houten-Groeneveld; T. Gehrels	Palomar	5.178	0.075	7.9	4.792	5.564	22 km	–	catalog · MPC · JPL
13650 Perimedes	4 October 1996	E. W. Elst	La Silla	5.225	0.098	10.7	4.713	5.737	22 km	–	catalog · MPC · JPL
(13694) 1997 WW_{7}	23 November 1997	N. Satō	Chichibu	5.265	0.071	5.6	4.894	5.636	29 km	–	catalog · MPC · JPL
(13780) 1998 UZ_{8}	17 October 1998	Beijing Schmidt CCD Asteroid Program	Xinglong	5.156	0.097	8.3	4.654	5.658	22 km	–	catalog · MPC · JPL
(13782) 1998 UM_{18}	28 October 1998	CSS	Catalina	5.184	0.134	28.6	4.487	5.881	25 km	–	catalog · MPC · JPL
(13790) 1998 UF_{31}	17 October 1998	Beijing Schmidt CCD Asteroid Program	Xinglong	5.272	0.113	8.0	4.678	5.867	19 km	–	catalog · MPC · JPL
13862 Elais	8 December 1999	LINEAR	Socorro	5.269	0.086	8.4	4.814	5.725	25 km	–	catalog · MPC · JPL
(14235) 1999 XA_{187}	12 December 1999	LINEAR	Socorro	5.140	0.085	8.7	4.701	5.578	29 km	–	catalog · MPC · JPL
(14268) 2000 AK_{156}	3 January 2000	LINEAR	Socorro	5.214	0.092	15.0	4.734	5.694	34 km	–	catalog · MPC · JPL
(14518) 1996 RZ_{30}	13 September 1996	Uppsala-DLR Trojan Survey	La Silla	5.265	0.146	6.5	4.496	6.033	17 km	–	catalog · MPC · JPL
(14690) 2000 AR_{25}	3 January 2000	LINEAR	Socorro	5.211	0.032	4.4	5.043	5.378	43 km	–	catalog · MPC · JPL
(14707) 2000 CC_{20}	2 February 2000	LINEAR	Socorro	5.239	0.042	13.7	5.020	5.458	26 km	–	catalog · MPC · JPL
14791 Atreus	19 September 1973	C. J. van Houten; I. van Houten-Groeneveld; T. Gehrels	Palomar	5.147	0.162	2.9	4.314	5.981	22 km	–	catalog · MPC · JPL
14792 Thyestes	24 September 1973	C. J. van Houten; I. van Houten-Groeneveld; T. Gehrels	Palomar	5.179	0.084	11.4	4.744	5.614	19 km	–	catalog · MPC · JPL
(15033) 1998 VY_{29}	10 November 1998	LINEAR	Socorro	5.177	0.204	12.0	4.123	6.231	33 km	–	catalog · MPC · JPL
15094 Polymele	17 November 1999	CSS	Catalina	5.176	0.096	13.0	4.678	5.674	21 km	–	catalog · MPC · JPL
(15398) 1997 UZ_{23}	30 October 1997	B. A. Skiff	Anderson Mesa	5.132	0.026	28.5	5.001	5.264	36 km	–	catalog · MPC · JPL
15436 Dexius	10 November 1998	LINEAR	Socorro	5.211	0.045	16.3	4.976	5.447	88 km	–	catalog · MPC · JPL
15440 Eioneus	19 November 1998	CSS	Catalina	5.294	0.023	28.8	5.170	5.417	63 km	–	catalog · MPC · JPL
(15442) 1998 WN_{11}	21 November 1998	LINEAR	Socorro	5.186	0.169	4.5	4.312	6.061	22 km	–	catalog · MPC · JPL
(15521) 1999 XH_{133}	12 December 1999	LINEAR	Socorro	5.244	0.070	10.7	4.879	5.608	28 km	–	catalog · MPC · JPL
(15527) 1999 YY_{2}	16 December 1999	LINEAR	Socorro	5.212	0.155	21.3	4.406	6.017	36 km	–	catalog · MPC · JPL
(15529) 2000 AA_{80}	5 January 2000	LINEAR	Socorro	5.262	0.025	5.1	5.129	5.396	16 km	–	catalog · MPC · JPL
(15535) 2000 AT_{177}	7 January 2000	LINEAR	Socorro	5.182	0.085	13.2	4.742	5.623	40 km	–	catalog · MPC · JPL
(15536) 2000 AG_{191}	8 January 2000	LINEAR	Socorro	5.208	0.144	14.7	4.457	5.958	29 km	–	catalog · MPC · JPL
(15539) 2000 CN_{3}	2 February 2000	LINEAR	Socorro	5.269	0.046	27.9	5.028	5.509	42 km	–	catalog · MPC · JPL
15651 Tlepolemos	22 October 1960	C. J. van Houten; I. van Houten-Groeneveld; T. Gehrels	Palomar	5.303	0.041	3.0	5.084	5.523	24 km	–	catalog · MPC · JPL
15663 Periphas	29 September 1973	C. J. van Houten; I. van Houten-Groeneveld; T. Gehrels	Palomar	5.198	0.106	33.9	4.650	5.747	36 km	–	catalog · MPC · JPL
15913 Telemachus	1 October 1997	Uppsala-DLR Trojan Survey	La Silla	5.192	0.061	7.2	4.876	5.509	17 km	–	catalog · MPC · JPL
(16099) 1999 VQ_{24}	15 November 1999	P. Kušnirák; P. Pravec	Ondrejov	5.187	0.083	13.5	4.757	5.618	37 km	–	catalog · MPC · JPL
(16152) 1999 YN_{12}	30 December 1999	L. Tesi; M. Tombelli	San Marcello	5.134	0.096	3.5	4.639	5.628	16 km	–	catalog · MPC · JPL
16974 Iphthime	18 November 1998	LINEAR	Socorro	5.180	0.071	15.0	4.813	5.547	57 km	–	catalog · MPC · JPL
17351 Pheidippos	19 September 1973	C. J. van Houten; I. van Houten-Groeneveld; T. Gehrels	Palomar	5.160	0.098	15.3	4.655	5.665	29 km	–	catalog · MPC · JPL
(17874) 1998 YM_{3}	17 December 1998	T. Kobayashi	Oizumi	5.236	0.046	2.5	4.995	5.477	17 km	–	catalog · MPC · JPL
(18058) 1999 XY_{129}	12 December 1999	LINEAR	Socorro	5.117	0.080	9.1	4.705	5.528	21 km	–	catalog · MPC · JPL
18060 Zarex	8 December 1999	LINEAR	Socorro	5.124	0.058	6.6	4.827	5.420	36 km	–	catalog · MPC · JPL
(18062) 1999 XY_{187}	12 December 1999	LINEAR	Socorro	5.147	0.050	17.4	4.889	5.404	30 km	–	catalog · MPC · JPL
(18063) 1999 XW_{211}	13 December 1999	LINEAR	Socorro	5.157	0.058	18.0	4.857	5.456	31 km	–	catalog · MPC · JPL
(18071) 2000 BA_{27}	30 January 2000	LINEAR	Socorro	5.294	0.057	3.6	4.990	5.598	22 km	–	catalog · MPC · JPL
18263 Anchialos	25 September 1973	C. J. van Houten; I. van Houten-Groeneveld; T. Gehrels	Palomar	5.198	0.040	10.6	4.990	5.405	21 km	–	catalog · MPC · JPL
(19725) 1999 WT_{4}	28 November 1999	T. Kobayashi	Oizumi	5.146	0.074	10.0	4.765	5.526	32 km	–	catalog · MPC · JPL
19913 Aigyptios	19 September 1973	C. J. van Houten; I. van Houten-Groeneveld; T. Gehrels	Palomar	5.114	0.059	7.1	4.813	5.416	25 km	–	catalog · MPC · JPL
(20144) 1996 RA_{33}	15 September 1996	Uppsala-DLR Trojan Survey	La Silla	5.190	0.011	9.4	5.134	5.247	27 km	–	catalog · MPC · JPL
(20424) 1998 VF_{30}	10 November 1998	LINEAR	Socorro	5.208	0.131	25.6	4.527	5.889	46 km	–	catalog · MPC · JPL
(20428) 1998 WG_{20}	18 November 1998	LINEAR	Socorro	5.199	0.147	21.0	4.434	5.963	27 km	–	catalog · MPC · JPL
(20716) 1999 XG_{91}	7 December 1999	LINEAR	Socorro	5.230	0.129	26.9	4.553	5.906	26 km	–	catalog · MPC · JPL
(20720) 1999 XP_{101}	7 December 1999	LINEAR	Socorro	5.284	0.147	18.2	4.509	6.059	34 km	–	catalog · MPC · JPL
(20729) 1999 XS143	15 December 1999	C. W. Juels	Fountain Hills	5.218	0.065	22.0	4.878	5.559	51 km	–	catalog · MPC · JPL
(20738) 1999 XG_{191}	12 December 1999	LINEAR	Socorro	5.163	0.013	12.5	5.097	5.230	25 km	–	catalog · MPC · JPL
(20739) 1999 XM_{193}	12 December 1999	LINEAR	Socorro	5.207	0.137	12.1	4.493	5.921	27 km	–	catalog · MPC · JPL
20947 Polyneikes	29 September 1973	C. J. van Houten; I. van Houten-Groeneveld; T. Gehrels	Palomar	5.069	0.025	2.3	4.942	5.195	23 km	–	catalog · MPC · JPL
20952 Tydeus	25 September 1973	C. J. van Houten; I. van Houten-Groeneveld; T. Gehrels	Palomar	5.166	0.086	10.0	4.721	5.610	25 km	–	catalog · MPC · JPL
20961 Arkesilaos	19 September 1973	C. J. van Houten; I. van Houten-Groeneveld; T. Gehrels	Palomar	5.142	0.019	9.2	5.045	5.240	23 km	–	catalog · MPC · JPL
(20995) 1985 VY	1 November 1985	R. M. West	La Silla	5.094	0.115	20.4	4.506	5.682	26 km	–	catalog · MPC · JPL
(21271) 1996 RF_{33}	15 September 1996	Uppsala-DLR Trojan Survey	La Silla	5.147	0.008	6.7	5.108	5.187	21 km	–	catalog · MPC · JPL
21284 Pandion	5 October 1996	E. W. Elst	La Silla	5.217	0.103	7.0	4.682	5.752	29 km	–	catalog · MPC · JPL
(21370) 1997 TB_{28}	1 October 1997	Uppsala-DLR Trojan Survey	La Silla	5.194	0.074	7.8	4.811	5.578	29 km	–	catalog · MPC · JPL
(21371) 1997 TD_{28}	1 October 1997	Uppsala-DLR Trojan Survey	La Silla	5.226	0.072	7.9	4.848	5.604	23 km	–	catalog · MPC · JPL
(21372) 1997 TM_{28}	6 October 1997	Uppsala-DLR Trojan Survey	La Silla	5.191	0.029	11.1	5.039	5.344	24 km	–	catalog · MPC · JPL
(21593) 1998 VL_{27}	10 November 1998	LINEAR	Socorro	5.096	0.051	3.4	4.834	5.358	22 km	–	catalog · MPC · JPL
(21595) 1998 WJ_{5}	18 November 1998	CSS	Catalina	5.206	0.136	25.1	4.500	5.911	35 km	–	catalog · MPC · JPL
(21599) 1998 WA_{15}	21 November 1998	LINEAR	Socorro	5.205	0.118	11.2	4.593	5.816	28 km	–	catalog · MPC · JPL
(21601) 1998 XO89	15 December 1998	LINEAR	Socorro	5.234	0.036	19.5	5.047	5.421	55 km	–	catalog · MPC · JPL
21602 Ialmenus	17 December 1998	M. Tichý; Z. Moravec	Klet	5.214	0.061	7.9	4.898	5.529	16 km	–	catalog · MPC · JPL
21900 Orus	9 November 1999	T. Kobayashi	Oizumi	5.124	0.038	8.5	4.931	5.317	51 km	–	catalog · MPC · JPL
(22008) 1999 XM_{71}	7 December 1999	LINEAR	Socorro	5.144	0.011	4.3	5.087	5.200	25 km	–	catalog · MPC · JPL
(22009) 1999 XK_{77}	7 December 1999	LINEAR	Socorro	5.214	0.028	5.6	5.067	5.360	22 km	–	catalog · MPC · JPL
22010 Kuzmina	7 December 1999	LINEAR	Socorro	5.094	0.017	1.4	5.007	5.180	19 km	–	catalog · MPC · JPL
(22012) 1999 XO_{82}	7 December 1999	LINEAR	Socorro	5.193	0.111	7.4	4.617	5.770	23 km	–	catalog · MPC · JPL
(22014) 1999 XQ_{96}	7 December 1999	LINEAR	Socorro	5.153	0.107	29.6	4.604	5.702	39 km	–	catalog · MPC · JPL
(22035) 1999 XR_{170}	10 December 1999	LINEAR	Socorro	5.206	0.100	16.4	4.685	5.728	24 km	–	catalog · MPC · JPL
(22041) 1999 XK_{192}	12 December 1999	LINEAR	Socorro	5.155	0.056	10.2	4.867	5.443	22 km	–	catalog · MPC · JPL
(22042) 1999 XP_{194}	12 December 1999	LINEAR	Socorro	5.170	0.093	6.9	4.688	5.652	20 km	–	catalog · MPC · JPL
(22049) 1999 XW_{257}	7 December 1999	LINEAR	Socorro	5.217	0.061	2.6	4.900	5.534	19 km	–	catalog · MPC · JPL
(22052) 2000 AQ_{14}	3 January 2000	LINEAR	Socorro	5.179	0.037	11.9	4.987	5.371	28 km	–	catalog · MPC · JPL
(22054) 2000 AP_{21}	3 January 2000	LINEAR	Socorro	5.199	0.053	20.9	4.925	5.474	34 km	–	catalog · MPC · JPL
(22055) 2000 AS_{25}	3 January 2000	LINEAR	Socorro	5.259	0.026	11.0	5.123	5.394	32 km	–	catalog · MPC · JPL
(22056) 2000 AU_{31}	3 January 2000	LINEAR	Socorro	5.147	0.147	7.2	4.392	5.901	25 km	–	catalog · MPC · JPL
(22059) 2000 AD_{75}	5 January 2000	LINEAR	Socorro	5.192	0.109	7.8	4.625	5.759	25 km	–	catalog · MPC · JPL
(22149) 2000 WD49	21 November 2000	LINEAR	Socorro	5.167	0.044	21.5	4.937	5.397	48 km	–	catalog · MPC · JPL
22199 Klonios	24 September 1960	C. J. van Houten; I. van Houten-Groeneveld; T. Gehrels	Palomar	5.298	0.082	9.1	4.861	5.734	25 km	–	catalog · MPC · JPL
22203 Prothoenor	24 September 1960	C. J. van Houten; I. van Houten-Groeneveld; T. Gehrels	Palomar	5.201	0.100	1.4	4.680	5.722	25 km	–	catalog · MPC · JPL
22222 Hodios	30 September 1973	C. J. van Houten; I. van Houten-Groeneveld; T. Gehrels	Palomar	5.072	0.045	2.4	4.844	5.301	18 km	–	catalog · MPC · JPL
22227 Polyxenos	25 September 1973	C. J. van Houten; I. van Houten-Groeneveld; T. Gehrels	Palomar	5.227	0.135	11.0	4.523	5.930	22 km	–	catalog · MPC · JPL
(22404) 1995 ME_{4}	29 June 1995	Spacewatch	Kitt Peak	5.269	0.122	9.3	4.628	5.909	21 km	–	catalog · MPC · JPL
22503 Thalpius	7 October 1997	M. Tichý; Z. Moravec	Klet	5.219	0.070	9.9	4.853	5.585	16 km	–	catalog · MPC · JPL
(23075) 1999 XV_{83}	7 December 1999	LINEAR	Socorro	5.198	0.172	14.4	4.302	6.094	34 km	–	catalog · MPC · JPL
(23114) 2000 AL_{16}	3 January 2000	LINEAR	Socorro	5.190	0.054	2.0	4.911	5.469	21 km	–	catalog · MPC · JPL
(23118) 2000 AU_{27}	3 January 2000	LINEAR	Socorro	5.181	0.205	3.7	4.120	6.242	20 km	–	catalog · MPC · JPL
(23119) 2000 AP_{33}	3 January 2000	LINEAR	Socorro	5.256	0.133	18.4	4.558	5.953	33 km	–	catalog · MPC · JPL
(23123) 2000 AU_{57}	4 January 2000	LINEAR	Socorro	5.339	0.059	8.5	5.023	5.656	26 km	–	catalog · MPC · JPL
(23126) 2000 AK_{95}	4 January 2000	LINEAR	Socorro	5.246	0.029	1.2	5.096	5.396	23 km	–	catalog · MPC · JPL
23135 Pheidas	7 January 2000	LINEAR	Socorro	5.266	0.050	17.4	5.001	5.532	66 km	–	catalog · MPC · JPL
(23144) 2000 AY_{182}	7 January 2000	LINEAR	Socorro	5.252	0.069	9.4	4.887	5.616	19 km	–	catalog · MPC · JPL
(23152) 2000 CS_{8}	2 February 2000	LINEAR	Socorro	5.215	0.152	11.4	4.425	6.005	19 km	–	catalog · MPC · JPL
(23269) 2000 YH_{62}	30 December 2000	LINEAR	Socorro	5.215	0.023	8.7	5.097	5.332	24 km	–	catalog · MPC · JPL
(23285) 2000 YH_{119}	29 December 2000	LONEOS	Anderson Mesa	5.109	0.056	16.6	4.822	5.396	30 km	–	catalog · MPC · JPL
23355 Elephenor	17 October 1960	C. J. van Houten; I. van Houten-Groeneveld; T. Gehrels	Palomar	5.245	0.062	7.1	4.921	5.570	22 km	–	catalog · MPC · JPL
23382 Epistrophos	30 September 1973	C. J. van Houten; I. van Houten-Groeneveld; T. Gehrels	Palomar	5.223	0.105	15.0	4.673	5.774	24 km	–	catalog · MPC · JPL
23383 Schedios	25 September 1973	C. J. van Houten; I. van Houten-Groeneveld; T. Gehrels	Palomar	5.186	0.110	10.8	4.614	5.759	23 km	–	catalog · MPC · JPL
(23480) 1991 EL	10 March 1991	R. H. McNaught	Siding Spring	5.206	0.085	22.5	4.761	5.651	28 km	–	catalog · MPC · JPL
(23622) 1996 RW_{29}	12 September 1996	Uppsala-DLR Trojan Survey	La Silla	5.126	0.034	13.0	4.951	5.300	21 km	–	catalog · MPC · JPL
(23624) 1996 UX_{3}	29 October 1996	Beijing Schmidt CCD Asteroid Program	Xinglong	5.228	0.162	19.9	4.379	6.077	27 km	–	catalog · MPC · JPL
(23706) 1997 SY_{32}	29 September 1997	Spacewatch	Kitt Peak	5.245	0.092	6.8	4.765	5.726	14 km	–	catalog · MPC · JPL
(23709) 1997 TA_{28}	1 October 1997	Uppsala-DLR Trojan Survey	La Silla	5.155	0.084	10.7	4.719	5.590	20 km	–	catalog · MPC · JPL
(23710) 1997 UJ	20 October 1997	L. Kotková	Ondrejov	5.183	0.063	11.1	4.857	5.510	17 km	–	catalog · MPC · JPL
(23939) 1998 TV_{33}	14 October 1998	LONEOS	Anderson Mesa	5.094	0.043	9.9	4.875	5.312	24 km	–	catalog · MPC · JPL
(23947) 1998 UH_{16}	23 October 1998	ODAS	Caussols	5.258	0.066	3.6	4.909	5.606	19 km	–	catalog · MPC · JPL
(23958) 1998 VD30	10 November 1998	LINEAR	Socorro	5.231	0.100	24.9	4.709	5.754	46 km	–	catalog · MPC · JPL
(23963) 1998 WY_{8}	18 November 1998	N. Satō	Chichibu	5.204	0.089	4.1	4.739	5.668	20 km	–	catalog · MPC · JPL
(23968) 1998 XA_{13}	8 December 1998	ODAS	Caussols	5.255	0.162	12.5	4.404	6.105	31 km	–	catalog · MPC · JPL
(23970) 1998 YP_{6}	21 December 1998	ODAS	Caussols	5.266	0.067	32.1	4.913	5.618	32 km	–	catalog · MPC · JPL
(24212) 1999 XW_{59}	7 December 1999	LINEAR	Socorro	5.066	0.043	7.2	4.845	5.286	21 km	–	catalog · MPC · JPL
(24225) 1999 XV_{80}	7 December 1999	LINEAR	Socorro	5.156	0.039	11.2	4.955	5.356	15 km	–	catalog · MPC · JPL
(24233) 1999 XD_{94}	7 December 1999	LINEAR	Socorro	5.297	0.040	11.7	5.084	5.509	23 km	–	catalog · MPC · JPL
(24244) 1999 XY_{101}	7 December 1999	LINEAR	Socorro	5.192	0.046	29.2	4.954	5.430	35 km	–	catalog · MPC · JPL
(24275) 1999 XW_{167}	10 December 1999	LINEAR	Socorro	5.122	0.044	12.6	4.897	5.347	28 km	–	catalog · MPC · JPL
(24279) 1999 XR_{171}	10 December 1999	LINEAR	Socorro	5.180	0.075	10.8	4.793	5.566	20 km	–	catalog · MPC · JPL
(24312) 1999 YO_{22}	31 December 1999	LONEOS	Anderson Mesa	5.249	0.106	16.7	4.692	5.806	26 km	–	catalog · MPC · JPL
(24313) 1999 YR_{27}	30 December 1999	LINEAR	Socorro	5.264	0.086	18.2	4.809	5.719	35 km	–	catalog · MPC · JPL
(24340) 2000 AP_{84}	5 January 2000	LINEAR	Socorro	5.220	0.149	6.1	4.440	5.999	19 km	–	catalog · MPC · JPL
(24341) 2000 AJ_{87}	5 January 2000	LINEAR	Socorro	5.253	0.066	14.2	4.905	5.602	16 km	–	catalog · MPC · JPL
(24357) 2000 AC_{115}	5 January 2000	LINEAR	Socorro	5.323	0.063	8.8	4.987	5.659	22 km	–	catalog · MPC · JPL
24380 Dorippe	3 January 2000	LINEAR	Socorro	5.261	0.083	7.2	4.824	5.697	32 km	–	catalog · MPC · JPL
(24390) 2000 AD_{177}	7 January 2000	LINEAR	Socorro	5.259	0.056	12.6	4.964	5.554	25 km	–	catalog · MPC · JPL
(24403) 2000 AX_{193}	8 January 2000	LINEAR	Socorro	5.278	0.029	22.5	5.127	5.429	29 km	–	catalog · MPC · JPL
24420 Thasos	29 January 2000	Spacewatch	Kitt Peak	5.296	0.058	8.5	4.987	5.605	22 km	–	catalog · MPC · JPL
24426 Belova	2 February 2000	LINEAR	Socorro	5.292	0.085	7.4	4.840	5.743	14 km	–	catalog · MPC · JPL
(24479) 2000 WU_{157}	30 November 2000	LINEAR	Socorro	5.162	0.088	21.7	4.708	5.616	24 km	–	catalog · MPC · JPL
(24485) 2000 YL_{102}	28 December 2000	LINEAR	Socorro	5.145	0.043	13.3	4.926	5.364	26 km	–	catalog · MPC · JPL
(24486) 2000 YR_{102}	28 December 2000	LINEAR	Socorro	5.180	0.076	8.3	4.785	5.576	33 km	–	catalog · MPC · JPL
(24498) 2001 AC_{25}	4 January 2001	LINEAR	Socorro	5.246	0.036	13.0	5.057	5.434	22 km	–	catalog · MPC · JPL
(24501) 2001 AN_{37}	5 January 2001	LINEAR	Socorro	5.186	0.106	20.3	4.638	5.734	25 km	–	catalog · MPC · JPL
(24505) 2001 BZ	17 January 2001	T. Kobayashi	Oizumi	5.240	0.050	17.4	4.980	5.500	32 km	–	catalog · MPC · JPL
(24506) 2001 BS_{15}	21 January 2001	T. Kobayashi	Oizumi	5.323	0.030	11.8	5.161	5.484	39 km	–	catalog · MPC · JPL
(24508) 2001 BL_{26}	20 January 2001	LINEAR	Socorro	5.216	0.080	2.4	4.798	5.635	20 km	–	catalog · MPC · JPL
(24519) 2001 CH	1 February 2001	K. Korlević	Visnjan	5.220	0.088	13.5	4.763	5.678	26 km	–	catalog · MPC · JPL
(24528) 2001 CP_{11}	1 February 2001	LINEAR	Socorro	5.250	0.107	16.7	4.688	5.812	25 km	–	catalog · MPC · JPL
(24530) 2001 CP_{18}	2 February 2001	LINEAR	Socorro	5.141	0.119	11.4	4.528	5.755	26 km	–	catalog · MPC · JPL
(24531) 2001 CE_{21}	2 February 2001	LINEAR	Socorro	5.238	0.090	22.5	4.768	5.708	21 km	–	catalog · MPC · JPL
(24534) 2001 CX_{27}	2 February 2001	LONEOS	Anderson Mesa	5.211	0.083	13.1	4.777	5.645	30 km	–	catalog · MPC · JPL
(24536) 2001 CN_{33}	13 February 2001	LINEAR	Socorro	5.207	0.064	25.9	4.874	5.540	27 km	–	catalog · MPC · JPL
(24537) 2001 CB_{35}	13 February 2001	LINEAR	Socorro	5.173	0.083	18.3	4.744	5.602	31 km	–	catalog · MPC · JPL
(24539) 2001 DP_{5}	16 February 2001	LINEAR	Socorro	5.313	0.085	11.0	4.861	5.765	15 km	–	catalog · MPC · JPL
24587 Kapaneus	30 September 1973	C. J. van Houten; I. van Houten-Groeneveld; T. Gehrels	Palomar	5.184	0.010	29.0	5.132	5.236	26 km	–	catalog · MPC · JPL
24603 Mekistheus	24 September 1973	C. J. van Houten; I. van Houten-Groeneveld; T. Gehrels	Palomar	5.158	0.132	6.6	4.478	5.839	18 km	–	catalog · MPC · JPL
(24882) 1996 RK_{30}	13 September 1996	Uppsala-DLR Trojan Survey	La Silla	5.198	0.062	7.1	4.874	5.522	19 km	–	catalog · MPC · JPL
(25895) 2000 XN_{9}	1 December 2000	LINEAR	Socorro	5.217	0.075	21.6	4.826	5.607	33 km	–	catalog · MPC · JPL
(25910) 2001 BM_{50}	25 January 2001	LINEAR	Socorro	5.190	0.025	19.6	5.060	5.319	25 km	–	catalog · MPC · JPL
(25911) 2001 BC_{76}	26 January 2001	LINEAR	Socorro	5.246	0.043	21.4	5.022	5.470	18 km	–	catalog · MPC · JPL
25937 Malysz	19 February 2001	LONEOS	Anderson Mesa	5.304	0.065	2.4	4.957	5.651	15 km	–	catalog · MPC · JPL
25938 Stoch	16 February 2001	LINEAR	Socorro	5.146	0.164	12.8	4.301	5.991	15 km	–	catalog · MPC · JPL
26057 Ankaios	30 September 1973	C. J. van Houten; I. van Houten-Groeneveld; T. Gehrels	Palomar	5.189	0.111	7.3	4.615	5.763	19 km	–	catalog · MPC · JPL
(26486) 2000 AQ_{231}	4 January 2000	LINEAR	Socorro	5.273	0.068	1.4	4.913	5.634	14 km	–	catalog · MPC · JPL
(26510) 2000 CZ_{34}	2 February 2000	LINEAR	Socorro	5.292	0.084	5.5	4.849	5.734	14 km	–	catalog · MPC · JPL
(26601) 2000 FD_{1}	26 March 2000	LINEAR	Socorro	5.273	0.093	23.4	4.784	5.761	25 km	–	catalog · MPC · JPL
(26705) 2001 FL_{145}	24 March 2001	LONEOS	Anderson Mesa	5.229	0.090	11.8	4.761	5.698	21 km	–	catalog · MPC · JPL
26763 Peirithoos	24 September 1960	C. J. van Houten; I. van Houten-Groeneveld; T. Gehrels	Palomar	5.344	0.069	1.2	4.976	5.712	12 km	–	catalog · MPC · JPL
28958 Binns	13 February 2001	LINEAR	Socorro	5.296	0.084	8.2	4.851	5.741	22 km	–	catalog · MPC · JPL
(28960) 2001 DZ_{81}	22 February 2001	Spacewatch	Kitt Peak	5.317	0.036	2.8	5.126	5.508	17 km	–	catalog · MPC · JPL
(30020) 2000 DZ_{5}	28 February 2000	LINEAR	Socorro	5.281	0.048	16.7	5.026	5.537	22 km	–	catalog · MPC · JPL
(30102) 2000 FC_{1}	26 March 2000	LINEAR	Socorro	5.260	0.042	23.7	5.039	5.480	36 km	–	catalog · MPC · JPL
(30510) 2001 DM_{44}	19 February 2001	LINEAR	Socorro	5.273	0.128	11.4	4.600	5.945	19 km	–	catalog · MPC · JPL
(31835) 2000 BK_{16}	30 January 2000	LINEAR	Socorro	5.131	0.053	15.1	4.861	5.402	27 km	–	catalog · MPC · JPL
(32498) 2000 XX_{37}	5 December 2000	LINEAR	Socorro	5.186	0.098	26.3	4.679	5.692	22 km	–	catalog · MPC · JPL
(33822) 2000 AA_{231}	4 January 2000	LONEOS	Anderson Mesa	5.195	0.164	17.4	4.344	6.045	23 km	–	catalog · MPC · JPL
(34684) 2001 CJ_{28}	2 February 2001	LONEOS	Anderson Mesa	5.208	0.126	21.2	4.550	5.866	23 km	–	catalog · MPC · JPL
34993 Euaimon	20 September 1973	C. J. van Houten; I. van Houten-Groeneveld; T. Gehrels	Palomar	5.144	0.057	8.9	4.852	5.436	19 km	–	catalog · MPC · JPL
(35272) 1996 RH_{10}	7 September 1996	Spacewatch	Kitt Peak	5.178	0.077	17.6	4.777	5.578	21 km	–	catalog · MPC · JPL
(35276) 1996 RS_{25}	13 September 1996	NEAT	Haleakala	5.157	0.076	13.0	4.764	5.549	25 km	–	catalog · MPC · JPL
(35277) 1996 RV_{27}	10 September 1996	Uppsala-DLR Trojan Survey	La Silla	5.238	0.035	20.0	5.057	5.419	23 km	–	catalog · MPC · JPL
(35363) 1997 TV_{28}	6 October 1997	Uppsala-DLR Trojan Survey	La Silla	5.190	0.079	16.0	4.778	5.601	19 km	–	catalog · MPC · JPL
(35672) 1998 UZ_{14}	23 October 1998	Spacewatch	Kitt Peak	5.148	0.037	4.0	4.956	5.340	18 km	–	catalog · MPC · JPL
(35673) 1998 VQ_{15}	10 November 1998	LINEAR	Socorro	5.090	0.044	9.9	4.867	5.314	35 km	–	catalog · MPC · JPL
(36259) 1999 XM_{74}	7 December 1999	LINEAR	Socorro	5.220	0.093	18.9	4.736	5.704	25 km	–	catalog · MPC · JPL
(36265) 1999 XV_{156}	8 December 1999	LINEAR	Socorro	5.174	0.024	6.1	5.050	5.299	22 km	–	catalog · MPC · JPL
(36267) 1999 XB_{211}	13 December 1999	LINEAR	Socorro	5.182	0.092	19.7	4.703	5.660	39 km	–	catalog · MPC · JPL
(36268) 1999 XT_{213}	14 December 1999	LINEAR	Socorro	5.138	0.042	11.0	4.921	5.356	20 km	–	catalog · MPC · JPL
(36269) 1999 XB_{214}	14 December 1999	LINEAR	Socorro	5.237	0.065	18.0	4.898	5.576	26 km	–	catalog · MPC · JPL
(36270) 1999 XS_{248}	6 December 1999	LINEAR	Socorro	5.187	0.066	8.9	4.844	5.530	23 km	–	catalog · MPC · JPL
(36271) 2000 AV_{19}	3 January 2000	LINEAR	Socorro	5.197	0.051	11.7	4.934	5.459	22 km	–	catalog · MPC · JPL
(36279) 2000 BQ_{5}	27 January 2000	LINEAR	Socorro	5.314	0.101	31.1	4.778	5.851	31 km	–	catalog · MPC · JPL
(37281) 2000 YA_{61}	30 December 2000	LINEAR	Socorro	5.079	0.063	5.8	4.758	5.399	16 km	–	catalog · MPC · JPL
(37297) 2001 BQ_{77}	26 January 2001	NEAT	Haleakala	5.250	0.077	20.8	4.847	5.652	27 km	–	catalog · MPC · JPL
(37298) 2001 BU_{80}	19 January 2001	LINEAR	Socorro	5.121	0.013	13.7	5.052	5.190	22 km	–	catalog · MPC · JPL
(37299) 2001 CN_{21}	1 February 2001	LONEOS	Anderson Mesa	5.162	0.103	29.7	4.630	5.693	25 km	–	catalog · MPC · JPL
(37300) 2001 CW_{32}	13 February 2001	LINEAR	Socorro	5.148	0.040	21.5	4.945	5.352	22 km	–	catalog · MPC · JPL
(37301) 2001 CA_{39}	13 February 2001	LINEAR	Socorro	5.181	0.053	20.3	4.908	5.454	27 km	–	catalog · MPC · JPL
(37685) 1995 OU_{2}	22 July 1995	Spacewatch	Kitt Peak	5.230	0.126	10.1	4.570	5.891	22 km	–	catalog · MPC · JPL
(37710) 1996 RD_{12}	8 September 1996	Spacewatch	Kitt Peak	5.228	0.081	9.6	4.805	5.652	18 km	–	catalog · MPC · JPL
(37714) 1996 RK_{29}	11 September 1996	Uppsala-DLR Trojan Survey	La Silla	5.153	0.188	4.5	4.186	6.120	14 km	–	catalog · MPC · JPL
(37715) 1996 RN_{31}	13 September 1996	Uppsala-DLR Trojan Survey	La Silla	5.161	0.025	8.9	5.034	5.288	19 km	–	catalog · MPC · JPL
(37716) 1996 RP_{32}	15 September 1996	Uppsala-DLR Trojan Survey	La Silla	5.174	0.067	4.3	4.825	5.523	15 km	–	catalog · MPC · JPL
(37732) 1996 TY_{68}	10 October 1996	C.-I. Lagerkvist	La Silla	5.240	0.025	15.5	5.107	5.374	21 km	–	catalog · MPC · JPL
(37789) 1997 UL_{16}	23 October 1997	Spacewatch	Kitt Peak	5.266	0.010	0.5	5.211	5.320	15 km	–	catalog · MPC · JPL
(37790) 1997 UX_{26}	27 October 1997	Uppsala-DLR Trojan Survey	La Silla	5.255	0.086	9.5	4.802	5.707	13 km	–	catalog · MPC · JPL
38050 Bias	10 November 1998	LINEAR	Socorro	5.198	0.078	28.5	4.794	5.602	62 km	–	catalog · MPC · JPL
(38051) 1998 XJ_{5}	7 December 1998	K. Korlević	Visnjan	5.170	0.187	8.7	4.205	6.134	22 km	–	catalog · MPC · JPL
(38052) 1998 XA_{7}	8 December 1998	Spacewatch	Kitt Peak	5.224	0.037	1.8	5.032	5.415	16 km	–	catalog · MPC · JPL
(38574) 1999 WS_{4}	28 November 1999	T. Kobayashi	Oizumi	5.142	0.106	7.2	4.597	5.687	17 km	–	catalog · MPC · JPL
(38585) 1999 XD_{67}	7 December 1999	LINEAR	Socorro	5.141	0.109	5.8	4.580	5.703	13 km	–	catalog · MPC · JPL
(38592) 1999 XH_{162}	13 December 1999	LINEAR	Socorro	5.252	0.088	15.8	4.792	5.713	24 km	–	catalog · MPC · JPL
(38594) 1999 XF_{193}	12 December 1999	LINEAR	Socorro	5.234	0.050	8.9	4.974	5.495	20 km	–	catalog · MPC · JPL
(38596) 1999 XP_{199}	12 December 1999	LINEAR	Socorro	5.140	0.063	6.5	4.814	5.466	13 km	–	catalog · MPC · JPL
(38597) 1999 XU_{200}	12 December 1999	LINEAR	Socorro	5.273	0.122	16.9	4.631	5.914	21 km	–	catalog · MPC · JPL
(38598) 1999 XQ_{208}	13 December 1999	LINEAR	Socorro	5.155	0.050	11.6	4.895	5.414	13 km	–	catalog · MPC · JPL
(38599) 1999 XC_{210}	13 December 1999	LINEAR	Socorro	5.213	0.090	14.5	4.746	5.680	23 km	–	catalog · MPC · JPL
(38600) 1999 XR_{213}	14 December 1999	LINEAR	Socorro	5.174	0.036	9.9	4.988	5.359	23 km	–	catalog · MPC · JPL
(38606) 1999 YC_{13}	31 December 1999	K. Korlević	Visnjan	5.151	0.062	18.3	4.831	5.470	24 km	–	catalog · MPC · JPL
(38607) 2000 AN_{6}	4 January 2000	P. G. Comba	Prescott	5.245	0.031	13.9	5.085	5.406	23 km	–	catalog · MPC · JPL
(38609) 2000 AB_{26}	3 January 2000	LINEAR	Socorro	5.277	0.111	11.6	4.689	5.865	20 km	–	catalog · MPC · JPL
(38610) 2000 AU_{45}	3 January 2000	LINEAR	Socorro	5.229	0.013	14.1	5.162	5.295	29 km	–	catalog · MPC · JPL
(38611) 2000 AS_{74}	5 January 2000	LINEAR	Socorro	5.191	0.129	8.4	4.523	5.858	19 km	–	catalog · MPC · JPL
(38614) 2000 AA_{113}	5 January 2000	LINEAR	Socorro	5.268	0.026	17.2	5.134	5.403	17 km	–	catalog · MPC · JPL
(38615) 2000 AV_{121}	5 January 2000	LINEAR	Socorro	5.171	0.162	4.0	4.331	6.011	21 km	–	catalog · MPC · JPL
(38617) 2000 AY_{161}	4 January 2000	LINEAR	Socorro	5.205	0.043	12.8	4.983	5.427	16 km	–	catalog · MPC · JPL
(38619) 2000 AW_{183}	7 January 2000	LINEAR	Socorro	5.175	0.157	14.1	4.363	5.987	21 km	–	catalog · MPC · JPL
(38621) 2000 AG_{201}	9 January 2000	LINEAR	Socorro	5.171	0.077	14.0	4.772	5.570	20 km	–	catalog · MPC · JPL
(39229) 2000 YJ_{30}	31 December 2000	NEAT	Haleakala	5.201	0.161	7.2	4.361	6.040	16 km	–	catalog · MPC · JPL
(39264) 2000 YQ_{139}	27 December 2000	LONEOS	Anderson Mesa	5.248	0.072	18.2	4.872	5.625	36 km	–	catalog · MPC · JPL
(39270) 2001 AH_{11}	2 January 2001	LINEAR	Socorro	5.182	0.075	5.4	4.792	5.573	20 km	–	catalog · MPC · JPL
(39275) 2001 AV_{37}	5 January 2001	LINEAR	Socorro	5.234	0.085	18.0	4.788	5.680	21 km	–	catalog · MPC · JPL
(39278) 2001 BK_{9}	19 January 2001	LINEAR	Socorro	5.259	0.081	6.0	4.831	5.686	20 km	–	catalog · MPC · JPL
(39280) 2001 BE_{24}	20 January 2001	LINEAR	Socorro	5.183	0.066	12.0	4.843	5.524	22 km	–	catalog · MPC · JPL
(39284) 2001 BB_{62}	26 January 2001	LINEAR	Socorro	5.195	0.049	9.0	4.941	5.450	17 km	–	catalog · MPC · JPL
39285 Kipkeino	26 January 2001	Spacewatch	Kitt Peak	5.172	0.081	6.5	4.755	5.590	18 km	–	catalog · MPC · JPL
(39286) 2001 CX_{6}	1 February 2001	LINEAR	Socorro	5.281	0.071	4.6	4.908	5.654	21 km	–	catalog · MPC · JPL
(39287) 2001 CD_{14}	1 February 2001	LINEAR	Socorro	5.104	0.042	5.2	4.889	5.319	13 km	–	catalog · MPC · JPL
(39288) 2001 CD_{21}	2 February 2001	LINEAR	Socorro	5.275	0.052	1.9	4.999	5.551	17 km	–	catalog · MPC · JPL
(39289) 2001 CT_{28}	2 February 2001	LONEOS	Anderson Mesa	5.253	0.045	10.0	5.015	5.491	13 km	–	catalog · MPC · JPL
(39292) 2001 DS_{4}	16 February 2001	LINEAR	Socorro	5.273	0.140	9.4	4.532	6.013	17 km	–	catalog · MPC · JPL
(39293) 2001 DQ_{10}	17 February 2001	LINEAR	Socorro	5.205	0.038	14.4	5.006	5.404	22 km	–	catalog · MPC · JPL
(39362) 2002 BU_{1}	21 January 2002	W. K. Y. Yeung	Desert Eagle	5.111	0.062	9.7	4.796	5.427	15 km	–	catalog · MPC · JPL
(39369) 2002 CE_{13}	8 February 2002	C. W. Juels	Fountain Hills	5.166	0.058	18.1	4.868	5.464	33 km	–	catalog · MPC · JPL
39463 Phyleus	19 September 1973	C. J. van Houten; I. van Houten-Groeneveld; T. Gehrels	Palomar	5.184	0.088	5.8	4.729	5.639	13 km	–	catalog · MPC · JPL
(39691) 1996 RR_{31}	13 September 1996	Uppsala-DLR Trojan Survey	La Silla	5.236	0.090	2.4	4.765	5.707	12 km	–	catalog · MPC · JPL
(39692) 1996 RB_{32}	14 September 1996	Uppsala-DLR Trojan Survey	La Silla	5.166	0.053	6.9	4.892	5.441	13 km	–	catalog · MPC · JPL
(39693) 1996 ST_{1}	17 September 1996	Spacewatch	Kitt Peak	5.207	0.011	6.5	5.152	5.263	15 km	–	catalog · MPC · JPL
(39793) 1997 SZ_{23}	29 September 1997	Spacewatch	Kitt Peak	5.199	0.065	15.0	4.859	5.539	12 km	–	catalog · MPC · JPL
(39794) 1997 SU_{24}	30 September 1997	Spacewatch	Kitt Peak	5.171	0.031	15.5	5.014	5.329	20 km	–	catalog · MPC · JPL
39795 Marson	30 September 1997	Spacewatch	Kitt Peak	5.165	0.097	6.7	4.663	5.666	18 km	–	catalog · MPC · JPL
(39797) 1997 TK_{18}	3 October 1997	Beijing Schmidt CCD Asteroid Program	Xinglong	5.172	0.082	15.0	4.749	5.594	19 km	–	catalog · MPC · JPL
(39798) 1997 TW_{28}	6 October 1997	Uppsala-DLR Trojan Survey	La Silla	5.182	0.105	8.0	4.640	5.725	12 km	–	catalog · MPC · JPL
(39803) 1997 UY_{15}	23 October 1997	Spacewatch	Kitt Peak	5.297	0.075	0.5	4.902	5.692	14 km	–	catalog · MPC · JPL
(40237) 1998 VM_{6}	11 November 1998	Y. Shimizu; T. Urata	Nachi-Katsuura	5.202	0.220	6.3	4.056	6.348	22 km	–	catalog · MPC · JPL
(40262) 1999 CF_{156}	7 February 1999	Spacewatch	Kitt Peak	5.248	0.153	10.8	4.447	6.049	14 km	–	catalog · MPC · JPL
(41268) 1999 XO_{64}	7 December 1999	LINEAR	Socorro	5.175	0.133	16.3	4.488	5.862	15 km	–	catalog · MPC · JPL
(41340) 1999 YO_{14}	31 December 1999	LINEAR	Socorro	5.162	0.058	33.2	4.863	5.462	35 km	–	catalog · MPC · JPL
(41342) 1999 YC_{23}	30 December 1999	LONEOS	Anderson Mesa	5.324	0.088	2.9	4.856	5.792	13 km	–	catalog · MPC · JPL
(41350) 2000 AJ_{25}	3 January 2000	LINEAR	Socorro	5.225	0.083	9.7	4.791	5.660	16 km	–	catalog · MPC · JPL
(41353) 2000 AB_{33}	3 January 2000	LINEAR	Socorro	5.222	0.078	10.0	4.813	5.631	17 km	–	catalog · MPC · JPL
(41355) 2000 AF_{36}	3 January 2000	LINEAR	Socorro	5.171	0.080	8.0	4.756	5.586	12 km	–	catalog · MPC · JPL
(41359) 2000 AG_{55}	4 January 2000	LINEAR	Socorro	5.153	0.026	6.8	5.017	5.288	16 km	–	catalog · MPC · JPL
(41379) 2000 AS_{105}	5 January 2000	LINEAR	Socorro	5.120	0.061	25.9	4.806	5.435	31 km	–	catalog · MPC · JPL
(41417) 2000 AL_{233}	4 January 2000	Spacewatch	Kitt Peak	5.193	0.043	1.7	4.970	5.416	13 km	–	catalog · MPC · JPL
(41426) 2000 CJ_{140}	5 February 2000	Spacewatch	Kitt Peak	5.316	0.070	1.5	4.945	5.688	12 km	–	catalog · MPC · JPL
(41427) 2000 DY_{4}	28 February 2000	LINEAR	Socorro	5.298	0.080	5.7	4.873	5.722	18 km	–	catalog · MPC · JPL
(42036) 2000 YP_{96}	30 December 2000	LINEAR	Socorro	5.202	0.038	6.5	5.002	5.401	23 km	–	catalog · MPC · JPL
(42114) 2001 BH_{4}	18 January 2001	LINEAR	Socorro	5.177	0.003	7.2	5.160	5.193	18 km	–	catalog · MPC · JPL
(42146) 2001 BN_{42}	19 January 2001	LINEAR	Socorro	5.158	0.033	11.4	4.988	5.329	22 km	–	catalog · MPC · JPL
(42168) 2001 CT_{13}	1 February 2001	LINEAR	Socorro	5.175	0.059	14.0	4.872	5.478	19 km	–	catalog · MPC · JPL
(42176) 2001 CK_{22}	1 February 2001	LONEOS	Anderson Mesa	5.216	0.092	14.3	4.737	5.696	19 km	–	catalog · MPC · JPL
(42179) 2001 CP_{25}	1 February 2001	LINEAR	Socorro	5.255	0.056	6.6	4.961	5.548	15 km	–	catalog · MPC · JPL
(42182) 2001 CP_{29}	2 February 2001	LONEOS	Anderson Mesa	5.186	0.032	6.6	5.018	5.353	18 km	–	catalog · MPC · JPL
(42187) 2001 CS_{32}	13 February 2001	LINEAR	Socorro	5.207	0.032	24.2	5.039	5.376	38 km	–	catalog · MPC · JPL
(42200) 2001 DJ_{26}	17 February 2001	LINEAR	Socorro	5.351	0.039	6.5	5.144	5.557	16 km	–	catalog · MPC · JPL
(42201) 2001 DH_{29}	17 February 2001	LINEAR	Socorro	5.173	0.160	7.1	4.346	5.999	18 km	–	catalog · MPC · JPL
(42230) 2001 DE_{108}	19 February 2001	LONEOS	Anderson Mesa	5.232	0.053	13.7	4.955	5.508	13 km	–	catalog · MPC · JPL
(42367) 2002 CQ_{134}	7 February 2002	LINEAR	Socorro	5.220	0.043	29.0	4.996	5.445	32 km	–	catalog · MPC · JPL
42403 Andraimon	24 September 1960	C. J. van Houten; I. van Houten-Groeneveld; T. Gehrels	Palomar	5.262	0.114	8.1	4.665	5.859	17 km	–	catalog · MPC · JPL
(42554) 1996 RJ_{28}	11 September 1996	Uppsala-DLR Trojan Survey	La Silla	5.127	0.029	17.5	4.979	5.275	27 km	–	catalog · MPC · JPL
(42555) 1996 RU_{31}	13 September 1996	Uppsala-DLR Trojan Survey	La Silla	5.242	0.113	6.4	4.649	5.835	18 km	–	catalog · MPC · JPL
43212 Katosawao	5 January 2000	LINEAR	Socorro	5.286	0.058	6.5	4.977	5.595	19 km	–	catalog · MPC · JPL
43436 Ansschut	30 December 2000	LINEAR	Socorro	5.152	0.004	8.4	5.134	5.170	21 km	–	catalog · MPC · JPL
(43627) 2002 CL_{224}	11 February 2002	LINEAR	Socorro	5.103	0.114	1.3	4.519	5.686	14 km	–	catalog · MPC · JPL
43706 Iphiklos	29 September 1973	C. J. van Houten; I. van Houten-Groeneveld; T. Gehrels	Palomar	5.174	0.089	13.5	4.715	5.633	15 km	–	catalog · MPC · JPL
(46676) 1996 RF_{29}	11 September 1996	Uppsala-DLR Trojan Survey	La Silla	5.158	0.115	11.5	4.563	5.752	18 km	–	catalog · MPC · JPL
(48269) 2002 AX_{166}	13 January 2002	LINEAR	Socorro	5.165	0.044	15.7	4.937	5.392	22 km	–	catalog · MPC · JPL
(51378) 2001 AT_{33}	4 January 2001	LINEAR	Socorro	5.146	0.052	33.7	4.880	5.413	23 km	–	catalog · MPC · JPL
(51405) 2001 DL_{106}	23 February 2001	Spacewatch	Kitt Peak	5.321	0.071	1.9	4.941	5.700	14 km	–	catalog · MPC · JPL
(52645) 1997 XR_{13}	2 December 1997	Uppsala-DLR Trojan Survey	La Silla	5.196	0.043	12.0	4.970	5.422	13 km	–	catalog · MPC · JPL
(53436) 1999 VB_{154}	13 November 1999	CSS	Catalina	5.058	0.012	18.3	4.998	5.118	28 km	–	catalog · MPC · JPL
(53449) 1999 XG_{132}	12 December 1999	LINEAR	Socorro	5.216	0.118	19.8	4.602	5.831	22 km	–	catalog · MPC · JPL
(53469) 2000 AX_{8}	2 January 2000	LINEAR	Socorro	5.120	0.065	7.4	4.789	5.451	18 km	–	catalog · MPC · JPL
(53477) 2000 AA_{54}	4 January 2000	LINEAR	Socorro	5.286	0.032	11.0	5.117	5.455	20 km	–	catalog · MPC · JPL
(54678) 2000 YW_{47}	30 December 2000	LINEAR	Socorro	5.143	0.081	11.2	4.726	5.560	19 km	–	catalog · MPC · JPL
(54680) 2001 AS_{9}	2 January 2001	LINEAR	Socorro	5.181	0.035	11.9	4.999	5.363	22 km	–	catalog · MPC · JPL
(54689) 2001 DH_{101}	16 February 2001	LINEAR	Socorro	5.204	0.116	12.9	4.599	5.809	20 km	–	catalog · MPC · JPL
(55563) 2002 AW_{34}	12 January 2002	NEAT	Haleakala	5.135	0.046	29.6	4.901	5.369	27 km	–	catalog · MPC · JPL
(55568) 2002 CU_{15}	8 February 2002	C. W. Juels; P. R. Holvorcem	Fountain Hills	5.127	0.035	25.7	4.948	5.306	28 km	–	catalog · MPC · JPL
(55571) 2002 CP_{82}	7 February 2002	LINEAR	Socorro	5.187	0.086	12.1	4.741	5.633	14 km	–	catalog · MPC · JPL
(55574) 2002 CF_{245}	13 February 2002	LINEAR	Socorro	5.215	0.077	7.7	4.812	5.618	19 km	–	catalog · MPC · JPL
(55578) 2002 GK_{105}	11 April 2002	LONEOS	Anderson Mesa	5.322	0.061	20.4	4.998	5.645	22 km	–	catalog · MPC · JPL
(56355) 2000 AX_{130}	6 January 2000	LINEAR	Socorro	5.286	0.038	2.5	5.084	5.488	18 km	–	catalog · MPC · JPL
(57041) 2001 EN_{12}	4 March 2001	LINEAR	Socorro	5.314	0.075	9.2	4.913	5.714	22 km	–	catalog · MPC · JPL
(57904) 2002 ER_{25}	10 March 2002	LONEOS	Anderson Mesa	5.249	0.072	2.0	4.872	5.626	22 km	–	catalog · MPC · JPL
(57910) 2002 ED_{61}	13 March 2002	LINEAR	Socorro	5.164	0.040	4.4	4.959	5.369	14 km	–	catalog · MPC · JPL
(57915) 2002 EB_{110}	9 March 2002	CSS	Catalina	5.238	0.038	14.9	5.040	5.436	18 km	–	catalog · MPC · JPL
(57920) 2002 EL_{153}	15 March 2002	Spacewatch	Kitt Peak	5.258	0.038	4.6	5.058	5.457	17 km	–	catalog · MPC · JPL
58096 Oineus	29 September 1973	C. J. van Houten; I. van Houten-Groeneveld; T. Gehrels	Palomar	5.219	0.116	3.6	4.615	5.823	13 km	–	catalog · MPC · JPL
(58366) 1995 OD_{8}	25 July 1995	Spacewatch	Kitt Peak	5.179	0.068	10.7	4.829	5.530	11 km	–	catalog · MPC · JPL
(58473) 1996 RN_{7}	5 September 1996	Spacewatch	Kitt Peak	5.219	0.046	5.1	4.980	5.458	14 km	–	catalog · MPC · JPL
(58475) 1996 RE_{11}	8 September 1996	Spacewatch	Kitt Peak	5.142	0.036	3.7	4.959	5.325	14 km	–	catalog · MPC · JPL
(58478) 1996 RC_{29}	11 September 1996	Uppsala-DLR Trojan Survey	La Silla	5.259	0.069	2.6	4.898	5.619	16 km	–	catalog · MPC · JPL
(58479) 1996 RJ_{29}	11 September 1996	Uppsala-DLR Trojan Survey	La Silla	5.220	0.036	8.4	5.033	5.406	15 km	–	catalog · MPC · JPL
(58480) 1996 RJ_{33}	15 September 1996	Uppsala-DLR Trojan Survey	La Silla	5.182	0.027	7.0	5.040	5.325	18 km	–	catalog · MPC · JPL
(59049) 1998 TC_{31}	10 October 1998	LONEOS	Anderson Mesa	5.148	0.123	24.2	4.515	5.782	25 km	–	catalog · MPC · JPL
(59355) 1999 CL_{153}	14 February 1999	Spacewatch	Kitt Peak	5.235	0.087	0.8	4.778	5.692	14 km	–	catalog · MPC · JPL
(60257) 1999 WB_{25}	28 November 1999	Spacewatch	Kitt Peak	5.074	0.034	2.3	4.902	5.246	14 km	–	catalog · MPC · JPL
(60313) 1999 XW_{218}	15 December 1999	Spacewatch	Kitt Peak	5.296	0.078	3.4	4.885	5.706	11 km	–	catalog · MPC · JPL
(60322) 1999 XB_{257}	7 December 1999	LINEAR	Socorro	5.152	0.024	10.3	5.028	5.275	21 km	–	catalog · MPC · JPL
(60328) 2000 AH_{7}	2 January 2000	LINEAR	Socorro	5.217	0.061	10.3	4.900	5.535	20 km	–	catalog · MPC · JPL
(60383) 2000 AR_{184}	7 January 2000	LINEAR	Socorro	5.279	0.073	15.1	4.897	5.662	35 km	–	catalog · MPC · JPL
(60388) 2000 AY_{217}	8 January 2000	Spacewatch	Kitt Peak	5.123	0.058	2.0	4.823	5.422	12 km	–	catalog · MPC · JPL
(60399) 2000 AY_{253}	7 January 2000	Spacewatch	Kitt Peak	5.245	0.128	4.3	4.575	5.915	17 km	–	catalog · MPC · JPL
(60401) 2000 BQ_{21}	29 January 2000	Spacewatch	Kitt Peak	5.264	0.042	8.6	5.044	5.483	18 km	–	catalog · MPC · JPL
(60421) 2000 CZ_{31}	2 February 2000	LINEAR	Socorro	5.272	0.033	6.7	5.100	5.444	14 km	–	catalog · MPC · JPL
(63175) 2000 YS_{55}	30 December 2000	LINEAR	Socorro	5.081	0.013	5.3	5.014	5.147	18 km	–	catalog · MPC · JPL
(63176) 2000 YN_{59}	30 December 2000	LINEAR	Socorro	5.073	0.014	2.8	5.003	5.144	12 km	–	catalog · MPC · JPL
(63193) 2000 YY_{118}	27 December 2000	LONEOS	Anderson Mesa	5.113	0.099	10.8	4.607	5.620	16 km	–	catalog · MPC · JPL
(63195) 2000 YN_{120}	19 December 2000	LINEAR	Socorro	5.211	0.046	18.9	4.970	5.452	25 km	–	catalog · MPC · JPL
(63202) 2000 YR_{131}	30 December 2000	LINEAR	Socorro	5.134	0.079	2.0	4.726	5.542	18 km	–	catalog · MPC · JPL
(63205) 2000 YG_{139}	27 December 2000	Spacewatch	Kitt Peak	5.091	0.049	4.3	4.843	5.338	17 km	–	catalog · MPC · JPL
(63210) 2001 AH_{13}	2 January 2001	LINEAR	Socorro	5.179	0.082	12.9	4.756	5.601	20 km	–	catalog · MPC · JPL
(63231) 2001 BA_{15}	21 January 2001	T. Kobayashi	Oizumi	5.356	0.059	6.7	5.042	5.670	19 km	–	catalog · MPC · JPL
(63234) 2001 BB_{20}	19 January 2001	LINEAR	Socorro	5.228	0.070	14.8	4.863	5.593	20 km	–	catalog · MPC · JPL
(63239) 2001 BD_{25}	20 January 2001	LINEAR	Socorro	5.205	0.067	6.2	4.855	5.554	19 km	–	catalog · MPC · JPL
(63241) 2001 BJ_{26}	20 January 2001	LINEAR	Socorro	5.255	0.048	25.8	5.002	5.508	23 km	–	catalog · MPC · JPL
(63257) 2001 BJ_{79}	21 January 2001	LINEAR	Socorro	5.205	0.064	12.8	4.874	5.536	14 km	–	catalog · MPC · JPL
(63259) 2001 BS_{81}	30 January 2001	W. Bickel	Bergisch Gladbach	5.171	0.033	2.2	5.000	5.342	13 km	–	catalog · MPC · JPL
(63265) 2001 CP_{12}	1 February 2001	LINEAR	Socorro	5.216	0.123	8.1	4.573	5.859	19 km	–	catalog · MPC · JPL
(63269) 2001 CE_{24}	1 February 2001	LONEOS	Anderson Mesa	5.142	0.079	7.4	4.735	5.548	18 km	–	catalog · MPC · JPL
(63272) 2001 CC_{49}	1 February 2001	LONEOS	Anderson Mesa	5.179	0.042	9.7	4.960	5.398	19 km	–	catalog · MPC · JPL
(63273) 2001 DH_{4}	16 February 2001	LINEAR	Socorro	5.216	0.126	9.4	4.559	5.873	30 km	–	catalog · MPC · JPL
(63278) 2001 DJ_{29}	17 February 2001	LINEAR	Socorro	5.225	0.128	12.6	4.555	5.895	15 km	–	catalog · MPC · JPL
(63279) 2001 DW_{34}	19 February 2001	LINEAR	Socorro	5.168	0.102	1.9	4.640	5.695	15 km	–	catalog · MPC · JPL
(63284) 2001 DM_{46}	19 February 2001	LINEAR	Socorro	5.259	0.159	3.4	4.425	6.093	12 km	–	catalog · MPC · JPL
(63286) 2001 DZ_{68}	19 February 2001	LINEAR	Socorro	5.302	0.104	6.4	4.751	5.853	16 km	–	catalog · MPC · JPL
(63287) 2001 DT_{79}	20 February 2001	NEAT	Haleakala	5.213	0.077	17.3	4.810	5.616	19 km	–	catalog · MPC · JPL
(63290) 2001 DS_{87}	21 February 2001	LONEOS	Anderson Mesa	5.290	0.063	6.5	4.955	5.625	19 km	–	catalog · MPC · JPL
(63291) 2001 DU_{87}	16 February 2001	LINEAR	Socorro	5.166	0.066	8.0	4.825	5.508	13 km	–	catalog · MPC · JPL
(63292) 2001 DQ_{89}	22 February 2001	LINEAR	Socorro	5.218	0.059	13.4	4.910	5.526	18 km	–	catalog · MPC · JPL
(63294) 2001 DQ_{90}	21 February 2001	Spacewatch	Kitt Peak	5.118	0.036	32.8	4.932	5.305	18 km	–	catalog · MPC · JPL
(65000) 2002 AV_{63}	11 January 2002	LINEAR	Socorro	5.146	0.013	20.3	5.077	5.216	24 km	–	catalog · MPC · JPL
(65097) 2002 CC_{4}	6 February 2002	LINEAR	Socorro	5.142	0.066	24.9	4.801	5.482	22 km	–	catalog · MPC · JPL
(65109) 2002 CV_{36}	7 February 2002	LINEAR	Socorro	5.129	0.032	12.7	4.968	5.291	22 km	–	catalog · MPC · JPL
(65111) 2002 CG_{40}	6 February 2002	NEAT	Haleakala	5.222	0.019	14.5	5.125	5.319	21 km	–	catalog · MPC · JPL
(65134) 2002 CH_{96}	7 February 2002	LINEAR	Socorro	5.206	0.088	1.8	4.746	5.665	15 km	–	catalog · MPC · JPL
(65150) 2002 CA_{126}	7 February 2002	LINEAR	Socorro	5.209	0.074	7.5	4.824	5.594	17 km	–	catalog · MPC · JPL
(65174) 2002 CW_{207}	10 February 2002	LINEAR	Socorro	5.186	0.055	3.5	4.902	5.469	13 km	–	catalog · MPC · JPL
(65179) 2002 CN_{224}	11 February 2002	LINEAR	Socorro	5.152	0.086	2.3	4.707	5.596	14 km	–	catalog · MPC · JPL
(65194) 2002 CV_{264}	8 February 2002	LINEAR	Socorro	5.140	0.014	17.1	5.066	5.214	19 km	–	catalog · MPC · JPL
(65205) 2002 DW_{12}	24 February 2002	NEAT	Palomar	5.215	0.133	8.1	4.523	5.906	18 km	–	catalog · MPC · JPL
(65206) 2002 DB_{13}	24 February 2002	NEAT	Palomar	5.139	0.083	4.9	4.712	5.565	12 km	–	catalog · MPC · JPL
(65209) 2002 DB_{17}	20 February 2002	LONEOS	Anderson Mesa	5.128	0.090	17.6	4.667	5.588	20 km	–	catalog · MPC · JPL
65210 Stichius	2 March 2002	E. W. Elst; H. Debehogne	Uccle	5.157	0.054	16.6	4.877	5.436	22 km	–	catalog · MPC · JPL
(65211) 2002 EK_{1}	6 March 2002	P. Kušnirák	Ondrejov	5.179	0.030	0.1	5.026	5.333	13 km	–	catalog · MPC · JPL
(65216) 2002 EZ_{13}	5 March 2002	NEAT	Palomar	5.054	0.064	7.1	4.732	5.375	18 km	–	catalog · MPC · JPL
(65217) 2002 EY_{16}	9 March 2002	LINEAR	Socorro	5.314	0.015	3.6	5.232	5.396	16 km	–	catalog · MPC · JPL
(65223) 2002 EU_{34}	11 March 2002	NEAT	Palomar	5.255	0.072	7.0	4.877	5.632	18 km	–	catalog · MPC · JPL
(65224) 2002 EJ_{44}	13 March 2002	LINEAR	Socorro	5.247	0.042	15.9	5.025	5.470	16 km	–	catalog · MPC · JPL
(65225) 2002 EK_{44}	13 March 2002	LINEAR	Socorro	5.287	0.082	7.0	4.854	5.720	17 km	–	catalog · MPC · JPL
(65227) 2002 ES_{46}	11 March 2002	NEAT	Haleakala	5.288	0.026	6.4	5.149	5.427	14 km	–	catalog · MPC · JPL
(65228) 2002 EH_{58}	13 March 2002	LINEAR	Socorro	5.088	0.070	16.7	4.730	5.445	19 km	–	catalog · MPC · JPL
(65229) 2002 EE_{61}	13 March 2002	LINEAR	Socorro	5.111	0.038	7.3	4.918	5.305	16 km	–	catalog · MPC · JPL
(65232) 2002 EO_{87}	9 March 2002	LINEAR	Socorro	5.270	0.040	5.9	5.062	5.479	13 km	–	catalog · MPC · JPL
(65240) 2002 EU_{106}	9 March 2002	LONEOS	Anderson Mesa	5.278	0.084	8.2	4.834	5.723	16 km	–	catalog · MPC · JPL
(65243) 2002 EP_{118}	10 March 2002	Spacewatch	Kitt Peak	5.291	0.068	1.7	4.928	5.653	13 km	–	catalog · MPC · JPL
(65245) 2002 EH_{130}	12 March 2002	LONEOS	Anderson Mesa	5.240	0.021	15.6	5.130	5.351	20 km	–	catalog · MPC · JPL
(65250) 2002 FT_{14}	16 March 2002	LINEAR	Socorro	5.213	0.150	4.0	4.434	5.992	12 km	–	catalog · MPC · JPL
(65257) 2002 FU_{36}	23 March 2002	LINEAR	Socorro	5.168	0.052	18.5	4.898	5.438	23 km	–	catalog · MPC · JPL
(65281) 2002 GM_{121}	10 April 2002	NEAT	Palomar	5.154	0.064	23.1	4.822	5.485	20 km	–	catalog · MPC · JPL
65583 Theoklymenos	30 September 1973	C. J. van Houten; I. van Houten-Groeneveld; T. Gehrels	Palomar	5.214	0.090	8.1	4.747	5.682	15 km	–	catalog · MPC · JPL
(65811) 1996 RW_{30}	13 September 1996	Uppsala-DLR Trojan Survey	La Silla	5.159	0.015	4.8	5.079	5.238	13 km	–	catalog · MPC · JPL
(67065) 1999 XW_{261}	3 December 1999	LINEAR	Socorro	5.065	0.027	31.7	4.929	5.200	22 km	–	catalog · MPC · JPL
(68112) 2000 YC_{143}	19 December 2000	Spacewatch	Kitt Peak	5.226	0.083	5.1	4.790	5.662	15 km	–	catalog · MPC · JPL
(68725) 2002 ED_{3}	10 March 2002	NEAT	Haleakala	5.198	0.106	13.1	4.646	5.751	18 km	–	catalog · MPC · JPL
(68766) 2002 EN_{102}	6 March 2002	NEAT	Palomar	5.218	0.034	11.3	5.040	5.396	18 km	–	catalog · MPC · JPL
(68788) 2002 FU_{13}	16 March 2002	NEAT	Haleakala	5.276	0.040	6.5	5.064	5.489	16 km	–	catalog · MPC · JPL
73637 Guneus	19 September 1973	C. J. van Houten; I. van Houten-Groeneveld; T. Gehrels	Palomar	5.157	0.185	12.0	4.202	6.113	16 km	–	catalog · MPC · JPL
(79444) 1997 UM_{26}	26 October 1997	Uppsala-DLR Trojan Survey	La Silla	5.192	0.031	12.0	5.029	5.356	17 km	–	catalog · MPC · JPL
(80251) 1999 WW_{11}	28 November 1999	Spacewatch	Kitt Peak	5.044	0.050	3.7	4.790	5.299	13 km	–	catalog · MPC · JPL
(80302) 1999 XC_{64}	7 December 1999	LINEAR	Socorro	5.147	0.026	17.3	5.014	5.279	20 km	–	catalog · MPC · JPL
(80638) 2000 AM_{217}	8 January 2000	Spacewatch	Kitt Peak	5.233	0.086	5.4	4.784	5.681	18 km	–	catalog · MPC · JPL
(83975) 2002 AD_{184}	6 January 2002	Spacewatch	Kitt Peak	5.177	0.038	10.9	4.981	5.372	17 km	–	catalog · MPC · JPL
(83977) 2002 CE_{89}	7 February 2002	LINEAR	Socorro	5.085	0.080	9.7	4.680	5.491	17 km	–	catalog · MPC · JPL
(83978) 2002 CC_{202}	10 February 2002	LINEAR	Socorro	5.165	0.079	4.4	4.757	5.572	18 km	–	catalog · MPC · JPL
(83979) 2002 EW_{5}	11 March 2002	NEAT	Palomar	5.195	0.075	8.5	4.807	5.584	20 km	–	catalog · MPC · JPL
(83980) 2002 EP_{9}	10 March 2002	NEAT	Palomar	5.192	0.101	9.6	4.666	5.718	16 km	–	catalog · MPC · JPL
(83981) 2002 EJ_{22}	10 March 2002	NEAT	Haleakala	5.291	0.026	7.0	5.151	5.430	17 km	–	catalog · MPC · JPL
(83983) 2002 GE_{39}	4 April 2002	NEAT	Palomar	5.192	0.128	55.4	4.529	5.854	22 km	–	catalog · MPC · JPL
(83984) 2002 GL_{77}	9 April 2002	LONEOS	Anderson Mesa	5.368	0.040	5.7	5.152	5.584	14 km	–	catalog · MPC · JPL
85030 Admetos	24 September 1960	C. J. van Houten; I. van Houten-Groeneveld; T. Gehrels	Palomar	5.222	0.085	22.8	4.779	5.664	21 km	–	catalog · MPC · JPL
(85394) 1996 RT_{32}	15 September 1996	Uppsala-DLR Trojan Survey	La Silla	5.171	0.053	5.6	4.897	5.446	14 km	–	catalog · MPC · JPL
(85498) 1997 TQ_{12}	2 October 1997	Spacewatch	Kitt Peak	5.261	0.062	3.8	4.937	5.586	12 km	–	catalog · MPC · JPL
(85798) 1998 VA_{50}	11 November 1998	LINEAR	Socorro	5.163	0.064	32.1	4.830	5.495	23 km	–	catalog · MPC · JPL
(85807) 1998 WR_{10}	21 November 1998	LINEAR	Socorro	5.184	0.089	26.5	4.724	5.645	22 km	–	catalog · MPC · JPL
(85822) 1998 XC_{17}	8 December 1998	ODAS	Caussols	5.180	0.128	11.3	4.516	5.844	12 km	–	catalog · MPC · JPL
(86377) 2000 AQ_{12}	3 January 2000	LINEAR	Socorro	5.099	0.063	11.5	4.779	5.420	19 km	–	catalog · MPC · JPL
(88225) 2001 BN_{27}	20 January 2001	LINEAR	Socorro	5.207	0.068	35.1	4.852	5.562	21 km	–	catalog · MPC · JPL
(88227) 2001 BU_{42}	19 January 2001	LINEAR	Socorro	5.175	0.065	9.8	4.838	5.513	19 km	–	catalog · MPC · JPL
(88229) 2001 BZ_{54}	19 January 2001	LINEAR	Socorro	5.204	0.012	8.8	5.144	5.265	18 km	–	catalog · MPC · JPL
(88240) 2001 CG_{21}	2 February 2001	G. Hug	Eskridge	5.259	0.038	11.5	5.062	5.457	13 km	–	catalog · MPC · JPL
(88241) 2001 CD_{23}	1 February 2001	LONEOS	Anderson Mesa	5.218	0.029	5.2	5.067	5.370	18 km	–	catalog · MPC · JPL
(88245) 2001 CH_{49}	2 February 2001	Asiago-DLR Asteroid Survey	Cima Ekar	5.267	0.117	8.8	4.653	5.881	11 km	–	catalog · MPC · JPL
(89829) 2002 BQ_{29}	20 January 2002	LONEOS	Anderson Mesa	5.222	0.052	14.3	4.953	5.491	17 km	–	catalog · MPC · JPL
(89836) 2002 CM_{15}	7 February 2002	LINEAR	Socorro	5.083	0.017	2.4	4.998	5.169	13 km	–	catalog · MPC · JPL
(89841) 2002 CM_{41}	7 February 2002	NEAT	Palomar	5.157	0.048	14.4	4.911	5.403	18 km	–	catalog · MPC · JPL
(89844) 2002 CP_{64}	6 February 2002	LINEAR	Socorro	5.186	0.089	19.0	4.724	5.649	16 km	–	catalog · MPC · JPL
(89852) 2002 CY_{82}	7 February 2002	LINEAR	Socorro	5.168	0.055	4.2	4.884	5.452	14 km	–	catalog · MPC · JPL
(89858) 2002 CK_{96}	7 February 2002	LINEAR	Socorro	5.207	0.045	10.6	4.975	5.439	19 km	–	catalog · MPC · JPL
(89871) 2002 CU_{143}	9 February 2002	LINEAR	Socorro	5.158	0.037	10.8	4.970	5.347	16 km	–	catalog · MPC · JPL
(89872) 2002 CZ_{144}	9 February 2002	LINEAR	Socorro	5.252	0.042	3.6	5.030	5.473	19 km	–	catalog · MPC · JPL
(89878) 2002 CL_{207}	10 February 2002	LINEAR	Socorro	5.122	0.050	1.7	4.867	5.377	13 km	–	catalog · MPC · JPL
(89886) 2002 CT_{230}	14 February 2002	Deep Lens Survey	Cerro Tololo	5.214	0.065	10.5	4.875	5.554	15 km	–	catalog · MPC · JPL
(89898) 2002 CY_{279}	7 February 2002	Spacewatch	Kitt Peak	5.119	0.032	0.5	4.954	5.284	12 km	–	catalog · MPC · JPL
(89913) 2002 EC_{24}	5 March 2002	Spacewatch	Kitt Peak	5.240	0.085	1.6	4.797	5.683	14 km	–	catalog · MPC · JPL
(89918) 2002 ER_{33}	11 March 2002	NEAT	Palomar	5.126	0.031	7.6	4.966	5.287	12 km	–	catalog · MPC · JPL
(89922) 2002 EV_{45}	11 March 2002	NEAT	Palomar	5.171	0.049	3.2	4.915	5.426	12 km	–	catalog · MPC · JPL
(89924) 2002 ED_{51}	12 March 2002	Spacewatch	Kitt Peak	5.262	0.029	1.2	5.107	5.416	19 km	–	catalog · MPC · JPL
(89927) 2002 EP_{61}	13 March 2002	LINEAR	Socorro	5.290	0.034	2.2	5.112	5.467	15 km	–	catalog · MPC · JPL
(89934) 2002 EH_{95}	14 March 2002	LINEAR	Socorro	5.208	0.079	7.8	4.797	5.619	18 km	–	catalog · MPC · JPL
(89935) 2002 EL_{138}	12 March 2002	NEAT	Palomar	5.246	0.067	3.2	4.896	5.595	17 km	–	catalog · MPC · JPL
(89938) 2002 FR_{4}	19 March 2002	NEAT	Palomar	5.194	0.076	32.0	4.800	5.588	18 km	–	catalog · MPC · JPL
(89940) 2002 FG_{8}	16 March 2002	LINEAR	Socorro	5.247	0.081	25.2	4.821	5.673	20 km	–	catalog · MPC · JPL
(90337) 2003 FQ_{97}	30 March 2003	LONEOS	Anderson Mesa	5.237	0.079	19.3	4.826	5.648	29 km	–	catalog · MPC · JPL
(90569) 2004 GY_{14}	14 April 2004	Needville	Needville	5.225	0.030	3.7	5.068	5.381	16 km	–	catalog · MPC · JPL
(95569) 2002 EC_{114}	10 March 2002	Spacewatch	Kitt Peak	5.298	0.054	2.2	5.012	5.583	14 km	–	catalog · MPC · JPL
(99464) 2002 CC_{91}	7 February 2002	LINEAR	Socorro	5.232	0.044	2.9	5.004	5.460	13 km	–	catalog · MPC · JPL
99950 Euchenor	19 September 1973	C. J. van Houten; I. van Houten-Groeneveld; T. Gehrels	Palomar	5.136	0.081	21.9	4.720	5.552	18 km	–	catalog · MPC · JPL

back to top
