= List of Jupiter trojans =

This is a list of Jupiter trojans by camp:

- List of Jupiter trojans (Greek camp)
  - List of Jupiter trojans (Greek camp) (1–100000)
  - List of Jupiter trojans (Greek camp) (100001–200000)
  - List of Jupiter trojans (Greek camp) (300001–400000)
  - List of Jupiter trojans (Greek camp) (400001–500000)
  - List of Jupiter trojans (Greek camp) (500001–600000)
  - List of Jupiter trojans (Greek camp) (600001–700000)
- List of Jupiter trojans (Trojan camp)
  - List of Jupiter trojans (Trojan camp) (1–100000)
  - List of Jupiter trojans (Trojan camp) (100001–200000)
  - List of Jupiter trojans (Trojan camp) (200001–300000)
  - List of Jupiter trojans (Trojan camp) (300001–400000)
  - List of Jupiter trojans (Trojan camp) (400001–500000)
  - List of Jupiter trojans (Trojan camp) (500001–600000)
  - List of Jupiter trojans (Trojan camp) (600001–700000)
