= 1869 Philoctetes =

Jupiter trojan asteroid

Discovery
- Discovered by: C. J. van Houten; I. van Houten-G. T. Gehrels
- Discovery site: Palomar Obs.
- Discovery date: 24 September 1960

Designations
- Pronunciation: /fɪləkˈtiːtiːz/
- Named after: Philoctetes (Greek mythology)
- Alternative designations: 4596 P-L
- Minor planet category: Jupiter trojan (Greek camp)

Orbital characteristics
- Epoch 4 September 2017 (JD 2458000.5)
- Uncertainty parameter 0
- Observation arc: 56.61 yr (20,677 days)
- Aphelion: 5.5755 AU
- Perihelion: 4.8600 AU
- Semi-major axis: 5.2178 AU
- Eccentricity: 0.0686
- Orbital period (sidereal): 11.92 yr (4,353 days)
- Mean anomaly: 247.19°
- Inclination: 3.9745°
- Longitude of ascending node: 43.984°
- Argument of perihelion: 321.66°
- Jupiter MOID: 0.0807 AU
- T_{Jupiter}: 2.9900

Physical characteristics
- Dimensions: 22.655±3.404 km
- Geometric albedo: 0.104±0.031
- Absolute magnitude (H): 11.2

1869 Philoctetes /fɪləkˈtiːtiːz/ is a Jupiter trojan from the Greek camp, approximately 23 kilometers in diameter.

It was discovered on September 24, 1960, by the Dutch and Dutch–American astronomers Cornelis van Houten, Ingrid van Houten-Groeneveld and Tom Gehrels at Palomar Observatory on Palomar Mountain, California. The asteroid was named after Philoctetes from Greek mythology. On the same night, the same group also discovered 1868 Thersites.

== Orbit and classification ==
Philoctetes orbits in the L_{4} Lagrangian point of the Sun–Jupiter system, in the "Greek Camp" of Trojan asteroids. It orbits the Sun at a distance of 4.9–5.6 AU once every 11 years and 11 months (4,353 days). Its orbit has an eccentricity of 0.07 and an inclination of 4° with respect to the ecliptic.

== Physical characteristics ==
According to the survey carried out by NASA's Wide-field Infrared Survey Explorer with its subsequent NEOWISE mission, Philoctetes measures 22.7 kilometers in diameter, and its surface has an albedo of 0.104.

As of 2017, the body's rotation period and shape remain unknown.

== Survey designation ==
The survey designation P-L stands for Palomar–Leiden, named after Palomar Observatory and Leiden Observatory, which collaborated on the fruitful Palomar–Leiden survey in the 1960s. Gehrels used Palomar's Samuel Oschin telescope (also known as the 48-inch Schmidt Telescope), and shipped the photographic plates to Cornelis Johannes van Houten and Ingrid van Houten-Groeneveld at Leiden Observatory. The trio are credited with several thousand asteroid discoveries.

== Naming ==
This minor planet was named after the Greek mythological figure Philoctetes, famed archer and participant in the Trojan War, where he killed Paris, son of the Trojan King Priam. The official naming citation was published by the Minor Planet Center on 1 June 1975 (M.P.C. 3826).
