= 10247 Amphiaraos =

Trojan asteroid

Discovery
- Discovered by: C. J. van Houten; I. van Houten-G. T. Gehrels
- Discovery site: Palomar Obs.
- Discovery date: 24 September 1960

Designations
- Pronunciation: /ˌæmfiəˈreɪəs, -ɒs/
- Named after: Amphiaraus (Greek mythology)
- Alternative designations: 6629 P-L · 1994 PT_{9}
- Minor planet category: Jupiter trojan Greek · background

Orbital characteristics
- Epoch 23 March 2018 (JD 2458200.5)
- Uncertainty parameter 0
- Observation arc: 57.01 yr (20,822 d)
- Aphelion: 5.3043 AU
- Perihelion: 5.2213 AU
- Semi-major axis: 5.2628 AU
- Eccentricity: 0.0079
- Orbital period (sidereal): 12.07 yr (4,410 d)
- Mean anomaly: 182.20°
- Mean motion: 0° 4^{m} 53.76^{s} / day
- Inclination: 4.1913°
- Longitude of ascending node: 162.52°
- Argument of perihelion: 343.92°
- Jupiter MOID: 0.2185 AU
- T_{Jupiter}: 2.9950

Physical characteristics
- Mean diameter: 26.83±0.69 km 33.54 km (calculated)
- Synodic rotation period: 34.26±0.01 h
- Geometric albedo: 0.057 (assumed); 0.098±0.015
- Spectral type: X/D (Pan-STARRS); X/D (SDSS-MOC); C (assumed)
- Absolute magnitude (H): 11.0; 11.1; 11.54±0.33

10247 Amphiaraos /ˌæmfiəˈreɪəs/ is a Jupiter trojan from the Greek camp, approximately 27 kilometers (17 miles) in diameter. It was discovered on 24 September 1960, by Dutch astronomers Ingrid and Cornelis van Houten at Leiden, and Tom Gehrels at the Palomar Observatory in California. The X/D-type asteroid has a long rotation period of 34.26 hours and possibly an elongated shape. It was named after the seer Amphiaraus (Amphiaraos) from Greek mythology.

== Orbit and classification ==
Amphiaraos is a Jovian asteroid orbiting in the leading Greek camp at Jupiter's L_{4} Lagrangian point, 60° ahead of the Gas Giant's orbit in a 1:1 resonance (see Trojans in astronomy). It is a non-family asteroid in the Jovian background population. It orbits the Sun at a distance of 5.2–5.3 AU once every 12 years and 1 month (4,410 days; semi-major axis of 5.26 AU). Its orbit has an eccentricity of 0.01 and an inclination of 4° with respect to the ecliptic. The body's observation arc begins with its official discovery observation at Palomar in September 1960.

=== Palomar–Leiden survey ===
The survey designation "P-L" stands for Palomar–Leiden, named after Palomar Observatory and Leiden Observatory, which collaborated on the fruitful Palomar–Leiden survey in the 1960s. Gehrels used Palomar's Samuel Oschin telescope (also known as the 48-inch Schmidt Telescope), and shipped the photographic plates to Ingrid and Cornelis van Houten at Leiden Observatory where astrometry was carried out. The trio are credited with the discovery of several thousand asteroid discoveries.

== Physical characteristics ==
Amphiaraos has been characterized as an X and D-type asteroid in the SDSS-based taxonomy, and by Pan-STARRS' survey. It is also an assumed C-type.

=== Rotation period ===
In March 2012, a rotational lightcurve of Amphiaraos was obtained from photometric observations by Robert Stephens, Daniel Coley and Ralph Megna at the Goat Mountain Astronomical Research Station (G79) in California. Lightcurve analysis gave a longer-than average rotation period of 34.26 hours with a brightness amplitude of 0.55 magnitude (U=2).

=== Diameter and albedo ===
According to the survey carried out by the NEOWISE mission of NASA's Wide-field Infrared Survey Explorer, Amphiaraos measures 26.83 kilometers in diameter and its surface has an albedo of 0.098, while the Collaborative Asteroid Lightcurve Link assumes a standard albedo for a carbonaceous asteroid of 0.057 and calculates a diameter of 33.54 kilometers based on an absolute magnitude of 11.1.

== Naming ==
This minor planet was named after the Greek seer Amphiaraus (Amphiaraos), who was the king of Argos. He was one of the Seven against Thebes. The official naming citation was published by the Minor Planet Center on 24 January 2000 (M.P.C. 38199).
