= Uppsala–DLR Trojan Survey =

Asteroid survey

Uppsala-DLR Trojan Survey
- Alternative names: UAO–DLR Trojan Survey

Minor planets discovered: 62
see § List of discovered minor planets

The Uppsala–DLR Trojan Survey (UDTS, also known as UAO–DLR Trojan Survey) is an astronomical survey to study the movements and locations of asteroids near Jupiter, which includes Jupiter trojans and other asteroids, which line-of sight are frequently blocked by the giant planet.

The survey was carried out at the Uppsala Astronomical Observatory in Sweden, in collaboration with the German Aerospace Center (DLR). Principal investigators were the astronomers Claes-Ingvar Lagerkvist, Gerhard Hahn, Stefano Mottola, Magnus Lundström and Uri Carsenty. The Uppsala–DLR Trojan Survey, UDTS, should not be confused with its successor, the Uppsala-DLR Asteroid Survey (UDAS), which started shortly after the UDTS concluded.

During the course of the survey, two telescopes were used at ESO's La Silla site in northern Chile. In fall of 1996, the ESO Schmidt telescope surveyed approximately 900 deg2 at Jupiter's L_{4} Lagrangian point, location of the so-called Greek camp. Additional positions and magnitudes of asteroids were obtained using the (now decommissioned) 0.61-meter Bochum telescope.

There is some notable controversy over P/1997 T3, one of the objects found in this survey, namely an asteroid-like object with a comet-like tail. It is thought that this tail is composed of dust, due to its consistent appearance, and the fact that it is pointing towards the Sun, not away from it.

The group of Jupiter trojan contains about 6,000 asteroid. They are named after figures from Greek mythology, typically after the heroes of the Trojan War as narrated in Homer's Iliad.

== List of discovered minor planets ==
The Minor Planet Center credits the Uppsala–DLR Trojan Survey with the discovery of 62 numbered minor planets during 1996–1997.

13181 Peneleos	11 September 1996	list
(13182) 1996 SO_{8}	16 September 1996	list
(14518) 1996 RZ_{30}	13 September 1996	list
15913 Telemachus	1 October 1997	list
(20144) 1996 RA_{33}	15 September 1996	list
(21271) 1996 RF_{33}	15 September 1996	list
(21370) 1997 TB_{28}	1 October 1997	list
(21371) 1997 TD_{28}	1 October 1997	list
(21372) 1997 TM_{28}	6 October 1997	list
(23622) 1996 RW_{29}	12 September 1996	list
(23709) 1997 TA_{28}	1 October 1997	list
(24882) 1996 RK_{30}	13 September 1996	list
(31170) 1997 WO_{58}	26 November 1997	list
(35277) 1996 RV_{27}	10 September 1996	list
(35363) 1997 TV_{28}	6 October 1997	list
(35373) 1997 UT_{25}	25 October 1997	list
(37714) 1996 RK_{29}	11 September 1996	list
(37715) 1996 RN_{31}	13 September 1996	list
(37716) 1996 RP_{32}	15 September 1996	list
(37790) 1997 UX_{26}	27 October 1997	list
(39691) 1996 RR_{31}	13 September 1996	list
(39692) 1996 RB_{32}	14 September 1996	list
(39798) 1997 TW_{28}	6 October 1997	list
(42554) 1996 RJ_{28}	11 September 1996	list
(42555) 1996 RU_{31}	13 September 1996	list

(46676) 1996 RF_{29}	11 September 1996	list
(52645) 1997 XR_{13}	2 December 1997	list
(58478) 1996 RC_{29}	11 September 1996	list
(58479) 1996 RJ_{29}	11 September 1996	list
(58480) 1996 RJ_{33}	15 September 1996	list
(58658) 1997 WY_{57}	27 November 1997	list
(58659) 1997 WZ_{57}	27 November 1997	list
(65811) 1996 RW_{30}	13 September 1996	list
(79444) 1997 UM_{26}	26 October 1997	list
(85394) 1996 RT_{32}	15 September 1996	list
(85548) 1997 XX_{13}	4 December 1997	list
(90866) 1996 RA_{28}	10 September 1996	list
(90988) 1997 XS_{13}	4 December 1997	list
(100452) 1996 RY_{27}	10 September 1996	list
(100624) 1997 TR_{28}	6 October 1997	list
(100636) 1997 UY_{26}	26 October 1997	list
(100671) 1997 WN_{57}	26 November 1997	list
(100672) 1997 WF_{58}	30 November 1997	list
(129594) 1997 UP_{25}	25 October 1997	list
(129606) 1997 WU_{57}	26 November 1997	list
(129607) 1997 WE_{58}	30 November 1997	list
(160527) 1996 RE_{31}	13 September 1996	list
(160528) 1996 RD_{32}	14 September 1996	list
(160540) 1997 WB_{58}	30 November 1997	list
(160541) 1997 WM_{58}	26 November 1997	list

(162046) 1996 RQ_{31}	13 September 1996	list
(162047) 1996 RJ_{32}	14 September 1996	list
(162048) 1996 RO_{32}	14 September 1996	list
(168362) 1996 RV_{28}	11 September 1996	list
(190317) 1997 XU_{13}	4 December 1997	list
(192388) 1996 RD_{29}	11 September 1996	list
(192389) 1996 RT_{29}	12 September 1996	list
(192390) 1996 RO_{30}	13 September 1996	list
(219057) 1996 RA_{30}	12 September 1996	list
(241582) 1996 RY_{30}	13 September 1996	list
(257505) 1996 RH_{33}	15 September 1996	list
(321570) 2009 SE_{361}	13 September 1996	list

== See also ==
- List of asteroid-discovering observatories
- List of minor planet discoverers § Discovering dedicated institutions
- Uppsala–ESO Survey of Asteroids and Comets, UESAC
