= Cornelis Johannes van Houten =

Dutch astronomer (1920–2002)

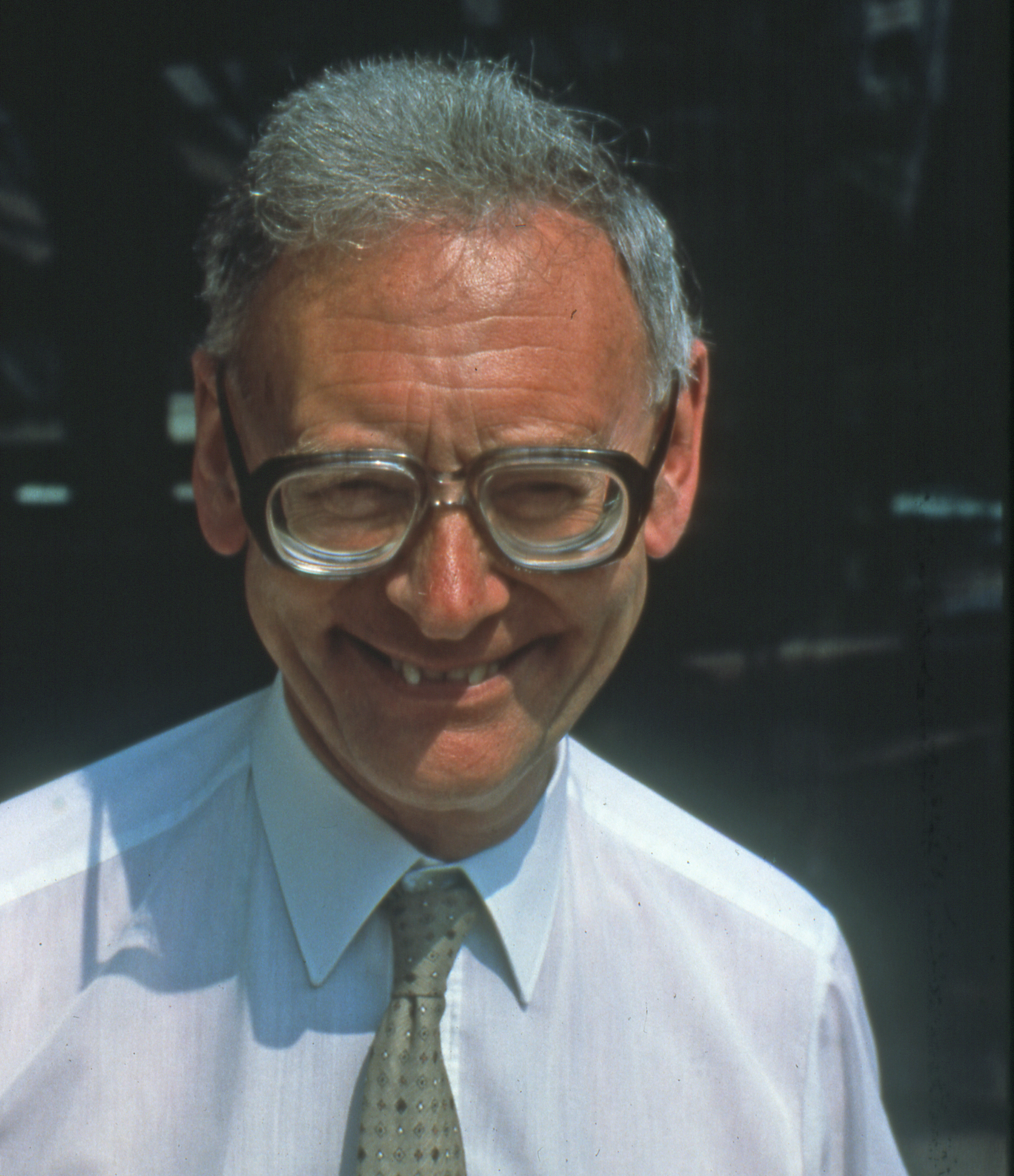
- C. J. van Houten in 1988
- Born: 18 February 1920; The Hague, Netherlands
- Died: 24 August 2002 (aged 82)
- Other names: Kees van Houten
- Spouse: Ingrid Groeneveld
- Children: Karel van Houten
- Scientific career
- Fields: Astronomy
- Institutions: Leiden Observatory; Leiden University; Palomar Observatory; Yerkes Observatory

Cornelis Johannes "Kees" van Houten (18 February 1920 – 24 August 2002) was a Dutch astronomer.

== Early life and education ==
Born in The Hague, he spent his entire career at Leiden University except for a brief period (1954–1956) as a research assistant at Yerkes Observatory.

== Family ==
He married fellow astronomer Ingrid Groeneveld (who became Ingrid van Houten-Groeneveld) and together they became interested in asteroids. They had one son, Karel.

== Work as astronomer ==
In a jointly credited trio with Tom Gehrels and Ingrid, he was an extremely prolific discoverer of many thousands of asteroids. Gehrels did a sky survey using the 48-inch Schmidt telescope at Palomar Observatory and shipped the plates to the van Houtens at Leiden Observatory, who analyzed them for new asteroids. The trio are jointly credited with several thousand discoveries. When the orbit of an asteroid is determined, it can be classified as an Apollo asteroid (e.g. 1862 Apollo), an Amor asteroid (e.g. 1221 Amor) or a Trojan asteroid (e.g. 55701 Ukalegon).

Statistics of asteroids were scarcely known until the 1950s when C. J. and I. van Houten made them their lives' dedication in the Yerkes-McDonald Survey and the Palomar-Leiden surveys . The van Houtens did not just do most of the work, but they also took care of bias problems in an exemplary manner."

He also studied the radial velocities of close binary stars. He never retired, but remained active and published articles until his death, on asteroids and eclipsing binaries. The main-belt asteroid 1673 van Houten was named in his honor.

== See also ==
- Ida Barney
- Palomar–Leiden survey
