= List of minor planets: 13001–14000 =

The following is a partial list of minor planets, running from minor-planet number 13001 through 14000, inclusive. The primary data for this and other partial lists is based on JPL's "Small-Body Orbital Elements" and data available from the Minor Planet Center. Critical list information is also provided by the MPC, unless otherwise specified from Lowell Observatory. A detailed description of the table's columns and additional sources are given on the main page including a complete list of every page in this series, and a statistical break-up on the dynamical classification of minor planets.

Also see the summary list of all named bodies in numerical and alphabetical order, and the corresponding naming citations for the number range of this particular list. New namings may only be added to this list after official publication, as the preannouncement of names is condemned by the Working Group for Small Bodies Nomenclature of the International Astronomical Union.

Near-Earth obj.	MBA (inner)	MBA (outer)	Centaur
Mars-crosser	MBA (middle)	Jupiter trojan	Trans-Neptunian obj.
Unclassified

== 13001–13100 ==
Designation			Discovery			Properties		Ref
Permanent	Provisional	Named after	Date	Site	Discoverer(s)	Category	Diam.	Ref
13001 Woodney	1981 VL	Woodney	November 2, 1981	Anderson Mesa	B. A. Skiff	·	4.5 km	MPC; JPL
13002 Vickihorner	1982 BJ_{13}	Vickihorner	January 30, 1982	Palomar	S. J. Bus	·	7.2 km	MPC; JPL
13003 Dickbeasley	1982 FN	Dickbeasley	March 21, 1982	Anderson Mesa	E. Bowell	·	8.2 km	MPC; JPL
13004 Aldaz	1982 RR	Aldaz	September 15, 1982	Anderson Mesa	E. Bowell	·	8.3 km	MPC; JPL
13005 Stankonyukhov	1982 SQ_{7}	Stankonyukhov	September 18, 1982	Nauchnij	N. S. Chernykh	·	7.9 km	MPC; JPL
13006 Schwaar	1983 AC_{1}	Schwaar	January 12, 1983	Anderson Mesa	B. A. Skiff	PHO	5.9 km	MPC; JPL
13007	1984 AU	—	January 8, 1984	Anderson Mesa	Wagner, J.	·	6.5 km	MPC; JPL
13008	1984 SE_{6}	—	September 22, 1984	La Silla	H. Debehogne	·	5.9 km	MPC; JPL
13009 Voloshchuk	1985 PB_{2}	Voloshchuk	August 13, 1985	Nauchnij	N. S. Chernykh	EUN	6.3 km	MPC; JPL
13010 Germantitov	1986 QR_{5}	Germantitov	August 29, 1986	Nauchnij	L. V. Zhuravleva	·	18 km	MPC; JPL
13011 Loeillet	1987 QS_{5}	Loeillet	August 26, 1987	La Silla	E. W. Elst	·	9.3 km	MPC; JPL
13012	1987 SO_{5}	—	September 30, 1987	Brorfelde	P. Jensen	·	9.1 km	MPC; JPL
13013	1987 SP_{12}	—	September 16, 1987	La Silla	H. Debehogne	·	10 km	MPC; JPL
13014 Hasslacher	1987 WJ_{1}	Hasslacher	November 17, 1987	Anderson Mesa	R. P. Binzel	(1298)	14 km	MPC; JPL
13015 Noradokei	1987 XC	Noradokei	December 14, 1987	Geisei	T. Seki	·	6.3 km	MPC; JPL
13016	1988 DB_{5}	—	February 25, 1988	Siding Spring	R. H. McNaught	EUN	3.4 km	MPC; JPL
13017 Owakenoomi	1988 FM	Owakenoomi	March 18, 1988	Yorii	M. Arai, H. Mori	EUN	5.3 km	MPC; JPL
13018 Geoffjames	1988 GF	Geoffjames	April 10, 1988	Palomar	E. F. Helin	EUN	8.0 km	MPC; JPL
13019	1988 NW	—	July 10, 1988	Palomar	E. F. Helin	EUN	6.8 km	MPC; JPL
13020	1988 PW_{2}	—	August 10, 1988	Siding Spring	R. H. McNaught	EOS	7.1 km	MPC; JPL
13021	1988 RY_{5}	—	September 3, 1988	La Silla	H. Debehogne	KOR	6.3 km	MPC; JPL
13022	1988 RL_{9}	—	September 1, 1988	La Silla	H. Debehogne	·	5.1 km	MPC; JPL
13023	1988 XT_{1}	—	December 10, 1988	Chiyoda	T. Kojima	·	16 km	MPC; JPL
13024 Conradferdinand	1989 AJ_{6}	Conradferdinand	January 11, 1989	Tautenburg Observatory	F. Börngen	V	3.2 km	MPC; JPL
13025 Zürich	1989 BA	Zürich	January 28, 1989	Zimmerwald	P. Wild	·	4.9 km	MPC; JPL
13026	1989 CX	—	February 7, 1989	Kushiro	S. Ueda, H. Kaneda	PHO	4.5 km	MPC; JPL
13027 Geeraerts	1989 GJ_{4}	Geeraerts	April 3, 1989	La Silla	E. W. Elst	(5)	5.0 km	MPC; JPL
13028 Klaustschira	1989 GQ_{6}	Klaustschira	April 5, 1989	La Silla	Geffert, M.	PHO	5.0 km	MPC; JPL
13029	1989 HA	—	April 27, 1989	Brorfelde	P. Jensen	·	14 km	MPC; JPL
13030	1989 PF	—	August 9, 1989	Palomar	J. Alu, E. F. Helin	·	7.3 km	MPC; JPL
13031 Durance	1989 SN_{4}	Durance	September 26, 1989	La Silla	E. W. Elst	·	6.5 km	MPC; JPL
13032 Tarn	1989 TU_{3}	Tarn	October 7, 1989	La Silla	E. W. Elst	·	4.5 km	MPC; JPL
13033 Gardon	1989 TB_{5}	Gardon	October 7, 1989	La Silla	E. W. Elst	fast	4.5 km	MPC; JPL
13034 Nobuowatanabe	1989 UN	Nobuowatanabe	October 23, 1989	Kani	Y. Mizuno, T. Furuta	·	3.5 km	MPC; JPL
13035	1989 UA_{6}	—	October 30, 1989	Cerro Tololo	S. J. Bus	3:2 · SHU	27 km	MPC; JPL
13036	1989 YO_{3}	—	December 30, 1989	Siding Spring	R. H. McNaught	·	4.3 km	MPC; JPL
13037 Potosi	1990 EN_{3}	Potosi	March 2, 1990	La Silla	E. W. Elst	·	3.2 km	MPC; JPL
13038 Woolston	1990 EN_{4}	Woolston	March 2, 1990	La Silla	E. W. Elst	TEL	5.4 km	MPC; JPL
13039 Awashima	1990 FK_{1}	Awashima	March 27, 1990	Kitami	K. Endate, K. Watanabe	·	20 km	MPC; JPL
13040	1990 OB_{4}	—	July 29, 1990	Palomar	H. E. Holt	·	5.6 km	MPC; JPL
13041	1990 OS_{4}	—	July 25, 1990	Palomar	H. E. Holt	MAR	6.1 km	MPC; JPL
13042	1990 QE	—	August 18, 1990	Palomar	E. F. Helin	(194)	7.4 km	MPC; JPL
13043	1990 QT_{4}	—	August 24, 1990	Palomar	H. E. Holt	MAR	5.3 km	MPC; JPL
13044 Wannes	1990 QO_{8}	Wannes	August 16, 1990	La Silla	E. W. Elst	EUN	5.3 km	MPC; JPL
13045 Vermandere	1990 QP_{8}	Vermandere	August 16, 1990	La Silla	E. W. Elst	·	3.8 km	MPC; JPL
13046 Aliev	1990 QB_{19}	Aliev	August 31, 1990	Nauchnij	L. V. Zhuravleva	·	3.2 km	MPC; JPL
13047	1990 RJ_{5}	—	September 15, 1990	Palomar	H. E. Holt	·	3.3 km	MPC; JPL
13048	1990 RR_{7}	—	September 13, 1990	La Silla	H. Debehogne	·	8.8 km	MPC; JPL
13049 Butov	1990 RF_{17}	Butov	September 15, 1990	Nauchnij	L. V. Zhuravleva	EUN	4.7 km	MPC; JPL
13050	1990 SY	—	September 16, 1990	Palomar	H. E. Holt	·	6.3 km	MPC; JPL
13051	1990 SF_{5}	—	September 22, 1990	La Silla	E. W. Elst	·	3.6 km	MPC; JPL
13052 Las Casas	1990 SN_{8}	Las Casas	September 22, 1990	La Silla	E. W. Elst	·	6.5 km	MPC; JPL
13053 Bertrandrussell	1990 SQ_{8}	Bertrandrussell	September 22, 1990	La Silla	E. W. Elst	·	3.9 km	MPC; JPL
13054	1990 ST_{15}	—	September 16, 1990	Palomar	H. E. Holt	V	4.2 km	MPC; JPL
13055 Kreppein	1990 TW_{12}	Kreppein	October 14, 1990	Tautenburg Observatory	L. D. Schmadel, F. Börngen	EUN	4.4 km	MPC; JPL
13056	1990 VN_{1}	—	November 12, 1990	Kushiro	S. Ueda, H. Kaneda	·	9.3 km	MPC; JPL
13057 Jorgensen	1990 VF_{8}	Jorgensen	November 13, 1990	Palomar	C. S. Shoemaker, D. H. Levy	·	8.4 km	MPC; JPL
13058 Alfredstevens	1990 WN_{3}	Alfredstevens	November 19, 1990	La Silla	E. W. Elst	V	2.6 km	MPC; JPL
13059 Ducuroir	1991 BD_{1}	Ducuroir	January 18, 1991	Haute-Provence	E. W. Elst	·	5.4 km	MPC; JPL
13060	1991 EJ	—	March 10, 1991	Siding Spring	R. H. McNaught	L4	36 km	MPC; JPL
13061	1991 FL_{2}	—	March 20, 1991	La Silla	H. Debehogne	·	6.6 km	MPC; JPL
13062 Podarkes	1991 HN	Podarkes	April 19, 1991	Palomar	C. S. Shoemaker, E. M. Shoemaker	L4 · slow	29 km	MPC; JPL
13063 Purifoy	1991 LB	Purifoy	June 5, 1991	Kitt Peak	Spacewatch	·	3.3 km	MPC; JPL
13064 Haemhouts	1991 PC_{6}	Haemhouts	August 6, 1991	La Silla	E. W. Elst	·	4.1 km	MPC; JPL
13065	1991 PG_{11}	—	August 9, 1991	Palomar	H. E. Holt	·	4.2 km	MPC; JPL
13066	1991 PM_{13}	—	August 5, 1991	Palomar	H. E. Holt	·	8.6 km	MPC; JPL
13067	1991 PA_{15}	—	August 6, 1991	Palomar	H. E. Holt	·	3.4 km	MPC; JPL
13068	1991 RL_{1}	—	September 4, 1991	Palomar	E. F. Helin	·	3.1 km	MPC; JPL
13069 Umbertoeco	1991 RX_{1}	Umbertoeco	September 6, 1991	Haute-Provence	E. W. Elst	·	5.2 km	MPC; JPL
13070 Seanconnery	1991 RO_{2}	Seanconnery	September 8, 1991	Haute Provence	E. W. Elst	·	1.8 km	MPC; JPL
13071	1991 RT_{5}	—	September 13, 1991	Palomar	H. E. Holt	V	3.7 km	MPC; JPL
13072	1991 RS_{8}	—	September 11, 1991	Palomar	H. E. Holt	·	5.0 km	MPC; JPL
13073	1991 RE_{15}	—	September 15, 1991	Palomar	H. E. Holt	·	3.8 km	MPC; JPL
13074	1991 RK_{15}	—	September 15, 1991	Palomar	H. E. Holt	·	3.6 km	MPC; JPL
13075	1991 UN_{1}	—	October 28, 1991	Kushiro	S. Ueda, H. Kaneda	V	2.9 km	MPC; JPL
13076	1991 VT_{3}	—	November 11, 1991	Kushiro	S. Ueda, H. Kaneda	EUN · fast	6.0 km	MPC; JPL
13077 Edschneider	1991 VD_{10}	Edschneider	November 4, 1991	Kitt Peak	Spacewatch	slow	4.5 km	MPC; JPL
13078	1991 WD	—	November 17, 1991	Kiyosato	S. Otomo	·	5.1 km	MPC; JPL
13079 Toots	1992 CD_{3}	Toots	February 2, 1992	La Silla	E. W. Elst	·	3.9 km	MPC; JPL
13080	1992 EZ_{7}	—	March 2, 1992	La Silla	UESAC	·	6.6 km	MPC; JPL
13081	1992 EW_{9}	—	March 2, 1992	La Silla	UESAC	MAR	8.9 km	MPC; JPL
13082 Gutiérrez	1992 EY_{10}	Gutiérrez	March 6, 1992	La Silla	UESAC	·	7.3 km	MPC; JPL
13083	1992 EE_{32}	—	March 2, 1992	La Silla	UESAC	(5)	3.4 km	MPC; JPL
13084 Virchow	1992 GC_{8}	Virchow	April 2, 1992	Tautenburg Observatory	F. Börngen	·	10 km	MPC; JPL
13085 Borlaug	1992 HA_{4}	Borlaug	April 23, 1992	La Silla	E. W. Elst	·	7.7 km	MPC; JPL
13086 Sauerbruch	1992 HS_{4}	Sauerbruch	April 30, 1992	Tautenburg Observatory	F. Börngen	DOR	11 km	MPC; JPL
13087 Chastellux	1992 OV_{6}	Chastellux	July 30, 1992	La Silla	E. W. Elst	KOR	6.2 km	MPC; JPL
13088 Filipportera	1992 PB_{1}	Filipportera	August 8, 1992	Caussols	E. W. Elst	·	10 km	MPC; JPL
13089	1992 PH_{2}	—	August 2, 1992	Palomar	H. E. Holt	EOS	9.0 km	MPC; JPL
13090	1992 PV_{2}	—	August 6, 1992	Palomar	H. E. Holt	EOS	8.1 km	MPC; JPL
13091	1992 PT_{3}	—	August 5, 1992	Palomar	H. E. Holt	·	2.2 km	MPC; JPL
13092 Schrödinger	1992 SS_{16}	Schrödinger	September 24, 1992	Tautenburg Observatory	F. Börngen, L. D. Schmadel	·	2.4 km	MPC; JPL
13093 Wolfgangpauli	1992 SQ_{24}	Wolfgangpauli	September 21, 1992	Tautenburg Observatory	F. Börngen	EOS	11 km	MPC; JPL
13094 Shinshuueda	1992 UK_{8}	Shinshuueda	October 19, 1992	Kitami	K. Endate, K. Watanabe	·	3.3 km	MPC; JPL
13095	1992 WY_{1}	—	November 18, 1992	Kushiro	S. Ueda, H. Kaneda	·	3.6 km	MPC; JPL
13096 Tigris	1993 BE_{5}	Tigris	January 27, 1993	Caussols	E. W. Elst	CYB	20 km	MPC; JPL
13097 Lamoraal	1993 BU_{7}	Lamoraal	January 23, 1993	La Silla	E. W. Elst	·	3.7 km	MPC; JPL
13098	1993 FM_{6}	—	March 17, 1993	La Silla	UESAC	·	4.8 km	MPC; JPL
13099	1993 FO_{7}	—	March 17, 1993	La Silla	UESAC	NYS	6.0 km	MPC; JPL
13100	1993 FB_{10}	—	March 17, 1993	La Silla	UESAC	NYS	5.1 km	MPC; JPL

== 13101–13200 ==
back to top

Designation			Discovery			Properties		Ref
Permanent	Provisional	Named after	Date	Site	Discoverer(s)	Category	Diam.	Ref
13101 Fransson	1993 FS_{10}	Fransson	March 19, 1993	La Silla	UESAC	·	3.5 km	MPC; JPL
13102	1993 FU_{11}	—	March 17, 1993	La Silla	UESAC	·	4.2 km	MPC; JPL
13103	1993 FR_{12}	—	March 17, 1993	La Silla	UESAC	NYS	3.1 km	MPC; JPL
13104	1993 FV_{24}	—	March 21, 1993	La Silla	UESAC	NYS	3.2 km	MPC; JPL
13105	1993 FO_{27}	—	March 21, 1993	La Silla	UESAC	·	3.0 km	MPC; JPL
13106	1993 FV_{48}	—	March 19, 1993	La Silla	UESAC	V	3.2 km	MPC; JPL
13107 Rudolfdvorak	1993 FE_{59}	Rudolfdvorak	March 19, 1993	La Silla	UESAC	·	5.1 km	MPC; JPL
13108	1993 FD_{82}	—	March 19, 1993	La Silla	UESAC	·	2.3 km	MPC; JPL
13109 Berzelius	1993 JB_{1}	Berzelius	May 14, 1993	La Silla	E. W. Elst	·	8.1 km	MPC; JPL
13110	1993 LS_{1}	—	June 15, 1993	Siding Spring	R. H. McNaught	EUN	4.8 km	MPC; JPL
13111 Papacosmas	1993 OW_{1}	Papacosmas	July 23, 1993	Palomar	C. S. Shoemaker, D. H. Levy	H	2.8 km	MPC; JPL
13112 Montmorency	1993 QV_{4}	Montmorency	August 18, 1993	Caussols	E. W. Elst	KOR	5.1 km	MPC; JPL
13113 Williamyeats	1993 RQ_{5}	Williamyeats	September 15, 1993	La Silla	E. W. Elst	·	8.7 km	MPC; JPL
13114 Isabelgodin	1993 SU_{4}	Isabelgodin	September 19, 1993	Caussols	E. W. Elst	·	4.9 km	MPC; JPL
13115 Jeangodin	1993 SU_{6}	Jeangodin	September 17, 1993	La Silla	E. W. Elst	·	6.1 km	MPC; JPL
13116 Hortensia	1993 TG_{26}	Hortensia	October 9, 1993	La Silla	E. W. Elst	EOS	8.4 km	MPC; JPL
13117 Pondicherry	1993 TW_{38}	Pondicherry	October 9, 1993	La Silla	E. W. Elst	EOS	7.2 km	MPC; JPL
13118 La Harpe	1993 UX_{4}	La Harpe	October 20, 1993	La Silla	E. W. Elst	EOS	9.0 km	MPC; JPL
13119	1993 VD_{4}	—	November 11, 1993	Kushiro	S. Ueda, H. Kaneda	·	11 km	MPC; JPL
13120	1993 VU_{7}	—	November 4, 1993	Siding Spring	R. H. McNaught	·	8.2 km	MPC; JPL
13121 Tisza	1994 CN_{9}	Tisza	February 7, 1994	La Silla	E. W. Elst	·	3.5 km	MPC; JPL
13122 Drava	1994 CV_{9}	Drava	February 7, 1994	La Silla	E. W. Elst	·	3.3 km	MPC; JPL
13123 Tyson	1994 KA	Tyson	May 16, 1994	Palomar	C. S. Shoemaker, D. H. Levy	PHO · moon	11 km	MPC; JPL
13124	1994 PS	—	August 14, 1994	Oizumi	T. Kobayashi	·	9.4 km	MPC; JPL
13125 Tobolsk	1994 PK_{5}	Tobolsk	August 10, 1994	La Silla	E. W. Elst	·	9.9 km	MPC; JPL
13126 Calbuco	1994 PT_{16}	Calbuco	August 10, 1994	La Silla	E. W. Elst	·	3.0 km	MPC; JPL
13127 Jeroenbrouwers	1994 PN_{25}	Jeroenbrouwers	August 12, 1994	La Silla	E. W. Elst	MAS	2.8 km	MPC; JPL
13128 Aleppo	1994 PS_{28}	Aleppo	August 12, 1994	La Silla	E. W. Elst	·	4.7 km	MPC; JPL
13129 Poseidonios	1994 PC_{29}	Poseidonios	August 12, 1994	La Silla	E. W. Elst	·	6.8 km	MPC; JPL
13130 Dylanthomas	1994 PW_{31}	Dylanthomas	August 12, 1994	La Silla	E. W. Elst	·	6.6 km	MPC; JPL
13131 Palmyra	1994 PL_{32}	Palmyra	August 12, 1994	La Silla	E. W. Elst	(5)	3.6 km	MPC; JPL
13132 Ortelius	1994 PO_{32}	Ortelius	August 12, 1994	La Silla	E. W. Elst	V	8.2 km	MPC; JPL
13133 Jandecleir	1994 PL_{34}	Jandecleir	August 10, 1994	La Silla	E. W. Elst	·	3.8 km	MPC; JPL
13134	1994 QR	—	August 16, 1994	Oizumi	T. Kobayashi	·	4.1 km	MPC; JPL
13135	1994 QX	—	August 31, 1994	Uenohara	N. Kawasato	MAR	5.0 km	MPC; JPL
13136	1994 UJ_{1}	—	October 25, 1994	Kushiro	S. Ueda, H. Kaneda	(5)	4.4 km	MPC; JPL
13137	1994 UT_{1}	—	October 26, 1994	Kushiro	S. Ueda, H. Kaneda	·	6.3 km	MPC; JPL
13138	1994 VA	—	November 1, 1994	Oizumi	T. Kobayashi	·	7.1 km	MPC; JPL
13139	1994 VD_{2}	—	November 3, 1994	Nachi-Katsuura	Y. Shimizu, T. Urata	·	9.3 km	MPC; JPL
13140 Shinchukai	1994 VW_{2}	Shinchukai	November 4, 1994	Kitami	K. Endate, K. Watanabe	·	5.7 km	MPC; JPL
13141	1994 WW_{2}	—	November 30, 1994	Oizumi	T. Kobayashi	·	8.6 km	MPC; JPL
13142	1994 YM_{2}	—	December 25, 1994	Kushiro	S. Ueda, H. Kaneda	·	4.8 km	MPC; JPL
13143	1995 AF	—	January 2, 1995	Oizumi	T. Kobayashi	EUN	8.8 km	MPC; JPL
13144	1995 BJ	—	January 23, 1995	Oizumi	T. Kobayashi	EOS · slow	7.8 km	MPC; JPL
13145 Cavezzo	1995 DZ_{1}	Cavezzo	February 27, 1995	Cavezzo	Cavezzo	·	8.1 km	MPC; JPL
13146 Yuriko	1995 DR_{2}	Yuriko	February 20, 1995	Nanyo	T. Okuni	·	10 km	MPC; JPL
13147 Foglia	1995 DZ_{11}	Foglia	February 24, 1995	Cima Ekar	M. Tombelli	KOR	6.5 km	MPC; JPL
13148	1995 EF	—	March 1, 1995	Ojima	T. Niijima, T. Urata	DOR	11 km	MPC; JPL
13149 Heisenberg	1995 EF_{8}	Heisenberg	March 4, 1995	Tautenburg Observatory	F. Börngen	THM	7.7 km	MPC; JPL
13150 Paolotesi	1995 FS	Paolotesi	March 23, 1995	San Marcello	L. Tesi, A. Boattini	TIR	10 km	MPC; JPL
13151 Polino	1995 OH	Polino	July 22, 1995	Osservatorio Polino	Iatteri, G.	·	3.4 km	MPC; JPL
13152	1995 QK	—	August 19, 1995	Church Stretton	S. P. Laurie	·	2.5 km	MPC; JPL
13153	1995 QC_{3}	—	August 31, 1995	Oizumi	T. Kobayashi	·	3.4 km	MPC; JPL
13154 Petermrva	1995 RC	Petermrva	September 7, 1995	Modra	A. Galád, Pravda, A.	·	4.2 km	MPC; JPL
13155	1995 SB_{1}	—	September 19, 1995	Catalina Station	T. B. Spahr	·	2.9 km	MPC; JPL
13156 Mannoucyo	1995 SP_{3}	Mannoucyo	September 20, 1995	Kitami	K. Endate, K. Watanabe	·	2.7 km	MPC; JPL
13157 Searfoss	1995 TQ_{6}	Searfoss	October 15, 1995	Kitt Peak	Spacewatch	·	3.3 km	MPC; JPL
13158 Carcano	1995 UE	Carcano	October 17, 1995	Sormano	P. Sicoli, Ghezzi, P.	·	3.0 km	MPC; JPL
13159	1995 UW_{3}	—	October 20, 1995	Oizumi	T. Kobayashi	NYS	3.7 km	MPC; JPL
13160	1995 US_{4}	—	October 25, 1995	Oizumi	T. Kobayashi	·	4.4 km	MPC; JPL
13161	1995 UK_{6}	—	October 27, 1995	Oizumi	T. Kobayashi	NYS	5.1 km	MPC; JPL
13162 Ryokkochigaku	1995 UK_{44}	Ryokkochigaku	October 22, 1995	Nyukasa	M. Hirasawa, S. Suzuki	V	3.5 km	MPC; JPL
13163 Koyamachuya	1995 UC_{45}	Koyamachuya	October 28, 1995	Kitami	K. Endate, K. Watanabe	·	5.7 km	MPC; JPL
13164	1995 VF	—	November 1, 1995	Oizumi	T. Kobayashi	V	2.9 km	MPC; JPL
13165	1995 WS_{1}	—	November 16, 1995	Kushiro	S. Ueda, H. Kaneda	·	4.3 km	MPC; JPL
13166	1995 WU_{1}	—	November 16, 1995	Kushiro	S. Ueda, H. Kaneda	·	7.1 km	MPC; JPL
13167	1995 WC_{5}	—	November 24, 1995	Oizumi	T. Kobayashi	·	6.0 km	MPC; JPL
13168 Danoconnell	1995 XW	Danoconnell	December 6, 1995	Haleakala	AMOS	MAR	4.8 km	MPC; JPL
13169	1995 XS_{1}	—	December 15, 1995	Oizumi	T. Kobayashi	NYS	4.8 km	MPC; JPL
13170	1995 YX	—	December 19, 1995	Oizumi	T. Kobayashi	NYS	4.5 km	MPC; JPL
13171	1996 AA	—	January 1, 1996	Oizumi	T. Kobayashi	V	3.0 km	MPC; JPL
13172	1996 AO	—	January 11, 1996	Oizumi	T. Kobayashi	·	4.9 km	MPC; JPL
13173	1996 AJ_{2}	—	January 13, 1996	Oizumi	T. Kobayashi	NYS	4.4 km	MPC; JPL
13174 Timossi	1996 CT_{8}	Timossi	February 14, 1996	Cima Ekar	M. Tombelli, U. Munari	MAR ·	6.5 km	MPC; JPL
13175	1996 EB_{2}	—	March 15, 1996	Haleakala	NEAT	GEF	4.1 km	MPC; JPL
13176 Kobedaitenken	1996 HE_{1}	Kobedaitenken	April 21, 1996	Yatsuka	R. H. McNaught, H. Abe	(5931)	20 km	MPC; JPL
13177 Hansschmidt	1996 HS_{11}	Hansschmidt	April 17, 1996	La Silla	E. W. Elst	KOR	5.3 km	MPC; JPL
13178 Catalan	1996 HF_{18}	Catalan	April 18, 1996	La Silla	E. W. Elst	·	8.4 km	MPC; JPL
13179 Johncochrane	1996 HU_{18}	Johncochrane	April 18, 1996	La Silla	E. W. Elst	THM	10 km	MPC; JPL
13180 Fourcroy	1996 HV_{19}	Fourcroy	April 18, 1996	La Silla	E. W. Elst	·	13 km	MPC; JPL
13181 Peneleos	1996 RS_{28}	Peneleos	September 11, 1996	La Silla	Uppsala-DLR Trojan Survey	L4	20 km	MPC; JPL
13182	1996 SO_{8}	—	September 16, 1996	La Silla	Uppsala-DLR Trojan Survey	L4	31 km	MPC; JPL
13183	1996 TW	—	October 5, 1996	Sudbury	D. di Cicco	L4	41 km	MPC; JPL
13184 Augeias	1996 TS_{49}	Augeias	October 4, 1996	La Silla	E. W. Elst	L4	34 km	MPC; JPL
13185 Agasthenes	1996 TH_{52}	Agasthenes	October 5, 1996	La Silla	E. W. Elst	L4	15 km	MPC; JPL
13186	1996 UM	—	October 18, 1996	Catalina Station	C. W. Hergenrother	H	2.6 km	MPC; JPL
13187	1997 AN_{4}	—	January 6, 1997	Oizumi	T. Kobayashi	·	3.7 km	MPC; JPL
13188 Okinawa	1997 AH_{5}	Okinawa	January 3, 1997	Chichibu	N. Satō	·	2.5 km	MPC; JPL
13189	1997 AF_{13}	—	January 11, 1997	Oizumi	T. Kobayashi	·	4.4 km	MPC; JPL
13190	1997 BN_{1}	—	January 29, 1997	Oizumi	T. Kobayashi	·	2.9 km	MPC; JPL
13191	1997 BP_{3}	—	January 31, 1997	Oizumi	T. Kobayashi	V	2.5 km	MPC; JPL
13192 Quine	1997 BU_{5}	Quine	January 31, 1997	Prescott	P. G. Comba	·	2.5 km	MPC; JPL
13193	1997 CW	—	February 1, 1997	Oizumi	T. Kobayashi	·	7.8 km	MPC; JPL
13194	1997 CA_{1}	—	February 1, 1997	Oizumi	T. Kobayashi	·	2.6 km	MPC; JPL
13195	1997 CG_{6}	—	February 2, 1997	Xinglong	SCAP	·	4.5 km	MPC; JPL
13196 Rogerssmith	1997 CE_{8}	Rogerssmith	February 1, 1997	Kitt Peak	Spacewatch	·	4.2 km	MPC; JPL
13197 Pontecorvo	1997 DC	Pontecorvo	February 17, 1997	Colleverde	V. S. Casulli	NYS	5.6 km	MPC; JPL
13198 Banpeiyu	1997 DT	Banpeiyu	February 27, 1997	Kitami	K. Endate, K. Watanabe	·	2.2 km	MPC; JPL
13199	1997 EW_{25}	—	March 3, 1997	Nanyo	T. Okuni	·	2.4 km	MPC; JPL
13200 Romagnani	1997 EQ_{40}	Romagnani	March 13, 1997	San Marcello	L. Tesi, G. Cattani	·	2.3 km	MPC; JPL

== 13201–13300 ==
back to top

Designation			Discovery			Properties		Ref
Permanent	Provisional	Named after	Date	Site	Discoverer(s)	Category	Diam.	Ref
13201	1997 EF_{41}	—	March 10, 1997	Socorro	LINEAR	·	3.0 km	MPC; JPL
13202	1997 FT_{3}	—	March 31, 1997	Socorro	LINEAR	·	2.1 km	MPC; JPL
13203	1997 FC_{5}	—	March 31, 1997	Socorro	LINEAR	·	5.8 km	MPC; JPL
13204	1997 GR_{12}	—	April 3, 1997	Socorro	LINEAR	NYS	4.3 km	MPC; JPL
13205	1997 GB_{19}	—	April 3, 1997	Socorro	LINEAR	·	3.4 km	MPC; JPL
13206 Baer	1997 GC_{22}	Baer	April 6, 1997	Socorro	LINEAR	·	3.4 km	MPC; JPL
13207 Tamagawa	1997 GZ_{25}	Tamagawa	April 10, 1997	Kuma Kogen	A. Nakamura	·	3.2 km	MPC; JPL
13208 Fraschetti	1997 GA_{38}	Fraschetti	April 5, 1997	Haleakala	NEAT	·	5.5 km	MPC; JPL
13209 Arnhem	1997 GQ_{41}	Arnhem	April 9, 1997	La Silla	E. W. Elst	·	3.9 km	MPC; JPL
13210	1997 HP_{8}	—	April 30, 1997	Socorro	LINEAR	·	4.5 km	MPC; JPL
13211 Stucky	1997 JH_{6}	Stucky	May 3, 1997	Kitt Peak	Spacewatch	·	4.9 km	MPC; JPL
13212 Jayleno	1997 JL_{13}	Jayleno	May 3, 1997	La Silla	E. W. Elst	·	5.2 km	MPC; JPL
13213 Maclaurin	1997 JB_{15}	Maclaurin	May 3, 1997	La Silla	E. W. Elst	·	3.1 km	MPC; JPL
13214 Chirikov	1997 JJ_{16}	Chirikov	May 3, 1997	La Silla	E. W. Elst	·	4.5 km	MPC; JPL
13215	1997 JT_{16}	—	May 3, 1997	Xinglong	SCAP	EOS	7.7 km	MPC; JPL
13216	1997 LH_{4}	—	June 9, 1997	Lake Clear	Williams, K. A.	MAR	4.5 km	MPC; JPL
13217 Alpbach	1997 ML_{2}	Alpbach	June 30, 1997	Caussols	ODAS	·	5.8 km	MPC; JPL
13218	1997 MC_{3}	—	June 28, 1997	Socorro	LINEAR	·	3.7 km	MPC; JPL
13219 Cailletet	1997 MB_{9}	Cailletet	June 30, 1997	Kitt Peak	Spacewatch	·	16 km	MPC; JPL
13220 Kashiwagura	1997 NG_{3}	Kashiwagura	July 1, 1997	Nanyo	T. Okuni	EOS	12 km	MPC; JPL
13221 Nao	1997 OY	Nao	July 24, 1997	Kuma Kogen	A. Nakamura	·	9.2 km	MPC; JPL
13222 Ichikawakazuo	1997 OV_{2}	Ichikawakazuo	July 27, 1997	Nanyo	T. Okuni	·	9.9 km	MPC; JPL
13223 Cenaceneri	1997 PQ_{4}	Cenaceneri	August 13, 1997	San Marcello	L. Tesi	·	2.1 km	MPC; JPL
13224 Takamatsuda	1997 PL_{5}	Takamatsuda	August 10, 1997	Nanyo	T. Okuni	·	19 km	MPC; JPL
13225 Manfredi	1997 QU_{1}	Manfredi	August 29, 1997	Bologna	San Vittore	KOR	5.1 km	MPC; JPL
13226 Soulié	1997 SH	Soulié	September 20, 1997	Ondřejov	L. Kotková	EOS	6.7 km	MPC; JPL
13227 Poor	1997 SR_{8}	Poor	September 27, 1997	Kitt Peak	Spacewatch	HYG	9.8 km	MPC; JPL
13228	1997 SJ_{25}	—	September 29, 1997	Nachi-Katsuura	Y. Shimizu, T. Urata	THM	13 km	MPC; JPL
13229 Echion	1997 VB_{1}	Echion	November 2, 1997	Kleť	J. Tichá, M. Tichý	L4	28 km	MPC; JPL
13230	1997 VG_{1}	—	November 1, 1997	Oohira	T. Urata	L4	24 km	MPC; JPL
13231 Blondelet	1998 BL_{14}	Blondelet	January 17, 1998	Caussols	ODAS	THM	8.0 km	MPC; JPL
13232 Prabhakar	1998 FM_{54}	Prabhakar	March 20, 1998	Socorro	LINEAR	·	3.1 km	MPC; JPL
13233	1998 FC_{66}	—	March 20, 1998	Socorro	LINEAR	·	9.9 km	MPC; JPL
13234 Natashaowen	1998 FC_{74}	Natashaowen	March 22, 1998	Anderson Mesa	LONEOS	·	4.1 km	MPC; JPL
13235 Isiguroyuki	1998 HT_{42}	Isiguroyuki	April 30, 1998	Nanyo	T. Okuni	·	4.3 km	MPC; JPL
13236	1998 HF_{96}	—	April 21, 1998	Socorro	LINEAR	·	4.3 km	MPC; JPL
13237	1998 HC_{98}	—	April 21, 1998	Socorro	LINEAR	·	4.5 km	MPC; JPL
13238 Lambeaux	1998 HU_{149}	Lambeaux	April 25, 1998	La Silla	E. W. Elst	·	5.3 km	MPC; JPL
13239 Kana	1998 KN	Kana	May 21, 1998	Kuma Kogen	A. Nakamura	·	2.6 km	MPC; JPL
13240 Thouvay	1998 KJ_{1}	Thouvay	May 18, 1998	Anderson Mesa	LONEOS	·	5.7 km	MPC; JPL
13241 Biyo	1998 KM_{41}	Biyo	May 22, 1998	Socorro	LINEAR	·	3.9 km	MPC; JPL
13242	1998 KR_{44}	—	May 22, 1998	Socorro	LINEAR	NYS	4.7 km	MPC; JPL
13243 Randhahn	1998 KZ_{47}	Randhahn	May 22, 1998	Socorro	LINEAR	V	3.4 km	MPC; JPL
13244 Dannymeyer	1998 MJ_{14}	Dannymeyer	June 26, 1998	Catalina	CSS	·	32 km	MPC; JPL
13245	1998 MM_{19}	—	June 23, 1998	Socorro	LINEAR	H	2.2 km	MPC; JPL
13246 Hannahshu	1998 MJ_{33}	Hannahshu	June 24, 1998	Socorro	LINEAR	LEO	8.9 km	MPC; JPL
13247 Tianshi	1998 MW_{34}	Tianshi	June 24, 1998	Socorro	LINEAR	·	3.9 km	MPC; JPL
13248 Fornasier	1998 MT_{37}	Fornasier	June 24, 1998	Anderson Mesa	LONEOS	·	7.0 km	MPC; JPL
13249 Marcallen	1998 MD_{38}	Marcallen	June 18, 1998	Anderson Mesa	LONEOS	·	21 km	MPC; JPL
13250 Danieladucato	1998 OJ	Danieladucato	July 19, 1998	San Marcello	A. Boattini, L. Tesi	·	2.4 km	MPC; JPL
13251 Viot	1998 OP	Viot	July 20, 1998	Caussols	ODAS	·	3.9 km	MPC; JPL
13252	1998 ON_{1}	—	July 18, 1998	Bergisch Gladbach	W. Bickel	DOR	9.1 km	MPC; JPL
13253 Stejneger	1998 OM_{13}	Stejneger	July 26, 1998	La Silla	E. W. Elst	·	2.4 km	MPC; JPL
13254 Kekulé	1998 OY_{13}	Kekulé	July 26, 1998	La Silla	E. W. Elst	·	2.8 km	MPC; JPL
13255	1998 OH_{14}	—	July 26, 1998	La Silla	E. W. Elst	·	4.4 km	MPC; JPL
13256 Marne	1998 OZ_{14}	Marne	July 26, 1998	La Silla	E. W. Elst	·	5.8 km	MPC; JPL
13257 Seanntorres	1998 QT_{8}	Seanntorres	August 17, 1998	Socorro	LINEAR	·	6.1 km	MPC; JPL
13258 Bej	1998 QT_{12}	Bej	August 17, 1998	Socorro	LINEAR	V	3.0 km	MPC; JPL
13259 Bhat	1998 QA_{15}	Bhat	August 17, 1998	Socorro	LINEAR	V	2.6 km	MPC; JPL
13260 Sabadell	1998 QZ_{15}	Sabadell	August 23, 1998	Montjoia	Casarramona, F., Vidal, A.	EUN	5.3 km	MPC; JPL
13261 Ganeshvenu	1998 QM_{16}	Ganeshvenu	August 17, 1998	Socorro	LINEAR	·	3.6 km	MPC; JPL
13262 Ruhiyusuf	1998 QF_{17}	Ruhiyusuf	August 17, 1998	Socorro	LINEAR	·	6.9 km	MPC; JPL
13263	1998 QV_{22}	—	August 17, 1998	Socorro	LINEAR	·	10 km	MPC; JPL
13264 Abdelhaq	1998 QD_{23}	Abdelhaq	August 17, 1998	Socorro	LINEAR	·	6.3 km	MPC; JPL
13265 Terbunkley	1998 QP_{23}	Terbunkley	August 17, 1998	Socorro	LINEAR	·	4.3 km	MPC; JPL
13266 Maiabland	1998 QY_{30}	Maiabland	August 17, 1998	Socorro	LINEAR	KOR	4.6 km	MPC; JPL
13267 Bolechowski	1998 QV_{32}	Bolechowski	August 17, 1998	Socorro	LINEAR	HYG	9.0 km	MPC; JPL
13268 Trevorcorbin	1998 QS_{34}	Trevorcorbin	August 17, 1998	Socorro	LINEAR	·	4.2 km	MPC; JPL
13269 Dahlstrom	1998 QV_{34}	Dahlstrom	August 17, 1998	Socorro	LINEAR	V	2.6 km	MPC; JPL
13270 Brittonbounds	1998 QX_{35}	Brittonbounds	August 17, 1998	Socorro	LINEAR	KOR	4.9 km	MPC; JPL
13271 Gingerbyrd	1998 QZ_{35}	Gingerbyrd	August 17, 1998	Socorro	LINEAR	·	4.5 km	MPC; JPL
13272 Ericadavid	1998 QH_{37}	Ericadavid	August 17, 1998	Socorro	LINEAR	·	3.5 km	MPC; JPL
13273 Cornwell	1998 QW_{37}	Cornwell	August 17, 1998	Socorro	LINEAR	·	2.9 km	MPC; JPL
13274 Roygross	1998 QX_{37}	Roygross	August 17, 1998	Socorro	LINEAR	·	3.8 km	MPC; JPL
13275 Kathgoetz	1998 QT_{39}	Kathgoetz	August 17, 1998	Socorro	LINEAR	RAF	5.0 km	MPC; JPL
13276	1998 QP_{40}	—	August 17, 1998	Socorro	LINEAR	EUN	6.0 km	MPC; JPL
13277	1998 QV_{40}	—	August 17, 1998	Socorro	LINEAR	slow	10 km	MPC; JPL
13278 Grotecloss	1998 QK_{42}	Grotecloss	August 17, 1998	Socorro	LINEAR	NYS	4.9 km	MPC; JPL
13279 Gutman	1998 QN_{43}	Gutman	August 17, 1998	Socorro	LINEAR	·	3.0 km	MPC; JPL
13280 Christihaas	1998 QM_{44}	Christihaas	August 17, 1998	Socorro	LINEAR	·	2.4 km	MPC; JPL
13281 Aliciahall	1998 QW_{45}	Aliciahall	August 17, 1998	Socorro	LINEAR	·	2.5 km	MPC; JPL
13282 Sharikahagan	1998 QQ_{49}	Sharikahagan	August 17, 1998	Socorro	LINEAR	·	4.8 km	MPC; JPL
13283 Dahart	1998 QF_{51}	Dahart	August 17, 1998	Socorro	LINEAR	MAS	3.5 km	MPC; JPL
13284	1998 QB_{52}	—	August 17, 1998	Socorro	LINEAR	EUN	6.4 km	MPC; JPL
13285 Stephicks	1998 QK_{52}	Stephicks	August 17, 1998	Socorro	LINEAR	·	5.0 km	MPC; JPL
13286 Adamchauvin	1998 QK_{53}	Adamchauvin	August 20, 1998	Anderson Mesa	LONEOS	V	4.4 km	MPC; JPL
13287	1998 QW_{53}	—	August 29, 1998	Višnjan Observatory	Višnjan	V	3.4 km	MPC; JPL
13288	1998 QV_{67}	—	August 24, 1998	Socorro	LINEAR	·	6.2 km	MPC; JPL
13289	1998 QK_{75}	—	August 24, 1998	Socorro	LINEAR	EOS	7.3 km	MPC; JPL
13290	1998 QN_{75}	—	August 24, 1998	Socorro	LINEAR	·	8.8 km	MPC; JPL
13291	1998 QH_{77}	—	August 24, 1998	Socorro	LINEAR	·	15 km	MPC; JPL
13292 Hernandezmon	1998 QT_{90}	Hernandezmon	August 28, 1998	Socorro	LINEAR	·	4.9 km	MPC; JPL
13293 Mechelen	1998 QO_{104}	Mechelen	August 26, 1998	La Silla	E. W. Elst	·	5.2 km	MPC; JPL
13294 Rockox	1998 QO_{105}	Rockox	August 25, 1998	La Silla	E. W. Elst	·	5.2 km	MPC; JPL
13295	1998 RE	—	September 2, 1998	Dynic	A. Sugie	·	18 km	MPC; JPL
13296	1998 RV	—	September 11, 1998	Woomera	F. B. Zoltowski	EOS ·	13 km	MPC; JPL
13297	1998 RX	—	September 12, 1998	Oizumi	T. Kobayashi	·	23 km	MPC; JPL
13298 Namatjira	1998 RD_{5}	Namatjira	September 15, 1998	Reedy Creek	J. Broughton	·	5.1 km	MPC; JPL
13299	1998 RU_{15}	—	September 4, 1998	Xinglong	SCAP	·	4.1 km	MPC; JPL
13300	1998 RF_{16}	—	September 14, 1998	Xinglong	SCAP	·	3.7 km	MPC; JPL

== 13301–13400 ==
back to top

Designation			Discovery			Properties		Ref
Permanent	Provisional	Named after	Date	Site	Discoverer(s)	Category	Diam.	Ref
13301 Hofsteen	1998 RP_{19}	Hofsteen	September 14, 1998	Socorro	LINEAR	·	3.8 km	MPC; JPL
13302 Kezmoh	1998 RO_{31}	Kezmoh	September 14, 1998	Socorro	LINEAR	·	2.9 km	MPC; JPL
13303 Asmitakumar	1998 RX_{32}	Asmitakumar	September 14, 1998	Socorro	LINEAR	·	3.7 km	MPC; JPL
13304	1998 RP_{47}	—	September 14, 1998	Socorro	LINEAR	EOS	8.4 km	MPC; JPL
13305 Danielang	1998 RD_{54}	Danielang	September 14, 1998	Socorro	LINEAR	·	4.1 km	MPC; JPL
13306	1998 RT_{58}	—	September 14, 1998	Socorro	LINEAR	KOR	7.1 km	MPC; JPL
13307 Taralarsen	1998 RE_{59}	Taralarsen	September 14, 1998	Socorro	LINEAR	·	9.9 km	MPC; JPL
13308 Melissamayne	1998 RL_{59}	Melissamayne	September 14, 1998	Socorro	LINEAR	AGN	3.9 km	MPC; JPL
13309	1998 RA_{60}	—	September 14, 1998	Socorro	LINEAR	EOS	7.3 km	MPC; JPL
13310 Nilvo	1998 RX_{63}	Nilvo	September 14, 1998	Socorro	LINEAR	·	8.8 km	MPC; JPL
13311	1998 RA_{68}	—	September 14, 1998	Socorro	LINEAR	·	8.2 km	MPC; JPL
13312 Orlowitz	1998 RK_{68}	Orlowitz	September 14, 1998	Socorro	LINEAR	·	5.3 km	MPC; JPL
13313 Kathypeng	1998 RU_{68}	Kathypeng	September 14, 1998	Socorro	LINEAR	HYG	8.5 km	MPC; JPL
13314	1998 RH_{71}	—	September 14, 1998	Socorro	LINEAR	(13314)	12 km	MPC; JPL
13315 Hilana	1998 RX_{71}	Hilana	September 14, 1998	Socorro	LINEAR	V	3.2 km	MPC; JPL
13316 Llano	1998 RJ_{75}	Llano	September 14, 1998	Socorro	LINEAR	·	2.9 km	MPC; JPL
13317	1998 RQ_{77}	—	September 14, 1998	Socorro	LINEAR	3:2	13 km	MPC; JPL
13318	1998 RV_{77}	—	September 14, 1998	Socorro	LINEAR	EOS	7.2 km	MPC; JPL
13319 Michaelmi	1998 RD_{79}	Michaelmi	September 14, 1998	Socorro	LINEAR	·	2.8 km	MPC; JPL
13320 Jessicamiles	1998 RL_{79}	Jessicamiles	September 14, 1998	Socorro	LINEAR	·	8.7 km	MPC; JPL
13321	1998 RC_{80}	—	September 14, 1998	Socorro	LINEAR	EOS	7.3 km	MPC; JPL
13322	1998 RH_{80}	—	September 14, 1998	Socorro	LINEAR	HYG	10 km	MPC; JPL
13323	1998 SQ	—	September 16, 1998	Caussols	ODAS	L4	23 km	MPC; JPL
13324	1998 SK_{2}	—	September 18, 1998	Zeno	T. Stafford	THM	10 km	MPC; JPL
13325 Valérienataf	1998 SV_{14}	Valérienataf	September 18, 1998	Anderson Mesa	LONEOS	·	3.9 km	MPC; JPL
13326 Ferri	1998 SH_{23}	Ferri	September 17, 1998	Anderson Mesa	LONEOS	·	11 km	MPC; JPL
13327 Reitsema	1998 SC_{24}	Reitsema	September 17, 1998	Anderson Mesa	LONEOS	·	7.6 km	MPC; JPL
13328 Guetter	1998 SP_{24}	Guetter	September 17, 1998	Anderson Mesa	LONEOS	·	7.0 km	MPC; JPL
13329 Davidhardy	1998 SB_{32}	Davidhardy	September 20, 1998	Kitt Peak	Spacewatch	·	11 km	MPC; JPL
13330 Dondavis	1998 SM_{46}	Dondavis	September 25, 1998	Kitt Peak	Spacewatch	THM	13 km	MPC; JPL
13331 Helos	1998 SU_{52}	Helos	September 30, 1998	Kitt Peak	Spacewatch	L4 · slow	18 km	MPC; JPL
13332 Benkhoff	1998 SM_{58}	Benkhoff	September 17, 1998	Anderson Mesa	LONEOS	KOR	4.7 km	MPC; JPL
13333 Carsenty	1998 SU_{59}	Carsenty	September 17, 1998	Anderson Mesa	LONEOS	V	2.5 km	MPC; JPL
13334 Tost	1998 SX_{60}	Tost	September 17, 1998	Anderson Mesa	LONEOS	EOS	5.3 km	MPC; JPL
13335 Tobiaswolf	1998 SK_{61}	Tobiaswolf	September 17, 1998	Anderson Mesa	LONEOS	·	5.7 km	MPC; JPL
13336 Jillpernell	1998 SN_{114}	Jillpernell	September 26, 1998	Socorro	LINEAR	·	5.2 km	MPC; JPL
13337 Sampath	1998 SZ_{114}	Sampath	September 26, 1998	Socorro	LINEAR	·	5.1 km	MPC; JPL
13338	1998 SK_{119}	—	September 26, 1998	Socorro	LINEAR	GEF	7.5 km	MPC; JPL
13339 Williamsmith	1998 SF_{123}	Williamsmith	September 26, 1998	Socorro	LINEAR	EOS	7.7 km	MPC; JPL
13340	1998 SM_{123}	—	September 26, 1998	Socorro	LINEAR	·	8.9 km	MPC; JPL
13341 Kellysweeney	1998 ST_{123}	Kellysweeney	September 26, 1998	Socorro	LINEAR	·	4.3 km	MPC; JPL
13342	1998 SF_{127}	—	September 26, 1998	Socorro	LINEAR	·	10 km	MPC; JPL
13343 Annietaylor	1998 SY_{127}	Annietaylor	September 26, 1998	Socorro	LINEAR	PAD	7.9 km	MPC; JPL
13344 Upenieks	1998 SD_{130}	Upenieks	September 26, 1998	Socorro	LINEAR	KOR	4.7 km	MPC; JPL
13345	1998 SW_{132}	—	September 26, 1998	Socorro	LINEAR	EOS	9.6 km	MPC; JPL
13346 Danielmiller	1998 SP_{133}	Danielmiller	September 26, 1998	Socorro	LINEAR	NYS	4.6 km	MPC; JPL
13347	1998 SF_{136}	—	September 26, 1998	Socorro	LINEAR	·	3.1 km	MPC; JPL
13348	1998 SF_{138}	—	September 26, 1998	Socorro	LINEAR	THM	12 km	MPC; JPL
13349 Yarotsky	1998 SD_{139}	Yarotsky	September 26, 1998	Socorro	LINEAR	PAD	7.3 km	MPC; JPL
13350 Gmelin	1998 ST_{144}	Gmelin	September 20, 1998	La Silla	E. W. Elst	·	10 km	MPC; JPL
13351 Zibeline	1998 SQ_{145}	Zibeline	September 20, 1998	La Silla	E. W. Elst	·	3.8 km	MPC; JPL
13352 Gyssens	1998 SZ_{163}	Gyssens	September 18, 1998	La Silla	E. W. Elst	EUN	6.6 km	MPC; JPL
13353	1998 TU_{12}	—	October 13, 1998	Kitt Peak	Spacewatch	L4	24 km	MPC; JPL
13354	1998 TO_{15}	—	October 15, 1998	Caussols	ODAS	EUN	5.1 km	MPC; JPL
13355	1998 TP_{17}	—	October 14, 1998	Promiod	Sala, G. A.	EOS	14 km	MPC; JPL
13356	1998 TX_{17}	—	October 14, 1998	Višnjan Observatory	K. Korlević	·	17 km	MPC; JPL
13357 Werkhoven	1998 TE_{29}	Werkhoven	October 15, 1998	Kitt Peak	Spacewatch	DOR	9.3 km	MPC; JPL
13358 Revelle	1998 TA_{34}	Revelle	October 14, 1998	Anderson Mesa	LONEOS	EUN	7.5 km	MPC; JPL
13359	1998 UC_{4}	—	October 20, 1998	Višnjan Observatory	K. Korlević	EUN	6.8 km	MPC; JPL
13360	1998 UD_{8}	—	October 23, 1998	Višnjan Observatory	K. Korlević	KOR	7.6 km	MPC; JPL
13361	1998 UM_{8}	—	October 24, 1998	Oizumi	T. Kobayashi	·	4.1 km	MPC; JPL
13362	1998 UQ_{16}	—	October 26, 1998	Višnjan Observatory	K. Korlević	L4	28 km	MPC; JPL
13363	1998 UR_{16}	—	October 26, 1998	Višnjan Observatory	K. Korlević	THM	12 km	MPC; JPL
13364	1998 UK_{20}	—	October 20, 1998	Kushiro	S. Ueda, H. Kaneda	·	11 km	MPC; JPL
13365 Tenzinyama	1998 UL_{20}	Tenzinyama	October 26, 1998	Nanyo	T. Okuni	EOS	9.4 km	MPC; JPL
13366	1998 US_{24}	—	October 18, 1998	Anderson Mesa	LONEOS	L4 · slow	33 km	MPC; JPL
13367 Jiří	1998 UT_{24}	Jiří	October 18, 1998	Anderson Mesa	LONEOS	·	15 km	MPC; JPL
13368 Wlodekofman	1998 UV_{24}	Wlodekofman	October 18, 1998	Anderson Mesa	LONEOS	KOR	4.4 km	MPC; JPL
13369 Youngblood	1998 UF_{37}	Youngblood	October 28, 1998	Socorro	LINEAR	THM	13 km	MPC; JPL
13370 Júliusbreza	1998 VF	Júliusbreza	November 7, 1998	Modra	L. Kornoš, P. Kolény	·	3.1 km	MPC; JPL
13371	1998 VH_{5}	—	November 8, 1998	Nachi-Katsuura	Y. Shimizu, T. Urata	V	3.9 km	MPC; JPL
13372	1998 VU_{6}	—	November 12, 1998	Oizumi	T. Kobayashi	L4	25 km	MPC; JPL
13373	1998 VL_{7}	—	November 10, 1998	Socorro	LINEAR	KOR	5.3 km	MPC; JPL
13374	1998 VT_{10}	—	November 10, 1998	Socorro	LINEAR	·	5.4 km	MPC; JPL
13375	1998 VH_{26}	—	November 10, 1998	Socorro	LINEAR	KOR	5.0 km	MPC; JPL
13376 Dunphy	1998 VO_{32}	Dunphy	November 15, 1998	Cocoa	I. P. Griffin	·	13 km	MPC; JPL
13377	1998 VN_{33}	—	November 15, 1998	Oizumi	T. Kobayashi	·	9.2 km	MPC; JPL
13378	1998 VF_{35}	—	November 12, 1998	Kushiro	S. Ueda, H. Kaneda	EOS · slow	14 km	MPC; JPL
13379	1998 WX_{9}	—	November 18, 1998	Socorro	LINEAR	L4	21 km	MPC; JPL
13380 Yamamohammed	1998 WQ_{11}	Yamamohammed	November 21, 1998	Socorro	LINEAR	·	3.7 km	MPC; JPL
13381	1998 WJ_{17}	—	November 21, 1998	Socorro	LINEAR	3:2	16 km	MPC; JPL
13382	1998 XC_{4}	—	December 11, 1998	Oizumi	T. Kobayashi	KOR	7.6 km	MPC; JPL
13383	1998 XS_{31}	—	December 14, 1998	Socorro	LINEAR	L4	24 km	MPC; JPL
13384	1998 XG_{79}	—	December 15, 1998	Socorro	LINEAR	slow	10 km	MPC; JPL
13385	1998 XO_{79}	—	December 15, 1998	Socorro	LINEAR	L4	36 km	MPC; JPL
13386	1998 XG_{80}	—	December 15, 1998	Socorro	LINEAR	·	13 km	MPC; JPL
13387 Irus	1998 YW_{6}	Irus	December 22, 1998	Farra d'Isonzo	Farra d'Isonzo	L4	19 km	MPC; JPL
13388	1999 AE_{6}	—	January 8, 1999	Socorro	LINEAR	MAR · slow	8.2 km	MPC; JPL
13389 Stacey	1999 AG_{24}	Stacey	January 10, 1999	Fair Oaks Ranch	J. V. McClusky	·	12 km	MPC; JPL
13390 Bouška	1999 FQ_{3}	Bouška	March 18, 1999	Ondřejov	P. Pravec, M. Wolf	EUN	7.5 km	MPC; JPL
13391	1999 JF_{37}	—	May 10, 1999	Socorro	LINEAR	EOS	12 km	MPC; JPL
13392	1999 KK_{15}	—	May 20, 1999	Socorro	LINEAR	EUN	4.1 km	MPC; JPL
13393	1999 ND_{9}	—	July 13, 1999	Socorro	LINEAR	·	4.6 km	MPC; JPL
13394	1999 RL_{31}	—	September 9, 1999	Višnjan Observatory	K. Korlević	·	3.8 km	MPC; JPL
13395 Deconihout	1999 RH_{35}	Deconihout	September 10, 1999	Saint-Michel-sur-Meurthe	L. Bernasconi	·	5.5 km	MPC; JPL
13396 Midavaine	1999 RU_{38}	Midavaine	September 11, 1999	Saint-Michel-sur-Meurthe	L. Bernasconi	·	4.9 km	MPC; JPL
13397	1999 RF_{47}	—	September 7, 1999	Socorro	LINEAR	NYS	4.2 km	MPC; JPL
13398	1999 RF_{62}	—	September 7, 1999	Socorro	LINEAR	·	5.0 km	MPC; JPL
13399	1999 RJ_{88}	—	September 7, 1999	Socorro	LINEAR	EOS	10 km	MPC; JPL
13400	1999 RC_{94}	—	September 7, 1999	Socorro	LINEAR	V	3.0 km	MPC; JPL

== 13401–13500 ==
back to top

Designation			Discovery			Properties		Ref
Permanent	Provisional	Named after	Date	Site	Discoverer(s)	Category	Diam.	Ref
13401	1999 RA_{133}	—	September 9, 1999	Socorro	LINEAR	·	10 km	MPC; JPL
13402	1999 RV_{165}	—	September 9, 1999	Socorro	LINEAR	L5	23 km	MPC; JPL
13403 Sarahmousa	1999 RJ_{167}	Sarahmousa	September 9, 1999	Socorro	LINEAR	·	4.3 km	MPC; JPL
13404 Norris	1999 RT_{177}	Norris	September 9, 1999	Socorro	LINEAR	·	3.3 km	MPC; JPL
13405 Dorisbillings	1999 ST_{1}	Dorisbillings	September 21, 1999	Calgary	Billings, G. W.	·	4.8 km	MPC; JPL
13406 Sekora	1999 TA_{4}	Sekora	October 2, 1999	Ondřejov	L. Kotková	·	8.8 km	MPC; JPL
13407 Ikukomakino	1999 TF_{4}	Ikukomakino	October 4, 1999	JCPM Sapporo	K. Watanabe	·	8.4 km	MPC; JPL
13408 Deadoklestic	1999 TF_{14}	Deadoklestic	October 10, 1999	Višnjan Observatory	M. Jurić, K. Korlević	NYS ·	6.9 km	MPC; JPL
13409	1999 US	—	October 16, 1999	Višnjan Observatory	K. Korlević	THM	10 km	MPC; JPL
13410 Arhale	1999 UX_{5}	Arhale	October 29, 1999	Catalina	CSS	·	2.7 km	MPC; JPL
13411 OLRAP	1999 UO_{7}	OLRAP	October 31, 1999	Bédoin	P. Antonini	EUN ·	5.4 km	MPC; JPL
13412 Guerrieri	1999 UJ_{8}	Guerrieri	October 29, 1999	Catalina	CSS	KOR	4.4 km	MPC; JPL
13413 Bobpeterson	1999 UF_{9}	Bobpeterson	October 29, 1999	Catalina	CSS	KOR	5.3 km	MPC; JPL
13414 Grantham	1999 UN_{25}	Grantham	October 29, 1999	Catalina	CSS	KOR	4.4 km	MPC; JPL
13415 Stevenbland	1999 UT_{25}	Stevenbland	October 29, 1999	Catalina	CSS	NYS	2.3 km	MPC; JPL
13416 Berryman	1999 UX_{25}	Berryman	October 30, 1999	Catalina	CSS	·	14 km	MPC; JPL
13417	1999 VH_{6}	—	November 5, 1999	Ōizumi	T. Kobayashi	·	10 km	MPC; JPL
13418	1999 VO_{9}	—	November 8, 1999	Višnjan Observatory	K. Korlević	MAS	3.8 km	MPC; JPL
13419	1999 VJ_{10}	—	November 9, 1999	Ōizumi	T. Kobayashi	THM	9.9 km	MPC; JPL
13420	1999 VN_{10}	—	November 9, 1999	Ōizumi	T. Kobayashi	·	11 km	MPC; JPL
13421 Holvorcem	1999 VO_{12}	Holvorcem	November 11, 1999	Fountain Hills	C. W. Juels	·	6.6 km	MPC; JPL
13422	1999 VM_{19}	—	November 10, 1999	Višnjan Observatory	K. Korlević	NYS	2.2 km	MPC; JPL
13423 Bobwoolley	1999 VR_{22}	Bobwoolley	November 13, 1999	Fountain Hills	C. W. Juels	PAD · slow	12 km	MPC; JPL
13424 Margalida	1999 VD_{24}	Margalida	November 8, 1999	Majorca	R. Pacheco, Á. López J.	·	4.4 km	MPC; JPL
13425 Waynebrown	1999 VG_{24}	Waynebrown	November 15, 1999	Fountain Hills	C. W. Juels	·	12 km	MPC; JPL
13426	1999 VA_{25}	—	November 13, 1999	Ōizumi	T. Kobayashi	·	6.0 km	MPC; JPL
13427	1999 VM_{25}	—	November 13, 1999	Ōizumi	T. Kobayashi	·	4.8 km	MPC; JPL
13428	1999 VC_{35}	—	November 3, 1999	Socorro	LINEAR	·	7.5 km	MPC; JPL
13429	1999 VM_{35}	—	November 3, 1999	Socorro	LINEAR	CYB	13 km	MPC; JPL
13430	1999 VM_{36}	—	November 3, 1999	Socorro	LINEAR	·	7.1 km	MPC; JPL
13431	1999 VB_{37}	—	November 3, 1999	Socorro	LINEAR	·	3.2 km	MPC; JPL
13432	1999 VW_{49}	—	November 3, 1999	Socorro	LINEAR	KOR	4.7 km	MPC; JPL
13433 Phelps	1999 VP_{52}	Phelps	November 3, 1999	Socorro	LINEAR	·	5.0 km	MPC; JPL
13434 Adamquade	1999 VK_{58}	Adamquade	November 4, 1999	Socorro	LINEAR	NYS	3.9 km	MPC; JPL
13435 Rohret	1999 VX_{67}	Rohret	November 4, 1999	Socorro	LINEAR	·	2.6 km	MPC; JPL
13436 Enid	1999 WF	Enid	November 17, 1999	Zeno	T. Stafford	THM	16 km	MPC; JPL
13437 Wellton-Persson	1999 WF_{8}	Wellton-Persson	November 28, 1999	Kvistaberg	Uppsala-DLR Asteroid Survey	·	3.6 km	MPC; JPL
13438 Marthanalexander	1999 XD_{86}	Marthanalexander	December 7, 1999	Socorro	LINEAR	·	2.6 km	MPC; JPL
13439 Frankiethomas	2072 P-L	Frankiethomas	September 24, 1960	Palomar	C. J. van Houten, I. van Houten-Groeneveld, T. Gehrels	·	2.0 km	MPC; JPL
13440	2095 P-L	—	September 24, 1960	Palomar	C. J. van Houten, I. van Houten-Groeneveld, T. Gehrels	·	3.2 km	MPC; JPL
13441 Janmerlin	2098 P-L	Janmerlin	September 24, 1960	Palomar	C. J. van Houten, I. van Houten-Groeneveld, T. Gehrels	·	6.4 km	MPC; JPL
13442	2646 P-L	—	September 24, 1960	Palomar	C. J. van Houten, I. van Houten-Groeneveld, T. Gehrels	·	4.3 km	MPC; JPL
13443	2785 P-L	—	September 26, 1960	Palomar	C. J. van Houten, I. van Houten-Groeneveld, T. Gehrels	·	3.6 km	MPC; JPL
13444	3040 P-L	—	September 24, 1960	Palomar	C. J. van Houten, I. van Houten-Groeneveld, T. Gehrels	·	6.2 km	MPC; JPL
13445	3063 P-L	—	September 24, 1960	Palomar	C. J. van Houten, I. van Houten-Groeneveld, T. Gehrels	CYB	20 km	MPC; JPL
13446 Almarkim	3087 P-L	Almarkim	September 24, 1960	Palomar	C. J. van Houten, I. van Houten-Groeneveld, T. Gehrels	EOS	11 km	MPC; JPL
13447	4115 P-L	—	September 24, 1960	Palomar	C. J. van Houten, I. van Houten-Groeneveld, T. Gehrels	·	3.7 km	MPC; JPL
13448 Edbryce	4526 P-L	Edbryce	September 24, 1960	Palomar	C. J. van Houten, I. van Houten-Groeneveld, T. Gehrels	NYS	4.7 km	MPC; JPL
13449 Margaretgarland	4845 P-L	Margaretgarland	September 24, 1960	Palomar	C. J. van Houten, I. van Houten-Groeneveld, T. Gehrels	·	7.7 km	MPC; JPL
13450	6077 P-L	—	September 24, 1960	Palomar	C. J. van Houten, I. van Houten-Groeneveld, T. Gehrels	·	8.1 km	MPC; JPL
13451	6103 P-L	—	September 24, 1960	Palomar	C. J. van Houten, I. van Houten-Groeneveld, T. Gehrels	·	5.5 km	MPC; JPL
13452	6513 P-L	—	September 24, 1960	Palomar	C. J. van Houten, I. van Houten-Groeneveld, T. Gehrels	EUN	4.6 km	MPC; JPL
13453	6538 P-L	—	September 24, 1960	Palomar	C. J. van Houten, I. van Houten-Groeneveld, T. Gehrels	·	12 km	MPC; JPL
13454	6594 P-L	—	September 24, 1960	Palomar	C. J. van Houten, I. van Houten-Groeneveld, T. Gehrels	·	4.2 km	MPC; JPL
13455	6626 P-L	—	September 24, 1960	Palomar	C. J. van Houten, I. van Houten-Groeneveld, T. Gehrels	·	4.2 km	MPC; JPL
13456	6640 P-L	—	September 26, 1960	Palomar	C. J. van Houten, I. van Houten-Groeneveld, T. Gehrels	HYG	8.4 km	MPC; JPL
13457	6761 P-L	—	September 24, 1960	Palomar	C. J. van Houten, I. van Houten-Groeneveld, T. Gehrels	EOS	6.7 km	MPC; JPL
13458	4214 T-1	—	March 26, 1971	Palomar	C. J. van Houten, I. van Houten-Groeneveld, T. Gehrels	(5)	3.6 km	MPC; JPL
13459	4235 T-1	—	March 26, 1971	Palomar	C. J. van Houten, I. van Houten-Groeneveld, T. Gehrels	slow	2.2 km	MPC; JPL
13460	1083 T-2	—	September 29, 1973	Palomar	C. J. van Houten, I. van Houten-Groeneveld, T. Gehrels	·	4.5 km	MPC; JPL
13461	1607 T-2	—	September 24, 1973	Palomar	C. J. van Houten, I. van Houten-Groeneveld, T. Gehrels	·	4.4 km	MPC; JPL
13462	2076 T-2	—	September 29, 1973	Palomar	C. J. van Houten, I. van Houten-Groeneveld, T. Gehrels	·	2.5 km	MPC; JPL
13463 Antiphos	5159 T-2	Antiphos	September 25, 1973	Palomar	C. J. van Houten, I. van Houten-Groeneveld, T. Gehrels	L4	25 km	MPC; JPL
13464	1036 T-3	—	October 17, 1977	Palomar	C. J. van Houten, I. van Houten-Groeneveld, T. Gehrels	·	14 km	MPC; JPL
13465	1194 T-3	—	October 17, 1977	Palomar	C. J. van Houten, I. van Houten-Groeneveld, T. Gehrels	V	3.0 km	MPC; JPL
13466	2349 T-3	—	October 16, 1977	Palomar	C. J. van Houten, I. van Houten-Groeneveld, T. Gehrels	EOS	7.2 km	MPC; JPL
13467	2676 T-3	—	October 11, 1977	Palomar	C. J. van Houten, I. van Houten-Groeneveld, T. Gehrels	·	3.7 km	MPC; JPL
13468	3378 T-3	—	October 16, 1977	Palomar	C. J. van Houten, I. van Houten-Groeneveld, T. Gehrels	slow	2.4 km	MPC; JPL
13469	3424 T-3	—	October 16, 1977	Palomar	C. J. van Houten, I. van Houten-Groeneveld, T. Gehrels	·	2.8 km	MPC; JPL
13470	3517 T-3	—	October 16, 1977	Palomar	C. J. van Houten, I. van Houten-Groeneveld, T. Gehrels	·	5.6 km	MPC; JPL
13471	4046 T-3	—	October 16, 1977	Palomar	C. J. van Houten, I. van Houten-Groeneveld, T. Gehrels	·	3.3 km	MPC; JPL
13472	4064 T-3	—	October 16, 1977	Palomar	C. J. van Houten, I. van Houten-Groeneveld, T. Gehrels	EOS	6.9 km	MPC; JPL
13473 Hokema	1953 GJ	Hokema	April 7, 1953	Heidelberg	K. Reinmuth	·	2.5 km	MPC; JPL
13474 Vʹyus	1973 QO_{1}	Vʹyus	August 29, 1973	Nauchnij	T. M. Smirnova	·	6.9 km	MPC; JPL
13475 Orestes	1973 SX	Orestes	September 19, 1973	Palomar	C. J. van Houten, I. van Houten-Groeneveld, T. Gehrels	L4	22 km	MPC; JPL
13476 Pepesales	1974 QF	Pepesales	August 16, 1974	El Leoncito	Félix Aguilar Observatory	·	2.5 km	MPC; JPL
13477 Utkin	1975 VW_{5}	Utkin	November 5, 1975	Nauchnij	L. I. Chernykh	·	7.0 km	MPC; JPL
13478 Fraunhofer	1976 DB_{1}	Fraunhofer	February 27, 1976	Tautenburg Observatory	F. Börngen	H	1.9 km	MPC; JPL
13479 Vet	1977 TO_{6}	Vet	October 8, 1977	Nauchnij	L. I. Chernykh	·	3.0 km	MPC; JPL
13480 Potapov	1978 PX_{3}	Potapov	August 9, 1978	Nauchnij	N. S. Chernykh, L. I. Chernykh	·	2.7 km	MPC; JPL
13481 Aubele	1978 VM_{11}	Aubele	November 6, 1978	Palomar	E. F. Helin, S. J. Bus	(5)	3.7 km	MPC; JPL
13482 Igorfedorov	1979 HN_{5}	Igorfedorov	April 25, 1979	Nauchnij	N. S. Chernykh	·	11 km	MPC; JPL
13483	1980 SF	—	September 16, 1980	Kleť	Z. Vávrová	NYS	4.1 km	MPC; JPL
13484 Jinnylin	1981 EA_{16}	Jinnylin	March 1, 1981	Siding Spring	S. J. Bus	·	2.4 km	MPC; JPL
13485	1981 QJ_{3}	—	August 25, 1981	La Silla	H. Debehogne	THM	11 km	MPC; JPL
13486 Morgangibson	1981 UT_{29}	Morgangibson	October 24, 1981	Palomar	S. J. Bus	EOS	11 km	MPC; JPL
13487 Novosyadlyj	1981 VN	Novosyadlyj	November 2, 1981	Anderson Mesa	B. A. Skiff	MAR	8.9 km	MPC; JPL
13488 Savanov	1982 TK_{1}	Savanov	October 14, 1982	Nauchnij	L. G. Karachkina	EOS	14 km	MPC; JPL
13489 Dmitrienko	1982 UO_{6}	Dmitrienko	October 20, 1982	Nauchnij	L. G. Karachkina	EOS	8.0 km	MPC; JPL
13490 Allanchapman	1984 BZ_{6}	Allanchapman	January 26, 1984	Palomar	E. Bowell	·	5.8 km	MPC; JPL
13491	1984 UJ_{1}	—	October 28, 1984	Kleť	A. Mrkos	·	4.3 km	MPC; JPL
13492 Vitalijzakharov	1984 YE_{4}	Vitalijzakharov	December 27, 1984	Nauchnij	L. G. Karachkina	·	2.5 km	MPC; JPL
13493 Lockwood	1985 PT	Lockwood	August 14, 1985	Anderson Mesa	E. Bowell	ADE	11 km	MPC; JPL
13494 Treiso	1985 RT	Treiso	September 14, 1985	Anderson Mesa	E. Bowell	·	3.1 km	MPC; JPL
13495	1985 RD_{3}	—	September 6, 1985	La Silla	H. Debehogne	·	2.6 km	MPC; JPL
13496	1985 RF_{3}	—	September 6, 1985	La Silla	H. Debehogne	·	3.3 km	MPC; JPL
13497 Ronstone	1986 EK_{1}	Ronstone	March 5, 1986	Anderson Mesa	E. Bowell	PHO	4.8 km	MPC; JPL
13498 Al Chwarizmi	1986 PX	Al Chwarizmi	August 6, 1986	Smolyan	E. W. Elst, V. G. Ivanova	·	3.1 km	MPC; JPL
13499 Steinberg	1986 TQ_{5}	Steinberg	October 1, 1986	Caussols	CERGA	THM	9.4 km	MPC; JPL
13500 Viscardy	1987 PM	Viscardy	August 6, 1987	Caussols	CERGA	·	10 km	MPC; JPL

== 13501–13600 ==
back to top

Designation			Discovery			Properties		Ref
Permanent	Provisional	Named after	Date	Site	Discoverer(s)	Category	Diam.	Ref
13501	1987 VR	—	November 15, 1987	Kleť	A. Mrkos	EOS	9.3 km	MPC; JPL
13502	1987 WD	—	November 17, 1987	Kushiro	S. Ueda, H. Kaneda	·	7.9 km	MPC; JPL
13503	1988 RH_{6}	—	September 6, 1988	La Silla	H. Debehogne	·	4.1 km	MPC; JPL
13504	1988 RV_{12}	—	September 14, 1988	Cerro Tololo	S. J. Bus	T_{j} (2.96) · 3:2	30 km	MPC; JPL
13505	1989 AB_{3}	—	January 4, 1989	Siding Spring	R. H. McNaught	EOS · slow	7.7 km	MPC; JPL
13506	1989 AF_{3}	—	January 4, 1989	Siding Spring	R. H. McNaught	·	3.8 km	MPC; JPL
13507	1989 AN_{5}	—	January 4, 1989	Siding Spring	R. H. McNaught	·	5.8 km	MPC; JPL
13508	1989 DC	—	February 27, 1989	Dynic	A. Sugie	·	4.7 km	MPC; JPL
13509 Guayaquil	1989 GU_{3}	Guayaquil	April 4, 1989	La Silla	E. W. Elst	SUL	10 km	MPC; JPL
13510	1989 OL	—	July 29, 1989	Lake Tekapo	A. C. Gilmore, P. M. Kilmartin	·	5.1 km	MPC; JPL
13511	1989 RD_{1}	—	September 5, 1989	Lake Tekapo	A. C. Gilmore, P. M. Kilmartin	EUN	7.6 km	MPC; JPL
13512	1989 TH_{1}	—	October 8, 1989	Dynic	A. Sugie	·	10 km	MPC; JPL
13513 Manila	1990 EL_{2}	Manila	March 2, 1990	La Silla	E. W. Elst	·	1.9 km	MPC; JPL
13514 Mikerudenko	1990 MR	Mikerudenko	June 18, 1990	Palomar	H. E. Holt	·	4.8 km	MPC; JPL
13515	1990 SG_{12}	—	September 19, 1990	Palomar	H. E. Holt	(5)	3.6 km	MPC; JPL
13516	1990 UO_{1}	—	October 20, 1990	Dynic	A. Sugie	·	3.7 km	MPC; JPL
13517	1990 UU_{1}	—	October 20, 1990	Siding Spring	R. H. McNaught	EUN	3.1 km	MPC; JPL
13518	1990 VL_{1}	—	November 12, 1990	Kushiro	S. Ueda, H. Kaneda	·	4.3 km	MPC; JPL
13519	1990 VM_{3}	—	November 15, 1990	Dynic	A. Sugie	·	5.5 km	MPC; JPL
13520 Félicienrops	1990 VC_{6}	Félicienrops	November 15, 1990	La Silla	E. W. Elst	·	7.2 km	MPC; JPL
13521	1991 BK	—	January 19, 1991	Okutama	Hioki, T., Hayakawa, S.	slow	7.5 km	MPC; JPL
13522	1991 FG	—	March 18, 1991	Siding Spring	R. H. McNaught	·	4.2 km	MPC; JPL
13523 Vanhassel	1991 LU_{1}	Vanhassel	June 6, 1991	La Silla	E. W. Elst	·	7.1 km	MPC; JPL
13524	1991 OO	—	July 18, 1991	Palomar	H. E. Holt	·	2.8 km	MPC; JPL
13525 Paulledoux	1991 PG_{3}	Paulledoux	August 2, 1991	La Silla	E. W. Elst	·	8.7 km	MPC; JPL
13526 Libbrecht	1991 PQ_{5}	Libbrecht	August 3, 1991	La Silla	E. W. Elst	·	2.6 km	MPC; JPL
13527	1991 PJ_{15}	—	August 7, 1991	Palomar	H. E. Holt	·	3.0 km	MPC; JPL
13528	1991 PM_{16}	—	August 7, 1991	Palomar	H. E. Holt	PHO	3.6 km	MPC; JPL
13529 Yokaboshi	1991 RE_{1}	Yokaboshi	September 1, 1991	Geisei	T. Seki	·	4.8 km	MPC; JPL
13530 Ninnemann	1991 RS_{2}	Ninnemann	September 9, 1991	Tautenburg Observatory	L. D. Schmadel, F. Börngen	V	4.8 km	MPC; JPL
13531 Weizsäcker	1991 RU_{4}	Weizsäcker	September 13, 1991	Tautenburg Observatory	F. Börngen, L. D. Schmadel	·	8.7 km	MPC; JPL
13532	1991 RY_{8}	—	September 11, 1991	Palomar	H. E. Holt	·	3.0 km	MPC; JPL
13533 Junili	1991 RJ_{11}	Junili	September 4, 1991	La Silla	E. W. Elst	·	10 km	MPC; JPL
13534 Alain-Fournier	1991 RZ_{11}	Alain-Fournier	September 4, 1991	La Silla	E. W. Elst	THM	11 km	MPC; JPL
13535	1991 RS_{13}	—	September 13, 1991	Palomar	H. E. Holt	·	4.0 km	MPC; JPL
13536	1991 RA_{15}	—	September 15, 1991	Palomar	H. E. Holt	THM	11 km	MPC; JPL
13537	1991 SG	—	September 29, 1991	Siding Spring	R. H. McNaught	VER	13 km	MPC; JPL
13538	1991 ST	—	September 30, 1991	Siding Spring	R. H. McNaught	·	4.8 km	MPC; JPL
13539	1991 TY	—	October 2, 1991	Siding Spring	R. H. McNaught	·	4.6 km	MPC; JPL
13540 Kazukitakahashi	1991 UR_{1}	Kazukitakahashi	October 29, 1991	Kitami	A. Takahashi, K. Watanabe	·	4.6 km	MPC; JPL
13541	1991 VP_{3}	—	November 4, 1991	Kushiro	S. Ueda, H. Kaneda	·	5.5 km	MPC; JPL
13542	1991 VC_{5}	—	November 10, 1991	Kiyosato	S. Otomo	V	4.3 km	MPC; JPL
13543 Butler	1992 AO_{2}	Butler	January 2, 1992	Kitt Peak	Spacewatch	·	5.0 km	MPC; JPL
13544	1992 DU_{5}	—	February 29, 1992	La Silla	UESAC	BRG	4.9 km	MPC; JPL
13545	1992 DZ_{5}	—	February 29, 1992	La Silla	UESAC	·	3.5 km	MPC; JPL
13546	1992 DF_{8}	—	February 29, 1992	La Silla	UESAC	·	5.1 km	MPC; JPL
13547	1992 DJ_{8}	—	February 29, 1992	La Silla	UESAC	·	2.6 km	MPC; JPL
13548	1992 ER_{1}	—	March 8, 1992	Kushiro	S. Ueda, H. Kaneda	·	5.3 km	MPC; JPL
13549	1992 EW_{7}	—	March 2, 1992	La Silla	UESAC	·	6.8 km	MPC; JPL
13550	1992 EX_{9}	—	March 2, 1992	La Silla	UESAC	(5)	4.3 km	MPC; JPL
13551 Gadsden	1992 FL_{1}	Gadsden	March 26, 1992	Siding Spring	R. H. McNaught	·	1.7 km	MPC; JPL
13552	1992 GA	—	April 4, 1992	Lake Tekapo	A. C. Gilmore, P. M. Kilmartin	EUN	5.3 km	MPC; JPL
13553 Masaakikoyama	1992 JE	Masaakikoyama	May 2, 1992	Geisei	T. Seki	AMO +1km	1.7 km	MPC; JPL
13554 Decleir	1992 JL_{1}	Decleir	May 8, 1992	La Silla	H. Debehogne	·	5.9 km	MPC; JPL
13555	1992 JB_{2}	—	May 2, 1992	La Silla	H. Debehogne	·	13 km	MPC; JPL
13556	1992 OY_{7}	—	July 21, 1992	La Silla	H. Debehogne, Á. López-G.	·	10 km	MPC; JPL
13557 Lievetruwant	1992 OB_{9}	Lievetruwant	July 24, 1992	La Silla	H. Debehogne	·	6.2 km	MPC; JPL
13558	1992 PR_{6}	—	August 5, 1992	La Silla	H. Debehogne, Á. López-G.	·	8.1 km	MPC; JPL
13559 Werth	1992 RD_{1}	Werth	September 4, 1992	Tautenburg Observatory	L. D. Schmadel, F. Börngen	·	11 km	MPC; JPL
13560 La Pérouse	1992 RX_{6}	La Pérouse	September 2, 1992	La Silla	E. W. Elst	EOS	9.0 km	MPC; JPL
13561 Kudogou	1992 SB_{1}	Kudogou	September 23, 1992	Kitami	M. Yanai, K. Watanabe	·	20 km	MPC; JPL
13562 Bobeggleton	1992 SF_{11}	Bobeggleton	September 28, 1992	Kitt Peak	Spacewatch	THM	7.6 km	MPC; JPL
13563	1992 UW	—	October 21, 1992	Kiyosato	S. Otomo	·	4.8 km	MPC; JPL
13564 Kodomomiraikan	1992 UH_{1}	Kodomomiraikan	October 19, 1992	Kitami	M. Yanai, K. Watanabe	·	2.2 km	MPC; JPL
13565 Yotakanashi	1992 UZ_{5}	Yotakanashi	October 28, 1992	Kitami	K. Endate, K. Watanabe	·	12 km	MPC; JPL
13566	1992 UM_{9}	—	October 19, 1992	Kushiro	S. Ueda, H. Kaneda	·	12 km	MPC; JPL
13567 Urabe	1992 WF_{1}	Urabe	November 16, 1992	Kitami	K. Endate, K. Watanabe	EOS	13 km	MPC; JPL
13568	1992 WL_{3}	—	November 21, 1992	Uenohara	N. Kawasato	·	15 km	MPC; JPL
13569 Oshu	1993 EJ	Oshu	March 4, 1993	Geisei	T. Seki	V	2.3 km	MPC; JPL
13570	1993 FH_{7}	—	March 17, 1993	La Silla	UESAC	NYS	4.5 km	MPC; JPL
13571	1993 FT_{7}	—	March 17, 1993	La Silla	UESAC	V	2.3 km	MPC; JPL
13572	1993 FS_{12}	—	March 17, 1993	La Silla	UESAC	NYS	3.3 km	MPC; JPL
13573	1993 FZ_{18}	—	March 17, 1993	La Silla	UESAC	·	4.5 km	MPC; JPL
13574	1993 FX_{79}	—	March 21, 1993	La Silla	UESAC	·	8.2 km	MPC; JPL
13575	1993 GN	—	April 14, 1993	Kiyosato	S. Otomo	·	7.1 km	MPC; JPL
13576 Gotoyoshi	1993 HW	Gotoyoshi	April 16, 1993	Kitami	K. Endate, K. Watanabe	NYS	4.1 km	MPC; JPL
13577 Ukawa	1993 HR_{1}	Ukawa	April 16, 1993	Kitami	K. Endate, K. Watanabe	NYS	4.6 km	MPC; JPL
13578	1993 MK	—	June 17, 1993	Palomar	H. E. Holt	H	3.5 km	MPC; JPL
13579 Allodd	1993 NA_{2}	Allodd	July 12, 1993	La Silla	E. W. Elst	·	5.2 km	MPC; JPL
13580 de Saussure	1993 OQ_{5}	de Saussure	July 20, 1993	La Silla	E. W. Elst	·	6.4 km	MPC; JPL
13581	1993 QX_{4}	—	August 19, 1993	Palomar	E. F. Helin	MAR	7.5 km	MPC; JPL
13582 Tominari	1993 TN_{2}	Tominari	October 15, 1993	Kitami	K. Endate, K. Watanabe	EUN	6.9 km	MPC; JPL
13583 Bosret	1993 TN_{18}	Bosret	October 9, 1993	La Silla	E. W. Elst	·	8.0 km	MPC; JPL
13584	1993 TH_{19}	—	October 9, 1993	La Silla	E. W. Elst	·	4.4 km	MPC; JPL
13585 Justinsmith	1993 TC_{20}	Justinsmith	October 9, 1993	La Silla	E. W. Elst	AGN	5.6 km	MPC; JPL
13586 Copenhagen	1993 TY_{22}	Copenhagen	October 9, 1993	La Silla	E. W. Elst	EOS	8.4 km	MPC; JPL
13587	1993 TQ_{29}	—	October 9, 1993	La Silla	E. W. Elst	·	4.8 km	MPC; JPL
13588	1993 TU_{38}	—	October 9, 1993	La Silla	E. W. Elst	HOF	8.1 km	MPC; JPL
13589	1993 XM	—	December 8, 1993	Oizumi	T. Kobayashi	·	11 km	MPC; JPL
13590	1994 AC_{3}	—	January 14, 1994	Oizumi	T. Kobayashi	THM	8.2 km	MPC; JPL
13591	1994 BC_{1}	—	January 16, 1994	Oizumi	T. Kobayashi	·	8.0 km	MPC; JPL
13592	1994 JU	—	May 8, 1994	Oizumi	T. Kobayashi	·	3.4 km	MPC; JPL
13593	1994 NF_{1}	—	July 4, 1994	Palomar	E. F. Helin	slow	4.8 km	MPC; JPL
13594	1994 PC_{2}	—	August 9, 1994	Palomar	PCAS	·	3.0 km	MPC; JPL
13595	1994 PL_{3}	—	August 10, 1994	La Silla	E. W. Elst	·	2.9 km	MPC; JPL
13596	1994 PD_{18}	—	August 10, 1994	La Silla	E. W. Elst	V	3.2 km	MPC; JPL
13597	1994 PH_{18}	—	August 12, 1994	La Silla	E. W. Elst	·	3.0 km	MPC; JPL
13598	1994 PY_{19}	—	August 12, 1994	La Silla	E. W. Elst	NYS	4.6 km	MPC; JPL
13599 Lisbon	1994 PM_{21}	Lisbon	August 12, 1994	La Silla	E. W. Elst	·	3.4 km	MPC; JPL
13600	1994 PL_{26}	—	August 12, 1994	La Silla	E. W. Elst	·	3.4 km	MPC; JPL

== 13601–13700 ==
back to top

Designation			Discovery			Properties		Ref
Permanent	Provisional	Named after	Date	Site	Discoverer(s)	Category	Diam.	Ref
13601	1994 PU_{29}	—	August 12, 1994	La Silla	E. W. Elst	·	3.8 km	MPC; JPL
13602 Pierreboulez	1994 PB_{36}	Pierreboulez	August 10, 1994	La Silla	E. W. Elst	·	3.3 km	MPC; JPL
13603	1994 PV_{37}	—	August 10, 1994	La Silla	E. W. Elst	NYS	4.6 km	MPC; JPL
13604	1994 PA_{39}	—	August 10, 1994	La Silla	E. W. Elst	·	5.1 km	MPC; JPL
13605 Nakamuraminoru	1994 RV	Nakamuraminoru	September 1, 1994	Kitami	K. Endate, K. Watanabe	·	4.0 km	MPC; JPL
13606 Bean	1994 RN_{5}	Bean	September 11, 1994	Kitt Peak	Spacewatch	·	3.3 km	MPC; JPL
13607 Vicars	1994 SH_{11}	Vicars	September 29, 1994	Kitt Peak	Spacewatch	V	3.8 km	MPC; JPL
13608 Andosatoru	1994 TQ_{1}	Andosatoru	October 2, 1994	Kitami	K. Endate, K. Watanabe	fast?	4.4 km	MPC; JPL
13609 Lewicki	1994 TK_{11}	Lewicki	October 10, 1994	Kitt Peak	Spacewatch	·	5.5 km	MPC; JPL
13610 Lilienthal	1994 TS_{16}	Lilienthal	October 5, 1994	Tautenburg Observatory	F. Börngen	V	3.6 km	MPC; JPL
13611	1994 UM_{1}	—	October 25, 1994	Kushiro	S. Ueda, H. Kaneda	(5)	4.2 km	MPC; JPL
13612	1994 UQ_{1}	—	October 25, 1994	Kushiro	S. Ueda, H. Kaneda	(5)	3.6 km	MPC; JPL
13613	1994 UA_{3}	—	October 26, 1994	Kushiro	S. Ueda, H. Kaneda	MIS	6.4 km	MPC; JPL
13614	1994 VF_{2}	—	November 8, 1994	Kiyosato	S. Otomo	·	11 km	MPC; JPL
13615 Manulis	1994 WP_{13}	Manulis	November 28, 1994	Palomar	C. S. Shoemaker, D. H. Levy	·	5.5 km	MPC; JPL
13616	1994 XQ_{4}	—	December 7, 1994	Oizumi	T. Kobayashi	·	6.0 km	MPC; JPL
13617	1994 YA_{2}	—	December 29, 1994	Catalina Station	T. B. Spahr	HNS	5.7 km	MPC; JPL
13618	1995 BF_{2}	—	January 30, 1995	Oizumi	T. Kobayashi	EMA	11 km	MPC; JPL
13619	1995 DN_{1}	—	February 22, 1995	Oizumi	T. Kobayashi	·	12 km	MPC; JPL
13620 Moynahan	1995 FM_{3}	Moynahan	March 23, 1995	Kitt Peak	Spacewatch	·	9.4 km	MPC; JPL
13621	1995 GC_{7}	—	April 1, 1995	Nachi-Katsuura	Y. Shimizu, T. Urata	EOS	9.3 km	MPC; JPL
13622 McArthur	1995 HY_{2}	McArthur	April 26, 1995	Kitt Peak	Spacewatch	·	9.6 km	MPC; JPL
13623 Seanwalker	1995 TD	Seanwalker	October 3, 1995	Sudbury	D. di Cicco	·	2.6 km	MPC; JPL
13624 Abeosamu	1995 UO_{3}	Abeosamu	October 17, 1995	Nanyo	T. Okuni	·	2.7 km	MPC; JPL
13625	1995 UP_{3}	—	October 20, 1995	Oizumi	T. Kobayashi	·	4.9 km	MPC; JPL
13626	1995 UD_{4}	—	October 20, 1995	Oizumi	T. Kobayashi	·	2.6 km	MPC; JPL
13627 Yukitamayo	1995 VP_{1}	Yukitamayo	November 15, 1995	Kitami	K. Endate, K. Watanabe	·	3.4 km	MPC; JPL
13628	1995 WE	—	November 16, 1995	Oizumi	T. Kobayashi	·	4.5 km	MPC; JPL
13629	1995 WD_{2}	—	November 18, 1995	Oizumi	T. Kobayashi	·	3.2 km	MPC; JPL
13630	1995 WO_{3}	—	November 21, 1995	Farra d'Isonzo	Farra d'Isonzo	NYS	4.2 km	MPC; JPL
13631	1995 WL_{5}	—	November 24, 1995	Oizumi	T. Kobayashi	·	2.9 km	MPC; JPL
13632	1995 WP_{8}	—	November 18, 1995	Kushiro	S. Ueda, H. Kaneda	·	3.6 km	MPC; JPL
13633 Ivens	1995 WW_{17}	Ivens	November 17, 1995	Kitt Peak	Spacewatch	·	2.5 km	MPC; JPL
13634	1995 WY_{41}	—	November 16, 1995	Kushiro	S. Ueda, H. Kaneda	·	3.3 km	MPC; JPL
13635	1995 WA_{42}	—	November 22, 1995	Harvard Observatory	Oak Ridge Observatory	·	3.3 km	MPC; JPL
13636	1995 YS_{2}	—	December 22, 1995	Oohira	T. Urata	MAS	1.9 km	MPC; JPL
13637	1995 YO_{3}	—	December 27, 1995	Oizumi	T. Kobayashi	MAS	3.1 km	MPC; JPL
13638 Fiorenza	1996 CJ_{7}	Fiorenza	February 14, 1996	Cima Ekar	M. Tombelli, U. Munari	V	3.7 km	MPC; JPL
13639	1996 EG_{2}	—	March 10, 1996	Kushiro	S. Ueda, H. Kaneda	·	9.2 km	MPC; JPL
13640 Ohtateruaki	1996 GV_{1}	Ohtateruaki	April 12, 1996	Kitami	K. Endate, K. Watanabe	EUN	4.4 km	MPC; JPL
13641 de Lesseps	1996 GM_{20}	de Lesseps	April 15, 1996	La Silla	E. W. Elst	·	10 km	MPC; JPL
13642 Ricci	1996 HX	Ricci	April 19, 1996	Prescott	P. G. Comba	·	9.8 km	MPC; JPL
13643 Takushi	1996 HC_{1}	Takushi	April 21, 1996	Yatsuka	H. Abe	EUN	8.4 km	MPC; JPL
13644 Lynnanderson	1996 HR_{10}	Lynnanderson	April 17, 1996	La Silla	E. W. Elst	THM	9.2 km	MPC; JPL
13645	1996 HF_{11}	—	April 17, 1996	La Silla	E. W. Elst	·	7.9 km	MPC; JPL
13646	1996 HC_{12}	—	April 17, 1996	La Silla	E. W. Elst	KOR	3.8 km	MPC; JPL
13647 Rey	1996 HR_{24}	Rey	April 20, 1996	La Silla	E. W. Elst	·	8.3 km	MPC; JPL
13648	1996 JJ_{1}	—	May 15, 1996	Haleakala	NEAT	EOS	7.4 km	MPC; JPL
13649	1996 PM_{4}	—	August 12, 1996	Haleakala	NEAT	THM	12 km	MPC; JPL
13650 Perimedes	1996 TN_{49}	Perimedes	October 4, 1996	La Silla	E. W. Elst	L4	22 km	MPC; JPL
13651 Wugang	1997 BR	Wugang	January 20, 1997	Xinglong	SCAP	APO +1km · PHA	560 m	MPC; JPL
13652 Elowitz	1997 BV_{8}	Elowitz	January 31, 1997	Kitt Peak	Spacewatch	·	2.5 km	MPC; JPL
13653 Priscus	1997 CT_{16}	Priscus	February 9, 1997	Colleverde	V. S. Casulli	·	1.9 km	MPC; JPL
13654 Masuda	1997 CV_{21}	Masuda	February 9, 1997	Chichibu	N. Satō	·	2.2 km	MPC; JPL
13655	1997 ER_{2}	—	March 4, 1997	Oizumi	T. Kobayashi	·	4.3 km	MPC; JPL
13656	1997 EX_{45}	—	March 15, 1997	Xinglong	SCAP	·	3.1 km	MPC; JPL
13657 Badinter	1997 EB_{54}	Badinter	March 8, 1997	La Silla	E. W. Elst	NYS	6.5 km	MPC; JPL
13658 Sylvester	1997 FB	Sylvester	March 18, 1997	Prescott	P. G. Comba	·	2.3 km	MPC; JPL
13659	1997 FH_{4}	—	March 31, 1997	Socorro	LINEAR	·	2.8 km	MPC; JPL
13660	1997 GE_{8}	—	April 2, 1997	Socorro	LINEAR	·	2.9 km	MPC; JPL
13661	1997 GH_{8}	—	April 2, 1997	Socorro	LINEAR	·	3.8 km	MPC; JPL
13662	1997 GL_{11}	—	April 3, 1997	Socorro	LINEAR	·	2.7 km	MPC; JPL
13663	1997 GA_{14}	—	April 3, 1997	Socorro	LINEAR	NYS	4.3 km	MPC; JPL
13664	1997 GE_{17}	—	April 3, 1997	Socorro	LINEAR	·	1.7 km	MPC; JPL
13665	1997 GK_{17}	—	April 3, 1997	Socorro	LINEAR	·	2.5 km	MPC; JPL
13666	1997 GX_{22}	—	April 6, 1997	Socorro	LINEAR	MAS	2.6 km	MPC; JPL
13667 Samthurman	1997 GT_{37}	Samthurman	April 5, 1997	Haleakala	NEAT	NYS	3.9 km	MPC; JPL
13668 Tanner	1997 HQ_{1}	Tanner	April 28, 1997	Kitt Peak	Spacewatch	·	3.0 km	MPC; JPL
13669 Swammerdam	1997 JS_{14}	Swammerdam	May 3, 1997	La Silla	E. W. Elst	·	2.4 km	MPC; JPL
13670	1997 JD_{15}	—	May 3, 1997	La Silla	E. W. Elst	·	3.0 km	MPC; JPL
13671	1997 JH_{18}	—	May 3, 1997	La Silla	E. W. Elst	(5)	2.8 km	MPC; JPL
13672 Tarski	1997 KH	Tarski	May 30, 1997	Prescott	P. G. Comba	·	4.4 km	MPC; JPL
13673 Urysohn	1997 LC	Urysohn	June 1, 1997	Prescott	P. G. Comba	·	4.7 km	MPC; JPL
13674 Bourge	1997 MJ_{2}	Bourge	June 30, 1997	Caussols	ODAS	V	2.6 km	MPC; JPL
13675	1997 MZ_{2}	—	June 28, 1997	Socorro	LINEAR	·	5.9 km	MPC; JPL
13676	1997 MA_{4}	—	June 28, 1997	Socorro	LINEAR	KOR	5.0 km	MPC; JPL
13677 Alvin	1997 NK_{1}	Alvin	July 2, 1997	Kitt Peak	Spacewatch	·	9.1 km	MPC; JPL
13678 Shimada	1997 NE_{11}	Shimada	July 6, 1997	Nanyo	T. Okuni	·	8.2 km	MPC; JPL
13679 Shinanogawa	1997 OZ_{1}	Shinanogawa	July 29, 1997	Nanyo	T. Okuni	·	5.7 km	MPC; JPL
13680 Katyafrantseva	1997 PY	Katyafrantseva	August 4, 1997	Caussols	ODAS	KOR	3.7 km	MPC; JPL
13681 Monty Python	1997 PY_{1}	Monty Python	August 7, 1997	Kleť	M. Tichý, Z. Moravec	EOS	6.2 km	MPC; JPL
13682 Pressberger	1997 PG_{3}	Pressberger	August 10, 1997	Linz	E. Meyer, H. Raab	·	8.6 km	MPC; JPL
13683	1997 PV_{3}	—	August 8, 1997	Xinglong	SCAP	EOS	7.0 km	MPC; JPL
13684 Borbona	1997 QQ_{2}	Borbona	August 27, 1997	Colleverde	V. S. Casulli	·	17 km	MPC; JPL
13685	1997 QG_{4}	—	August 27, 1997	Nachi-Katsuura	Y. Shimizu, T. Urata	·	8.0 km	MPC; JPL
13686 Kongozan	1997 QS_{4}	Kongozan	August 30, 1997	Nanyo	T. Okuni	THM	11 km	MPC; JPL
13687	1997 RB_{7}	—	September 7, 1997	Church Stretton	S. P. Laurie	EOS	10 km	MPC; JPL
13688 Oklahoma	1997 RJ_{7}	Oklahoma	September 9, 1997	Zeno	T. Stafford	·	7.0 km	MPC; JPL
13689 Succi	1997 RO_{7}	Succi	September 9, 1997	Sormano	Giuliani, V.	VER	9.0 km	MPC; JPL
13690 Lesleymartin	1997 RG_{9}	Lesleymartin	September 8, 1997	Uccle	T. Pauwels	·	14 km	MPC; JPL
13691 Akie	1997 SL_{16}	Akie	September 30, 1997	Hadano Obs.	A. Asami	slow	6.6 km	MPC; JPL
13692	1997 SW_{30}	—	September 27, 1997	Črni Vrh	Mikuž, H.	·	7.4 km	MPC; JPL
13693 Bondar	1997 TW_{15}	Bondar	October 4, 1997	Kitt Peak	Spacewatch	·	5.0 km	MPC; JPL
13694	1997 WW_{7}	—	November 23, 1997	Chichibu	N. Satō	L4	29 km	MPC; JPL
13695	1998 FO_{52}	—	March 20, 1998	Socorro	LINEAR	·	7.4 km	MPC; JPL
13696	1998 HU_{43}	—	April 20, 1998	Socorro	LINEAR	·	3.9 km	MPC; JPL
13697	1998 HJ_{133}	—	April 19, 1998	Socorro	LINEAR	·	4.3 km	MPC; JPL
13698	1998 KF_{35}	—	May 22, 1998	Socorro	LINEAR	V	5.3 km	MPC; JPL
13699 Nickthomas	1998 MU_{7}	Nickthomas	June 18, 1998	Anderson Mesa	LONEOS	·	3.8 km	MPC; JPL
13700 Connors	1998 MM_{36}	Connors	June 26, 1998	Kitt Peak	Spacewatch	·	2.9 km	MPC; JPL

== 13701–13800 ==
back to top

Designation			Discovery			Properties		Ref
Permanent	Provisional	Named after	Date	Site	Discoverer(s)	Category	Diam.	Ref
13701 Roquebrune	1998 OR	Roquebrune	July 20, 1998	Caussols	ODAS	·	2.2 km	MPC; JPL
13702	1998 OE_{7}	—	July 28, 1998	Xinglong	SCAP	·	4.7 km	MPC; JPL
13703 Romero	1998 OR_{13}	Romero	July 26, 1998	La Silla	E. W. Elst	MAS	3.4 km	MPC; JPL
13704 Aletesi	1998 PA_{1}	Aletesi	August 13, 1998	San Marcello	L. Tesi	·	8.5 km	MPC; JPL
13705 Llapasset	1998 QJ_{2}	Llapasset	August 19, 1998	Bédoin	Bedoin	slow	2.8 km	MPC; JPL
13706	1998 QF_{3}	—	August 17, 1998	Socorro	LINEAR	PHO	3.7 km	MPC; JPL
13707	1998 QS_{9}	—	August 17, 1998	Socorro	LINEAR	·	5.5 km	MPC; JPL
13708	1998 QU_{9}	—	August 17, 1998	Socorro	LINEAR	·	3.6 km	MPC; JPL
13709	1998 QE_{13}	—	August 17, 1998	Socorro	LINEAR	·	3.8 km	MPC; JPL
13710 Shridhar	1998 QU_{13}	Shridhar	August 17, 1998	Socorro	LINEAR	·	2.6 km	MPC; JPL
13711	1998 QB_{26}	—	August 25, 1998	Višnjan Observatory	Višnjan	·	4.7 km	MPC; JPL
13712	1998 QL_{30}	—	August 23, 1998	Višnjan Observatory	Višnjan	·	3.9 km	MPC; JPL
13713	1998 QN_{30}	—	August 23, 1998	Višnjan Observatory	Višnjan	·	2.8 km	MPC; JPL
13714 Stainbrook	1998 QV_{38}	Stainbrook	August 17, 1998	Socorro	LINEAR	·	3.1 km	MPC; JPL
13715 Steed	1998 QK_{39}	Steed	August 17, 1998	Socorro	LINEAR	·	5.0 km	MPC; JPL
13716 Trevino	1998 QJ_{40}	Trevino	August 17, 1998	Socorro	LINEAR	V	3.5 km	MPC; JPL
13717 Vencill	1998 QM_{42}	Vencill	August 17, 1998	Socorro	LINEAR	·	2.5 km	MPC; JPL
13718 Welcker	1998 QR_{43}	Welcker	August 17, 1998	Socorro	LINEAR	·	2.1 km	MPC; JPL
13719	1998 QU_{45}	—	August 17, 1998	Socorro	LINEAR	·	2.8 km	MPC; JPL
13720	1998 QU_{50}	—	August 17, 1998	Socorro	LINEAR	·	12 km	MPC; JPL
13721 Kevinwelsh	1998 QX_{51}	Kevinwelsh	August 17, 1998	Socorro	LINEAR	·	1.9 km	MPC; JPL
13722 Campobagatin	1998 QO_{54}	Campobagatin	August 27, 1998	Anderson Mesa	LONEOS	·	7.2 km	MPC; JPL
13723 Kolokolova	1998 QY_{54}	Kolokolova	August 27, 1998	Anderson Mesa	LONEOS	MRX	4.3 km	MPC; JPL
13724 Schwehm	1998 QF_{55}	Schwehm	August 27, 1998	Anderson Mesa	LONEOS	·	3.4 km	MPC; JPL
13725	1998 QY_{55}	—	August 29, 1998	Višnjan Observatory	Višnjan	KOR	5.3 km	MPC; JPL
13726	1998 QV_{89}	—	August 24, 1998	Socorro	LINEAR	EOS	8.9 km	MPC; JPL
13727	1998 QU_{90}	—	August 28, 1998	Socorro	LINEAR	·	4.8 km	MPC; JPL
13728	1998 QC_{98}	—	August 28, 1998	Socorro	LINEAR	·	5.0 km	MPC; JPL
13729 Nicolewen	1998 RO_{22}	Nicolewen	September 14, 1998	Socorro	LINEAR	·	3.2 km	MPC; JPL
13730 Willis	1998 RE_{47}	Willis	September 14, 1998	Socorro	LINEAR	V	2.7 km	MPC; JPL
13731	1998 RG_{49}	—	September 14, 1998	Socorro	LINEAR	·	2.2 km	MPC; JPL
13732 Woodall	1998 RC_{56}	Woodall	September 14, 1998	Socorro	LINEAR	V	2.9 km	MPC; JPL
13733 Dylanyoung	1998 RA_{59}	Dylanyoung	September 14, 1998	Socorro	LINEAR	·	3.6 km	MPC; JPL
13734 Buklad	1998 RC_{66}	Buklad	September 14, 1998	Socorro	LINEAR	·	2.5 km	MPC; JPL
13735	1998 RZ_{67}	—	September 14, 1998	Socorro	LINEAR	·	7.1 km	MPC; JPL
13736	1998 RF_{71}	—	September 14, 1998	Socorro	LINEAR	·	5.4 km	MPC; JPL
13737	1998 RU_{76}	—	September 14, 1998	Socorro	LINEAR	·	9.1 km	MPC; JPL
13738	1998 SF_{1}	—	September 16, 1998	Caussols	ODAS	·	3.9 km	MPC; JPL
13739 Nancyworden	1998 SW_{1}	Nancyworden	September 16, 1998	Caussols	ODAS	EOS	13 km	MPC; JPL
13740 Lastrucci	1998 SL_{2}	Lastrucci	September 18, 1998	Montelupo	M. Tombelli, Masotti, E.	·	4.1 km	MPC; JPL
13741	1998 SH_{10}	—	September 17, 1998	Caussols	ODAS	AST	11 km	MPC; JPL
13742	1998 SX_{22}	—	September 23, 1998	Woomera	F. B. Zoltowski	MRX	3.3 km	MPC; JPL
13743 Rivkin	1998 SX_{23}	Rivkin	September 17, 1998	Anderson Mesa	LONEOS	·	2.3 km	MPC; JPL
13744 Rickline	1998 SY_{25}	Rickline	September 22, 1998	Anderson Mesa	LONEOS	·	11 km	MPC; JPL
13745 Mikecosta	1998 SL_{42}	Mikecosta	September 28, 1998	Kitt Peak	Spacewatch	·	3.7 km	MPC; JPL
13746	1998 SR_{43}	—	September 25, 1998	Xinglong	SCAP	KOR	4.4 km	MPC; JPL
13747	1998 SS_{43}	—	September 25, 1998	Xinglong	SCAP	·	5.2 km	MPC; JPL
13748 Radaly	1998 SC_{46}	Radaly	September 25, 1998	Kitt Peak	Spacewatch	·	10 km	MPC; JPL
13749	1998 SG_{49}	—	September 24, 1998	Višnjan Observatory	Višnjan	GEF	6.8 km	MPC; JPL
13750 Mattdawson	1998 ST_{54}	Mattdawson	September 16, 1998	Anderson Mesa	LONEOS	V	3.1 km	MPC; JPL
13751 Joelparker	1998 SS_{55}	Joelparker	September 16, 1998	Anderson Mesa	LONEOS	·	2.5 km	MPC; JPL
13752 Grantstokes	1998 SF_{58}	Grantstokes	September 17, 1998	Anderson Mesa	LONEOS	·	3.9 km	MPC; JPL
13753 Jennivirta	1998 SY_{59}	Jennivirta	September 17, 1998	Anderson Mesa	LONEOS	HYG	8.2 km	MPC; JPL
13754	1998 SB_{63}	—	September 25, 1998	Xinglong	SCAP	HNS	10 km	MPC; JPL
13755	1998 SR_{70}	—	September 21, 1998	La Silla	E. W. Elst	EOS	6.1 km	MPC; JPL
13756	1998 ST_{72}	—	September 21, 1998	La Silla	E. W. Elst	KOR	3.4 km	MPC; JPL
13757	1998 ST_{73}	—	September 21, 1998	La Silla	E. W. Elst	·	6.5 km	MPC; JPL
13758	1998 SN_{74}	—	September 21, 1998	La Silla	E. W. Elst	AGN	4.1 km	MPC; JPL
13759	1998 SK_{123}	—	September 26, 1998	Socorro	LINEAR	·	12 km	MPC; JPL
13760 Rodriguez	1998 SN_{123}	Rodriguez	September 26, 1998	Socorro	LINEAR	(5)	4.2 km	MPC; JPL
13761 Dorristaylor	1998 SA_{130}	Dorristaylor	September 26, 1998	Socorro	LINEAR	NYS	5.3 km	MPC; JPL
13762	1998 SG_{130}	—	September 26, 1998	Socorro	LINEAR	·	3.3 km	MPC; JPL
13763	1998 SO_{135}	—	September 26, 1998	Socorro	LINEAR	·	7.7 km	MPC; JPL
13764 Mcalanis	1998 SW_{135}	Mcalanis	September 26, 1998	Socorro	LINEAR	·	2.3 km	MPC; JPL
13765 Nansmith	1998 SM_{138}	Nansmith	September 26, 1998	Socorro	LINEAR	KOR	3.5 km	MPC; JPL
13766 Bonham	1998 SA_{139}	Bonham	September 26, 1998	Socorro	LINEAR	·	3.3 km	MPC; JPL
13767	1998 SF_{141}	—	September 26, 1998	Socorro	LINEAR	·	4.6 km	MPC; JPL
13768	1998 SS_{143}	—	September 18, 1998	La Silla	E. W. Elst	KOR	3.5 km	MPC; JPL
13769	1998 SV_{144}	—	September 20, 1998	La Silla	E. W. Elst	slow	3.8 km	MPC; JPL
13770 Commerson	1998 ST_{145}	Commerson	September 20, 1998	La Silla	E. W. Elst	·	4.4 km	MPC; JPL
13771	1998 SG_{159}	—	September 26, 1998	Socorro	LINEAR	·	4.6 km	MPC; JPL
13772 Livius	1998 SV_{163}	Livius	September 18, 1998	La Silla	E. W. Elst	EOS	9.5 km	MPC; JPL
13773	1998 TY_{17}	—	October 14, 1998	Višnjan Observatory	K. Korlević	·	5.3 km	MPC; JPL
13774 Spurný	1998 TW_{30}	Spurný	October 10, 1998	Anderson Mesa	LONEOS	·	6.0 km	MPC; JPL
13775 Thébault	1998 TL_{32}	Thébault	October 11, 1998	Anderson Mesa	LONEOS	·	8.8 km	MPC; JPL
13776	1998 UK_{1}	—	October 19, 1998	Woomera	F. B. Zoltowski	THM	6.7 km	MPC; JPL
13777 Cielobuio	1998 UV_{6}	Cielobuio	October 20, 1998	Sormano	M. Cavagna, A. Testa	KOR	4.7 km	MPC; JPL
13778	1998 US_{7}	—	October 22, 1998	Višnjan Observatory	K. Korlević	MAR	3.7 km	MPC; JPL
13779	1998 UY_{7}	—	October 23, 1998	Višnjan Observatory	K. Korlević	·	5.6 km	MPC; JPL
13780	1998 UZ_{8}	—	October 17, 1998	Xinglong	SCAP	L4	20 km	MPC; JPL
13781	1998 UO_{15}	—	October 23, 1998	Višnjan Observatory	K. Korlević	·	4.5 km	MPC; JPL
13782	1998 UM_{18}	—	October 28, 1998	Catalina	CSS	L4	25 km	MPC; JPL
13783	1998 UJ_{20}	—	October 20, 1998	Kushiro	S. Ueda, H. Kaneda	·	3.6 km	MPC; JPL
13784	1998 UN_{20}	—	October 23, 1998	Višnjan Observatory	K. Korlević	·	4.7 km	MPC; JPL
13785	1998 UR_{20}	—	October 29, 1998	Višnjan Observatory	K. Korlević	KOR	4.8 km	MPC; JPL
13786	1998 UV_{20}	—	October 29, 1998	Višnjan Observatory	K. Korlević	·	6.2 km	MPC; JPL
13787 Nagaishi	1998 UN_{23}	Nagaishi	October 26, 1998	Nanyo	T. Okuni	THM	10 km	MPC; JPL
13788 Dansolander	1998 UY_{26}	Dansolander	October 18, 1998	La Silla	E. W. Elst	CLO	8.2 km	MPC; JPL
13789	1998 UZ_{28}	—	October 18, 1998	La Silla	E. W. Elst	V	4.0 km	MPC; JPL
13790	1998 UF_{31}	—	October 17, 1998	Xinglong	SCAP	L4	19 km	MPC; JPL
13791	1998 VC	—	November 1, 1998	Gekko	T. Kagawa	NYS	3.5 km	MPC; JPL
13792 Kuščynskyj	1998 VG	Kuščynskyj	November 7, 1998	Kleť	J. Tichá, M. Tichý	·	11 km	MPC; JPL
13793 Laubernasconi	1998 VB_{4}	Laubernasconi	November 11, 1998	Caussols	ODAS	·	7.0 km	MPC; JPL
13794	1998 VD_{5}	—	November 11, 1998	Višnjan Observatory	K. Korlević	THM	10 km	MPC; JPL
13795	1998 VP_{20}	—	November 10, 1998	Socorro	LINEAR	THM	12 km	MPC; JPL
13796	1998 VB_{26}	—	November 10, 1998	Socorro	LINEAR	THM	8.8 km	MPC; JPL
13797	1998 VQ_{27}	—	November 10, 1998	Socorro	LINEAR	KOR	4.4 km	MPC; JPL
13798 Cecchini	1998 VK_{33}	Cecchini	November 15, 1998	Pian dei Termini	L. Tesi, A. Boattini	·	6.7 km	MPC; JPL
13799	1998 VC_{34}	—	November 14, 1998	Uenohara	N. Kawasato	KOR	3.6 km	MPC; JPL
13800	1998 VR_{36}	—	November 14, 1998	Socorro	LINEAR	EUN	7.1 km	MPC; JPL

== 13801–13900 ==
back to top

Designation			Discovery			Properties		Ref
Permanent	Provisional	Named after	Date	Site	Discoverer(s)	Category	Diam.	Ref
13801 Kohlhase	1998 VP_{44}	Kohlhase	November 11, 1998	Anderson Mesa	LONEOS	GEF	5.2 km	MPC; JPL
13802	1998 WR_{3}	—	November 18, 1998	Kushiro	S. Ueda, H. Kaneda	·	4.1 km	MPC; JPL
13803	1998 WU_{10}	—	November 21, 1998	Socorro	LINEAR	fast	3.3 km	MPC; JPL
13804 Hrazany	1998 XK	Hrazany	December 9, 1998	Kleť	M. Tichý, Z. Moravec	(1298)	13 km	MPC; JPL
13805	1998 XN_{3}	—	December 9, 1998	Oizumi	T. Kobayashi	THM	11 km	MPC; JPL
13806 Darmstrong	1998 XM_{6}	Darmstrong	December 8, 1998	Kitt Peak	Spacewatch	KOR	4.7 km	MPC; JPL
13807	1998 XE_{13}	—	December 15, 1998	Caussols	ODAS	KOR	4.6 km	MPC; JPL
13808 Davewilliams	1998 XG_{24}	Davewilliams	December 11, 1998	Kitt Peak	Spacewatch	URS	23 km	MPC; JPL
13809	1998 XJ_{40}	—	December 14, 1998	Socorro	LINEAR	·	15 km	MPC; JPL
13810	1998 XU_{51}	—	December 14, 1998	Socorro	LINEAR	·	14 km	MPC; JPL
13811	1998 XP_{92}	—	December 15, 1998	Socorro	LINEAR	EOS	12 km	MPC; JPL
13812	1998 YR	—	December 16, 1998	Oizumi	T. Kobayashi	·	13 km	MPC; JPL
13813	1998 YX	—	December 16, 1998	Oizumi	T. Kobayashi	EOS	10 km	MPC; JPL
13814	1998 YG_{3}	—	December 17, 1998	Oizumi	T. Kobayashi	EOS	9.3 km	MPC; JPL
13815 Furuya	1998 YF_{7}	Furuya	December 22, 1998	Hadano Obs.	A. Asami	·	16 km	MPC; JPL
13816 Stülpner	1998 YH_{27}	Stülpner	December 29, 1998	Drebach	J. Kandler	EUN	4.2 km	MPC; JPL
13817 Genobechetti	1999 RH_{39}	Genobechetti	September 8, 1999	Catalina	CSS	URS	18 km	MPC; JPL
13818 Ullery	1999 RE_{92}	Ullery	September 7, 1999	Socorro	LINEAR	·	3.7 km	MPC; JPL
13819	1999 SX_{5}	—	September 30, 1999	Socorro	LINEAR	·	3.9 km	MPC; JPL
13820 Schwartz	1999 VQ	Schwartz	November 1, 1999	Fountain Hills	C. W. Juels	THM	11 km	MPC; JPL
13821	1999 VE_{8}	—	November 8, 1999	Višnjan Observatory	K. Korlević	NYS	2.5 km	MPC; JPL
13822 Stevedodson	1999 VV_{17}	Stevedodson	November 2, 1999	Kitt Peak	Spacewatch	·	2.8 km	MPC; JPL
13823	1999 VO_{72}	—	November 15, 1999	Xinglong	SCAP	EOS	11 km	MPC; JPL
13824 Kramlik	1999 VG_{86}	Kramlik	November 5, 1999	Socorro	LINEAR	·	3.8 km	MPC; JPL
13825 Booth	1999 VJ_{87}	Booth	November 4, 1999	Socorro	LINEAR	·	4.1 km	MPC; JPL
13826	1999 WM	—	November 16, 1999	Oizumi	T. Kobayashi	·	4.4 km	MPC; JPL
13827	1999 WK_{4}	—	November 28, 1999	Oizumi	T. Kobayashi	·	3.7 km	MPC; JPL
13828	1999 WL_{6}	—	November 28, 1999	Višnjan Observatory	K. Korlević	KOR	3.4 km	MPC; JPL
13829	1999 WK_{18}	—	November 29, 1999	Višnjan Observatory	K. Korlević	THM	10 km	MPC; JPL
13830 ARLT	1999 XM_{7}	ARLT	December 4, 1999	Fountain Hills	C. W. Juels	AGN	5.9 km	MPC; JPL
13831	1999 XD_{8}	—	December 3, 1999	Oizumi	T. Kobayashi	·	3.5 km	MPC; JPL
13832	1999 XR_{13}	—	December 5, 1999	Socorro	LINEAR	CYB	38 km	MPC; JPL
13833	1999 XW_{13}	—	December 5, 1999	Socorro	LINEAR	EOS	10 km	MPC; JPL
13834	1999 XU_{18}	—	December 3, 1999	Socorro	LINEAR	·	4.9 km	MPC; JPL
13835	1999 XJ_{20}	—	December 5, 1999	Socorro	LINEAR	KOR	5.5 km	MPC; JPL
13836	1999 XF_{24}	—	December 6, 1999	Socorro	LINEAR	EUN	7.7 km	MPC; JPL
13837	1999 XF_{25}	—	December 6, 1999	Socorro	LINEAR	·	6.8 km	MPC; JPL
13838	1999 XW_{26}	—	December 6, 1999	Socorro	LINEAR	·	8.3 km	MPC; JPL
13839	1999 XF_{29}	—	December 6, 1999	Socorro	LINEAR	·	5.9 km	MPC; JPL
13840 Wayneanderson	1999 XW_{31}	Wayneanderson	December 6, 1999	Socorro	LINEAR	NYS	4.6 km	MPC; JPL
13841 Blankenship	1999 XO_{32}	Blankenship	December 6, 1999	Socorro	LINEAR	MAS	3.2 km	MPC; JPL
13842	1999 XR_{33}	—	December 6, 1999	Socorro	LINEAR	·	14 km	MPC; JPL
13843 Cowenbrown	1999 XQ_{34}	Cowenbrown	December 6, 1999	Socorro	LINEAR	·	2.5 km	MPC; JPL
13844	1999 XW_{34}	—	December 6, 1999	Socorro	LINEAR	·	4.0 km	MPC; JPL
13845 Jillburnett	1999 XL_{63}	Jillburnett	December 7, 1999	Socorro	LINEAR	THM	6.0 km	MPC; JPL
13846	1999 XV_{69}	—	December 7, 1999	Socorro	LINEAR	NYS	6.5 km	MPC; JPL
13847	1999 XC_{74}	—	December 7, 1999	Socorro	LINEAR	·	3.2 km	MPC; JPL
13848 Cioffi	1999 XD_{75}	Cioffi	December 7, 1999	Socorro	LINEAR	·	3.6 km	MPC; JPL
13849 Dunn	1999 XN_{86}	Dunn	December 7, 1999	Socorro	LINEAR	·	3.2 km	MPC; JPL
13850 Erman	1999 XO_{88}	Erman	December 7, 1999	Socorro	LINEAR	·	3.1 km	MPC; JPL
13851	1999 XB_{94}	—	December 7, 1999	Socorro	LINEAR	·	23 km	MPC; JPL
13852 Ford	1999 XM_{96}	Ford	December 7, 1999	Socorro	LINEAR	·	3.7 km	MPC; JPL
13853 Jenniferfritz	1999 XR_{96}	Jenniferfritz	December 7, 1999	Socorro	LINEAR	·	6.6 km	MPC; JPL
13854	1999 XX_{104}	—	December 10, 1999	Oizumi	T. Kobayashi	slow	7.2 km	MPC; JPL
13855	1999 XX_{105}	—	December 11, 1999	Oizumi	T. Kobayashi	V	3.0 km	MPC; JPL
13856	1999 XZ_{105}	—	December 11, 1999	Oizumi	T. Kobayashi	ADE	15 km	MPC; JPL
13857 Stafford	1999 XE_{109}	Stafford	December 4, 1999	Catalina	CSS	·	3.8 km	MPC; JPL
13858 Ericchristensen	1999 XT_{110}	Ericchristensen	December 5, 1999	Catalina	CSS	·	3.1 km	MPC; JPL
13859 Fredtreasure	1999 XQ_{136}	Fredtreasure	December 13, 1999	Fountain Hills	C. W. Juels	·	15 km	MPC; JPL
13860 Neely	1999 XH_{143}	Neely	December 15, 1999	Fountain Hills	C. W. Juels	·	26 km	MPC; JPL
13861	1999 XE_{157}	—	December 8, 1999	Socorro	LINEAR	THM	6.6 km	MPC; JPL
13862 Elais	1999 XT_{160}	Elais	December 8, 1999	Socorro	LINEAR	L4 · ERY	25 km	MPC; JPL
13863	1999 XE_{166}	—	December 10, 1999	Socorro	LINEAR	·	9.3 km	MPC; JPL
13864	1999 XU_{166}	—	December 10, 1999	Socorro	LINEAR	(2076)	4.6 km	MPC; JPL
13865	1999 XA_{170}	—	December 10, 1999	Socorro	LINEAR	LEO	8.5 km	MPC; JPL
13866	1999 XS_{174}	—	December 10, 1999	Socorro	LINEAR	·	4.6 km	MPC; JPL
13867	1999 XR_{182}	—	December 12, 1999	Socorro	LINEAR	·	5.8 km	MPC; JPL
13868 Catalonia	1999 YZ_{8}	Catalonia	December 29, 1999	Piera	Guarro, J.	·	3.1 km	MPC; JPL
13869 Fruge	2000 AR_{194}	Fruge	January 8, 2000	Socorro	LINEAR	·	3.6 km	MPC; JPL
13870	2158 P-L	—	September 24, 1960	Palomar	C. J. van Houten, I. van Houten-Groeneveld, T. Gehrels	·	4.2 km	MPC; JPL
13871	2635 P-L	—	September 24, 1960	Palomar	C. J. van Houten, I. van Houten-Groeneveld, T. Gehrels	·	6.1 km	MPC; JPL
13872	2649 P-L	—	September 24, 1960	Palomar	C. J. van Houten, I. van Houten-Groeneveld, T. Gehrels	·	4.8 km	MPC; JPL
13873	2657 P-L	—	September 24, 1960	Palomar	C. J. van Houten, I. van Houten-Groeneveld, T. Gehrels	·	7.1 km	MPC; JPL
13874	3013 P-L	—	September 24, 1960	Palomar	C. J. van Houten, I. van Houten-Groeneveld, T. Gehrels	·	12 km	MPC; JPL
13875	4525 P-L	—	September 24, 1960	Palomar	C. J. van Houten, I. van Houten-Groeneveld, T. Gehrels	THM	8.2 km	MPC; JPL
13876	4625 P-L	—	September 24, 1960	Palomar	C. J. van Houten, I. van Houten-Groeneveld, T. Gehrels	·	4.3 km	MPC; JPL
13877	6063 P-L	—	September 24, 1960	Palomar	C. J. van Houten, I. van Houten-Groeneveld, T. Gehrels	·	2.2 km	MPC; JPL
13878	6106 P-L	—	September 24, 1960	Palomar	C. J. van Houten, I. van Houten-Groeneveld, T. Gehrels	·	3.4 km	MPC; JPL
13879	6328 P-L	—	September 24, 1960	Palomar	C. J. van Houten, I. van Houten-Groeneveld, T. Gehrels	·	3.2 km	MPC; JPL
13880 Wayneclark	6607 P-L	Wayneclark	September 24, 1960	Palomar	C. J. van Houten, I. van Houten-Groeneveld, T. Gehrels	·	6.2 km	MPC; JPL
13881	6625 P-L	—	September 24, 1960	Palomar	C. J. van Houten, I. van Houten-Groeneveld, T. Gehrels	·	3.3 km	MPC; JPL
13882	6637 P-L	—	September 24, 1960	Palomar	C. J. van Houten, I. van Houten-Groeneveld, T. Gehrels	·	2.5 km	MPC; JPL
13883	7066 P-L	—	October 17, 1960	Palomar	C. J. van Houten, I. van Houten-Groeneveld, T. Gehrels	·	11 km	MPC; JPL
13884	1064 T-1	—	March 25, 1971	Palomar	C. J. van Houten, I. van Houten-Groeneveld, T. Gehrels	·	1.6 km	MPC; JPL
13885	2104 T-1	—	March 25, 1971	Palomar	C. J. van Houten, I. van Houten-Groeneveld, T. Gehrels	NYS	3.9 km	MPC; JPL
13886	2312 T-1	—	March 25, 1971	Palomar	C. J. van Houten, I. van Houten-Groeneveld, T. Gehrels	KOR	5.3 km	MPC; JPL
13887	3041 T-1	—	March 26, 1971	Palomar	C. J. van Houten, I. van Houten-Groeneveld, T. Gehrels	·	5.6 km	MPC; JPL
13888	3290 T-1	—	March 26, 1971	Palomar	C. J. van Houten, I. van Houten-Groeneveld, T. Gehrels	V	2.3 km	MPC; JPL
13889	4206 T-1	—	March 26, 1971	Palomar	C. J. van Houten, I. van Houten-Groeneveld, T. Gehrels	·	4.0 km	MPC; JPL
13890	1186 T-2	—	September 29, 1973	Palomar	C. J. van Houten, I. van Houten-Groeneveld, T. Gehrels	CYB	12 km	MPC; JPL
13891	1237 T-2	—	September 29, 1973	Palomar	C. J. van Houten, I. van Houten-Groeneveld, T. Gehrels	KOR	3.4 km	MPC; JPL
13892	1266 T-2	—	September 29, 1973	Palomar	C. J. van Houten, I. van Houten-Groeneveld, T. Gehrels	·	4.9 km	MPC; JPL
13893	1296 T-2	—	September 29, 1973	Palomar	C. J. van Houten, I. van Houten-Groeneveld, T. Gehrels	·	2.9 km	MPC; JPL
13894	2039 T-2	—	September 29, 1973	Palomar	C. J. van Houten, I. van Houten-Groeneveld, T. Gehrels	V	3.1 km	MPC; JPL
13895 Letkasagjonica	2168 T-2	Letkasagjonica	September 29, 1973	Palomar	C. J. van Houten, I. van Houten-Groeneveld, T. Gehrels	KOR	4.0 km	MPC; JPL
13896	3310 T-2	—	September 30, 1973	Palomar	C. J. van Houten, I. van Houten-Groeneveld, T. Gehrels	·	3.1 km	MPC; JPL
13897 Vesuvius	4216 T-2	Vesuvius	September 29, 1973	Palomar	C. J. van Houten, I. van Houten-Groeneveld, T. Gehrels	HIL · 3:2	15 km	MPC; JPL
13898	4834 T-2	—	September 25, 1973	Palomar	C. J. van Houten, I. van Houten-Groeneveld, T. Gehrels	·	3.1 km	MPC; JPL
13899	5036 T-2	—	September 25, 1973	Palomar	C. J. van Houten, I. van Houten-Groeneveld, T. Gehrels	·	4.3 km	MPC; JPL
13900	5211 T-2	—	September 25, 1973	Palomar	C. J. van Houten, I. van Houten-Groeneveld, T. Gehrels	·	6.7 km	MPC; JPL

== 13901–14000 ==
back to top

Designation			Discovery			Properties		Ref
Permanent	Provisional	Named after	Date	Site	Discoverer(s)	Category	Diam.	Ref
13901	1140 T-3	—	October 17, 1977	Palomar	C. J. van Houten, I. van Houten-Groeneveld, T. Gehrels	·	6.3 km	MPC; JPL
13902	4205 T-3	—	October 16, 1977	Palomar	C. J. van Houten, I. van Houten-Groeneveld, T. Gehrels	·	4.4 km	MPC; JPL
13903 Darrylwatanabe	1975 ST	Darrylwatanabe	September 30, 1975	Palomar	S. J. Bus	·	8.8 km	MPC; JPL
13904 Univinnitsa	1975 TJ_{3}	Univinnitsa	October 3, 1975	Nauchnij	L. I. Chernykh	·	10 km	MPC; JPL
13905 Maxbernstein	1976 QA	Maxbernstein	August 27, 1976	Palomar	S. J. Bus	·	8.0 km	MPC; JPL
13906 Shunda	1977 QD_{2}	Shunda	August 20, 1977	Nauchnij	N. S. Chernykh	(2076)	2.8 km	MPC; JPL
13907	1977 RS_{17}	—	September 9, 1977	Palomar	C. M. Olmstead	·	5.2 km	MPC; JPL
13908 Wölbern	1978 RH_{9}	Wölbern	September 2, 1978	La Silla	C.-I. Lagerkvist	·	1.9 km	MPC; JPL
13909	1978 VD_{8}	—	November 7, 1978	Palomar	E. F. Helin, S. J. Bus	·	1.9 km	MPC; JPL
13910 Iranolt	1979 MH_{3}	Iranolt	June 25, 1979	Siding Spring	E. F. Helin, S. J. Bus	·	3.5 km	MPC; JPL
13911 Stempels	1979 QT_{1}	Stempels	August 22, 1979	La Silla	C.-I. Lagerkvist	fast	3.2 km	MPC; JPL
13912 Gammelgarn	1979 QA_{2}	Gammelgarn	August 22, 1979	La Silla	C.-I. Lagerkvist	MAS	3.7 km	MPC; JPL
13913	1979 SO	—	September 25, 1979	Kleť	A. Mrkos	DOR	12 km	MPC; JPL
13914 Galegant	1980 LC_{1}	Galegant	June 11, 1980	Palomar	C. S. Shoemaker	·	12 km	MPC; JPL
13915 Yalow	1982 KH_{1}	Yalow	May 27, 1982	Palomar	C. S. Shoemaker, S. J. Bus	·	10 km	MPC; JPL
13916 Bernolák	1982 QA_{2}	Bernolák	August 23, 1982	Piszkéstető	M. Antal	·	3.3 km	MPC; JPL
13917 Correggia	1984 EQ	Correggia	March 6, 1984	Anderson Mesa	E. Bowell	·	13 km	MPC; JPL
13918 Tsukinada	1984 QB	Tsukinada	August 24, 1984	Geisei	T. Seki	·	7.0 km	MPC; JPL
13919	1984 SO_{4}	—	September 21, 1984	La Silla	H. Debehogne	·	4.5 km	MPC; JPL
13920 Montecorvino	1985 PE_{1}	Montecorvino	August 15, 1985	Anderson Mesa	E. Bowell	moon	3.6 km	MPC; JPL
13921 Sgarbini	1985 RP	Sgarbini	September 14, 1985	Anderson Mesa	E. Bowell	·	4.4 km	MPC; JPL
13922 Kremenia	1985 SX_{2}	Kremenia	September 19, 1985	Nauchnij	N. S. Chernykh, L. I. Chernykh	·	5.3 km	MPC; JPL
13923 Peterhof	1985 UA_{5}	Peterhof	October 22, 1985	Nauchnij	L. V. Zhuravleva	·	9.1 km	MPC; JPL
13924	1986 PE_{1}	—	August 1, 1986	Palomar	E. F. Helin	·	6.1 km	MPC; JPL
13925	1986 QS_{3}	—	August 29, 1986	La Silla	H. Debehogne	EOS	9.2 km	MPC; JPL
13926 Berners-Lee	1986 XT	Berners-Lee	December 2, 1986	Anderson Mesa	E. Bowell	·	2.9 km	MPC; JPL
13927 Grundy	1987 SV_{3}	Grundy	September 26, 1987	Anderson Mesa	E. Bowell	·	3.7 km	MPC; JPL
13928 Aaronrogers	1987 UT	Aaronrogers	October 26, 1987	Anderson Mesa	E. Bowell	·	4.2 km	MPC; JPL
13929	1988 PL	—	August 13, 1988	Siding Spring	R. H. McNaught	·	2.5 km	MPC; JPL
13930 Tashko	1988 RQ_{8}	Tashko	September 12, 1988	Smolyan	V. G. Ivanova	·	3.1 km	MPC; JPL
13931 Tonydenault	1988 RF_{13}	Tonydenault	September 14, 1988	Cerro Tololo	S. J. Bus	·	10 km	MPC; JPL
13932 Rupprecht	1988 SL_{1}	Rupprecht	September 18, 1988	La Silla	ESO	·	1.8 km	MPC; JPL
13933 Charleville	1988 VE_{1}	Charleville	November 2, 1988	Geisei	T. Seki	·	11 km	MPC; JPL
13934 Kannami	1988 XE_{2}	Kannami	December 11, 1988	Gekko	Y. Oshima	·	4.7 km	MPC; JPL
13935	1989 EE	—	March 4, 1989	Palomar	E. F. Helin	T_{j} (2.96)	9.8 km	MPC; JPL
13936	1989 HC	—	April 30, 1989	Palomar	E. F. Helin	·	20 km	MPC; JPL
13937 Roberthargraves	1989 PU	Roberthargraves	August 2, 1989	Palomar	C. S. Shoemaker, E. M. Shoemaker	·	5.5 km	MPC; JPL
13938	1989 RP_{1}	—	September 5, 1989	Palomar	E. F. Helin	·	7.9 km	MPC; JPL
13939	1989 SJ_{2}	—	September 26, 1989	La Silla	E. W. Elst	EUN	4.2 km	MPC; JPL
13940	1989 SZ_{3}	—	September 26, 1989	La Silla	E. W. Elst	·	4.3 km	MPC; JPL
13941	1989 TF_{14}	—	October 2, 1989	La Silla	H. Debehogne	·	4.2 km	MPC; JPL
13942 Shiratakihime	1989 VS_{2}	Shiratakihime	November 2, 1989	Kitami	K. Endate, K. Watanabe	EUN	7.0 km	MPC; JPL
13943 Hankgreen	1990 HG	Hankgreen	April 26, 1990	Palomar	E. F. Helin	PHO	4.2 km	MPC; JPL
13944	1990 OX_{1}	—	July 29, 1990	Palomar	H. E. Holt	·	4.8 km	MPC; JPL
13945	1990 OH_{2}	—	July 29, 1990	Palomar	H. E. Holt	·	17 km	MPC; JPL
13946	1990 OK_{3}	—	July 27, 1990	Palomar	H. E. Holt	NYS	3.3 km	MPC; JPL
13947	1990 QB_{5}	—	August 24, 1990	Palomar	H. E. Holt	·	6.2 km	MPC; JPL
13948	1990 QB_{6}	—	August 24, 1990	Palomar	H. E. Holt	PHO	10 km	MPC; JPL
13949	1990 RN_{3}	—	September 14, 1990	Palomar	H. E. Holt	·	6.1 km	MPC; JPL
13950	1990 RP_{9}	—	September 14, 1990	Palomar	H. E. Holt	V	3.5 km	MPC; JPL
13951	1990 SD_{5}	—	September 22, 1990	La Silla	E. W. Elst	NYS	3.1 km	MPC; JPL
13952 Nykvist	1990 SN_{6}	Nykvist	September 22, 1990	La Silla	E. W. Elst	·	6.3 km	MPC; JPL
13953	1990 TO_{4}	—	October 9, 1990	Siding Spring	R. H. McNaught	·	4.6 km	MPC; JPL
13954 Born	1990 TF_{8}	Born	October 13, 1990	Tautenburg Observatory	F. Börngen, L. D. Schmadel	·	5.8 km	MPC; JPL
13955	1990 UA_{2}	—	October 21, 1990	Oohira	T. Urata	·	2.9 km	MPC; JPL
13956 Banks	1990 VG_{6}	Banks	November 15, 1990	La Silla	E. W. Elst	·	6.9 km	MPC; JPL
13957 NARIT	1991 AG_{2}	NARIT	January 7, 1991	Siding Spring	R. H. McNaught	·	8.5 km	MPC; JPL
13958	1991 DY	—	February 19, 1991	Palomar	E. F. Helin	·	9.4 km	MPC; JPL
13959	1991 EL_{4}	—	March 12, 1991	La Silla	H. Debehogne	EUN	6.5 km	MPC; JPL
13960	1991 GF_{8}	—	April 8, 1991	La Silla	E. W. Elst	GEF	4.7 km	MPC; JPL
13961	1991 PV	—	August 5, 1991	Palomar	H. E. Holt	·	2.2 km	MPC; JPL
13962 Delambre	1991 PO_{4}	Delambre	August 3, 1991	La Silla	E. W. Elst	THM	12 km	MPC; JPL
13963 Euphrates	1991 PT_{4}	Euphrates	August 3, 1991	La Silla	E. W. Elst	(11097) · CYB · 2:1J	9.2 km	MPC; JPL
13964 La Billardière	1991 PO_{5}	La Billardière	August 3, 1991	La Silla	E. W. Elst	THM	11 km	MPC; JPL
13965	1991 PL_{8}	—	August 5, 1991	Palomar	H. E. Holt	THM	7.8 km	MPC; JPL
13966	1991 PR_{16}	—	August 7, 1991	Palomar	H. E. Holt	·	2.8 km	MPC; JPL
13967	1991 QJ	—	August 31, 1991	Kiyosato	S. Otomo	·	3.0 km	MPC; JPL
13968	1991 RE_{7}	—	September 2, 1991	Siding Spring	R. H. McNaught	·	18 km	MPC; JPL
13969	1991 RK_{26}	—	September 11, 1991	Palomar	H. E. Holt	·	2.8 km	MPC; JPL
13970	1991 RH_{27}	—	September 13, 1991	Palomar	H. E. Holt	·	3.1 km	MPC; JPL
13971	1991 UF_{1}	—	October 18, 1991	Kushiro	S. Ueda, H. Kaneda	NYS	3.7 km	MPC; JPL
13972	1991 UN_{3}	—	October 31, 1991	Kushiro	S. Ueda, H. Kaneda	·	3.8 km	MPC; JPL
13973	1991 UZ_{3}	—	October 31, 1991	Kushiro	S. Ueda, H. Kaneda	MAS	2.1 km	MPC; JPL
13974	1991 YC	—	December 28, 1991	Yakiimo	Natori, A., T. Urata	·	6.5 km	MPC; JPL
13975 Beatrixpotter	1992 BP_{2}	Beatrixpotter	January 30, 1992	La Silla	E. W. Elst	·	2.7 km	MPC; JPL
13976	1992 EZ_{6}	—	March 1, 1992	La Silla	UESAC	slow	4.0 km	MPC; JPL
13977 Frisch	1992 HJ_{7}	Frisch	April 29, 1992	Tautenburg Observatory	F. Börngen	PHO ·	9.3 km	MPC; JPL
13978 Hiwasa	1992 JQ	Hiwasa	May 4, 1992	Geisei	T. Seki	·	6.0 km	MPC; JPL
13979	1992 JH_{3}	—	May 8, 1992	La Silla	H. Debehogne	·	11 km	MPC; JPL
13980 Neuhauser	1992 NS	Neuhauser	July 2, 1992	Palomar	E. F. Helin	ADE	10 km	MPC; JPL
13981	1992 OT_{9}	—	July 28, 1992	La Silla	H. Debehogne, Á. López-G.	·	5.9 km	MPC; JPL
13982 Thunberg	1992 RB_{3}	Thunberg	September 2, 1992	La Silla	E. W. Elst	·	5.7 km	MPC; JPL
13983	1992 RJ_{5}	—	September 2, 1992	La Silla	E. W. Elst	·	11 km	MPC; JPL
13984	1992 RM_{7}	—	September 2, 1992	La Silla	E. W. Elst	THM	8.0 km	MPC; JPL
13985	1992 UH_{3}	—	October 22, 1992	Kushiro	S. Ueda, H. Kaneda	·	3.1 km	MPC; JPL
13986	1992 WA_{4}	—	November 21, 1992	Kushiro	S. Ueda, H. Kaneda	HYG	12 km	MPC; JPL
13987	1992 WK_{9}	—	November 16, 1992	Kushiro	S. Ueda, H. Kaneda	·	8.5 km	MPC; JPL
13988	1992 YG_{2}	—	December 18, 1992	Caussols	E. W. Elst	·	2.5 km	MPC; JPL
13989 Murikabushi	1993 BG	Murikabushi	January 16, 1993	Geisei	T. Seki	·	5.0 km	MPC; JPL
13990	1993 EK	—	March 2, 1993	Oohira	T. Urata	·	2.7 km	MPC; JPL
13991 Kenphillips	1993 FZ_{6}	Kenphillips	March 17, 1993	La Silla	UESAC	NYS	4.3 km	MPC; JPL
13992 Cesarebarbieri	1993 FL_{8}	Cesarebarbieri	March 17, 1993	La Silla	UESAC	V	3.3 km	MPC; JPL
13993 Clemenssimmer	1993 FN_{9}	Clemenssimmer	March 17, 1993	La Silla	UESAC	·	2.7 km	MPC; JPL
13994 Tuominen	1993 FA_{15}	Tuominen	March 17, 1993	La Silla	UESAC	·	4.8 km	MPC; JPL
13995 Tõravere	1993 FV_{16}	Tõravere	March 19, 1993	La Silla	UESAC	·	4.1 km	MPC; JPL
13996	1993 FH_{20}	—	March 19, 1993	La Silla	UESAC	NYS	3.3 km	MPC; JPL
13997	1993 FB_{32}	—	March 19, 1993	La Silla	UESAC	NYS	6.1 km	MPC; JPL
13998	1993 FL_{39}	—	March 19, 1993	La Silla	UESAC	NYS	3.2 km	MPC; JPL
13999	1993 FH_{43}	—	March 19, 1993	La Silla	UESAC	slow	3.2 km	MPC; JPL
14000	1993 FZ_{55}	—	March 17, 1993	La Silla	UESAC	·	8.8 km	MPC; JPL

back to top

== See also ==
- Meanings of minor-planet names: 13001–14000
