= 13732 Woodall =

Vestian asteroid from the asteroid belt

Discovery
- Discovered by: LINEAR
- Discovery site: Lincoln Lab ETS
- Discovery date: 14 September 1998

Designations
- Named after: Ashley Renee Woodall (DCYSC)
- Alternative designations: 1998 RC_{56} · 1989 EU_{5} 1991 VS_{13} · 1997 LA_{16}
- Minor planet category: main-belt · Vestian

Orbital characteristics
- Epoch 4 September 2017 (JD 2458000.5)
- Uncertainty parameter 0
- Observation arc: 27.75 yr (10,135 days)
- Aphelion: 2.6124 AU
- Perihelion: 2.1366 AU
- Semi-major axis: 2.3745 AU
- Eccentricity: 0.1002
- Orbital period (sidereal): 3.66 yr (1,336 days)
- Mean anomaly: 13.655°
- Mean motion: 0° 16^{m} 9.84^{s} / day
- Inclination: 6.0477°
- Longitude of ascending node: 204.72°
- Argument of perihelion: 217.49°

Physical characteristics
- Dimensions: 3.92 km (calculated)
- Synodic rotation period: 8.2987±0.0005 h
- Geometric albedo: 0.20 (assumed)
- Spectral type: S B–V = 0.864±0.147; V–R = 0.468±0.068
- Absolute magnitude (H): 14.4 · 15.23±0.10

13732 Woodall, provisional designation 1998 RC_{56}, is a stony Vestian asteroid from the inner regions of the asteroid belt, approximately 4 kilometers in diameter. It was discovered on 14 September 1998, by the Lincoln Near-Earth Asteroid Research (LINEAR) team at Lincoln Laboratory's Experimental Test Site in Socorro, New Mexico.

== Orbit and classification ==
Woodall is a member of the Vesta family, which is named after 4 Vesta, the second-largest asteroid in the main-belt. It orbits the Sun in the inner main-belt at a distance of 2.1–2.6 AU once every 3 years and 8 months (1,336 days). Its orbit has an eccentricity of 0.10 and an inclination of 6° with respect to the ecliptic. The first precovery was taken at Siding Spring Observatory in 1989, extending the asteroid's observation arc by 9 years prior to its official discovery observation.

== Physical characteristics ==
Woodall has been characterized as a common S-type asteroid by Pan-STARRS photometric survey.

A rotational lightcurve was obtained based on photometric observations by Czech astronomer Petr Pravec at the Ondřejov Observatory in September 2009. Lightcurve analysis gave a well-defined rotation period of 8.2987 hours with a brightness amplitude of 0.27 in magnitude (U=3).

The Collaborative Asteroid Lightcurve Link assumes a standard albedo for stony asteroids of 0.20 and calculates a diameter of 3.9 kilometers with an absolute magnitude of 14.4.

== Naming ==
This minor planet was named after Ashley Renee Woodall (born 1987) student at the U.S. Austin Academy for Excellence in Garland, Texas. In 2002, she was a finalist of the Discovery Channel Young Scientist Challenge (DCYSC), a science and engineering competition. The approved naming citation was published by the Minor Planet Center on 21 October 2002 (M.P.C. 46767).
