= 13070 Seanconnery =

Background asteroid from the inner regions of the asteroid belt

Discovery
- Discovered by: E. W. Elst
- Discovery site: Haute-Provence Obs.
- Discovery date: 8 September 1991

Designations
- Named after: Sean Connery (Scottish actor)
- Alternative designations: 1991 RO_{2} · 1127 T-1
- Minor planet category: main-belt · (inner) background

Orbital characteristics
- Epoch 4 September 2017 (JD 2458000.5)
- Uncertainty parameter 0
- Observation arc: 46.20 yr (16,873 days)
- Aphelion: 3.1052 AU
- Perihelion: 1.7521 AU
- Semi-major axis: 2.4287 AU
- Eccentricity: 0.2786
- Orbital period (sidereal): 3.78 yr (1,382 days)
- Mean anomaly: 324.53°
- Mean motion: 0° 15^{m} 37.44^{s} / day
- Inclination: 5.6226°
- Longitude of ascending node: 205.71°
- Argument of perihelion: 131.76°

Physical characteristics
- Mean diameter: 1.764±0.130 km 3.57 km (calculated)
- Synodic rotation period: 7.085±0.001 h
- Geometric albedo: 0.20 (assumed); 0.900±0.095
- Spectral type: S (assumed)
- Absolute magnitude (H): 14.5 · 14.6 · 14.7 · 15.12±0.20

13070 Seanconnery, provisional designation 1991 RO_{2}, is a background asteroid from the inner regions of the asteroid belt, approximately 3 kilometers in diameter. It was discovered on 8 September 1991, by Belgian astronomer Eric Elst at Haute-Provence Observatory, St. Michael, in southeast France. The asteroid was named after actor Sean Connery.

== Orbit and classification ==
Seanconnery is a non-family asteroid from the main belt's background population. It orbits the Sun in the inner asteroid belt at a distance of 1.8–3.1 AU once every 3 years and 9 months (1,382 days). Its orbit has an eccentricity of 0.28 and an inclination of 6° with respect to the ecliptic. The asteroid's observation arc begins 20 years prior to its official discovery observation, with its identification 1127 T-1 made during the first Palomar–Leiden Trojan survey in 1971.

== Physical characteristics ==
=== Rotation period ===
In August 2006, a rotational lightcurve of Seanconnery was obtained from photometric observations made at the Hunters Hill Observatory (E14) in Ngunnawal, Australia. The lightcurve gave a well-defined rotation period of 7.085 hours with a brightness amplitude of 0.18 in magnitude (U=3-).

=== Diameter and albedo ===
According to the survey carried out by the NEOWISE mission of NASA's space-based Wide-field Infrared Survey Explorer, Seanconnery has an outstandingly high albedo of 0.90 and a diameter of 1.8 kilometers. The Collaborative Asteroid Lightcurve Link assumes a standard albedo for stony asteroids of 0.20 and calculates a diameter 3.6 kilometers, as the lower the albedo (reflectivity), the larger an asteroid's diameter for a certain absolute magnitude (brightness).

== Naming ==
This minor planet was named for celebrated Scottish actor and Academy Award winner Sean Connery (1930–2020), famous for portraying the character James Bond – after which the minor planet 9007 James Bond is named, starring in seven Bond films between 1962 and 1983. With this minor planet, he is especially honored by the discoverer for his performance as the Franciscan friar William of Baskerville in The Name of the Rose. The official naming citation was published by the Minor Planet Center on 9 March 2001 (M.P.C. 42362).
