= 19383 Rolling Stones =

Asteroid

Discovery
- Discovered by: ODAS
- Discovery site: Caussols–CERGAS
- Discovery date: 29 January 1998

Designations
- Named after: The Rolling Stones (Rock band)
- Alternative designations: 1998 BZ_{32} · 1996 TW_{48}
- Minor planet category: main-belt · (inner); Vesta

Orbital characteristics
- Epoch 27 April 2019 (JD 2458600.5)
- Uncertainty parameter 0
- Observation arc: 63.43 yr (23,167 d)
- Aphelion: 2.6616 AU
- Perihelion: 1.9568 AU
- Semi-major axis: 2.3092 AU
- Eccentricity: 0.1526
- Orbital period (sidereal): 3.51 yr (1,282 d)
- Mean anomaly: 179.00°
- Mean motion: 0° 16^{m} 51.24^{s} / day
- Inclination: 6.7918°
- Longitude of ascending node: 354.77°
- Argument of perihelion: 337.31°

Physical characteristics
- Mean diameter: 2.682±0.147 km
- Geometric albedo: 0.468±0.079
- Spectral type: V (SDSS-MOC)
- Absolute magnitude (H): 14.6

19383 Rolling Stones (provisional designation 1998 BZ_{32}) is a bright Vestian asteroid from the inner regions of the asteroid belt, approximately 2.7 kilometers (1.7 miles) in diameter. The V-type asteroid was discovered on 29 January 1998, by astronomers with the OCA–DLR Asteroid Survey at Caussols in southern France and named for the rock band The Rolling Stones.

== Orbit and classification ==
Rolling Stones is a core member of the Vesta family (401), one of the largest asteroid families in the main belt. Vestian asteroids have a composition akin to cumulate eucrites (HED meteorites) and are thought to have originated deep within 4 Vesta's crust, possibly from the Rheasilvia crater, a large impact crater on its southern hemisphere near the South pole, formed as a result of a subcatastrophic collision. It orbits the Sun in the inner main-belt at a distance of 2.0–2.7 AU once every 3 years and 6 months (1,282 days; semi-major axis of 2.31 AU). Its orbit has an eccentricity of 0.15 and an inclination of 7° with respect to the ecliptic.

The body's observation arc begins with a precovery in September 1954, taken at Palomar Observatory and published by the Digitized Sky Survey, more than 43 years prior to its official discovery observation at Caussols.

== Naming ==
This minor planet was named after the English musical group The Rolling Stones. The official naming citation was published by the Minor Planet Center on 6 August 2003 (M.P.C. 49281). The asteroid's name is unusual in that it is expressed as two words, instead of "Rollingstones" which is the format used by most other minor planets named for individuals or groups (although the asteroid named after Pink Floyd is also expressed as two words).

== Physical characteristics ==
In the SDSS-based taxonomy, Rolling Stones is a bright V-type asteroid.

According to the survey carried out by the NEOWISE mission of NASA's Wide-field Infrared Survey Explorer, Rolling Stones measures 2.68 kilometers in diameter and its surface has a high albedo of 0.47. As of 2018, no rotational lightcurve of this asteroid has been obtained from photometric observations. The body's rotation period, pole and shape remain unknown.
