= 31249 Renéefleming =

Near-Earth asteroid

Discovery
- Discovered by: ODAS
- Discovery site: CERGA Obs.
- Discovery date: 27 February 1998

Designations
- Named after: Renée Fleming (American soprano)
- Alternative designations: 1998 DF_{14} · 1992 FU_{3} 1993 OC_{11}
- Minor planet category: main-belt · (outer); Zhongguo · 2:1 res

Orbital characteristics
- Epoch 23 March 2018 (JD 2458200.5)
- Uncertainty parameter 0
- Observation arc: 23.14 yr (8,453 d)
- Aphelion: 4.1082 AU
- Perihelion: 2.3852 AU
- Semi-major axis: 3.2467 AU
- Eccentricity: 0.2654
- Orbital period (sidereal): 5.85 yr (2,137 d)
- Mean anomaly: 165.56°
- Mean motion: 0° 10^{m} 6.6^{s} / day
- Inclination: 1.5766°
- Longitude of ascending node: 96.933°
- Argument of perihelion: 86.472°

Physical characteristics
- Mean diameter: 6.08 km (calculated); 6.973±0.083 km
- Synodic rotation period: 3.34±0.04 h
- Geometric albedo: 0.053±0.011; 0.057 (assumed)
- Spectral type: C (assumed)
- Absolute magnitude (H): 14.36±0.08 (R); 14.4; 14.6; 14.81; 14.84

31249 Renéefleming (provisional designation 1998 DF_{14}) is a dark Zhongguo asteroid from the outermost region of the asteroid belt, approximately 7 kilometers (4 miles) in diameter. It was discovered on 27 February 1998, by astronomers with the ODAS survey conducted at the CERGA Observatory near Caussols, France. The presumed C-type asteroid has a short rotation period of 3.34 hours. It was named for American soprano Renée Fleming.

== Orbit and classification ==
Renéefleming is a non-family asteroid from the main belt's background population, and a member of the small group of Zhongguo asteroids, located in the Hecuba gap and locked in a 2:1 mean-motion resonance with the gas giant Jupiter. Contrary to the nearby Griqua group, the orbits of the Zhongguos are stable over half a billion years.

It orbits the Sun in the outer main-belt at a distance of 2.4–4.1 AU once every 5 years and 10 months (2,137 days; semi-major axis of 3.25 AU). Its orbit has an eccentricity of 0.27 and an inclination of 2° with respect to the ecliptic. The body's observation arc begins with its first observations at Mount Wilson Observatory in April 1934, almost 64 years prior to its official discovery observation at Caussols.

== Physical characteristics ==
Renéefleming is an assumed C-type asteroid, which agrees with the body's albedo (see below).

=== Rotation period ===
In December 2014, a rotational lightcurve of Renéefleming was obtained from photometric observations in the R-band by astronomers at the Palomar Transient Factory in California. Lightcurve analysis gave a short rotation period of 3.34 hours with a brightness amplitude of 0.12 magnitude (U=2-).

=== Diameter and albedo ===
According to the survey carried out by the NEOWISE mission of NASA's Wide-field Infrared Survey Explorer, Renéefleming measures 6.973 kilometers in diameter and its surface has an albedo of 0.053, while the Collaborative Asteroid Lightcurve Link assumes a standard albedo for a carbonaceous asteroid of 0.057 and calculates a diameter of 6.08 kilometers based on an absolute magnitude of 14.81.

== Numbering and naming ==
This minor planet was numbered by the Minor Planet Center (MPC) on 30 November 2001, after its orbit had sufficiently been secured (M.P.C. 44038). It was named after American soprano Renée Fleming (born 1959) known for her roles in classical operas by Richard Strauss, Mozart, Handel, Verdi and Dvorak, as well as more modern pieces. The official naming citation was published by the MPC on 29 May 2018 (M.P.C. 110615).
