= List of Jupiter trojans (Greek camp) (100001–200000) =

This is a partial list of Jupiter's L_{4} trojans (60° ahead of Jupiter) with numbers 100001–200000. If available, an object's mean diameter is taken from the NEOWISE data release, which the Small-Body Database has also adopted. Mean diameters are rounded to two significant figures if smaller than 100 kilometers. Estimates are in italics and calculated from a magnitude-to-diameter conversion, using an assumed albedo of 0.057.

== 100001–200000 ==
This list contains 264 objects sorted in numerical order.

Designation	Discovery			Orbital description					Diam.	Remarks	Refs
Designation	Date	Observer	Site	a (AU)	e	i (°)	q (AU)	Q (AU)	Diam.	Remarks	Refs
(100475) 1996 TZ_{36}	12 October 1996	Spacewatch	Kitt Peak	5.305	0.041	2.3	5.086	5.524	16 km	–	catalog · MPC · JPL
(100619) 1997 TK_{14}	4 October 1997	Spacewatch	Kitt Peak	5.142	0.081	18.0	4.725	5.559	17 km	–	catalog · MPC · JPL
(100624) 1997 TR_{28}	6 October 1997	Uppsala-DLR Trojan Survey	La Silla	5.209	0.125	4.4	4.558	5.860	16 km	–	catalog · MPC · JPL
(101405) 1998 VJ_{3}	10 November 1998	ODAS	Caussols	5.162	0.072	6.6	4.792	5.533	13 km	–	catalog · MPC · JPL
(101466) 1998 WJ_{15}	21 November 1998	LINEAR	Socorro	5.217	0.080	11.9	4.801	5.633	19 km	–	catalog · MPC · JPL
(101492) 1998 XT_{1}	7 December 1998	ODAS	Caussols	5.169	0.059	21.9	4.865	5.472	21 km	–	catalog · MPC · JPL
(101612) 1999 CS_{8}	13 February 1999	Spacewatch	Kitt Peak	5.173	0.090	26.3	4.707	5.639	20 km	–	catalog · MPC · JPL
(103508) 2000 BV_{1}	27 January 2000	Spacewatch	Kitt Peak	5.316	0.031	3.6	5.151	5.480	15 km	–	catalog · MPC · JPL
(103989) 2000 DC_{94}	28 February 2000	LINEAR	Socorro	5.356	0.073	3.1	4.965	5.746	22 km	–	catalog · MPC · JPL
(107004) 2000 YC_{112}	30 December 2000	LINEAR	Socorro	5.131	0.108	13.7	4.574	5.688	17 km	–	catalog · MPC · JPL
(107134) 2001 AE_{51}	15 January 2001	Spacewatch	Kitt Peak	5.137	0.049	5.6	4.887	5.386	14 km	–	catalog · MPC · JPL
(107178) 2001 BE_{25}	20 January 2001	LINEAR	Socorro	5.173	0.139	22.3	4.455	5.891	20 km	–	catalog · MPC · JPL
(107804) 2001 FV_{58}	26 March 2001	Spacewatch	Kitt Peak	5.295	0.033	6.9	5.121	5.468	18 km	–	catalog · MPC · JPL
111571 Bebevio	11 January 2002	F. Bernardi; M. Tombelli	Campo Imperatore	5.091	0.036	4.6	4.905	5.276	14 km	–	catalog · MPC · JPL
(111736) 2002 CH_{76}	7 February 2002	LINEAR	Socorro	5.104	0.069	7.2	4.752	5.456	12 km	–	catalog · MPC · JPL
(111770) 2002 CY_{152}	11 February 2002	LINEAR	Socorro	5.182	0.021	4.4	5.073	5.291	14 km	–	catalog · MPC · JPL
(111771) 2002 CZ_{152}	11 February 2002	LINEAR	Socorro	5.068	0.069	2.0	4.721	5.416	13 km	–	catalog · MPC · JPL
(111785) 2002 CQ_{186}	10 February 2002	LINEAR	Socorro	5.057	0.060	5.1	4.756	5.359	13 km	–	catalog · MPC · JPL
(111805) 2002 CZ_{256}	4 February 2002	NEAT	Palomar	5.132	0.096	8.6	4.641	5.622	17 km	–	catalog · MPC · JPL
(111806) 2002 CP_{270}	7 February 2002	Spacewatch	Kitt Peak	5.120	0.084	2.6	4.691	5.548	10 km	–	catalog · MPC · JPL
(111819) 2002 DD_{1}	16 February 2002	T. Pauwels	Uccle	5.227	0.075	33.5	4.833	5.621	19 km	–	catalog · MPC · JPL
(111932) 2002 GG_{33}	1 April 2002	NEAT	Palomar	5.135	0.006	10.7	5.105	5.164	15 km	–	catalog · MPC · JPL
(114694) 2003 FC_{99}	30 March 2003	LINEAR	Socorro	5.216	0.170	23.1	4.327	6.104	22 km	–	catalog · MPC · JPL
(114710) 2003 GX_{7}	3 April 2003	LONEOS	Anderson Mesa	5.140	0.058	28.5	4.841	5.439	18 km	–	catalog · MPC · JPL
(116901) 2004 FX_{147}	16 March 2004	Spacewatch	Kitt Peak	5.119	0.014	11.7	5.048	5.190	17 km	–	catalog · MPC · JPL
(116930) 2004 GE_{29}	11 April 2004	CSS	Catalina	5.189	0.011	18.2	5.132	5.246	20 km	–	catalog · MPC · JPL
(116954) 2004 HS_{1}	20 April 2004	W. K. Y. Yeung	Desert Eagle	5.175	0.099	9.8	4.661	5.689	14 km	–	catalog · MPC · JPL
(116969) 2004 HZ_{11}	19 April 2004	LINEAR	Socorro	5.214	0.126	28.2	4.558	5.869	21 km	–	catalog · MPC · JPL
(116970) 2004 HJ_{15}	16 April 2004	Spacewatch	Kitt Peak	5.105	0.024	2.9	4.984	5.225	11 km	–	catalog · MPC · JPL
(117832) 2005 JL_{55}	4 May 2005	Spacewatch	Kitt Peak	5.111	0.068	9.2	4.764	5.458	14 km	–	catalog · MPC · JPL
(117851) 2005 JE_{151}	3 May 2005	CSS	Catalina	5.220	0.043	14.7	4.998	5.443	17 km	–	catalog · MPC · JPL
(127846) 2003 FO_{111}	31 March 2003	LONEOS	Anderson Mesa	5.251	0.048	6.2	4.997	5.504	17 km	–	catalog · MPC · JPL
(128383) 2004 JW_{52}	9 May 2004	Spacewatch	Kitt Peak	5.166	0.030	9.7	5.013	5.319	13 km	–	catalog · MPC · JPL
(129207) 2005 ND_{41}	4 July 2005	MLS	Mount Lemmon	5.315	0.067	3.5	4.961	5.669	17 km	–	catalog · MPC · JPL
(129583) 1997 SV_{14}	28 September 1997	Spacewatch	Kitt Peak	5.155	0.088	4.0	4.701	5.610	15 km	–	catalog · MPC · JPL
(129602) 1997 WA_{12}	22 November 1997	Spacewatch	Kitt Peak	5.291	0.032	16.6	5.124	5.457	16 km	–	catalog · MPC · JPL
(130190) 2000 AG_{90}	5 January 2000	LINEAR	Socorro	5.256	0.046	14.7	5.015	5.496	17 km	–	catalog · MPC · JPL
(134720) 2000 AX_{29}	3 January 2000	LINEAR	Socorro	5.232	0.088	27.6	4.773	5.691	28 km	–	catalog · MPC · JPL
(134749) 2000 BT_{24}	29 January 2000	LINEAR	Socorro	5.282	0.096	20.5	4.776	5.789	26 km	–	catalog · MPC · JPL
(134767) 2000 CS_{113}	11 February 2000	LINEAR	Socorro	5.325	0.045	10.1	5.086	5.563	15 km	–	catalog · MPC · JPL
(134957) 2001 DN_{18}	16 February 2001	LINEAR	Socorro	5.268	0.049	11.0	5.011	5.525	26 km	–	catalog · MPC · JPL
(134965) 2001 DQ_{99}	17 February 2001	NEAT	Haleakala	5.146	0.034	27.5	4.972	5.319	19 km	–	catalog · MPC · JPL
(135540) 2002 CC_{245}	13 February 2002	LINEAR	Socorro	5.127	0.055	12.6	4.845	5.409	12 km	–	catalog · MPC · JPL
(135547) 2002 EN_{14}	6 March 2002	NEAT	Palomar	5.254	0.061	21.7	4.933	5.574	18 km	–	catalog · MPC · JPL
(135593) 2002 GW_{125}	12 April 2002	LINEAR	Socorro	5.207	0.053	3.4	4.930	5.484	12 km	–	catalog · MPC · JPL
(135594) 2002 GK_{147}	13 April 2002	NEAT	Palomar	5.264	0.054	9.7	4.978	5.550	17 km	–	catalog · MPC · JPL
136557 Neleus	25 September 1973	C. J. van Houten; I. van Houten-Groeneveld; T. Gehrels	Palomar	5.217	0.064	10.0	4.885	5.549	16 km	–	catalog · MPC · JPL
(137879) 2000 AJ_{114}	5 January 2000	LINEAR	Socorro	5.272	0.070	12.4	4.902	5.641	23 km	–	catalog · MPC · JPL
(137954) 2000 CK_{13}	2 February 2000	LINEAR	Socorro	5.194	0.044	5.7	4.964	5.424	11 km	–	catalog · MPC · JPL
(138031) 2000 DK_{9}	26 February 2000	Spacewatch	Kitt Peak	5.276	0.037	3.0	5.083	5.470	12 km	–	catalog · MPC · JPL
(138981) 2001 CE_{47}	13 February 2001	Spacewatch	Kitt Peak	5.135	0.066	8.7	4.794	5.476	11 km	–	catalog · MPC · JPL
(139009) 2001 DH_{42}	19 February 2001	LINEAR	Socorro	5.267	0.014	5.5	5.196	5.338	14 km	–	catalog · MPC · JPL
(141523) 2002 EQ_{149}	15 March 2002	NEAT	Palomar	5.139	0.028	2.7	4.997	5.281	14 km	–	catalog · MPC · JPL
(141577) 2002 GS_{149}	14 April 2002	LINEAR	Socorro	5.248	0.047	3.5	5.002	5.494	15 km	–	catalog · MPC · JPL
(141584) 2002 GU_{178}	15 April 2002	NEAT	Palomar	5.154	0.024	3.1	5.031	5.277	16 km	–	catalog · MPC · JPL
(144840) 2004 JX_{35}	13 May 2004	NEAT	Palomar	5.342	0.052	4.3	5.066	5.618	12 km	–	catalog · MPC · JPL
(159378) 1997 TS_{20}	4 October 1997	Spacewatch	Kitt Peak	5.119	0.082	5.6	4.699	5.538	12 km	–	catalog · MPC · JPL
(159633) 2002 CY_{21}	5 February 2002	NEAT	Palomar	5.116	0.041	9.5	4.904	5.328	17 km	–	catalog · MPC · JPL
(159658) 2002 EV_{56}	13 March 2002	LINEAR	Socorro	5.183	0.043	4.6	4.962	5.403	16 km	–	catalog · MPC · JPL
(160135) 2000 YB_{131}	30 December 2000	LINEAR	Socorro	5.160	0.049	17.3	4.908	5.412	22 km	–	catalog · MPC · JPL
(160140) 2001 DZ_{3}	16 February 2001	LINEAR	Socorro	5.213	0.058	24.5	4.910	5.516	19 km	–	catalog · MPC · JPL
(160527) 1996 RE_{31}	13 September 1996	Uppsala-DLR Trojan Survey	La Silla	5.237	0.097	6.7	4.729	5.745	18 km	–	catalog · MPC · JPL
(160528) 1996 RD_{32}	14 September 1996	Uppsala-DLR Trojan Survey	La Silla	5.168	0.094	4.1	4.682	5.654	14 km	–	catalog · MPC · JPL
(160533) 1996 TT_{56}	2 October 1996	E. W. Elst	La Silla	5.243	0.038	7.8	5.042	5.444	18 km	–	catalog · MPC · JPL
(160534) 1996 TA_{58}	2 October 1996	E. W. Elst	La Silla	5.210	0.114	10.6	4.617	5.803	17 km	–	catalog · MPC · JPL
(160661) 1999 XD_{225}	13 December 1999	Spacewatch	Kitt Peak	5.285	0.089	6.3	4.817	5.753	13 km	–	catalog · MPC · JPL
(160679) 2000 DB_{6}	28 February 2000	LINEAR	Socorro	5.220	0.077	12.9	4.821	5.619	20 km	–	catalog · MPC · JPL
(160856) 2001 DU_{92}	19 February 2001	LONEOS	Anderson Mesa	5.233	0.091	7.6	4.755	5.711	16 km	–	catalog · MPC · JPL
(161003) 2002 DA_{2}	19 February 2002	LINEAR	Socorro	5.240	0.035	32.2	5.058	5.422	20 km	–	catalog · MPC · JPL
(161017) 2002 EP_{106}	9 March 2002	LONEOS	Anderson Mesa	5.317	0.037	10.1	5.121	5.514	14 km	–	catalog · MPC · JPL
(161018) 2002 EU_{107}	10 March 2002	NEAT	Haleakala	5.115	0.055	12.0	4.835	5.395	19 km	–	catalog · MPC · JPL
(161020) 2002 EK_{158}	5 March 2002	Sloan Digital Sky Survey	Apache Point	5.164	0.060	1.7	4.855	5.472	11 km	–	catalog · MPC · JPL
(161024) 2002 FM_{7}	23 March 2002	T. Pauwels	Uccle	5.207	0.024	21.1	5.083	5.330	18 km	–	catalog · MPC · JPL
(161027) 2002 FM_{38}	30 March 2002	NEAT	Palomar	5.215	0.084	7.3	4.775	5.655	15 km	–	catalog · MPC · JPL
(161044) 2002 GG_{181}	8 April 2002	NEAT	Palomar	5.213	0.058	11.7	4.910	5.515	14 km	–	catalog · MPC · JPL
(161484) 2004 HU_{42}	20 April 2004	LINEAR	Socorro	5.211	0.024	17.4	5.088	5.334	17 km	–	catalog · MPC · JPL
(161489) 2004 KN_{6}	18 May 2004	LINEAR	Socorro	5.159	0.011	8.2	5.102	5.215	15 km	–	catalog · MPC · JPL
(161701) 2006 JW_{41}	7 May 2006	Spacewatch	Kitt Peak	5.266	0.058	14.9	4.962	5.570	15 km	–	catalog · MPC · JPL
(161717) 2006 PL_{23}	12 August 2006	NEAT	Palomar	5.278	0.033	16.9	5.103	5.454	19 km	–	catalog · MPC · JPL
(162046) 1996 RQ_{31}	13 September 1996	Uppsala-DLR Trojan Survey	La Silla	5.192	0.065	2.9	4.854	5.529	13 km	–	catalog · MPC · JPL
(162047) 1996 RJ_{32}	14 September 1996	Uppsala-DLR Trojan Survey	La Silla	5.175	0.031	6.3	5.016	5.335	13 km	–	catalog · MPC · JPL
(162048) 1996 RO_{32}	14 September 1996	Uppsala-DLR Trojan Survey	La Silla	5.248	0.088	4.0	4.785	5.711	9.9 km	–	catalog · MPC · JPL
(162352) 1999 XS_{226}	14 December 1999	Spacewatch	Kitt Peak	5.223	0.076	2.3	4.828	5.619	12 km	–	catalog · MPC · JPL
(162380) 2000 AW_{225}	12 January 2000	Spacewatch	Kitt Peak	5.263	0.034	2.5	5.084	5.443	13 km	–	catalog · MPC · JPL
(162388) 2000 BK_{39}	27 January 2000	Spacewatch	Kitt Peak	5.242	0.127	4.2	4.577	5.907	13 km	–	catalog · MPC · JPL
(162396) 2000 CV_{120}	5 February 2000	M. W. Buie	Kitt Peak	5.243	0.049	3.1	4.988	5.498	14 km	–	catalog · MPC · JPL
(162805) 2001 AR	2 January 2001	T. Kobayashi	Oizumi	5.199	0.112	25.2	4.618	5.781	19 km	–	catalog · MPC · JPL
(162811) 2001 AG_{51}	15 January 2001	Spacewatch	Kitt Peak	5.144	0.055	3.4	4.862	5.425	14 km	–	catalog · MPC · JPL
(162822) 2001 BD_{49}	21 January 2001	LINEAR	Socorro	5.192	0.070	24.4	4.827	5.558	18 km	–	catalog · MPC · JPL
(162851) 2001 DF_{39}	19 February 2001	LINEAR	Socorro	5.234	0.041	9.7	5.019	5.450	14 km	–	catalog · MPC · JPL
(162861) 2001 DY_{103}	16 February 2001	LONEOS	Anderson Mesa	5.203	0.152	28.7	4.410	5.996	23 km	–	catalog · MPC · JPL
(163102) 2002 AQ_{125}	11 January 2002	LINEAR	Socorro	5.151	0.052	6.3	4.885	5.418	15 km	–	catalog · MPC · JPL
(163135) 2002 CT_{22}	5 February 2002	NEAT	Palomar	5.131	0.035	6.7	4.951	5.312	17 km	–	catalog · MPC · JPL
(163155) 2002 CL_{130}	7 February 2002	LINEAR	Socorro	5.150	0.026	4.4	5.016	5.284	14 km	–	catalog · MPC · JPL
(163189) 2002 EU_{6}	6 March 2002	R. H. McNaught	Siding Spring	5.184	0.095	7.1	4.689	5.679	16 km	–	catalog · MPC · JPL
(163196) 2002 EN_{24}	5 March 2002	Spacewatch	Kitt Peak	5.289	0.025	9.1	5.158	5.420	16 km	–	catalog · MPC · JPL
(163208) 2002 EN_{48}	12 March 2002	NEAT	Palomar	5.260	0.035	2.3	5.076	5.443	12 km	–	catalog · MPC · JPL
(163216) 2002 EN_{68}	13 March 2002	LINEAR	Socorro	5.220	0.038	6.7	5.021	5.419	13 km	–	catalog · MPC · JPL
(163238) 2002 EQ_{151}	15 March 2002	Spacewatch	Kitt Peak	5.319	0.065	9.1	4.971	5.668	17 km	–	catalog · MPC · JPL
(163240) 2002 EM_{157}	13 March 2002	NEAT	Palomar	5.321	0.133	8.8	4.615	6.027	15 km	–	catalog · MPC · JPL
(163245) 2002 FW_{23}	18 March 2002	Spacewatch	Kitt Peak	5.357	0.064	1.9	5.014	5.700	17 km	–	catalog · MPC · JPL
(163256) 2002 GU_{35}	2 April 2002	Spacewatch	Kitt Peak	5.221	0.050	11.5	4.958	5.484	17 km	–	catalog · MPC · JPL
(163263) 2002 GA_{71}	9 April 2002	NEAT	Palomar	5.196	0.058	26.0	4.898	5.495	19 km	–	catalog · MPC · JPL
(163702) 2003 FR_{72}	26 March 2003	NEAT	Palomar	5.288	0.023	19.8	5.168	5.408	15 km	–	catalog · MPC · JPL
(163731) 2003 KD	20 May 2003	M. Schwartz; P. R. Holvorcem	Nogales	5.194	0.023	13.7	5.077	5.311	17 km	–	catalog · MPC · JPL
(164208) 2004 HB_{27}	20 April 2004	LINEAR	Socorro	5.155	0.066	7.3	4.815	5.496	16 km	–	catalog · MPC · JPL
(164210) 2004 JH_{21}	9 May 2004	Spacewatch	Kitt Peak	5.193	0.064	4.0	4.858	5.528	15 km	–	catalog · MPC · JPL
(164212) 2004 JB_{48}	13 May 2004	Spacewatch	Kitt Peak	5.281	0.049	6.0	5.020	5.541	15 km	–	catalog · MPC · JPL
164585 Oenomaos	13 July 2007	P. Kocher	Marly	5.227	0.037	14.0	5.036	5.418	15 km	–	catalog · MPC · JPL
(165531) 2001 CD_{37}	15 February 2001	Tenagra II	Nogales	5.293	0.043	10.2	5.067	5.519	15 km	–	catalog · MPC · JPL
(165551) 2001 DZ_{40}	19 February 2001	LINEAR	Socorro	5.164	0.033	6.2	4.992	5.337	14 km	–	catalog · MPC · JPL
(165569) 2001 DG_{91}	20 February 2001	LINEAR	Socorro	5.141	0.064	5.4	4.810	5.473	11 km	–	catalog · MPC · JPL
(166115) 2002 CO_{208}	10 February 2002	LINEAR	Socorro	5.176	0.122	0.8	4.546	5.807	9.2 km	–	catalog · MPC · JPL
(166123) 2002 CF_{223}	11 February 2002	LINEAR	Socorro	5.152	0.069	4.5	4.797	5.507	14 km	–	catalog · MPC · JPL
(166136) 2002 CN_{296}	10 February 2002	LINEAR	Socorro	5.169	0.029	1.3	5.018	5.320	13 km	–	catalog · MPC · JPL
(166148) 2002 EU_{14}	5 March 2002	Spacewatch	Kitt Peak	5.219	0.079	26.4	4.804	5.634	17 km	–	catalog · MPC · JPL
(166211) 2002 EP_{135}	14 March 2002	LONEOS	Anderson Mesa	5.223	0.008	8.0	5.183	5.263	14 km	–	catalog · MPC · JPL
(166230) 2002 FB_{17}	17 March 2002	Spacewatch	Kitt Peak	5.245	0.097	3.8	4.738	5.751	16 km	–	catalog · MPC · JPL
(166285) 2002 GY_{127}	12 April 2002	LINEAR	Socorro	5.237	0.063	5.1	4.905	5.568	13 km	–	catalog · MPC · JPL
(166351) 2002 KP_{7}	28 May 2002	NEAT	Palomar	5.288	0.051	12.4	5.018	5.558	13 km	–	catalog · MPC · JPL
(167686) 2004 JX_{23}	14 May 2004	CINEOS	Campo Imperatore	5.151	0.030	28.1	4.995	5.307	18 km	–	catalog · MPC · JPL
(168033) 2005 JJ_{143}	15 May 2005	MLS	Mount Lemmon	5.219	0.139	5.7	4.496	5.942	14 km	–	catalog · MPC · JPL
(168280) 2007 QR_{5}	18 August 2007	PMO NEO Survey Program	XuYi	5.289	0.054	1.3	5.003	5.576	13 km	–	catalog · MPC · JPL
(168362) 1996 RV_{28}	11 September 1996	Uppsala-DLR Trojan Survey	La Silla	5.252	0.082	4.9	4.824	5.681	15 km	–	catalog · MPC · JPL
(168364) 1996 TZ_{19}	5 October 1996	Spacewatch	Kitt Peak	5.203	0.039	9.1	5.002	5.405	15 km	–	catalog · MPC · JPL
(171253) 2005 NJ_{12}	4 July 2005	MLS	Mount Lemmon	5.281	0.054	2.3	4.994	5.567	11 km	–	catalog · MPC · JPL
(171424) 2007 NL_{2}	13 July 2007	OAM	La Sagra	5.169	0.018	16.5	5.078	5.261	20 km	–	catalog · MPC · JPL
171433 Prothous	7 September 2007	J. Lacruz	La Canada	5.254	0.055	5.5	4.965	5.544	13 km	–	catalog · MPC · JPL
(172819) 2004 JN_{42}	15 May 2004	LINEAR	Socorro	5.276	0.074	15.2	4.885	5.667	19 km	–	catalog · MPC · JPL
(173084) 2007 PO_{1}	5 August 2007	Črni Vrh	Crni Vrh	5.165	0.050	15.9	4.908	5.422	14 km	–	catalog · MPC · JPL
173086 Nireus	8 September 2007	M. Ory	Vicques	5.141	0.097	17.5	4.641	5.640	16 km	–	catalog · MPC · JPL
173117 Promachus	24 September 1973	C. J. van Houten; I. van Houten-Groeneveld; T. Gehrels	Palomar	5.169	0.122	7.8	4.536	5.801	13 km	–	catalog · MPC · JPL
(175471) 2006 QA_{138}	16 August 2006	NEAT	Palomar	5.210	0.038	4.4	5.010	5.409	13 km	–	catalog · MPC · JPL
(178387) 1997 TN_{30}	11 October 1997	Spacewatch	Kitt Peak	5.219	0.091	0.7	4.743	5.695	15 km	–	catalog · MPC · JPL
(189493) 1999 XL_{257}	7 December 1999	LINEAR	Socorro	5.211	0.090	11.5	4.742	5.680	21 km	–	catalog · MPC · JPL
(189616) 2001 BQ_{17}	19 January 2001	LINEAR	Socorro	5.109	0.096	4.3	4.618	5.600	13 km	–	catalog · MPC · JPL
(189772) 2002 CQ_{78}	7 February 2002	LINEAR	Socorro	5.130	0.024	8.2	5.007	5.252	16 km	–	catalog · MPC · JPL
(189775) 2002 CQ_{130}	7 February 2002	LINEAR	Socorro	5.173	0.040	3.9	4.964	5.382	13 km	–	catalog · MPC · JPL
(189859) 2003 HB_{17}	24 April 2003	LONEOS	Anderson Mesa	5.246	0.045	7.9	5.009	5.484	16 km	–	catalog · MPC · JPL
(190005) 2004 KQ_{17}	19 May 2004	Spacewatch	Kitt Peak	5.228	0.071	18.8	4.858	5.599	14 km	–	catalog · MPC · JPL
(190229) 2006 OO_{5}	19 July 2006	NEAT	Palomar	5.218	0.010	12.2	5.163	5.272	18 km	–	catalog · MPC · JPL
(190264) 2007 NE_{2}	7 July 2007	P. Kocher	Marly	5.258	0.113	13.1	4.665	5.851	15 km	–	catalog · MPC · JPL
(190267) 2007 VL_{6}	3 November 2007	MLS	Mount Lemmon	5.207	0.067	0.5	4.859	5.555	11 km	–	catalog · MPC · JPL
(190268) 2007 XU_{3}	5 December 2007	CSS	Catalina	5.207	0.077	18.6	4.805	5.609	18 km	–	catalog · MPC · JPL
(190294) 1995 QC_{6}	22 August 1995	Spacewatch	Kitt Peak	5.283	0.101	13.4	4.750	5.815	12 km	–	catalog · MPC · JPL
(190301) 1996 RA_{14}	8 September 1996	Spacewatch	Kitt Peak	5.196	0.046	7.5	4.958	5.434	14 km	–	catalog · MPC · JPL
(190309) 1997 SX_{13}	28 September 1997	Spacewatch	Kitt Peak	5.179	0.083	4.6	4.747	5.610	14 km	–	catalog · MPC · JPL
(190311) 1997 TM_{2}	3 October 1997	ODAS	Caussols	5.222	0.091	4.2	4.746	5.698	14 km	–	catalog · MPC · JPL
(190351) 1998 XV_{1}	7 December 1998	ODAS	Caussols	5.118	0.051	6.2	4.858	5.378	11 km	–	catalog · MPC · JPL
(190352) 1998 XC_{23}	11 December 1998	Spacewatch	Kitt Peak	5.229	0.033	6.1	5.054	5.404	15 km	–	catalog · MPC · JPL
(190353) 1998 XK_{99}	15 December 1998	ODAS	Caussols	5.157	0.071	18.7	4.789	5.525	13 km	–	catalog · MPC · JPL
(190442) 1999 XE_{225}	13 December 1999	Spacewatch	Kitt Peak	5.222	0.148	0.8	4.450	5.994	10 km	–	catalog · MPC · JPL
(190446) 2000 AL_{8}	2 January 2000	LINEAR	Socorro	5.172	0.109	7.5	4.606	5.737	18 km	–	catalog · MPC · JPL
(190458) 2000 BG_{40}	29 January 2000	Spacewatch	Kitt Peak	5.293	0.057	4.6	4.991	5.594	16 km	–	catalog · MPC · JPL
(190665) 2000 YG_{98}	30 December 2000	LINEAR	Socorro	5.196	0.164	4.2	4.342	6.049	16 km	–	catalog · MPC · JPL
(190669) 2000 YJ_{117}	30 December 2000	LINEAR	Socorro	5.226	0.039	21.9	5.023	5.428	19 km	–	catalog · MPC · JPL
(190674) 2001 BZ_{18}	19 January 2001	LINEAR	Socorro	5.100	0.084	5.3	4.672	5.527	16 km	–	catalog · MPC · JPL
(190681) 2001 CW_{23}	1 February 2001	LONEOS	Anderson Mesa	5.214	0.072	7.4	4.836	5.592	15 km	–	catalog · MPC · JPL
(190689) 2001 DO_{93}	19 February 2001	LINEAR	Socorro	5.197	0.155	20.1	4.393	6.001	16 km	–	catalog · MPC · JPL
(191028) 2002 AS_{168}	14 January 2002	LINEAR	Socorro	5.115	0.092	20.1	4.645	5.585	17 km	–	catalog · MPC · JPL
(191054) 2002 CZ_{80}	7 February 2002	LINEAR	Socorro	5.171	0.033	3.2	5.001	5.342	17 km	–	catalog · MPC · JPL
(191060) 2002 CT_{111}	7 February 2002	LINEAR	Socorro	5.171	0.066	5.2	4.830	5.511	16 km	–	catalog · MPC · JPL
(191068) 2002 CL_{149}	10 February 2002	LINEAR	Socorro	5.124	0.045	3.7	4.892	5.357	14 km	–	catalog · MPC · JPL
(191075) 2002 CM_{208}	10 February 2002	LINEAR	Socorro	5.199	0.100	31.8	4.679	5.720	17 km	–	catalog · MPC · JPL
(191078) 2002 CE_{216}	10 February 2002	LINEAR	Socorro	5.225	0.062	6.6	4.901	5.549	15 km	–	catalog · MPC · JPL
(191088) 2002 CP_{286}	10 February 2002	LINEAR	Socorro	5.223	0.084	8.2	4.785	5.661	14 km	–	catalog · MPC · JPL
(191089) 2002 CS_{291}	10 February 2002	LINEAR	Socorro	5.168	0.119	11.6	4.551	5.785	17 km	–	catalog · MPC · JPL
(191102) 2002 EW_{14}	5 March 2002	Spacewatch	Kitt Peak	5.197	0.040	2.9	4.992	5.403	15 km	–	catalog · MPC · JPL
(191103) 2002 EF_{42}	12 March 2002	LINEAR	Socorro	5.210	0.065	1.3	4.873	5.546	13 km	–	catalog · MPC · JPL
(191104) 2002 ET_{44}	10 March 2002	NEAT	Haleakala	5.187	0.110	6.6	4.615	5.759	14 km	–	catalog · MPC · JPL
(191107) 2002 ER_{57}	13 March 2002	LINEAR	Socorro	5.121	0.060	5.0	4.813	5.428	15 km	–	catalog · MPC · JPL
(191108) 2002 EX_{58}	13 March 2002	LINEAR	Socorro	5.195	0.079	3.7	4.783	5.606	14 km	–	catalog · MPC · JPL
(191114) 2002 EB_{81}	13 March 2002	NEAT	Palomar	5.273	0.035	9.5	5.087	5.458	18 km	–	catalog · MPC · JPL
(191115) 2002 ES_{83}	9 March 2002	LINEAR	Socorro	5.257	0.124	23.6	4.605	5.909	20 km	–	catalog · MPC · JPL
(191116) 2002 ES_{84}	9 March 2002	LINEAR	Socorro	5.154	0.096	8.1	4.658	5.649	13 km	–	catalog · MPC · JPL
(191291) 2003 FH_{103}	24 March 2003	Spacewatch	Kitt Peak	5.237	0.076	11.7	4.840	5.635	15 km	–	catalog · MPC · JPL
(191303) 2003 GU_{35}	5 April 2003	LONEOS	Anderson Mesa	5.103	0.024	15.0	4.980	5.227	18 km	–	catalog · MPC · JPL
(191912) 2005 JL_{133}	14 May 2005	Spacewatch	Kitt Peak	5.152	0.022	7.0	5.038	5.267	14 km	–	catalog · MPC · JPL
(191913) 2005 LO_{25}	8 June 2005	Spacewatch	Kitt Peak	5.151	0.084	2.7	4.720	5.583	12 km	–	catalog · MPC · JPL
(191914) 2005 MT_{14}	29 June 2005	Spacewatch	Kitt Peak	5.237	0.042	8.1	5.016	5.457	14 km	–	catalog · MPC · JPL
(191915) 2005 MJ_{19}	29 June 2005	NEAT	Palomar	5.116	0.074	20.4	4.739	5.492	19 km	–	catalog · MPC · JPL
(192215) 2007 MH_{19}	21 June 2007	MLS	Mount Lemmon	5.206	0.106	3.0	4.655	5.757	12 km	–	catalog · MPC · JPL
(192217) 2007 PT_{9}	9 August 2007	Chante-Perdrix	Dauban	5.240	0.125	4.4	4.587	5.892	14 km	–	catalog · MPC · JPL
(192218) 2007 PX_{45}	10 August 2007	Spacewatch	Kitt Peak	5.279	0.062	5.2	4.950	5.609	15 km	–	catalog · MPC · JPL
192220 Oicles	14 September 2007	E. Schwab; R. Kling	Taunus	5.222	0.061	12.8	4.901	5.543	11 km	–	catalog · MPC · JPL
(192221) 2007 RQ_{278}	5 September 2007	Siding Spring Survey	Siding Spring	5.194	0.047	27.3	4.951	5.437	21 km	–	catalog · MPC · JPL
(192222) 2007 RZ_{281}	15 September 2007	CSS	Catalina	5.283	0.066	18.6	4.934	5.633	19 km	–	catalog · MPC · JPL
(192223) 2007 VM_{6}	3 November 2007	MLS	Mount Lemmon	5.242	0.079	3.6	4.827	5.657	14 km	–	catalog · MPC · JPL
(192224) 2007 VO_{6}	4 November 2007	MLS	Mount Lemmon	5.203	0.062	15.0	4.882	5.524	11 km	–	catalog · MPC · JPL
(192343) 1995 SU_{14}	18 September 1995	Spacewatch	Kitt Peak	5.305	0.065	2.2	4.963	5.647	12 km	–	catalog · MPC · JPL
(192345) 1995 SG_{24}	19 September 1995	Spacewatch	Kitt Peak	5.313	0.021	2.9	5.201	5.424	12 km	–	catalog · MPC · JPL
(192386) 1996 RE_{14}	8 September 1996	Spacewatch	Kitt Peak	5.249	0.039	6.2	5.046	5.452	11 km	–	catalog · MPC · JPL
(192388) 1996 RD_{29}	11 September 1996	Uppsala-DLR Trojan Survey	La Silla	5.294	0.082	7.2	4.860	5.728	14 km	–	catalog · MPC · JPL
(192389) 1996 RT_{29}	12 September 1996	Uppsala-DLR Trojan Survey	La Silla	5.260	0.011	22.8	5.200	5.320	16 km	–	catalog · MPC · JPL
(192390) 1996 RO_{30}	13 September 1996	Uppsala-DLR Trojan Survey	La Silla	5.201	0.023	9.5	5.082	5.320	14 km	–	catalog · MPC · JPL
(192393) 1996 TT_{22}	6 October 1996	Spacewatch	Kitt Peak	5.323	0.032	4.2	5.154	5.492	11 km	–	catalog · MPC · JPL
(192423) 1997 SM_{26}	28 September 1997	Spacewatch	Kitt Peak	5.210	0.045	8.4	4.976	5.444	11 km	–	catalog · MPC · JPL
(192442) 1997 WJ_{3}	22 November 1997	Spacewatch	Kitt Peak	5.187	0.080	22.0	4.773	5.601	15 km	–	catalog · MPC · JPL
(192448) 1997 WY_{15}	23 November 1997	Spacewatch	Kitt Peak	5.204	0.070	4.1	4.838	5.569	11 km	–	catalog · MPC · JPL
(192929) 2000 AT_{44}	5 January 2000	Spacewatch	Kitt Peak	5.302	0.082	8.7	4.867	5.737	13 km	–	catalog · MPC · JPL
(192938) 2000 AJ_{185}	7 January 2000	LINEAR	Socorro	5.258	0.105	15.9	4.708	5.808	15 km	–	catalog · MPC · JPL
(192942) 2000 AB_{219}	8 January 2000	Spacewatch	Kitt Peak	5.270	0.052	2.5	4.994	5.546	11 km	–	catalog · MPC · JPL
(192964) 2000 CF_{127}	2 February 2000	LINEAR	Socorro	5.285	0.087	23.7	4.824	5.746	15 km	–	catalog · MPC · JPL
(192966) 2000 CS_{140}	6 February 2000	Spacewatch	Kitt Peak	5.362	0.057	5.3	5.059	5.666	12 km	–	catalog · MPC · JPL
(193535) 2000 YS_{109}	30 December 2000	LINEAR	Socorro	5.163	0.079	10.3	4.755	5.572	15 km	–	catalog · MPC · JPL
(193570) 2001 AR_{36}	5 January 2001	LINEAR	Socorro	5.218	0.087	24.8	4.762	5.675	19 km	–	catalog · MPC · JPL
(193592) 2001 BN_{46}	21 January 2001	LINEAR	Socorro	5.158	0.074	11.7	4.774	5.542	15 km	–	catalog · MPC · JPL
(193602) 2001 BL_{70}	21 January 2001	LINEAR	Socorro	5.209	0.101	4.4	4.681	5.737	17 km	–	catalog · MPC · JPL
(193641) 2001 DH_{16}	16 February 2001	LINEAR	Socorro	5.298	0.045	7.3	5.059	5.538	13 km	–	catalog · MPC · JPL
(193670) 2001 DY_{76}	22 February 2001	Spacewatch	Kitt Peak	5.313	0.074	9.5	4.919	5.708	11 km	–	catalog · MPC · JPL
(195041) 2002 CV_{58}	10 February 2002	LINEAR	Socorro	5.175	0.036	9.0	4.992	5.359	12 km	–	catalog · MPC · JPL
(195056) 2002 CN_{80}	7 February 2002	LINEAR	Socorro	5.109	0.009	3.2	5.063	5.154	14 km	–	catalog · MPC · JPL
(195084) 2002 CL_{109}	7 February 2002	LINEAR	Socorro	5.119	0.111	4.4	4.551	5.687	14 km	–	catalog · MPC · JPL
(195104) 2002 CN_{130}	7 February 2002	LINEAR	Socorro	5.153	0.089	31.3	4.696	5.610	19 km	–	catalog · MPC · JPL
(195117) 2002 CT_{143}	9 February 2002	LINEAR	Socorro	5.172	0.120	8.6	4.549	5.794	13 km	–	catalog · MPC · JPL
(195126) 2002 CY_{158}	7 February 2002	LINEAR	Socorro	5.146	0.086	13.5	4.701	5.590	14 km	–	catalog · MPC · JPL
(195152) 2002 CW_{210}	10 February 2002	LINEAR	Socorro	5.133	0.056	9.0	4.845	5.421	14 km	–	catalog · MPC · JPL
(195153) 2002 CG_{213}	10 February 2002	LINEAR	Socorro	5.149	0.073	10.0	4.773	5.525	14 km	–	catalog · MPC · JPL
(195167) 2002 CT_{235}	8 February 2002	LINEAR	Socorro	5.167	0.042	21.4	4.951	5.383	17 km	–	catalog · MPC · JPL
(195188) 2002 CS_{273}	8 February 2002	Spacewatch	Kitt Peak	5.155	0.097	4.7	4.654	5.655	13 km	–	catalog · MPC · JPL
(195217) 2002 DU_{11}	20 February 2002	Spacewatch	Kitt Peak	5.160	0.017	4.6	5.070	5.250	13 km	–	catalog · MPC · JPL
(195218) 2002 DX_{12}	24 February 2002	NEAT	Palomar	5.133	0.052	10.1	4.865	5.402	12 km	–	catalog · MPC · JPL
(195230) 2002 ER_{4}	10 March 2002	Asiago-DLR Asteroid Survey	Cima Ekar	5.262	0.092	7.5	4.777	5.746	15 km	–	catalog · MPC · JPL
(195232) 2002 EB_{8}	12 March 2002	NEAT	Palomar	5.316	0.068	12.6	4.954	5.679	15 km	–	catalog · MPC · JPL
(195245) 2002 EN_{37}	9 March 2002	Spacewatch	Kitt Peak	5.236	0.069	4.1	4.872	5.599	13 km	–	catalog · MPC · JPL
(195258) 2002 EN_{52}	9 March 2002	LINEAR	Socorro	5.246	0.098	0.8	4.730	5.761	11 km	–	catalog · MPC · JPL
(195269) 2002 EZ_{60}	13 March 2002	LINEAR	Socorro	5.261	0.050	5.1	4.997	5.525	15 km	–	catalog · MPC · JPL
(195273) 2002 EW_{63}	13 March 2002	LINEAR	Socorro	5.214	0.068	8.9	4.857	5.571	14 km	–	catalog · MPC · JPL
(195284) 2002 EC_{76}	10 March 2002	Spacewatch	Kitt Peak	5.241	0.037	13.4	5.046	5.436	13 km	–	catalog · MPC · JPL
(195286) 2002 EC_{79}	10 March 2002	NEAT	Haleakala	5.240	0.107	11.5	4.679	5.802	14 km	–	catalog · MPC · JPL
(195287) 2002 EV_{79}	12 March 2002	NEAT	Palomar	5.185	0.045	8.1	4.953	5.418	13 km	–	catalog · MPC · JPL
(195308) 2002 EK_{106}	9 March 2002	LONEOS	Anderson Mesa	5.230	0.034	8.8	5.053	5.407	12 km	–	catalog · MPC · JPL
(195309) 2002 EY_{106}	9 March 2002	LONEOS	Anderson Mesa	5.241	0.009	13.0	5.193	5.289	15 km	–	catalog · MPC · JPL
(195312) 2002 EW_{109}	9 March 2002	Spacewatch	Kitt Peak	5.235	0.037	8.1	5.042	5.427	11 km	–	catalog · MPC · JPL
(195315) 2002 EF_{113}	10 March 2002	Spacewatch	Kitt Peak	5.220	0.010	4.7	5.168	5.272	10 km	–	catalog · MPC · JPL
(195318) 2002 EE_{116}	11 March 2002	NEAT	Palomar	5.211	0.049	14.8	4.957	5.466	14 km	–	catalog · MPC · JPL
(195324) 2002 EO_{123}	12 March 2002	NEAT	Palomar	5.187	0.088	6.4	4.732	5.641	11 km	–	catalog · MPC · JPL
(195337) 2002 EG_{142}	12 March 2002	NEAT	Palomar	5.242	0.081	4.5	4.818	5.666	16 km	–	catalog · MPC · JPL
(195351) 2002 EH_{157}	13 March 2002	NEAT	Palomar	5.219	0.055	5.2	4.934	5.504	10 km	–	catalog · MPC · JPL
(195412) 2002 GF_{39}	4 April 2002	NEAT	Palomar	5.125	0.087	6.1	4.679	5.571	19 km	–	catalog · MPC · JPL
(195415) 2002 GJ_{40}	4 April 2002	NEAT	Palomar	5.343	0.051	8.6	5.069	5.617	17 km	–	catalog · MPC · JPL
(195467) 2002 GT_{114}	11 April 2002	LINEAR	Socorro	5.374	0.045	10.5	5.135	5.614	15 km	–	catalog · MPC · JPL
(195490) 2002 GO_{150}	14 April 2002	LINEAR	Socorro	5.222	0.105	2.0	4.675	5.769	11 km	–	catalog · MPC · JPL
(195495) 2002 GY_{162}	14 April 2002	NEAT	Palomar	5.141	0.112	9.8	4.566	5.717	11 km	–	catalog · MPC · JPL
(195505) 2002 GT_{179}	14 April 2002	NEAT	Palomar	5.202	0.063	4.3	4.874	5.530	11 km	–	catalog · MPC · JPL
(196316) 2003 FZ_{34}	23 March 2003	Spacewatch	Kitt Peak	5.243	0.022	1.9	5.126	5.361	12 km	–	catalog · MPC · JPL
(196318) 2003 FZ_{37}	23 March 2003	Spacewatch	Kitt Peak	5.134	0.036	5.0	4.949	5.320	12 km	–	catalog · MPC · JPL
(196364) 2003 FX_{110}	30 March 2003	Spacewatch	Kitt Peak	5.257	0.051	5.3	4.990	5.525	15 km	–	catalog · MPC · JPL
(196408) 2003 GW_{47}	8 April 2003	LINEAR	Socorro	5.232	0.027	11.2	5.088	5.375	15 km	–	catalog · MPC · JPL
(196440) 2003 HQ_{35}	27 April 2003	LONEOS	Anderson Mesa	5.169	0.020	21.0	5.065	5.273	13 km	–	catalog · MPC · JPL
(196488) 2003 KM_{12}	26 May 2003	Spacewatch	Kitt Peak	5.260	0.025	9.6	5.127	5.393	13 km	–	catalog · MPC · JPL
(197563) 2004 FH_{148}	22 March 2004	LINEAR	Socorro	5.211	0.090	30.3	4.740	5.681	15 km	–	catalog · MPC · JPL
(197586) 2004 HQ_{11}	19 April 2004	LINEAR	Socorro	5.150	0.022	11.7	5.037	5.263	16 km	–	catalog · MPC · JPL
(197593) 2004 HA_{43}	20 April 2004	LINEAR	Socorro	5.265	0.024	22.9	5.138	5.392	18 km	–	catalog · MPC · JPL
(197619) 2004 JC_{37}	13 May 2004	NEAT	Palomar	5.180	0.066	23.3	4.836	5.524	19 km	–	catalog · MPC · JPL
(197620) 2004 JL_{39}	14 May 2004	Spacewatch	Kitt Peak	5.215	0.074	18.1	4.829	5.601	18 km	–	catalog · MPC · JPL
(197624) 2004 JO_{43}	9 May 2004	Spacewatch	Kitt Peak	5.187	0.072	7.7	4.815	5.559	14 km	–	catalog · MPC · JPL
(197628) 2004 KS_{1}	16 May 2004	Spacewatch	Kitt Peak	5.162	0.061	6.8	4.850	5.475	13 km	–	catalog · MPC · JPL
(197630) 2004 KJ_{4}	16 May 2004	Siding Spring Survey	Siding Spring	5.202	0.065	7.3	4.863	5.541	10 km	–	catalog · MPC · JPL
(198858) 2005 LN_{51}	14 June 2005	Spacewatch	Kitt Peak	5.236	0.143	15.7	4.487	5.984	14 km	–	catalog · MPC · JPL
(199791) 2006 MN_{9}	19 June 2006	Spacewatch	Kitt Peak	5.226	0.079	10.6	4.812	5.640	15 km	–	catalog · MPC · JPL
(199792) 2006 PJ_{1}	6 August 2006	C.-S. Lin; Q.-z. Ye	Lulin	5.184	0.040	21.4	4.977	5.391	16 km	–	catalog · MPC · JPL
(199793) 2006 PK_{14}	15 August 2006	NEAT	Palomar	5.226	0.098	7.5	4.713	5.739	15 km	–	catalog · MPC · JPL
(199796) 2006 UN_{217}	28 October 2006	MLS	Mount Lemmon	5.255	0.104	1.5	4.706	5.803	11 km	–	catalog · MPC · JPL

back to top
