= 24988 Alainmilsztajn =

Main-belt asteroid

Discovery
- Discovered by: ODAS
- Discovery site: CERGA
- Discovery date: 19 June 1998

Designations
- Named after: Alain Milsztajn (French particle physicist)
- Alternative designations: 1998 MM_{2} · 2000 AK_{75}
- Minor planet category: main-belt · (inner) background

Orbital characteristics
- Epoch 4 September 2017 (JD 2458000.5)
- Uncertainty parameter 0
- Observation arc: 20.68 yr (7,554 days)
- Aphelion: 2.7472 AU
- Perihelion: 2.0641 AU
- Semi-major axis: 2.4056 AU
- Eccentricity: 0.1420
- Orbital period (sidereal): 3.73 yr (1,363 days)
- Mean anomaly: 277.11°
- Mean motion: 0° 15^{m} 51.12^{s} / day
- Inclination: 4.7168°
- Longitude of ascending node: 203.01°
- Argument of perihelion: 233.57°

Physical characteristics
- Mean diameter: 2.24±0.24 km 2.54 km (calculated)
- Synodic rotation period: 2.8516±0.0008 h
- Geometric albedo: 0.20 (assumed); 0.423±0.093
- Spectral type: S (assumed)
- Absolute magnitude (H): 14.80 · 14.894±0.005 (R) · 15.0 · 15.34 · 15.63±0.45

24988 Alainmilsztajn (provisional designation 1998 MM_{2}) is a background asteroid from the inner regions of the asteroid belt, approximately 2.5 kilometers in diameter. It was discovered on 19 June 1998, by the OCA–DLR Asteroid Survey at CERGA, Caussols, in southeastern France. The asteroid was named after French particle physicist Alain Milsztajn.

== Orbit and classification ==
Alainmilsztajn is a non-family from the main belt's background population. It orbits the Sun in the inner asteroid belt at a distance of 2.1–2.7 AU once every 3 years and 9 months (1,363 days). Its orbit has an eccentricity of 0.14 and an inclination of 5° with respect to the ecliptic.

The asteroid's observation arc begins 3 years prior to its official discovery observation, with a precovery taken by the Steward Observatory's Spacewatch survey at Kitt Peakt in October 1995.

== Physical characteristics ==
=== Diameter and albedo ===
According to the survey carried out by NASA's Wide-field Infrared Survey Explorer with its subsequent NEOWISE mission, Alainmilsztajn measures 2.2 kilometers in diameter and its surface has an exceptionally high albedo of 0.42, while the Collaborative Asteroid Lightcurve Link assumes a standard albedo for stony asteroids of 0.20 and calculates a diameter of 2.5 kilometers with an absolute magnitude of 15.34.

=== Rotation period ===
In October 2010, a rotational lightcurve of Alainmilsztajn was obtained from photometric observations made by astronomers at the Palomar Transient Factory in California. The fragmentary lightcurve gave a rotation period of 2.8516 hours with a brightness amplitude of 0.09 magnitude (U=1).

== Naming ==
This minor planet was named in memory of French particle physicist and astronomer Alain Milsztajn (1955–2007). His research included the structure of the proton and the quest of detecting dark matter by means of gravitational lensing. The approved naming citation was published by the Minor Planet Center on 19 August 2008 (M.P.C. 63641).
