= Côte d'Azur Observatory =

Astronomical observatory network in southern France

Coordinates: 43.72333°N 7.30167°E

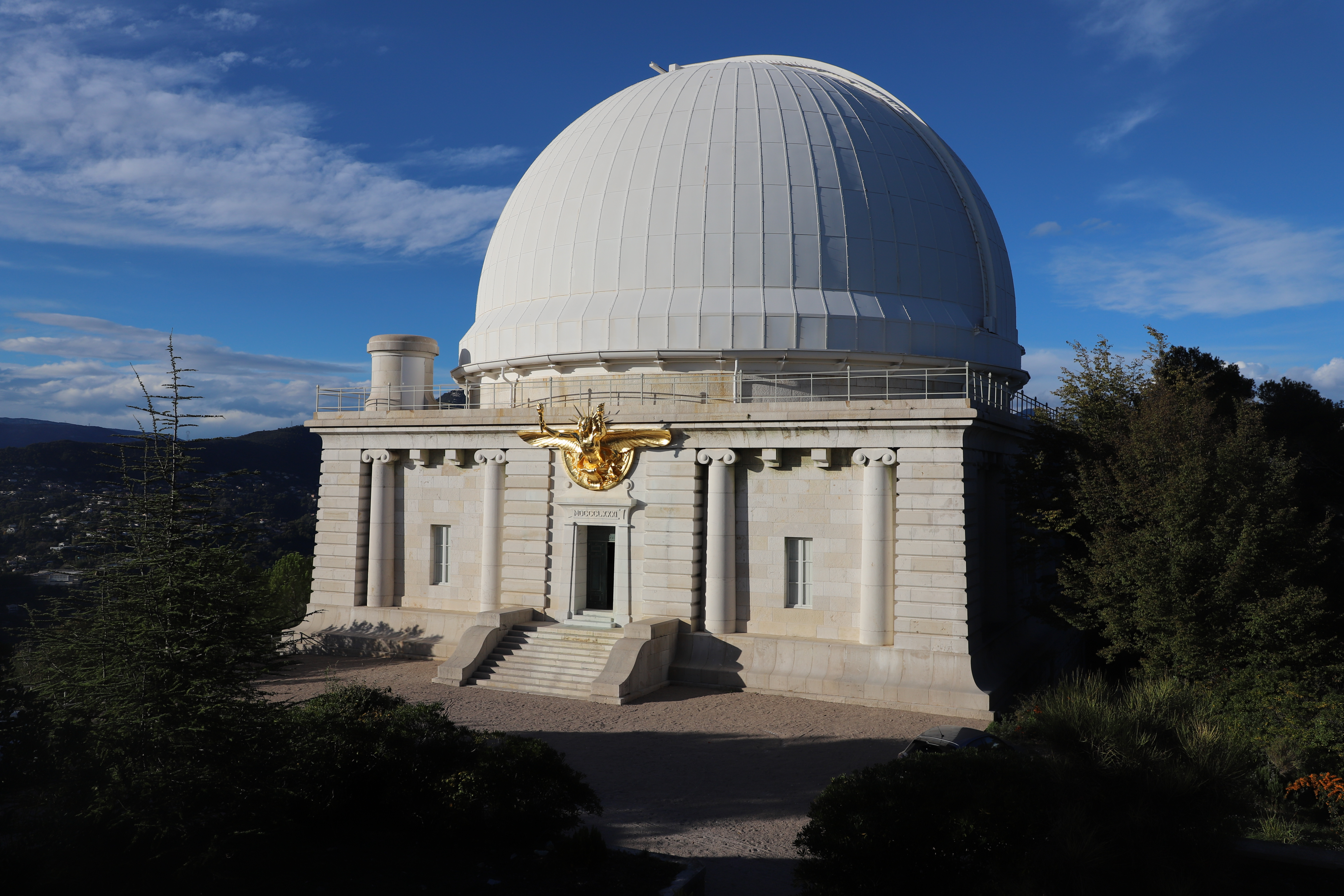
The "Grand Equatorial" of the Côte d'Azur Observatory, atop Mont-Gros (city of Nice).

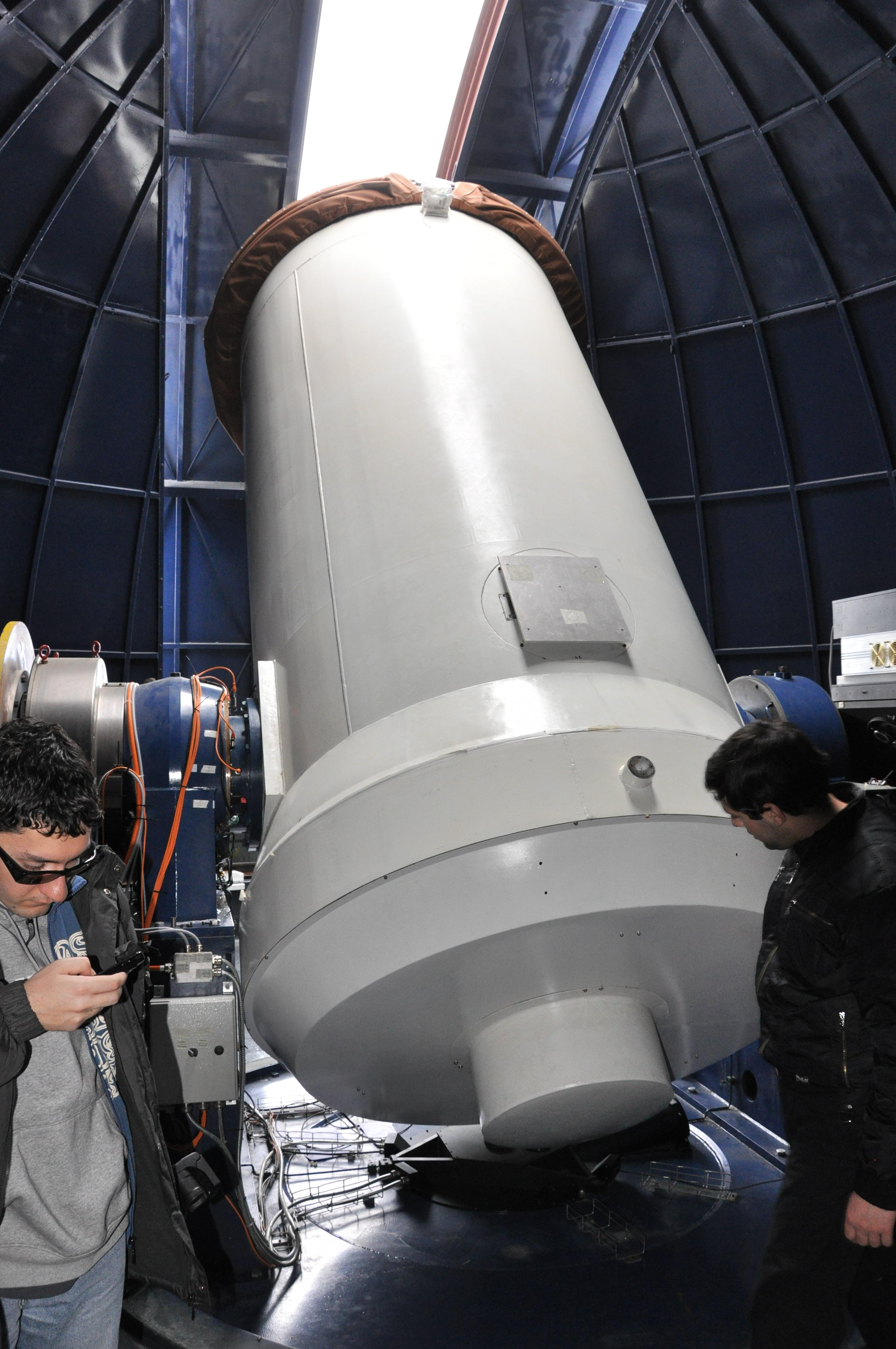
A telescope in the Côte d'Azur Observatory

The Côte d'Azur Observatory (French: Observatoire de la Côte d'Azur, pronounced [ɔpsɛʁvatwaʁ də la kot dazyʁ], OCA) is a network of astronomical observatories throughout southern France (Alpes-Maritimes district). It originated in 1988 with the merger of two observatories:

1. Nice Observatory
2. Centre de recherches en géodynamique et astrométrie (CERGA)

Cote d'Azur Observatory tested beam combining technology at CHARA array.

Astronomers developed a theory about M-Type asteroids, that may be tested by the planned spacecraft Psyche.

== See also ==
- List of astronomical observatories
- Lunar Laser Ranging Experiment
- OCA-DLR Asteroid Survey
- The Nice Model
