= 19367 Pink Floyd =

Main-belt asteroid

Discovery
- Discovered by: ODAS
- Discovery site: CERGA Obs.
- Discovery date: 3 December 1997

Designations
- Named after: Pink Floyd (English rock band)
- Alternative designations: 1997 XW_{3} · 1985 UZ_{2} 1999 JH_{126}
- Minor planet category: main-belt · (inner)

Orbital characteristics background
- Epoch 4 September 2017 (JD 2458000.5)
- Uncertainty parameter 0
- Observation arc: 62.66 yr (22,888 d)
- Aphelion: 2.8466 AU
- Perihelion: 2.0439 AU
- Semi-major axis: 2.4452 AU
- Eccentricity: 0.1641
- Orbital period (sidereal): 3.82 yr (1,397 days)
- Mean anomaly: 114.74°
- Mean motion: 0° 15^{m} 28.08^{s} / day
- Inclination: 3.6853°
- Longitude of ascending node: 91.599°
- Argument of perihelion: 305.17°

Physical characteristics
- Dimensions: 6.652±0.172 km
- Geometric albedo: 0.048±0.013
- Absolute magnitude (H): 14.6

19367 Pink Floyd (provisional designation 1997 XW_{3}) is a dark background asteroid from the inner regions of the asteroid belt, approximately 7 kilometers in diameter. It was discovered on 3 December 1997, by European astronomers of the ODAS survey at the CERGA Observatory near Caussols, France. The asteroid was named after the English rock band Pink Floyd.

== Orbit and classification ==
Pink Floyd is a non-family asteroid from the background population. It orbits the Sun in the inner main-belt at a distance of 2.0–2.8 AU once every 3 years and 10 months (1,397 days). Its orbit has an eccentricity of 0.16 and an inclination of 4° with respect to the ecliptic.

The asteroid was first identified as 1985 UZ_{2} at the discovering Caussols Observatory in October 1985. Its observation arc begins 43 years prior to its official discovery observation, with a precovery taken by the Digitized Sky Survey at Palomar Observatory in July 1954.

== Physical characteristics ==
=== Diameter and albedo ===
According to the survey carried out by the NEOWISE mission of NASA's Wide-field Infrared Survey Explorer, Pink Floyd measures 6.652 kilometers in diameter and its surface has a low albedo of 0.048. An albedo near 0.05 is typical for carbonaceous C-type asteroids, which are the dominant type in the outer region of the main belt, but rather unusual in the inner parts. Pink Floyd has an absolute magnitude of 14.6.

=== Rotation period ===
As of 2017, no rotational lightcurve of Pink Floyd has been obtained from photometric observations. The asteroid's rotation period, spin axis and shape remain unknown.

== Naming ==
This minor planet was named after the English rock band Pink Floyd, which released several astronomically themed songs such as "Interstellar Overdrive" and "Astronomy Domine". The band's album The Dark Side of the Moon (1973) became one of the best-selling records of all time.

The official naming citation was published by the Minor Planet Center on 6 August 2003 (M.P.C. 49281).
