= OCA–DLR Asteroid Survey =

1990s astronomical survey

OCA-DLR Asteroid Survey
- Coordinates: 43°44′56″N 6°55′36″E
- Observatory code: 910
- Website: earn.dlr.de/odas/

Minor planets discovered: 1079
see § List of discovered minor planets

The OCA–DLR Asteroid Survey (ODAS) was an astronomical survey to search for small Solar System bodies focusing on near-Earth objects in the late 1990s. This European scientific project was a collaboration between the French Observatoire de la Côte d'Azur (OCA) and the German Aerospace Center (DLR). The survey is credited for the discovery of one comet and more than 1000 minor planets during 1996–1999.

== Description ==
ODAS operated in cooperation with a global effort regarding near-Earth objects that was begun by the "Working Group on Near-Earth Objects", a component of the International Astronomical Union. The project began October 1996 and ceased observations in April 1999 for a refurbishing. However the telescope has not been reopened since that time. Survey observations were made during the 15 days each month when moon light was at a minimum, during the first and last quarters of the lunar month. The operation used a 90 cm Schmidt telescope of the OCA at Calern, near the city of Nice in southeastern France. A combination of a CCD camera and a software package were used for automated detection of moving objects.

Throughout its tenure, the project observed a total of 10,523 objects, made a total of 44,433 positional measurements, and was responsible for the discovery of more than a thousand asteroids according to the new rules issued by the MPC in October 2010. (The rules redefines who discovered a particular object. Previously, ODAS accounted for a total of 1020 asteroid discoveries). Among the discoveries are also 5 near-Earth asteroids and 8 Mars-crossers (without considering said rule). ODAS also recovered several objects that were previously lost and discovered the comet 198P/ODAS The discovered NEO's were 189011 Ogmios, (452307) 1997 XV_{11} (recovery), 16912 Rhiannon, 1998 SJ2, and 1998 VD31.

== List of discovered minor planets ==
ODAS is credited by the Minor Planet Center (MPC) with the discovery of more than a thousand numbered minor planets during 1996–1999. The published list on ODAS project website may significantly differ from the MPC, as newly numbered bodies have been added, while other bodies are not (anymore) credited to ODAS. For example, the discovery of the two listed asteroids on the ODAS website, (129562) 1997 CJ_{23} and (164798) 1999 JC_{1}, are now officially credited to Spacewatch and CSS, respectively.

| 8952 ODAS | 2 March 1998 | list |
| 9811 Cavadore | 16 September 1998 | list |
| 10210 Nathues | 30 August 1997 | list |
| 10424 Gaillard | 20 January 1999 | list |
| 10425 Landfermann | 20 January 1999 | list |
| 10628 Feuerbacher | 18 January 1998 | list |
| 10891 Fink | 30 August 1997 | list |
| 10907 Savalle | 6 December 1997 | list |
| 10908 Kallestroetzel | 7 December 1997 | list |
| 10943 Brunier | 20 March 1999 | list |
| 11148 Einhardress | 7 December 1997 | list |
| 11158 Cirou | 8 January 1998 | list |
| 11352 Koldewey | 28 November 1997 | list |
| 11353 Guillaume | 5 December 1997 | list |
| 11392 Paulpeeters | 19 November 1998 | list |
| 11401 Pierralba | 15 January 1999 | list |
| 11404 Wittig | 19 January 1999 | list |
| 11669 Pascalscholl | 7 December 1997 | list |
| 11681 Ortner | 1 March 1998 | list |
| 11740 Georgesmith | 22 October 1998 | list |
| 12062 Tilmanspohn | 24 March 1998 | list |
| 12064 Guiraudon | 28 March 1998 | list |
| (12497) 1998 FQ_{14} | 26 March 1998 | list |
| 12498 Dragesco | 26 March 1998 | list |
| 12893 Mommert | 26 August 1998 | list |

| 12916 Eteoneus | 13 October 1998 | list |
| 13217 Alpbach | 30 June 1997 | list |
| 13231 Blondelet | 17 January 1998 | list |
| 13251 Viot | 20 July 1998 | list |
| (13323) 1998 SQ | 16 September 1998 | list |
| (13354) 1998 TO_{15} | 15 October 1998 | list |
| 13674 Bourge | 30 June 1997 | list |
| (13680) 1997 PY | 4 August 1997 | list |
| 13701 Roquebrune | 20 July 1998 | list |
| (13738) 1998 SF_{1} | 16 September 1998 | list |
| 13739 Nancyworden | 16 September 1998 | list |
| (13741) 1998 SH_{10} | 17 September 1998 | list |
| 13793 Laubernasconi | 11 November 1998 | list |
| (13807) 1998 XE_{13} | 15 December 1998 | list |
| 14141 Demeautis | 16 September 1998 | list |
| (14142) 1998 SG_{10} | 17 September 1998 | list |
| 14189 Sèvre | 15 December 1998 | list |
| (14563) 1998 AV_{5} | 8 January 1998 | list |
| 14613 Sanchez | 13 October 1998 | list |
| (14614) 1998 TX_{2} | 13 October 1998 | list |
| 14617 Lasvergnas | 21 October 1998 | list |
| (14651) 1998 YE_{5} | 18 December 1998 | list |
| 14669 Beletic | 16 February 1999 | list |
| (14971) 1997 QN_{3} | 30 August 1997 | list |
| 14972 Olihainaut | 30 August 1997 | list |

| (14979) 1997 TK_{1} | 3 October 1997 | list |
| 15008 Delahodde | 24 August 1998 | list |
| (15016) 1998 SO_{1} | 16 September 1998 | list |
| 15052 Emileschweitzer | 17 December 1998 | list |
| (15380) 1997 QQ_{4} | 30 August 1997 | list |
| 15389 Geflorsch | 2 October 1997 | list |
| (15457) 1998 YN_{6} | 18 December 1998 | list |
| 15467 Aflorsch | 15 January 1999 | list |
| (15474) 1999 BG_{11} | 20 January 1999 | list |
| 15905 Berthier | 27 September 1997 | list |
| (15944) 1998 AH_{5} | 8 January 1998 | list |
| 15945 Raymondavid | 8 January 1998 | list |
| (15958) 1998 BE_{33} | 30 January 1998 | list |
| 15971 Hestroffer | 25 March 1998 | list |
| (15982) 1998 VA_{4} | 11 November 1998 | list |
| 15986 Fienga | 7 December 1998 | list |
| (15987) 1998 XV_{10} | 15 December 1998 | list |
| 16002 Bertin | 15 January 1999 | list |
| 16007 Kaasalainen | 20 January 1999 | list |
| 16804 Bonini | 27 September 1997 | list |
| (16842) 1997 XS_{3} | 3 December 1997 | list |
| (16843) 1997 XX_{3} | 4 December 1997 | list |
| (16844) 1997 XY_{3} | 4 December 1997 | list |
| (16845) 1997 XA_{9} | 7 December 1997 | list |
| (16868) 1998 AK_{8} | 9 January 1998 | list |

| 16887 Blouke | 28 January 1998 | list |
| (16911) 1998 EL_{6} | 1 March 1998 | list |
| 16912 Rhiannon | 2 March 1998 | list |
| 16915 Bredthauer | 24 March 1998 | list |
| (16970) 1998 VV_{2} | 10 November 1998 | list |
| 16984 Veillet | 15 January 1999 | list |
| (16988) 1999 BK_{14} | 23 January 1999 | list |
| 17029 Cuillandre | 17 March 1999 | list |
| (17731) 1998 AD_{10} | 15 January 1998 | list |
| 17744 Jodiefoster | 18 January 1998 | list |
| (17763) 1998 EG | 1 March 1998 | list |
| 17764 Schatzman | 2 March 1998 | list |
| (17767) 1998 EJ_{6} | 1 March 1998 | list |
| 17777 Ornicar | 24 March 1998 | list |
| 17779 Migomueller | 26 March 1998 | list |
| 17869 Descamps | 20 June 1998 | list |
| (17878) 1999 AR_{25} | 15 January 1999 | list |
| 17879 Robutel | 22 January 1999 | list |
| (17887) 1999 DE_{1} | 17 February 1999 | list |
| 17893 Arlot | 17 March 1999 | list |
| (17894) 1999 FP | 17 March 1999 | list |
| (18566) 1997 RS_{3} | 1 September 1997 | list |
| 18568 Thuillot | 3 October 1997 | list |
| 18572 Rocher | 28 November 1997 | list |
| (18573) 1997 WM_{23} | 28 November 1997 | list |

| 18574 Jeansimon | 28 November 1997 | list |
| (18577) 1997 XH | 3 December 1997 | list |
| 18579 Duongtuyenvu | 5 December 1997 | list |
| (18580) 1997 XN_{8} | 7 December 1997 | list |
| 18581 Batllo | 7 December 1997 | list |
| (18604) 1998 BK_{26} | 28 January 1998 | list |
| 18605 Jacqueslaskar | 28 January 1998 | list |
| (18614) 1998 DN_{2} | 20 February 1998 | list |
| 18624 Prévert | 27 February 1998 | list |
| (18625) 1998 DZ_{13} | 27 February 1998 | list |
| 18626 Michaelcarr | 27 February 1998 | list |
| (18633) 1998 EU | 2 March 1998 | list |
| 18634 Champigneulles | 2 March 1998 | list |
| 18635 Frouard | 2 March 1998 | list |
| 18636 Villedepompey | 2 March 1998 | list |
| 18637 Liverdun | 2 March 1998 | list |
| 18638 Nouet | 2 March 1998 | list |
| (18648) 1998 FW_{9} | 24 March 1998 | list |
| 18649 Fabrega | 24 March 1998 | list |
| (18650) 1998 FX_{10} | 24 March 1998 | list |
| 18725 Atacama | 2 May 1998 | list |
| (18743) 1998 YD_{5} | 18 December 1998 | list |
| 18745 San Pedro | 23 January 1999 | list |
| (19363) 1997 OL_{2} | 31 July 1997 | list |
| 19367 Pink Floyd | 3 December 1997 | list |

| (19368) 1997 XZ_{4} | 6 December 1997 | list |
| 19383 Rolling Stones | 29 January 1998 | list |
| (19389) 1998 DD_{14} | 27 February 1998 | list |
| 19395 Barrera | 2 March 1998 | list |
| (19396) 1998 EV_{1} | 2 March 1998 | list |
| 19397 Lagarini | 3 March 1998 | list |
| (19406) 1998 FM_{10} | 24 March 1998 | list |
| 19410 Guisard | 26 March 1998 | list |
| 19456 Pimdouglas | 21 April 1998 | list |
| 19457 Robcastillo | 21 April 1998 | list |
| (19507) 1998 MZ_{13} | 19 June 1998 | list |
| 20228 Jeanmarcmari | 3 December 1997 | list |
| (20229) 1997 XX_{4} | 6 December 1997 | list |
| 20230 Blanchard | 6 December 1997 | list |
| (20241) 1998 DV_{23} | 27 February 1998 | list |
| 20246 Frappa | 1 March 1998 | list |
| (20258) 1998 FF_{10} | 24 March 1998 | list |
| 20259 Alanhoffman | 24 March 1998 | list |
| (20294) 1998 FA_{73} | 27 March 1998 | list |
| 20399 Michaelesser | 20 July 1998 | list |
| (20400) 1998 OB_{4} | 24 July 1998 | list |
| 20405 Barryburke | 24 August 1998 | list |
| (20414) 1998 RH_{16} | 9 September 1998 | list |
| 21369 Gertfinger | 8 July 1997 | list |
| (21379) 1998 DU_{13} | 27 February 1998 | list |

| 21380 Devanssay | 27 February 1998 | list |
| (21381) 1998 EN | 2 March 1998 | list |
| 21531 Billcollin | 20 July 1998 | list |
| (21532) 1998 OY | 20 July 1998 | list |
| 21553 Monchicourt | 26 August 1998 | list |
| (21606) 1999 FH_{6} | 17 March 1999 | list |
| 22512 Cannat | 28 January 1998 | list |
| (22513) 1998 BX_{32} | 29 January 1998 | list |
| 22519 Gerardklein | 2 March 1998 | list |
| (22520) 1998 EL_{2} | 2 March 1998 | list |
| 22521 ZZ Top | 2 March 1998 | list |
| (22643) 1998 OB_{3} | 20 July 1998 | list |
| 22717 Romeuf | 21 September 1998 | list |
| (23713) 1998 EQ_{2} | 2 March 1998 | list |
| 23877 Gourmaud | 16 September 1998 | list |
| (23878) 1998 SN_{2} | 18 September 1998 | list |
| 23882 Fredcourant | 22 September 1998 | list |
| (23885) 1998 SE_{13} | 16 September 1998 | list |
| 23890 Quindou | 22 September 1998 | list |
| (23932) 1998 TN_{2} | 13 October 1998 | list |
| 23937 Delibes | 15 October 1998 | list |
| (23943) 1998 UO_{2} | 20 October 1998 | list |
| 23944 Dusser | 20 October 1998 | list |
| (23945) 1998 US_{4} | 20 October 1998 | list |
| 23946 Marcelleroux | 22 October 1998 | list |

| (23947) 1998 UH_{16} | 23 October 1998 | list |
| (23968) 1998 XA_{13} | 8 December 1998 | list |
| (23970) 1998 YP_{6} | 21 December 1998 | list |
| 24988 Alainmilsztajn | 19 June 1998 | list |
| (24995) 1998 OQ | 20 July 1998 | list |
| 24997 Petergabriel | 23 July 1998 | list |
| (25017) 1998 QG_{6} | 24 August 1998 | list |
| 25018 Valbousquet | 24 August 1998 | list |
| (25054) 1998 QN_{55} | 26 August 1998 | list |
| 25127 Laurentbrunetto | 16 September 1998 | list |
| (25128) 1998 SK_{1} | 16 September 1998 | list |
| 25129 Uranoscope | 16 September 1998 | list |
| (25130) 1998 SV_{1} | 16 September 1998 | list |
| 25131 Katiemelua | 18 September 1998 | list |
| (25235) 1998 UC_{3} | 20 October 1998 | list |
| 25259 Lucarnold | 11 November 1998 | list |
| (25303) 1998 XE_{17} | 8 December 1998 | list |
| 26275 Jefsoulier | 16 September 1998 | list |
| (26311) 1998 TR_{16} | 14 October 1998 | list |
| 27004 Violetaparra | 27 February 1998 | list |
| (27009) 1998 FB_{11} | 25 March 1998 | list |
| 27052 Katebush | 21 September 1998 | list |
| (27077) 1998 TL_{2} | 13 October 1998 | list |
| 27110 Annemaryvonne | 11 November 1998 | list |
| (27129) 1998 XN_{1} | 7 December 1998 | list |

| 27147 Mercedessosa | 17 December 1998 | list |
| (27148) 1998 YT_{2} | 17 December 1998 | list |
| 27178 Quino | 21 January 1999 | list |
| 27949 Jonasz | 8 July 1997 | list |
| (27951) 1997 OG_{2} | 30 July 1997 | list |
| (27964) 1997 SW_{15} | 27 September 1997 | list |
| 27968 Bobylapointe | 3 October 1997 | list |
| (27969) 1997 TT_{3} | 3 October 1997 | list |
| 28078 Mauricehilleman | 26 August 1998 | list |
| (28104) 1998 SL_{1} | 16 September 1998 | list |
| 28105 Santallo | 18 September 1998 | list |
| (28106) 1998 SE_{10} | 16 September 1998 | list |
| 28151 Markknopfler | 22 October 1998 | list |
| (28157) 1998 VY_{3} | 11 November 1998 | list |
| 28248 Barthelemy | 19 January 1999 | list |
| (28249) 1999 BX_{6} | 21 January 1999 | list |
| 28251 Gerbaldi | 20 January 1999 | list |
| (29442) 1997 NS_{4} | 8 July 1997 | list |
| 29446 Gouguenheim | 4 August 1997 | list |
| (29462) 1997 SG_{34} | 29 September 1997 | list |
| 29508 Bottinelli | 7 December 1997 | list |
| (29604) 1998 QX_{5} | 24 August 1998 | list |
| 29614 Sheller | 22 September 1998 | list |
| (29625) 1998 TF_{7} | 14 October 1998 | list |
| 29633 Weatherwax | 10 November 1998 | list |

| (29634) 1998 VB_{3} | 10 November 1998 | list |
| 29696 Distasio | 16 December 1998 | list |
| (29724) 1999 AP_{24} | 15 January 1999 | list |
| 29725 Mikewest | 15 January 1999 | list |
| (29735) 1999 BR_{6} | 21 January 1999 | list |
| 29834 Mariacallas | 17 March 1999 | list |
| (29838) 1999 FA_{7} | 20 March 1999 | list |
| 31104 Annanetrebko | 30 July 1997 | list |
| (31133) 1997 SZ_{15} | 27 September 1997 | list |
| 31174 Rozelot | 6 December 1997 | list |
| 31175 Erikafuchs | 7 December 1997 | list |
| 31201 Michellegrand | 8 January 1998 | list |
| (31241) 1998 DK_{2} | 20 February 1998 | list |
| 31249 Renéefleming | 27 February 1998 | list |
| (31270) 1998 FP_{14} | 26 March 1998 | list |
| 31349 Uria-Monzon | 16 September 1998 | list |
| (31371) 1998 XN_{10} | 15 December 1998 | list |
| (31387) 1998 YA_{2} | 16 December 1998 | list |
| (31388) 1998 YL_{2} | 17 December 1998 | list |
| (31389) 1998 YN_{2} | 17 December 1998 | list |
| (31391) 1998 YA_{5} | 17 December 1998 | list |
| (31395) 1998 YB_{11} | 18 December 1998 | list |
| 31416 Peteworden | 15 January 1999 | list |
| (31426) 1999 BA_{5} | 19 January 1999 | list |
| (31428) 1999 BG_{6} | 20 January 1999 | list |

| 31435 Benhauck | 23 January 1999 | list |
| (31452) 1999 CX_{12} | 14 February 1999 | list |
| (31453) 1999 CY_{12} | 14 February 1999 | list |
| (31562) 1999 FU_{6} | 19 March 1999 | list |
| (33034) 1997 RC_{11} | 3 September 1997 | list |
| (33138) 1998 DQ_{2} | 20 February 1998 | list |
| (33163) 1998 EH | 2 March 1998 | list |
| (33164) 1998 EB_{2} | 2 March 1998 | list |
| (33165) 1998 EO_{2} | 2 March 1998 | list |
| (33177) 1998 FR_{14} | 26 March 1998 | list |
| (33241) 1998 HX_{5} | 21 April 1998 | list |
| (33242) 1998 HR_{6} | 22 April 1998 | list |
| 33330 Barèges | 16 September 1998 | list |
| 33334 Turon | 11 November 1998 | list |
| 33335 Guibert | 11 November 1998 | list |
| 33343 Madorobin | 15 December 1998 | list |
| 33344 Madymesple | 15 December 1998 | list |
| 33345 Nataliedessay | 15 December 1998 | list |
| 33346 Sabinedevieilhe | 15 December 1998 | list |
| (33361) 1999 AU_{25} | 15 January 1999 | list |
| (33363) 1999 BO_{4} | 19 January 1999 | list |
| (33365) 1999 BQ_{6} | 20 January 1999 | list |
| (33369) 1999 BE_{11} | 20 January 1999 | list |
| (33370) 1999 BQ_{11} | 20 January 1999 | list |
| (33371) 1999 BS_{11} | 21 January 1999 | list |

| (33423) 1999 DK | 16 February 1999 | list |
| 33434 Scottmanley | 17 March 1999 | list |
| (33436) 1999 FZ_{6} | 20 March 1999 | list |
| (35391) 1997 XN_{3} | 3 December 1997 | list |
| (35392) 1997 XD_{5} | 6 December 1997 | list |
| (35394) 1997 XD_{9} | 7 December 1997 | list |
| (35418) 1998 AP_{5} | 8 January 1998 | list |
| 35419 Beckysmethurst | 8 January 1998 | list |
| (35420) 1998 AG_{6} | 8 January 1998 | list |
| (35429) 1998 BW_{4} | 18 January 1998 | list |
| (35454) 1998 DE_{14} | 27 February 1998 | list |
| (35462) 1998 DW_{23} | 27 February 1998 | list |
| (35468) 1998 EW_{2} | 2 March 1998 | list |
| (35655) 1998 OJ_{6} | 24 July 1998 | list |
| (35685) 1999 BT_{11} | 21 January 1999 | list |
| (37785) 1997 SL_{15} | 27 September 1997 | list |
| (37812) 1998 AB_{6} | 8 January 1998 | list |
| (37818) 1998 BC_{5} | 18 January 1998 | list |
| (37827) 1998 BR_{32} | 29 January 1998 | list |
| (37848) 1998 DB_{14} | 27 February 1998 | list |
| (37864) 1998 FJ_{10} | 24 March 1998 | list |
| (37865) 1998 FS_{15} | 28 March 1998 | list |
| (37866) 1998 FU_{15} | 28 March 1998 | list |
| (37941) 1998 HS_{6} | 22 April 1998 | list |
| (38022) 1998 MS_{7} | 19 June 1998 | list |

| (38024) 1998 OB | 16 July 1998 | list |
| (38056) 1999 BZ_{10} | 20 January 1999 | list |
| (39792) 1997 RJ_{4} | 5 September 1997 | list |
| (39813) 1997 XV_{4} | 6 December 1997 | list |
| (39814) 1997 XF_{8} | 7 December 1997 | list |
| (39829) 1998 BS_{4} | 17 January 1998 | list |
| (39877) 1998 EQ_{6} | 1 March 1998 | list |
| (39896) 1998 FB_{16} | 29 March 1998 | list |
| (40081) 1998 MG_{14} | 25 June 1998 | list |
| (40083) 1998 MS_{18} | 19 June 1998 | list |
| (40198) 1998 SA_{1} | 16 September 1998 | list |
| (40199) 1998 SE_{1} | 16 September 1998 | list |
| (40201) 1998 SO_{13} | 21 September 1998 | list |
| (40224) 1998 SJ_{143} | 23 September 1998 | list |
| (40233) 1998 UH_{2} | 20 October 1998 | list |
| (42594) 1997 JQ_{1} | 1 May 1997 | list |
| (42611) 1998 EU_{1} | 2 March 1998 | list |
| (42666) 1998 HU_{6} | 22 April 1998 | list |
| (42733) 1998 RH_{2} | 15 September 1998 | list |
| (42788) 1998 XF_{13} | 15 December 1998 | list |
| (42795) 1999 CO_{12} | 14 February 1999 | list |
| (44041) 1998 ER_{1} | 2 March 1998 | list |
| (44052) 1998 FA_{16} | 28 March 1998 | list |
| (44110) 1998 HT_{5} | 21 April 1998 | list |
| (44111) 1998 HN_{6} | 22 April 1998 | list |

| (44194) 1998 MQ_{7} | 19 June 1998 | list |
| (44353) 1998 SB_{1} | 16 September 1998 | list |
| (44360) 1998 SK_{10} | 18 September 1998 | list |
| (44361) 1998 SG_{13} | 21 September 1998 | list |
| (44456) 1998 VP_{4} | 11 November 1998 | list |
| (44469) 1998 VP_{34} | 10 November 1998 | list |
| (44570) 1999 FX_{5} | 16 March 1999 | list |
| (46721) 1997 QW_{3} | 30 August 1997 | list |
| (46748) 1998 DN_{23} | 27 February 1998 | list |
| (46770) 1998 HY_{5} | 21 April 1998 | list |
| (46917) 1998 SA | 16 September 1998 | list |
| (46919) 1998 SN_{3} | 17 September 1998 | list |
| (46991) 1998 TU_{17} | 14 October 1998 | list |
| 47002 Harlingten | 20 October 1998 | list |
| (47016) 1998 VU_{3} | 10 November 1998 | list |
| (47017) 1998 VE_{4} | 11 November 1998 | list |
| (47018) 1998 VT_{4} | 11 November 1998 | list |
| (47039) 1998 WA_{3} | 19 November 1998 | list |
| (47040) 1998 WB_{3} | 19 November 1998 | list |
| (47051) 1998 XZ | 7 December 1998 | list |
| (47052) 1998 XE_{1} | 7 December 1998 | list |
| (47053) 1998 XH_{1} | 7 December 1998 | list |
| (47054) 1998 XX_{1} | 7 December 1998 | list |
| (47058) 1998 XC_{15} | 15 December 1998 | list |
| (47078) 1998 YS_{2} | 17 December 1998 | list |

| (47095) 1999 AQ_{25} | 15 January 1999 | list |
| (48773) 1997 PS | 3 August 1997 | list |
| (48780) 1997 RA_{2} | 4 September 1997 | list |
| (48838) 1998 AF_{10} | 15 January 1998 | list |
| (48840) 1998 BR_{4} | 17 January 1998 | list |
| (48846) 1998 DC_{14} | 27 February 1998 | list |
| (48847) 1998 EW_{6} | 3 March 1998 | list |
| (48886) 1998 JA_{4} | 7 May 1998 | list |
| (48914) 1998 OG_{4} | 27 July 1998 | list |
| (48915) 1998 OJ_{5} | 29 July 1998 | list |
| (49040) 1998 RO | 9 September 1998 | list |
| (49106) 1998 SY | 16 September 1998 | list |
| (49107) 1998 SG_{1} | 16 September 1998 | list |
| (49108) 1998 SQ_{1} | 16 September 1998 | list |
| (49117) 1998 SC_{10} | 16 September 1998 | list |
| (49118) 1998 SL_{10} | 19 September 1998 | list |
| (49119) 1998 SX_{11} | 19 September 1998 | list |
| (49265) 1998 UM_{3} | 20 October 1998 | list |
| (49266) 1998 UW_{5} | 22 October 1998 | list |
| (49294) 1998 VG_{2} | 10 November 1998 | list |
| (49295) 1998 VJ_{2} | 10 November 1998 | list |
| (49296) 1998 VD_{3} | 10 November 1998 | list |
| (49341) 1998 WW_{2} | 17 November 1998 | list |
| (49439) 1998 YC_{5} | 17 December 1998 | list |
| (52595) 1997 RT_{3} | 1 September 1997 | list |

| (52602) 1997 TY_{5} | 2 October 1997 | list |
| (52654) 1998 AK_{5} | 8 January 1998 | list |
| (52655) 1998 AF_{6} | 8 January 1998 | list |
| (52669) 1998 DO_{2} | 20 February 1998 | list |
| (52703) 1998 FW_{72} | 26 March 1998 | list |
| (52798) 1998 QO_{55} | 26 August 1998 | list |
| (52860) 1998 SX | 16 September 1998 | list |
| (52863) 1998 SJ_{13} | 21 September 1998 | list |
| (52873) 1998 SP_{35} | 22 September 1998 | list |
| (52958) 1998 TT_{2} | 13 October 1998 | list |
| (52959) 1998 TY_{2} | 13 October 1998 | list |
| (52960) 1998 TD_{7} | 14 October 1998 | list |
| (52963) 1998 TB_{16} | 15 October 1998 | list |
| (52964) 1998 TE_{16} | 15 October 1998 | list |
| (52965) 1998 TK_{17} | 15 October 1998 | list |
| (52976) 1998 UX_{2} | 20 October 1998 | list |
| (52982) 1998 UY_{15} | 21 October 1998 | list |
| (53004) 1998 VF_{2} | 9 November 1998 | list |
| (53005) 1998 VW_{2} | 10 November 1998 | list |
| (53006) 1998 VD_{4} | 11 November 1998 | list |
| (53055) 1998 XT_{14} | 15 December 1998 | list |
| (53056) 1998 XY_{14} | 15 December 1998 | list |
| (53088) 1998 YF_{5} | 18 December 1998 | list |
| (53118) 1999 AU_{20} | 13 January 1999 | list |
| (53119) 1999 AV_{20} | 13 January 1999 | list |

| (53126) 1999 AO_{24} | 15 January 1999 | list |
| (53127) 1999 AH_{25} | 15 January 1999 | list |
| (53128) 1999 AS_{25} | 15 January 1999 | list |
| (53137) 1999 BL_{4} | 19 January 1999 | list |
| (53138) 1999 BW_{4} | 19 January 1999 | list |
| (53141) 1999 BW_{6} | 21 January 1999 | list |
| (53147) 1999 BB_{14} | 22 January 1999 | list |
| (53258) 1999 FN | 17 March 1999 | list |
| (53262) 1999 FE_{6} | 16 March 1999 | list |
| (55863) 1997 OM_{2} | 31 July 1997 | list |
| (55869) 1997 TB_{2} | 3 October 1997 | list |
| (55891) 1997 XF_{3} | 3 December 1997 | list |
| (55896) 1998 AM_{5} | 8 January 1998 | list |
| (55897) 1998 AH_{6} | 8 January 1998 | list |
| (55898) 1998 AG_{10} | 15 January 1998 | list |
| (55913) 1998 FL_{12} | 26 March 1998 | list |
| (55914) 1998 FV_{14} | 26 March 1998 | list |
| (56011) 1998 UJ_{16} | 23 October 1998 | list |
| (56017) 1998 VC_{4} | 11 November 1998 | list |
| (56018) 1998 VH_{4} | 11 November 1998 | list |
| (56042) 1998 XW_{10} | 15 December 1998 | list |
| (56067) 1998 YH_{2} | 17 December 1998 | list |
| (56068) 1998 YQ_{2} | 17 December 1998 | list |
| (56095) 1999 BL_{6} | 20 January 1999 | list |
| (56169) 1999 FU_{5} | 16 March 1999 | list |

| (56170) 1999 FK_{6} | 17 March 1999 | list |
| (56171) 1999 FR_{6} | 19 March 1999 | list |
| (56172) 1999 FD_{7} | 20 March 1999 | list |
| (58570) 1997 RD_{4} | 3 September 1997 | list |
| (58571) 1997 RB_{5} | 8 September 1997 | list |
| (58593) 1997 TD_{2} | 3 October 1997 | list |
| (58606) 1997 TF_{27} | 4 October 1997 | list |
| (58680) 1998 AO_{5} | 8 January 1998 | list |
| (58683) 1998 AJ_{10} | 15 January 1998 | list |
| (58695) 1998 BJ_{26} | 28 January 1998 | list |
| (58700) 1998 BQ_{42} | 18 January 1998 | list |
| (58701) 1998 BR_{42} | 18 January 1998 | list |
| (58734) 1998 EP | 2 March 1998 | list |
| (58735) 1998 EP_{2} | 2 March 1998 | list |
| (58736) 1998 EO_{6} | 1 March 1998 | list |
| (58749) 1998 FG_{10} | 24 March 1998 | list |
| (58750) 1998 FY_{10} | 25 March 1998 | list |
| (58755) 1998 FS_{14} | 26 March 1998 | list |
| (58756) 1998 FR_{15} | 28 March 1998 | list |
| (58781) 1998 FX_{72} | 26 March 1998 | list |
| (58782) 1998 FY_{72} | 26 March 1998 | list |
| (58821) 1998 HZ_{5} | 21 April 1998 | list |
| (58895) 1998 JS_{3} | 6 May 1998 | list |
| (58937) 1998 QL_{6} | 24 August 1998 | list |
| (58965) 1998 RO_{2} | 15 September 1998 | list |

| (58990) 1998 SA_{2} | 17 September 1998 | list |
| (59045) 1998 TR_{2} | 13 October 1998 | list |
| (59054) 1998 UY_{5} | 22 October 1998 | list |
| (59067) 1998 VS_{1} | 9 November 1998 | list |
| (59068) 1998 VZ_{1} | 9 November 1998 | list |
| (59069) 1998 VX_{3} | 11 November 1998 | list |
| (59121) 1998 XR_{10} | 15 December 1998 | list |
| (59122) 1998 XJ_{15} | 15 December 1998 | list |
| (59155) 1998 XL_{99} | 15 December 1998 | list |
| (59162) 1998 YX_{10} | 18 December 1998 | list |
| (59191) 1999 AS_{24} | 15 January 1999 | list |
| (59199) 1999 BH_{6} | 20 January 1999 | list |
| (59207) 1999 BD_{11} | 20 January 1999 | list |
| (59211) 1999 BS_{13} | 20 January 1999 | list |
| (59212) 1999 BU_{13} | 20 January 1999 | list |
| (59248) 1999 CG_{13} | 14 February 1999 | list |
| (59377) 1999 FF_{1} | 17 March 1999 | list |
| (59381) 1999 FZ_{5} | 16 March 1999 | list |
| (59382) 1999 FP_{6} | 17 March 1999 | list |
| (65864) 1997 OT | 27 July 1997 | list |
| (65905) 1998 EH_{2} | 2 March 1998 | list |
| (65937) 1998 FZ_{72} | 26 March 1998 | list |
| (65964) 1998 HB_{6} | 21 April 1998 | list |
| (66002) 1998 OL_{5} | 29 July 1998 | list |
| (66094) 1998 SY_{1} | 17 September 1998 | list |

| (66097) 1998 SB_{11} | 17 September 1998 | list |
| (66099) 1998 SQ_{13} | 23 September 1998 | list |
| (66144) 1998 SJ_{171} | 18 September 1998 | list |
| (66192) 1998 YW_{10} | 18 December 1998 | list |
| (66197) 1999 BO_{6} | 20 January 1999 | list |
| (66198) 1999 BH_{11} | 20 January 1999 | list |
| (66200) 1999 BT_{13} | 20 January 1999 | list |
| (66238) 1999 FZ | 17 March 1999 | list |
| (69576) 1998 BQ_{46} | 28 January 1998 | list |
| (69587) 1998 EZ_{1} | 2 March 1998 | list |
| (69596) 1998 FT_{14} | 26 March 1998 | list |
| (69597) 1998 FQ_{15} | 28 March 1998 | list |
| (69756) 1998 OY_{3} | 24 July 1998 | list |
| (69796) 1998 RV_{5} | 15 September 1998 | list |
| (69839) 1998 SJ_{10} | 18 September 1998 | list |
| (69841) 1998 SA_{12} | 22 September 1998 | list |
| (69848) 1998 SQ_{35} | 22 September 1998 | list |
| (69948) 1998 VD_{2} | 9 November 1998 | list |
| (69949) 1998 VN_{4} | 11 November 1998 | list |
| (70002) 1998 XY_{9} | 7 December 1998 | list |
| (70004) 1998 XF_{26} | 15 December 1998 | list |
| (73930) 1997 PV | 3 August 1997 | list |
| (73933) 1997 RW_{1} | 3 September 1997 | list |
| (73947) 1997 TV_{3} | 3 October 1997 | list |
| (73965) 1997 XF_{5} | 6 December 1997 | list |

| (73987) 1998 EA_{2} | 2 March 1998 | list |
| (74025) 1998 HA_{6} | 21 April 1998 | list |
| (74053) 1998 JV_{3} | 6 May 1998 | list |
| (74080) 1998 OW | 20 July 1998 | list |
| (74082) 1998 OM_{3} | 23 July 1998 | list |
| (74093) 1998 QU_{6} | 24 August 1998 | list |
| (74167) 1998 RF_{2} | 15 September 1998 | list |
| (74168) 1998 RK_{2} | 15 September 1998 | list |
| (74224) 1998 SX_{1} | 16 September 1998 | list |
| (74227) 1998 SR_{13} | 23 September 1998 | list |
| (74233) 1998 SU_{35} | 24 September 1998 | list |
| (74317) 1998 UZ_{15} | 21 October 1998 | list |
| (74318) 1998 UB_{16} | 22 October 1998 | list |
| (74371) 1998 XG_{1} | 7 December 1998 | list |
| (74372) 1998 XL_{1} | 7 December 1998 | list |
| (74373) 1998 XF_{2} | 7 December 1998 | list |
| (74380) 1998 XR_{13} | 15 December 1998 | list |
| (74421) 1999 AW_{24} | 15 January 1999 | list |
| (74507) 1999 FX | 17 March 1999 | list |
| (79417) 1997 KQ_{1} | 27 May 1997 | list |
| (79435) 1997 TU_{2} | 3 October 1997 | list |
| (79436) 1997 TD_{6} | 2 October 1997 | list |
| (79457) 1997 XD_{6} | 5 December 1997 | list |
| (79485) 1998 FH_{10} | 24 March 1998 | list |
| (79486) 1998 FQ_{10} | 24 March 1998 | list |

| (79643) 1998 SF_{10} | 16 September 1998 | list |
| (79644) 1998 SA_{11} | 17 September 1998 | list |
| (79645) 1998 SM_{11} | 19 September 1998 | list |
| (79754) 1998 TG_{7} | 14 October 1998 | list |
| (79766) 1998 UQ_{4} | 20 October 1998 | list |
| (79767) 1998 UZ_{4} | 22 October 1998 | list |
| (79842) 1998 WG_{42} | 19 November 1998 | list |
| (79848) 1998 XO_{13} | 15 December 1998 | list |
| (79849) 1998 XJ_{14} | 15 December 1998 | list |
| (79850) 1998 XD_{17} | 8 December 1998 | list |
| (79869) 1998 YG_{5} | 18 December 1998 | list |
| (79870) 1998 YO_{6} | 21 December 1998 | list |
| (79893) 1999 BM_{4} | 19 January 1999 | list |
| (79894) 1999 BP_{4} | 19 January 1999 | list |
| (79898) 1999 BD_{6} | 20 January 1999 | list |
| (79899) 1999 BF_{6} | 20 January 1999 | list |
| (79902) 1999 BY_{10} | 20 January 1999 | list |
| (79903) 1999 BX_{11} | 21 January 1999 | list |
| (79989) 1999 FH_{1} | 17 March 1999 | list |
| (85463) 1997 JR_{1} | 1 May 1997 | list |
| (85485) 1997 RJ_{2} | 4 September 1997 | list |
| (85486) 1997 RG_{13} | 6 September 1997 | list |
| (85495) 1997 TT_{5} | 2 October 1997 | list |
| (85496) 1997 TO_{6} | 2 October 1997 | list |
| (85533) 1997 WM_{22} | 28 November 1997 | list |

| (85568) 1998 BN_{14} | 17 January 1998 | list |
| (85639) 1998 OU | 20 July 1998 | list |
| (85641) 1998 OR_{5} | 29 July 1998 | list |
| (85650) 1998 QH_{6} | 24 August 1998 | list |
| (85669) 1998 QK_{55} | 26 August 1998 | list |
| (85766) 1998 TQ_{15} | 15 October 1998 | list |
| (85771) 1998 UR_{4} | 20 October 1998 | list |
| (85780) 1998 VK_{2} | 10 November 1998 | list |
| (85781) 1998 VP_{2} | 10 November 1998 | list |
| (85782) 1998 VZ_{2} | 10 November 1998 | list |
| (85783) 1998 VT_{3} | 10 November 1998 | list |
| (85784) 1998 VV_{3} | 10 November 1998 | list |
| (85794) 1998 VA_{34} | 11 November 1998 | list |
| (85802) 1998 VK_{55} | 10 November 1998 | list |
| (85817) 1998 XB_{1} | 7 December 1998 | list |
| (85821) 1998 XQ_{10} | 15 December 1998 | list |
| (85822) 1998 XC_{17} | 8 December 1998 | list |
| (85836) 1998 YF_{2} | 17 December 1998 | list |
| (85837) 1998 YM_{2} | 17 December 1998 | list |
| (85838) 1998 YU_{2} | 17 December 1998 | list |
| (90920) 1997 QM_{3} | 30 August 1997 | list |
| (90922) 1997 RN_{2} | 4 September 1997 | list |
| (90923) 1997 RV_{3} | 1 September 1997 | list |
| (90924) 1997 RX_{3} | 1 September 1997 | list |
| (90932) 1997 TC_{1} | 3 October 1997 | list |

| (90984) 1997 XF_{6} | 5 December 1997 | list |
| (90985) 1997 XQ_{6} | 5 December 1997 | list |
| (91013) 1998 DG_{2} | 20 February 1998 | list |
| (91018) 1998 DA_{20} | 20 February 1998 | list |
| (91029) 1998 EY | 2 March 1998 | list |
| (91030) 1998 EV_{2} | 2 March 1998 | list |
| (91031) 1998 EX_{2} | 2 March 1998 | list |
| (91039) 1998 FA_{10} | 24 March 1998 | list |
| (91142) 1998 MP_{2} | 20 June 1998 | list |
| (91145) 1998 OX | 20 July 1998 | list |
| (91148) 1998 OY_{2} | 20 July 1998 | list |
| (91172) 1998 RG_{5} | 15 September 1998 | list |
| (91189) 1998 SM_{1} | 16 September 1998 | list |
| (91211) 1998 YJ_{2} | 17 December 1998 | list |
| (91273) 1999 DN | 16 February 1999 | list |
| (96340) 1997 NV_{4} | 8 July 1997 | list |
| (96345) 1997 RF_{5} | 8 September 1997 | list |
| (96371) 1997 XC_{8} | 7 December 1997 | list |
| (96397) 1998 DT_{13} | 27 February 1998 | list |
| (96398) 1998 DX_{13} | 27 February 1998 | list |
| (96405) 1998 ES | 2 March 1998 | list |
| (96418) 1998 FC_{11} | 25 March 1998 | list |
| (96488) 1998 JO_{3} | 6 May 1998 | list |
| (96510) 1998 QL_{55} | 26 August 1998 | list |
| (96537) 1998 SF_{12} | 22 September 1998 | list |

| (96566) 1998 TC_{2} | 12 October 1998 | list |
| (96578) 1998 VT_{2} | 10 November 1998 | list |
| (96585) 1998 WY_{2} | 17 November 1998 | list |
| (96591) 1998 XY | 7 December 1998 | list |
| (96592) 1998 XC_{1} | 7 December 1998 | list |
| (99915) 1997 TR_{6} | 2 October 1997 | list |
| (100594) 1997 OH_{2} | 30 July 1997 | list |
| (100600) 1997 RX_{1} | 4 September 1997 | list |
| (100601) 1997 RF_{4} | 4 September 1997 | list |
| (100615) 1997 TX_{1} | 3 October 1997 | list |
| (100616) 1997 TN_{2} | 3 October 1997 | list |
| (100617) 1997 TQ_{2} | 3 October 1997 | list |
| (100677) 1997 XO_{6} | 5 December 1997 | list |
| (100739) 1998 DA_{14} | 27 February 1998 | list |
| (100760) 1998 FN_{10} | 24 March 1998 | list |
| (100761) 1998 FT_{10} | 24 March 1998 | list |
| (100762) 1998 FX_{14} | 26 March 1998 | list |
| (100828) 1998 HM_{6} | 21 April 1998 | list |
| (100896) 1998 JT_{3} | 6 May 1998 | list |
| (100942) 1998 OQ_{3} | 23 July 1998 | list |
| (100943) 1998 OH_{4} | 27 July 1998 | list |
| (100953) 1998 QB_{6} | 24 August 1998 | list |
| (100954) 1998 QR_{6} | 24 August 1998 | list |
| (101016) 1998 QP_{55} | 26 August 1998 | list |
| (101062) 1998 RF_{5} | 15 September 1998 | list |

| (101165) 1998 SS | 16 September 1998 | list |
| (101166) 1998 ST_{1} | 16 September 1998 | list |
| (101169) 1998 SR_{3} | 18 September 1998 | list |
| (101170) 1998 SU_{3} | 18 September 1998 | list |
| (101171) 1998 SA_{4} | 18 September 1998 | list |
| (101182) 1998 SY_{10} | 17 September 1998 | list |
| (101183) 1998 SR_{11} | 19 September 1998 | list |
| (101335) 1998 SK_{171} | 18 September 1998 | list |
| (101337) 1998 TD_{2} | 12 October 1998 | list |
| (101338) 1998 TM_{2} | 13 October 1998 | list |
| (101339) 1998 TS_{2} | 13 October 1998 | list |
| (101341) 1998 TA_{7} | 12 October 1998 | list |
| (101346) 1998 TY_{15} | 15 October 1998 | list |
| (101347) 1998 TZ_{15} | 15 October 1998 | list |
| (101348) 1998 TG_{17} | 14 October 1998 | list |
| (101355) 1998 TS_{35} | 15 October 1998 | list |
| (101368) 1998 UW_{2} | 20 October 1998 | list |
| (101369) 1998 UY_{3} | 20 October 1998 | list |
| (101370) 1998 UM_{4} | 20 October 1998 | list |
| (101371) 1998 UT_{5} | 22 October 1998 | list |
| (101372) 1998 UD_{6} | 22 October 1998 | list |
| (101379) 1998 UE_{16} | 23 October 1998 | list |
| (101403) 1998 VS_{2} | 10 November 1998 | list |
| (101404) 1998 VY_{2} | 10 November 1998 | list |
| (101405) 1998 VJ_{3} | 10 November 1998 | list |

| (101406) 1998 VL_{3} | 10 November 1998 | list |
| (101407) 1998 VQ_{3} | 10 November 1998 | list |
| (101434) 1998 VU_{33} | 10 November 1998 | list |
| (101453) 1998 WN_{2} | 19 November 1998 | list |
| (101454) 1998 WZ_{2} | 17 November 1998 | list |
| (101488) 1998 WM_{42} | 19 November 1998 | list |
| (101492) 1998 XT_{1} | 7 December 1998 | list |
| (101502) 1998 XZ_{9} | 7 December 1998 | list |
| (101503) 1998 XL_{10} | 8 December 1998 | list |
| (101504) 1998 XK_{13} | 15 December 1998 | list |
| (101576) 1999 BM_{2} | 19 January 1999 | list |
| (101579) 1999 BR_{4} | 19 January 1999 | list |
| (101584) 1999 BP_{10} | 19 January 1999 | list |
| (101585) 1999 BL_{11} | 20 January 1999 | list |
| (101586) 1999 BN_{11} | 20 January 1999 | list |
| (101710) 1999 DQ | 16 February 1999 | list |
| (101739) 1999 FS_{6} | 19 March 1999 | list |
| (101740) 1999 FC_{7} | 20 March 1999 | list |
| (118244) 1997 RV_{10} | 3 September 1997 | list |
| (118246) 1997 SR_{15} | 27 September 1997 | list |
| (118247) 1997 TH_{1} | 3 October 1997 | list |
| (118301) 1998 TO_{16} | 14 October 1998 | list |
| (118313) 1998 WV_{2} | 17 November 1998 | list |
| (118318) 1998 XW | 7 December 1998 | list |
| (118319) 1998 XP_{10} | 15 December 1998 | list |

| (118320) 1998 XB_{11} | 15 December 1998 | list |
| (118334) 1999 AY_{24} | 15 January 1999 | list |
| (120723) 1997 SA_{16} | 27 September 1997 | list |
| (120731) 1997 TY_{2} | 3 October 1997 | list |
| (120732) 1997 TS_{3} | 3 October 1997 | list |
| (120733) 1997 TN_{5} | 2 October 1997 | list |
| (120756) 1997 XN_{7} | 5 December 1997 | list |
| (120776) 1998 DQ_{23} | 28 February 1998 | list |
| (120849) 1998 OJ_{3} | 23 July 1998 | list |
| (120866) 1998 RL_{2} | 15 September 1998 | list |
| (120867) 1998 RM_{2} | 15 September 1998 | list |
| (120870) 1998 RM_{16} | 11 September 1998 | list |
| (120890) 1998 SU | 16 September 1998 | list |
| (120891) 1998 SD_{1} | 16 September 1998 | list |
| (120892) 1998 SO_{3} | 17 September 1998 | list |
| (120894) 1998 SK_{13} | 21 September 1998 | list |
| (120941) 1998 TB_{17} | 14 October 1998 | list |
| (120949) 1998 UU_{3} | 20 October 1998 | list |
| (120960) 1998 VC_{3} | 10 November 1998 | list |
| (120961) 1998 VJ_{4} | 11 November 1998 | list |
| (120979) 1998 XU | 7 December 1998 | list |
| (120998) 1998 YB_{2} | 16 December 1998 | list |
| (120999) 1998 YC_{2} | 17 December 1998 | list |
| (121000) 1998 YG_{2} | 17 December 1998 | list |
| (121018) 1999 BC_{6} | 20 January 1999 | list |

| 121022 Galliano | 20 January 1999 | list |
| (121040) 1999 CP_{13} | 14 February 1999 | list |
| (121080) 1999 FO_{6} | 17 March 1999 | list |
| (129576) 1997 RG_{2} | 4 September 1997 | list |
| (129652) 1998 OA_{4} | 24 July 1998 | list |
| (129721) 1998 VU_{2} | 10 November 1998 | list |
| (129724) 1998 VV_{33} | 11 November 1998 | list |
| (129733) 1998 XM_{13} | 15 December 1998 | list |
| (134464) 1998 TQ_{2} | 13 October 1998 | list |
| (136831) 1997 TA_{1} | 3 October 1997 | list |
| (136832) 1997 TH_{27} | 4 October 1997 | list |
| (136858) 1998 FW_{10} | 24 March 1998 | list |
| (136930) 1998 OT_{3} | 24 July 1998 | list |
| (136935) 1998 QK_{6} | 24 August 1998 | list |
| (136955) 1998 RJ_{5} | 15 September 1998 | list |
| (136980) 1998 SR | 16 September 1998 | list |
| (136981) 1998 SF_{3} | 17 September 1998 | list |
| (136982) 1998 SK_{3} | 17 September 1998 | list |
| (136985) 1998 SD_{12} | 22 September 1998 | list |
| (137021) 1998 TV_{2} | 13 October 1998 | list |
| (137025) 1998 TT_{15} | 15 October 1998 | list |
| (137026) 1998 TX_{16} | 14 October 1998 | list |
| (137027) 1998 TH_{17} | 15 October 1998 | list |
| (137028) 1998 TO_{17} | 15 October 1998 | list |
| (137043) 1998 UL_{49} | 23 October 1998 | list |

| (137054) 1998 VB_{34} | 11 November 1998 | list |
| (137083) 1998 XZ_{13} | 15 December 1998 | list |
| (137098) 1998 YP_{2} | 17 December 1998 | list |
| (137114) 1999 AT_{24} | 15 January 1999 | list |
| (137116) 1999 BL_{2} | 19 January 1999 | list |
| (137118) 1999 BV_{4} | 19 January 1999 | list |
| (137119) 1999 BU_{6} | 21 January 1999 | list |
| (137121) 1999 BJ_{11} | 20 January 1999 | list |
| (137151) 1999 DO | 16 February 1999 | list |
| (145767) 1997 PW | 3 August 1997 | list |
| (145819) 1998 TB_{2} | 12 October 1998 | list |
| (145838) 1998 YF_{11} | 18 December 1998 | list |
| (145846) 1999 CC_{13} | 14 February 1999 | list |
| (145847) 1999 CQ_{13} | 14 February 1999 | list |
| (148062) 1998 UB_{5} | 22 October 1998 | list |
| (148076) 1998 XJ_{1} | 7 December 1998 | list |
| (148077) 1998 XJ_{10} | 8 December 1998 | list |
| (148078) 1998 XS_{10} | 15 December 1998 | list |
| (150159) 1997 JW_{1} | 1 May 1997 | list |
| (150160) 1997 OF_{2} | 30 July 1997 | list |
| (150164) 1997 TP_{5} | 2 October 1997 | list |
| (150180) 1998 FT_{15} | 28 March 1998 | list |
| (150183) 1998 HL_{6} | 21 April 1998 | list |
| (150228) 1998 VN_{3} | 10 November 1998 | list |
| (150232) 1998 XO_{1} | 7 December 1998 | list |

| (150234) 1998 XW_{13} | 15 December 1998 | list |
| (152639) 1997 PT | 3 August 1997 | list |
| (152658) 1997 XG_{6} | 5 December 1997 | list |
| (152672) 1998 HS_{5} | 21 April 1998 | list |
| (152720) 1998 TF_{17} | 14 October 1998 | list |
| (152722) 1998 UG_{3} | 20 October 1998 | list |
| (152732) 1998 VN_{55} | 13 November 1998 | list |
| (155441) 1998 FP_{10} | 24 March 1998 | list |
| (155454) 1998 MU_{18} | 19 June 1998 | list |
| (155479) 1998 TG_{2} | 13 October 1998 | list |
| (155480) 1998 TK_{2} | 13 October 1998 | list |
| (157854) 1998 TN_{15} | 14 October 1998 | list |
| (157859) 1998 UM_{49} | 27 October 1998 | list |
| (157866) 1998 YY_{4} | 17 December 1998 | list |
| (159377) 1997 TO_{1} | 3 October 1997 | list |
| (159379) 1998 AQ_{5} | 8 January 1998 | list |
| (159387) 1998 MT_{18} | 19 June 1998 | list |
| (160544) 1998 HV_{5} | 21 April 1998 | list |
| (160548) 1998 OW_{3} | 24 July 1998 | list |
| (162069) 1997 TC_{3} | 3 October 1997 | list |
| (162070) 1997 TQ_{5} | 2 October 1997 | list |
| (162136) 1998 UD_{5} | 22 October 1998 | list |
| (164681) 1997 KA_{1} | 27 May 1997 | list |
| (164699) 1997 XV_{6} | 5 December 1997 | list |
| (164709) 1998 FC_{10} | 24 March 1998 | list |

| (164727) 1998 RH_{5} | 15 September 1998 | list |
| (164751) 1998 UW_{3} | 20 October 1998 | list |
| (164760) 1998 WX_{2} | 17 November 1998 | list |
| (164764) 1998 XK_{1} | 7 December 1998 | list |
| (164765) 1998 XM_{1} | 7 December 1998 | list |
| (164766) 1998 XQ_{13} | 15 December 1998 | list |
| (168367) 1996 UT_{4} | 18 October 1996 | list |
| (168385) 1997 RH_{4} | 5 September 1997 | list |
| (168388) 1997 TF_{5} | 1 October 1997 | list |
| (168433) 1998 UM_{5} | 22 October 1998 | list |
| (168440) 1998 WT_{2} | 17 November 1998 | list |
| (171508) 1998 MY_{13} | 19 June 1998 | list |
| (173218) 1998 TP_{15} | 15 October 1998 | list |
| (173231) 1998 XX | 7 December 1998 | list |
| (175736) 1998 HJ_{6} | 21 April 1998 | list |
| (175757) 1998 SX_{10} | 16 September 1998 | list |
| (175764) 1998 US_{3} | 20 October 1998 | list |
| (175775) 1999 BW_{10} | 19 January 1999 | list |
| (178408) 1998 RR | 9 September 1998 | list |
| (178432) 1998 TR_{35} | 14 October 1998 | list |
| (178433) 1998 UR_{2} | 20 October 1998 | list |
| (178434) 1998 UU_{4} | 20 October 1998 | list |
| (178437) 1998 VM_{3} | 10 November 1998 | list |
| (181775) 1997 TW_{1} | 3 October 1997 | list |
| (181776) 1997 TM_{6} | 2 October 1997 | list |

| (181799) 1998 OD_{4} | 24 July 1998 | list |
| (181820) 1998 SM_{2} | 18 September 1998 | list |
| (181842) 1998 TF_{16} | 15 October 1998 | list |
| (181846) 1998 UG_{2} | 20 October 1998 | list |
| (181859) 1998 XM_{10} | 8 December 1998 | list |
| (181866) 1999 CU_{12} | 14 February 1999 | list |
| (185701) 1998 FB_{73} | 29 March 1998 | list |
| (185703) 1998 KW | 20 May 1998 | list |
| (185713) 1998 SC_{3} | 17 September 1998 | list |
| (185715) 1998 SJ_{11} | 17 September 1998 | list |
| (185728) 1998 UZ_{3} | 20 October 1998 | list |
| (185735) 1998 XD_{10} | 7 December 1998 | list |
| (187761) 1997 NX_{4} | 8 July 1997 | list |
| 189011 Ogmios | 8 July 1997 | list |
| (189014) 1998 QJ_{55} | 25 August 1998 | list |
| (189427) 1997 TE_{5} | 1 October 1997 | list |
| (189431) 1998 OV_{5} | 29 July 1998 | list |
| (190307) 1997 RA_{13} | 6 September 1997 | list |
| (190311) 1997 TM_{2} | 3 October 1997 | list |
| (190312) 1997 TK_{27} | 3 October 1997 | list |
| (190341) 1998 TS_{15} | 15 October 1998 | list |
| (190351) 1998 XV_{1} | 7 December 1998 | list |
| (190353) 1998 XK_{99} | 15 December 1998 | list |
| (192426) 1997 TJ_{3} | 3 October 1997 | list |
| (192427) 1997 TD_{4} | 3 October 1997 | list |

| (192428) 1997 TZ_{5} | 2 October 1997 | list |
| (192465) 1998 FM_{14} | 26 March 1998 | list |
| (192504) 1998 MC_{14} | 20 June 1998 | list |
| (192516) 1998 RK_{16} | 10 September 1998 | list |
| (192548) 1998 TE_{7} | 14 October 1998 | list |
| (192556) 1998 UP_{5} | 22 October 1998 | list |
| (192589) 1999 BM_{11} | 20 January 1999 | list |
| (192590) 1999 BW_{11} | 21 January 1999 | list |
| (192608) 1999 FH_{60} | 19 March 1999 | list |
| (200142) 1998 BC_{32} | 23 January 1998 | list |
| (200168) 1999 DG | 16 February 1999 | list |
| (202915) 1997 TR_{7} | 2 October 1997 | list |
| (202923) 1998 JM_{3} | 2 May 1998 | list |
| (202924) 1998 OK_{5} | 29 July 1998 | list |
| (202939) 1999 AC_{26} | 15 January 1999 | list |
| (205010) 1997 KN_{1} | 27 May 1997 | list |
| (205028) 1998 EH_{6} | 1 March 1998 | list |
| (205039) 1998 SP_{13} | 21 September 1998 | list |
| (207984) 1997 TG_{6} | 2 October 1997 | list |
| (207990) 1998 ES_{2} | 2 March 1998 | list |
| (210531) 1999 FB_{1} | 17 March 1999 | list |
| (213031) 1997 OB | 25 July 1997 | list |
| (213032) 1997 TX_{3} | 3 October 1997 | list |
| (215112) 1997 XR_{7} | 6 December 1997 | list |
| (215115) 1998 EO | 2 March 1998 | list |

| (216932) 1998 VM_{2} | 10 November 1998 | list |
| (217669) 1998 UH_{6} | 22 October 1998 | list |
| (217675) 1998 WL_{42} | 19 November 1998 | list |
| (219095) 1998 SB | 16 September 1998 | list |
| (219097) 1998 SZ_{3} | 18 September 1998 | list |
| (219123) 1998 TX_{15} | 15 October 1998 | list |
| (219126) 1998 UF_{16} | 23 October 1998 | list |
| (219142) 1998 XP_{14} | 15 December 1998 | list |
| (222011) 1998 RP | 9 September 1998 | list |
| (222033) 1998 TE_{2} | 13 October 1998 | list |
| (222034) 1998 TW_{2} | 13 October 1998 | list |
| (222041) 1998 UZ_{2} | 20 October 1998 | list |
| (222050) 1998 VC_{2} | 9 November 1998 | list |
| (222051) 1998 VW_{3} | 10 November 1998 | list |
| (222054) 1998 WS_{2} | 17 November 1998 | list |
| (225321) 1997 XP_{7} | 6 December 1997 | list |
| (225323) 1998 FY_{9} | 24 March 1998 | list |
| (225339) 1998 SB_{12} | 22 September 1998 | list |
| (225352) 1998 US_{2} | 20 October 1998 | list |
| (225361) 1998 XD_{2} | 7 December 1998 | list |
| (228247) 1998 XH_{10} | 8 December 1998 | list |
| (228248) 1998 XD_{13} | 15 December 1998 | list |
| (229932) 1997 TY_{1} | 3 October 1997 | list |
| (229933) 1997 TG_{27} | 4 October 1997 | list |
| (229954) 1999 BC_{5} | 19 January 1999 | list |

| (231691) 1997 RX_{10} | 3 September 1997 | list |
| (234017) 1998 ON_{3} | 23 July 1998 | list |
| (234037) 1998 VG_{57} | 9 November 1998 | list |
| (234040) 1998 XF_{1} | 7 December 1998 | list |
| (234043) 1999 BS_{4} | 19 January 1999 | list |
| (237414) 1998 UL_{2} | 20 October 1998 | list |
| (239831) 1998 YX_{4} | 17 December 1998 | list |
| (243581) 1997 RH_{6} | 7 September 1997 | list |
| (243607) 1998 WJ_{42} | 19 November 1998 | list |
| (246899) 1997 TB_{5} | 1 October 1997 | list |
| (246904) 1998 FD_{10} | 24 March 1998 | list |
| (246910) 1998 QZ_{5} | 24 August 1998 | list |
| (246915) 1998 UK_{5} | 22 October 1998 | list |
| (246916) 1998 UZ_{5} | 22 October 1998 | list |
| (246926) 1999 BO_{11} | 20 January 1999 | list |
| (249596) 1997 RG_{5} | 8 September 1997 | list |
| (251748) 1998 XC_{11} | 15 December 1998 | list |
| (251761) 1999 FN_{6} | 17 March 1999 | list |
| (257558) 1998 TM_{16} | 12 October 1998 | list |
| (257563) 1998 UA_{2} | 19 October 1998 | list |
| (264297) 1998 VK_{34} | 10 November 1998 | list |
| (266953) 2010 UC_{27} | 25 October 1997 | list |
| (267034) 1997 AC_{25} | 12 January 1997 | list |
| (267050) 1998 SG_{3} | 17 September 1998 | list |
| (267060) 1998 WH_{42} | 19 November 1998 | list |

| (267061) 1998 WD_{44} | 19 November 1998 | list |
| (269635) 2011 AS_{45} | 19 September 1998 | list |
| (269727) 1998 SL_{3} | 17 September 1998 | list |
| (275546) 1998 UP_{2} | 20 October 1998 | list |
| (275550) 1999 CV_{12} | 14 February 1999 | list |
| (279544) 2011 CV_{23} | 19 June 1998 | list |
| (279640) 2011 EC_{73} | 15 October 1998 | list |
| (279741) 1998 FL_{10} | 24 March 1998 | list |
| (279756) 1998 WE_{42} | 19 November 1998 | list |
| (282045) 1998 VL_{55} | 10 November 1998 | list |
| (283330) 1998 FL_{14} | 26 March 1998 | list |
| (285235) 1997 TB_{7} | 2 October 1997 | list |
| (285300) 1998 TT_{16} | 14 October 1998 | list |
| (285304) 1998 VR_{3} | 10 November 1998 | list |
| (285312) 1998 XQ_{15} | 15 December 1998 | list |
| (297288) 1997 TT_{1} | 3 October 1997 | list |
| (297311) 1998 VR_{4} | 11 November 1998 | list |
| (297313) 1998 WF_{42} | 19 November 1998 | list |
| (300401) 2007 RM_{259} | 1 August 1998 | list |
| (301897) 1998 SE_{12} | 22 September 1998 | list |
| (301908) 1998 XM_{14} | 15 December 1998 | list |
| (301909) 1998 XK_{15} | 15 December 1998 | list |
| (306437) 1998 TV_{17} | 14 October 1998 | list |
| (306439) 1998 UG_{5} | 22 October 1998 | list |
| (306448) 1998 XT | 7 December 1998 | list |

| (310182) 2011 SL_{65} | 2 October 1997 | list |
| (310343) 2011 UU_{216} | 24 June 1997 | list |
| (310362) 2011 UE_{288} | 13 November 1998 | list |
| (310395) 1998 TM_{15} | 14 October 1998 | list |
| (312973) 1999 BX_{10} | 19 January 1999 | list |
| (316133) 2009 SX_{33} | 25 October 1997 | list |
| (316266) 2010 PE_{22} | 26 July 1998 | list |
| (316606) 2011 VZ_{18} | 15 December 1998 | list |
| (316718) 1997 XM_{3} | 3 December 1997 | list |
| (317420) 2002 PG_{197} | 1 August 1998 | list |
| (321957) 2010 UM_{12} | 2 October 1997 | list |
| (321962) 2010 UK_{16} | 6 July 1997 | list |
| (321998) 2010 UX_{77} | 6 September 1997 | list |
| (322086) 2010 VM_{123} | 17 October 1996 | list |
| (322251) 2011 CN_{88} | 25 August 1998 | list |
| (322644) 1998 UV_{3} | 20 October 1998 | list |
| (326165) 2012 BH_{99} | 20 February 1998 | list |
| (326307) 1998 XE_{10} | 8 December 1998 | list |
| (329255) 1997 TN_{1} | 3 October 1997 | list |
| (331413) 2012 FN_{59} | 31 January 1998 | list |
| (333826) 2012 HF_{78} | 3 October 1997 | list |
| (337063) 1997 TQ_{3} | 3 October 1997 | list |
| (337094) 1998 VL_{34} | 10 November 1998 | list |
| (337098) 1998 XB_{10} | 7 December 1998 | list |
| (337099) 1999 DH | 16 February 1999 | list |

| (338758) 2003 UK_{197} | 25 August 1998 | list |
| (343387) 2010 CA_{149} | 22 October 1998 | list |
| (350091) 2011 LC_{14} | 7 July 1997 | list |
| (350096) 2011 NT_{1} | 5 March 1998 | list |
| (350370) 2012 UG_{152} | 22 October 1998 | list |
| (350388) 2012 VT_{10} | 3 October 1997 | list |
| (354437) 2003 YW_{36} | 15 December 1998 | list |
| (356614) 2011 US_{12} | 20 March 1999 | list |
| (356958) 2012 XA_{25} | 28 September 1998 | list |
| (360208) 1998 VL_{2} | 10 November 1998 | list |
| (362263) 2009 OZ_{10} | 29 July 1998 | list |
| (362886) 2012 BG_{110} | 26 July 1997 | list |
| (363023) 1997 RR_{2} | 1 September 1997 | list |
| (363025) 1998 SB_{4} | 18 September 1998 | list |
| (363031) 1998 XX_{13} | 15 December 1998 | list |
| (364313) 2006 UB_{54} | 15 December 1998 | list |
| (366112) 2012 DP_{26} | 1 March 1998 | list |
| (366167) 2012 FH_{68} | 17 September 1998 | list |
| (366574) 2002 TT_{26} | 24 August 1998 | list |
| (367745) 2010 VQ_{61} | 4 September 1997 | list |
| (368156) 1998 OL_{3} | 23 July 1998 | list |
| (369764) 2012 FK_{77} | 17 January 1998 | list |
| (373410) 1997 RL_{12} | 6 September 1997 | list |
| (373421) 1998 XF_{17} | 15 December 1998 | list |
| (375059) 2007 PM_{46} | 16 February 1999 | list |

| (376132) 2011 AN_{63} | 19 September 1998 | list |
| (376624) 2013 PB_{50} | 30 September 1997 | list |
| (376726) 1998 JZ_{3} | 7 May 1998 | list |
| (378961) 2008 UH_{204} | 25 August 1998 | list |
| (380107) 2013 TD_{30} | 2 May 1997 | list |
| (382424) 1998 VS_{3} | 10 November 1998 | list |
| (384330) 2009 SD_{330} | 11 November 1998 | list |
| (385127) 2013 BL_{60} | 6 February 1997 | list |
| (387252) 2012 UY_{87} | 14 October 1998 | list |
| (389589) 2011 FG_{129} | 2 October 1997 | list |
| (389949) 2012 TA_{167} | 2 October 1997 | list |
| (390138) 2012 VQ_{74} | 19 September 1998 | list |
| (390354) 2013 CS_{178} | 3 October 1997 | list |
| (390356) 2013 CW_{194} | 6 February 1997 | list |
| (390533) 1998 RG_{2} | 15 September 1998 | list |
| (391598) 2007 UX_{26} | 17 September 1998 | list |
| (392404) 2010 LW_{34} | 2 May 1997 | list |
| (392687) 2011 VY_{22} | 17 July 1998 | list |
| (393358) 1997 TT_{2} | 3 October 1997 | list |
| (393499) 2002 QD_{153} | 22 October 1998 | list |
| (394471) 2007 TF_{10} | 19 September 1998 | list |
| (396548) 1997 RJ_{12} | 6 September 1997 | list |
| (397767) 2008 GF_{77} | 25 August 1998 | list |
| (399011) 2013 GF_{19} | 26 July 1998 | list |
| (401128) 2011 US_{306} | 2 October 1997 | list |

| (401252) 2012 BB_{78} | 7 September 1997 | list |
| (401827) 1998 SH_{13} | 21 September 1998 | list |
| (402438) 2006 AK_{101} | 22 October 1998 | list |
| (404093) 2012 FK_{22} | 3 September 1997 | list |
| (404509) 2013 HF_{48} | 25 October 1997 | list |
| (405137) 2002 PE_{202} | 25 August 1998 | list |
| (407577) 2011 AT_{20} | 25 August 1998 | list |
| (408761) 1997 TV_{2} | 3 October 1997 | list |
| (408772) 1998 WU_{2} | 17 November 1998 | list |
| (410271) 2007 TZ_{151} | 2 October 1997 | list |
| (411213) 2010 NU_{25} | 1 August 1997 | list |
| (411770) 2012 BE_{134} | 5 December 1997 | list |
| (412376) 2013 OP_{10} | 3 October 1997 | list |
| (414881) 2010 VY_{218} | 6 December 1997 | list |
| (421419) 2013 WL_{54} | 2 October 1997 | list |
| (421457) 2014 NV_{21} | 19 October 1998 | list |
| (422310) 2014 SJ_{164} | 2 October 1997 | list |
| (422371) 2014 SC_{251} | 1 August 1998 | list |
| (422393) 2014 SJ_{278} | 10 September 1998 | list |
| (427188) 2014 VB_{14} | 18 September 1998 | list |
| (427400) 1997 WH_{56} | 31 October 1997 | list |
| (430384) 2014 UO_{108} | 5 December 1997 | list |
| (435373) 2007 VV_{327} | 27 January 1998 | list |
| (436797) 2012 QG_{16} | 6 July 1997 | list |
| (437071) 2012 UU_{55} | 6 July 1997 | list |

| (437581) 2014 AQ_{41} | 25 August 1998 | list |
| (437713) 2014 DL_{94} | 25 August 1998 | list |
| (442258) 2011 PH_{8} | 25 August 1998 | list |
| (442321) 2011 SA_{129} | 17 July 1998 | list |
| (442338) 2011 SK_{179} | 2 October 1997 | list |
| (442353) 2011 SF_{229} | 14 October 1998 | list |
| (443802) 1997 RH_{13} | 6 September 1997 | list |
| (445688) 2011 UD_{151} | 22 September 1998 | list |
| (446210) 2013 GF_{31} | 14 October 1998 | list |
| (446793) 1998 UF_{2} | 20 October 1998 | list |
| (448967) 2011 WY_{133} | 11 September 1998 | list |
| (449008) 2012 BG_{81} | 25 August 1998 | list |
| (449478) 2014 DW_{96} | 2 May 1997 | list |
| (449653) 2014 KU_{55} | 19 October 1998 | list |
| (449984) 2015 PN_{116} | 24 August 1998 | list |
| (450049) 2015 RX_{26} | 1 August 1997 | list |
| (451767) 2013 FP_{26} | 15 December 1998 | list |
| 452307 Manawydan | 5 December 1997 | list |
| (454423) 2014 NH_{62} | 15 December 1998 | list |
| (454889) 2015 TU_{79} | 14 October 1998 | list |
| (454908) 2015 TA_{130} | 29 July 1998 | list |
| (454947) 2015 TE_{192} | 17 September 1998 | list |
| (454996) 2015 TM_{243} | 20 October 1998 | list |
| (458186) 2010 NU_{72} | 3 October 1997 | list |
| (458814) 2011 SY_{256} | 27 January 1998 | list |

| (461137) 2015 TH_{102} | 14 October 1998 | list |
| (461245) 2015 WU_{15} | 5 December 1997 | list |
| (463439) 2013 MQ_{5} | 25 August 1998 | list |
| (463838) 2014 TX_{73} | 8 November 1997 | list |
| (464396) 2016 BR_{12} | 14 February 1999 | list |
| (464718) 2002 RV_{202} | 21 October 1998 | list |
| (468044) 2013 QU_{74} | 20 July 1998 | list |
| (474109) 2016 LB_{28} | 17 January 1998 | list |
| (477288) 2009 ST_{157} | 14 October 1998 | list |
| (479188) 2013 CS_{66} | 6 February 1997 | list |
| (479559) 2014 CT_{3} | 1 August 1997 | list |
| (480225) 2015 GO_{36} | 4 September 1997 | list |
| (480817) 1998 SJ_{2} | 18 September 1998 | list |
| (481012) 2004 RW_{161} | 22 July 1998 | list |
| (482831) 2013 YC_{84} | 23 July 1998 | list |
| (487513) 2014 TM_{47} | 14 October 1998 | list |
| (489595) 2007 TT_{152} | 1 August 1998 | list |
| (494450) 2016 UY_{142} | 6 September 1997 | list |
| (494472) 2016 WM_{12} | 3 October 1997 | list |
| (495450) 2014 TJ_{8} | 4 September 1997 | list |
| (499662) 2010 VM_{127} | 6 December 1997 | list |
| (501718) 2014 UL_{42} | 2 October 1997 | list |
| (501958) 2014 YY_{10} | 17 January 1998 | list |
| (502233) 2015 BQ_{90} | 21 October 1998 | list |
| (503245) 2015 JM_{2} | 26 December 1998 | list |

| (513127) 1998 VR_{2} | 10 November 1998 | list |
| (514345) 2016 PA_{93} | 30 September 1997 | list |
| (516992) 2012 RS_{37} | 19 June 1998 | list |
| (520599) 2014 OR_{405} | 22 October 1998 | list |

== See also ==
- List of minor planet discoverers § ODAS
- Spaceguard
- List of near-Earth object observation projects
