= CERGA Observatory =

Centre de recherches en géodynamique et astrométrie
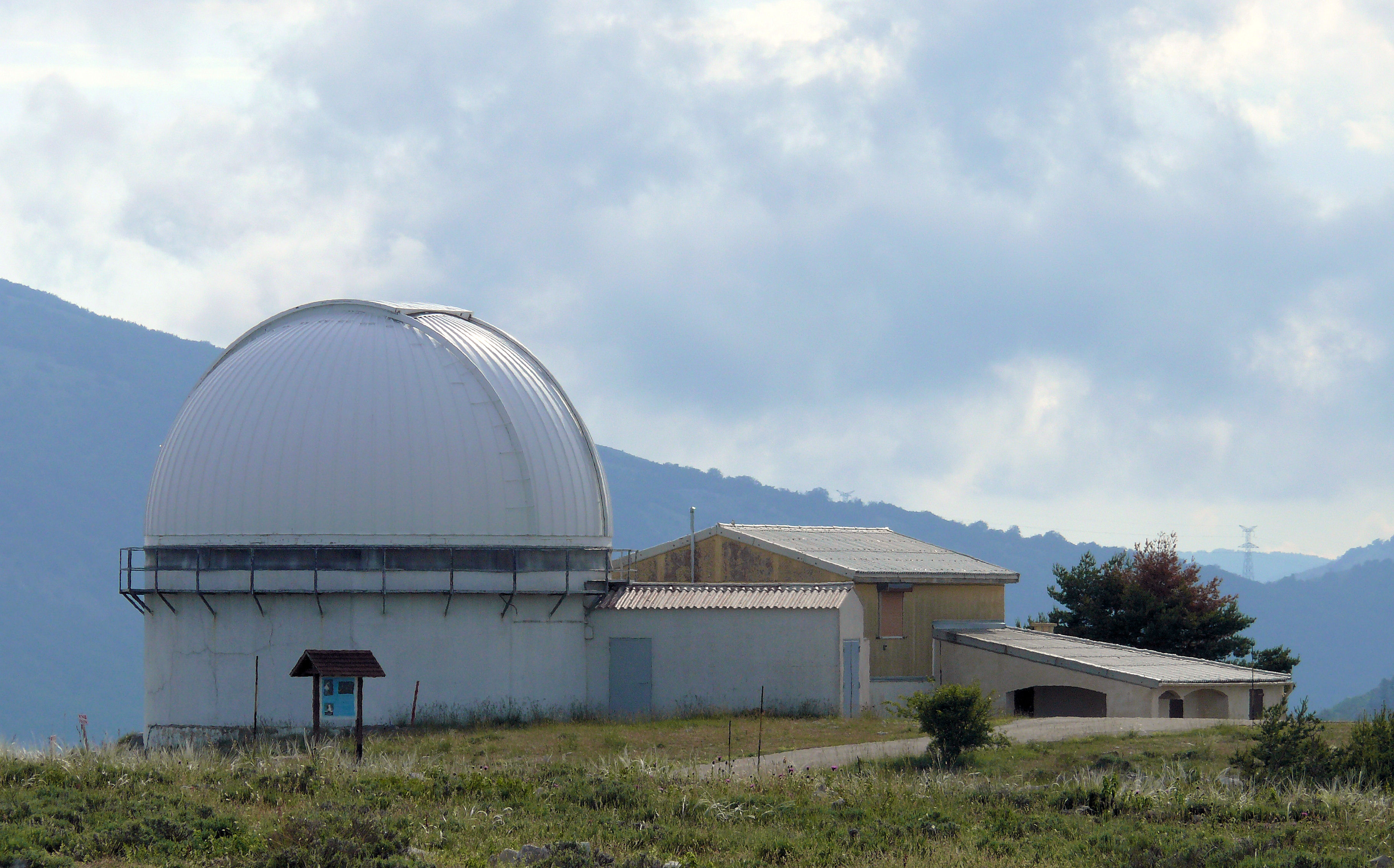
- Alternative names: CERGA
- Observatory code: 010
- Location: 8687 Caussols
- Coordinates: 43°45′11″N 6°55′21″E
- Location of CERGA Observatory

The CERGA Observatory (French: Centre de recherches en géodynamique et astrométrie, pronounced [sɑ̃tʁ də ʁəʃɛʁʃ ɑ̃ ʒeɔdinamik e astʁɔmetʁi]; obs. code: 010) was a scientific department and astronomical station of the Côte d'Azur Observatory in southern France, where several asteroids were discovered during 1984–1993.

== Description ==
CERGA included 28 researchers and as many engineers and technicians located on the Observatory sites of Nice, Grasse and Calern (Caussols). The scientific activities covered fields as diverse as fundamental astronomy, celestial mechanics, and space geodesy. CERGA was in charge of several observing facilities of the Lunar Laser Ranging experiment, for example, the lunar-laser ranging telescope and the two satellite laser stations.

By nature the scientific activity involved the acquisition of data and their processing, a dedicated instrumental development and a close relationship with the more theoretical aspects in dynamics and observation modelling.

CERGA was dissolved in 2004 when the parent Côte d'Azur Observatory re-organized. The main-belt asteroid 2252 CERGA was named for the observatory, where this asteroid was discovered by Kōichirō Tomita.

== List of discovered minor planets ==
Minor planets discovered: 21
see § List of discovered minor planets

The Minor Planet Center directly credits the CERGA observatory with the discovery of 21 asteroids made during 1984–1993. The discoveries were made using the observatory's 0.9-meter Schmidt telescope.

| 3913 Chemin | 2 December 1986 | list |
| 4602 Heudier | 28 October 1986 | list |
| 4603 Bertaud | 25 November 1986 | list |
| 4892 Chrispollas | 11 October 1985 | list |
| 5576 Albanese | 26 October 1986 | list |
| 5671 Chanal | 13 December 1985 | list |
| 5769 Michard | 6 August 1987 | list |
| 6375 Fredharris | 1 October 1986 | list |
| 6587 Brassens | 27 November 1984 | list |
| 6820 Buil | 13 December 1985 | list |
| 7928 Bijaoui | 27 November 1986 | list |

| 8080 Intel | 17 November 1987 | list |
| 8636 Malvina | 17 October 1985 | list |
| 9553 Colas | 17 October 1985 | list |
| 13499 Steinberg | 1 October 1986 | list |
| 13500 Viscardy | 6 August 1987 | list |
| (17405) 1986 VQ_{2} | 4 November 1986 | list |
| (27704) 1984 WB_{4} | 27 November 1984 | list |
| (55734) 1986 WD_{6} | 27 November 1986 | list |
| (65660) 1985 PM_{1} | 14 August 1985 | list |
| 100122 Alpes Maritimes | 15 August 1993 | list |

== See also ==
- List of minor planet discoverers § CERGA
- OCA–DLR Asteroid Survey
