= Meanings of minor-planet names: 13001–14000 =

As minor planet discoveries are confirmed, they are given a permanent number by the IAU's Minor Planet Center (MPC), and the discoverers can then submit names for them, following the IAU's naming conventions. The list below concerns those minor planets in the specified number-range that have received names, and explains the meanings of those names.

Official naming citations of newly named small Solar System bodies are approved and published in a bulletin by IAU's Working Group for Small Bodies Nomenclature (WGSBN). Before May 2021, citations were published in MPC's Minor Planet Circulars for many decades. Recent citations can also be found on the JPL Small-Body Database (SBDB). Until his death in 2016, German astronomer Lutz D. Schmadel compiled these citations into the Dictionary of Minor Planet Names (DMP) and regularly updated the collection.

Based on Paul Herget's The Names of the Minor Planets, Schmadel also researched the unclear origin of numerous asteroids, most of which had been named prior to World War II. This article incorporates text from this source, which is in the public domain: SBDB New namings may only be added to this list below after official publication as the preannouncement of names is condemned. The WGSBN publishes a comprehensive guideline for the naming rules of non-cometary small Solar System bodies.

== 13001–13100 ==
Named minor planet	Provisional	This minor planet was named for...	Ref; Catalog
13001 Woodney	1981 VL	Laura M. Woodney (born 1970), American astronomer at Lowell Observatory	MPC · 13001
13002 Vickihorner	1982 BJ_{13}	Vicki M. Horner (1957–2002), an American planetary geologist.	IAU · 13002
13003 Dickbeasley	1982 FN	Richard ("Dick") E. Beasley (1934–1992) was a noted calligrapher and multi-media artist. A teacher and administrator at Northern Arizona University, Flagstaff, Beasley was in demand for workshops and symposia worldwide and garnered numerous commissions	JPL · 13003
13004 Aldaz	1982 RR	Luis Aldaz (born 1925), meteorologist and scientific leader at Amundsen–Scott and Byrd Station in Antarctica during 1959–1964. Mount Aldaz, in Marie Byrd Land, was named for him by ACAN, the Advisory Committee on Antarctic Names	JPL · 13004
13005 Stankonyukhov	1982 SQ_{7}	Stanislav Nikolaevich Konyukhov (born 1937), Ukrainian satellite and launch vehicle designer	JPL · 13005
13006 Schwaar	1983 AC_{1}	Pierre-Yves Schwaar (1946–2000), Swiss amateur optician and telescope maker, member of the Saguaro Astronomy Club of Phoenix, AZ	JPL · 13006
13009 Voloshchuk	1985 PB_{2}	Yuri Voloshchuk (born 1941), Ukrainian radioastronomer and professor at the Kharkov University	JPL · 13009
13010 Germantitov	1986 QR_{5}	Gherman Titov (1935–2000), Russian pilot-cosmonaut and cosmologist	JPL · 13010
13011 Loeillet	1987 QS_{5}	Jean-Baptiste Loeillet of London (1680–1730), Belgian composer of baroque music	JPL · 13011
13014 Hasslacher	1987 WJ_{1}	Marian Brasseau Hasslacher (1901–1997) and Charles Alfred (Carl) Hasslacher (1897–1973), maternal grandparents of the discoverer.	JPL · 13014
13015 Noradokei	1987 XC	Noradokei is a clock tower handmade by Hatakenaka Genma in 1897 at Aki city, Kochi prefecture, when clocks were still new to Japan. People working on the nearby fields were able to tell precise times from this clock. It is preserved as the city's cultural symbol.	JPL · 13015
13017 Owakenoomi	1988 FM	Owakenoomi was a ruler of north Musashi in the latter half of the fifth century. The leader of a troop of guardsmen of the Emperor Yuuryaku, he was buried in the Inariyama old burial mounds in Gyodashi, Saitama prefecture, with an iron sword inlaid with gold that is now a national treasure	JPL · 13017
13018 Geoffjames	1988 GF	Geoffrey K. James (born 1956), Deputy manager for earth sciences at JPL.	JPL · 13018
13024 Conradferdinand	1989 AJ_{6}	Conrad Ferdinand Meyer (1825–1898), Swiss poet and historical novelist	JPL · 13024
13025 Zürich	1989 BA	Zürich, Switzerland	MPC · 13025
13027 Geeraerts	1989 GJ_{4}	Jef Geeraerts (Jozef Adriaan Geeraerts; 1930–2015), Flemish author	MPC · 13027
13028 Klaustschira	1989 GQ_{6}	Klaus Tschira (1940–2015), German billionaire and cofounder of SAP AG	MPC · 13028
13031 Durance	1989 SN_{4}	Durance river, in southeastern France	JPL · 13031
13032 Tarn	1989 TU_{3}	Tarn river, in southern France	JPL · 13032
13033 Gardon	1989 TB_{5}	Gardon or Gard river, in southern France, an affluent of the Rhône	JPL · 13033
13034 Nobuowatanabe	1989 UN	Nobuo Watanabe, Japanese amateur astronomer.	IAU · 13034
13037 Potosi	1990 EN_{3}	Potosi, a famous mining town in Bolivia, was founded in 1546. During 1556–1783 almost 45~000 tons of pure silver were mined from the Cerro Rico, with 7000 tons going to the Spanish monarchy. Thousands of Incan workers died from exhaustion and mercury poisoning. They were replaced by African slaves	JPL · 13037
13038 Woolston	1990 EN_{4}	Thomas Woolston (1669–1731), an English deist.	JPL · 13038
13039 Awashima	1990 FK_{1}	Awashima Island, Niigata prefecture, in the Sea of Japan.	JPL · 13039
13044 Wannes	1990 QO_{8}	Wannes van de Velde (1937–2008) was a Flemish singer, musician and poet. He sang his rebellious songs in the local dialect of Antwerp, a choice that was not always appreciateid by the city's intelligentia. His song Ik wil deze nacht in de straten verdwalen ("This night I want to stray through the city") became popular	JPL · 13044
13045 Vermandere	1990 QP_{8}	Willem Vermandere (born 1940), a Flemish singer of countryside songs, performs in the colorful West Flemish dialect "Westhoek". Although barely understood by his fellow countrymen, he is esteemed for his critical views on society, the church and World War I. His song Blance and his horse is well known	JPL · 13045
13046 Aliev	1990 QB_{19}	Shamil' Gimbatovich Aliev (born 1943) is a Russian specialist in the field of applied mathematics and naval design	JPL · 13046
13049 Butov	1990 RF_{17}	Anatolij Sergeevich Butov (born 1939), an expert in the field of computing in transport economics.	JPL · 13049
13052 Las Casas	1990 SN_{8}	Bartolomé de las Casas (1474–1565), a Catholic priest who fought for the rights of the Indians and against the military conquest of the New World.	JPL · 13052
13053 Bertrandrussell	1990 SQ_{8}	British philosopher and mathematician Bertrand Russell (1872–1970) was one of the twentieth century's premier logicians and author with A. N. Whitehead of Principia Mathematica. Also known for his antiwar activism, humanitarian ideals and freedom of thought, he was awarded the Nobel Prize for Literature in 1950	JPL · 13053
13055 Kreppein	1990 TW_{12}	Wolfgang Kreppein (born 1948) is a German physician and dermatologist.	JPL · 13055
13057 Jorgensen	1990 VF_{8}	Carl Jorgensen, Canadian amateur astronomer	MPC · 13057
13058 Alfredstevens	1990 WN_{3}	Alfred Stevens (1823–1906) was a Belgian painter with a preference for portraying graceful female subjects, e.g., Salomè (1888). His impressionist friends envied him for his successful paintings, but his style was too realistic for him to be considered an impressionist	JPL · 13058
13059 Ducuroir	1991 BD_{1}	Marc Ducuroir (1932–2003), Belgian amateur astronomer, secretary of the Société Royale Belge d'Astronomie	JPL · 13059
13062 Podarkes	1991 HN	Podarkes, son of Iphiclus and full brother of Protesilaos, led the Achaians and took 40 black ships to the Trojan war.	JPL · 13062
13063 Purifoy	1991 LB	Dana D. Purifoy (born 1955), a pilot in the Flight Crew Branch of NASA's Dryden Flight Research Center, Edwards, California.	JPL · 13063
13064 Haemhouts	1991 PC_{6}	Ben Haemhouts (born 1972) is a Belgian conductor, trombonist and composer, who studied during 1999–2002 with the Russian conductor A. Polyanichko. Currently he is the director of the Belgian Chamber Philharmonic Orchestra, and his performance of Mendelssohn's Italian Symphony in Oct. 2009 was much appreciated	JPL · 13064
13069 Umbertoeco	1991 RX_{1}	Umberto Eco (1932–2016) was an Italian philosopher and novelist, well known for his novels Il nome della rosa (1980) and Il pendolo di Foucault (1988). He was the president of the Scuola Superiore di Studi Umanistici at the University of Bologna	JPL · 13069
13070 Seanconnery	1991 RO_{2}	Sean Connery (1930–2020), Scottish film actor	MPC · 13070
13077 Edschneider	1991 VD_{10}	Edward T. Scheider (born 1948) serves as a staff pilot and T-38 instructor pilot at NASA's Johnson Space Center in Houston, Texas.	JPL · 13077
13079 Toots	1992 CD_{3}	Jean-Baptiste, Baron ("Toots") Thielemans (born 1922) is a Belgian jazz harmonica player who worked with Charlie Parker, Ella Fitzgerald, Billy Joel and others	JPL · 13079
13082 Gutiérrez	1992 EY_{10}	Pedro J. Gutiérrez (b.~1972) of the Instituto de Astrofísica de Andalucía—Consejo Superior de Investigaciones Cientificas in Granada, Spain, has used thermophysical modeling to study the evolution of comets and their orbits	JPL · 13082
13084 Virchow	1992 GC_{8}	Rudolf Virchow, German pathologist	MPC · 13084
13085 Borlaug	1992 HA_{4}	Norman Ernest Borlaug (1914–2009), a U.S. agronomist and a central figure in the "green revolution", collaborated for many years with Mexican scientists on the development of new wheat varieties. In 1970 he received the Nobel Peace Prize and subsequently pursued efforts to eliminate hunger in Asia and Africa	JPL · 13085
13086 Sauerbruch	1992 HS_{4}	Ferdinand Sauerbruch (1875–1951), a German surgeon who devised many improvements in surgical procedures, including the so-called pressure-difference procedure in thoracic surgery. He devised artificial limbs that move voluntarily after amputation by using the muscles of the stump.	JPL · 13086
13087 Chastellux	1992 OV_{6}	François-Jean de Chastellux (1734–1788), author of De la félicité publique (1757), was a founder of the social sciences. He sought to determine whether society is susceptible to amelioration, if not to perfection. He cited America as an example of man's ability to progress through liberty, reason and equality.	JPL · 13087
13088 Filipportera	1992 PB_{1}	Filippo Portera (born 1955), a Sicilian composer of electronic music.	JPL · 13088
13092 Schrödinger	1992 SS_{16}	Erwin Schrödinger (1887–1961), Austrian physicist, born in Vienna, who founded wave mechanics in 1926. Later he worked in relativistic quantum mechanics, the theory of gravity and unified field theory. Together with Dirac, he received the 1933 Nobel prize in physics.	JPL · 13092
13093 Wolfgangpauli	1992 SQ_{24}	Wolfgang Pauli (1900–1958), Austrian physicist, born in Vienna, was co-founder of quantum theory. He discovered the Pauli principle, which explains the level structure of atoms. He received the 1945 Nobel prize in physics.	JPL · 13093
13094 Shinshuueda	1992 UK_{8}	Ueda area of Nagano prefecture, Japan, called Shinshu and surrounded by the 2000-metre-high mountains of Joshin-etsu highland national park	JPL · 13094
13096 Tigris	1993 BE_{5}	The Tigris river, which flows south from the mountains of southeastern Turkey through Iraq and empties itself into the Persian Gulf	MPC · 13096
13097 Lamoraal	1993 BU_{7}	Lamoral, Count of Egmont (1522–1568), was a Flemish nobleman. Together with William of Orange and the Count of Hoorne he protested against the Spanish Inquisition. His life, capture and execution were memorialized in Goethe's play Egmont, with music by Beethoven to accompany its first performance in 1810	JPL · 13097

== 13101–13200 ==
back to top

Named minor planet	Provisional	This minor planet was named for...	Ref; Catalog
13101 Fransson	1993 FS_{10}	Claes Fransson (born 1951), a professor in astronomy at Stockholm University. [MPC 84377]	MPC · 13101
13107 Rudolfdvorak	1993 FE_{59}	Rudolf Dvorak, Austrian professor at University of Vienna.	IAU · 13107
13109 Berzelius	1993 JB_{1}	Jöns Jacob Berzelius (1779–1848), a Swedish chemist who discovered the chemical law of constant proportions in 1828. This led to the development of the modern system of chemical notation. Berzelius is also credited with identifying the chemical elements silicon, selenium, thorium and cerium	JPL · 13109
13111 Papacosmas	1993 OW_{1}	Constantine Papacosmas (born 1939), Canadian amateur astronomer †	MPC · 13111
13112 Montmorency	1993 QV_{4}	Philip de Montmorency, Count of Horn (1524–1568), was stadtholder of Guelders and an admiral of Flanders. Together with William of Orange and the Count of Egmont, he resisted the introduction of the Spanish Inquisition in the Netherlands. He and Egmont were condemned to death and beheaded in Brussels	JPL · 13112
13113 Williamyeats	1993 RQ_{5}	William Butler Yeats (1865–1939) an Irish poet and recipient of the Nobel prize for literature in 1923. He was known for his highly artistic form that gave expression to the spirit of a whole nation. On his grave in County Sligo is the advice "Cast a cold Eye On life, on death. Horseman, pass by!"	JPL · 13113
13114 Isabelgodin	1993 SU_{4}	Isabel Godin des Odonais (Isabel de Casa Mayor, 1728–1792) was the wife of Jean Godin des Odonais, a technician of the La Condamine expedition in Peru. In order to join her husband, who had left for La Cayenne, she had to make her way through the Amazon forest, losing all her travel companions and fighting against sickness and hunger	JPL · 13114
13115 Jeangodin	1993 SU_{6}	Jean Godin des Odonais (1713–1792) was the nephew of Louis Godin, one of the members of the La Condamine expedition in Peru. In May 1736 he joined the expedition and married Isabel de Casa Mayor, an heiress from a very wealthy family. Back in France he composed a grammar for the quichua language	JPL · 13115
13116 Hortensia	1993 TG_{26}	Hortensia is the name of a flower (Hydrangea hortensia) introduced to France by the astronomer Le Gentil on his return from observing the transits of Venus in India. Although he originally proposed to name this flower Pautia, either name would honor the orbit computer Nicole-Reine Etable de la Briere Hortense Lepaute.	JPL · 13116
13117 Pondicherry	1993 TW_{38}	Pondicherry is a city on the Coromandel coast in southeast India, founded by the French in 1674. In 1760 the astronomer Le Gentil traveled there to observe the transits of Venus in 1761 and 1769. Today the city is a popular destination for tourists.	JPL · 13117
13118 La Harpe	1993 UX_{4}	Jean François de La Harpe (1739–1803), a French writer	JPL · 13118
13121 Tisza	1994 CN_{9}	Tisza River is a major tributary of the Danube river, with its source in the Carpathian Mountains. The Tisza flows through a small portion of Ukraine and then into Hungary. The river has recently been heavily polluted by cyanide, endangering its fauna.	JPL · 13121
13122 Drava	1994 CV_{9}	Drava River is a major tributary of the Danube river. It flows from its source in the Italian Alps, through the Austrian federal states of Tirol and Kärnten. Huns and Slavs invaded the Alpine countries through its valley.	MPC · 13122
13123 Tyson	1994 KA	Neil deGrasse Tyson (born 1958), American astrophysicist and educator. Director of New York City's Hayden Planetarium.	MPC · 13123
13125 Tobolsk	1994 PK_{5}	Tobolsk is a Russian city in western Siberia, at the confluence of the Irtysh and Tobol rivers. Founded in 1587, it became a major center of early Russian colonization in Siberia. In 1761, astronomer Chappe d´Auteroche successfully observed the transit of Venus there.	JPL · 13125
13126 Calbuco	1994 PT_{16}	Calbuco volcano, is a strato volcano in southern Chile.	JPL · 13126
13127 Jeroenbrouwers	1994 PN_{25}	Jeroen Brouwers (born 1940), an Indonesian-born Dutch writer, who has won many literary prizes.	JPL · 13127
13128 Aleppo	1994 PS_{28}	Aleppo, a city in Syria which, since the 2nd century BC, is at the crossroad of several trade roads and still reflects the rich culture of its successive occupants.	JPL · 13128
13129 Poseidonios	1994 PC_{29}	Poseidonios (c. 135 BCE-c. 51 BCE), a Greek Stoic philosopher, astronomer and geographer. He was celebrated as a polymath who attempted to create a unified system for understanding human intellect and the universe, which would provide an explanation for human behavior.	JPL · 13129
13130 Dylanthomas	1994 PW_{31}	Dylan Marlais Thomas (1914–1953), a Welsh neo-romantic poet and writer.	JPL · 13130
13131 Palmyra	1994 PL_{32}	Palmyra, an ancient Semitic city, was first mentioned in the early second millennium BC as a caravan stop for travelers in the Syrian Desert.	JPL · 13131
13132 Ortelius	1994 PO_{32}	Abraham Ortelius (1527–1598), a Flemish cartographer and geographer.	JPL · 13132
13133 Jandecleir	1994 PL_{34}	Jan Decleir (born 1946), a Flemish movie and stage actor.	JPL · 13133
13140 Shinchukai	1994 VW_{2}	Shinchukai is the name of the alumni association of Shingu Middle School, Wakayama prefecture. The school was founded in 1901 and was succeeded by Shingu High School in 1948. Haruo Sato (poet and novelist, 1892–1964) and Takeo Hatanaka (astronomer, 1914–1963) were among the members	JPL · 13140
13145 Cavezzo	1995 DZ_{1}	Cavezzo, a small town in northern Italy.	JPL · 13145
13146 Yuriko	1995 DR_{2}	Yuriko Okuni, wife of the discoverer.	JPL · 13146
13147 Foglia	1995 DZ_{11}	Sergio Foglia (born 1972), an Italian amateur astronomer and discoverer of minor planets. He is an AAVSO member and the secretary of the Minor Planets Section of the Italian Astrophile Union (Italian: Unione Astrofili Italiani). Src	MPC · 13147
13149 Heisenberg	1995 EF_{8}	Werner Heisenberg (1901–1976), a German theoretical physicist, co-founder of quantum theory who formulated the uncertainty principle. He worked in nuclear physics and cosmic radiation and tried to define a unified field theory. He also explained sociopolitical problems in popular publications. He received the Nobel prize for physics in 1932.	JPL · 13149
13150 Paolotesi	1995 FS	Paolo Tesi (born 1959), elder son of Italian amateur astronomer Luciano Tesi who co-discovered this minor planet.	JPL · 13150
13151 Polino	1995 OH	Polino, a typical village with about 250 inhabitants, is the smallest municipality in Italy.	JPL · 13151
13154 Petermrva	1995 RC	Peter Mrva (born 1962) Slovak astronomer who was one of the first to help building the Astronomical Observatory of Modra. During years of mostly manual labor he taught, helped to explain and inspired the second discoverer in some areas, including astronomy and computer graphics.	JPL · 13154
13156 Mannoucyo	1995 SP_{3}	Mannoucyo is the name of a new town in Kagawa prefecture on Shikoku island. It was formed from the merging of the three towns Mannoucho, Kotonamicho and Chunancho. The new town has approximately 900 small reservoirs, including Mannou Pond for irrigation, the largest irrigation pond in Japan	JPL · 13156
13157 Searfoss	1995 TQ_{6}	Richard A. Searfoss (1956–2018), an American astronaut who served as a research pilot at NASA's Dryden Flight Research Center, Edwards, California. He is a veteran of three space flights, having been pilot on Space Shuttle missions STS-58 and STS-76 and commander on STS-90.	JPL · 13157
13158 Carcano	1995 UE	Arturo Carcano, Italian amateur astronomer	IAU · 13158
13162 Ryokkochigaku	1995 UK_{44}	Ryokkochigaku is the nickname of the Yokohama Midorigaoka High School earth-science club, known for its research of whale fossils and observation of solar prominences.	JPL · 13162
13163 Koyamachuya	1995 UC_{45}	Chuya Koyama (born 1978), a Japanese cartoonist, who created Ucyu Kyodai (Space Brothers), a scientific comic featuring the universe and the future. He has won numerous awards.	JPL · 13163
13168 Danoconnell	1995 XW	Daniel O'Connell, astronomer and core member at the Air Force Maui Optical and Supercomputing observatory	MPC · 13168
13174 Timossi	1996 CT_{8}	Aldo Timossi, a promoter of conventions, workshops and scientific meetings related to the advancement of planetary and minor planet study and also of the IMPACT Project (International Monitoring Program for Asteroid and Comet Threat).	JPL · 13174
13176 Kobedaitenken	1996 HE_{1}	Kobedaitenken, short for Kobe-Daigaku Tenmon Kenkyu-kai ("Kobe University astronomy club"), to which the second discoverer belonged during his student days.	JPL · 13176
13177 Hansschmidt	1996 HS_{11}	Hans Schmidt (1923–2003) German co-founder of the Hoher List Observatory together with Friedrich Becker (1900–1990). Schmidt was specialized in the observation and reduction of eclipsing stars. Later, he became general director of the Bonner Universitäts-Sternwarte.	JPL · 13177
13178 Catalan	1996 HF_{18}	Eugène Charles Catalan (1814–1894) was a French-Belgian mathematician, known in particular for the "Catalan numbers". His left-wing convictions caused him to be expelled from the Ecole Polytechnique in Paris. In 1865 the University of Liège honored him with the chair of Analysis	JPL · 13178
13179 Johncochrane	1996 HU_{18}	John Dundas Cochrane (1780–1825) was a Scottish explorer who during 1820–1823 crossed on foot from Russia to Kamchatka. His remarkable journey has been described in A pedestrian journey through Russia and Siberian Tartary, to the frontiers of China, the Frozen Sea and Kamtchatka (1829)	JPL · 13179
13180 Fourcroy	1996 HV_{19}	Antoine-François de Fourcroy (1755–1809), French chemist and co-founder of the École polytechnique	JPL · 13180
13181 Peneleos	1996 RS_{28}	Peneleos, leader of Boeotia, killed by Eurypylus, is said to have been one of those inside the wooden horse.	JPL · 13181
13184 Augeias	1996 TS_{49}	Augeias, the legendary king of Elis, father of Agasthenes and grandfather of Polyxenos. Allusion is made to the exploit of Hercules cleaning his stables.	JPL · 13184
13185 Agasthenes	1996 TH_{52}	Agasthenes, son of legendary king Augeias from Greek mythology.	JPL · 13185
13188 Okinawa	1997 AH_{5}	Okinawa, the southwesternmost prefecture in Japan, has a complicated history and beautiful sea and islands. The Okinawa Tracking and Communication Station of the Japan Aerospace Exploration Agency is located on a hill to conduct command operations and receive telemetry from satellites that observe the earth or the moon	JPL · 13188
13192 Quine	1997 BU_{5}	Willard Van Orman Quine (1908–2000), American logician and philosopher, was initially trained in mathematics and became a professor of philosophy at Harvard University (1936–1978). He was a prolific scholar whose contributions range from mathematical logic to a constructivist analysis of philosophy.	JPL · 13192
13196 Rogerssmith	1997 CE_{8}	Rogers E. Smith (born 1936) served as the Chief of the Flight Crew Branch at NASA's Dryden Flight Research Center, Edwards, California, where he also flew as project pilot for a number of NASA research aircraft.	JPL · 13196
13197 Pontecorvo	1997 DC	Bruno Pontecorvo, a student of Enrico Fermi and the first to theorize the neutrino oscillation that produces three different particles.	JPL · 13197
13198 Banpeiyu	1997 DT	Banpeiyu (Citrus Banpeiyu) is a large, round, yellow citrus fruit that is a specialty of Kumamoto prefecture. The largest known example was collected in 2005 and weighed 4.858 kg	JPL · 13198
13200 Romagnani	1997 EQ_{40}	Sauro Romagnani (born 1942), an Italian teacher at the San Marcello junior high school, was selected to participate in a research teaching team for the Educational European Center. He contributed to the founding of the local public library and establishment of the Astronomical Observatory in the Pistoia area.	JPL · 13200

== 13201–13300 ==
back to top

Named minor planet	Provisional	This minor planet was named for...	Ref; Catalog
13206 Baer	1997 GC_{22}	James J. Baer (born 1965), a member of the Faculty of Mathematics at South University.	MPC · 13206
13207 Tamagawa	1997 GZ_{25}	Tamagawa, located in the eastern part of Ehime prefecture, is home of Tamagawa Junior High School.	JPL · 13207
13208 Fraschetti	1997 GA_{38}	George Fraschetti (born 1941), a technical advisor and contributor to the NEAT instruments.	JPL · 13208
13209 Arnhem	1997 GQ_{41}	Arnhem, a name derived from the presence of eagles, is a city near the Rhine river in the eastern part of the Netherlands. It is famous for archaeological evidence of human activity there in the Stone Age, some 70~000 years ago	JPL · 13209
13211 Stucky	1997 JH_{6}	Mark P. Stucky (born 1958) served as a NASA research pilot at the Johnson Space Center, Houston, Texas, instructing Space Shuttle astronauts in the T-38 and the Gulfstream-II Shuttle Training Aircraft, and at the Dryden Flight Research Center, Edwards, California.	JPL · 13211
13212 Jayleno	1997 JL_{13}	Jay Leno (born 1950) is an American television personality	JPL · 13212
13213 Maclaurin	1997 JB_{15}	Colin Maclaurin (1698–1746), a Scottish mathematician known for his "Taylor adapted series", which he used for adding powers of arithmetic progressions. He is particularly honored for his Treatise of Fluxions (1742), in which he presented for the first time Newton's methods on this subject	JPL · 13213
13214 Chirikov	1997 JJ_{16}	Aleksei Chirikov (1703–1748) was a Russian navigator who in 1741 discovered and reached the coast of Alaska, during the "great Northern Expedition". He also discovered some of the Aleutian islands and took part in creating a general map of the Russian discoveries in the Pacific Ocean	JPL · 13214
13217 Alpbach	1997 ML_{2}	Alpbach, an Austrian mountain village situated in the Tyrolean Alps, hosts the annual Summer School Alpbach. It is also famous for the international congress European Forum Alpbach, organized there every summer since 1945 to provide an important platform for economists, scientists, politicians and artists	JPL · 13217
13219 Cailletet	1997 MB_{9}	Louis Paul Cailletet (1832–1913), a French physicist who was the first to liquefy oxygen, nitrogen, hydrogen and other gases. Liquefied nitrogen is used by astronomers to refrigerate imaging detectors to reduce thermal background noise and make faint minor planets detectable.	JPL · 13219
13220 Kashiwagura	1997 NG_{3}	Mitsuru Kashiwagura (born 1950), a Japanese amateur astronomer and high school teacher in Ooe, Yamagata prefecture. He has been observing occultations since 1994.	JPL · 13220
13221 Nao	1997 OY	Naomi Nakamura (born 1965), whose nickname is Nao, is the wife of the discoverer, Akimasa Nakamura.	JPL · 13221
13222 Ichikawakazuo	1997 OV_{2}	Kazuo Ichikawa (born 1955) is a postman and the associate president of the Nanyo Astronomical Club since 1988.	JPL · 13222
13223 Cenaceneri	1997 PQ_{4}	The Ash Wednesday Supper (Italian: La Cena delle Ceneri), is a philosophical work by Giordano Bruno that was published in 1584, in which, for the first time in Western philosophical thought, there is discussion of the infinity of worlds in the universe.	JPL · 13223
13224 Takamatsuda	1997 PL_{5}	Takashi Matsuda, Japanese primary-school teacher and amateur astronomer.	JPL · 13224
13225 Manfredi	1997 QU_{1}	Eustachio Manfredi (1674–1739), and his brothers Gabriele (1681–1761) and Eraclito (1682–1759), were professors at the University of Bologna, of astronomy, mathematics and medicine-cum-geometry. Eustachio was the author of the famous Istituzioni astronomiche, published as the second volume of his works.	JPL · 13225
13226 Soulié	1997 SH	Guy Soulié (born 1920) made photometric observations of the zodiacal light, measured positions of comets, planets and their satellites and wrote astrometric reduction programs. A member of the Hipparcos Input Catalog team, he also discovered double stars and minor planets.	JPL · 13226
13227 Poor	1997 SR_{8}	Kim Poor (born 1952), an American astronomical artist known for his use of brilliant colors and dramatic scenery. He founded NovaSpace Galleries, which promotes space art and provides a focused outreach to the public for the genre	JPL · 13227
13229 Echion	1997 VB_{1}	Echion from Greek mythology, one of the Achaean warriors who entered Troy in the wooden horse —but who died when jumping down from it	JPL · 13229
13231 Blondelet	1998 BL_{14}	Jacques Blondelet (1934–1998) was a former president of the Société Lorraine d´Astronomie and vice president of the Observatoire Provençal d´Astrophotographie.	JPL · 13231
13232 Prabhakar	1998 FM_{54}	Ashwin Prabhakar (b. 2005) was a finalist in the 2019 Broadcom MASTERS, a math and science competition for middle-school students, for his environmental and earth sciences project. He attended the Discovery Middle School, Madison, Alabama.	IAU · 13232
13234 Natashaowen	1998 FC_{74}	Natalya Cherkassova Owen (born 1952) is Honorary Consul General of the Russian Federation in Hawaii. She has developed humanitarian missions to Eastern Russia, establishing a nonprofit foundation that is building a rehabilitation center near Vladivostok for children with cancer.	JPL · 13234
13235 Isiguroyuki	1998 HT_{42}	Nobuyuki Ishiguro (born 1959), a Japanese amateur astronomer has been active in the Nanyo Astronomical Amateurs Club since 1984.	JPL · 13235
13238 Lambeaux	1998 HU_{149}	Jef Lambeaux (1852–1908), a Belgian sculptor who belonged to the Van Beers Clique, a group of young and eccentric artists.	JPL · 13238
13239 Kana	1998 KN	Kana Nakamura (born 1999), whose initials are "KN", is the daughter of the discoverer.	JPL · 13239
13240 Thouvay	1998 KJ_{1}	Jacqueline Thouvay (born 1939), manager of the Laboratoire d´Etudes Spatiales et d´Instrumentation en Astrophysique at Paris Observatory.	JPL · 13240
13241 Biyo	1998 KM_{41}	Josette Biyo (born 1958), a Filipino high school teacher who received the Intel International Excellence in Teaching Award during the ISEF in 2002 †	MPC · 13241
13243 Randhahn	1998 KZ_{47}	Mercedes Claire Randhahn (b. 2005) was a finalist in the 2019 Broadcom MASTERS, a math and science competition for middle-school students, for her chemistry project. She attended the Saint Joseph Catholic Middle School, Ogden, Utah.	IAU · 13243
13244 Dannymeyer	1998 MJ_{14}	Danny Meyer (born 1958), restaurateur and philanthropist, promotes neighborhood rejuvenation of historic New York City buildings and parks. Meyer is a board leader of two charities focusing on feeding the hungry and is a winner of the Share Our Strength Humanitarian Award and the James Beard Humanitarian Award	JPL · 13244
13246 Hannahshu	1998 MJ_{33}	Hannah T. Shu (b. 2005) was a finalist in the 2019 Broadcom MASTERS, a math and science competition for middle-school students, for her physics project. She attended the International School of Monterey, Seaside, California.	IAU · 13246
13247 Tianshi	1998 MW_{34}	Kyle Preston Tianshi (b. 2006) was a finalist in the 2019 Broadcom MASTERS, a math and science competition for middle-school students, for his environmental and earth sciences project. He attended the Cambridge School, San Diego, California.	IAU · 13247
13248 Fornasier	1998 MT_{37}	Sonia Fornasier (born 1972), Italian astronomer at Padua Observatory (533). She studies the physical properties of cis-Jovian and trans-Neptunian objects and was involved in the development of the Rosetta mission imaging system.	MPC · 13248
13249 Marcallen	1998 MD_{38}	Marc Allen (born 1951) is a stellar and solar astronomer who has directed the Space Studies Board of the U.S. National Research Council (1991–1999) and is currently Assistant Associate Administrator for Strategic and International Planning at NASA.	JPL · 13249
13250 Danieladucato	1998 OJ	Daniela Ducato (born 1960), an active Italian amateur astronomer, has organized many astronomical public events and observing gatherings in Sardinia. She also designed the public gardens of Guspini, her native town, following themes that resembled the constellations.	JPL · 13250
13251 Viot	1998 OP	Hervé Viot (born 1961) built the CCD camera used for the ODAS survey. He was also involved in many other aspects of the telescope software and hardware. His work and competence were invaluable to the success of the project. He is now involved in other projects at the Observatoire de la Côte d´Azur.	JPL · 13251
13253 Stejneger	1998 OM_{13}	Leonhard Hess Stejneger (1851–1943) was a Norwegian-born American ornithologist and author of more than 400 scientific publications on birds, reptiles and seals. During a visit to Bering Island he became fascinated by the life of G. W. Steller, about whom he wrote a biography in 1936	JPL · 13253
13254 Kekulé	1998 OY_{13}	Friedrich August Kekulé (1829–1896), a German chemist, who, in 1865, discovered the structure of benzene as a six-membered ring of carbon atoms with alternating single and double bonds.	JPL · 13254
13256 Marne	1998 OZ_{14}	The Marne is a river in France with its source on the Langres plateau. With a length of nearly 525 km it runs generally in a north-northwest direction, passing the cities of Chaumont and Chalôns-sur-Marne. Below the city of Reims it changes its direction to continue its path to Paris, where it enters the Seine river	JPL · 13256
13257 Seanntorres	1998 QT_{8}	Seann Richard Torres (b. 2004) was a finalist in the 2019 Broadcom MASTERS, a math and science competition for middle-school students, for his environmental and earth sciences project. He attended the Saint Adelaide Academy, Highland, California.	IAU · 13257
13258 Bej	1998 QT_{12}	Gautam Ashim Bej (born 1989), 2002 DCYSC finalist. He attended the Altamont School, Birmingham, Alabama.	JPL · 13258
13259 Bhat	1998 QA_{15}	Nivedita Bhat (born 1988), 2002 DCYSC finalist. She attended the Arvida Middle School, Miami, Florida.	JPL · 13259
13260 Sabadell	1998 QZ_{15}	The Agrupació Astronòmica de Sabadell celebrated its 40th anniversary on 14 April 2000. It is the most important amateur astronomical society in Spain. The discoverers, Ferrán Casarramona and Antoni Vidal, belong to this society.	JPL · 13260
13261 Ganeshvenu	1998 QM_{16}	Ganesh Venu (b. 2005) was a finalist in the 2019 Broadcom MASTERS, a math and science competition for middle-school students, for his plant science project. He attended the Friendswood Junior High, Friendswood, Texas.	IAU · 13261
13262 Ruhiyusuf	1998 QF_{17}	Ruhi Yusuf (b. 2006) was a finalist in the 2019 Broadcom MASTERS, a math and science competition for middle-school students, for her plant science project. She attended the Challenger School Ardenwood, Newark, California.	IAU · 13262
13264 Abdelhaq	1998 QD_{23}	Aminah Abdelhaq mentored a finalist in the 2019 Broadcom MASTERS, a math and science competition for middle-school students. She teaches at the Franklin Junior High School, Mesa, Arizona.	IAU · 13264
13265 Terbunkley	1998 QP_{23}	Terrance S. Bunkley (born 1987), 2002 DCYSC finalist. He attended the Dunbar Middle School, Fort Worth, Texas.	JPL · 13265
13266 Maiabland	1998 QY_{30}	Maia Bland mentored a finalist in the 2019 Broadcom MASTERS, a math and science competition for middle-school students. She teaches at the BASIS San Antonio Shavano Campus, San Antonio, Texas.	IAU · 13266
13267 Bolechowski	1998 QV_{32}	Daniel Bolechowski mentored a finalist in the 2019 Broadcom MASTERS, a math and science competition for middle-school students. He teaches at the Rancho Christian School, Temecula, California	IAU · 13267
13268 Trevorcorbin	1998 QS_{34}	Trevor Eugene Corbin (born 1988), 2002 DCYSC finalist. He attended the Harry F. Byrd Middle School, Richmond, Virginia.	JPL · 13268
13269 Dahlstrom	1998 QV_{34}	Kurt Martin Dahlstrom (born 1988), 2002 DCYSC finalist. He attended the Hillsboro High School, Hillsboro, North Dakota.	JPL · 13269
13270 Brittonbounds	1998 QX_{35}	Britton Bounds mentored a finalist in the 2019 Broadcom MASTERS, a math and science competition for middle-school students. He teaches at the Crocker Middle School, Hillsborough, California.	IAU · 13270
13271 Gingerbyrd	1998 QZ_{35}	Ginger Byrd mentored a finalist in the 2019 Broadcom MASTERS, a math and science competition for middle-school students. She teaches at the Fugman Elementary School, Fresno, California.	IAU · 13271
13272 Ericadavid	1998 QH_{37}	Erica Elizabeth David (born 1989), 2002 DCYSC finalist. She attended the Pinedale Middle School, Pinedale, Wyoming.	JPL · 13272
13273 Cornwell	1998 QW_{37}	Walker Cornwell mentored a finalist in the 2019 Broadcom MASTERS, a math and science competition for middle-school students. He teaches at the Saint Joseph Catholic Middle School, Ogden, Utah.	IAU · 13273
13274 Roygross	1998 QX_{37}	Roy James Gross (born 1987), 2002 DCYSC finalist. He attended the Penndale Middle School, Lansdale, Pennsylvania.	JPL · 13274
13275 Kathgoetz	1998 QT_{39}	Katherine Goetz mentored a finalist in the 2019 Broadcom MASTERS, a math and science competition for middle-school students. She teaches at the Mason Middle School, Mason, Ohio.	IAU · 13275
13278 Grotecloss	1998 QK_{42}	Kristin Shannon Grotecloss (born 1988), 2002 DCYSC finalist. She attended the Southside Fundamental Middle School, St. Petersburg, Florida.	JPL · 13278
13279 Gutman	1998 QN_{43}	Jennifer Erin Gutman (born 1989), 2002 DCYSC finalist. She attended the Mt. De Chantal Visitation Academy, Wheeling, West Virginia.	JPL · 13279
13280 Christihaas	1998 QM_{44}	Christine Haas (born 1988), 2002 DCYSC finalist. She attended the Reyburn Intermediate School, Clovis, California.	JPL · 13280
13281 Aliciahall	1998 QW_{45}	Alicia Esther Hall (born 1988), 2002 DCYSC finalist. She attended the Valley High School, Hoople, North Dakota.	JPL · 13281
13282 Sharikahagan	1998 QQ_{49}	Sharika Hagan mentored a finalist in the 2019 Broadcom MASTERS, a math and science competition for middle-school students. She teaches at the Lake Forest Charter School, New Orleans, Louisiana.	IAU · 13282
13283 Dahart	1998 QF_{51}	David Andrew Hart (born 1990), 2002 DCYSC finalist. He attended the Episcopal Day School, Lake Charles, Louisiana.	JPL · 13283
13285 Stephicks	1998 QK_{52}	Stephanie Marie Hicks (born 1990), 2002 DCYSC finalist. She attended the Keystone Junior High School, San Antonio, Texas.	JPL · 13285
13286 Adamchauvin	1998 QK_{53}	Christiane Adam Chauvin (born 1952), of Paris Observatory, is responsible for research relationships with the European Community.	JPL · 13286
13292 Hernandezmon	1998 QT_{90}	Monica Hernandez mentored a finalist in the 2019 Broadcom MASTERS, a math and science competition for middle-school students. She teaches at the Georgiana Bruce Kirby Preparatory School, Santa Cruz, California.	IAU · 13292
13293 Mechelen	1998 QO_{104}	Mechelen, a Belgian city near Antwerp, was settled on the banks of the Dyle river in Gallic-Roman times. In 1303 it became the first seller of wool, and by the late Middle Ages it was a center of the cloth trade. Famous for its St. Rombout tower and Dordoens botanical garden, Michelen is known today for the cultivation of endive, asparagus and cauliflower	JPL · 13293
13294 Rockox	1998 QO_{105}	Nicolaas II Rockox (1560–1640), a humanist and maecenas, of Flemish nobility in the Spanish Netherlands. He was a highly respected citizen in Antwerp. A graduate of law from the University of Douai, he became one of the burgomasters of Antwerp in 1603, a position which he held several times.	JPL · 13294
13298 Namatjira	1998 RD_{5}	Albert Namatjira (1902–1959), landscape painter.	JPL · 13298

== 13301–13400 ==
back to top

Named minor planet	Provisional	This minor planet was named for...	Ref; Catalog
13301 Hofsteen	1998 RP_{19}	Alex Hofsteen mentored a finalist in the 2019 Broadcom MASTERS, a math and science competition for middle-school students. He teaches at the International School of Monterey, Seaside, California.	IAU · 13301
13302 Kezmoh	1998 RO_{31}	Lorren J. Kezmoh (born 1990), 2002 DCYSC finalist. She attended the Brentwood Middle School, Pittsburgh, Pennsylvania.	JPL · 13302
13303 Asmitakumar	1998 RX_{32}	Asmita Kumar (born 1988), 2002 DCYSC finalist. She attended the Goleta Valley Junior High School, Goleta, California.	JPL · 13303
13305 Danielang	1998 RD_{54}	Daniel Owen Lang (born 1988), 2002 DCYSC finalist. He attended the Independence Home School, Yardley, Pennsylvania.	JPL · 13305
13307 Taralarsen	1998 RE_{59}	Tara Larsen mentored a finalist in the 2019 Broadcom MASTERS, a math and science competition for middle-school students. She teaches at the Joaquin Moraga Intermediate School, Moraga, California.	IAU · 13307
13308 Melissamayne	1998 RL_{59}	Melissa Mayne mentored a finalist in the 2019 Broadcom MASTERS, a math and science competition for middle-school students. She teaches at the Cambridge School, San Diego, California.	IAU · 13308
13310 Nilvo	1998 RX_{63}	Jennifer Nilvo mentored a finalist in the 2019 Broadcom MASTERS, a math and science competition for middle-school students. She teaches at the School of Dreams Academy, Los Lunas, New Mexico.	IAU · 13310
13312 Orlowitz	1998 RK_{68}	Barbara Orlowitz mentored a finalist in the 2019 Broadcom MASTERS, a math and science competition for middle-school students. She teaches at the Andover School of Montessori, Andover, Massachusetts.	IAU · 13312
13313 Kathypeng	1998 RU_{68}	Kathy Peng mentored a finalist in the 2019 Broadcom MASTERS, a math and science competition for middle-school students. She teaches at the Harker School, San Jose, California.	IAU · 13313
13315 Hilana	1998 RX_{71}	Hilana Megan Lewkowitz-Shpuntoff (born 1988), 2002 DCYSC finalist. He attended the Paul W. Bell Middle School, Miami, Florida.	JPL · 13315
13316 Llano	1998 RJ_{75}	Rayden Llano (born 1988), 2002 DCYSC finalist.	JPL · 13316
13319 Michaelmi	1998 RD_{79}	Michael Mi (born 1988), 2002 DCYSC finalist. He attended the Andrew W. Mellon Middle School, Pittsburgh, Pennsylvania.	JPL · 13319
13320 Jessicamiles	1998 RL_{79}	Jessica Lian Miles (born 1988), 2002 DCYSC finalist. She attended the Keystone Junior High School, San Antonio, Texas.	JPL · 13320
13325 Valérienataf	1998 SV_{14}	Valérie Nataf Lambert (born 1959) is a well-known French TV news journalist who covers major international events. The name was suggested by M. A. Barucci and M. Fulchignoni.	JPL · 13325
13326 Ferri	1998 SH_{23}	Francesca Ferri, a planetary scientist at the University of Padua. JPL	MPC · 13326
13327 Reitsema	1998 SC_{24}	Harold Reitsema (born 1948), of Ball Aerospace, Boulder, has been a participant in many of the successful occultation expeditions to determine sizes and shapes of minor planets, and he has also used occultations to study planetary atmospheres. The name was suggested by M. F. A'Hearn.	JPL · 13327
13328 Guetter	1998 SP_{24}	Harry Hendrik Guetter (born 1935) was an astronomer at the United States Naval Observatory Flagstaff Station from 1964 until 2002. The name was suggested by C. B. Luginbuhl.	JPL · 13328
13329 Davidhardy	1998 SB_{32}	David A. Hardy (born 1936), a pioneering British astronomical artist whose work has appeared in numerous books and magazines, as well as on stage and in film. His own books include Visions of Space and The Fires Within.	JPL · 13329
13330 Dondavis	1998 SM_{46}	Don Davis (born 1952) is an American astronomical artist who got his start working on some of the first modern lunar maps with the United States Geological Survey. His attention to detail is recognized by his fellow artists. He has also contributed to books and films, including the PBS series Cosmos.	JPL · 13330
13331 Helos	1998 SU5_{2}	Helos, coastal town of Laconia listed in the Catalogue of Ships in Homer’s Iliad. It was in the realm of Menelaus and contributed ships and warriors to the Greek forces at Troy.	IAU · 13331
13332 Benkhoff	1998 SM_{58}	Johannes Benkhoff (born 1961) is a planetary scientist at the German Aerospace Center (DLR) in Berlin-Adlerhof. His research is in the field of modeling cometary nuclei, in preparation for space missions like Rosetta and Contour. He was instrumental in organizing the ACM 2002 conference. The name was suggested by G. Hahn.	JPL · 13332
13333 Carsenty	1998 SU_{59}	Uri Carsenty (born 1949) is an Israeli planetary scientist working at the German Aerospace Center (DLR) in Berlin-Adlerhof. He works on the development of cameras and electronics for planetary space mission. He has been the brains and heart behind the organisation of ACM 2002. The name was suggested by G. Hahn.	JPL · 13333
13334 Tost	1998 SX_{60}	Wilfried Tost (born 1952) is a system manager at the German Aerospace Center (DLR) in Berlin-Adlerhof. He has a keen interest in astronomy, and is active at Wilhelm Förster Sternwarte in Berlin. He was instrumental in organizing the ACM 2002 conference. The name was suggested by G. Hahn.	JPL · 13334
13335 Tobiaswolf	1998 SK_{61}	Tobias Wolf (born 1980) is an enthusiastic naked-eye observer of the moon, planets and other wonders of the sky.	JPL · 13335
13336 Jillpernell	1998 SN_{114}	Jill Pernell mentored a finalist in the 2019 Broadcom MASTERS, a math and science competition for middle-school students. She teaches at the First Baptist Church School, Shreveport, Louisiana.	IAU · 13336
13337 Sampath	1998 SZ_{114}	Vimala Sampath mentored a finalist in the 2019 Broadcom MASTERS, a math and science competition for middle-school students. She teaches at the Challenger School Ardenwood, Newark, California.	IAU · 13337
13339 Williamsmith	1998 SF_{123}	William Smith mentored a finalist in the 2019 Broadcom MASTERS, a math and science competition for middle-school students. He teaches at the Discovery Middle School, Madison, Alabama.	IAU · 13339
13341 Kellysweeney	1998 ST_{123}	Kelly Sweeney mentored a finalist in the 2019 Broadcom MASTERS, a math and science competition for middle-school students. She teaches at the Avon Grove Charter School, West Grove, Pennsylvania.	IAU · 13341
13343 Annietaylor	1998 SY_{127}	Annie Taylor mentored a finalist in the 2019 Broadcom MASTERS, a math and science competition for middle-school students. She teaches at the Saint Adelaide Academy, Highland, California.	IAU · 13343
13344 Upenieks	1998 SD_{130}	Kerrie Upenieks mentored a finalist in the 2019 Broadcom MASTERS, a math and science competition for middle-school students. She teaches at the Beehive Science & Technology Academy, Sandy, Utah.	IAU · 13344
13346 Danielmiller	1998 SP_{133}	Daniel Louis Miller Jr. (born 1988), 2002 DCYSC finalist. He attended the Frick International Studies Academy, Pittsburgh, Pennsylvania.	JPL · 13346
13349 Yarotsky	1998 SD_{139}	Misty Yarotsky mentored a finalist in the 2019 Broadcom MASTERS, a math and science competition for middle-school students. She teaches at the Friendswood Junior High, Friendswood, Texas.	IAU · 13349
13350 Gmelin	1998 ST_{144}	Johann Georg Gmelin (1709–1755) was a German naturalist who was appointed professor of chemistry and natural history at the University of St. Petersburg in 1731. From 1733 to 1743 he traveled through Siberia and his investigations were recorded in Flora Sibiria (1749–1750) and Reise durch Sibirien (1753).	JPL · 13350
13351 Zibeline	1998 SQ_{145}	Zibeline is the name of a small animal (Martes zibellina), that generally lives in the colder parts of the globe. Astronomer Chappe d´Auteroche, on his voyage to Tobolsk, Siberia, in 1761, reported how it has been hunted for its beautiful dark fur, resulting in almost complete extinction.	JPL · 13351
13352 Gyssens	1998 SZ_{163}	Marc Gyssens (born 1959) is a researcher on databases. A life-long commitment to the popularization of science, especially astronomy, led to his appointment as director of the public observatory Urania (near Antwerp). In 1988, he co-founded the International Meteor Organization.	JPL · 13352
13357 Werkhoven	1998 TE_{29}	Margaretha Cornelia Maria Werkhoven, a Dutch-Surinamese botanist at the National Herbarium of Suriname.	JPL · 13357
13358 Revelle	1998 TA_{34}	Douglas ReVelle (1945–2010), was an American meteorologist and meteor physicist at Los Alamos National Laboratory. His pioneering theoretical work include meteor physics and astronomy based on theoretical aerodynamics, meteor acoustics and the interpretation of infrasonic meteor observations. The name was suggested by Z. Ceplecha.	JPL · 13358
13365 Tenzinyama	1998 UL_{20}	Tenzinyama, a mountain in the western part of Iwamuro village, Niigata prefecture.	JPL · 13365
13367 Jiří	1998 UT_{24}	Jiří Borovička (born 1964), of the Astronomical Institute of the Academy of Sciences of the Czech Republic, is known for his work in meteor physics and astronomy, particularly in meteor spectroscopy. He discovered the low- and high-temperature components of meteor radiation.	JPL · 13367
13368 Wlodekofman	1998 UV_{24}	Wlodek Kofman (born 1945) directs the Laboratoire de Planétologie at the Université Joseph Fourier, Grenoble. He is principal investigator on the Rosetta mission's CONSERT experiment, which will use the transmission of radio waves through the nucleus of comet 46P/Wirtanen to build up a three-dimensional image.	JPL · 13368
13369 Youngblood	1998 UF_{37}	Donna Sue Youngblood mentored a finalist in the 2019 Broadcom MASTERS, a math and science competition for middle-school students. She teaches at the Gilmer Intermediate School, Gilmer, Texas.	IAU · 13369
13370 Júliusbreza	1998 VF	Július Breza (1917–1991) was one of the foremost otolaryngologists in Czechoslovakia. He was the head of the otolaryngology division at the Puerile Faculty hospital in Bratislava. His work centered on endoscopic procedures to treat disorders of the bronchi and lung in children.	JPL · 13370
13376 Dunphy	1998 VO_{32}	Desmond Plunket Dunphy, an Irish medical doctor.	JPL · 13376
13380 Yamamohammed	1998 WQ_{11}	Yahya Maqsood Mohammed (born 1988), 2002 DCYSC finalist. He attended the C.W. Ruckel Middle School, Niceville, Florida.	JPL · 13380
13387 Irus	1998 YW_{6}	The mythological Greek beggar Irus defied and, in the presence of Penelope's suitors, was defeated by Ulysses on his return to Ithaca.	JPL · 13387
13389 Stacey	1999 AG_{24}	Stacey Ward McClusky (born 1959), wife of American astronomer John V. McClusky, who discovered this minor planet.	JPL · 13389
13390 Bouška	1999 FQ_{3}	Jiří Bouška (born 1925), a Czech astronomer and emeritus professor at Charles University in Prague, studied interplanetary matter and for 30 years served as the editor of the magazine Říše hvězd (The Realm of Stars, see 4090 Říšehvězd) and the Czech Astronomical Yearbook. He taught several generations of Czech astronomers, including one of the discoverers.	JPL · 13390
13395 Deconihout	1999 RH_{35}	Serge Deconihout is a French amateur astronomer who applies his skills to telescope construction. He is the founder Valmeca, a company at the Haute Provence Observatory that produces large telescopes for both amateurs and professionals.	JPL · 13395
13396 Midavaine	1999 RU_{38}	Thierry Midavaine is vice-president of the Association Française d'Astronomie. A dedicated observer, he is also a skilled optic-electronics engineer. For many years he has helped amateur astronomers improve their observations by using image-intensifier tubes.	JPL · 13396

== 13401–13500 ==
back to top

Named minor planet	Provisional	This minor planet was named for...	Ref; Catalog
13403 Sarahmousa	1999 RJ_{167}	Sarah S. Mousa (born 1987), 2002 DCYSC finalist. She attended the Engle Middle School, West Grove, Pennsylvania.	JPL · 13403
13404 Norris	1999 RT_{177}	Noele Rosalie Norris (born 1988), 2002 DCYSC finalist. She attended the George Washington Carver Middle School, Miami, Florida.	JPL · 13404
13405 Dorisbillings	1999 ST_{1}	Doris Billings, née Dora Kawchuk, mother of the discoverer †	MPC · 13405
13406 Sekora	1999 TA_{4}	Ondřej Sekora (1899–1967), Czech journalist, cartoonist, illustrator and writer.	JPL · 13406
13407 Ikukomakino	1999 TF_{4}	Ikuko Makino (1952–2021), a Japanese wildlife lover, recalled the impressive starry night in Tasmania when she visited to observe the native marsupials, especially wombats.	IAU · 13407
13408 Deadoklestic	1999 TF_{14}	Dea Doklestic (born 1982), a geophysicist and atmospheric scientist, is the wife of the first discoverer. This minor planet is being named on the occasion of their wedding on 2009 June 21	JPL · 13408
13410 Arhale	1999 UX_{5}	Alan R. Hale (born 1941) joined with Tom Johnson in the mid-1960s in the creation and development of the Schmidt-Cassegrain telescope and its ultimate production. In this he was instrumental in bringing astronomy to many schools and ordinary people over the years	JPL · 13410
13411 OLRAP	1999 UO_{7}	OLRAP, the Orchestre Lyrique de Région Avignon Provence, was established in Avignon in 1982. The discoverer chose this name also to honor his wife, Marie-Françoise, who plays timpani in this orchestra.	JPL · 13411
13412 Guerrieri	1999 UJ_{8}	Mary Guerrieri (born 1966) has supported astronomical research at the University of Arizona. She served as an editor of the university Press Space Science Series, manager of the Lunar and Planetary Laboratory's Space Imagery Center and manager of Academic Affairs for the Department of Planetary Sciences	JPL · 13412
13413 Bobpeterson	1999 UF_{9}	Robert ("Bob") Peterson (born 1949), a graduate of the University of Arizona, was assistant director at the Steward Observatory and for over 26 years, has been responsible for U. of A. operations in the Catalinas, on Kitt Peak, the Vatican Observatory on Mt. Graham, and for the U. of A. aluminizing facility	JPL · 13413
13414 Grantham	1999 UN_{25}	James Grantham (born 1966) is the observatory operations supervisor at the Steward Observatory Mt. Lemmon Station. He played a vital role defending the telescopes at both Mt. Lemmon and Mt. Bigelow during the 2002 Bullock and 2003 Aspen wildfires. He enjoys working on his family's ranch near Arivaca, Arizona	JPL · 13414
13415 Stevenbland	1999 UT_{25}	Steven Bland (born 1967) is a member of the Mountain Operations team for Steward Observatory at the University of Arizona.	JPL · 13415
13416 Berryman	1999 UX_{25}	Jay Berryman (born 1980) is a member of the Mountain Operations team for Steward Observatory at the University of Arizona.	JPL · 13416
13421 Holvorcem	1999 VO_{12}	Paulo R. Holvorcem (born 1967), a Brazilian mathematician who has developed new numerical methods for simulating waves in rotating fluids and in free space. Since 1996 he has been observing near-earth objects and developing software that efficiently allocates telescope time during automated observations.	JPL · 13421
13423 Bobwoolley	1999 VR_{22}	Robert Woolley (born 1953) taught astronomy and was planetarium director at Montgomery College (1976–1981) and president of the Von Braun Astronomical Society (1993–1994). Since 1994 he has been conducting week-long astronomical/geological educational experiences at a dark site near Flagstaff, Arizona.	JPL · 13423
13424 Margalida	1999 VD_{24}	Margalida Rechac (born 1959) is the wife of Spanish astronomer Ángel López Jiménez, who co-discovered this minor planet.	JPL · 13424
13425 Waynebrown	1999 VG_{24}	Since 1993 Wayne Brown (born 1957) has developed and makes widely available CCD imaging systems for the astronomical and biomedical communities. He has also designed and built CCD cameras used for imaging from space.	JPL · 13425
13433 Phelps	1999 VP_{52}	Kels Gordon Phelps (born 1988), 2002 DCYSC finalist. He attended the East Middle School, Butte, Montana.	JPL · 13433
13434 Adamquade	1999 VK_{58}	Adam Robert Quade (born 1987), 2002 DCYSC finalist. He attended the St. John the Baptist School, New Brighton, Minnesota.	JPL · 13434
13435 Rohret	1999 VX_{67}	Sasha Annalicia Rohret (born 1989), 2002 DCYSC finalist. She attended the Keystone Junior High School, San Antonio, Texas.	JPL · 13435
13436 Enid	1999 WF	Enid, a city in northern Oklahoma.	JPL · 13436
13437 Wellton-Persson	1999 WF_{8}	Helen Wellton (born 1961) and Claes Wellton Persson (born 1943) are Swedish entrepreneurs whose interest in minor planets and comets has resulted in generous support and sponsorship for the Uppsala-DLR Asteroid Survey. The name was suggested by G. Hahn.	JPL · 13437
13438 Marthanalexander	1999 XD_{86}	Martha N. Alexander, 2001 DCYSC mentor. Alexander is a teacher at the All Saints Episcopal School, Lubbock, Texas.	JPL · 13438
13439 Frankiethomas	2072 P-L	Frankie Thomas (1921–2006), an American actor who played cadet Tom Corbett in the 1950s TV series "Tom Corbett, Space Cadet". He was a fine role model for all children watching the show and believed that science was good and improved the quality of our lives. He had many movie credits before Tom Corbett.	JPL · 13439
13441 Janmerlin	2098 P-L	Jan Merlin (born 1925), an American actor who played cadet Roger Manning in the 1950 TV series "Tom Corbett, Space Cadet". He was the astronavigator on the rocket ship's radar deck and was always on the lookout for asteroids and comets.	JPL · 13441
13446 Almarkim	3087 P-L	Al Markim (1927–2015), an American actor who played cadet Astro in the 1950 TV series "Tom Corbett, Space Cadet". His role on the rocketship Polaris was to control the engines on the power deck. Besides acting in many early TV shows, he co-produced some early TV series.	JPL · 13446
13448 Edbryce	4526 P-L	Ed Bryce (1921–1999), an American actor who played Captain Steve Strong in the 1950s TV series "Tom Corbett, Space Cadet". He led the crew of cadets. Ed Bryce contributed to the meteoric growth of early television and was featured in numerous shows.	JPL · 13448
13449 Margaretgarland	4845 P-L	Margaret Garland (born 1921), an American actor who played Dr. Joan Dale in the 1950 TV series "Tom Corbett, Space Cadet". In one episode she went with the cadets to an asteroid mine. She appeared earlier in a number of Broadway plays and later became a nurse.	JPL · 13449
13463 Antiphos	5159 T-2	Antiphos, a friend of Telemachos and Odysseus and lived at Ithaca.	JPL · 13463
13473 Hokema	1953 GJ	Peter Hokema (born 1955), a German violinist and maker of musical instruments.	JPL · 13473
13474 Vʹyus	1973 QO_{1}	Yurij Sergeevich Vasilʹev (born 1929), rector of St. Petersburg State Technical University.	JPL · 13474
13475 Orestes	1973 SX	Orestes, a son of Agamemnon, was a child at the time of the murder of his father.	MPC · 13475
13476 Pepesales	1974 QF	José Luis “Pepe” Sales, Argentine physicist and professor.	IAU · 13476
13477 Utkin	1975 VW_{5}	Vladimir Utkin (1923–2000), a Russian engineer and scientist, was the designer of numerous carrier rockets and spacecraft. He was chair of Russia's Advisory Expert Council, which conducted joint assessments of the safety of Shuttle-Mir missions together with the Thomas P. Stafford Council.	JPL · 13477
13478 Fraunhofer	1976 DB_{1}	Joseph von Fraunhofer (1787–1826), a German autodidact, glassmaker, optician and scientist, had an uncommon talent. He improved the telescope, invented the diffraction grid, and measured the wavelengths of the absorption lines in the solar spectrum. In 1824 the Bavarian king elevated him to the nobility.	JPL · 13478
13479 Vet	1977 TO_{6}	Vladimir Evgen'evich Tretyakov ("VET", born 1936), a Russian mathematician, is a co-author of the Repin-Tretyakov method for the stabilization of dynamical systems. As rector he provides unceasing support for the development of astronomy at the Ural University and for the annual Student Winter Astronomical School.	JPL · 13479
13480 Potapov	1978 PX_{3}	Mikhail Mikhailovich Potapov (born 1904) is a distinctive Russian painter who made a series of icon works in the twelfth-century Byzantine manner for several temples.	JPL · 13480
13481 Aubele	1978 VM_{11}	Jayne C. Aubele (b. 1949), an American geologist and planetary scientist	IAU · 13481
13482 Igorfedorov	1979 HN_{5}	Igor Borisovich Fedorov (born 1940) is a prominent scientist in the field of radio-wave propagation and over-the-horizon radar and is the author of more than 180 scientific publications. He has worked at the Bauman Moscow State Technical University since 1963 and has been rector since 1991.	JPL · 13482
13484 Jinnylin	1981 EA_{16}	Jinny Lin (b. 1978), a Taiwanese-American veterinarian	IAU · 13484
13486 Morgangibson	1981 UT_{29}	Morgan S. Gibson (1951–2022) studied bone loss in astronauts in the 1970s. She was lead editor for the book Impact and Explosion Cratering: Planetary and Terrestrial Implications, and technical editor for the 7th and 8th Lunar Science Conference and Comparison of Mercury and the Moon Conference proceedings.	IAU · 13486
13487 Novosyadlyj	1981 VN	Ukrainian astronomer Bodhan S. Novosyadlyj.	IAU · 13487
13488 Savanov	1982 TK_{1}	Igor Spartakovich Savanov (born 1956), the vice-director of the Crimean Astrophysical Observatory.	JPL · 13488
13489 Dmitrienko	1982 UO_{6}	Elena Sergeevna Dmitrienko (born 1952), a senior researcher at the Crimean Astrophysical Observatory and wife of astronomer Igor' Savanov.	JPL · 13489
13490 Allanchapman	1984 BZ_{6}	Allan Chapman, eminent British historian, and a world-renowned authority on the history of science.	IAU · 13490
13492 Vitalijzakharov	1984 YE_{4}	Vitalij Aleksandrovich Zakharov (born 1964) is an active surgeon-oncologist at the Simferopol cancer dispensary center.	JPL · 13492
13493 Lockwood	1985 PT	George W. ("Wes") Lockwood (born 1941), an astronomer at Lowell Observatory since 1973, is an expert on high-precision photometry. Central to his research has been a decades-long study of the seasonal variability of Saturn VI (Titan), Uranus, and Neptune, as well as activity cycles in the sun and solar-type stars	JPL · 13493
13494 Treiso	1985 RT	Treiso is a village near Alba, Piemonte. Each year, a day is set aside to celebrate both astronomy and the locally produced red wine, Barbaresco. The event is called "Tasting the Universe". The name was suggested by V. Zappalà and A. W. Harris	JPL · 13494
13497 Ronstone	1986 EK_{1}	Ronald C. Stone (born 1946) joined the U.S. Naval Observatory in 1981, working in Washington D.C., in New Zealand and at Flagstaff Station in Arizona. He developed the Flagstaff Astrometric Scanning Transit Telescope (FASTT) and obtained extremely accurate positions for thousands of minor planets.	JPL · 13497
13498 Al Chwarizmi	1986 PX	Al Chwarizmi (c.~780-c.~850), a Persian mathematician, astronomer and geographer.	JPL · 13498
13499 Steinberg	1986 TQ_{5}	Jean Louis Steinberg (born 1922) is a co-founder of the Nançay Radio Observatory and Astronomy and Astrophysics. He was among the first in France to launch space-astronomy missions using sounding rockets and satellites to study the physics of ionospheric plasma and the terrestrial magnetosphere.	JPL · 13499
13500 Viscardy	1987 PM	Georges Viscardy (born 1917), the founder of the Société Monégasque d´Astronomie and of the Observatoire de Saint Martin de Peille on the French Riviera.	JPL · 13500

== 13501–13600 ==
back to top

Named minor planet	Provisional	This minor planet was named for...	Ref; Catalog
13509 Guayaquil	1989 GU_{3}	Guayaquil, the largest and the most populated city in Ecuador	JPL · 13509
13513 Manila	1990 EL_{2}	Manila, the capital of the Philippines, with a capital region of about 12 million inhabitants.	JPL · 13513
13514 Mikerudenko	1990 MR	Michael Rudenko (born 1955) has been an IT specialist at the Minor Planet Center, handling the website and database, since 2009. He (co-)discovered three comets visually: C/1984 V1 (Levy-Rudenko); C/1987 Q1 (Rudenko); and C/1989 Q1 (Okazaki-Levy-Rudenko)	JPL · 13514
13520 Félicienrops	1990 VC_{6}	Félicien Rops, Belgian painter	JPL · 13520
13523 Vanhassel	1991 LU_{1}	André Vanhassel (born 1927) studied classical philology at Ghent University and philosophy at the Université libre de Bruxelles. He was the director of the Lyceum in Antwerp from 1980 to 1985.	JPL · 13523
13525 Paulledoux	1991 PG_{3}	Paul Ledoux (1914–1988), was a Belgian astrophysicist, who was awarded the Francqui Prize for Exact Sciences in 1964. For his investigations into problems of stellar stability and variable stars he was awarded the Janssen Medal of the French Academy of Sciences in 1976. Name suggested by Jean Meeus.	JPL · 13525
13526 Libbrecht	1991 PQ_{5}	Ulrich Libbrecht (1928–2017), was a Belgian philosopher and authority in the field of Eastern and comparative philosophy. He studied sinology at the University of Ghent and became professor of sinology at the University of Leiden. His book With the Four Seas is a well-known introduction to comparative philosophy.	JPL · 13526
13529 Yokaboshi	1991 RE_{1}	Yokaboshi is a local astronomical group established at Baloon Yoka Astronomical Observatory in 1992 in collaboration with the local government.	JPL · 13529
13530 Ninnemann	1991 RS_{2}	Olaf Ninnemann (born 1947), German mathematician and leading expert in the field of information and documentation, is especially interested in number theory. He played a key role in the establishment of the Zentralblatt für Mathematik and has been its executive editor since 1978.	JPL · 13530
13531 Weizsäcker	1991 RU_{4}	Carl Friedrich von Weizsäcker (1912–2007), German physicist and philosopher, was involved in nuclear physics, quantum theory and astronomy. Together with H. Bethe, he explained the radiation energy of stars by processes of nuclear fusion. He also developed a theory for the formation of the Solar System.	JPL · 13531
13533 Junili	1991 RJ_{11}	June (1985), Nina (1987) and Lian (1988) daughters of psychologist Theo Geuens and Rita Heirman, both friends of the discoverer, Eric Walter Elst. They are majoring in sociology, mathematics and childhood education, respectively.	JPL · 13533
13534 Alain-Fournier	1991 RZ_{11}	Alain-Fournier (Henri-Alban Fournier, 1886–1914) was a French novelist and literary critic. In 1913 he published his novel Le Grand Meaulnes, which was widely admired and became a classic in French literature	JPL · 13534
13540 Kazukitakahashi	1991 UR_{1}	Kazuki Takahashi (born 1997) is the eldest son of the first discoverer, Atsushi Takahashi.	JPL · 13540
13543 Butler	1992 AO_{2}	John Christopher "Chris" Butler (born 1964), a prolific astronomical artist who has painted numerous scenes incorporating fine details and color in works like Apollo Dawn and a sense of humor reflected in such paintings as One Small Mistake for Man and Hooray for Hadleywood.	JPL · 13543
13551 Gadsden	1992 FL_{1}	Michael Gadsden (1933–2003) worked during the International Geophysical Year on airglow and aurorae in New Zealand and Antarctica and later at Boulder and Aberdeen. He was an authority on noctilucent clouds and secretary general of the International Association of Geomagnetism and Aeronomy.	JPL · 13551
13553 Masaakikoyama	1992 JE	Masaaki Koyama (born 1934), Japanese baseball player, was known for his superb ball control and was called "a precision throwing machine". Since retiring, he has been active as a coach, baseball commentator and critic. He was inducted into Japan's Baseball Hall of Fame in 2001.	JPL · 13553
13554 Decleir	1992 JL_{1}	Hugo Decleir (born 1939) is Professor Emeritus in the geography department of the University of Brussels whose research interests include glaciology and climatology. He participated in several expeditions to Antarctica and is a co-founder of the International Polar Foundation	JPL · 13554
13557 Lievetruwant	1992 OB_{9}	Godelieva Truwant (born 1948), a mathematics teacher at Institute Stella Matutina in Michelbeke, Belgium, has for more than 35 years been the encouraging supporter of the astronomical career of her husband, C. Sterken.	JPL · 13557
13559 Werth	1992 RD_{1}	Hildegard Werth (born 1950), an experienced TV journalist with the large German TV system ZDF.	JPL · 13559
13560 La Pérouse	1992 RX_{6}	Jean-François de Galaup, comte de Lapérouse (1741–1788), a French navigator sailed along the coast of South and North America and across the Pacific to China and Australia in 1785. In 1788, his ships L´Astrolabe and La Boussole vanished without a trace. The strait between Hokkaido and Sakhalin is named for him.	JPL · 13560
13561 Kudogou	1992 SB_{1}	Gou Kudo (born 1954) is a high school science teacher and amateur astronomer. A director of the Kuroishi Subaru Association, he is also on the editorial staff of the association's magazine Starlit Sky Information and works vigorously to promote knowledge of astronomy	JPL · 13561
13562 Bobeggleton	1992 SF_{11}	Bob Eggleton (born 1960) is a world-renowned artist whose work spans science, science fiction and fantasy.	JPL · 13562
13564 Kodomomiraikan	1992 UH_{1}	Kodomomiraikan ("Museum of Future for Kids") is a hands-on-activity-based center for children that will open in 2010 in Edogawa, Tokyo. This facility will provide an opportunity for kids to continue to learn various subjects, including astronomy, the universe, manufacturing and nature	JPL · 13564
13565 Yotakanashi	1992 UZ_{5}	Yoichi Takanashi (born 1958) is an amateur astronomer and owner of a very famous Italian restaurant in Kamogawa City, and he entertains many a visitor coming to see him from Tokyo. He is also a vice director of the Kamogawa Lifesaving Club and contributes much to his community	JPL · 13565
13567 Urabe	1992 WF_{1}	Mamoru Urabe (born 1960), a teacher of junior high school and an amateur astronomer, is a volunteer senior researcher at the Kamogawa Observatory in Chiba prefecture and has a private observatory in his home. His astronomical interests include comets, nebulae, star clusters and occultations by minor planets	JPL · 13567
13569 Oshu	1993 EJ	Ōshū, a Japanese city is situated in the southern inland region of Iwate prefecture. It was formed on 2006 Feb. 20 as an amalgamation of five Japanese cities and towns. The Mizusawa Astrogeodynamics Observatory is located in the new city.	JPL · 13569
13576 Gotoyoshi	1993 HW	Yoshihiro Goto (born 1955) is a local civil servant and a Japanese amateur astronomer. As a member of the secretariat of the Kuroishi Subaru Association, he is active in organizing star parties for amateur astronomers and lay persons	JPL · 13576
13577 Ukawa	1993 HR_{1}	Hirohumi Ukawa (born 1942) mentored many an astronomical amateur and astronomy specialist by the time of his retirement from many years of distinguished services at the Takamatsu Municipal Planetarium. He also acted as the volunteer president of the Astronomical Society of Shikoku during his tenure	JPL · 13577
13579 Allodd	1993 NA_{2}	The number of this minor planet consists of all odd digits, in increasing order. The name was suggested by Jean Meeus.	JPL · 13579
13580 de Saussure	1993 OQ_{5}	Swiss aristocrat and physicist Horace Bénédict de Saussure (1770–1799) made several journeys through the Swiss Alps, directing his attention to its botany, mineralogy, geology and topography of the snowy mountains. This naming also honors the linguist Ferdinand de Saussure (1857–1913)	JPL · 13580
13582 Tominari	1993 TN_{2}	Ichiro Tominari (born 1955), a prefectural government official, is also well known as an amateur astronomer in Oita. He began studying cosmic rays during his days as a university student and later became interested in galactic astronomy. He is now a planning director of the Astronomical Society of Oita	JPL · 13582
13583 Bosret	1993 TN_{18}	Nicolas Bosret (1799–1876) was a blind composer and organist at the Cathedral St. Loup in Namur. In 1851 he composed Li Bia Bouquèt, which became the official hymn of the city.	JPL · 13583
13585 Justinsmith	1993 TC_{20}	Justin E. H. Smith (born 1972) is an American-Canadian philosopher, at present a professor in the Department of Philosophy and Sciences at Diderot University, Paris. His recent book Nature, Human Nature and Human Difference (2015) is a collection of philosophical essays.	JPL · 13585
13586 Copenhagen	1993 TY_{22}	Founded as a fishing village in the 10th century, Copenhagen became the capital of Denmark in the early 15th century. The name is derived from `merchants harbour'. Excavations have led to the discovery of a well from the late 12th century, and the remains of an ancient church, with graves dating from the 11th century.	JPL · 13586
13599 Lisbon	1994 PM_{21}	One of the oldest cities in the world, Lisbon was inhabited by pre-Celtic tribes during the Neolithic period. In 711 the city was taken by Berbers and Arabs from North Africa and the Middle East. Muslim influences are still visible in the Alfama district that survived the 1755 Lisbon earthquake.	JPL · 13599

== 13601–13700 ==
back to top

Named minor planet	Provisional	This minor planet was named for...	Ref; Catalog
13602 Pierreboulez	1994 PB_{36}	Pierre Boulez (1925-2016) was a French composer, conductor and pianist. As a child he showed a great aptitude for music and mathematics. He discovered the twelve-tone technique and wrote atonic music in a post-Weberian style.	JPL · 13602
13605 Nakamuraminoru	1994 RV	Minoru Nakamura (born 1931) has been an active volunteer in the spread of astronomical knowledge and activities for children and youth since his retirement as principal of an elementary school in Kuroishi, Aomori prefecture. He has been president of the Kuroishi Subaru Association since 1992	JPL · 13605
13606 Bean	1994 RN_{5}	Alan Bean (1932–2018) an American astronaut, became the fourth person to set foot on the lunar surface during the Apollo 12 mission to Oceanus Procellarum. After leaving the space program, he had devoted himself to documenting his and his fellow astronauts' experiences through his spectacular artwork.	JPL · 13606
13607 Vicars	1994 SH_{11}	Andrea Vicars (born 1974), an engineer with a wide range of skills.	JPL · 13607
13608 Andosatoru	1994 TQ_{1}	Satoru Ando (born 1954) has for many years been a passionate disseminator of astronomy as chairman of the Tateyama Astronomy Club in Chiba prefecture. He is also known as a beachcomber	JPL · 13608
13609 Lewicki	1994 TK_{11}	Christopher A. Lewicki (born 1974), an engineer working at the Jet Propulsion Laboratory.	JPL · 13609
13610 Lilienthal	1994 TS_{16}	Otto Lilienthal (1848–1896), a German engineer who explored the aerodynamics of the flight of birds. Beginning in 1891, he flew more than 2000 times with homemade gliders, with his last flight ending in a fatal crash. With his brother Gustav (1849–1933), he conducted experiments that provided important knowledge about flight.	JPL · 13610
13615 Manulis	1994 WP_{13}	Ilan Manulis (born 1949) has enthusiastically promoted the study of near-earth objects from Israel and built awareness among the public by lectures and media programs. During the 1980s, he was chairman of the Israeli Astronomical Association. He now serves as IAA's head of small solar-system objects.	JPL · 13615
13620 Moynahan	1995 FM_{3}	Dan Moynahan (born 1971), a computer programmer working at the University of Arizona's Lunar and Planetary Laboratory.	JPL · 13620
13622 McArthur	1995 HY_{2}	Guy McArthur (born 1971), a talented programmer working at the University of Arizona's Lunar and Planetary Laboratory.	JPL · 13622
13623 Seanwalker	1995 TD	Sean Walker (born 1971), American artist, astrophotographer, and Sky & Telescope editor.	JPL · 13623
13624 Abeosamu	1995 UO_{3}	Osamu Abe (born 1950), Japanese amateur astronomer and a researcher on snow and ice.	JPL · 13624
13627 Yukitamayo	1995 VP_{1}	Tamayo Yuki (born 1956) joined the Fukuoka Astronomical Society and actively participates in their regular meetings. After her marriage, she built a private observatory in her back yard. She enjoys observing and photographing nebulae and star clusters through her 0.3-m Schmidt Cassegrain telescope	JPL · 13627
13633 Ivens	1995 WW_{17}	John Ivens (born 1964), a computer programmer working at the University of Arizona's Lunar and Planetary Laboratory.	JPL · 13633
13638 Fiorenza	1996 CJ_{7}	Fiorenza Tombelli (born 1950), a sister of the first discoverer.	JPL · 13638
13640 Ohtateruaki	1996 GV_{1}	Teruaki Ohta (born 1962) is a Japanese amateur astronomer and director of the Astronomical Society of Oita. His current main interests are comets, meteors, planetary occultations, lunar eclipses and solar eclipses. He also enjoys touring domestic and overseas astronomical observatories	JPL · 13640
13641 de Lesseps	1996 GM_{20}	Jean-Baptiste de Lesseps (1766–1834), a French diplomat and writer, was a member of the scientific expedition of La Pérouse. Reaching the port of Avatcha (Kamchatka) on 1787 Sept. 30, he was transported over land by horses and sledges to get the reports of the voyage so far to Paris. This took him more than one year	JPL · 13641
13642 Ricci	1996 HX	Gregorio Ricci-Curbastro (1853–1925), a professor of mathematics at the University of Padua.	JPL · 13642
13643 Takushi	1996 HC_{1}	Takushi Yokota (born 1958), Japanese leader of the Kobe University astronomy club (see 13176 Kobedaitenken, above) and observing partner of the discoverer	JPL · 13643
13644 Lynnanderson	1996 HR_{10}	Lynn Anderson (1947–2015), a multi-award-winning American country music singer, had a worldwide hit in 1970 with I Never Promised You a Rose Garden	JPL · 13644
13647 Rey	1996 HR_{24}	Marc-Michel Rey (1720–1780) was a major figure in the publishing history of the Enlightenment in Amsterdam from 1744 onward. Manuscripts were smuggled out of France and found their way to Amsterdam, where they were printed and brought back to France clandestinely.	JPL · 13647
13650 Perimedes	1996 TN_{49}	Perimedes from Greek mythology. He was the father of Schedius, the commander of the Phocians who was killed by Hector on the battlefield of Troy.	JPL · 13650
13652 Elowitz	1997 BV_{8}	Mark Elowitz (born 1961) is a space scientist with a wide range of experience. He contributed to the Voyager survey of the outer solar system, the Magellan mission to Venus, Project LINEAR and the Galileo survey of the Jupiter system	JPL · 13652
13653 Priscus	1997 CT_{16}	Tarquinius Priscus, fifth king of Rome, reigned from 616 to 579 B.C. He constructed the Circus Maximus and enlarged the Roman Forum	JPL · 13653
13654 Masuda	1997 CV_{21}	Masuda is an area in Tanegashima, Kagoshima prefecture, where one can enjoy a great ocean view. The Masuda Tracking and Communication Station of the Japan Aerospace Exploration Agency is located on the cliff to conduct command operations and receive telemetry from satellites that observe the earth or the moon	JPL · 13654
13657 Badinter	1997 EB_{54}	Elisabeth Badinter (Bleustein-Blanchet, b. 1944) is a French author, feminist and philosopher. Specializing in the eighteenth-century Enlightenment literature, she became famous for L´amour en plus (1980), where she defends the rights of women and proclaims the resemblances between men and women	JPL · 13657
13658 Sylvester	1997 FB	James Joseph Sylvester (1814–1897) studied at Cambridge and was the founder, together with Cayley, of the theory of algebraic invariants. He taught at University College, London; at Johns Hopkins University (1877–1883), where he helped establish a graduate program in mathematics; and finally at Oxford	JPL · 13658
13667 Samthurman	1997 GT_{37}	Sam Thurman (born 1961) led a team that helped develop the landing system for Mars Pathfinder that was key in proving that the landing approach would perform reliably on Mars. This used a Monte Carlo computer simulation that accurately modeled the spacecraft and its interaction with the Martian environment	JPL · 13667
13668 Tanner	1997 HQ_{1}	Roger Tanner (born 1950) has spent the last eight years at the University of Arizona's Lunar and Planetary Laboratory designing and building imaging systems for use on the various Mars missions, such as Mars Pathfinder, Beagle II and HiRISE. He is also an avid amateur astronomer who aspires to work at a professional level	JPL · 13668
13669 Swammerdam	1997 JS_{14}	Jan Swammerdam (1637–1680), one of the first entomologists to use the microscope to study insects.	JPL · 13669
13672 Tarski	1997 KH	Alfred Tarski (1901–1983), Polish logician, mathematician and philosopher, best known for his work on model theory, metamathematics, and algebraic logic	JPL · 13672
13673 Urysohn	1997 LC	Pavel Samuilovich Urysohn (1898–1924), Russian mathematician mainly active in topology	JPL · 13673
13674 Bourge	1997 MJ_{2}	Pierre Bourge (born 1921) founded what was later to become the Association Française d´Astronomie in 1945, and its magazine Ciel et Espace in 1972. An avid solar eclipse observer and telescope maker, he has been an inspiration to a generation of astronomers, amateur and professional	JPL · 13674
13677 Alvin	1997 NK_{1}	Alvin is a deep-sea submersible with a depth range of 4000 meters. Built in 1964, it was used for some of the greatest undersea adventures of all, including the recovery of a lost nuclear device, the mapping of the Mid-Ocean Ridge and the discovery of "black smoker chimneys" and associated tube worms	JPL · 13677
13678 Shimada	1997 NE_{11}	Osamu Shimada (born 1914) is a professor emeritus in science at Yamagata University. He is now a researcher and instructor of science teaching	JPL · 13678
13679 Shinanogawa	1997 OZ_{1}	Shinanogawa is the river that flows from Nagano prefecture to Niigata prefecture and into the Sea of Japan. The longest river in Japan, it has a total length of 367 kilometers	JPL · 13679
13680 Katyafrantseva	1997 PY	Ukrainian astronomer Kateryna ("Katya") Frantseva (born 1991) has advanced our understanding of how asteroids, comets and dust affect planetary surfaces in the Solar System and beyond.	IAU · 13680
13681 Monty Python	1997 PY_{1}	Monty Python's Flying Circus, a comedy show starring Graham Chapman, John Cleese, Eric Idle, Michael Palin and Terry Jones, aired on the BBC from 1969 Oct. 5 to 1974 Dec. 5. It also featured animations by Terry Gilliam.	JPL · 13681
13682 Pressberger	1997 PG_{3}	Rudolf Pressberger (1942–2001), an Austrian engineer and astronomer, invented an improved telescope fork mount, named the "Austria Mount". First released in 1986, it features a right-ascension axis built inside the fork, works without ball bearings and uses friction drives. Using this design, Pressberger also built a 1.0-m Ritchey-Chrétien telescope himself.	JPL · 13682
13684 Borbona	1997 QQ_{2}	Borbona is a picturesque town in the Italian region Lazio, famous for works of art that include a twelfth-century cross in gold and silver	JPL · 13684
13686 Kongozan	1997 QS_{4}	Kongozan mountain (height 583 meters) is located in the east of Shirataka town, Yamagata prefecture. The mountain is in the discoverer's hometown	JPL · 13686
13688 Oklahoma	1997 RJ_{7}	Oklahoma is a U.S. state, and this was the first minor planet to be discovered from an observatory there.	JPL · 13688
13689 Succi	1997 RO_{7}	Carlo Succi (1919–2000), was an Italian professor of physics at the University of Milan, was also director of the local section of the Istituto Nazionale di Fisica Nucleare. His interests ranged from a pioneering study of cosmic rays to the development of the Milan 50-MeV cyclotron.	JPL · 13689
13690 Lesleymartin	1997 RG_{9}	Lesley and Martin Goldsmith took care of the discoverer, Thierry Pauwels, after he had an accident in Savernake Forest, Wiltshire, England	JPL · 13690
13691 Akie	1997 SL_{16}	Akie Asami (born 1957) is the wife of the discoverer, Atsuo Asami.	JPL · 13691
13693 Bondar	1997 TW_{15}	Roberta Bondar (born 1945), selected as a Canadian astronaut in 1983, flew on space shuttle mission STS-42 and has inspired the interest of young Canadians in science.	JPL · 13693
13699 Nickthomas	1998 MU_{7}	Nicholas Thomas (born 1960), German scientist at Max Planck Institute for Solar System Research (Aeronomics), Katlenburg-Lindau, has been associated with obtaining close-up images of Solar System bodies, from his role on the Giotto multicolor camera, through the imager on Mars Pathfinder, to Rosetta's OSIRIS imager	JPL · 13699
13700 Connors	1998 MM_{36}	Martin Connors (born 1954), a Canadian astronomer and associate professor at Athabasca University since 1996, was appointed Canada Research Chair in Space Science, Instrumentation and Networking in 2002.	JPL · 13700

== 13701–13800 ==
back to top

Named minor planet	Provisional	This minor planet was named for...	Ref; Catalog
13701 Roquebrune	1998 OR	Roquebrune-sur-Argens, Provençal village organizing a "Night of Stars"	JPL · 13701
13703 Romero	1998 OR_{13}	Óscar Romero (1917–1980), was an archbishop in El Salvador. During his mission he actively denounced violations of the human rights of the most vulnerable populations and promoted opposition to all forms of violence.	MPC · 13703
13704 Aletesi	1998 PA_{1}	Alessandro Tesi, is the younger son of the discoverer, the Italian amateur astronomer Luciano Tesi.	MPC · 13704
13705 Llapasset	1998 QJ_{2}	Jean-Marie Llapasset is a highly active French amateur astronomer. His main interest is the CCD observation of supernovae, and he is responsible for the coordination of measuring supernova magnitudes within the Association des Utilisateurs de Détecteurs Electroniques.	JPL · 13705
13710 Shridhar	1998 QU_{13}	Nupur Shridhar (born 1989), 2002 DCYSC finalist. She attends the Great Valley Middle School, Malvern, Pennsylvania,	JPL · 13710
13714 Stainbrook	1998 QV_{38}	Haileigh Kate Stainbrook (born 1989), 2002 DCYSC finalist. She attends the Fairmont Elementary, Sanger, California.	MPC · 13714
13715 Steed	1998 QK_{39}	Jared Benjamin Steed (born 1988), 2002 DCYSC finalist. He attends the Buckeye Valley Middle School, Delaware, Ohio.	JPL · 13715
13716 Trevino	1998 QJ_{40}	Aron Michael Trevino (born 1990), 2002 DCYSC finalist. He attends the Jackson Middle School, San Antonio, Texas	JPL · 13716
13717 Vencill	1998 QM_{42}	Kory Aaron Vencill (born 1988), 2002 DCYSC finalist. He attends the Applegate Middle School, Applegate, Oregon.	JPL · 13717
13718 Welcker	1998 QR_{43}	Kelydra Elizabeth Welcker (born 1989), 2002 DCYSC finalist. She attends the Blennerhassett Junior High, Parkersburg, West Virginia	JPL · 13718
13721 Kevinwelsh	1998 QX_{51}	Kevin William Welsh (born 1988), 2002 DCYSC finalist. He attended the St. Peter Chanel Interparochial School, Paulina, Louisiana.	JPL · 13721
13722 Campobagatin	1998 QO_{54}	Adriano Campo Bagatin (born 1962), of the University of Bern, has worked on the observation of transneptunian objects, the collisional evolution of minor planets and the physics of small-body fragmentation processes. The name was suggested by P. Paolicchi	JPL · 13722
13723 Kolokolova	1998 QY_{54}	Ludmilla Kolokolova (born 1951) is a scientist at the University of Florida, Gainesville. Her research centers on light scattering by particles and by the surfaces of solar-system bodies. The name was suggested by H. Scholl	JPL · 13723
13724 Schwehm	1998 QF_{55}	Gerhard Schwehm (born 1949), a German physicist and head of the Planetary Missions Division of ESA-ESTEC, Noordwijk, and Project Scientist for the Rosetta Mission. He has worked mainly on the dynamical and physical properties of interplanetary dust particles. The name was suggested by H. Scholl.	JPL · 13724
13729 Nicolewen	1998 RO_{22}	Nicole J. Wen (born 1989), 2002 DCYSC finalist. She attends the Keystone Junior High School, San Antonio, Texas.	JPL · 13729
13730 Willis	1998 RE_{47}	Emily Kathleen Willis (born 1988), 2002 DCYSC finalist. She attends the Rocky Mountain Middle School, Heber, Utah.	JPL · 13730
13732 Woodall	1998 RC_{56}	Ashley Renee Woodall (born 1987), 2002 DCYSC finalist. She attends the Austin Academy for Excellence, Garland, Texas.	JPL · 13732
13733 Dylanyoung	1998 RA_{59}	Dylan Howard Young (born 1988), 2002 DCYSC finalist. He attended the Hastings Middle School, Upper Arlington, Ohio.	JPL · 13733
13734 Buklad	1998 RC_{66}	Naomi Buklad, 2002 DCYSC mentor. She teaches at the Altamont School, Birmingham, Alabama.	JPL · 13734
13739 Nancyworden	1998 SW_{1}	Nancy Worden, now retired, had a distinguished career as a technical librarian. She served as chief librarian at the U.S. National Solar Observatory. She began the use of computer-based databases in several U.S. government and commercial space programs. The citation was provided by her husband, S. P. Worden	JPL · 13739
13740 Lastrucci	1998 SL_{2}	Liliana Lastrucci (born 1948) is wife of the second discoverer	JPL · 13740
13743 Rivkin	1998 SX_{23}	Andrew S. Rivkin (born 1969), of the Massachusetts Institute of Technology, has wide-ranging interests, including 3- μ m observations of minor planets, Saturn's rings, stellar dust disks, science education, the moons of Mars and oblique impacts. He has also contributed to NEAR, Deep Space-1, ISO, MUSES-C and Rosetta.	JPL · 13743
13744 Rickline	1998 SY_{25}	Rick Kline (born 1953) has been Data Manager of the Spacecraft Planetary Imaging Facility at Cornell University since 1987. Kline has provided imaging data for planetary and small body research, and has educated thousands of young space advocates in his educational outreach programs. The name was suggested by B. E. Clark	JPL · 13744
13745 Mikecosta	1998 SL_{42}	Mike Costa (born 1954) is a Canadian amateur astronomer with wide-ranging observing interests, which he pursues with a 0.25-m Newtonian telescope. Costa has been an enthusiastic supporter of the activities of the Royal Astronomical Society of Canada, London Centre.	JPL · 13745
13748 Radaly	1998 SC_{46}	Reginald Aldworth Daly (1871–1957), a Canadian geologist who was president of the Geological Society of America in 1932. He wrote on subjects such as the glacial control of coral reefs and rock mechanics.	JPL · 13748
13750 Mattdawson	1998 ST_{54}	Matthew Dawson (born 1959), of Roeser, Luxembourg, is an active amateur involved in the astrometry of fast-moving NEOs using a 45-cm telescope. Dawson is also a musician who specializes in contemporary jazz and popular music. He recorded a hit song in Germany in 1991. The name was suggested by R. A. Kowalski	JPL · 13750
13751 Joelparker	1998 SS_{55}	Joel W. Parker (born 1962), American astronomer and discoverer of minor planets. He works at the Southwest Research Institute, Boulder, Colorado, and specializes in the study of Kuiper belt objects. He is editor of the periodical Distant EKOs.	JPL · 13751
13752 Grantstokes	1998 SF_{58}	Grant H. Stokes (born 1959) is principal investigator of the Lincoln Near-Earth Asteroid Research (LINEAR), the most prolific asteroid and comet discovery program, which is currently responsible for about 70% of all small bodies found worldwide	JPL · 13752
13753 Jennivirta	1998 SY_{59}	Jenni V. Virtanen (born 1975), of the University of Helsinki, specializes in orbit determination. She has recently developed an initial orbit determination method, termed statistical ranging, suitable for use on poorly observed or short-arc objects.	JPL · 13753
13760 Rodriguez	1998 SN_{123}	Maria Rodriguez mentored a finalist in the 2002 Discovery Channel Youth Science Challenge (DCYSC), a middle school science competition. She teaches at the Arvida Middle School, Miami, Florida	JPL · 13760
13761 Dorristaylor	1998 SA_{130}	Dorris Taylor mentored a finalist in the 2002 Discovery Channel Youth Science Challenge (DCYSC), a middle school science competition. She teaches at the Dunbar Middle School, Fort Worth, Texas	JPL · 13761
13764 Mcalanis	1998 SW_{135}	Edith McAlanis mentored a finalist in the 2002 Discovery Channel Youth Science Challenge (DCYSC), a middle school science competition. She teaches at the Barbara Bush Middle School, San Antonio, Texas	JPL · 13764
13765 Nansmith	1998 SM_{138}	Nancy Smith mentored a finalist in the 2002 Discovery Channel Youth Science Challenge (DCYSC), a middle school science competition. She teaches at the Harry F. Byrd Middle School, Richmond, Virginia	JPL · 13765
13766 Bonham	1998 SA_{139}	Dan Bonham mentored a finalist in the 2002 Discovery Channel Youth Science Challenge (DCYSC), a middle school science competition. He teaches at the Hillsboro High School, Hillsboro, North Dakota	JPL · 13766
13770 Commerson	1998 ST_{145}	Philibert Commerson (1727–1773) was a French naturalist, botanist and explorer. In 1764 he joined Bougainville on the frigate Boudeuse to circumnavigate the world. Near Rio de Janeiro he found a vivid colorful vine, which upon his suggestion was named Bougainvillea by the French botanist de Jussieu.	JPL · 13770
13772 Livius	1998 SV_{163}	Livy (59 BC – AD 17), a Roman historian known for the 142 books of his Ab urbe condita ("From the Founding of the City"). Only Books 1–10 and 21–45 have survived. The famous defeat by Hannibal of the Roman forces under Flaminius at the battle of Trasimeno Lake is described in Book 22., Roman historian	JPL · 13772
13774 Spurný	1998 TW_{30}	Pavel Spurný (born 1958), of the Astronomical Institute of the Academy of Sciences of the Czech Republic, leads the European Network for photographing bolides. He is well known for his work in meteor physics and astronomy and has published many precise trajectories and orbits of bolides. The name was suggested by Z. Ceplecha.	JPL · 13774
13775 Thébault	1998 TL_{32}	Philippe Thébault (born 1969), French planetary scientist at Paris Observatory and expert on the dynamics of small Solar System bodies. He has worked on the planetesimal accretion of planetary systems and collisions in the Kuiper Belt.	MPC · 13775
13777 Cielobuio	1998 UV_{6}	CieloBuio is the Italian association against light pollution. Cielobuio played a fundamental role in Lombardy to support the passage of a regional law, one of the most advanced in the world. Through its electronic mailing list, Cielobuio connects both amateur and professional astronomers.	JPL · 13777
13787 Nagaishi	1998 UN_{23}	Nagaishi city, situated in the southern part of Yamagata prefecture, has a population of 30~000 and is famous for its White azalea Park and Iris Park	JPL · 13787
13788 Dansolander	1998 UY_{26}	Daniel Solander (1733–1782), a Swedish botanist, who joined James Cook on the Endeavour, the ship that was sent by the Royal Society to the South Seas to observe the June 1769 transit of Venus. During this voyage he collected about a thousand different species of plants, none of which was then known in Europe.	JPL · 13788
13792 Kuščynskyj	1998 VG	Taras Kuščynskyj (1932–1983) was a Czech photographer, known for his beautiful black-and-white images of the female form, including fine-art nude studies.	JPL · 13792
13793 Laubernasconi	1998 VB_{4}	Laurent Bernasconi (born 1966), French amateur astronomer, has collaborated with the Pises Observatory for many years. He has built several CCD cameras and automated telescope control systems, used by many amateurs in France. A fine observer, he has also discovered several minor planets using automated means.	JPL · 13793
13798 Cecchini	1998 VK_{33}	Vasco Cecchini (1932–2023), an Italian amateur astronomer who collaborated with the Pian dei Termini Observatory.	JPL · 13798

== 13801–13900 ==
back to top

Named minor planet	Provisional	This minor planet was named for...	Ref; Catalog
13801 Kohlhase	1998 VP_{44}	Charles Kohlhase (born 1935), an American aerospace engineer has been a pioneer in the design, development and execution of planetary missions for more than four decades at the Jet Propulsion Laboratory. He twice received NASA's Outstanding Leadership Medal for the epic Voyager Grand Tour mission to the outer planets.	JPL · 13801
13804 Hrazany	1998 XK	Hrazany, a Czech village, is the site of an ancient Celtic town in central Bohemia above the Vltava river in a gold-mining region. With an area of about 75 acres, it was settled in the second century B.C. and was destroyed in the first century A.D..	JPL · 13804
13806 Darmstrong	1998 XM_{6}	Dale Henry Armstrong (born 1962), is a Canadian amateur astronomer and high-school geography teacher with keen observing skills.	JPL · 13806
13808 Davewilliams	1998 XG_{24}	Dafydd Williams (born 1954), a Canadian astronaut who flew on space shuttle mission STS-90 after being selected in 1992. As a physician, he has focused on medical aspects of space flight.	JPL · 13808
13815 Furuya	1998 YF_{7}	Kazuko Furuya (born 1954) has devoted herself to kindergarten education since 1975. At present she is making efforts to give great dreams and hope to children with a creative teaching method, in the position of vice principal at Hadano Municipal Honcho kindergarten in Kanagawa prefecture	JPL · 13815
13816 Stülpner	1998 YH_{27}	Karl Stülpner (1762–1841), a popular hero of Germany's Ore Mountains, lived in Scharfenstein, near Drebach. He and his group of hunters wandered through the Saxonian and Bohemian Ore mountains providing order and justice and helping those in need.	JPL · 13816
13817 Genobechetti	1999 RH_{39}	Geno Bechetti (b.~1958) was a telescope operator at Steward Observatory's Bok Telescope and at the Large Binocular Telescope. He was also a member of mountain operations support at the observatory's Mt. Lemmon Station. He is an avid motorcyclist, logging over 300 thousand miles touring the United States	JPL · 13817
13818 Ullery	1999 RE_{92}	Elaine Ullery mentored a finalist in the 2002 Discovery Channel Youth Science Challenge (DCYSC), a middle school science competition. She teaches at the Pinedale Middle School, Pinedale, Wyoming	JPL · 13818
13820 Schwartz	1999 VQ	Michael Schwartz (born 1950) contributes to professional-amateur cooperative discovery and measurement of supernovae and efforts in improving automated astronomy at Tenagra Observatory in Patagonia, Arizona	JPL · 13820
13822 Stevedodson	1999 VV_{17}	Steve Dodson (born 1943), a Canadian amateur astronomer, taught high school in northern Ontario. From 1982 to 1992 he was on the staff at Science North in Sudbury. Beginning in 1994, he made thousands of small "Stargazer Steve" telescopes.	JPL · 13822
13824 Kramlik	1999 VG_{86}	Thomas Kramlik mentored a finalist in the 2002 Discovery Channel Youth Science Challenge (DCYSC), a middle school science competition. He teaches at the Penndale Middle School, Lansdale, Pennsylvania	JPL · 13824
13825 Booth	1999 VJ_{87}	Tempest Diane Booth mentored a finalist in the 2002 Discovery Channel Youth Science Challenge (DCYSC), a middle school science competition. She teaches at the Southside Fundamental Middle School, St. Petersburg, Florida	JPL · 13825
13830 ARLT	1999 XM_{7}	The ARLT (Automatic Radio-Linked Telescope), a 0.44-m f/4.5 Newtonian located 40 km from Silver City, New Mexico, was one of the first remotely controlled automated CCD imaging facilities. Some 20~000 images obtained during 1991–1997 contributed to 22 publications or formal presentations	JPL · 13830
13840 Wayneanderson	1999 XW_{31}	Wayne E. Anderson, 2001 DCYSC mentor. Anderson is a teacher at the House Junior High School, House, New Mexico	JPL · 13840
13841 Blankenship	1999 XO_{32}	Paula A. Blankenship, 2001 DCYSC mentor. Blankenship is a teacher at the St. Michael Parish School, Wheeling, West Virginia	JPL · 13841
13843 Cowenbrown	1999 XQ_{34}	C. Owen Brown, 2001 DCYSC mentor. Brown is a teacher at the Alexandria Country Day School, Alexandria, Louisiana	JPL · 13843
13845 Jillburnett	1999 XL_{63}	Jill M. Burnett, 2001 DCYSC mentor. Burnett is a teacher at the Canterbury School, Ft. Wayne, Indiana	JPL · 13845
13848 Cioffi	1999 XD_{75}	Jessica Cioffi, 2001 DCYSC mentor. Cioffi is a teacher at the Oslo Middle School, Vero Beach, Florida.	JPL · 13848
13849 Dunn	1999 XN_{86}	Deborah A. Dunn, 2001 DCYSC mentor. Dunn is a teacher at the Mesa Union Junior High School, Somis, California	JPL · 13849
13850 Erman	1999 XO_{88}	Sister Dolores Erman, 2001 DCYSC mentor. Erman is a teacher at the Holy Name School, Sheridan, Wyoming	JPL · 13850
13852 Ford	1999 XM_{96}	Ralph Ford, 2001 DCYSC mentor. Ford is a teacher at the Manhattan Beach Middle School, Manhattan Beach, California	JPL · 13852
13853 Jenniferfritz	1999 XR_{96}	Jennifer K. Fritz, 2001 DCYSC mentor. Fritz is a teacher at the Landisville Middle School, Landisville, Pennsylvania	JPL · 13853
13857 Stafford	1999 XE_{109}	Gregory Stafford (born 1963) is an electronics engineer at the University of Arizona's Steward Observatory.	JPL · 13857
13858 Ericchristensen	1999 XT_{110}	Eric J. Christensen (born 1977), is an American astronomer and survey operations manager with Catalina Sky Survey. He has developed many novel tools to aid observers in validating the reality of moving objects flagged by CSS software, and created the catalog of stationary objects used by the Catalina Real time Transient Survey to identify optical transients. He is credited with the discovery of several comets.	JPL · 13858
13859 Fredtreasure	1999 XQ_{136}	Fred Treasure (born 1943) designed and built the wireless network and codeveloped the control system for the ARLT (Automatic Radio-Linked Telescope), one of the first completely automated remotely controlled CCD imaging facilities	JPL · 13859
13860 Neely	1999 XH_{143}	A. W. Neely (born 1951) codesigned, constructed and operated one of the first completely automated remotely controlled CCD imaging facilities, the ARLT (Automatic Radio-Linked Telescope), which collected 20~000 CCD images during 1991–1997	JPL · 13860
13862 Elais	1999 XT_{160}	Elais, from Greek mythology. She was a daughter of Anius with the power to change berries into olive oil. She and her two sisters, Oeno and Spermo, who had the power to make wine and wheat, helped stock Agamemnon's fleet on their way to Troy and were turned into doves to escape being kidnapped by the Greeks.	IAU · 13862
13868 Catalonia	1999 YZ_{8}	Catalonia is an autonomous region in northeastern Spain bordered by the Mediterranean Sea, France and the regions of Aragon and the Valencian community. The Piera Observatory is located some 50 km northwest of the capital, Barcelona.	JPL · 13868
13869 Fruge	2000 AR_{194}	Norma A. Fruge, 2001 DCYSC mentor. Fruge is a teacher at the F. K. White Middle School, Lake Charles, Louisiana	JPL · 13869
13880 Wayneclark	6607 P-L	Wayne Clark (born 1942) has observed 288 lunar occultations and one minor-planet occultation, and has made some 3200 variable-star observations.	JPL · 13880
13895 Letkasagjonica	2168 T-2	Anna Leticia Rosales Chase (born 1998), Agustin Rosales Chase (born 2000), Kassia Elizabeth Rosales Chase (born 2002), John Arthur Rosales Chase (born 2004), and Nicolas Rosales Chase (born 2007), family friends who are homeschooled by Daniel W. E. Green, who made the identifications for this minor planet.	JPL · 13895
13897 Vesuvius	4216 T-2	Mount Vesuvius, near Naples, Italy, is the famous volcano that destroyed the cities Pompeii and Herculanum in 79 A.D. Large eruptions followed in 1631 and 1944.	JPL · 13897

== 13901–14000 ==
back to top

Named minor planet	Provisional	This minor planet was named for...	Ref; Catalog
13903 Darrylwatanabe	1975 ST	Darryl Y. Watanabe (b. 1961), the Observatory Manager for the NASA Infrared Telescope Facility on Maunakea.	IAU · 13903
13904 Univinnitsa	1975 TJ_{3}	Founded in 1912, the Vinnitsa Pedagogical University has played a great role in the training of teachers for primary and secondary schools in the Podoliya region of Ukraine.	JPL · 13904
13905 Maxbernstein	1976 QA	Max Bernstein (b. 1965), an American astrochemist and NASA Science Mission Directorate Lead for Research.	IAU · 13905
13906 Shunda	1977 QD_{2}	Nikifor Nikolaevich Shunda (born 1932), a mathematician.	JPL · 13906
13908 Wölbern	1978 RH_{9}	Ingo Wölbern (born 1970) is a German geophysicist who has investigated the nature of the Hawaiian mantle plume and the Scandinavian shield by seismological methods.	JPL · 13908
13910 Iranolt	1979 MH_{3}	Ira Nolt, an American astronomer.	IAU13910
13911 Stempels	1979 QT_{1}	Eric Stempels (born 1974) is an astronomer at Uppsala University. He operates a meteor camera and is largely involved in outreach activities.	JPL · 13911
13912 Gammelgarn	1979 QA_{2}	Gammelgarn, a small parish on Gotland, Sweden. Here can be found a well preserved defensive tower close to the old church.	JPL · 13912
13914 Galegant	1980 LC_{1}	Gale D. Gant (born 1936), American amateur astronomer who assisted in organizing the photographic glass plate archive of the 1.2-m Schmidt Oschin Telescope at Palomar Observatory. Active in a leadership role in the Mt. Wilson Observatory Association, he has also made significant contributions to the Mount Wilson Observatory in California.	JPL · 13914
13915 Yalow	1982 KH_{1}	Rosalyn Yalow (born 1921), the first American woman (and second woman ever) to be awarded the Nobel Prize in physiology or medicine.	JPL · 13915
13916 Bernolák	1982 QA_{2}	Anton Bernolák (1762–1813), a Catholic priest who codified the first form of the Slovak language.	JPL · 13916
13917 Correggia	1984 EQ	Matteo Correggia (1962–2001), from the Roero region of Piemonte, was one of the most exceptional Italian winemakers. Though young, his extraordinary talent, passion and modesty won him the highest accolades from international wine experts. The name was suggested by the discoverer, A. W. Harris (JPL) and V. Zappalà.	JPL · 13917
13918 Tsukinada	1984 QB	The sea off the town of Otsuki, Kochi prefecture, is well known for coral products. Underwater corals make the sea of Tsukinada appear pinkish. Its beauty attracts tourists and is also sung of in a folksong	JPL · 13918
13920 Montecorvino	1985 PE_{1}	Montecorvino Rovella, a small Italian town east of Salerno, Campania, site of an amateur astronomical observatory	JPL · 13920
13921 Sgarbini	1985 RP	Bruno Sgarbini (born 1957) directs the "G. C. Gloriosi" amateur astronomical observatory in Montecorvino Rovella, Campania. An ardent popularizer of astronomy, he is also the principal organizer of an annual international astronomy meeting. The citation is endorsed by A. W. Harris and V. Zappalà.	JPL · 13921
13922 Kremenia	1985 SX_{2}	Vasilij Grigorievich Kremen' (born 1947), a member of the Ukrainian Academy of Sciences and president of the Ukrainian Academy of Pedagogical Sciences, is a scientist of history, philology and pedagogics.	JPL · 13922
13923 Peterhof	1985 UA_{5}	Peterhof Palace, celebrating its 300th anniversary in 2005, was founded near St. Petersburg as a royal seaside summer residence.	JPL · 13923
13926 Berners-Lee	1986 XT	Tim Berners-Lee (born 1955) is the creator of a hypertext program that evolved into the World Wide Web. He founded the World Wide Web Consortium (W3C) at the Massachusetts Institute of Technology.	JPL · 13926
13927 Grundy	1987 SV_{3}	Arthur Francis Grundy (born 1928) taught mathematics at Emanuel School, London, from 1957 to 1993. The name is endorsed by T. Berners-Lee, who, along with the discoverer, profited from Grundy's skillful teaching.	JPL · 13927
13928 Aaronrogers	1987 UT	Aaron Rogers (1905–1989) taught mathematics at Emanuel School, London, from 1937 to 1970. His kindness to the discoverer exemplified a caring man of strong character.	JPL · 13928
13930 Tashko	1988 RQ_{8}	Tashko Vulchev (1970–1999) was a highly talented young astronomer-scientist at the Bulgarian National Astronomical Observatory. He died tragically shortly before the presentation of his Ph.D. thesis on the variability and structure of the stellar wind in the luminous massive stars	JPL · 13930
13931 Tonydenault	1988 RF_{13}	Anthony Denault (b. 1961), the Senior Software Manager for the NASA Infrared Telescope Facility on Maunakea.	IAU · 13931
13932 Rupprecht	1988 SL_{1}	Gero Rupprecht (born 1954) was a German astronomer at the European Southern Observatory from 1988 until 2019. He has been an integral part of astronomical instrumentation projects (FORS, HARPS and MUSE) that enabled the community to make numerous astronomical discoveries.	JPL · 13932
13933 Charleville	1988 VE_{1}	Charleville, Queensland, Australia, home of the Charleville Cosmos Centre	JPL · 13933
13934 Kannami	1988 XE_{2}	Kannami, a town in Shizuoka prefecture, Japan.	JPL · 13934
13937 Roberthargraves	1989 PU	Robert Bero Hargraves (born 1928), Princeton University professor of geosciences.	JPL · 13937
13942 Shiratakihime	1989 VS_{2}	Some 1300 years ago, according to local legend, Princess Shirataki came to Kiryu from the imperial city of Kyoto. She brought with her the skills of sericulture and weaving. Textile weaving has become the principal industry of Kiryu	JPL · 13942
13943 Hankgreen	1990 HG	William Henry ‘Hank’ Green II (b. 1980), an American science communicator, author, and creator.	IAU · 13943
13952 Nykvist	1990 SN_{6}	Sven Nykvist (1922–2006), a Swedish cinematographer. [MPC 88406]	MPC · 13952
13954 Born	1990 TF_{8}	Max Born, German mathematician and physicist.	JPL · 13954
13956 Banks	1990 VG_{6}	Joseph Banks, British botanist	JPL · 13956
13957 NARIT	1991 AG_{2}	The National Astronomical Research Institute of Thailand (NARIT) was established in 2004 to commemorate the life and work of King Mongkut the "Father of Thai Science"	JPL · 13957
13962 Delambre	1991 PO_{4}	Jean Baptiste Joseph Delambre, French astronomer and mathematician	JPL · 13962
13963 Euphrates	1991 PT_{4}	The Euphrates river flows through northern Syria and Iraq. At Al Qurnah the Tigris and Euphrates rivers come close together, forming the Tigris-Euphrates system.	JPL · 13963
13964 La Billardière	1991 PO_{5}	Jacques-Julien Houtou de La Billardière, French naturalist, who participated in the search for the vanished La Pérouse	JPL · 13964
13975 Beatrixpotter	1992 BP_{2}	Beatrix Potter (1866–1943) was an English writer, illustrator and natural scientist. Her books for children, e.g. The Tale of Peter Rabbit, that she illustrated with animals, made her famous. She was also highly respected for her studies and watercolors of mushrooms.	JPL · 13975
13977 Frisch	1992 HJ_{7}	Karl von Frisch, an Austrian ethologist who received the Nobel Prize in Physiology or Medicine in 1973.	JPL · 13977
13978 Hiwasa	1992 JQ	Hiwasa, a Japanese coastal town in Tokushima prefecture. Its Ohama Beach is known for sea turtles coming ashore to lay eggs and has an aquarium specializing in sea turtles.	JPL · 13978
13980 Neuhauser	1992 NS	Philipp D. Neuhauser (1930–2003), a key member of the Public Affairs Office at the Jet Propulsion Laboratory.	JPL · 13980
13982 Thunberg	1992 RB_{3}	Carl Peter Thunberg (1743–1828), Swedish botanist, was one of the last pupils of Carl Linnaeus, is considered the greatest botanist of his time. In 1770 he joined Dutch botanists on a journey to Japan. In the Cape area of South Africa, he collected more than 3000 new species. He wrote the first guide to Japanese flora, which made him famous in Japan.	JPL · 13982
13989 Murikabushi	1993 BG	Murikabushi ("a swarm of stars" in the Okinawa dialect) is the name of the 1.05-m infrared-optical telescope at the Ishigakijima Astronomical Observatory.	JPL · 13989
13991 Kenphillips	1993 FZ_{6}	Ken Phillips (born 1946), a solar physicist at the Rutherford Appleton Laboratory, works on the heating of the solar corona and x-ray spectroscopy and solar and stellar flares.	JPL · 13991
13992 Cesarebarbieri	1993 FL_{8}	Cesare Barbieri (born 1942), an Italian astronomer at Padua University, responsible for the construction and scientific calibration of the Wide Angle Camera for the OSIRIS system of the cometary mission ROSETTA.	JPL · 13992
13993 Clemenssimmer	1993 FN_{9}	Clemens Simmer (born 1954), a German meteorologist, works on radiative transport theory and remote sensing for meteorological applications.	JPL · 13993
13994 Tuominen	1993 FA_{15}	Ilkka Tuominen, Finnish astronomer at University of Oulu, works on the solar cycle, late-type star activity and astrophysical magnetohydrodynamics.	JPL · 13994
13995 Tõravere	1993 FV_{16}	Tõravere (Tartu), is a small village in Estonia, where the Tartu Observatory is located nearby.	MPC · 13995

back to top

Preceded by 12,001–13,000	Meanings of minor-planet names List of minor planets: 13,001–14,000	Succeeded by 14,001–15,000
