= Agasthenes (disambiguation) =

Agasthenes may refer to:

- 13185 Agasthenes, Jovian asteroid
- Agasthenes, hero from Greek mythology
- Agasthenes (wasp), a genus of wasps
