= 13241 Biyo =

Main-belt asteroid

Discovery
- Discovered by: LINEAR
- Discovery site: Lincoln Lab's ETS
- Discovery date: 22 May 1998

Designations
- Named after: Josette Biyo (Filipino educator)
- Alternative designations: 1998 KM_{41} · 1975 UB_{1}
- Minor planet category: main-belt · Flora region background

Orbital characteristics
- Epoch 27 April 2019 (JD 2458600.5)
- Uncertainty parameter 0
- Observation arc: 44.01 yr (16,073 d)
- Aphelion: 2.4215 AU
- Perihelion: 2.1263 AU
- Semi-major axis: 2.2739 AU
- Eccentricity: 0.0649
- Orbital period (sidereal): 3.43 yr (1,252 d)
- Mean anomaly: 125.48°
- Mean motion: 0° 17^{m} 14.64^{s} / day
- Inclination: 7.3001°
- Longitude of ascending node: 56.739°
- Argument of perihelion: 93.848°

Physical characteristics
- Mean diameter: 3.9 km (calculated)
- Synodic rotation period: 4.4±0.4 h 2.199±0.219 h (half-period)
- Geometric albedo: 0.24 (assumed)
- Spectral type: S V–R = 0.380±0.03
- Absolute magnitude (H): 14.2; 14.3

13241 Biyo, provisional designation 1998 KM_{41}, is a background asteroid from the Flora region of the inner asteroid belt, approximately 4 kilometers (2.5 miles) in diameter. It was discovered on 22 May 1998, by the Lincoln Near-Earth Asteroid Research team (LINEAR) at the U.S. Lincoln Laboratory Experimental Test Site in Socorro, New Mexico. The presumed S-type asteroid has a rotation period of 4.4 hours and likely an elongated shape. It was later named after Filipino educator Josette Biyo.

== Orbit and classification ==
Biyo is a non-family asteroid of the main belt's background population when applying the hierarchical clustering method to its proper orbital elements. Based on osculating Keplerian orbital elements, the asteroid has also been classified as a member of the Flora family (402), a giant asteroid clan and the largest family of stony asteroids in the main-belt.

It orbits the Sun in the inner asteroid belt at a distance of 2.1–2.4 AU once every 3 years and 5 months (1,252 days; semi-major axis of 2.27 AU). Its orbit has an eccentricity of 0.06 and an inclination of 7° with respect to the ecliptic. It was first identified as 1975 UB_{1} at the Karl Schwarzschild Observatory in 1975, extending the body's observation arc by 23 years prior to its official discovery observation at Socorro.

== Naming ==
This minor planet was named after Josette Biyo (born 1958), a Filipino educator, former executive director of the Philippine Science High School System and now the director of Department of Science and Technology- Science Education Institute. The naming was part of the International Excellence in Teaching Award she received during the Intel International Science and Engineering Fair held in Louisville, Kentucky, in 2002, when she was a teacher at the Philippine Science High School in Iloilo, Philippines. Biyo was the first Asian teacher to win the Intel Excellence in Teaching Award. The official naming citation was published by the Minor Planet Center on 24 July 2002 (M.P.C. 46109).

== Physical characteristics ==
=== Rotation and shape ===
In March 2011, a rotational lightcurve of Biyo was obtained from photometric observations by Italian astronomers at the Virginio Cesarini Observatory (157) in Frasso Sabino, Italy. Lightcurve analysis gave a rotation period of 4.4 hours (twice the original reported period solution of 2.199±0.219 in the R-band) with a brightness amplitude of 0.99 magnitude, which indicates that the body has an elongated, non-spheroidal shape (U=2). The Italian astronomers also determined a V–R color of 0.38.

=== Diameter and albedo ===
For this asteroid, no observational data has been gathered by the space-based telescopes (IRAS, Akari and WISE) that surveyed large portions of the asteroid belt. The Collaborative Asteroid Lightcurve Link assumes an albedo for a stony asteroid of 0.24 – derived from 8 Flora, the largest member and namesake of the Flora family – and calculates a diameter of 3.92 kilometers with an absolute magnitude of 14.2.
