= Josette Biyo =

Filipina biologist and academic administrator (born 1958)

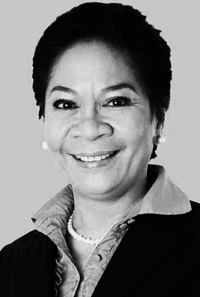
- Biyo in 2018
- Born: Josette Talamera; March 19, 1958 (age 68); Janiuay, Iloilo, Philippines
- Occupation: Academic

Josette Talamera Biyo (Note: In this Philippine name for married women, the birth surname or paternal family name is Talamera, and the marital name is Biyo.) (born March 19, 1958) is a Filipina biologist and academic administrator who served as executive director of the Philippine Science High School System from 2011 to 2014. She has received international recognition for her contributions to science and education.

== Early life and academics ==
Josette Biyo was born on March 19, 1958, in Januiay, Iloilo. She earned her bachelor's degree in biological sciences from the University of the Philippines Visayas in Miagao, intending to continue to medical school. Instead, she took a teaching post and afterward earned a Ph.D. in biology from De La Salle University in Manila. Her dissertation examined seagrass community dynamics on Guimaras Island.

In 2004, Biyo was conferred with an honorary doctorate in humanities by the Manila Central University.

== Career ==
After her research concluded, Biyo spent eight years teaching in a rural community in her home province, Iloilo. She used her knowledge of biology to educate the residents in primary health care using local plants and ingredients.

In 1995, Biyo accepted a science teaching position at the Philippine Science High School Western Visayas Campus. In her three years there, she developed an educational philosophy that fosters a "culture of science". She also organized teaching trips for educators on the island of Panay, was invited to Laos and Cambodia to speak on her teaching ideology, and developed a formal method of science teaching and research.

Biyo served as the Executive Director of the Philippine Science High School System from October 17, 2011 to March 31, 2014. Afterwards, she became the director of the Department of Science and Technology – Science Education Institute.

=== Biyo science research teaching method ===
Biyo's methodology encourages students to adopt several learning and life behaviors, in order to maximize their career potential.

- Build a physical library of science books
- Conduct field studies that ask interesting and difficult questions
- Establish personal connections with research institutions and laboratories
- Hold science forums in and after school
- Teach students field and lab techniques to aid in research work.

Biyo's mentorship and teaching methods have cultivated noteworthy scientists in diverse fields of research, including oceanography, marine life, physics, and robotics.

== Awards and honors ==
- Outstanding Teacher of the Philippines, 1997
- Ten Outstanding Young Filipinos, 1998 (Philippine Jaycees and Gerry Roxas Foundation)
- International Excellence in Teaching Award during the ISEF in 2002
- Award for Continuing Excellence and Service (ACES), 2004
- Distinguished Lasallian Award, 2004
- "Women of Distinction Award", 2004 (Soroptimist International)
- Fil-Up Award, 2004 (Global Doors Foundation)
- Doctor of Humanities (honoris causa), 2004 (Manila Central University)
- Philippine American Foundation Friendship Award, 2004 (National Press Club)
- Presidential Award, 2007 (Philippine College of Physicians)
- Lingkod Bayan Award, 2007 (Civil Service Commission)
- Special Award, 2007 (Outstanding Women in the Nation’s Service)
- 50 Great Men and Women in Science, 2008 (Department of Science and Technology)
- National Award for Community Service, 2008 (Rotary Club of Makati)
- Honorary Fellow, 2009 (Philippine College of Physicians)

The Florian main-belt asteroid 13241 Biyo, discovered by LINEAR at Lincoln Lab's ETS in 1998, was named in her honor. The naming was part of the International Excellence in Teaching Award she received during the Intel International Science and Engineering Fair in 2002. The official naming citation was published by the Minor Planet Center on 24 July 2002 (M.P.C. 46109).
