= 13260 Sabadell =

Asteroid

Discovery
- Discovered by: F. Casarramona; A. Vidal
- Discovery site: Montjoia Obs.
- Discovery date: 23 August 1998

Designations
- Named after: Agrupació Astronómica de Sabadell (astronomical society)
- Alternative designations: 1998 QZ_{15} · 1974 TQ_{1}
- Minor planet category: main-belt · Eunomia

Orbital characteristics
- Epoch 1 July 2021 (JD 2459396.5)
- Uncertainty parameter 0
- Observation arc: 69.36 yr (25,334 d)
- Aphelion: 2.9499 AU
- Perihelion: 2.1479 AU
- Semi-major axis: 2.5489 AU
- Eccentricity: 0.1573
- Orbital period (sidereal): 4.07 yr (1,486 d)
- Mean anomaly: 249.07°
- Mean motion: 0° 14^{m} 31.92^{s} / day
- Inclination: 12.760°
- Longitude of ascending node: 286.92°
- Argument of perihelion: 7.1969°

Physical characteristics
- Mean diameter: 5.304±0.105 km
- Synodic rotation period: 6.4366±0.0007 h
- Geometric albedo: 0.306±0.029
- Spectral type: S
- Absolute magnitude (H): 13.66; 13.1

13260 Sabadell, prov. designation: 1998 QZ_{15}, is a stony Eunomia asteroid from the central region of the asteroid belt. It was discovered by Catalan amateur astronomers Ferran Casarramona and Antoni Vidal at the Montjoia Observatory (953), Barcelona, on 23 August 1998. The likely elongated asteroid measures approximately 5.3 kilometers (3.3 miles) in diameter and has a rotation period of 5.3 hours. It was named after the astronomical society "Agrupació Astronòmica de Sabadell".

== Orbit and classification ==
Sabadell is a core member of the Eunomia family (502), a large group of S-type asteroids and the most prominent family in the intermediate main-belt. It orbits the Sun in the central main-belt at a distance of 2.1–2.9 AU once every 4 years and 1 month (1,486 days; semi-major axis of 2.55 AU). Its orbit has an eccentricity of 0.16 and an inclination of 13° with respect to the ecliptic. A first precovery was taken at Palomar Observatory in January 1952, extending the asteroid's observation arc by 46 years prior to its official discovery at Montjoia Observatory.

== Naming ==
This minor planet was named for the well known Catalan–Spanish amateur astronomical society Agrupació Astronómica de Sabadell, which celebrated its 40th anniversary in 2000. Both discoverers are members of this society. The approved naming citation was published by the Minor Planet Center on 26 July 2000 (M.P.C. 41032). The society uses the Observatorio de Sabadell (619), one of the country's most prolific amateur observatories, located in a park in the center of Sabadell, near Barcelona, Spain.

== Physical characteristics ==
=== Lightcurves ===
In 2006, a rotational lightcurve was obtained from photometric observations by Italian astronomers Silvano Casulli and Antonio Vagnozzi. It gave a well-defined rotation period of 6.4366±0.0007 hours with a high brightness amplitude of 0.56±0.01 in magnitude (U=3), indicative of an elongated, non-spherical shape.

=== Diameter and albedo ===
According to the survey carried out by the NEOWISE mission of NASA's Wide-field Infrared Survey Explorer, the asteroid measures 5.3 kilometers in diameter and has a high surface albedo of 0.31, while the Collaborative Asteroid Lightcurve Link assumes an albedo of 0.21 and calculates a diameter of 6.1 kilometers, as the lower the body's albedo (reflectivity) the higher its diameter, at a constant absolute magnitude (brightness).
