= Hrazany =

- Municipality
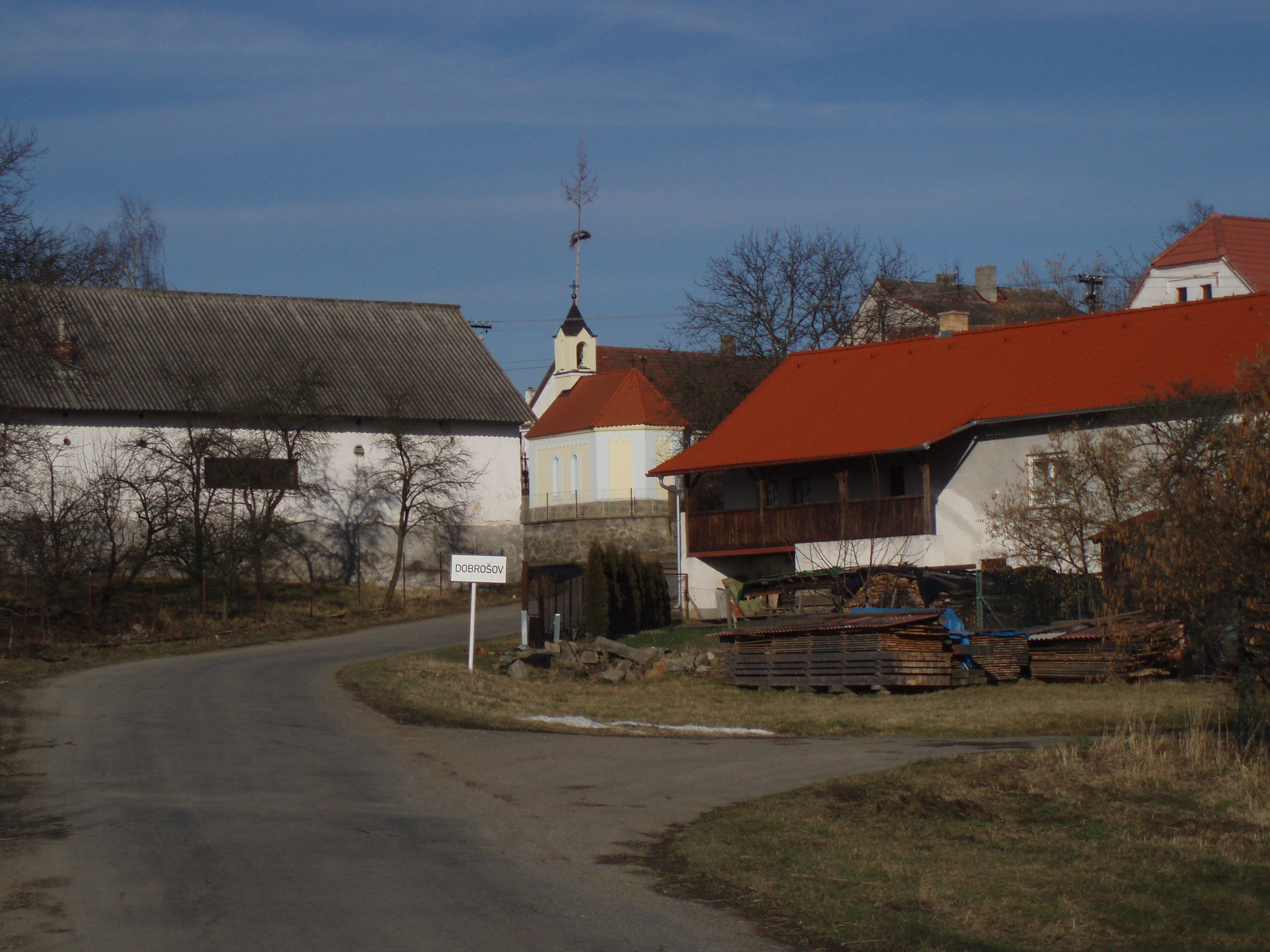
- Dobrošov, a part of Hrazany

- Flag Coat of arms

- Location in the Czech Republic
- Coordinates: 49°31′22″N 14°20′6″E
- Country: Czech Republic
- Region: South Bohemian
- District: Písek
- First mentioned: 1373

Area
  - Total: 8.49 km^{2} (3.28 sq mi)
- Elevation: 535 m (1,755 ft)

Population (2026-01-01)
  - Total: 291
  - Density: 34.3/km^{2} (88.8/sq mi)
- Time zone: UTC+1 (CET)
  - Summer (DST): UTC+2 (CEST)
- Postal code: 399 01
- Website: www.obechrazany.cz

Hrazany is a municipality and village in Písek District in the South Bohemian Region of the Czech Republic. It has about 300 inhabitants.

== Administrative division ==
Hrazany consists of four municipal parts (in brackets population according to the 2021 census):

- Hrazany (52)
- Dobrošov (54)
- Hrazánky (105)
- Klisinec (51)

== Etymology ==
The name Hrazany has no clear origin. It was most likely derived from the Czech word hráz (i.e. 'dyke') or hrad (i.e. 'castle'). Hrazánky is a diminutive of Hrazany.

== Geography ==
Hrazany is located about 27 kilometres (17 mi) northeast of Písek and 54 km (34 mi) south of Prague. It lies in the Vlašim Uplands. The highest point is at 582 metres (1,909 ft) above sea level.

Near the village of Hrazany there is the Kněz u Hrazan Nature Monument. It is a blockfield, a remnant of the glacial age.

== History ==
The first written mention of Hrazany and Hrazánky is from 1373. The village of Dobrošov was first mentioned in 1216.

== Demographics ==
Historical population

Year	Pop.	±%
1869	689	—
1880	666	−3.3%
1890	636	−4.5%
1900	598	−6.0%
1910	566	−5.4%

Year	Pop.	±%
1921	554	−2.1%
1930	512	−7.6%
1950	410	−19.9%
1961	424	+3.4%
1970	383	−9.7%

Year	Pop.	±%
1980	372	−2.9%
1991	305	−18.0%
2001	275	−9.8%
2011	281	+2.2%
2021	262	−6.8%

Source: Censuses

== Transport ==
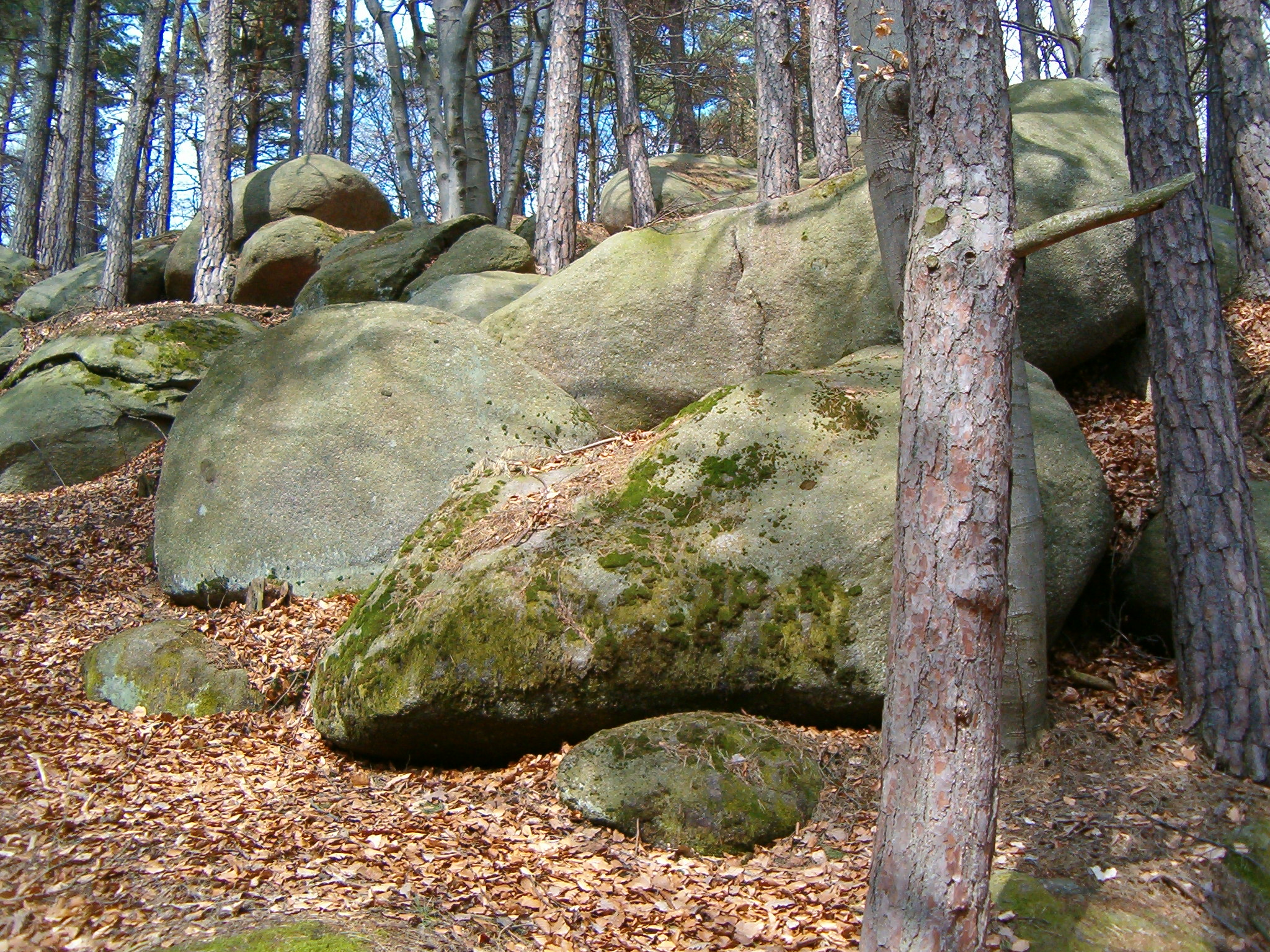
Kněz u Hrazan Nature Monument

There are no railways or major roads passing through the municipality.

== Sights ==
Almost no original buildings have been preserved. The only monuments are the chapels. The oldest one is the Chapel of Saint John of Nepomuk in Hrazánky from the 19th century. The Chapel of the Holy Spirit in Hrazany dates from 1926 and the Chapel of Saint Wenceslaus in Dobrošov dates from 1932.
