= Agasthenes =

Character from Greek mythology

In Greek mythology, Agasthenes (Ancient Greek: Ἀγασθένης) was the son of Augeas, and his successor in the kingdom of Elis. The government was shared between Amphimachus, Thalpius and Agasthenes. With Peloris, he was the father of Polyxenus, one of the "suitors of Helen", who reunified the kingdom when he returned from Troy.

== See also ==
- Asteroid 13185 Agasthenes, named after the Greek hero
