= Yu Chunshun =

Yu Chunshun (1951–1996; simplified Chinese: 余纯顺; traditional Chinese: 余純順; pinyin: Yú Chúnshùn) was a Chinese explorer. He died of dehydration in 1996 while searching for a lost oasis in the Lop Nur desert in Xinjiang province, People's Republic of China. His body was discovered only two kilometers away from his next buried cache of food and water. Asteroid 83600 Yuchunshun, discovered by Bill Yeung in 2001, was named in his memory. The official naming citation was published by the Minor Planet Center on 18 June 2008 (M.P.C. 63174).
