= Vivian Yam =

Hong Kong chemist

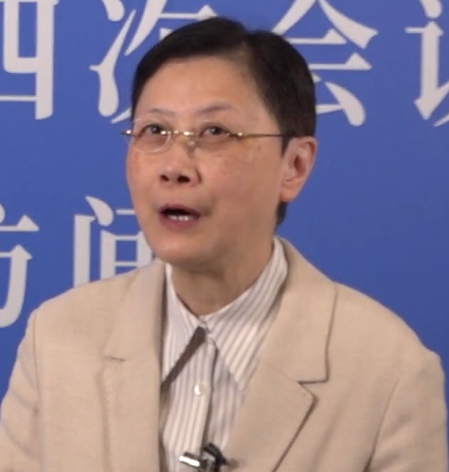
- Yam in 2026
- Born: 10 February 1963 (age 63); Hong Kong
- Education: University of Hong Kong
- Spouse: Patrick Shing-Tat Mak (Chinese: 麥成達)
- Children: 2 daughters
- Awards: L'Oréal-UNESCO Awards for Women in Science (2011); Royal Society of Chemistry's Ludwig Mond Award (2015)
- Scientific career
- Fields: chemistry
- Institutions: University of Hong Kong (HKU)
- Doctoral advisor: Che Chi-ming

Chinese name
- Traditional Chinese: 任詠華
- Simplified Chinese: 任咏华
- Hanyu Pinyin: Rén Yǒnghuá
- Yale Romanization: Yahm Wihng-wàah
- Jyutping: Jam4 Wing6-waa4

Professor Vivian Yam Wing-wah (born 10 February 1963) CSci, CChem, FRSC, is a Hong Kong chemist. Yam is the youngest female member ever to be elected to the Chinese Academy of Sciences. She was a 2011 L'Oréal-UNESCO Awards for Women in Science laureate "for her work on light-emitting materials and innovative ways of capturing solar energy."

== Early years and education ==
Vivian Wing-Wah Yam was born in British Hong Kong. Her father was a civil engineer, although Yam says that neither he nor her mother steered her toward her career. Yam cites being intrigued by the sight of mercury and a workaholic and pregnant biology teacher who taught her up to the very last minute.

Yam attended an Anglican grammar school. She received her B.Sc. in chemistry (1985) and PhD (1988) degrees at the University of Hong Kong (HKU) where she was on the badminton team, studying under Chi-Ming Che.

== Career ==
In 1988, she became a junior faculty member at the Department of Applied Science, City Polytechnic of Hong Kong; at the time, there were no facilities at all for teaching chemistry. She helped with establishing the first chemistry books in the library as well as ordering the first beakers and chemicals. Yam's work took her to Caltech in the late 1980s, where she investigated excited state spectrocsopy under Harry B. Gray. After a spell at the University of Rochester (with David G. Whitten) in 1990 she went to study at the Imperial College London in 1991 (with the Nobel laureate Geoffrey Wilkinson) and stayed until 1992. Her research turned to organometallic synthesis "studying the luminescence of complexes with metal–metal interactions". She worked with tetraethyllead which at the time was not a banned additives for petrol. This work was on the border between organic and inorganic chemicals.

Yam has been associated particularly with the elements osmium, platinum and ruthenium. She joined the HKU faculty in 2001 where she is the Philip Wong Wilson Wong Professor of Chemistry and Energy. Yam became a Fulbright Scholar in 2007.

"My research team focuses on new classes of photoactive materials based on organometallics with new properties by combining components associating metal atoms and organic molecules that absorb or emit light."

Yam was elected to the Chinese Academy of Sciences in 2001, aged 38, becoming the youngest female member. The previous holder of this record was, Che, Yam's earlier mentor. She was elected a Fellow of the Academy of Sciences for the Developing World in 2006 and a member of the Foreign Associate of National Academy of Sciences in 2012.

== Application ==
Yam's research deals with organic light emitting diodes which are brighter and more efficient that the older light emitting diodes; her chemistry has enabled much more efficient displays to be created for mobile phones and laptops. These OLEDs can be deposited on clear plastic, glass or more unusual materials to also create improved car headlamps and larger flat television screens. Yam quotes that nearly a fifth of the world's power is used to create lighting. Creating more efficient lighting will significantly affect the world's power consumption. She believes internal quantum theory indicates that we may develop lamps based on metal containing chemicals that are 100% efficient.

== Awards and honours ==
Her awards include the HKU Outstanding Researcher Award (1999–2000), Croucher Foundation Senior Research Fellow (2000–01), Ten Outstanding Young Persons of Hong Kong in 2002, Outstanding Women Professionals and Entrepreneurs Awards (2005), State Natural Science Award (Second Class, 2005), the Royal Society of Chemistry Centenary Lectureship & Medal (2005/06), and the Japanese Photochemistry Association Lectureship Award for Asian and Oceanian Photochemist Eikohsha Award, (2006), HKU Distinguished Research Achievement Award (2006/07), Hong Kong Outstanding Women Professionals and Entrepreneurs Award (2008), Ho Leung Ho Lee Prize for Scientific and Technological Progress (2011), the L'OREAL-UNESCO for Women in Science Award (2011), the 13th World Outstanding Chinese Award (2013). and the Royal Society of Chemistry's Ludwig Mond Award (2015). Asteroid 83363 Yamwingwah, discovered by Bill Yeung in 2001, was named in her honour. The official naming citation was published by the Minor Planet Center on 17 May 2011 (M.P.C. 75104). In 2016, she became a laureate of the Asian Scientist 100 by the Asian Scientist.

== Personal life ==
In 1990, she married Patrick Shing-Tat Mak (Chinese: 麥成達) whom she met in Che's laboratory, where they conducted research together. They have two daughters.
