= Che Chi-ming =

Chinese bio-chemist (born 1957)

- Born: 7 September 1957 (age 68); British Hong Kong
- Occupations: Professor; Researcher; Member of Chinese Academy of Sciences
- Known for: Inorganic Chemistry; Medicinal Chemistry

Academic work
- Doctoral students: Vivian Yam; Xin-yuan Liu
- Notable works: Metal Catalyst; OLED; Anticancer metal complexes

Che Chi-ming (Chinese: 支志明; pinyin: Zhī Zhìmíng; born 7 September 1957), is a Hong Kong chemist currently holding Zhou Guangzhao Professorship in Natural Sciences, following a Dr. Hui Wai-Haan's Chair of Chemistry at the University of Hong Kong (HKU). In 1995, he became the first scientist from Hong Kong to be elected as a member of the Chinese Academy of Sciences. As of today, he remains the youngest academician of the CAS ever to be elected. He is known for extensive work in inorganic chemistry, photochemistry, and medicinal chemistry.

== Career ==
Che received his B.S. degree at HKU in 1978. He then received his Ph. D degree in inorganic chemistry at HKU working under Professor Chung-Kwong Poon in 1980. After earning his Ph. D., he spent 3 years at the California Institute of Technology conducting research in organometallic and bioinorganic chemistry in the laboratory of Harry B. Gray.

Following his research stay in the United States, Che moved back to Hong Kong and started his independent career as a faculty at HKU. During the past 20 years, he has also held visiting lecturer positions at National Taiwan University, Jilin University, and Sun Yat-sen University. Moreover, he has been a professor at Nanjing University, Nankai University, and Tsinghua University; and an honorary professor at Huazhong University of Science and Technology, Northeast Normal University, Nanjing University, and other universities.

In 2007, he was elected as a member of The World Academy of Sciences (TWAS) in Chemical Sciences. In 2013, he was elected as a foreign associate of the United States National Academy of Sciences.

Currently, he is the Zhou Guangzhao Professorship in Natural Sciences and Chair of Chemistry, Department of Chemistry, Faculty of Science, the University of Hong Kong.

In December 2021, it was reported that Che was eligible to vote four times in the 2021 Hong Kong legislative election, yielding 0.0459334% of the total voting value (elected seats), which is 9242 times more than the value of an average voter's total voting value.

== Research ==
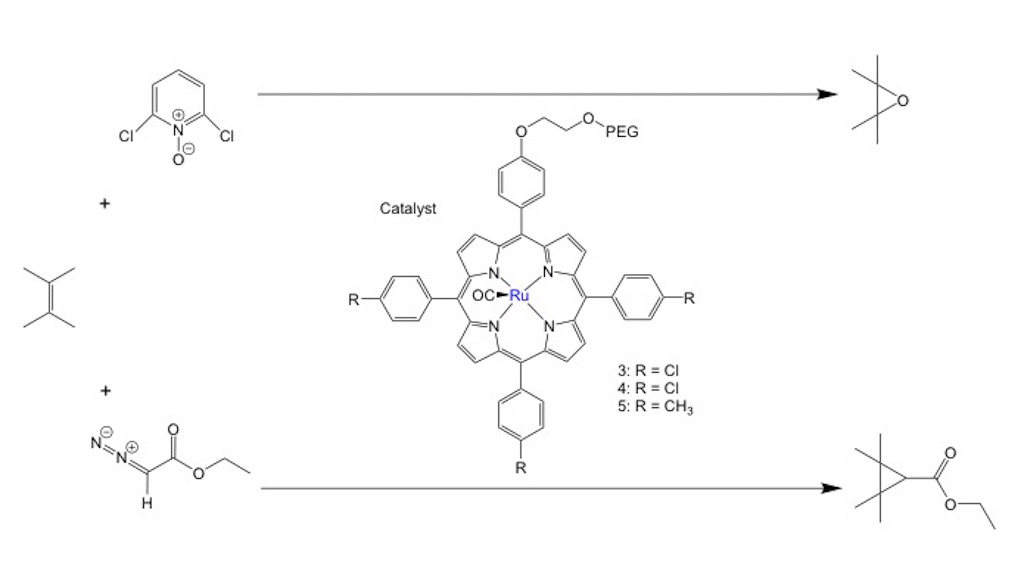
Ruthenium(III) porphyrin functionalized with PEG group is used as a catalyst to drive selective pathway of alkene to epoxide or cyclopropane.

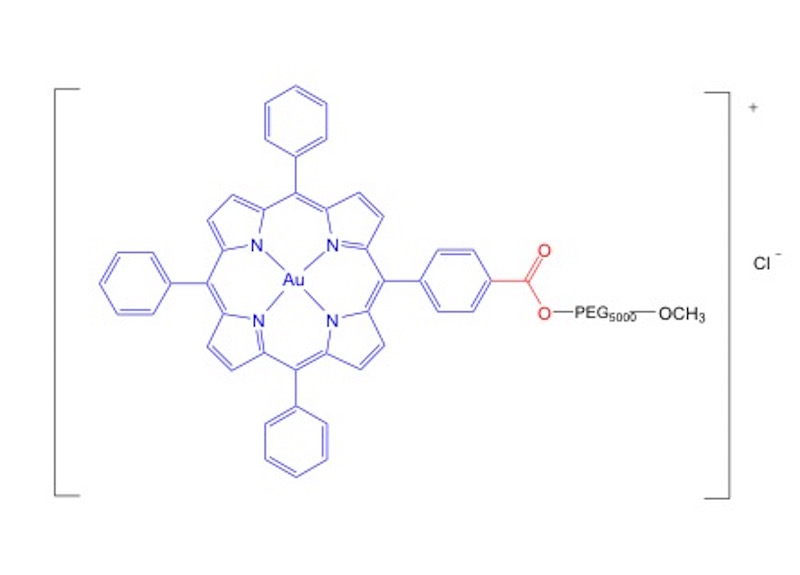
Structure of PEGylated Gold(III) Conjugates

Che's research interests cover various areas in chemistry such as inorganic chemistry, materials science, photochemistry, and biomedical sciences. He has been engaged in inorganic chemistry research, organometallic synthesis where he and his group have studied high-valent and multimetallic complexes. These molecules have been investigated for their luminescent and catalytic properties. Notable systems that Che has developed include: catalysts for asymmetric olefin epoxidation, biomimetic oxidation catalyst featuring recognition elements, and molecular devices based on luminescent materials.

=== Triplet Emitters ===
Che is a pioneer for the chemistry of d8 and d10 metal complexes including their excited state chemistry and closed shell metal-metal interactions of d8 and d10 metal ions. His team has successfully developed practical tetradentate platinum(II) and gold(III) Emitters which are comparable if not superior in performances to the World best Iridium(III) Phosphors

=== Metal Catalysts ===
Che has pioneered the developed of Ru-OXO system which has opened up numerous opportunities for efficient catalytic oxidation processes.

Furthermore, Che and co-workers developed new methods for epoxidation, cyclopropanation, and aziridination of alkenes. His work on bioinorganic chemistry, has produced new understanding for several important processes including modern nitrogen fixation.

=== Anti-Cancer Metal Complexes ===
Another notable work from Che's group has been the development of gold-, platinum-, ruthenium- and palladium based metal compounds with anti-tumor activity. Specifically, they found that PEGylated gold(III) conjugates can exhibit multifunctional properties and undergo selective delivery to tumor tissues. Importantly, some of these compounds do not exhibit harmful cytotoxicity to normal cells, as many Pt-based anti-cancer agents do.

== Notable awards ==
- 2006 First Class Prize of the State Natural Science Award of China
- 2006 TWAS Prize in chemistry from the Academy of Sciences for the Developing World
- 2013 Royal Society of Chemistry (RSC) Centenary Prize
