= Meanings of minor-planet names: 83001–84000 =

As minor planet discoveries are confirmed, they are given a permanent number by the IAU's Minor Planet Center (MPC), and the discoverers can then submit names for them, following the IAU's naming conventions. The list below concerns those minor planets in the specified number-range that have received names, and explains the meanings of those names.

Official naming citations of newly named small Solar System bodies are approved and published in a bulletin by IAU's Working Group for Small Bodies Nomenclature (WGSBN). Before May 2021, citations were published in MPC's Minor Planet Circulars for many decades. Recent citations can also be found on the JPL Small-Body Database (SBDB). Until his death in 2016, German astronomer Lutz D. Schmadel compiled these citations into the Dictionary of Minor Planet Names (DMP) and regularly updated the collection.

Based on Paul Herget's The Names of the Minor Planets, Schmadel also researched the unclear origin of numerous asteroids, most of which had been named prior to World War II. This article incorporates text from this source, which is in the public domain: SBDB New namings may only be added to this list below after official publication as the preannouncement of names is condemned. The WGSBN publishes a comprehensive guideline for the naming rules of non-cometary small Solar System bodies.

== 83001–83100 ==
| Named minor planet | Provisional | This minor planet was named for... | Ref · Catalog |
|---|---|---|---|
There are no named minor planets in this number range

== 83101–83200 ==
back to top

| Named minor planet | Provisional | This minor planet was named for... | Ref · Catalog |
|---|---|---|---|
There are no named minor planets in this number range

== 83201–83300 ==
back to top

| Named minor planet | Provisional | This minor planet was named for... | Ref · Catalog |
|---|---|---|---|
There are no named minor planets in this number range

== 83301–83400 ==
back to top

| Named minor planet | Provisional | This minor planet was named for... | Ref · Catalog |
|---|---|---|---|
| 83360 Catalina | 2001 SH | Catalina Sky Survey is one of the most successful programs discovering minor planets. It began operations in April 1998, with prominence given to the search of near-Earth object. The program utilizes a 0.76-m Schmidt telescope located on Mt. Bigelow in the Catalina Mountains north of Tucson, Arizona. | JPL · 83360 |
| 83362 Sandukruit | 2001 SH_{1} | Sanduk Ruit (born 1954) is a visionary Nepalese ophthalmologist who founded the Tilganga Eye Centre in Kathmandu. He also created the Himalayan Cataract Project, which had cured hundreds of thousands of cataract patients in poor countries | JPL · 83362 |
| 83363 Yamwingwah | 2001 SU_{1} | Vivian Wing-Wah Yam (Yam Wing Wah, born 1963) is a chemistry professor at the University of Hong Kong. Her research interests are optoelectronic materials, photochromic and photoswitching materials. She won the 13th L´Oréal-UNESCO Women in Science Awards 2011 | JPL · 83363 |

== 83401–83500 ==
back to top

| Named minor planet | Provisional | This minor planet was named for... | Ref · Catalog |
|---|---|---|---|
| 83464 Irishmccalla | 2001 SM_{73} | Irish McCalla (1929–2002) was an American film actress and artist. She produced over 1000 paintings and numerous limited-edition lithographs. She was a member of Woman Artists of the American West. Her art often featured themes from the Old West and the sweet innocence of youth. | JPL · 83464 |

== 83501–83600 ==
back to top

| Named minor planet | Provisional | This minor planet was named for... | Ref · Catalog |
|---|---|---|---|
| 83598 Aiweiwei | 2001 SP_{265} | Ai Weiwei (born 1957) is a Chinese artist and architectural designer. His most famous design was the Beijing National Stadium, more commonly called the Bird's Nest, the main stadium of the 2008 Olympic Games in Beijing | JPL · 83598 |
| 83600 Yuchunshun | 2001 SM_{266} | Yu Chunshun (1951–1996) was a Chinese adventurer. He died in the Lop Nur desert in Xinjiang province, People's Republic of China. | JPL · 83600 |

== 83601–83700 ==
back to top

| Named minor planet | Provisional | This minor planet was named for... | Ref · Catalog |
|---|---|---|---|
| 83657 Albertosordi | 2001 TV_{13} | Alberto Sordi (1920–2003) was an Italian actor, director, comedian, screenwriter, composer, singer and songwriter. | JPL · 83657 |

== 83701–83800 ==
back to top

| Named minor planet | Provisional | This minor planet was named for... | Ref · Catalog |
|---|---|---|---|
There are no named minor planets in this number range

== 83801–83900 ==
back to top

| Named minor planet | Provisional | This minor planet was named for... | Ref · Catalog |
|---|---|---|---|
There are no named minor planets in this number range

== 83901–84000 ==
back to top

| Named minor planet | Provisional | This minor planet was named for... | Ref · Catalog |
|---|---|---|---|
| 83956 Panuzzo | 2001 XX_{30} | Pasquale Panuzzo (born 1972), an Italian astronomer working for the development of the SPIRE instrument of ESA's Herschel mission. His research interests are population synthesis models for dusty galaxies, H II regions, star formation, the ages of early-type galaxies and Spitzer data. | JPL · 83956 |
| 83982 Crantor | 2002 GO_{9} | Crantor, a Lapith killed by the centaur Demoleon in Greek mythology | JPL · 83982 |

back to top

| Preceded by 82,001–83,000 | Meanings of minor-planet names List of minor planets: 83,001–84,000 | Succeeded by 84,001–85,000 |
