= Desert Eagle Observatory =

Private astronomical observatory in Cochise County, Arizona

- Observatory code: 333
- Location: Benson, Cochise County, Arizona
- Coordinates: 31°57′45″N 110°28′34″W

Desert Eagle Observatory (code: 333) is a private amateur astronomical observatory, situated near Benson, Arizona, United States. Operated by Canadian amateur astronomer William Kwong Yu Yeung, the observatory's primary purpose is the observation and discovery of comets and minor planets, which include asteroids and near-Earth objects. At the observatory, Bill Yeung has discovered more than 1,500 minor planets. (Note: As of June 2017, the Minor Planet Center's data base shows a total of 1,569 minor planets that were discovered at "Desert Eagle", starting with 32605 Lucy and ending with the highest numbered minor planet, currently being (494242) 2016 PL_{29})

== See also ==
- List of astronomical observatories
