= List of minor planets: 83001–84000 =

The following is a partial list of minor planets, running from minor-planet number 83001 through 84000, inclusive. The primary data for this and other partial lists is based on JPL's "Small-Body Orbital Elements" and data available from the Minor Planet Center. Critical list information is also provided by the MPC, unless otherwise specified from Lowell Observatory. A detailed description of the table's columns and additional sources are given on the main page including a complete list of every page in this series, and a statistical break-up on the dynamical classification of minor planets.

Also see the summary list of all named bodies in numerical and alphabetical order, and the corresponding naming citations for the number range of this particular list. New namings may only be added to this list after official publication, as the preannouncement of names is condemned by the Working Group for Small Bodies Nomenclature of the International Astronomical Union.

Near-Earth obj.	MBA (inner)	MBA (outer)	Centaur
Mars-crosser	MBA (middle)	Jupiter trojan	Trans-Neptunian obj.
Unclassified

== 83001–83100 ==
Designation			Discovery			Properties		Ref
Permanent	Provisional	Named after	Date	Site	Discoverer(s)	Category	Diam.	Ref
83001	2001 QB_{160}	—	August 23, 2001	Anderson Mesa	LONEOS	·	4.5 km	MPC · JPL
83002	2001 QE_{160}	—	August 23, 2001	Anderson Mesa	LONEOS	NEM	4.1 km	MPC · JPL
83003	2001 QK_{160}	—	August 23, 2001	Anderson Mesa	LONEOS	·	3.9 km	MPC · JPL
83004	2001 QY_{160}	—	August 23, 2001	Anderson Mesa	LONEOS	HYG	5.0 km	MPC · JPL
83005	2001 QX_{161}	—	August 23, 2001	Anderson Mesa	LONEOS	PAD	4.1 km	MPC · JPL
83006	2001 QK_{162}	—	August 23, 2001	Anderson Mesa	LONEOS	THM	7.5 km	MPC · JPL
83007	2001 QP_{162}	—	August 23, 2001	Anderson Mesa	LONEOS	HYG	8.2 km	MPC · JPL
83008	2001 QY_{163}	—	August 31, 2001	Desert Eagle	W. K. Y. Yeung	EOS	5.3 km	MPC · JPL
83009	2001 QH_{164}	—	August 21, 2001	Palomar	NEAT	·	3.1 km	MPC · JPL
83010	2001 QW_{164}	—	August 22, 2001	Haleakala	NEAT	·	2.5 km	MPC · JPL
83011	2001 QF_{165}	—	August 24, 2001	Haleakala	NEAT	·	4.2 km	MPC · JPL
83012	2001 QQ_{167}	—	August 24, 2001	Haleakala	NEAT	·	1.2 km	MPC · JPL
83013	2001 QJ_{169}	—	August 26, 2001	Haleakala	NEAT	·	5.2 km	MPC · JPL
83014	2001 QZ_{169}	—	August 23, 2001	Socorro	LINEAR	·	6.5 km	MPC · JPL
83015	2001 QA_{170}	—	August 23, 2001	Socorro	LINEAR	·	2.0 km	MPC · JPL
83016	2001 QS_{170}	—	August 24, 2001	Socorro	LINEAR	EUN	2.5 km	MPC · JPL
83017	2001 QT_{170}	—	August 24, 2001	Socorro	LINEAR	HOF	5.8 km	MPC · JPL
83018	2001 QP_{173}	—	August 25, 2001	Socorro	LINEAR	EOS	3.2 km	MPC · JPL
83019	2001 QJ_{174}	—	August 25, 2001	Socorro	LINEAR	V	1.4 km	MPC · JPL
83020	2001 QG_{177}	—	August 21, 2001	Haleakala	NEAT	·	2.8 km	MPC · JPL
83021	2001 QT_{177}	—	August 25, 2001	Palomar	NEAT	HYG	8.3 km	MPC · JPL
83022	2001 QA_{178}	—	August 26, 2001	Palomar	NEAT	·	2.7 km	MPC · JPL
83023	2001 QG_{178}	—	August 24, 2001	Kvistaberg	Uppsala-DLR Asteroid Survey	·	9.3 km	MPC · JPL
83024	2001 QQ_{178}	—	August 27, 2001	Palomar	NEAT	·	3.1 km	MPC · JPL
83025	2001 QJ_{179}	—	August 28, 2001	Palomar	NEAT	·	5.6 km	MPC · JPL
83026	2001 QZ_{179}	—	August 25, 2001	Palomar	NEAT	·	2.9 km	MPC · JPL
83027	2001 QB_{180}	—	August 25, 2001	Palomar	NEAT	·	5.1 km	MPC · JPL
83028	2001 QC_{180}	—	August 25, 2001	Palomar	NEAT	·	4.7 km	MPC · JPL
83029	2001 QB_{181}	—	August 26, 2001	Palomar	NEAT	AGN	3.3 km	MPC · JPL
83030	2001 QC_{181}	—	August 26, 2001	Palomar	NEAT	·	3.5 km	MPC · JPL
83031	2001 QJ_{181}	—	August 28, 2001	Palomar	NEAT	HYG	7.4 km	MPC · JPL
83032	2001 QN_{181}	—	August 31, 2001	Palomar	NEAT	·	2.2 km	MPC · JPL
83033	2001 QD_{182}	—	August 30, 2001	Palomar	NEAT	·	5.0 km	MPC · JPL
83034	2001 QT_{183}	—	August 24, 2001	Socorro	LINEAR	·	4.4 km	MPC · JPL
83035	2001 QY_{183}	—	August 21, 2001	Kitt Peak	Spacewatch	THM	4.8 km	MPC · JPL
83036	2001 QC_{185}	—	August 21, 2001	Socorro	LINEAR	ARM	8.6 km	MPC · JPL
83037	2001 QC_{188}	—	August 21, 2001	Haleakala	NEAT	·	3.7 km	MPC · JPL
83038	2001 QN_{190}	—	August 22, 2001	Socorro	LINEAR	PHO	2.5 km	MPC · JPL
83039	2001 QU_{191}	—	August 22, 2001	Socorro	LINEAR	·	6.2 km	MPC · JPL
83040	2001 QS_{192}	—	August 22, 2001	Socorro	LINEAR	·	4.6 km	MPC · JPL
83041	2001 QT_{193}	—	August 22, 2001	Socorro	LINEAR	·	7.7 km	MPC · JPL
83042	2001 QV_{193}	—	August 22, 2001	Socorro	LINEAR	(1118)	11 km	MPC · JPL
83043	2001 QT_{194}	—	August 22, 2001	Socorro	LINEAR	·	7.7 km	MPC · JPL
83044	2001 QA_{195}	—	August 22, 2001	Socorro	LINEAR	·	4.1 km	MPC · JPL
83045	2001 QC_{195}	—	August 22, 2001	Socorro	LINEAR	·	8.3 km	MPC · JPL
83046	2001 QW_{195}	—	August 22, 2001	Socorro	LINEAR	·	8.4 km	MPC · JPL
83047	2001 QX_{195}	—	August 22, 2001	Socorro	LINEAR	·	7.1 km	MPC · JPL
83048	2001 QF_{196}	—	August 22, 2001	Socorro	LINEAR	·	3.3 km	MPC · JPL
83049	2001 QX_{196}	—	August 22, 2001	Haleakala	NEAT	·	5.1 km	MPC · JPL
83050	2001 QQ_{197}	—	August 22, 2001	Socorro	LINEAR	·	3.6 km	MPC · JPL
83051	2001 QL_{200}	—	August 22, 2001	Palomar	NEAT	·	13 km	MPC · JPL
83052	2001 QX_{200}	—	August 22, 2001	Socorro	LINEAR	·	5.5 km	MPC · JPL
83053	2001 QP_{201}	—	August 22, 2001	Kitt Peak	Spacewatch	EOS	4.4 km	MPC · JPL
83054	2001 QC_{202}	—	August 23, 2001	Kitt Peak	Spacewatch	HOF	5.2 km	MPC · JPL
83055	2001 QN_{202}	—	August 23, 2001	Anderson Mesa	LONEOS	·	6.5 km	MPC · JPL
83056	2001 QT_{202}	—	August 23, 2001	Anderson Mesa	LONEOS	EOS	4.5 km	MPC · JPL
83057	2001 QJ_{205}	—	August 23, 2001	Anderson Mesa	LONEOS	·	4.3 km	MPC · JPL
83058	2001 QL_{207}	—	August 23, 2001	Anderson Mesa	LONEOS	KOR	3.1 km	MPC · JPL
83059	2001 QP_{207}	—	August 23, 2001	Anderson Mesa	LONEOS	·	3.1 km	MPC · JPL
83060	2001 QD_{210}	—	August 23, 2001	Kitt Peak	Spacewatch	MAR	2.2 km	MPC · JPL
83061	2001 QQ_{210}	—	August 23, 2001	Anderson Mesa	LONEOS	·	8.4 km	MPC · JPL
83062	2001 QA_{212}	—	August 23, 2001	Anderson Mesa	LONEOS	·	3.2 km	MPC · JPL
83063	2001 QF_{212}	—	August 23, 2001	Anderson Mesa	LONEOS	·	5.4 km	MPC · JPL
83064	2001 QG_{212}	—	August 23, 2001	Anderson Mesa	LONEOS	·	4.3 km	MPC · JPL
83065	2001 QW_{212}	—	August 23, 2001	Anderson Mesa	LONEOS	KOR	3.3 km	MPC · JPL
83066	2001 QX_{212}	—	August 23, 2001	Anderson Mesa	LONEOS	HYG	4.6 km	MPC · JPL
83067	2001 QB_{213}	—	August 23, 2001	Anderson Mesa	LONEOS	·	3.4 km	MPC · JPL
83068	2001 QD_{213}	—	August 23, 2001	Anderson Mesa	LONEOS	·	6.0 km	MPC · JPL
83069	2001 QJ_{213}	—	August 23, 2001	Anderson Mesa	LONEOS	MAR	2.6 km	MPC · JPL
83070	2001 QK_{213}	—	August 23, 2001	Anderson Mesa	LONEOS	·	4.2 km	MPC · JPL
83071	2001 QO_{214}	—	August 23, 2001	Anderson Mesa	LONEOS	·	5.4 km	MPC · JPL
83072	2001 QT_{215}	—	August 23, 2001	Anderson Mesa	LONEOS	NAE	5.9 km	MPC · JPL
83073	2001 QE_{216}	—	August 23, 2001	Anderson Mesa	LONEOS	KOR	2.5 km	MPC · JPL
83074	2001 QP_{216}	—	August 23, 2001	Anderson Mesa	LONEOS	KOR	2.5 km	MPC · JPL
83075	2001 QN_{217}	—	August 23, 2001	Anderson Mesa	LONEOS	(12739)	2.4 km	MPC · JPL
83076	2001 QB_{218}	—	August 23, 2001	Anderson Mesa	LONEOS	·	4.5 km	MPC · JPL
83077	2001 QQ_{218}	—	August 23, 2001	Anderson Mesa	LONEOS	·	2.3 km	MPC · JPL
83078	2001 QS_{221}	—	August 24, 2001	Palomar	NEAT	·	6.0 km	MPC · JPL
83079	2001 QN_{222}	—	August 24, 2001	Anderson Mesa	LONEOS	EOS	5.4 km	MPC · JPL
83080	2001 QG_{223}	—	August 24, 2001	Anderson Mesa	LONEOS	·	3.6 km	MPC · JPL
83081	2001 QB_{225}	—	August 24, 2001	Palomar	NEAT	·	3.1 km	MPC · JPL
83082	2001 QA_{226}	—	August 24, 2001	Anderson Mesa	LONEOS	·	3.1 km	MPC · JPL
83083	2001 QC_{226}	—	August 24, 2001	Anderson Mesa	LONEOS	·	3.7 km	MPC · JPL
83084	2001 QO_{227}	—	August 24, 2001	Anderson Mesa	LONEOS	·	7.4 km	MPC · JPL
83085	2001 QC_{228}	—	August 24, 2001	Anderson Mesa	LONEOS	·	4.0 km	MPC · JPL
83086	2001 QN_{228}	—	August 24, 2001	Anderson Mesa	LONEOS	·	4.9 km	MPC · JPL
83087	2001 QM_{229}	—	August 24, 2001	Anderson Mesa	LONEOS	·	2.4 km	MPC · JPL
83088	2001 QG_{230}	—	August 24, 2001	Anderson Mesa	LONEOS	·	3.2 km	MPC · JPL
83089	2001 QP_{230}	—	August 24, 2001	Anderson Mesa	LONEOS	·	3.5 km	MPC · JPL
83090	2001 QG_{232}	—	August 24, 2001	Desert Eagle	W. K. Y. Yeung	THM	6.0 km	MPC · JPL
83091	2001 QJ_{232}	—	August 24, 2001	Desert Eagle	W. K. Y. Yeung	·	3.3 km	MPC · JPL
83092	2001 QZ_{232}	—	August 24, 2001	Socorro	LINEAR	KOR	2.9 km	MPC · JPL
83093	2001 QR_{233}	—	August 24, 2001	Socorro	LINEAR	·	4.9 km	MPC · JPL
83094	2001 QS_{233}	—	August 24, 2001	Socorro	LINEAR	·	5.8 km	MPC · JPL
83095	2001 QZ_{233}	—	August 24, 2001	Socorro	LINEAR	KOR	2.6 km	MPC · JPL
83096	2001 QF_{234}	—	August 24, 2001	Socorro	LINEAR	KOR	2.7 km	MPC · JPL
83097	2001 QA_{235}	—	August 24, 2001	Socorro	LINEAR	·	5.4 km	MPC · JPL
83098	2001 QZ_{235}	—	August 24, 2001	Socorro	LINEAR	·	3.4 km	MPC · JPL
83099	2001 QM_{236}	—	August 24, 2001	Socorro	LINEAR	·	3.1 km	MPC · JPL
83100	2001 QA_{237}	—	August 24, 2001	Socorro	LINEAR	·	8.1 km	MPC · JPL

== 83101–83200 ==
back to top

Designation			Discovery			Properties		Ref
Permanent	Provisional	Named after	Date	Site	Discoverer(s)	Category	Diam.	Ref
83101	2001 QD_{237}	—	August 24, 2001	Socorro	LINEAR	HYG	7.2 km	MPC · JPL
83102	2001 QU_{237}	—	August 24, 2001	Socorro	LINEAR	·	3.6 km	MPC · JPL
83103	2001 QA_{238}	—	August 24, 2001	Socorro	LINEAR	EOS	5.6 km	MPC · JPL
83104	2001 QK_{238}	—	August 24, 2001	Socorro	LINEAR	KOR	3.4 km	MPC · JPL
83105	2001 QN_{238}	—	August 24, 2001	Socorro	LINEAR	·	10 km	MPC · JPL
83106	2001 QO_{238}	—	August 24, 2001	Socorro	LINEAR	·	3.6 km	MPC · JPL
83107	2001 QZ_{238}	—	August 24, 2001	Socorro	LINEAR	·	3.5 km	MPC · JPL
83108	2001 QY_{239}	—	August 24, 2001	Socorro	LINEAR	HYG	4.7 km	MPC · JPL
83109	2001 QR_{240}	—	August 24, 2001	Socorro	LINEAR	AST	5.5 km	MPC · JPL
83110	2001 QY_{240}	—	August 24, 2001	Socorro	LINEAR	·	5.4 km	MPC · JPL
83111	2001 QG_{241}	—	August 24, 2001	Socorro	LINEAR	MAR	2.3 km	MPC · JPL
83112	2001 QO_{241}	—	August 24, 2001	Socorro	LINEAR	·	2.3 km	MPC · JPL
83113	2001 QP_{241}	—	August 24, 2001	Socorro	LINEAR	·	2.7 km	MPC · JPL
83114	2001 QT_{242}	—	August 24, 2001	Socorro	LINEAR	(5)	2.2 km	MPC · JPL
83115	2001 QB_{243}	—	August 24, 2001	Socorro	LINEAR	KOR	3.2 km	MPC · JPL
83116	2001 QE_{243}	—	August 24, 2001	Socorro	LINEAR	(21885)	7.2 km	MPC · JPL
83117	2001 QM_{243}	—	August 24, 2001	Socorro	LINEAR	·	1.9 km	MPC · JPL
83118	2001 QC_{244}	—	August 24, 2001	Socorro	LINEAR	SYL · CYB	8.7 km	MPC · JPL
83119	2001 QX_{244}	—	August 24, 2001	Socorro	LINEAR	·	7.6 km	MPC · JPL
83120	2001 QP_{246}	—	August 24, 2001	Socorro	LINEAR	·	1.6 km	MPC · JPL
83121	2001 QX_{247}	—	August 24, 2001	Socorro	LINEAR	·	3.3 km	MPC · JPL
83122	2001 QW_{248}	—	August 24, 2001	Socorro	LINEAR	THM	7.5 km	MPC · JPL
83123	2001 QL_{250}	—	August 24, 2001	Haleakala	NEAT	·	4.6 km	MPC · JPL
83124	2001 QO_{250}	—	August 24, 2001	Haleakala	NEAT	·	4.3 km	MPC · JPL
83125	2001 QQ_{251}	—	August 25, 2001	Socorro	LINEAR	V	1.3 km	MPC · JPL
83126	2001 QJ_{253}	—	August 25, 2001	Socorro	LINEAR	KOR	3.4 km	MPC · JPL
83127	2001 QC_{256}	—	August 25, 2001	Socorro	LINEAR	ERI	3.3 km	MPC · JPL
83128	2001 QV_{256}	—	August 25, 2001	Socorro	LINEAR	·	6.6 km	MPC · JPL
83129	2001 QY_{256}	—	August 25, 2001	Socorro	LINEAR	·	6.8 km	MPC · JPL
83130	2001 QW_{257}	—	August 25, 2001	Socorro	LINEAR	EOS	6.4 km	MPC · JPL
83131	2001 QY_{258}	—	August 25, 2001	Socorro	LINEAR	EOS	8.1 km	MPC · JPL
83132	2001 QQ_{259}	—	August 25, 2001	Socorro	LINEAR	EOS	5.7 km	MPC · JPL
83133	2001 QX_{259}	—	August 25, 2001	Socorro	LINEAR	·	4.8 km	MPC · JPL
83134	2001 QT_{260}	—	August 25, 2001	Socorro	LINEAR	EOS	5.9 km	MPC · JPL
83135	2001 QC_{261}	—	August 25, 2001	Socorro	LINEAR	EOS	4.1 km	MPC · JPL
83136	2001 QG_{261}	—	August 25, 2001	Socorro	LINEAR	URS	8.9 km	MPC · JPL
83137	2001 QL_{261}	—	August 25, 2001	Socorro	LINEAR	·	5.0 km	MPC · JPL
83138	2001 QR_{261}	—	August 25, 2001	Socorro	LINEAR	·	7.4 km	MPC · JPL
83139	2001 QK_{262}	—	August 25, 2001	Socorro	LINEAR	·	5.3 km	MPC · JPL
83140	2001 QQ_{262}	—	August 25, 2001	Palomar	NEAT	MAR	2.3 km	MPC · JPL
83141	2001 QZ_{262}	—	August 25, 2001	Desert Eagle	W. K. Y. Yeung	·	1.6 km	MPC · JPL
83142	2001 QN_{263}	—	August 25, 2001	Anderson Mesa	LONEOS	·	5.7 km	MPC · JPL
83143	2001 QS_{263}	—	August 25, 2001	Socorro	LINEAR	·	2.7 km	MPC · JPL
83144	2001 QT_{263}	—	August 25, 2001	Anderson Mesa	LONEOS	·	3.5 km	MPC · JPL
83145	2001 QS_{264}	—	August 26, 2001	Anderson Mesa	LONEOS	·	9.8 km	MPC · JPL
83146	2001 QJ_{265}	—	August 26, 2001	Desert Eagle	W. K. Y. Yeung	LIX	8.9 km	MPC · JPL
83147	2001 QP_{265}	—	August 26, 2001	Desert Eagle	W. K. Y. Yeung	·	5.5 km	MPC · JPL
83148	2001 QQ_{265}	—	August 26, 2001	Desert Eagle	W. K. Y. Yeung	EOS	3.9 km	MPC · JPL
83149	2001 QE_{266}	—	August 20, 2001	Socorro	LINEAR	VER	5.9 km	MPC · JPL
83150	2001 QA_{268}	—	August 20, 2001	Socorro	LINEAR	·	8.6 km	MPC · JPL
83151	2001 QD_{268}	—	August 20, 2001	Socorro	LINEAR	·	4.5 km	MPC · JPL
83152	2001 QS_{268}	—	August 20, 2001	Palomar	NEAT	·	8.2 km	MPC · JPL
83153	2001 QF_{269}	—	August 20, 2001	Haleakala	NEAT	EOS	5.9 km	MPC · JPL
83154	2001 QX_{270}	—	August 19, 2001	Socorro	LINEAR	·	5.9 km	MPC · JPL
83155	2001 QZ_{271}	—	August 19, 2001	Socorro	LINEAR	·	8.0 km	MPC · JPL
83156	2001 QB_{272}	—	August 19, 2001	Socorro	LINEAR	EUN	2.9 km	MPC · JPL
83157	2001 QR_{272}	—	August 19, 2001	Socorro	LINEAR	WIT	2.3 km	MPC · JPL
83158	2001 QB_{273}	—	August 19, 2001	Socorro	LINEAR	·	4.9 km	MPC · JPL
83159	2001 QQ_{273}	—	August 19, 2001	Socorro	LINEAR	·	4.2 km	MPC · JPL
83160	2001 QE_{274}	—	August 19, 2001	Socorro	LINEAR	·	6.5 km	MPC · JPL
83161	2001 QS_{275}	—	August 19, 2001	Socorro	LINEAR	·	3.3 km	MPC · JPL
83162	2001 QU_{275}	—	August 19, 2001	Socorro	LINEAR	·	5.8 km	MPC · JPL
83163	2001 QJ_{276}	—	August 19, 2001	Socorro	LINEAR	EOS	4.2 km	MPC · JPL
83164	2001 QE_{277}	—	August 19, 2001	Socorro	LINEAR	·	7.4 km	MPC · JPL
83165	2001 QH_{277}	—	August 19, 2001	Socorro	LINEAR	·	4.0 km	MPC · JPL
83166	2001 QR_{277}	—	August 19, 2001	Socorro	LINEAR	·	1.9 km	MPC · JPL
83167	2001 QO_{278}	—	August 19, 2001	Socorro	LINEAR	·	6.4 km	MPC · JPL
83168	2001 QY_{279}	—	August 19, 2001	Socorro	LINEAR	·	3.8 km	MPC · JPL
83169	2001 QR_{281}	—	August 19, 2001	Socorro	LINEAR	·	9.8 km	MPC · JPL
83170	2001 QZ_{281}	—	August 19, 2001	Anderson Mesa	LONEOS	·	10 km	MPC · JPL
83171	2001 QP_{283}	—	August 18, 2001	Socorro	LINEAR	·	4.0 km	MPC · JPL
83172	2001 QG_{284}	—	August 18, 2001	Palomar	NEAT	·	5.9 km	MPC · JPL
83173	2001 QP_{284}	—	August 30, 2001	Palomar	NEAT	LEO	3.8 km	MPC · JPL
83174	2001 QJ_{285}	—	August 23, 2001	Haleakala	NEAT	EOS	5.1 km	MPC · JPL
83175	2001 QS_{285}	—	August 23, 2001	Haleakala	NEAT	URS	7.8 km	MPC · JPL
83176	2001 QO_{286}	—	August 17, 2001	Palomar	NEAT	URS	7.6 km	MPC · JPL
83177	2001 QN_{287}	—	August 17, 2001	Socorro	LINEAR	·	5.7 km	MPC · JPL
83178	2001 QO_{287}	—	August 17, 2001	Socorro	LINEAR	·	2.7 km	MPC · JPL
83179	2001 QS_{287}	—	August 17, 2001	Socorro	LINEAR	·	2.4 km	MPC · JPL
83180	2001 QY_{287}	—	August 17, 2001	Socorro	LINEAR	HOF	5.3 km	MPC · JPL
83181	2001 QP_{289}	—	August 16, 2001	Socorro	LINEAR	KOR	2.9 km	MPC · JPL
83182	2001 QV_{291}	—	August 16, 2001	Socorro	LINEAR	·	1.4 km	MPC · JPL
83183	2001 QU_{292}	—	August 16, 2001	Palomar	NEAT	·	9.7 km	MPC · JPL
83184	2001 QA_{293}	—	August 16, 2001	Palomar	NEAT	·	4.6 km	MPC · JPL
83185	2001 QG_{294}	—	August 24, 2001	Socorro	LINEAR	·	2.6 km	MPC · JPL
83186	2001 QM_{296}	—	August 24, 2001	Socorro	LINEAR	·	3.4 km	MPC · JPL
83187	2001 QS_{296}	—	August 24, 2001	Socorro	LINEAR	·	2.7 km	MPC · JPL
83188	2001 QU_{296}	—	August 24, 2001	Anderson Mesa	LONEOS	·	8.2 km	MPC · JPL
83189	2001 QY_{296}	—	August 24, 2001	Socorro	LINEAR	EUN	2.7 km	MPC · JPL
83190	2001 QU_{323}	—	August 27, 2001	Anderson Mesa	LONEOS	EOS	4.5 km	MPC · JPL
83191	2001 QP_{327}	—	August 16, 2001	Socorro	LINEAR	·	3.7 km	MPC · JPL
83192	2001 QY_{327}	—	August 19, 2001	Socorro	LINEAR	PAD	4.9 km	MPC · JPL
83193	2001 QK_{330}	—	August 25, 2001	Socorro	LINEAR	·	5.5 km	MPC · JPL
83194	2001 QY_{330}	—	August 25, 2001	Anderson Mesa	LONEOS	GEF	3.0 km	MPC · JPL
83195	2001 RJ_{1}	—	September 7, 2001	Socorro	LINEAR	THM	6.1 km	MPC · JPL
83196	2001 RV_{1}	—	September 7, 2001	Socorro	LINEAR	·	4.3 km	MPC · JPL
83197	2001 RS_{3}	—	September 7, 2001	Socorro	LINEAR	·	2.3 km	MPC · JPL
83198	2001 RF_{4}	—	September 8, 2001	Socorro	LINEAR	·	3.8 km	MPC · JPL
83199	2001 RM_{5}	—	September 8, 2001	Socorro	LINEAR	·	2.7 km	MPC · JPL
83200	2001 RN_{6}	—	September 10, 2001	Desert Eagle	W. K. Y. Yeung	·	2.8 km	MPC · JPL

== 83201–83300 ==
back to top

Designation			Discovery			Properties		Ref
Permanent	Provisional	Named after	Date	Site	Discoverer(s)	Category	Diam.	Ref
83201	2001 RA_{7}	—	September 10, 2001	Desert Eagle	W. K. Y. Yeung	THM	7.4 km	MPC · JPL
83202	2001 RQ_{8}	—	September 8, 2001	Socorro	LINEAR	(12739)	3.2 km	MPC · JPL
83203	2001 RN_{11}	—	September 10, 2001	Desert Eagle	W. K. Y. Yeung	·	2.8 km	MPC · JPL
83204	2001 RJ_{12}	—	September 7, 2001	Socorro	LINEAR	HYG	5.7 km	MPC · JPL
83205	2001 RX_{12}	—	September 8, 2001	Socorro	LINEAR	EUN	2.3 km	MPC · JPL
83206	2001 RZ_{12}	—	September 9, 2001	Socorro	LINEAR	URS	11 km	MPC · JPL
83207	2001 RB_{15}	—	September 10, 2001	Socorro	LINEAR	·	3.6 km	MPC · JPL
83208	2001 RH_{15}	—	September 10, 2001	Socorro	LINEAR	·	4.6 km	MPC · JPL
83209	2001 RV_{16}	—	September 11, 2001	Desert Eagle	W. K. Y. Yeung	·	7.3 km	MPC · JPL
83210	2001 RH_{19}	—	September 7, 2001	Socorro	LINEAR	·	5.1 km	MPC · JPL
83211	2001 RB_{21}	—	September 7, 2001	Socorro	LINEAR	·	3.0 km	MPC · JPL
83212	2001 RU_{21}	—	September 7, 2001	Socorro	LINEAR	·	5.8 km	MPC · JPL
83213	2001 RD_{22}	—	September 7, 2001	Socorro	LINEAR	·	4.9 km	MPC · JPL
83214	2001 RO_{22}	—	September 7, 2001	Socorro	LINEAR	·	3.5 km	MPC · JPL
83215	2001 RT_{23}	—	September 7, 2001	Socorro	LINEAR	·	4.9 km	MPC · JPL
83216	2001 RA_{27}	—	September 7, 2001	Socorro	LINEAR	·	4.0 km	MPC · JPL
83217	2001 RF_{27}	—	September 7, 2001	Socorro	LINEAR	·	4.0 km	MPC · JPL
83218	2001 RP_{27}	—	September 7, 2001	Socorro	LINEAR	slow	8.1 km	MPC · JPL
83219	2001 RV_{27}	—	September 7, 2001	Socorro	LINEAR	(12739)	2.7 km	MPC · JPL
83220	2001 RW_{29}	—	September 7, 2001	Socorro	LINEAR	·	3.3 km	MPC · JPL
83221	2001 RP_{31}	—	September 7, 2001	Socorro	LINEAR	·	5.6 km	MPC · JPL
83222	2001 RU_{31}	—	September 8, 2001	Socorro	LINEAR	DOR	8.6 km	MPC · JPL
83223	2001 RA_{32}	—	September 8, 2001	Socorro	LINEAR	·	7.8 km	MPC · JPL
83224	2001 RA_{33}	—	September 8, 2001	Socorro	LINEAR	·	3.9 km	MPC · JPL
83225	2001 RS_{33}	—	September 8, 2001	Socorro	LINEAR	·	4.1 km	MPC · JPL
83226	2001 RH_{34}	—	September 8, 2001	Socorro	LINEAR	DOR	7.0 km	MPC · JPL
83227	2001 RS_{34}	—	September 8, 2001	Socorro	LINEAR	MAR	2.6 km	MPC · JPL
83228	2001 RF_{35}	—	September 8, 2001	Socorro	LINEAR	·	6.8 km	MPC · JPL
83229	2001 RK_{36}	—	September 8, 2001	Socorro	LINEAR	EOS	4.8 km	MPC · JPL
83230	2001 RW_{37}	—	September 8, 2001	Socorro	LINEAR	·	5.0 km	MPC · JPL
83231	2001 RG_{38}	—	September 8, 2001	Socorro	LINEAR	·	2.2 km	MPC · JPL
83232	2001 RD_{41}	—	September 11, 2001	Socorro	LINEAR	·	5.7 km	MPC · JPL
83233	2001 RT_{41}	—	September 11, 2001	Socorro	LINEAR	·	5.6 km	MPC · JPL
83234	2001 RA_{44}	—	September 9, 2001	Palomar	NEAT	·	7.9 km	MPC · JPL
83235	2001 RB_{44}	—	September 9, 2001	Palomar	NEAT	KOR	3.2 km	MPC · JPL
83236	2001 RW_{44}	—	September 9, 2001	Palomar	NEAT	·	3.6 km	MPC · JPL
83237	2001 RV_{45}	—	September 14, 2001	Palomar	NEAT	MAR	2.5 km	MPC · JPL
83238	2001 RC_{46}	—	September 9, 2001	Goodricke-Pigott	R. A. Tucker	TEL	4.1 km	MPC · JPL
83239	2001 RH_{51}	—	September 11, 2001	Socorro	LINEAR	PHO	3.8 km	MPC · JPL
83240	2001 RG_{52}	—	September 12, 2001	Socorro	LINEAR	·	3.7 km	MPC · JPL
83241	2001 RH_{52}	—	September 12, 2001	Socorro	LINEAR	EOS	4.0 km	MPC · JPL
83242	2001 RU_{54}	—	September 12, 2001	Socorro	LINEAR	·	3.7 km	MPC · JPL
83243	2001 RY_{54}	—	September 12, 2001	Socorro	LINEAR	·	6.2 km	MPC · JPL
83244	2001 RH_{56}	—	September 12, 2001	Socorro	LINEAR	·	7.9 km	MPC · JPL
83245	2001 RQ_{57}	—	September 12, 2001	Socorro	LINEAR	NYS	2.8 km	MPC · JPL
83246	2001 RY_{57}	—	September 12, 2001	Socorro	LINEAR	THM	6.6 km	MPC · JPL
83247	2001 RZ_{58}	—	September 12, 2001	Socorro	LINEAR	·	3.7 km	MPC · JPL
83248	2001 RQ_{60}	—	September 12, 2001	Socorro	LINEAR	·	3.0 km	MPC · JPL
83249	2001 RD_{61}	—	September 12, 2001	Socorro	LINEAR	WIT	2.2 km	MPC · JPL
83250	2001 RF_{62}	—	September 12, 2001	Socorro	LINEAR	·	4.8 km	MPC · JPL
83251	2001 RF_{64}	—	September 10, 2001	Socorro	LINEAR	·	4.7 km	MPC · JPL
83252	2001 RG_{64}	—	September 10, 2001	Socorro	LINEAR	EOS	6.4 km	MPC · JPL
83253	2001 RH_{64}	—	September 10, 2001	Socorro	LINEAR	VER	6.0 km	MPC · JPL
83254	2001 RT_{65}	—	September 10, 2001	Socorro	LINEAR	·	9.2 km	MPC · JPL
83255	2001 RK_{66}	—	September 10, 2001	Socorro	LINEAR	·	2.7 km	MPC · JPL
83256	2001 RX_{68}	—	September 10, 2001	Socorro	LINEAR	EOS	4.5 km	MPC · JPL
83257	2001 RL_{69}	—	September 10, 2001	Socorro	LINEAR	·	7.0 km	MPC · JPL
83258	2001 RJ_{71}	—	September 10, 2001	Socorro	LINEAR	·	3.0 km	MPC · JPL
83259	2001 RN_{71}	—	September 10, 2001	Socorro	LINEAR	EOS	4.1 km	MPC · JPL
83260	2001 RP_{72}	—	September 10, 2001	Socorro	LINEAR	·	4.3 km	MPC · JPL
83261	2001 RB_{73}	—	September 10, 2001	Socorro	LINEAR	·	4.0 km	MPC · JPL
83262	2001 RF_{73}	—	September 10, 2001	Socorro	LINEAR	MAR	2.9 km	MPC · JPL
83263	2001 RQ_{74}	—	September 10, 2001	Socorro	LINEAR	PAD	5.0 km	MPC · JPL
83264	2001 RH_{75}	—	September 10, 2001	Socorro	LINEAR	·	9.9 km	MPC · JPL
83265	2001 RU_{76}	—	September 10, 2001	Socorro	LINEAR	·	4.7 km	MPC · JPL
83266	2001 RM_{77}	—	September 10, 2001	Socorro	LINEAR	·	3.6 km	MPC · JPL
83267	2001 RY_{77}	—	September 10, 2001	Socorro	LINEAR	KOR	3.0 km	MPC · JPL
83268	2001 RZ_{77}	—	September 10, 2001	Socorro	LINEAR	·	4.5 km	MPC · JPL
83269	2001 RG_{78}	—	September 10, 2001	Socorro	LINEAR	EOS	5.9 km	MPC · JPL
83270	2001 RK_{79}	—	September 10, 2001	Socorro	LINEAR	·	2.5 km	MPC · JPL
83271	2001 RL_{79}	—	September 10, 2001	Socorro	LINEAR	·	3.6 km	MPC · JPL
83272	2001 RT_{80}	—	September 14, 2001	Palomar	NEAT	·	5.8 km	MPC · JPL
83273	2001 RY_{80}	—	September 13, 2001	Palomar	NEAT	DOR	7.1 km	MPC · JPL
83274	2001 RJ_{81}	—	September 14, 2001	Palomar	NEAT	·	2.0 km	MPC · JPL
83275	2001 RQ_{81}	—	September 14, 2001	Palomar	NEAT	·	5.6 km	MPC · JPL
83276	2001 RJ_{83}	—	September 11, 2001	Anderson Mesa	LONEOS	EOS	4.8 km	MPC · JPL
83277	2001 RX_{83}	—	September 11, 2001	Anderson Mesa	LONEOS	·	3.4 km	MPC · JPL
83278	2001 RQ_{84}	—	September 11, 2001	Anderson Mesa	LONEOS	·	5.0 km	MPC · JPL
83279	2001 RC_{86}	—	September 11, 2001	Anderson Mesa	LONEOS	(5)	2.2 km	MPC · JPL
83280	2001 RD_{86}	—	September 11, 2001	Anderson Mesa	LONEOS	MAS	1.5 km	MPC · JPL
83281	2001 RH_{86}	—	September 11, 2001	Anderson Mesa	LONEOS	EOS	5.5 km	MPC · JPL
83282	2001 RD_{88}	—	September 11, 2001	Anderson Mesa	LONEOS	·	6.1 km	MPC · JPL
83283	2001 RY_{88}	—	September 11, 2001	Anderson Mesa	LONEOS	(5)	2.3 km	MPC · JPL
83284	2001 RJ_{89}	—	September 11, 2001	Anderson Mesa	LONEOS	EOS	5.6 km	MPC · JPL
83285	2001 RV_{89}	—	September 11, 2001	Anderson Mesa	LONEOS	AGN	2.9 km	MPC · JPL
83286	2001 RF_{90}	—	September 11, 2001	Anderson Mesa	LONEOS	·	2.9 km	MPC · JPL
83287	2001 RQ_{90}	—	September 11, 2001	Anderson Mesa	LONEOS	·	3.6 km	MPC · JPL
83288	2001 RH_{91}	—	September 11, 2001	Anderson Mesa	LONEOS	·	7.7 km	MPC · JPL
83289	2001 RR_{91}	—	September 11, 2001	Anderson Mesa	LONEOS	·	7.4 km	MPC · JPL
83290	2001 RF_{92}	—	September 11, 2001	Anderson Mesa	LONEOS	·	3.7 km	MPC · JPL
83291	2001 RH_{92}	—	September 11, 2001	Anderson Mesa	LONEOS	·	2.4 km	MPC · JPL
83292	2001 RD_{94}	—	September 11, 2001	Anderson Mesa	LONEOS	·	8.4 km	MPC · JPL
83293	2001 RL_{94}	—	September 11, 2001	Anderson Mesa	LONEOS	·	5.1 km	MPC · JPL
83294	2001 RD_{99}	—	September 12, 2001	Socorro	LINEAR	EOS	4.4 km	MPC · JPL
83295	2001 RP_{100}	—	September 12, 2001	Socorro	LINEAR	·	2.2 km	MPC · JPL
83296	2001 RB_{101}	—	September 12, 2001	Socorro	LINEAR	PAD	2.7 km	MPC · JPL
83297	2001 RP_{101}	—	September 12, 2001	Socorro	LINEAR	THM	6.4 km	MPC · JPL
83298	2001 RJ_{102}	—	September 12, 2001	Socorro	LINEAR	·	3.1 km	MPC · JPL
83299	2001 RB_{103}	—	September 12, 2001	Socorro	LINEAR	·	4.2 km	MPC · JPL
83300	2001 RQ_{103}	—	September 12, 2001	Socorro	LINEAR	·	5.2 km	MPC · JPL

== 83301–83400 ==
back to top

Designation			Discovery			Properties		Ref
Permanent	Provisional	Named after	Date	Site	Discoverer(s)	Category	Diam.	Ref
83301	2001 RJ_{104}	—	September 12, 2001	Socorro	LINEAR	NYS	2.4 km	MPC · JPL
83302	2001 RH_{106}	—	September 12, 2001	Socorro	LINEAR	·	5.3 km	MPC · JPL
83303	2001 RR_{106}	—	September 12, 2001	Socorro	LINEAR	·	2.3 km	MPC · JPL
83304	2001 RA_{108}	—	September 12, 2001	Socorro	LINEAR	·	5.2 km	MPC · JPL
83305	2001 RS_{108}	—	September 12, 2001	Socorro	LINEAR	·	3.7 km	MPC · JPL
83306	2001 RR_{109}	—	September 12, 2001	Socorro	LINEAR	·	2.8 km	MPC · JPL
83307	2001 RJ_{111}	—	September 12, 2001	Socorro	LINEAR	·	6.3 km	MPC · JPL
83308	2001 RJ_{112}	—	September 12, 2001	Socorro	LINEAR	·	4.0 km	MPC · JPL
83309	2001 RH_{113}	—	September 12, 2001	Socorro	LINEAR	WIT	1.8 km	MPC · JPL
83310	2001 RV_{113}	—	September 12, 2001	Socorro	LINEAR	·	5.6 km	MPC · JPL
83311	2001 RD_{114}	—	September 12, 2001	Socorro	LINEAR	·	4.3 km	MPC · JPL
83312	2001 RF_{114}	—	September 12, 2001	Socorro	LINEAR	·	6.6 km	MPC · JPL
83313	2001 RK_{115}	—	September 12, 2001	Socorro	LINEAR	KOR	3.3 km	MPC · JPL
83314	2001 RP_{115}	—	September 12, 2001	Socorro	LINEAR	KOR	3.5 km	MPC · JPL
83315	2001 RW_{118}	—	September 12, 2001	Socorro	LINEAR	VER	6.7 km	MPC · JPL
83316	2001 RK_{119}	—	September 12, 2001	Socorro	LINEAR	·	2.7 km	MPC · JPL
83317	2001 RQ_{121}	—	September 12, 2001	Socorro	LINEAR	·	4.3 km	MPC · JPL
83318	2001 RG_{122}	—	September 12, 2001	Socorro	LINEAR	KOR	3.8 km	MPC · JPL
83319	2001 RL_{124}	—	September 12, 2001	Socorro	LINEAR	EOS	3.8 km	MPC · JPL
83320	2001 RO_{124}	—	September 12, 2001	Socorro	LINEAR	KOR	2.4 km	MPC · JPL
83321	2001 RS_{124}	—	September 12, 2001	Socorro	LINEAR	EMA	5.6 km	MPC · JPL
83322	2001 RU_{124}	—	September 12, 2001	Socorro	LINEAR	·	3.5 km	MPC · JPL
83323	2001 RE_{125}	—	September 12, 2001	Socorro	LINEAR	·	3.7 km	MPC · JPL
83324	2001 RX_{127}	—	September 12, 2001	Socorro	LINEAR	·	3.6 km	MPC · JPL
83325	2001 RE_{128}	—	September 12, 2001	Socorro	LINEAR	·	5.5 km	MPC · JPL
83326	2001 RF_{128}	—	September 12, 2001	Socorro	LINEAR	·	3.5 km	MPC · JPL
83327	2001 RJ_{128}	—	September 12, 2001	Socorro	LINEAR	KOR	2.9 km	MPC · JPL
83328	2001 RR_{128}	—	September 12, 2001	Socorro	LINEAR	·	5.6 km	MPC · JPL
83329	2001 RR_{130}	—	September 12, 2001	Socorro	LINEAR	·	5.9 km	MPC · JPL
83330	2001 RC_{131}	—	September 12, 2001	Socorro	LINEAR	·	4.7 km	MPC · JPL
83331	2001 RG_{131}	—	September 12, 2001	Socorro	LINEAR	·	7.2 km	MPC · JPL
83332	2001 RN_{131}	—	September 12, 2001	Socorro	LINEAR	·	4.9 km	MPC · JPL
83333	2001 RU_{131}	—	September 12, 2001	Socorro	LINEAR	·	2.6 km	MPC · JPL
83334	2001 RW_{131}	—	September 12, 2001	Socorro	LINEAR	·	2.3 km	MPC · JPL
83335	2001 RE_{132}	—	September 12, 2001	Socorro	LINEAR	·	5.3 km	MPC · JPL
83336	2001 RZ_{132}	—	September 12, 2001	Socorro	LINEAR	AGN	3.1 km	MPC · JPL
83337	2001 RG_{133}	—	September 12, 2001	Socorro	LINEAR	·	6.2 km	MPC · JPL
83338	2001 RH_{134}	—	September 12, 2001	Socorro	LINEAR	EOS	3.6 km	MPC · JPL
83339	2001 RB_{135}	—	September 12, 2001	Socorro	LINEAR	·	2.8 km	MPC · JPL
83340	2001 RJ_{135}	—	September 12, 2001	Socorro	LINEAR	·	4.9 km	MPC · JPL
83341	2001 RD_{136}	—	September 12, 2001	Socorro	LINEAR	AGN	2.8 km	MPC · JPL
83342	2001 RG_{136}	—	September 12, 2001	Socorro	LINEAR	·	5.4 km	MPC · JPL
83343	2001 RU_{136}	—	September 12, 2001	Socorro	LINEAR	EOS	3.7 km	MPC · JPL
83344	2001 RU_{139}	—	September 12, 2001	Socorro	LINEAR	·	5.2 km	MPC · JPL
83345	2001 RY_{140}	—	September 12, 2001	Socorro	LINEAR	CYB	9.1 km	MPC · JPL
83346	2001 RD_{141}	—	September 12, 2001	Socorro	LINEAR	·	5.1 km	MPC · JPL
83347	2001 RM_{141}	—	September 12, 2001	Socorro	LINEAR	EOS	5.2 km	MPC · JPL
83348	2001 RO_{145}	—	September 8, 2001	Socorro	LINEAR	·	6.5 km	MPC · JPL
83349	2001 RR_{146}	—	September 9, 2001	Socorro	LINEAR	·	2.9 km	MPC · JPL
83350	2001 RZ_{146}	—	September 9, 2001	Palomar	NEAT	EOS	3.5 km	MPC · JPL
83351	2001 RG_{147}	—	September 9, 2001	Anderson Mesa	LONEOS	·	2.6 km	MPC · JPL
83352	2001 RT_{148}	—	September 10, 2001	Anderson Mesa	LONEOS	·	2.7 km	MPC · JPL
83353	2001 RT_{149}	—	September 11, 2001	Anderson Mesa	LONEOS	EOS	4.3 km	MPC · JPL
83354	2001 RB_{151}	—	September 11, 2001	Anderson Mesa	LONEOS	·	4.5 km	MPC · JPL
83355	2001 RN_{151}	—	September 11, 2001	Anderson Mesa	LONEOS	EOS	4.7 km	MPC · JPL
83356	2001 RF_{153}	—	September 12, 2001	Socorro	LINEAR	·	4.2 km	MPC · JPL
83357	2001 RK_{153}	—	September 12, 2001	Socorro	LINEAR	·	5.3 km	MPC · JPL
83358	2001 RJ_{154}	—	September 4, 2001	Palomar	NEAT	·	3.6 km	MPC · JPL
83359	2001 RA_{155}	—	September 12, 2001	Socorro	LINEAR	·	4.5 km	MPC · JPL
83360 Catalina	2001 SH	Catalina	September 16, 2001	Fountain Hills	C. W. Juels, P. R. Holvorcem	·	5.8 km	MPC · JPL
83361	2001 SK	—	September 16, 2001	Fountain Hills	C. W. Juels, P. R. Holvorcem	·	8.6 km	MPC · JPL
83362 Sandukruit	2001 SH_{1}	Sandukruit	September 17, 2001	Desert Eagle	W. K. Y. Yeung	(1101)	7.7 km	MPC · JPL
83363 Yamwingwah	2001 SU_{1}	Yamwingwah	September 17, 2001	Desert Eagle	W. K. Y. Yeung	·	5.5 km	MPC · JPL
83364	2001 SV_{1}	—	September 17, 2001	Desert Eagle	W. K. Y. Yeung	HYG	6.5 km	MPC · JPL
83365	2001 SA_{2}	—	September 17, 2001	Desert Eagle	W. K. Y. Yeung	·	4.9 km	MPC · JPL
83366	2001 SF_{2}	—	September 17, 2001	Desert Eagle	W. K. Y. Yeung	·	5.9 km	MPC · JPL
83367	2001 SL_{2}	—	September 17, 2001	Desert Eagle	W. K. Y. Yeung	KOR	3.2 km	MPC · JPL
83368	2001 SF_{3}	—	September 17, 2001	Desert Eagle	W. K. Y. Yeung	·	3.7 km	MPC · JPL
83369	2001 SM_{3}	—	September 17, 2001	Desert Eagle	W. K. Y. Yeung	KOR	4.1 km	MPC · JPL
83370	2001 SL_{4}	—	September 17, 2001	Goodricke-Pigott	R. A. Tucker	·	7.4 km	MPC · JPL
83371	2001 SQ_{4}	—	September 18, 2001	Goodricke-Pigott	R. A. Tucker	·	7.4 km	MPC · JPL
83372	2001 SP_{5}	—	September 16, 2001	Socorro	LINEAR	·	3.6 km	MPC · JPL
83373	2001 SA_{9}	—	September 19, 2001	Fountain Hills	C. W. Juels, P. R. Holvorcem	·	11 km	MPC · JPL
83374	2001 SF_{9}	—	September 19, 2001	Fountain Hills	C. W. Juels, P. R. Holvorcem	slow	8.0 km	MPC · JPL
83375	2001 SC_{12}	—	September 16, 2001	Socorro	LINEAR	·	5.7 km	MPC · JPL
83376	2001 SD_{12}	—	September 16, 2001	Socorro	LINEAR	KOR	2.9 km	MPC · JPL
83377	2001 SW_{12}	—	September 16, 2001	Socorro	LINEAR	·	3.0 km	MPC · JPL
83378	2001 SG_{13}	—	September 16, 2001	Socorro	LINEAR	·	3.9 km	MPC · JPL
83379	2001 SQ_{13}	—	September 16, 2001	Socorro	LINEAR	·	3.9 km	MPC · JPL
83380	2001 SQ_{14}	—	September 16, 2001	Socorro	LINEAR	HOF	4.1 km	MPC · JPL
83381	2001 SW_{14}	—	September 16, 2001	Socorro	LINEAR	·	4.7 km	MPC · JPL
83382	2001 SE_{16}	—	September 16, 2001	Socorro	LINEAR	AGN	2.5 km	MPC · JPL
83383	2001 SG_{16}	—	September 16, 2001	Socorro	LINEAR	KOR	2.2 km	MPC · JPL
83384	2001 SQ_{16}	—	September 16, 2001	Socorro	LINEAR	·	4.1 km	MPC · JPL
83385	2001 SH_{17}	—	September 16, 2001	Socorro	LINEAR	KOR	4.2 km	MPC · JPL
83386	2001 SL_{18}	—	September 16, 2001	Socorro	LINEAR	MAS	1.5 km	MPC · JPL
83387	2001 SS_{19}	—	September 16, 2001	Socorro	LINEAR	KOR	3.1 km	MPC · JPL
83388	2001 SV_{19}	—	September 16, 2001	Socorro	LINEAR	·	2.9 km	MPC · JPL
83389	2001 SQ_{20}	—	September 16, 2001	Socorro	LINEAR	NYS	2.4 km	MPC · JPL
83390	2001 SK_{21}	—	September 16, 2001	Socorro	LINEAR	EOS	5.0 km	MPC · JPL
83391	2001 SH_{22}	—	September 16, 2001	Socorro	LINEAR	KOR	3.3 km	MPC · JPL
83392	2001 SU_{23}	—	September 16, 2001	Socorro	LINEAR	KOR	2.7 km	MPC · JPL
83393	2001 SM_{24}	—	September 16, 2001	Socorro	LINEAR	·	3.3 km	MPC · JPL
83394	2001 SH_{27}	—	September 16, 2001	Socorro	LINEAR	·	6.3 km	MPC · JPL
83395	2001 SP_{27}	—	September 16, 2001	Socorro	LINEAR	·	5.7 km	MPC · JPL
83396	2001 SU_{27}	—	September 16, 2001	Socorro	LINEAR	·	4.4 km	MPC · JPL
83397	2001 SN_{28}	—	September 16, 2001	Socorro	LINEAR	KOR	3.3 km	MPC · JPL
83398	2001 SF_{29}	—	September 16, 2001	Socorro	LINEAR	·	5.7 km	MPC · JPL
83399	2001 SS_{30}	—	September 16, 2001	Socorro	LINEAR	TIR	6.2 km	MPC · JPL
83400	2001 SS_{32}	—	September 16, 2001	Socorro	LINEAR	·	2.5 km	MPC · JPL

== 83401–83500 ==
back to top

Designation			Discovery			Properties		Ref
Permanent	Provisional	Named after	Date	Site	Discoverer(s)	Category	Diam.	Ref
83401	2001 SU_{32}	—	September 16, 2001	Socorro	LINEAR	EOS	3.4 km	MPC · JPL
83402	2001 SC_{33}	—	September 16, 2001	Socorro	LINEAR	KOR	3.5 km	MPC · JPL
83403	2001 SK_{33}	—	September 16, 2001	Socorro	LINEAR	·	2.6 km	MPC · JPL
83404	2001 ST_{33}	—	September 16, 2001	Socorro	LINEAR	KOR	3.5 km	MPC · JPL
83405	2001 SD_{35}	—	September 16, 2001	Socorro	LINEAR	·	3.8 km	MPC · JPL
83406	2001 SF_{35}	—	September 16, 2001	Socorro	LINEAR	KOR	3.1 km	MPC · JPL
83407	2001 SO_{36}	—	September 16, 2001	Socorro	LINEAR	·	3.6 km	MPC · JPL
83408	2001 SU_{36}	—	September 16, 2001	Socorro	LINEAR	·	4.5 km	MPC · JPL
83409	2001 SE_{37}	—	September 16, 2001	Socorro	LINEAR	·	4.5 km	MPC · JPL
83410	2001 SN_{37}	—	September 16, 2001	Socorro	LINEAR	GEF	3.9 km	MPC · JPL
83411	2001 SE_{38}	—	September 16, 2001	Socorro	LINEAR	EOS	4.0 km	MPC · JPL
83412	2001 SW_{38}	—	September 16, 2001	Socorro	LINEAR	·	3.9 km	MPC · JPL
83413	2001 SZ_{38}	—	September 16, 2001	Socorro	LINEAR	·	5.3 km	MPC · JPL
83414	2001 SA_{39}	—	September 16, 2001	Socorro	LINEAR	·	3.1 km	MPC · JPL
83415	2001 SR_{40}	—	September 16, 2001	Socorro	LINEAR	·	9.5 km	MPC · JPL
83416	2001 SH_{41}	—	September 16, 2001	Socorro	LINEAR	·	7.3 km	MPC · JPL
83417	2001 ST_{41}	—	September 16, 2001	Socorro	LINEAR	·	7.8 km	MPC · JPL
83418	2001 SG_{42}	—	September 16, 2001	Socorro	LINEAR	KOR	2.6 km	MPC · JPL
83419	2001 SA_{43}	—	September 16, 2001	Socorro	LINEAR	(29841)	3.3 km	MPC · JPL
83420	2001 SH_{43}	—	September 16, 2001	Socorro	LINEAR	·	4.0 km	MPC · JPL
83421	2001 ST_{43}	—	September 16, 2001	Socorro	LINEAR	(13314)	4.4 km	MPC · JPL
83422	2001 SV_{43}	—	September 16, 2001	Socorro	LINEAR	KOR	3.6 km	MPC · JPL
83423	2001 SA_{44}	—	September 16, 2001	Socorro	LINEAR	·	4.8 km	MPC · JPL
83424	2001 SC_{44}	—	September 16, 2001	Socorro	LINEAR	·	2.8 km	MPC · JPL
83425	2001 SP_{44}	—	September 16, 2001	Socorro	LINEAR	THM	7.3 km	MPC · JPL
83426	2001 SS_{44}	—	September 16, 2001	Socorro	LINEAR	·	7.7 km	MPC · JPL
83427	2001 SV_{44}	—	September 16, 2001	Socorro	LINEAR	KOR	4.3 km	MPC · JPL
83428	2001 SR_{45}	—	September 16, 2001	Socorro	LINEAR	·	6.3 km	MPC · JPL
83429	2001 SG_{46}	—	September 16, 2001	Socorro	LINEAR	·	2.7 km	MPC · JPL
83430	2001 SN_{46}	—	September 16, 2001	Socorro	LINEAR	·	3.9 km	MPC · JPL
83431	2001 SR_{47}	—	September 16, 2001	Socorro	LINEAR	·	4.9 km	MPC · JPL
83432	2001 SE_{48}	—	September 16, 2001	Socorro	LINEAR	MRX	2.5 km	MPC · JPL
83433	2001 SH_{50}	—	September 16, 2001	Socorro	LINEAR	·	2.0 km	MPC · JPL
83434	2001 SY_{50}	—	September 16, 2001	Socorro	LINEAR	·	2.2 km	MPC · JPL
83435	2001 SO_{53}	—	September 16, 2001	Socorro	LINEAR	EOS	4.9 km	MPC · JPL
83436	2001 SY_{54}	—	September 16, 2001	Socorro	LINEAR	EOS	5.3 km	MPC · JPL
83437	2001 SE_{55}	—	September 16, 2001	Socorro	LINEAR	·	8.5 km	MPC · JPL
83438	2001 SN_{55}	—	September 16, 2001	Socorro	LINEAR	·	3.3 km	MPC · JPL
83439	2001 SJ_{56}	—	September 16, 2001	Socorro	LINEAR	·	8.8 km	MPC · JPL
83440	2001 SK_{56}	—	September 16, 2001	Socorro	LINEAR	·	4.5 km	MPC · JPL
83441	2001 SL_{56}	—	September 16, 2001	Socorro	LINEAR	·	4.2 km	MPC · JPL
83442	2001 ST_{56}	—	September 16, 2001	Socorro	LINEAR	·	4.1 km	MPC · JPL
83443	2001 SF_{57}	—	September 16, 2001	Socorro	LINEAR	EOS	5.4 km	MPC · JPL
83444	2001 SA_{58}	—	September 17, 2001	Socorro	LINEAR	·	3.9 km	MPC · JPL
83445	2001 SF_{58}	—	September 17, 2001	Socorro	LINEAR	EOS	4.7 km	MPC · JPL
83446	2001 SL_{58}	—	September 17, 2001	Socorro	LINEAR	·	4.8 km	MPC · JPL
83447	2001 SX_{58}	—	September 17, 2001	Socorro	LINEAR	EOS	5.2 km	MPC · JPL
83448	2001 SX_{59}	—	September 17, 2001	Socorro	LINEAR	·	6.9 km	MPC · JPL
83449	2001 SM_{60}	—	September 17, 2001	Socorro	LINEAR	·	2.4 km	MPC · JPL
83450	2001 SP_{60}	—	September 17, 2001	Socorro	LINEAR	·	5.9 km	MPC · JPL
83451	2001 SR_{60}	—	September 17, 2001	Socorro	LINEAR	·	8.5 km	MPC · JPL
83452	2001 SG_{62}	—	September 17, 2001	Socorro	LINEAR	CYB	7.3 km	MPC · JPL
83453	2001 SS_{62}	—	September 17, 2001	Socorro	LINEAR	·	7.2 km	MPC · JPL
83454	2001 SY_{62}	—	September 17, 2001	Socorro	LINEAR	·	6.6 km	MPC · JPL
83455	2001 SB_{63}	—	September 17, 2001	Socorro	LINEAR	·	2.7 km	MPC · JPL
83456	2001 SD_{63}	—	September 17, 2001	Socorro	LINEAR	·	4.7 km	MPC · JPL
83457	2001 SG_{63}	—	September 17, 2001	Socorro	LINEAR	KOR	3.0 km	MPC · JPL
83458	2001 SN_{63}	—	September 17, 2001	Socorro	LINEAR	·	2.4 km	MPC · JPL
83459	2001 SS_{64}	—	September 17, 2001	Socorro	LINEAR	EOS	5.2 km	MPC · JPL
83460	2001 SQ_{65}	—	September 17, 2001	Socorro	LINEAR	·	4.0 km	MPC · JPL
83461	2001 SV_{66}	—	September 17, 2001	Socorro	LINEAR	·	3.4 km	MPC · JPL
83462	2001 SC_{68}	—	September 17, 2001	Socorro	LINEAR	EUN	2.8 km	MPC · JPL
83463	2001 SP_{69}	—	September 17, 2001	Socorro	LINEAR	EUN	3.2 km	MPC · JPL
83464 Irishmccalla	2001 SM_{73}	Irishmccalla	September 19, 2001	Goodricke-Pigott	R. A. Tucker	·	5.6 km	MPC · JPL
83465	2001 SV_{74}	—	September 19, 2001	Anderson Mesa	LONEOS	·	7.1 km	MPC · JPL
83466	2001 SB_{75}	—	September 19, 2001	Anderson Mesa	LONEOS	·	4.8 km	MPC · JPL
83467	2001 SE_{75}	—	September 19, 2001	Anderson Mesa	LONEOS	·	4.8 km	MPC · JPL
83468	2001 SP_{75}	—	September 19, 2001	Anderson Mesa	LONEOS	EOS	4.9 km	MPC · JPL
83469	2001 SV_{75}	—	September 19, 2001	Anderson Mesa	LONEOS	(194)	5.2 km	MPC · JPL
83470	2001 SF_{76}	—	September 16, 2001	Socorro	LINEAR	fast	4.4 km	MPC · JPL
83471	2001 SO_{76}	—	September 16, 2001	Socorro	LINEAR	PAD	3.7 km	MPC · JPL
83472	2001 SG_{78}	—	September 19, 2001	Socorro	LINEAR	·	5.1 km	MPC · JPL
83473	2001 SA_{79}	—	September 20, 2001	Socorro	LINEAR	EOS	4.7 km	MPC · JPL
83474	2001 SS_{79}	—	September 20, 2001	Socorro	LINEAR	·	6.8 km	MPC · JPL
83475	2001 SL_{80}	—	September 20, 2001	Socorro	LINEAR	URS	8.0 km	MPC · JPL
83476	2001 SL_{81}	—	September 20, 2001	Socorro	LINEAR	·	4.4 km	MPC · JPL
83477	2001 SD_{82}	—	September 20, 2001	Socorro	LINEAR	CYB	7.2 km	MPC · JPL
83478	2001 ST_{83}	—	September 20, 2001	Socorro	LINEAR	EOS	3.2 km	MPC · JPL
83479	2001 SW_{83}	—	September 20, 2001	Socorro	LINEAR	·	6.8 km	MPC · JPL
83480	2001 SE_{86}	—	September 20, 2001	Socorro	LINEAR	·	4.0 km	MPC · JPL
83481	2001 SO_{88}	—	September 20, 2001	Socorro	LINEAR	KOR	2.2 km	MPC · JPL
83482	2001 SO_{90}	—	September 20, 2001	Socorro	LINEAR	·	6.0 km	MPC · JPL
83483	2001 SC_{93}	—	September 20, 2001	Socorro	LINEAR	·	3.1 km	MPC · JPL
83484	2001 SH_{93}	—	September 20, 2001	Socorro	LINEAR	HYG	5.3 km	MPC · JPL
83485	2001 SY_{95}	—	September 20, 2001	Socorro	LINEAR	(159)	4.6 km	MPC · JPL
83486	2001 SK_{97}	—	September 20, 2001	Socorro	LINEAR	·	4.9 km	MPC · JPL
83487	2001 SY_{97}	—	September 20, 2001	Socorro	LINEAR	EOS	3.7 km	MPC · JPL
83488	2001 SK_{105}	—	September 20, 2001	Socorro	LINEAR	·	8.7 km	MPC · JPL
83489	2001 SW_{105}	—	September 20, 2001	Socorro	LINEAR	·	5.4 km	MPC · JPL
83490	2001 SB_{106}	—	September 20, 2001	Socorro	LINEAR	EOS	5.5 km	MPC · JPL
83491	2001 SA_{107}	—	September 20, 2001	Socorro	LINEAR	·	9.0 km	MPC · JPL
83492	2001 SE_{107}	—	September 20, 2001	Socorro	LINEAR	·	5.1 km	MPC · JPL
83493	2001 SN_{111}	—	September 20, 2001	Socorro	LINEAR	·	6.3 km	MPC · JPL
83494	2001 SZ_{113}	—	September 20, 2001	Desert Eagle	W. K. Y. Yeung	·	5.0 km	MPC · JPL
83495	2001 ST_{114}	—	September 20, 2001	Desert Eagle	W. K. Y. Yeung	·	4.1 km	MPC · JPL
83496	2001 SJ_{115}	—	September 20, 2001	Desert Eagle	W. K. Y. Yeung	KOR	2.6 km	MPC · JPL
83497	2001 SV_{116}	—	September 16, 2001	Socorro	LINEAR	·	5.7 km	MPC · JPL
83498	2001 SY_{116}	—	September 16, 2001	Socorro	LINEAR	·	4.4 km	MPC · JPL
83499	2001 SJ_{117}	—	September 16, 2001	Socorro	LINEAR	·	3.5 km	MPC · JPL
83500	2001 SA_{118}	—	September 16, 2001	Socorro	LINEAR	·	4.2 km	MPC · JPL

== 83501–83600 ==
back to top

Designation			Discovery			Properties		Ref
Permanent	Provisional	Named after	Date	Site	Discoverer(s)	Category	Diam.	Ref
83501	2001 SQ_{118}	—	September 16, 2001	Socorro	LINEAR	(194)	3.7 km	MPC · JPL
83502	2001 SD_{120}	—	September 16, 2001	Socorro	LINEAR	·	4.0 km	MPC · JPL
83503	2001 SH_{121}	—	September 16, 2001	Socorro	LINEAR	EOS	5.5 km	MPC · JPL
83504	2001 SF_{123}	—	September 16, 2001	Socorro	LINEAR	PAD	5.2 km	MPC · JPL
83505	2001 SF_{124}	—	September 16, 2001	Socorro	LINEAR	HYG	6.0 km	MPC · JPL
83506	2001 SU_{124}	—	September 16, 2001	Socorro	LINEAR	EOS	4.5 km	MPC · JPL
83507	2001 SY_{126}	—	September 16, 2001	Socorro	LINEAR	KOR	3.0 km	MPC · JPL
83508	2001 SK_{127}	—	September 16, 2001	Socorro	LINEAR	·	2.6 km	MPC · JPL
83509	2001 SR_{127}	—	September 16, 2001	Socorro	LINEAR	·	3.3 km	MPC · JPL
83510	2001 SW_{127}	—	September 16, 2001	Socorro	LINEAR	·	2.5 km	MPC · JPL
83511	2001 SH_{128}	—	September 16, 2001	Socorro	LINEAR	·	8.4 km	MPC · JPL
83512	2001 SU_{128}	—	September 16, 2001	Socorro	LINEAR	EOS	5.6 km	MPC · JPL
83513	2001 SC_{131}	—	September 16, 2001	Socorro	LINEAR	·	4.2 km	MPC · JPL
83514	2001 SU_{131}	—	September 16, 2001	Socorro	LINEAR	EOS	3.8 km	MPC · JPL
83515	2001 SF_{132}	—	September 16, 2001	Socorro	LINEAR	KOR	2.6 km	MPC · JPL
83516	2001 SA_{133}	—	September 16, 2001	Socorro	LINEAR	EOS	3.8 km	MPC · JPL
83517	2001 SF_{133}	—	September 16, 2001	Socorro	LINEAR	EOS	4.2 km	MPC · JPL
83518	2001 SZ_{135}	—	September 16, 2001	Socorro	LINEAR	·	4.5 km	MPC · JPL
83519	2001 SE_{139}	—	September 16, 2001	Socorro	LINEAR	KOR	2.3 km	MPC · JPL
83520	2001 SX_{142}	—	September 16, 2001	Socorro	LINEAR	·	6.7 km	MPC · JPL
83521	2001 SZ_{144}	—	September 16, 2001	Socorro	LINEAR	·	5.5 km	MPC · JPL
83522	2001 SZ_{146}	—	September 16, 2001	Socorro	LINEAR	·	5.1 km	MPC · JPL
83523	2001 SC_{147}	—	September 16, 2001	Socorro	LINEAR	·	3.5 km	MPC · JPL
83524	2001 ST_{148}	—	September 17, 2001	Socorro	LINEAR	TEL	4.5 km	MPC · JPL
83525	2001 SO_{149}	—	September 17, 2001	Socorro	LINEAR	·	6.1 km	MPC · JPL
83526	2001 SV_{149}	—	September 17, 2001	Socorro	LINEAR	·	5.4 km	MPC · JPL
83527	2001 SW_{149}	—	September 17, 2001	Socorro	LINEAR	TEL	3.3 km	MPC · JPL
83528	2001 SL_{152}	—	September 17, 2001	Socorro	LINEAR	AGN ·	5.1 km	MPC · JPL
83529	2001 SM_{153}	—	September 17, 2001	Socorro	LINEAR	·	7.7 km	MPC · JPL
83530	2001 SY_{155}	—	September 17, 2001	Socorro	LINEAR	KOR	3.1 km	MPC · JPL
83531	2001 SC_{157}	—	September 17, 2001	Socorro	LINEAR	EOS	5.2 km	MPC · JPL
83532	2001 SV_{157}	—	September 17, 2001	Socorro	LINEAR	·	3.9 km	MPC · JPL
83533	2001 SA_{158}	—	September 17, 2001	Socorro	LINEAR	GEF	3.3 km	MPC · JPL
83534	2001 SO_{160}	—	September 17, 2001	Socorro	LINEAR	·	6.6 km	MPC · JPL
83535	2001 SX_{162}	—	September 17, 2001	Socorro	LINEAR	·	4.5 km	MPC · JPL
83536	2001 SF_{163}	—	September 17, 2001	Socorro	LINEAR	EOS	5.9 km	MPC · JPL
83537	2001 SU_{163}	—	September 17, 2001	Socorro	LINEAR	·	4.7 km	MPC · JPL
83538	2001 SD_{164}	—	September 17, 2001	Socorro	LINEAR	·	9.1 km	MPC · JPL
83539	2001 SF_{164}	—	September 17, 2001	Socorro	LINEAR	·	6.8 km	MPC · JPL
83540	2001 SN_{164}	—	September 17, 2001	Socorro	LINEAR	·	5.1 km	MPC · JPL
83541	2001 SP_{164}	—	September 17, 2001	Socorro	LINEAR	·	8.4 km	MPC · JPL
83542	2001 SP_{166}	—	September 19, 2001	Socorro	LINEAR	KOR	2.4 km	MPC · JPL
83543	2001 SM_{167}	—	September 19, 2001	Socorro	LINEAR	·	7.1 km	MPC · JPL
83544	2001 SS_{169}	—	September 17, 2001	Palomar	NEAT	·	10 km	MPC · JPL
83545	2001 SZ_{171}	—	September 16, 2001	Socorro	LINEAR	NEM	4.0 km	MPC · JPL
83546	2001 SG_{172}	—	September 16, 2001	Socorro	LINEAR	·	5.3 km	MPC · JPL
83547	2001 SP_{173}	—	September 16, 2001	Socorro	LINEAR	·	9.6 km	MPC · JPL
83548	2001 SJ_{174}	—	September 16, 2001	Socorro	LINEAR	·	2.6 km	MPC · JPL
83549	2001 SR_{174}	—	September 16, 2001	Socorro	LINEAR	·	5.5 km	MPC · JPL
83550	2001 SW_{174}	—	September 16, 2001	Socorro	LINEAR	EOS	5.1 km	MPC · JPL
83551	2001 SZ_{175}	—	September 16, 2001	Socorro	LINEAR	·	6.0 km	MPC · JPL
83552	2001 SS_{176}	—	September 16, 2001	Socorro	LINEAR	·	3.5 km	MPC · JPL
83553	2001 SW_{177}	—	September 16, 2001	Socorro	LINEAR	·	4.5 km	MPC · JPL
83554	2001 SY_{177}	—	September 16, 2001	Socorro	LINEAR	EOS	4.3 km	MPC · JPL
83555	2001 SV_{181}	—	September 19, 2001	Socorro	LINEAR	·	3.4 km	MPC · JPL
83556	2001 SU_{183}	—	September 19, 2001	Socorro	LINEAR	HOF	6.7 km	MPC · JPL
83557	2001 SP_{184}	—	September 19, 2001	Socorro	LINEAR	·	6.5 km	MPC · JPL
83558	2001 SG_{187}	—	September 19, 2001	Socorro	LINEAR	KOR	2.9 km	MPC · JPL
83559	2001 SR_{195}	—	September 19, 2001	Socorro	LINEAR	EOS	4.6 km	MPC · JPL
83560	2001 SW_{203}	—	September 19, 2001	Socorro	LINEAR	·	7.6 km	MPC · JPL
83561	2001 SX_{205}	—	September 19, 2001	Socorro	LINEAR	NEM	4.1 km	MPC · JPL
83562	2001 SJ_{210}	—	September 19, 2001	Socorro	LINEAR	THM	4.3 km	MPC · JPL
83563	2001 SO_{211}	—	September 19, 2001	Socorro	LINEAR	HYG	6.7 km	MPC · JPL
83564	2001 SD_{212}	—	September 19, 2001	Socorro	LINEAR	·	3.2 km	MPC · JPL
83565	2001 SS_{213}	—	September 19, 2001	Socorro	LINEAR	KOR	3.1 km	MPC · JPL
83566	2001 SG_{214}	—	September 19, 2001	Socorro	LINEAR	·	4.9 km	MPC · JPL
83567	2001 SF_{218}	—	September 19, 2001	Socorro	LINEAR	EOS	4.3 km	MPC · JPL
83568	2001 SK_{218}	—	September 19, 2001	Socorro	LINEAR	·	3.9 km	MPC · JPL
83569	2001 SZ_{219}	—	September 19, 2001	Socorro	LINEAR	THM	5.9 km	MPC · JPL
83570	2001 SD_{224}	—	September 19, 2001	Socorro	LINEAR	·	7.6 km	MPC · JPL
83571	2001 SH_{225}	—	September 19, 2001	Socorro	LINEAR	slow	5.9 km	MPC · JPL
83572	2001 SS_{225}	—	September 19, 2001	Socorro	LINEAR	KOR	2.5 km	MPC · JPL
83573	2001 SW_{225}	—	September 19, 2001	Socorro	LINEAR	EOS	5.6 km	MPC · JPL
83574	2001 SJ_{226}	—	September 19, 2001	Socorro	LINEAR	·	5.3 km	MPC · JPL
83575	2001 SK_{229}	—	September 19, 2001	Socorro	LINEAR	EOS	3.8 km	MPC · JPL
83576	2001 SM_{229}	—	September 19, 2001	Socorro	LINEAR	·	3.4 km	MPC · JPL
83577	2001 SD_{230}	—	September 19, 2001	Socorro	LINEAR	(18466)	4.9 km	MPC · JPL
83578	2001 SK_{230}	—	September 19, 2001	Socorro	LINEAR	THM	7.0 km	MPC · JPL
83579	2001 SD_{231}	—	September 19, 2001	Socorro	LINEAR	·	1.9 km	MPC · JPL
83580	2001 SR_{231}	—	September 19, 2001	Socorro	LINEAR	·	5.6 km	MPC · JPL
83581	2001 SX_{232}	—	September 19, 2001	Socorro	LINEAR	·	6.9 km	MPC · JPL
83582	2001 SJ_{233}	—	September 19, 2001	Socorro	LINEAR	·	5.0 km	MPC · JPL
83583	2001 SP_{233}	—	September 19, 2001	Socorro	LINEAR	·	5.5 km	MPC · JPL
83584	2001 SR_{237}	—	September 19, 2001	Socorro	LINEAR	·	4.7 km	MPC · JPL
83585	2001 SC_{238}	—	September 19, 2001	Socorro	LINEAR	·	4.4 km	MPC · JPL
83586	2001 SA_{241}	—	September 19, 2001	Socorro	LINEAR	KOR	3.1 km	MPC · JPL
83587	2001 SA_{242}	—	September 19, 2001	Socorro	LINEAR	·	3.1 km	MPC · JPL
83588	2001 SS_{242}	—	September 19, 2001	Socorro	LINEAR	·	5.9 km	MPC · JPL
83589	2001 SO_{246}	—	September 19, 2001	Socorro	LINEAR	KOR	2.9 km	MPC · JPL
83590	2001 SE_{247}	—	September 19, 2001	Socorro	LINEAR	VER	6.0 km	MPC · JPL
83591	2001 SA_{248}	—	September 19, 2001	Socorro	LINEAR	·	4.8 km	MPC · JPL
83592	2001 SO_{249}	—	September 19, 2001	Socorro	LINEAR	·	4.3 km	MPC · JPL
83593	2001 SB_{253}	—	September 19, 2001	Socorro	LINEAR	KOR	2.8 km	MPC · JPL
83594	2001 SS_{253}	—	September 19, 2001	Socorro	LINEAR	·	2.9 km	MPC · JPL
83595	2001 SX_{256}	—	September 19, 2001	Socorro	LINEAR	KOR	3.2 km	MPC · JPL
83596	2001 SC_{263}	—	September 25, 2001	Emerald Lane	L. Ball	·	4.2 km	MPC · JPL
83597	2001 SU_{263}	—	September 25, 2001	Fountain Hills	C. W. Juels, P. R. Holvorcem	·	5.0 km	MPC · JPL
83598 Aiweiwei	2001 SP_{265}	Aiweiwei	September 25, 2001	Desert Eagle	W. K. Y. Yeung	EOS	3.8 km	MPC · JPL
83599	2001 SE_{266}	—	September 25, 2001	Desert Eagle	W. K. Y. Yeung	·	11 km	MPC · JPL
83600 Yuchunshun	2001 SM_{266}	Yuchunshun	September 25, 2001	Desert Eagle	W. K. Y. Yeung	·	4.4 km	MPC · JPL

== 83601–83700 ==
back to top

Designation			Discovery			Properties		Ref
Permanent	Provisional	Named after	Date	Site	Discoverer(s)	Category	Diam.	Ref
83601	2001 SO_{266}	—	September 25, 2001	Desert Eagle	W. K. Y. Yeung	KOR · fast	3.9 km	MPC · JPL
83602	2001 SR_{266}	—	September 25, 2001	Desert Eagle	W. K. Y. Yeung	·	3.6 km	MPC · JPL
83603	2001 SO_{268}	—	September 19, 2001	Kitt Peak	Spacewatch	·	3.2 km	MPC · JPL
83604	2001 SG_{270}	—	September 26, 2001	Fountain Hills	C. W. Juels, P. R. Holvorcem	·	15 km	MPC · JPL
83605	2001 SJ_{270}	—	September 26, 2001	Fountain Hills	C. W. Juels, P. R. Holvorcem	·	6.7 km	MPC · JPL
83606	2001 SS_{270}	—	September 16, 2001	Palomar	NEAT	GEF	3.8 km	MPC · JPL
83607	2001 SC_{272}	—	September 20, 2001	Socorro	LINEAR	KOR	3.0 km	MPC · JPL
83608	2001 SK_{272}	—	September 21, 2001	Socorro	LINEAR	KOR	2.9 km	MPC · JPL
83609	2001 SE_{273}	—	September 24, 2001	Fountain Hills	C. W. Juels, P. R. Holvorcem	·	3.1 km	MPC · JPL
83610	2001 SZ_{274}	—	September 18, 2001	Kitt Peak	Spacewatch	·	3.1 km	MPC · JPL
83611	2001 SS_{277}	—	September 21, 2001	Anderson Mesa	LONEOS	·	9.8 km	MPC · JPL
83612	2001 SW_{281}	—	September 21, 2001	Anderson Mesa	LONEOS	(23255)	4.6 km	MPC · JPL
83613	2001 SR_{286}	—	September 22, 2001	Palomar	NEAT	EOS	5.5 km	MPC · JPL
83614	2001 SU_{286}	—	September 22, 2001	Palomar	NEAT	·	2.3 km	MPC · JPL
83615	2001 SE_{287}	—	September 22, 2001	Palomar	NEAT	·	4.8 km	MPC · JPL
83616	2001 SW_{287}	—	September 27, 2001	Palomar	NEAT	·	9.9 km	MPC · JPL
83617	2001 SX_{287}	—	September 27, 2001	Palomar	NEAT	BRA	6.3 km	MPC · JPL
83618	2001 SS_{289}	—	September 29, 2001	Palomar	NEAT	·	2.5 km	MPC · JPL
83619	2001 SZ_{291}	—	September 21, 2001	Anderson Mesa	LONEOS	·	3.1 km	MPC · JPL
83620	2001 SA_{293}	—	September 16, 2001	Socorro	LINEAR	·	7.5 km	MPC · JPL
83621	2001 SL_{307}	—	September 21, 2001	Socorro	LINEAR	·	5.7 km	MPC · JPL
83622	2001 SP_{308}	—	September 22, 2001	Socorro	LINEAR	·	3.9 km	MPC · JPL
83623	2001 SK_{312}	—	September 21, 2001	Socorro	LINEAR	KOR	2.8 km	MPC · JPL
83624	2001 SH_{313}	—	September 21, 2001	Socorro	LINEAR	·	5.6 km	MPC · JPL
83625	2001 SL_{313}	—	September 21, 2001	Socorro	LINEAR	EOS	4.0 km	MPC · JPL
83626	2001 SQ_{313}	—	September 21, 2001	Socorro	LINEAR	EOS	5.0 km	MPC · JPL
83627	2001 SN_{315}	—	September 25, 2001	Socorro	LINEAR	·	7.2 km	MPC · JPL
83628	2001 SV_{315}	—	September 25, 2001	Socorro	LINEAR	·	8.1 km	MPC · JPL
83629	2001 SY_{316}	—	September 24, 2001	Anderson Mesa	LONEOS	HNS	3.3 km	MPC · JPL
83630	2001 SD_{317}	—	September 25, 2001	Palomar	NEAT	·	4.7 km	MPC · JPL
83631	2001 SH_{317}	—	September 25, 2001	Palomar	NEAT	PAD	5.7 km	MPC · JPL
83632	2001 SE_{321}	—	September 25, 2001	Socorro	LINEAR	·	6.0 km	MPC · JPL
83633	2001 SF_{322}	—	September 25, 2001	Socorro	LINEAR	·	4.7 km	MPC · JPL
83634	2001 SO_{324}	—	September 16, 2001	Socorro	LINEAR	·	5.4 km	MPC · JPL
83635	2001 SF_{325}	—	September 16, 2001	Socorro	LINEAR	EOS	4.0 km	MPC · JPL
83636	2001 SO_{326}	—	September 18, 2001	Anderson Mesa	LONEOS	·	7.1 km	MPC · JPL
83637	2001 SY_{327}	—	September 18, 2001	Anderson Mesa	LONEOS	·	4.3 km	MPC · JPL
83638	2001 SG_{328}	—	September 19, 2001	Kitt Peak	Spacewatch	·	2.2 km	MPC · JPL
83639	2001 SH_{328}	—	September 19, 2001	Kitt Peak	Spacewatch	·	3.2 km	MPC · JPL
83640	2001 SW_{334}	—	September 20, 2001	Kitt Peak	Spacewatch	·	5.1 km	MPC · JPL
83641	2001 SO_{338}	—	September 20, 2001	Socorro	LINEAR	·	5.8 km	MPC · JPL
83642	2001 SA_{339}	—	September 21, 2001	Anderson Mesa	LONEOS	ADE	6.5 km	MPC · JPL
83643	2001 ST_{343}	—	September 22, 2001	Palomar	NEAT	HNS	2.5 km	MPC · JPL
83644	2001 SX_{343}	—	September 22, 2001	Palomar	NEAT	·	7.6 km	MPC · JPL
83645	2001 SL_{344}	—	September 23, 2001	Socorro	LINEAR	·	2.9 km	MPC · JPL
83646	2001 SK_{345}	—	September 23, 2001	Haleakala	NEAT	·	4.8 km	MPC · JPL
83647	2001 SH_{346}	—	September 25, 2001	Socorro	LINEAR	·	9.0 km	MPC · JPL
83648	2001 SM_{349}	—	September 17, 2001	Anderson Mesa	LONEOS	·	5.6 km	MPC · JPL
83649	2001 TU_{2}	—	October 6, 2001	Palomar	NEAT	·	4.0 km	MPC · JPL
83650	2001 TR_{3}	—	October 7, 2001	Palomar	NEAT	KOR	2.8 km	MPC · JPL
83651	2001 TX_{6}	—	October 10, 2001	Palomar	NEAT	·	3.9 km	MPC · JPL
83652	2001 TM_{8}	—	October 9, 2001	Socorro	LINEAR	·	8.9 km	MPC · JPL
83653	2001 TK_{10}	—	October 13, 2001	Socorro	LINEAR	·	3.7 km	MPC · JPL
83654	2001 TV_{10}	—	October 13, 2001	Socorro	LINEAR	·	3.8 km	MPC · JPL
83655	2001 TA_{12}	—	October 13, 2001	Socorro	LINEAR	·	5.3 km	MPC · JPL
83656	2001 TP_{12}	—	October 13, 2001	Socorro	LINEAR	THM	6.9 km	MPC · JPL
83657 Albertosordi	2001 TV_{13}	Albertosordi	October 12, 2001	Colleverde	V. S. Casulli	·	7.3 km	MPC · JPL
83658	2001 TZ_{14}	—	October 10, 2001	Palomar	NEAT	EOS	3.6 km	MPC · JPL
83659	2001 TR_{15}	—	October 11, 2001	Socorro	LINEAR	·	6.2 km	MPC · JPL
83660	2001 TJ_{16}	—	October 11, 2001	Socorro	LINEAR	EOS	3.4 km	MPC · JPL
83661	2001 TL_{17}	—	October 13, 2001	Goodricke-Pigott	R. A. Tucker	URS	9.1 km	MPC · JPL
83662	2001 TB_{18}	—	October 14, 2001	Desert Eagle	W. K. Y. Yeung	·	8.1 km	MPC · JPL
83663	2001 TH_{19}	—	October 9, 2001	Socorro	LINEAR	EUN	4.2 km	MPC · JPL
83664	2001 TR_{19}	—	October 9, 2001	Socorro	LINEAR	·	7.4 km	MPC · JPL
83665	2001 TP_{21}	—	October 11, 2001	Socorro	LINEAR	·	2.7 km	MPC · JPL
83666	2001 TZ_{21}	—	October 11, 2001	Socorro	LINEAR	·	10 km	MPC · JPL
83667	2001 TN_{22}	—	October 13, 2001	Socorro	LINEAR	EUN	2.7 km	MPC · JPL
83668	2001 TB_{27}	—	October 14, 2001	Socorro	LINEAR	EOS	4.0 km	MPC · JPL
83669	2001 TV_{29}	—	October 14, 2001	Socorro	LINEAR	·	4.7 km	MPC · JPL
83670	2001 TL_{30}	—	October 14, 2001	Socorro	LINEAR	EOS	6.5 km	MPC · JPL
83671	2001 TN_{30}	—	October 14, 2001	Socorro	LINEAR	EOS	3.8 km	MPC · JPL
83672	2001 TD_{35}	—	October 14, 2001	Socorro	LINEAR	·	6.7 km	MPC · JPL
83673	2001 TN_{35}	—	October 14, 2001	Socorro	LINEAR	·	7.7 km	MPC · JPL
83674	2001 TP_{41}	—	October 14, 2001	Socorro	LINEAR	ADE	7.3 km	MPC · JPL
83675	2001 TJ_{45}	—	October 14, 2001	Desert Eagle	W. K. Y. Yeung	VER	8.3 km	MPC · JPL
83676	2001 TW_{45}	—	October 9, 2001	Kitt Peak	Spacewatch	(3460)	6.0 km	MPC · JPL
83677	2001 TW_{46}	—	October 15, 2001	Desert Eagle	W. K. Y. Yeung	HYG	5.9 km	MPC · JPL
83678	2001 TC_{47}	—	October 15, 2001	Desert Eagle	W. K. Y. Yeung	·	3.3 km	MPC · JPL
83679	2001 TB_{48}	—	October 14, 2001	Cima Ekar	ADAS	·	2.9 km	MPC · JPL
83680	2001 TO_{49}	—	October 15, 2001	Desert Eagle	W. K. Y. Yeung	·	2.8 km	MPC · JPL
83681	2001 TC_{50}	—	October 13, 2001	Socorro	LINEAR	·	6.9 km	MPC · JPL
83682	2001 TG_{50}	—	October 13, 2001	Socorro	LINEAR	·	8.0 km	MPC · JPL
83683	2001 TV_{51}	—	October 13, 2001	Socorro	LINEAR	EOS	3.6 km	MPC · JPL
83684	2001 TX_{51}	—	October 13, 2001	Socorro	LINEAR	·	6.6 km	MPC · JPL
83685	2001 TW_{52}	—	October 13, 2001	Socorro	LINEAR	AGN	2.7 km	MPC · JPL
83686	2001 TC_{53}	—	October 13, 2001	Socorro	LINEAR	·	3.8 km	MPC · JPL
83687	2001 TQ_{54}	—	October 14, 2001	Socorro	LINEAR	·	6.5 km	MPC · JPL
83688	2001 TO_{55}	—	October 14, 2001	Socorro	LINEAR	NEM	4.6 km	MPC · JPL
83689	2001 TL_{63}	—	October 13, 2001	Socorro	LINEAR	·	5.4 km	MPC · JPL
83690	2001 TW_{63}	—	October 13, 2001	Socorro	LINEAR	MIS	5.0 km	MPC · JPL
83691	2001 TE_{65}	—	October 13, 2001	Socorro	LINEAR	·	6.6 km	MPC · JPL
83692	2001 TX_{65}	—	October 13, 2001	Socorro	LINEAR	·	5.0 km	MPC · JPL
83693	2001 TY_{65}	—	October 13, 2001	Socorro	LINEAR	·	4.7 km	MPC · JPL
83694	2001 TG_{67}	—	October 13, 2001	Socorro	LINEAR	KOR	4.6 km	MPC · JPL
83695	2001 TD_{68}	—	October 13, 2001	Socorro	LINEAR	EOS	4.5 km	MPC · JPL
83696	2001 TD_{70}	—	October 13, 2001	Socorro	LINEAR	·	2.9 km	MPC · JPL
83697	2001 TA_{72}	—	October 13, 2001	Socorro	LINEAR	·	6.6 km	MPC · JPL
83698	2001 TM_{72}	—	October 13, 2001	Socorro	LINEAR	·	6.0 km	MPC · JPL
83699	2001 TZ_{72}	—	October 13, 2001	Socorro	LINEAR	KOR	2.9 km	MPC · JPL
83700	2001 TG_{73}	—	October 13, 2001	Socorro	LINEAR	EOS	5.1 km	MPC · JPL

== 83701–83800 ==
back to top

Designation			Discovery			Properties		Ref
Permanent	Provisional	Named after	Date	Site	Discoverer(s)	Category	Diam.	Ref
83701	2001 TA_{75}	—	October 13, 2001	Socorro	LINEAR	·	6.4 km	MPC · JPL
83702	2001 TJ_{75}	—	October 13, 2001	Socorro	LINEAR	EOS	3.6 km	MPC · JPL
83703	2001 TX_{75}	—	October 13, 2001	Socorro	LINEAR	·	2.1 km	MPC · JPL
83704	2001 TO_{76}	—	October 13, 2001	Socorro	LINEAR	·	5.6 km	MPC · JPL
83705	2001 TL_{77}	—	October 13, 2001	Socorro	LINEAR	EOS	3.8 km	MPC · JPL
83706	2001 TM_{77}	—	October 13, 2001	Socorro	LINEAR	URS	7.2 km	MPC · JPL
83707	2001 TQ_{77}	—	October 13, 2001	Socorro	LINEAR	·	6.8 km	MPC · JPL
83708	2001 TW_{77}	—	October 13, 2001	Socorro	LINEAR	·	4.3 km	MPC · JPL
83709	2001 TW_{80}	—	October 14, 2001	Socorro	LINEAR	·	5.7 km	MPC · JPL
83710	2001 TW_{81}	—	October 14, 2001	Socorro	LINEAR	·	4.0 km	MPC · JPL
83711	2001 TH_{82}	—	October 14, 2001	Socorro	LINEAR	·	7.1 km	MPC · JPL
83712	2001 TS_{82}	—	October 14, 2001	Socorro	LINEAR	·	5.2 km	MPC · JPL
83713	2001 TJ_{84}	—	October 14, 2001	Socorro	LINEAR	KOR	2.8 km	MPC · JPL
83714	2001 TU_{86}	—	October 14, 2001	Socorro	LINEAR	·	2.9 km	MPC · JPL
83715	2001 TV_{86}	—	October 14, 2001	Socorro	LINEAR	·	5.3 km	MPC · JPL
83716	2001 TM_{88}	—	October 14, 2001	Socorro	LINEAR	·	6.6 km	MPC · JPL
83717	2001 TW_{91}	—	October 14, 2001	Socorro	LINEAR	·	5.7 km	MPC · JPL
83718	2001 TB_{94}	—	October 14, 2001	Socorro	LINEAR	·	4.7 km	MPC · JPL
83719	2001 TH_{94}	—	October 14, 2001	Socorro	LINEAR	·	6.6 km	MPC · JPL
83720	2001 TJ_{94}	—	October 14, 2001	Socorro	LINEAR	·	3.5 km	MPC · JPL
83721	2001 TT_{97}	—	October 14, 2001	Socorro	LINEAR	·	5.3 km	MPC · JPL
83722	2001 TL_{98}	—	October 14, 2001	Socorro	LINEAR	3:2 · SHU	10 km	MPC · JPL
83723	2001 TN_{98}	—	October 14, 2001	Socorro	LINEAR	·	6.0 km	MPC · JPL
83724	2001 TA_{101}	—	October 14, 2001	Socorro	LINEAR	EOS	3.7 km	MPC · JPL
83725	2001 TW_{103}	—	October 15, 2001	Desert Eagle	W. K. Y. Yeung	EMA	6.7 km	MPC · JPL
83726	2001 TR_{104}	—	October 13, 2001	Socorro	LINEAR	·	3.6 km	MPC · JPL
83727	2001 TO_{105}	—	October 13, 2001	Socorro	LINEAR	·	5.2 km	MPC · JPL
83728	2001 TH_{110}	—	October 14, 2001	Socorro	LINEAR	EOS	4.6 km	MPC · JPL
83729	2001 TG_{111}	—	October 14, 2001	Socorro	LINEAR	·	6.8 km	MPC · JPL
83730	2001 TP_{116}	—	October 14, 2001	Socorro	LINEAR	·	5.5 km	MPC · JPL
83731	2001 TW_{116}	—	October 14, 2001	Socorro	LINEAR	·	7.8 km	MPC · JPL
83732	2001 TC_{118}	—	October 15, 2001	Socorro	LINEAR	·	7.1 km	MPC · JPL
83733	2001 TK_{118}	—	October 15, 2001	Socorro	LINEAR	·	9.2 km	MPC · JPL
83734	2001 TY_{121}	—	October 15, 2001	Socorro	LINEAR	·	4.6 km	MPC · JPL
83735	2001 TW_{122}	—	October 15, 2001	Socorro	LINEAR	·	6.8 km	MPC · JPL
83736	2001 TS_{124}	—	October 12, 2001	Haleakala	NEAT	EOS	3.8 km	MPC · JPL
83737	2001 TA_{125}	—	October 12, 2001	Haleakala	NEAT	EOS	6.1 km	MPC · JPL
83738	2001 TA_{126}	—	October 12, 2001	Haleakala	NEAT	CYB	7.7 km	MPC · JPL
83739	2001 TO_{128}	—	October 13, 2001	Palomar	NEAT	EOS	4.5 km	MPC · JPL
83740	2001 TQ_{130}	—	October 8, 2001	Palomar	NEAT	EOS	4.9 km	MPC · JPL
83741	2001 TT_{130}	—	October 10, 2001	Palomar	NEAT	·	5.2 km	MPC · JPL
83742	2001 TD_{131}	—	October 10, 2001	Palomar	NEAT	·	7.0 km	MPC · JPL
83743	2001 TZ_{133}	—	October 12, 2001	Haleakala	NEAT	·	6.5 km	MPC · JPL
83744	2001 TN_{134}	—	October 13, 2001	Palomar	NEAT	·	6.2 km	MPC · JPL
83745	2001 TP_{136}	—	October 14, 2001	Palomar	NEAT	·	3.9 km	MPC · JPL
83746	2001 TQ_{136}	—	October 14, 2001	Palomar	NEAT	·	4.6 km	MPC · JPL
83747	2001 TR_{136}	—	October 14, 2001	Palomar	NEAT	EOS	6.8 km	MPC · JPL
83748	2001 TT_{136}	—	October 14, 2001	Palomar	NEAT	·	4.9 km	MPC · JPL
83749	2001 TO_{137}	—	October 14, 2001	Palomar	NEAT	EOS	4.5 km	MPC · JPL
83750	2001 TS_{137}	—	October 14, 2001	Palomar	NEAT	EOS	4.9 km	MPC · JPL
83751	2001 TX_{137}	—	October 14, 2001	Palomar	NEAT	·	5.8 km	MPC · JPL
83752	2001 TY_{137}	—	October 14, 2001	Palomar	NEAT	EOS	4.5 km	MPC · JPL
83753	2001 TX_{138}	—	October 10, 2001	Palomar	NEAT	EOS	3.4 km	MPC · JPL
83754	2001 TJ_{139}	—	October 10, 2001	Palomar	NEAT	·	6.5 km	MPC · JPL
83755	2001 TS_{139}	—	October 10, 2001	Palomar	NEAT	(43176)	4.5 km	MPC · JPL
83756	2001 TJ_{140}	—	October 10, 2001	Palomar	NEAT	GEF	2.6 km	MPC · JPL
83757	2001 TX_{144}	—	October 10, 2001	Palomar	NEAT	EOS	4.8 km	MPC · JPL
83758	2001 TW_{145}	—	October 10, 2001	Palomar	NEAT	·	6.5 km	MPC · JPL
83759	2001 TC_{151}	—	October 10, 2001	Palomar	NEAT	·	2.2 km	MPC · JPL
83760	2001 TC_{152}	—	October 10, 2001	Palomar	NEAT	·	4.6 km	MPC · JPL
83761	2001 TE_{152}	—	October 10, 2001	Palomar	NEAT	·	7.5 km	MPC · JPL
83762	2001 TH_{152}	—	October 10, 2001	Palomar	NEAT	EOS	4.6 km	MPC · JPL
83763	2001 TW_{153}	—	October 13, 2001	Palomar	NEAT	EOS	5.3 km	MPC · JPL
83764	2001 TA_{158}	—	October 10, 2001	Palomar	NEAT	EOS	5.2 km	MPC · JPL
83765	2001 TP_{159}	—	October 12, 2001	Haleakala	NEAT	·	7.1 km	MPC · JPL
83766	2001 TQ_{159}	—	October 12, 2001	Haleakala	NEAT	·	8.2 km	MPC · JPL
83767	2001 TZ_{160}	—	October 11, 2001	Palomar	NEAT	·	3.8 km	MPC · JPL
83768	2001 TR_{161}	—	October 11, 2001	Palomar	NEAT	EOS	3.6 km	MPC · JPL
83769	2001 TU_{161}	—	October 11, 2001	Palomar	NEAT	·	3.9 km	MPC · JPL
83770	2001 TB_{164}	—	October 11, 2001	Palomar	NEAT	·	2.8 km	MPC · JPL
83771	2001 TL_{165}	—	October 15, 2001	Palomar	NEAT	·	6.3 km	MPC · JPL
83772	2001 TW_{170}	—	October 15, 2001	Palomar	NEAT	·	4.6 km	MPC · JPL
83773	2001 TN_{171}	—	October 15, 2001	Palomar	NEAT	(1118)	9.1 km	MPC · JPL
83774	2001 TS_{171}	—	October 15, 2001	Palomar	NEAT	·	5.9 km	MPC · JPL
83775	2001 TB_{172}	—	October 13, 2001	Socorro	LINEAR	·	2.8 km	MPC · JPL
83776	2001 TP_{174}	—	October 15, 2001	Socorro	LINEAR	EOS	4.7 km	MPC · JPL
83777	2001 TE_{179}	—	October 14, 2001	Socorro	LINEAR	·	4.6 km	MPC · JPL
83778	2001 TD_{195}	—	October 15, 2001	Palomar	NEAT	EOS	5.2 km	MPC · JPL
83779	2001 TE_{198}	—	October 11, 2001	Socorro	LINEAR	·	3.0 km	MPC · JPL
83780	2001 TC_{199}	—	October 11, 2001	Socorro	LINEAR	·	5.8 km	MPC · JPL
83781	2001 TD_{199}	—	October 11, 2001	Socorro	LINEAR	·	4.8 km	MPC · JPL
83782	2001 TL_{201}	—	October 11, 2001	Socorro	LINEAR	EOS	4.7 km	MPC · JPL
83783	2001 TU_{201}	—	October 11, 2001	Socorro	LINEAR	EOS	4.7 km	MPC · JPL
83784	2001 TY_{201}	—	October 11, 2001	Socorro	LINEAR	·	6.4 km	MPC · JPL
83785	2001 TU_{202}	—	October 11, 2001	Socorro	LINEAR	·	4.2 km	MPC · JPL
83786	2001 TT_{203}	—	October 11, 2001	Socorro	LINEAR	EOS	5.2 km	MPC · JPL
83787	2001 TU_{203}	—	October 11, 2001	Socorro	LINEAR	·	3.4 km	MPC · JPL
83788	2001 TV_{204}	—	October 11, 2001	Socorro	LINEAR	·	6.8 km	MPC · JPL
83789	2001 TC_{205}	—	October 11, 2001	Socorro	LINEAR	VER	5.9 km	MPC · JPL
83790	2001 TH_{209}	—	October 12, 2001	Haleakala	NEAT	(1101)	8.6 km	MPC · JPL
83791	2001 TR_{210}	—	October 13, 2001	Anderson Mesa	LONEOS	·	3.4 km	MPC · JPL
83792	2001 TS_{210}	—	October 13, 2001	Anderson Mesa	LONEOS	·	7.8 km	MPC · JPL
83793	2001 TF_{211}	—	October 13, 2001	Palomar	NEAT	·	4.5 km	MPC · JPL
83794	2001 TM_{211}	—	October 13, 2001	Palomar	NEAT	EOS	4.0 km	MPC · JPL
83795	2001 TX_{211}	—	October 13, 2001	Socorro	LINEAR	(5)	2.6 km	MPC · JPL
83796	2001 TC_{212}	—	October 13, 2001	Socorro	LINEAR	·	3.7 km	MPC · JPL
83797	2001 TX_{212}	—	October 13, 2001	Palomar	NEAT	·	6.5 km	MPC · JPL
83798	2001 TG_{214}	—	October 13, 2001	Palomar	NEAT	EOS	4.4 km	MPC · JPL
83799	2001 TU_{216}	—	October 13, 2001	Palomar	NEAT	ADE	5.3 km	MPC · JPL
83800	2001 TJ_{217}	—	October 14, 2001	Kitt Peak	Spacewatch	·	8.9 km	MPC · JPL

== 83801–83900 ==
back to top

Designation			Discovery			Properties		Ref
Permanent	Provisional	Named after	Date	Site	Discoverer(s)	Category	Diam.	Ref
83801	2001 TG_{218}	—	October 14, 2001	Anderson Mesa	LONEOS	HIL · 3:2	8.9 km	MPC · JPL
83802	2001 TY_{218}	—	October 14, 2001	Anderson Mesa	LONEOS	VER	7.2 km	MPC · JPL
83803	2001 TD_{219}	—	October 14, 2001	Anderson Mesa	LONEOS	·	5.0 km	MPC · JPL
83804	2001 TA_{222}	—	October 14, 2001	Socorro	LINEAR	HIL · 3:2 · (6124)	12 km	MPC · JPL
83805	2001 TM_{225}	—	October 14, 2001	Anderson Mesa	LONEOS	·	8.2 km	MPC · JPL
83806	2001 TX_{225}	—	October 14, 2001	Anderson Mesa	LONEOS	·	8.8 km	MPC · JPL
83807	2001 TH_{226}	—	October 14, 2001	Palomar	NEAT	·	4.5 km	MPC · JPL
83808	2001 TC_{227}	—	October 15, 2001	Kitt Peak	Spacewatch	·	4.4 km	MPC · JPL
83809	2001 TQ_{227}	—	October 15, 2001	Palomar	NEAT	·	5.8 km	MPC · JPL
83810	2001 TH_{233}	—	October 15, 2001	Palomar	NEAT	EOS	4.0 km	MPC · JPL
83811	2001 TR_{233}	—	October 15, 2001	Palomar	NEAT	·	3.0 km	MPC · JPL
83812	2001 TM_{235}	—	October 15, 2001	Haleakala	NEAT	·	3.4 km	MPC · JPL
83813	2001 TM_{236}	—	October 15, 2001	Palomar	NEAT	EOS	3.9 km	MPC · JPL
83814	2001 TT_{237}	—	October 10, 2001	Palomar	NEAT	·	6.2 km	MPC · JPL
83815	2001 TS_{238}	—	October 15, 2001	Palomar	NEAT	·	4.2 km	MPC · JPL
83816	2001 TD_{239}	—	October 15, 2001	Palomar	NEAT	EUN	2.9 km	MPC · JPL
83817	2001 TM_{239}	—	October 15, 2001	Palomar	NEAT	·	4.0 km	MPC · JPL
83818	2001 TO_{240}	—	October 14, 2001	Socorro	LINEAR	·	5.8 km	MPC · JPL
83819	2001 UY_{2}	—	October 16, 2001	Socorro	LINEAR	·	3.2 km	MPC · JPL
83820	2001 UJ_{4}	—	October 17, 2001	Desert Eagle	W. K. Y. Yeung	·	7.3 km	MPC · JPL
83821	2001 UL_{5}	—	October 18, 2001	Desert Eagle	W. K. Y. Yeung	EOS	4.4 km	MPC · JPL
83822	2001 UN_{7}	—	October 17, 2001	Socorro	LINEAR	·	7.4 km	MPC · JPL
83823	2001 UP_{9}	—	October 17, 2001	Socorro	LINEAR	·	8.7 km	MPC · JPL
83824	2001 UL_{15}	—	October 25, 2001	Desert Eagle	W. K. Y. Yeung	EOS	4.2 km	MPC · JPL
83825	2001 UC_{19}	—	October 16, 2001	Palomar	NEAT	HYG	6.0 km	MPC · JPL
83826	2001 UW_{20}	—	October 16, 2001	Socorro	LINEAR	·	12 km	MPC · JPL
83827	2001 UA_{21}	—	October 17, 2001	Socorro	LINEAR	·	4.5 km	MPC · JPL
83828	2001 UW_{21}	—	October 17, 2001	Socorro	LINEAR	·	5.3 km	MPC · JPL
83829	2001 UZ_{21}	—	October 17, 2001	Socorro	LINEAR	EOS	6.2 km	MPC · JPL
83830	2001 UM_{22}	—	October 17, 2001	Socorro	LINEAR	EOS	6.9 km	MPC · JPL
83831	2001 UE_{23}	—	October 18, 2001	Socorro	LINEAR	·	5.9 km	MPC · JPL
83832	2001 UQ_{23}	—	October 18, 2001	Socorro	LINEAR	·	9.3 km	MPC · JPL
83833	2001 UE_{24}	—	October 18, 2001	Socorro	LINEAR	·	6.5 km	MPC · JPL
83834	2001 UQ_{24}	—	October 18, 2001	Socorro	LINEAR	·	5.7 km	MPC · JPL
83835	2001 UQ_{26}	—	October 18, 2001	Socorro	LINEAR	EOS	5.6 km	MPC · JPL
83836	2001 UD_{30}	—	October 16, 2001	Socorro	LINEAR	EOS	4.2 km	MPC · JPL
83837	2001 UA_{31}	—	October 16, 2001	Socorro	LINEAR	·	4.1 km	MPC · JPL
83838	2001 UL_{31}	—	October 16, 2001	Socorro	LINEAR	·	6.5 km	MPC · JPL
83839	2001 UG_{32}	—	October 16, 2001	Socorro	LINEAR	·	7.1 km	MPC · JPL
83840	2001 UZ_{34}	—	October 16, 2001	Socorro	LINEAR	·	7.4 km	MPC · JPL
83841	2001 UE_{35}	—	October 16, 2001	Socorro	LINEAR	EOS	5.4 km	MPC · JPL
83842	2001 UZ_{35}	—	October 16, 2001	Socorro	LINEAR	·	8.1 km	MPC · JPL
83843	2001 UN_{36}	—	October 16, 2001	Socorro	LINEAR	·	6.9 km	MPC · JPL
83844	2001 US_{36}	—	October 16, 2001	Socorro	LINEAR	·	3.9 km	MPC · JPL
83845	2001 UX_{36}	—	October 16, 2001	Socorro	LINEAR	·	2.3 km	MPC · JPL
83846	2001 UY_{36}	—	October 16, 2001	Socorro	LINEAR	·	3.2 km	MPC · JPL
83847	2001 UO_{37}	—	October 17, 2001	Socorro	LINEAR	·	5.8 km	MPC · JPL
83848	2001 US_{38}	—	October 17, 2001	Socorro	LINEAR	THM	4.9 km	MPC · JPL
83849	2001 UG_{40}	—	October 17, 2001	Socorro	LINEAR	EOS	4.4 km	MPC · JPL
83850	2001 UA_{45}	—	October 17, 2001	Socorro	LINEAR	·	5.7 km	MPC · JPL
83851	2001 UK_{45}	—	October 17, 2001	Socorro	LINEAR	AGN	3.6 km	MPC · JPL
83852	2001 UY_{47}	—	October 17, 2001	Socorro	LINEAR	·	4.2 km	MPC · JPL
83853	2001 UP_{49}	—	October 17, 2001	Socorro	LINEAR	EUN	4.2 km	MPC · JPL
83854	2001 UL_{51}	—	October 17, 2001	Socorro	LINEAR	·	4.4 km	MPC · JPL
83855	2001 UT_{53}	—	October 17, 2001	Socorro	LINEAR	·	4.0 km	MPC · JPL
83856	2001 UF_{55}	—	October 16, 2001	Socorro	LINEAR	·	5.6 km	MPC · JPL
83857	2001 US_{59}	—	October 17, 2001	Socorro	LINEAR	·	4.2 km	MPC · JPL
83858	2001 UD_{65}	—	October 18, 2001	Socorro	LINEAR	HYG	7.4 km	MPC · JPL
83859	2001 UB_{66}	—	October 18, 2001	Socorro	LINEAR	EUN	3.8 km	MPC · JPL
83860	2001 UO_{67}	—	October 20, 2001	Socorro	LINEAR	HYG	6.1 km	MPC · JPL
83861	2001 UR_{67}	—	October 20, 2001	Socorro	LINEAR	·	5.6 km	MPC · JPL
83862	2001 UY_{71}	—	October 16, 2001	Haleakala	NEAT	·	8.5 km	MPC · JPL
83863	2001 UA_{72}	—	October 17, 2001	Haleakala	NEAT	·	4.9 km	MPC · JPL
83864	2001 UT_{72}	—	October 20, 2001	Haleakala	NEAT	NAE	6.9 km	MPC · JPL
83865	2001 UQ_{73}	—	October 17, 2001	Socorro	LINEAR	·	4.2 km	MPC · JPL
83866	2001 UY_{74}	—	October 17, 2001	Socorro	LINEAR	·	5.0 km	MPC · JPL
83867	2001 UC_{77}	—	October 17, 2001	Socorro	LINEAR	HIL · 3:2 · (6124)	11 km	MPC · JPL
83868	2001 UL_{83}	—	October 20, 2001	Socorro	LINEAR	·	8.4 km	MPC · JPL
83869	2001 UA_{89}	—	October 20, 2001	Haleakala	NEAT	·	3.7 km	MPC · JPL
83870	2001 US_{89}	—	October 25, 2001	Socorro	LINEAR	·	11 km	MPC · JPL
83871	2001 UF_{92}	—	October 18, 2001	Palomar	NEAT	·	5.7 km	MPC · JPL
83872	2001 UC_{93}	—	October 19, 2001	Haleakala	NEAT	·	3.2 km	MPC · JPL
83873	2001 UN_{93}	—	October 19, 2001	Haleakala	NEAT	·	4.7 km	MPC · JPL
83874	2001 UZ_{94}	—	October 19, 2001	Haleakala	NEAT	·	7.3 km	MPC · JPL
83875	2001 UA_{95}	—	October 19, 2001	Palomar	NEAT	·	4.4 km	MPC · JPL
83876	2001 UD_{96}	—	October 17, 2001	Socorro	LINEAR	THM	4.5 km	MPC · JPL
83877	2001 UE_{96}	—	October 17, 2001	Socorro	LINEAR	3:2	7.5 km	MPC · JPL
83878	2001 UA_{98}	—	October 17, 2001	Socorro	LINEAR	·	4.5 km	MPC · JPL
83879	2001 UQ_{108}	—	October 20, 2001	Socorro	LINEAR	HYG	6.3 km	MPC · JPL
83880	2001 UT_{109}	—	October 20, 2001	Socorro	LINEAR	·	8.2 km	MPC · JPL
83881	2001 UU_{116}	—	October 22, 2001	Socorro	LINEAR	·	3.1 km	MPC · JPL
83882	2001 US_{120}	—	October 22, 2001	Socorro	LINEAR	·	6.0 km	MPC · JPL
83883	2001 UQ_{123}	—	October 22, 2001	Palomar	NEAT	·	2.7 km	MPC · JPL
83884	2001 UW_{123}	—	October 22, 2001	Palomar	NEAT	EUN	3.1 km	MPC · JPL
83885	2001 UM_{124}	—	October 22, 2001	Palomar	NEAT	·	7.8 km	MPC · JPL
83886	2001 UX_{124}	—	October 22, 2001	Palomar	NEAT	·	5.4 km	MPC · JPL
83887	2001 UL_{126}	—	October 28, 2001	Palomar	NEAT	·	10 km	MPC · JPL
83888	2001 UL_{127}	—	October 17, 2001	Socorro	LINEAR	·	7.7 km	MPC · JPL
83889	2001 UN_{128}	—	October 20, 2001	Socorro	LINEAR	·	3.1 km	MPC · JPL
83890	2001 US_{130}	—	October 20, 2001	Socorro	LINEAR	·	4.7 km	MPC · JPL
83891	2001 UN_{134}	—	October 21, 2001	Socorro	LINEAR	·	3.4 km	MPC · JPL
83892	2001 UN_{135}	—	October 22, 2001	Socorro	LINEAR	EOS	4.2 km	MPC · JPL
83893	2001 UM_{139}	—	October 23, 2001	Socorro	LINEAR	·	7.2 km	MPC · JPL
83894	2001 UY_{141}	—	October 23, 2001	Socorro	LINEAR	·	5.0 km	MPC · JPL
83895	2001 UK_{142}	—	October 23, 2001	Socorro	LINEAR	·	7.5 km	MPC · JPL
83896	2001 UK_{146}	—	October 23, 2001	Socorro	LINEAR	·	6.4 km	MPC · JPL
83897	2001 UJ_{147}	—	October 23, 2001	Socorro	LINEAR	·	3.7 km	MPC · JPL
83898	2001 UZ_{148}	—	October 23, 2001	Socorro	LINEAR	·	2.9 km	MPC · JPL
83899	2001 UF_{152}	—	October 23, 2001	Socorro	LINEAR	·	8.7 km	MPC · JPL
83900	2001 UN_{157}	—	October 23, 2001	Socorro	LINEAR	3:2	7.5 km	MPC · JPL

== 83901–84000 ==
back to top

Designation			Discovery			Properties		Ref
Permanent	Provisional	Named after	Date	Site	Discoverer(s)	Category	Diam.	Ref
83901	2001 US_{163}	—	October 17, 2001	Palomar	NEAT	·	7.9 km	MPC · JPL
83902	2001 UX_{164}	—	October 23, 2001	Palomar	NEAT	·	3.8 km	MPC · JPL
83903	2001 UR_{166}	—	October 24, 2001	Kitt Peak	Spacewatch	3:2	9.2 km	MPC · JPL
83904	2001 UB_{173}	—	October 18, 2001	Palomar	NEAT	·	7.9 km	MPC · JPL
83905	2001 UY_{182}	—	October 16, 2001	Socorro	LINEAR	VER	6.3 km	MPC · JPL
83906	2001 UL_{183}	—	October 16, 2001	Palomar	NEAT	·	4.2 km	MPC · JPL
83907	2001 UD_{184}	—	October 16, 2001	Socorro	LINEAR	EOS	3.8 km	MPC · JPL
83908	2001 UT_{186}	—	October 17, 2001	Socorro	LINEAR	·	6.1 km	MPC · JPL
83909	2001 UB_{189}	—	October 18, 2001	Socorro	LINEAR	·	6.0 km	MPC · JPL
83910	2001 UA_{210}	—	October 20, 2001	Haleakala	NEAT	·	9.1 km	MPC · JPL
83911	2001 UV_{219}	—	October 18, 2001	Socorro	LINEAR	·	9.2 km	MPC · JPL
83912	2001 VH_{1}	—	November 7, 2001	Palomar	NEAT	·	4.8 km	MPC · JPL
83913	2001 VF_{6}	—	November 9, 2001	Socorro	LINEAR	·	6.2 km	MPC · JPL
83914	2001 VA_{7}	—	November 9, 2001	Socorro	LINEAR	THM	5.1 km	MPC · JPL
83915	2001 VF_{7}	—	November 9, 2001	Socorro	LINEAR	EOS	5.3 km	MPC · JPL
83916	2001 VS_{8}	—	November 9, 2001	Socorro	LINEAR	HIL · 3:2 · (6124)	10 km	MPC · JPL
83917	2001 VB_{11}	—	November 10, 2001	Socorro	LINEAR	·	6.7 km	MPC · JPL
83918	2001 VJ_{11}	—	November 10, 2001	Socorro	LINEAR	·	6.0 km	MPC · JPL
83919	2001 VX_{12}	—	November 10, 2001	Socorro	LINEAR	·	7.4 km	MPC · JPL
83920	2001 VX_{15}	—	November 6, 2001	Palomar	NEAT	TIN	5.2 km	MPC · JPL
83921	2001 VB_{16}	—	November 8, 2001	Palomar	NEAT	·	2.9 km	MPC · JPL
83922	2001 VK_{16}	—	November 10, 2001	Palomar	NEAT	·	8.2 km	MPC · JPL
83923	2001 VR_{16}	—	November 10, 2001	Socorro	LINEAR	CYB	15 km	MPC · JPL
83924	2001 VZ_{23}	—	November 9, 2001	Socorro	LINEAR	·	3.8 km	MPC · JPL
83925	2001 VS_{25}	—	November 9, 2001	Socorro	LINEAR	·	6.7 km	MPC · JPL
83926	2001 VS_{37}	—	November 9, 2001	Socorro	LINEAR	DOR	10 km	MPC · JPL
83927	2001 VD_{48}	—	November 9, 2001	Socorro	LINEAR	·	4.6 km	MPC · JPL
83928	2001 VJ_{50}	—	November 10, 2001	Socorro	LINEAR	·	5.5 km	MPC · JPL
83929	2001 VF_{51}	—	November 10, 2001	Socorro	LINEAR	EOS	4.7 km	MPC · JPL
83930	2001 VY_{56}	—	November 10, 2001	Socorro	LINEAR	·	7.6 km	MPC · JPL
83931	2001 VO_{58}	—	November 10, 2001	Socorro	LINEAR	VER	9.0 km	MPC · JPL
83932	2001 VD_{74}	—	November 11, 2001	Socorro	LINEAR	(1118)	6.3 km	MPC · JPL
83933	2001 VJ_{74}	—	November 12, 2001	Socorro	LINEAR	EUN	3.8 km	MPC · JPL
83934	2001 VZ_{74}	—	November 8, 2001	Palomar	NEAT	TEL	3.8 km	MPC · JPL
83935	2001 VV_{86}	—	November 15, 2001	Socorro	LINEAR	·	4.9 km	MPC · JPL
83936	2001 VY_{86}	—	November 15, 2001	Socorro	LINEAR	·	4.0 km	MPC · JPL
83937	2001 VU_{89}	—	November 12, 2001	Socorro	LINEAR	·	4.3 km	MPC · JPL
83938	2001 VO_{93}	—	November 15, 2001	Socorro	LINEAR	·	4.6 km	MPC · JPL
83939	2001 VX_{105}	—	November 12, 2001	Socorro	LINEAR	·	8.1 km	MPC · JPL
83940	2001 VD_{122}	—	November 13, 2001	Haleakala	NEAT	·	8.2 km	MPC · JPL
83941	2001 WD	—	November 16, 2001	Bisei SG Center	BATTeRS	EOS	4.0 km	MPC · JPL
83942	2001 WC_{12}	—	November 17, 2001	Socorro	LINEAR	HYG	5.5 km	MPC · JPL
83943	2001 WK_{14}	—	November 19, 2001	Socorro	LINEAR	T_{j} (2.95) · CYB	6.5 km	MPC · JPL
83944	2001 WM_{17}	—	November 17, 2001	Socorro	LINEAR	·	6.1 km	MPC · JPL
83945	2001 WO_{21}	—	November 18, 2001	Socorro	LINEAR	·	4.4 km	MPC · JPL
83946	2001 WR_{26}	—	November 17, 2001	Socorro	LINEAR	·	4.6 km	MPC · JPL
83947	2001 WT_{36}	—	November 17, 2001	Socorro	LINEAR	EOS	4.4 km	MPC · JPL
83948	2001 WN_{37}	—	November 17, 2001	Socorro	LINEAR	HYG	7.7 km	MPC · JPL
83949	2001 WP_{45}	—	November 19, 2001	Socorro	LINEAR	·	4.6 km	MPC · JPL
83950	2001 WV_{69}	—	November 20, 2001	Socorro	LINEAR	·	6.2 km	MPC · JPL
83951	2001 WG_{74}	—	November 20, 2001	Socorro	LINEAR	·	4.9 km	MPC · JPL
83952	2001 WO_{80}	—	November 20, 2001	Socorro	LINEAR	HYG	5.5 km	MPC · JPL
83953	2001 WA_{97}	—	November 18, 2001	Kitt Peak	Spacewatch	·	4.8 km	MPC · JPL
83954	2001 WU_{98}	—	November 19, 2001	Anderson Mesa	LONEOS	·	3.9 km	MPC · JPL
83955	2001 XR_{6}	—	December 8, 2001	Kitt Peak	Spacewatch	·	2.7 km	MPC · JPL
83956 Panuzzo	2001 XX_{30}	Panuzzo	December 7, 2001	Cima Ekar	ADAS	·	6.5 km	MPC · JPL
83957	2001 XO_{35}	—	December 9, 2001	Socorro	LINEAR	EOS	5.3 km	MPC · JPL
83958	2001 XA_{36}	—	December 9, 2001	Socorro	LINEAR	slow	5.1 km	MPC · JPL
83959	2001 XD_{80}	—	December 11, 2001	Socorro	LINEAR	·	7.7 km	MPC · JPL
83960	2001 XB_{84}	—	December 11, 2001	Socorro	LINEAR	·	7.5 km	MPC · JPL
83961	2001 XQ_{113}	—	December 11, 2001	Socorro	LINEAR	·	4.4 km	MPC · JPL
83962	2001 XW_{123}	—	December 14, 2001	Socorro	LINEAR	·	4.7 km	MPC · JPL
83963	2001 XM_{202}	—	December 11, 2001	Socorro	LINEAR	GEF ·	3.9 km	MPC · JPL
83964	2001 XL_{256}	—	December 7, 2001	Socorro	LINEAR	·	4.0 km	MPC · JPL
83965	2001 XU_{256}	—	December 7, 2001	Socorro	LINEAR	AEG	7.3 km	MPC · JPL
83966	2001 YX_{13}	—	December 17, 2001	Socorro	LINEAR	·	5.5 km	MPC · JPL
83967	2001 YG_{111}	—	December 17, 2001	Anderson Mesa	LONEOS	·	5.7 km	MPC · JPL
83968	2001 YY_{114}	—	December 17, 2001	Socorro	LINEAR	EOS	6.0 km	MPC · JPL
83969	2001 YW_{127}	—	December 17, 2001	Socorro	LINEAR	EOS	4.0 km	MPC · JPL
83970	2001 YQ_{132}	—	December 20, 2001	Socorro	LINEAR	·	3.4 km	MPC · JPL
83971	2002 AU_{25}	—	January 9, 2002	Haleakala	NEAT	·	7.4 km	MPC · JPL
83972	2002 AZ_{34}	—	January 9, 2002	Kingsnake	J. V. McClusky	·	7.0 km	MPC · JPL
83973	2002 AS_{181}	—	January 5, 2002	Palomar	NEAT	·	11 km	MPC · JPL
83974	2002 AV_{181}	—	January 5, 2002	Palomar	NEAT	·	4.0 km	MPC · JPL
83975	2002 AD_{184}	—	January 6, 2002	Kitt Peak	Spacewatch	L4	20 km	MPC · JPL
83976	2002 CA_{15}	—	February 9, 2002	Desert Eagle	W. K. Y. Yeung	·	4.0 km	MPC · JPL
83977	2002 CE_{89}	—	February 7, 2002	Socorro	LINEAR	L4	20 km	MPC · JPL
83978	2002 CC_{202}	—	February 10, 2002	Socorro	LINEAR	L4	18 km	MPC · JPL
83979	2002 EW_{5}	—	March 11, 2002	Palomar	NEAT	L4	20 km	MPC · JPL
83980	2002 EP_{9}	—	March 10, 2002	Palomar	NEAT	L4	16 km	MPC · JPL
83981	2002 EJ_{22}	—	March 10, 2002	Haleakala	NEAT	L4	20 km	MPC · JPL
83982 Crantor	2002 GO_{9}	Crantor	April 12, 2002	Palomar	NEAT	centaur	59 km	MPC · JPL
83983	2002 GE_{39}	—	April 4, 2002	Palomar	NEAT	L4	20 km	MPC · JPL
83984	2002 GL_{77}	—	April 9, 2002	Anderson Mesa	LONEOS	L4	14 km	MPC · JPL
83985	2002 JV_{42}	—	May 8, 2002	Socorro	LINEAR	·	2.6 km	MPC · JPL
83986	2002 JS_{101}	—	May 9, 2002	Socorro	LINEAR	·	2.3 km	MPC · JPL
83987	2002 LR_{32}	—	June 11, 2002	Fountain Hills	C. W. Juels, P. R. Holvorcem	·	8.1 km	MPC · JPL
83988	2002 LC_{34}	—	June 10, 2002	Socorro	LINEAR	·	1.6 km	MPC · JPL
83989	2002 MF_{1}	—	June 17, 2002	Socorro	LINEAR	·	4.6 km	MPC · JPL
83990	2002 MM_{1}	—	June 17, 2002	Socorro	LINEAR	H	1.4 km	MPC · JPL
83991	2002 MS_{1}	—	June 20, 2002	Socorro	LINEAR	·	9.2 km	MPC · JPL
83992	2002 MG_{3}	—	June 25, 2002	Haleakala	NEAT	·	1.9 km	MPC · JPL
83993	2002 MM_{3}	—	June 19, 2002	Socorro	LINEAR	H	1.3 km	MPC · JPL
83994	2002 NJ_{12}	—	July 4, 2002	Palomar	NEAT	·	2.6 km	MPC · JPL
83995	2002 NH_{13}	—	July 4, 2002	Palomar	NEAT	NYS	2.3 km	MPC · JPL
83996	2002 NP_{18}	—	July 9, 2002	Socorro	LINEAR	·	2.4 km	MPC · JPL
83997	2002 NK_{19}	—	July 9, 2002	Socorro	LINEAR	·	2.2 km	MPC · JPL
83998	2002 NA_{24}	—	July 9, 2002	Socorro	LINEAR	V	1.4 km	MPC · JPL
83999	2002 NV_{26}	—	July 9, 2002	Socorro	LINEAR	·	2.7 km	MPC · JPL
84000	2002 NG_{27}	—	July 9, 2002	Socorro	LINEAR	NYS	2.4 km	MPC · JPL

back to top

== See also ==
- Meanings of minor-planet names: 83001–84000
