= List of named minor planets: 80000–89999 =

This is a partial list of named minor planets in numerical order. It contains a total of 185 entries as of 19 October 2026. Minor planets for which no article exist are displayed in grey color and redirect to the list of minor planets (see List of minor planets § Main index).

== From 80,000 to 89,999 ==
- 80008 Danielarhodes
- 80135 Zanzanini
- 80179 Václavknoll
- 80180 Elko
- 80184 Hekigoto
- 80451 Alwoods
- 80652 Albertoangela
- 80675 Kwentus
- 80801 Yiwu
- 80807 Jimloudon
- 80808 Billmason
- 80810 Georgewinters
- 80984 Santomurakami
- 81203 Polynesia
- 81790 Lewislove
- 81822 Jamesearly
- 81859 Joetaylor
- 81915 Hartwick
- 81947 Fripp
- 81948 Eno
- 81971 Turonclavere
- 82071 Debrecen
- 82092 Kalocsa
- 82153 Alemigliorini
- 82232 Heuberger
- 82332 Las Vegas
- 82346 Hakos
- 82361 Benitoloyola
- 82463 Mluigiaborsi
- 82464 Jaroslavboček
- 82559 Emilbřezina
- 82638 Bottariclaudio
- 82656 Puskás
- 82896 Vaubaillon
- 82926 Jacquey
- 82927 Ferrucci
- 82937 Lesicki
- 83360 Catalina
- 83362 Sandukruit
- 83363 Yamwingwah
- 83464 Irishmccalla
- 83598 Aiweiwei
- 83600 Yuchunshun
- 83657 Albertosordi
- 83956 Panuzzo
- 83982 Crantor
- 84011 Jean-Claude
- 84012 Deluise
- 84015 Efthymiopoulos
- 84075 Peterpatricia
- 84095 Davidjohn
- 84096 Reginaldglenice
- 84100 Farnocchia
- 84118 Bracalicioci
- 84119 Sanitariitaliani
- 84120 Antonacci
- 84200 Robertmoore
- 84224 Kyte
- 84225 Verish
- 84339 Francescaballi
- 84340 Jos
- 84342 Rubensdeazevedo
- 84417 Ritabo
- 84447 Jeffkanipe
- 84566 VIMS
- 84882 Table Mountain
- 84884 Dorismcmillan
- 84902 Porrentruy
- 84919 Karinthy
- 84921 Morkoláb
- 84926 Marywalker
- 84928 Oliversacks
- 84943 Timothylinn
- 84945 Solosky
- 84951 Kenwilson
- 84991 Bettyphilpotts
- 84994 Amysimon
- 84995 Zselic
- 84996 Hortobágy
- 85004 Crombie
- 85014 Sutter
- 85015 Gaskell
- 85030 Admetos
- 85047 Krakatau
- 85095 Hekla
- 85119 Hannieschaft
- 85121 Loehde
- 85158 Phyllistrapp
- 85168 Albertacentenary
- 85179 Meistereckhart
- 85183 Marcelaymé
- 85185 Lederman
- 85190 Birgitroth
- 85195 von Helfta
- 85196 Halle
- 85197 Ginkgo
- 85198 Weltenburg
- 85199 Habsburg
- 85200 Johnhault
- 85214 Sommersdorf
- 85215 Hohenzollern
- 85216 Schein
- 85217 Bilzingsleben
- 85267 Taj Mahal
- 85293 Tengzhou
- 85299 Neander
- 85308 Atsushimori
- 85317 Lehár
- 85320 Bertram
- 85368 Elisabettacioni
- 85386 Payton
- 85388 Sakazukiyama
- 85389 Rosenauer
- 85400 Shiratakachu
- 85401 Yamatenclub
- 85410 Ningda
- 85411 Paulflora
- 85422 Maedanaoe
- 85439 Barbero
- 85466 Krastins
- 85471 Maryam
- 85472 Xizezong
- 85485 Lisagermany
- 85495 Franciscabrel
- 85511 Celnik
- 85512 Rieugnie
- 85515 Annakukharskaya
- 85516 Vaclík
- 85558 Tianjinshida
- 85559 Villecroze
- 85564 Emilia
- 85585 Mjolnir
- 85728 Yangfujia
- 85773 Gutbezahl
- 85819 Massimoamato
- 85878 Guzik
- 85970 Fundaçãoterra
- 86029 Riccardopozzobon
- 86043 Cévennes
- 86048 Saint-Tropez
- 86195 Cireglio
- 86196 Specula
- 86279 Brucegary
- 86551 Seth
- 87088 Joannewheeler
- 87097 Lomaki
- 87142 Delsanti
- 87219 Marcbernstein
- 87271 Kokubunji
- 87312 Akirasuzuki
- 87644 Cathomen
- 87933 Bernardschmitt
- 87954 Tomkaye
- 88055 Ghaf
- 88071 Taniguchijiro
- 88146 Castello
- 88260 Insubria
- 88270 Alanhoward
- 88292 Bora-Bora
- 88297 Huikilolani
- 88371 Ilariamazzanti
- 88470 Joaquinescrig
- 88611 Teharonhiawako
- 88705 Potato
- 88786 Thanadelthur
- 88795 Morvan
- 88874 Wongshingsheuk
- 88875 Posky
- 88878 Bowenyueli
- 88879 Sungjaoyiu
- 88906 Moutier
- 88961 Valpertile
- 89131 Phildevries
- 89264 Sewanee
- 89282 Suzieimber
- 89455 Metzendorf
- 89664 Pignata
- 89734 Orsoperuzzi
- 89735 Tommei
- 89739 Rampazzi
- 89818 Jureskvarč
- 89903 Post
- 89909 Linie
- 89956 Leibacher
- 89973 Aranyjános
back to top

== See also ==
- List of minor planet discoverers
- List of observatory codes
- Meanings of minor planet names § Index
