= Teharonhiawako =

Teharonhiawako may be:

- (also Hahgwehdiyu) The good son of the Sky and creator of the Earth (or maize) in Iroquois (specifically Mohawk) mythology
- A Kuiper-belt object, 88611 Teharonhiawako
