= Sawiskera =

Sawiskera may refer to:

- The evil son of the Sky Woman and destroyer of his twin Teharonhiawako's works in Iroquois mythology (specifically Mohawk mythology)
- The moon of a Kuiper Belt object, (88611) Teharonhiawako I Sawiskera
