= List of minor planets: 88001–89000 =

The following is a partial list of minor planets, running from minor-planet number 88001 through 89000, inclusive. The primary data for this and other partial lists is based on JPL's "Small-Body Orbital Elements" and data available from the Minor Planet Center. Critical list information is also provided by the MPC, unless otherwise specified from Lowell Observatory. A detailed description of the table's columns and additional sources are given on the main page including a complete list of every page in this series, and a statistical break-up on the dynamical classification of minor planets.

Also see the summary list of all named bodies in numerical and alphabetical order, and the corresponding naming citations for the number range of this particular list. New namings may only be added to this list after official publication, as the preannouncement of names is condemned by the Working Group for Small Bodies Nomenclature of the International Astronomical Union.

Near-Earth obj.	MBA (inner)	MBA (outer)	Centaur
Mars-crosser	MBA (middle)	Jupiter trojan	Trans-Neptunian obj.
Unclassified

== 88001–88100 ==
Designation			Discovery			Properties		Ref
Permanent	Provisional	Named after	Date	Site	Discoverer(s)	Category	Diam.	Ref
88001	2000 UQ_{37}	—	October 24, 2000	Socorro	LINEAR	KOR	3.2 km	MPC · JPL
88002	2000 UJ_{39}	—	October 24, 2000	Socorro	LINEAR	KOR	2.7 km	MPC · JPL
88003	2000 UV_{39}	—	October 24, 2000	Socorro	LINEAR	THM	7.3 km	MPC · JPL
88004	2000 UQ_{42}	—	October 24, 2000	Socorro	LINEAR	·	3.0 km	MPC · JPL
88005	2000 UR_{44}	—	October 24, 2000	Socorro	LINEAR	·	5.0 km	MPC · JPL
88006	2000 UF_{47}	—	October 24, 2000	Socorro	LINEAR	·	3.2 km	MPC · JPL
88007	2000 UK_{47}	—	October 24, 2000	Socorro	LINEAR	·	5.0 km	MPC · JPL
88008	2000 UE_{48}	—	October 24, 2000	Socorro	LINEAR	KOR	3.0 km	MPC · JPL
88009	2000 UE_{54}	—	October 24, 2000	Socorro	LINEAR	·	8.7 km	MPC · JPL
88010	2000 UJ_{56}	—	October 24, 2000	Socorro	LINEAR	·	2.9 km	MPC · JPL
88011	2000 UT_{56}	—	October 25, 2000	Socorro	LINEAR	·	3.4 km	MPC · JPL
88012	2000 UY_{56}	—	October 25, 2000	Socorro	LINEAR	EUN	2.3 km	MPC · JPL
88013	2000 UZ_{58}	—	October 25, 2000	Socorro	LINEAR	HOF	4.6 km	MPC · JPL
88014	2000 UY_{59}	—	October 25, 2000	Socorro	LINEAR	·	3.0 km	MPC · JPL
88015	2000 UC_{61}	—	October 25, 2000	Socorro	LINEAR	·	4.8 km	MPC · JPL
88016	2000 UG_{61}	—	October 25, 2000	Socorro	LINEAR	·	2.5 km	MPC · JPL
88017	2000 UD_{63}	—	October 25, 2000	Socorro	LINEAR	GEF	7.5 km	MPC · JPL
88018	2000 UJ_{66}	—	October 25, 2000	Socorro	LINEAR	·	3.2 km	MPC · JPL
88019	2000 UT_{66}	—	October 25, 2000	Socorro	LINEAR	·	3.8 km	MPC · JPL
88020	2000 UC_{67}	—	October 25, 2000	Socorro	LINEAR	PAD	2.9 km	MPC · JPL
88021	2000 UZ_{69}	—	October 25, 2000	Socorro	LINEAR	GEF	2.9 km	MPC · JPL
88022	2000 UG_{71}	—	October 25, 2000	Socorro	LINEAR	·	2.8 km	MPC · JPL
88023	2000 UR_{72}	—	October 25, 2000	Socorro	LINEAR	·	4.7 km	MPC · JPL
88024	2000 UU_{75}	—	October 31, 2000	Socorro	LINEAR	slow	4.5 km	MPC · JPL
88025	2000 UT_{79}	—	October 24, 2000	Socorro	LINEAR	·	2.6 km	MPC · JPL
88026	2000 UB_{80}	—	October 24, 2000	Socorro	LINEAR	·	5.8 km	MPC · JPL
88027	2000 UD_{81}	—	October 24, 2000	Socorro	LINEAR	·	4.5 km	MPC · JPL
88028	2000 UD_{83}	—	October 30, 2000	Socorro	LINEAR	CYB	8.3 km	MPC · JPL
88029	2000 UN_{83}	—	October 31, 2000	Socorro	LINEAR	·	3.1 km	MPC · JPL
88030	2000 UN_{86}	—	October 31, 2000	Socorro	LINEAR	·	3.4 km	MPC · JPL
88031	2000 UP_{87}	—	October 31, 2000	Socorro	LINEAR	·	11 km	MPC · JPL
88032	2000 UR_{87}	—	October 31, 2000	Socorro	LINEAR	LUT	8.6 km	MPC · JPL
88033	2000 UL_{91}	—	October 25, 2000	Socorro	LINEAR	MRX	1.8 km	MPC · JPL
88034	2000 UR_{93}	—	October 25, 2000	Socorro	LINEAR	·	3.5 km	MPC · JPL
88035	2000 UA_{95}	—	October 25, 2000	Socorro	LINEAR	·	4.0 km	MPC · JPL
88036	2000 UT_{95}	—	October 25, 2000	Socorro	LINEAR	(16286)	3.9 km	MPC · JPL
88037	2000 UL_{96}	—	October 25, 2000	Socorro	LINEAR	·	3.9 km	MPC · JPL
88038	2000 UB_{97}	—	October 25, 2000	Socorro	LINEAR	HOF	5.5 km	MPC · JPL
88039	2000 UQ_{100}	—	October 25, 2000	Socorro	LINEAR	EOS	6.7 km	MPC · JPL
88040	2000 UU_{100}	—	October 25, 2000	Socorro	LINEAR	·	5.0 km	MPC · JPL
88041	2000 UM_{102}	—	October 25, 2000	Socorro	LINEAR	HYG	6.3 km	MPC · JPL
88042	2000 UT_{103}	—	October 25, 2000	Socorro	LINEAR	·	4.2 km	MPC · JPL
88043	2000 UE_{110}	—	October 29, 2000	Socorro	LINEAR	T_{j} (2.68)	8.9 km	MPC · JPL
88044	2000 UP_{111}	—	October 29, 2000	Socorro	LINEAR	·	6.4 km	MPC · JPL
88045	2000 VC_{5}	—	November 1, 2000	Socorro	LINEAR	KOR	2.6 km	MPC · JPL
88046	2000 VM_{5}	—	November 1, 2000	Socorro	LINEAR	·	7.3 km	MPC · JPL
88047	2000 VR_{7}	—	November 1, 2000	Socorro	LINEAR	·	4.6 km	MPC · JPL
88048	2000 VO_{13}	—	November 1, 2000	Socorro	LINEAR	·	6.9 km	MPC · JPL
88049	2000 VB_{15}	—	November 1, 2000	Socorro	LINEAR	GEF	2.5 km	MPC · JPL
88050	2000 VL_{15}	—	November 1, 2000	Socorro	LINEAR	·	4.3 km	MPC · JPL
88051	2000 VM_{16}	—	November 1, 2000	Socorro	LINEAR	KOR	2.7 km	MPC · JPL
88052	2000 VP_{16}	—	November 1, 2000	Socorro	LINEAR	MRX	1.9 km	MPC · JPL
88053	2000 VE_{18}	—	November 1, 2000	Socorro	LINEAR	AGN	2.4 km	MPC · JPL
88054	2000 VK_{27}	—	November 1, 2000	Socorro	LINEAR	AEO	4.1 km	MPC · JPL
88055 Ghaf	2000 VA_{28}	Ghaf	November 1, 2000	Socorro	LINEAR	·	5.4 km	MPC · JPL
88056	2000 VV_{33}	—	November 1, 2000	Socorro	LINEAR	·	6.1 km	MPC · JPL
88057	2000 VQ_{35}	—	November 1, 2000	Socorro	LINEAR	·	5.1 km	MPC · JPL
88058	2000 VG_{40}	—	November 1, 2000	Socorro	LINEAR	·	3.6 km	MPC · JPL
88059	2000 VT_{40}	—	November 1, 2000	Socorro	LINEAR	·	3.7 km	MPC · JPL
88060	2000 VO_{44}	—	November 2, 2000	Socorro	LINEAR	·	5.7 km	MPC · JPL
88061	2000 VG_{45}	—	November 1, 2000	Socorro	LINEAR	·	3.1 km	MPC · JPL
88062	2000 VX_{45}	—	November 2, 2000	Socorro	LINEAR	MRX	2.5 km	MPC · JPL
88063	2000 VP_{46}	—	November 3, 2000	Socorro	LINEAR	EOS	5.7 km	MPC · JPL
88064	2000 VR_{46}	—	November 3, 2000	Socorro	LINEAR	·	10 km	MPC · JPL
88065	2000 VH_{47}	—	November 3, 2000	Socorro	LINEAR	EOS	4.7 km	MPC · JPL
88066	2000 VX_{47}	—	November 1, 2000	Socorro	LINEAR	·	3.6 km	MPC · JPL
88067	2000 VM_{49}	—	November 2, 2000	Socorro	LINEAR	·	3.5 km	MPC · JPL
88068	2000 VX_{49}	—	November 2, 2000	Socorro	LINEAR	·	7.6 km	MPC · JPL
88069	2000 VY_{50}	—	November 3, 2000	Socorro	LINEAR	·	8.5 km	MPC · JPL
88070	2000 VN_{53}	—	November 3, 2000	Socorro	LINEAR	GEF	3.0 km	MPC · JPL
88071 Taniguchijiro	2000 VO_{59}	Taniguchijiro	November 4, 2000	Saji	Saji	CYB	8.1 km	MPC · JPL
88072	2000 WB	—	November 16, 2000	Kitt Peak	Spacewatch	·	7.3 km	MPC · JPL
88073	2000 WB_{4}	—	November 19, 2000	Socorro	LINEAR	HNS	3.6 km	MPC · JPL
88074	2000 WG_{5}	—	November 19, 2000	Socorro	LINEAR	EOS	4.0 km	MPC · JPL
88075	2000 WL_{8}	—	November 20, 2000	Socorro	LINEAR	(5)	2.4 km	MPC · JPL
88076	2000 WP_{13}	—	November 19, 2000	Socorro	LINEAR	·	5.0 km	MPC · JPL
88077	2000 WG_{14}	—	November 20, 2000	Socorro	LINEAR	AGN	2.6 km	MPC · JPL
88078	2000 WX_{14}	—	November 20, 2000	Socorro	LINEAR	EOS	5.7 km	MPC · JPL
88079	2000 WP_{15}	—	November 21, 2000	Socorro	LINEAR	THM	5.5 km	MPC · JPL
88080	2000 WG_{17}	—	November 21, 2000	Socorro	LINEAR	·	4.9 km	MPC · JPL
88081	2000 WJ_{23}	—	November 20, 2000	Socorro	LINEAR	·	4.7 km	MPC · JPL
88082	2000 WJ_{25}	—	November 21, 2000	Socorro	LINEAR	·	9.7 km	MPC · JPL
88083	2000 WF_{28}	—	November 22, 2000	Haleakala	NEAT	·	6.7 km	MPC · JPL
88084	2000 WT_{32}	—	November 20, 2000	Socorro	LINEAR	·	2.6 km	MPC · JPL
88085	2000 WY_{34}	—	November 20, 2000	Socorro	LINEAR	·	7.1 km	MPC · JPL
88086	2000 WC_{35}	—	November 20, 2000	Socorro	LINEAR	·	6.3 km	MPC · JPL
88087	2000 WW_{41}	—	November 20, 2000	Socorro	LINEAR	·	7.0 km	MPC · JPL
88088	2000 WS_{47}	—	November 21, 2000	Socorro	LINEAR	·	4.7 km	MPC · JPL
88089	2000 WD_{48}	—	November 21, 2000	Socorro	LINEAR	·	6.6 km	MPC · JPL
88090	2000 WE_{48}	—	November 21, 2000	Socorro	LINEAR	(1118)	11 km	MPC · JPL
88091	2000 WG_{48}	—	November 21, 2000	Socorro	LINEAR	·	3.6 km	MPC · JPL
88092	2000 WL_{50}	—	November 26, 2000	Socorro	LINEAR	·	3.2 km	MPC · JPL
88093	2000 WJ_{54}	—	November 20, 2000	Socorro	LINEAR	·	2.9 km	MPC · JPL
88094	2000 WT_{55}	—	November 20, 2000	Socorro	LINEAR	·	15 km	MPC · JPL
88095	2000 WZ_{60}	—	November 21, 2000	Socorro	LINEAR	slow	4.5 km	MPC · JPL
88096	2000 WQ_{62}	—	November 20, 2000	Anderson Mesa	LONEOS	·	3.9 km	MPC · JPL
88097	2000 WU_{62}	—	November 28, 2000	Fountain Hills	C. W. Juels	·	4.1 km	MPC · JPL
88098	2000 WA_{69}	—	November 19, 2000	Socorro	LINEAR	·	6.6 km	MPC · JPL
88099	2000 WJ_{72}	—	November 19, 2000	Socorro	LINEAR	DOR	5.9 km	MPC · JPL
88100	2000 WB_{73}	—	November 20, 2000	Socorro	LINEAR	LIX	7.6 km	MPC · JPL

== 88101–88200 ==
back to top

Designation			Discovery			Properties		Ref
Permanent	Provisional	Named after	Date	Site	Discoverer(s)	Category	Diam.	Ref
88101	2000 WV_{77}	—	November 20, 2000	Socorro	LINEAR	EOS	4.3 km	MPC · JPL
88102	2000 WA_{79}	—	November 20, 2000	Socorro	LINEAR	EOS	5.6 km	MPC · JPL
88103	2000 WJ_{81}	—	November 20, 2000	Socorro	LINEAR	·	3.6 km	MPC · JPL
88104	2000 WT_{81}	—	November 20, 2000	Socorro	LINEAR	EOS	4.2 km	MPC · JPL
88105	2000 WZ_{88}	—	November 21, 2000	Socorro	LINEAR	·	2.9 km	MPC · JPL
88106	2000 WD_{89}	—	November 21, 2000	Socorro	LINEAR	·	6.8 km	MPC · JPL
88107	2000 WJ_{91}	—	November 21, 2000	Socorro	LINEAR	·	3.9 km	MPC · JPL
88108	2000 WO_{96}	—	November 21, 2000	Socorro	LINEAR	·	2.7 km	MPC · JPL
88109	2000 WF_{97}	—	November 21, 2000	Socorro	LINEAR	HYG	6.6 km	MPC · JPL
88110	2000 WK_{98}	—	November 21, 2000	Socorro	LINEAR	·	4.2 km	MPC · JPL
88111	2000 WJ_{101}	—	November 25, 2000	Socorro	LINEAR	·	10 km	MPC · JPL
88112	2000 WF_{103}	—	November 26, 2000	Socorro	LINEAR	·	3.7 km	MPC · JPL
88113	2000 WT_{107}	—	November 20, 2000	Socorro	LINEAR	·	6.6 km	MPC · JPL
88114	2000 WW_{107}	—	November 20, 2000	Socorro	LINEAR	EOS	4.1 km	MPC · JPL
88115	2000 WD_{116}	—	November 20, 2000	Socorro	LINEAR	·	4.1 km	MPC · JPL
88116	2000 WN_{132}	—	November 19, 2000	Socorro	LINEAR	·	5.1 km	MPC · JPL
88117	2000 WV_{132}	—	November 19, 2000	Socorro	LINEAR	·	12 km	MPC · JPL
88118	2000 WQ_{134}	—	November 19, 2000	Socorro	LINEAR	·	9.1 km	MPC · JPL
88119	2000 WX_{134}	—	November 19, 2000	Socorro	LINEAR	·	4.3 km	MPC · JPL
88120	2000 WF_{139}	—	November 21, 2000	Socorro	LINEAR	·	3.9 km	MPC · JPL
88121	2000 WD_{140}	—	November 21, 2000	Socorro	LINEAR	KOR	3.2 km	MPC · JPL
88122	2000 WL_{140}	—	November 21, 2000	Socorro	LINEAR	·	4.0 km	MPC · JPL
88123	2000 WV_{141}	—	November 20, 2000	Anderson Mesa	LONEOS	·	6.8 km	MPC · JPL
88124	2000 WV_{142}	—	November 20, 2000	Anderson Mesa	LONEOS	·	8.0 km	MPC · JPL
88125	2000 WU_{145}	—	November 22, 2000	Haleakala	NEAT	·	11 km	MPC · JPL
88126	2000 WW_{145}	—	November 23, 2000	Haleakala	NEAT	·	7.7 km	MPC · JPL
88127	2000 WY_{146}	—	November 28, 2000	Haleakala	NEAT	EUN	3.2 km	MPC · JPL
88128	2000 WH_{152}	—	November 27, 2000	Socorro	LINEAR	·	5.2 km	MPC · JPL
88129	2000 WN_{152}	—	November 29, 2000	Socorro	LINEAR	CYB	12 km	MPC · JPL
88130	2000 WM_{153}	—	November 29, 2000	Socorro	LINEAR	·	6.4 km	MPC · JPL
88131	2000 WV_{153}	—	November 30, 2000	Socorro	LINEAR	·	8.6 km	MPC · JPL
88132	2000 WF_{155}	—	November 30, 2000	Socorro	LINEAR	EOS	4.1 km	MPC · JPL
88133	2000 WO_{158}	—	November 30, 2000	Kitt Peak	Spacewatch	·	2.6 km	MPC · JPL
88134	2000 WZ_{160}	—	November 20, 2000	Anderson Mesa	LONEOS	·	2.8 km	MPC · JPL
88135	2000 WD_{165}	—	November 22, 2000	Haleakala	NEAT	·	4.8 km	MPC · JPL
88136	2000 WL_{170}	—	November 24, 2000	Anderson Mesa	LONEOS	·	3.7 km	MPC · JPL
88137	2000 WY_{171}	—	November 25, 2000	Socorro	LINEAR	·	4.0 km	MPC · JPL
88138	2000 WD_{172}	—	November 25, 2000	Socorro	LINEAR	·	3.5 km	MPC · JPL
88139	2000 WP_{172}	—	November 25, 2000	Socorro	LINEAR	·	6.5 km	MPC · JPL
88140	2000 WV_{173}	—	November 26, 2000	Socorro	LINEAR	·	11 km	MPC · JPL
88141	2000 WE_{174}	—	November 26, 2000	Socorro	LINEAR	·	8.9 km	MPC · JPL
88142	2000 WH_{175}	—	November 26, 2000	Socorro	LINEAR	·	10 km	MPC · JPL
88143	2000 WN_{177}	—	November 27, 2000	Socorro	LINEAR	·	5.3 km	MPC · JPL
88144	2000 WS_{181}	—	November 25, 2000	Socorro	LINEAR	·	3.2 km	MPC · JPL
88145	2000 WT_{182}	—	November 20, 2000	Anderson Mesa	LONEOS	EUN	2.7 km	MPC · JPL
88146 Castello	2000 WE_{183}	Castello	November 30, 2000	Gnosca	S. Sposetti	KOR	3.0 km	MPC · JPL
88147	2000 WR_{183}	—	November 28, 2000	Socorro	LINEAR	KOR	3.3 km	MPC · JPL
88148	2000 WB_{191}	—	November 19, 2000	Anderson Mesa	LONEOS	·	7.3 km	MPC · JPL
88149	2000 XJ_{3}	—	December 1, 2000	Socorro	LINEAR	·	8.0 km	MPC · JPL
88150	2000 XZ_{3}	—	December 1, 2000	Socorro	LINEAR	·	2.4 km	MPC · JPL
88151	2000 XO_{4}	—	December 1, 2000	Socorro	LINEAR	·	5.0 km	MPC · JPL
88152	2000 XP_{5}	—	December 1, 2000	Socorro	LINEAR	(43176) ·	12 km	MPC · JPL
88153	2000 XD_{6}	—	December 1, 2000	Socorro	LINEAR	EOS	5.4 km	MPC · JPL
88154	2000 XJ_{6}	—	December 1, 2000	Socorro	LINEAR	EOS	4.2 km	MPC · JPL
88155	2000 XN_{8}	—	December 1, 2000	Socorro	LINEAR	EUP	9.2 km	MPC · JPL
88156	2000 XJ_{9}	—	December 1, 2000	Socorro	LINEAR	·	3.0 km	MPC · JPL
88157	2000 XJ_{12}	—	December 4, 2000	Socorro	LINEAR	·	5.4 km	MPC · JPL
88158	2000 XH_{14}	—	December 4, 2000	Haleakala	NEAT	·	9.9 km	MPC · JPL
88159	2000 XA_{17}	—	December 1, 2000	Socorro	LINEAR	·	2.9 km	MPC · JPL
88160	2000 XV_{17}	—	December 4, 2000	Socorro	LINEAR	·	4.2 km	MPC · JPL
88161	2000 XK_{18}	—	December 4, 2000	Socorro	LINEAR	·	10 km	MPC · JPL
88162	2000 XY_{19}	—	December 4, 2000	Socorro	LINEAR	·	3.4 km	MPC · JPL
88163	2000 XS_{22}	—	December 4, 2000	Socorro	LINEAR	(1118)	9.3 km	MPC · JPL
88164	2000 XC_{24}	—	December 4, 2000	Socorro	LINEAR	·	3.2 km	MPC · JPL
88165	2000 XJ_{24}	—	December 4, 2000	Socorro	LINEAR	·	3.6 km	MPC · JPL
88166	2000 XN_{24}	—	December 4, 2000	Socorro	LINEAR	GEF	2.7 km	MPC · JPL
88167	2000 XD_{25}	—	December 4, 2000	Socorro	LINEAR	·	7.4 km	MPC · JPL
88168	2000 XM_{25}	—	December 4, 2000	Socorro	LINEAR	EOS	4.5 km	MPC · JPL
88169	2000 XS_{25}	—	December 4, 2000	Socorro	LINEAR	·	11 km	MPC · JPL
88170	2000 XW_{25}	—	December 4, 2000	Socorro	LINEAR	·	8.8 km	MPC · JPL
88171	2000 XV_{26}	—	December 4, 2000	Socorro	LINEAR	·	3.9 km	MPC · JPL
88172	2000 XD_{28}	—	December 4, 2000	Socorro	LINEAR	·	3.7 km	MPC · JPL
88173	2000 XH_{29}	—	December 4, 2000	Socorro	LINEAR	·	6.6 km	MPC · JPL
88174	2000 XQ_{29}	—	December 4, 2000	Socorro	LINEAR	·	4.4 km	MPC · JPL
88175	2000 XL_{31}	—	December 4, 2000	Socorro	LINEAR	VER	7.7 km	MPC · JPL
88176	2000 XP_{31}	—	December 4, 2000	Socorro	LINEAR	·	4.2 km	MPC · JPL
88177	2000 XW_{31}	—	December 4, 2000	Socorro	LINEAR	·	5.2 km	MPC · JPL
88178	2000 XQ_{32}	—	December 4, 2000	Socorro	LINEAR	·	5.2 km	MPC · JPL
88179	2000 XU_{33}	—	December 4, 2000	Socorro	LINEAR	·	4.8 km	MPC · JPL
88180	2000 XY_{35}	—	December 5, 2000	Socorro	LINEAR	·	5.8 km	MPC · JPL
88181	2000 XT_{36}	—	December 5, 2000	Socorro	LINEAR	EUN	3.0 km	MPC · JPL
88182	2000 XH_{37}	—	December 5, 2000	Socorro	LINEAR	·	4.2 km	MPC · JPL
88183	2000 XX_{40}	—	December 5, 2000	Socorro	LINEAR	·	5.9 km	MPC · JPL
88184	2000 XA_{42}	—	December 5, 2000	Socorro	LINEAR	·	6.1 km	MPC · JPL
88185	2000 XD_{42}	—	December 5, 2000	Socorro	LINEAR	·	5.4 km	MPC · JPL
88186	2000 XF_{42}	—	December 5, 2000	Socorro	LINEAR	·	3.2 km	MPC · JPL
88187	2000 XZ_{42}	—	December 5, 2000	Socorro	LINEAR	(1547)	3.3 km	MPC · JPL
88188	2000 XH_{44}	—	December 5, 2000	Socorro	LINEAR	AMO +1km	1.4 km	MPC · JPL
88189	2000 XJ_{53}	—	December 6, 2000	Socorro	LINEAR	·	9.4 km	MPC · JPL
88190	2000 YH_{18}	—	December 20, 2000	Socorro	LINEAR	·	4.3 km	MPC · JPL
88191	2000 YK_{21}	—	December 30, 2000	Haleakala	NEAT	·	2.1 km	MPC · JPL
88192	2000 YT_{35}	—	December 30, 2000	Socorro	LINEAR	·	5.5 km	MPC · JPL
88193	2000 YJ_{42}	—	December 30, 2000	Socorro	LINEAR	·	4.2 km	MPC · JPL
88194	2000 YE_{45}	—	December 30, 2000	Socorro	LINEAR	·	10 km	MPC · JPL
88195	2000 YV_{45}	—	December 30, 2000	Socorro	LINEAR	·	4.7 km	MPC · JPL
88196	2000 YO_{65}	—	December 16, 2000	Kitt Peak	Spacewatch	·	4.5 km	MPC · JPL
88197	2000 YY_{68}	—	December 28, 2000	Socorro	LINEAR	H	1.2 km	MPC · JPL
88198	2000 YU_{70}	—	December 30, 2000	Socorro	LINEAR	·	5.4 km	MPC · JPL
88199	2000 YQ_{73}	—	December 30, 2000	Socorro	LINEAR	EOS	3.5 km	MPC · JPL
88200	2000 YR_{78}	—	December 30, 2000	Socorro	LINEAR	·	4.8 km	MPC · JPL

== 88201–88300 ==
back to top

Designation			Discovery			Properties		Ref
Permanent	Provisional	Named after	Date	Site	Discoverer(s)	Category	Diam.	Ref
88201	2000 YJ_{92}	—	December 30, 2000	Socorro	LINEAR	·	12 km	MPC · JPL
88202	2000 YS_{98}	—	December 30, 2000	Socorro	LINEAR	HYG	8.0 km	MPC · JPL
88203	2000 YJ_{107}	—	December 30, 2000	Socorro	LINEAR	·	3.5 km	MPC · JPL
88204	2000 YM_{113}	—	December 30, 2000	Socorro	LINEAR	HYG	8.2 km	MPC · JPL
88205	2000 YL_{115}	—	December 30, 2000	Socorro	LINEAR	CYB	8.6 km	MPC · JPL
88206	2000 YE_{118}	—	December 30, 2000	Socorro	LINEAR	H	1.2 km	MPC · JPL
88207	2000 YV_{119}	—	December 18, 2000	Kitt Peak	Spacewatch	·	3.7 km	MPC · JPL
88208	2000 YG_{120}	—	December 19, 2000	Haleakala	NEAT	EUN	2.8 km	MPC · JPL
88209	2000 YQ_{121}	—	December 22, 2000	Anderson Mesa	LONEOS	MAR	2.8 km	MPC · JPL
88210	2000 YQ_{128}	—	December 29, 2000	Haleakala	NEAT	·	4.6 km	MPC · JPL
88211	2000 YH_{130}	—	December 30, 2000	Socorro	LINEAR	EOS	3.9 km	MPC · JPL
88212	2000 YN_{135}	—	December 18, 2000	Anderson Mesa	LONEOS	·	5.4 km	MPC · JPL
88213	2001 AF_{2}	—	January 2, 2001	Socorro	LINEAR	ATE	910 m	MPC · JPL
88214	2001 AB_{21}	—	January 3, 2001	Socorro	LINEAR	·	8.8 km	MPC · JPL
88215	2001 AR_{22}	—	January 3, 2001	Socorro	LINEAR	·	5.1 km	MPC · JPL
88216	2001 AD_{27}	—	January 5, 2001	Socorro	LINEAR	·	2.5 km	MPC · JPL
88217	2001 AY_{28}	—	January 4, 2001	Socorro	LINEAR	·	8.4 km	MPC · JPL
88218	2001 AM_{30}	—	January 4, 2001	Socorro	LINEAR	EOS	4.6 km	MPC · JPL
88219	2001 AM_{31}	—	January 4, 2001	Socorro	LINEAR	·	5.3 km	MPC · JPL
88220	2001 AQ_{39}	—	January 3, 2001	Anderson Mesa	LONEOS	·	4.7 km	MPC · JPL
88221	2001 AP_{42}	—	January 4, 2001	Anderson Mesa	LONEOS	·	3.1 km	MPC · JPL
88222	2001 AY_{51}	—	January 15, 2001	Kvistaberg	Uppsala-DLR Asteroid Survey	DOR	4.9 km	MPC · JPL
88223	2001 BQ_{13}	—	January 21, 2001	Socorro	LINEAR	·	4.3 km	MPC · JPL
88224	2001 BM_{24}	—	January 20, 2001	Socorro	LINEAR	EOS	5.3 km	MPC · JPL
88225	2001 BN_{27}	—	January 20, 2001	Socorro	LINEAR	L4	20 km	MPC · JPL
88226	2001 BY_{41}	—	January 24, 2001	Socorro	LINEAR	H	1.5 km	MPC · JPL
88227	2001 BU_{42}	—	January 19, 2001	Socorro	LINEAR	L4	19 km	MPC · JPL
88228	2001 BW_{42}	—	January 19, 2001	Socorro	LINEAR	·	9.1 km	MPC · JPL
88229	2001 BZ_{54}	—	January 19, 2001	Socorro	LINEAR	L4 · ERY	20 km	MPC · JPL
88230	2001 BT_{65}	—	January 26, 2001	Socorro	LINEAR	HIL · 3:2 · (6124)	19 km	MPC · JPL
88231	2001 BF_{71}	—	January 29, 2001	Socorro	LINEAR	THM	5.5 km	MPC · JPL
88232	2001 BN_{72}	—	January 31, 2001	Socorro	LINEAR	·	7.1 km	MPC · JPL
88233	2001 BJ_{73}	—	January 28, 2001	Haleakala	NEAT	·	16 km	MPC · JPL
88234	2001 CB_{6}	—	February 1, 2001	Socorro	LINEAR	·	5.4 km	MPC · JPL
88235	2001 CW_{6}	—	February 1, 2001	Socorro	LINEAR	·	6.5 km	MPC · JPL
88236	2001 CC_{12}	—	February 1, 2001	Socorro	LINEAR	·	13 km	MPC · JPL
88237	2001 CX_{15}	—	February 1, 2001	Socorro	LINEAR	T_{j} (2.97) · 3:2	11 km	MPC · JPL
88238	2001 CN_{19}	—	February 2, 2001	Socorro	LINEAR	·	8.2 km	MPC · JPL
88239	2001 CU_{19}	—	February 2, 2001	Socorro	LINEAR	EOS	4.7 km	MPC · JPL
88240	2001 CG_{21}	—	February 2, 2001	Farpoint	G. Hug	L4	10 km	MPC · JPL
88241	2001 CD_{23}	—	February 1, 2001	Anderson Mesa	LONEOS	L4	20 km	MPC · JPL
88242	2001 CK_{35}	—	February 2, 2001	Socorro	LINEAR	H · slow	1.6 km	MPC · JPL
88243	2001 CQ_{35}	—	February 5, 2001	Socorro	LINEAR	H	1.3 km	MPC · JPL
88244	2001 CG_{38}	—	February 15, 2001	Višnjan Observatory	K. Korlević	·	4.1 km	MPC · JPL
88245	2001 CH_{49}	—	February 2, 2001	Cima Ekar	ADAS	L4	11 km	MPC · JPL
88246	2001 DZ_{25}	—	February 17, 2001	Socorro	LINEAR	T_{j} (2.97) · 3:2	10 km	MPC · JPL
88247	2001 DF_{27}	—	February 17, 2001	Socorro	LINEAR	THM	9.3 km	MPC · JPL
88248	2001 DR_{101}	—	February 16, 2001	Socorro	LINEAR	·	9.4 km	MPC · JPL
88249	2001 EV_{16}	—	March 3, 2001	Socorro	LINEAR	H	960 m	MPC · JPL
88250	2001 EJ_{17}	—	March 15, 2001	Socorro	LINEAR	H	1.1 km	MPC · JPL
88251	2001 FX_{7}	—	March 20, 2001	Socorro	LINEAR	H	1.6 km	MPC · JPL
88252	2001 FM_{40}	—	March 18, 2001	Socorro	LINEAR	·	11 km	MPC · JPL
88253	2001 FV_{69}	—	March 19, 2001	Socorro	LINEAR	HIL · 3:2 · (6124)	20 km	MPC · JPL
88254	2001 FM_{129}	—	March 31, 2001	Socorro	LINEAR	APO +1km · PHA	800 m	MPC · JPL
88255	2001 FL_{142}	—	March 23, 2001	Anderson Mesa	LONEOS	HYG	6.4 km	MPC · JPL
88256	2001 FY_{168}	—	March 23, 2001	Anderson Mesa	LONEOS	H	1.2 km	MPC · JPL
88257	2001 GU_{2}	—	April 14, 2001	Socorro	LINEAR	H	1.1 km	MPC · JPL
88258	2001 GZ_{2}	—	April 14, 2001	Socorro	LINEAR	H	1.2 km	MPC · JPL
88259	2001 HJ_{7}	—	April 21, 2001	Socorro	LINEAR	H	2.0 km	MPC · JPL
88260 Insubria	2001 HE_{23}	Insubria	April 22, 2001	Schiaparelli	L. Buzzi, Bellini, F.	EUN	2.1 km	MPC · JPL
88261	2001 HR_{29}	—	April 27, 2001	Socorro	LINEAR	·	1.4 km	MPC · JPL
88262	2001 HM_{35}	—	April 29, 2001	Socorro	LINEAR	THM	4.8 km	MPC · JPL
88263	2001 KQ_{1}	—	May 17, 2001	Socorro	LINEAR	AMO +1km	5.7 km	MPC · JPL
88264	2001 KN_{20}	—	May 22, 2001	Socorro	LINEAR	AMO +1km	1.4 km	MPC · JPL
88265	2001 KU_{46}	—	May 22, 2001	Socorro	LINEAR	PHO	2.7 km	MPC · JPL
88266	2001 KF_{48}	—	May 24, 2001	Socorro	LINEAR	·	1.9 km	MPC · JPL
88267	2001 KE_{76}	—	May 22, 2001	Cerro Tololo	M. W. Buie	cubewano (cold)	157 km	MPC · JPL
88268	2001 KK_{76}	—	May 24, 2001	Cerro Tololo	M. W. Buie	cubewano (cold) · critical	187 km	MPC · JPL
88269	2001 KF_{77}	—	May 22, 2001	Cerro Tololo	M. W. Buie	centaur · critical	70 km	MPC · JPL
88270 Alanhoward	2001 KB_{78}	Alanhoward	May 24, 2001	Cerro Tololo	M. W. Buie	·	2.2 km	MPC · JPL
88271	2001 LO_{8}	—	June 15, 2001	Palomar	NEAT	EUN	3.8 km	MPC · JPL
88272	2001 LU_{16}	—	June 14, 2001	Kitt Peak	Spacewatch	·	1.5 km	MPC · JPL
88273	2001 LB_{17}	—	June 15, 2001	Socorro	LINEAR	·	1.6 km	MPC · JPL
88274	2001 LE_{17}	—	June 15, 2001	Socorro	LINEAR	·	4.2 km	MPC · JPL
88275	2001 MA_{6}	—	June 18, 2001	Palomar	NEAT	V	1.4 km	MPC · JPL
88276	2001 MN_{6}	—	June 21, 2001	Palomar	NEAT	(883) · fast	1.8 km	MPC · JPL
88277	2001 MF_{9}	—	June 21, 2001	Palomar	NEAT	V	1.2 km	MPC · JPL
88278	2001 MM_{9}	—	June 21, 2001	Palomar	NEAT	·	2.4 km	MPC · JPL
88279	2001 MX_{12}	—	June 23, 2001	Palomar	NEAT	·	2.8 km	MPC · JPL
88280	2001 MG_{14}	—	June 28, 2001	Anderson Mesa	LONEOS	·	1.6 km	MPC · JPL
88281	2001 MV_{18}	—	June 29, 2001	Anderson Mesa	LONEOS	·	3.1 km	MPC · JPL
88282	2001 MR_{19}	—	June 23, 2001	Palomar	NEAT	NYS	2.7 km	MPC · JPL
88283	2001 MF_{20}	—	June 25, 2001	Palomar	NEAT	·	1.3 km	MPC · JPL
88284	2001 MU_{23}	—	June 27, 2001	Haleakala	NEAT	NYS	2.0 km	MPC · JPL
88285	2001 MX_{23}	—	June 27, 2001	Haleakala	NEAT	·	1.8 km	MPC · JPL
88286	2001 MM_{24}	—	June 30, 2001	Haute Provence	Haute Provence	·	2.0 km	MPC · JPL
88287	2001 MB_{25}	—	June 16, 2001	Anderson Mesa	LONEOS	·	1.3 km	MPC · JPL
88288	2001 MM_{25}	—	June 17, 2001	Palomar	NEAT	NYS	2.6 km	MPC · JPL
88289	2001 MD_{28}	—	June 23, 2001	Palomar	NEAT	·	4.0 km	MPC · JPL
88290	2001 MH_{28}	—	June 24, 2001	Kitt Peak	Spacewatch	·	1.4 km	MPC · JPL
88291	2001 MG_{29}	—	June 27, 2001	Anderson Mesa	LONEOS	·	1.4 km	MPC · JPL
88292 Bora-Bora	2001 NL_{6}	Bora-Bora	July 12, 2001	Punaauia Obs.	Pelle, J. C.	·	1.3 km	MPC · JPL
88293	2001 NZ_{9}	—	July 13, 2001	Palomar	NEAT	·	1.9 km	MPC · JPL
88294	2001 NA_{10}	—	July 13, 2001	Palomar	NEAT	·	1.3 km	MPC · JPL
88295	2001 ND_{12}	—	July 13, 2001	Palomar	NEAT	·	1.5 km	MPC · JPL
88296	2001 NC_{14}	—	July 14, 2001	Palomar	NEAT	·	2.0 km	MPC · JPL
88297 Huikilolani	2001 NP_{14}	Huikilolani	July 11, 2001	Needville	J. Dellinger, Dillon, W. G.	·	1.2 km	MPC · JPL
88298	2001 NN_{20}	—	July 13, 2001	Palomar	NEAT	(194)	4.8 km	MPC · JPL
88299	2001 NS_{21}	—	July 14, 2001	Palomar	NEAT	NYS	3.1 km	MPC · JPL
88300	2001 NW_{21}	—	July 14, 2001	Palomar	NEAT	·	4.3 km	MPC · JPL

== 88301–88400 ==
back to top

Designation			Discovery			Properties		Ref
Permanent	Provisional	Named after	Date	Site	Discoverer(s)	Category	Diam.	Ref
88301	2001 OQ_{2}	—	July 17, 2001	Anderson Mesa	LONEOS	·	2.4 km	MPC · JPL
88302	2001 OO_{3}	—	July 17, 2001	Haleakala	NEAT	·	2.1 km	MPC · JPL
88303	2001 OL_{6}	—	July 17, 2001	Anderson Mesa	LONEOS	·	2.1 km	MPC · JPL
88304	2001 OC_{7}	—	July 17, 2001	Anderson Mesa	LONEOS	NYS ·	4.1 km	MPC · JPL
88305	2001 OF_{8}	—	July 17, 2001	Anderson Mesa	LONEOS	·	3.4 km	MPC · JPL
88306	2001 OG_{8}	—	July 17, 2001	Anderson Mesa	LONEOS	·	1.8 km	MPC · JPL
88307	2001 OS_{11}	—	July 18, 2001	Haleakala	NEAT	·	1.6 km	MPC · JPL
88308	2001 OL_{13}	—	July 20, 2001	Socorro	LINEAR	NYS	2.6 km	MPC · JPL
88309	2001 OP_{17}	—	July 17, 2001	Palomar	NEAT	·	1.6 km	MPC · JPL
88310	2001 OP_{18}	—	July 17, 2001	Haleakala	NEAT	(2076)	2.5 km	MPC · JPL
88311	2001 OA_{19}	—	July 17, 2001	Haleakala	NEAT	·	1.7 km	MPC · JPL
88312	2001 OC_{21}	—	July 21, 2001	Anderson Mesa	LONEOS	·	1.4 km	MPC · JPL
88313	2001 OZ_{21}	—	July 21, 2001	Anderson Mesa	LONEOS	·	1.8 km	MPC · JPL
88314	2001 OL_{30}	—	July 19, 2001	Palomar	NEAT	·	1.4 km	MPC · JPL
88315	2001 OA_{35}	—	July 19, 2001	Palomar	NEAT	·	1.5 km	MPC · JPL
88316	2001 OF_{37}	—	July 20, 2001	Palomar	NEAT	·	1.5 km	MPC · JPL
88317	2001 OJ_{38}	—	July 20, 2001	Palomar	NEAT	V	1.2 km	MPC · JPL
88318	2001 OM_{38}	—	July 20, 2001	Palomar	NEAT	·	3.2 km	MPC · JPL
88319	2001 OX_{41}	—	July 22, 2001	Palomar	NEAT	·	1.7 km	MPC · JPL
88320	2001 ON_{42}	—	July 22, 2001	Palomar	NEAT	·	1.4 km	MPC · JPL
88321	2001 OS_{43}	—	July 23, 2001	Palomar	NEAT	·	1.5 km	MPC · JPL
88322	2001 OZ_{43}	—	July 23, 2001	Palomar	NEAT	·	2.5 km	MPC · JPL
88323	2001 OJ_{45}	—	July 16, 2001	Anderson Mesa	LONEOS	·	3.0 km	MPC · JPL
88324	2001 OP_{46}	—	July 16, 2001	Anderson Mesa	LONEOS	BAP	1.6 km	MPC · JPL
88325	2001 OS_{47}	—	July 16, 2001	Anderson Mesa	LONEOS	·	1.6 km	MPC · JPL
88326	2001 OA_{52}	—	July 21, 2001	Palomar	NEAT	V	1.5 km	MPC · JPL
88327	2001 OH_{54}	—	July 21, 2001	Palomar	NEAT	·	6.0 km	MPC · JPL
88328	2001 OL_{56}	—	July 26, 2001	Palomar	NEAT	V	1.8 km	MPC · JPL
88329	2001 OO_{57}	—	July 19, 2001	Palomar	NEAT	(5)	2.5 km	MPC · JPL
88330	2001 OQ_{57}	—	July 19, 2001	Palomar	NEAT	·	1.6 km	MPC · JPL
88331	2001 OO_{58}	—	July 20, 2001	Socorro	LINEAR	·	2.4 km	MPC · JPL
88332	2001 OO_{60}	—	July 21, 2001	Haleakala	NEAT	·	1.2 km	MPC · JPL
88333	2001 OV_{60}	—	July 21, 2001	Haleakala	NEAT	·	3.3 km	MPC · JPL
88334	2001 OJ_{64}	—	July 24, 2001	Haleakala	NEAT	·	1.9 km	MPC · JPL
88335	2001 OG_{66}	—	July 22, 2001	Palomar	NEAT	·	9.3 km	MPC · JPL
88336	2001 OX_{67}	—	July 16, 2001	Anderson Mesa	LONEOS	·	4.2 km	MPC · JPL
88337	2001 OA_{68}	—	July 16, 2001	Anderson Mesa	LONEOS	NYS	2.4 km	MPC · JPL
88338	2001 OR_{68}	—	July 16, 2001	Haleakala	NEAT	·	2.1 km	MPC · JPL
88339	2001 OB_{70}	—	July 19, 2001	Anderson Mesa	LONEOS	·	2.2 km	MPC · JPL
88340	2001 OE_{70}	—	July 19, 2001	Anderson Mesa	LONEOS	·	1.5 km	MPC · JPL
88341	2001 OG_{70}	—	July 19, 2001	Anderson Mesa	LONEOS	·	2.7 km	MPC · JPL
88342	2001 ON_{70}	—	July 19, 2001	Anderson Mesa	LONEOS	·	2.6 km	MPC · JPL
88343	2001 OW_{70}	—	July 19, 2001	Palomar	NEAT	·	1.8 km	MPC · JPL
88344	2001 OR_{72}	—	July 21, 2001	Anderson Mesa	LONEOS	MAS	1.5 km	MPC · JPL
88345	2001 OV_{72}	—	July 21, 2001	Anderson Mesa	LONEOS	·	2.1 km	MPC · JPL
88346	2001 OA_{73}	—	July 21, 2001	Anderson Mesa	LONEOS	·	2.0 km	MPC · JPL
88347	2001 OR_{73}	—	July 21, 2001	Kitt Peak	Spacewatch	·	1.5 km	MPC · JPL
88348	2001 OT_{75}	—	July 24, 2001	Palomar	NEAT	·	2.0 km	MPC · JPL
88349	2001 OU_{76}	—	July 25, 2001	Haleakala	NEAT	·	5.8 km	MPC · JPL
88350	2001 OJ_{79}	—	July 27, 2001	Palomar	NEAT	·	3.0 km	MPC · JPL
88351	2001 OD_{83}	—	July 27, 2001	Palomar	NEAT	·	1.7 km	MPC · JPL
88352	2001 OJ_{86}	—	July 22, 2001	Socorro	LINEAR	V	1.5 km	MPC · JPL
88353	2001 OC_{89}	—	July 21, 2001	Haleakala	NEAT	NYS	2.2 km	MPC · JPL
88354	2001 OF_{96}	—	July 23, 2001	Palomar	NEAT	·	2.2 km	MPC · JPL
88355	2001 OG_{99}	—	July 27, 2001	Anderson Mesa	LONEOS	·	1.1 km	MPC · JPL
88356	2001 ON_{99}	—	July 27, 2001	Anderson Mesa	LONEOS	V	1.5 km	MPC · JPL
88357	2001 OX_{99}	—	July 27, 2001	Anderson Mesa	LONEOS	·	1.2 km	MPC · JPL
88358	2001 OR_{100}	—	July 27, 2001	Anderson Mesa	LONEOS	·	2.3 km	MPC · JPL
88359	2001 OX_{100}	—	July 27, 2001	Palomar	NEAT	·	3.8 km	MPC · JPL
88360	2001 OM_{103}	—	July 29, 2001	Anderson Mesa	LONEOS	PHO	5.3 km	MPC · JPL
88361	2001 OJ_{104}	—	July 30, 2001	Socorro	LINEAR	·	4.5 km	MPC · JPL
88362	2001 ON_{105}	—	July 29, 2001	Socorro	LINEAR	·	1.7 km	MPC · JPL
88363	2001 OF_{107}	—	July 29, 2001	Socorro	LINEAR	·	3.2 km	MPC · JPL
88364	2001 PK	—	August 5, 2001	Haleakala	NEAT	·	1.5 km	MPC · JPL
88365	2001 PN_{2}	—	August 3, 2001	Haleakala	NEAT	·	2.9 km	MPC · JPL
88366	2001 PG_{6}	—	August 10, 2001	Haleakala	NEAT	·	1.8 km	MPC · JPL
88367	2001 PY_{8}	—	August 11, 2001	Haleakala	NEAT	·	3.5 km	MPC · JPL
88368	2001 PO_{9}	—	August 11, 2001	Ametlla de Mar	J. Nomen	·	2.2 km	MPC · JPL
88369	2001 PU_{11}	—	August 11, 2001	Palomar	NEAT	·	3.1 km	MPC · JPL
88370	2001 PQ_{14}	—	August 15, 2001	Ametlla de Mar	J. Nomen	·	1.6 km	MPC · JPL
88371 Ilariamazzanti	2001 PF_{15}	Ilariamazzanti	August 14, 2001	San Marcello	A. Boattini, M. Tombelli	NYS	2.5 km	MPC · JPL
88372	2001 PT_{17}	—	August 9, 2001	Palomar	NEAT	·	1.3 km	MPC · JPL
88373	2001 PB_{22}	—	August 10, 2001	Haleakala	NEAT	V	1.6 km	MPC · JPL
88374	2001 PN_{22}	—	August 10, 2001	Haleakala	NEAT	·	4.7 km	MPC · JPL
88375	2001 PB_{25}	—	August 11, 2001	Haleakala	NEAT	·	1.8 km	MPC · JPL
88376	2001 PY_{26}	—	August 11, 2001	Haleakala	NEAT	·	2.4 km	MPC · JPL
88377	2001 PK_{29}	—	August 15, 2001	Emerald Lane	L. Ball	·	3.1 km	MPC · JPL
88378	2001 PH_{30}	—	August 10, 2001	Palomar	NEAT	·	1.4 km	MPC · JPL
88379	2001 PF_{34}	—	August 10, 2001	Palomar	NEAT	·	4.7 km	MPC · JPL
88380	2001 PQ_{40}	—	August 11, 2001	Palomar	NEAT	GEF ·	6.8 km	MPC · JPL
88381	2001 PU_{43}	—	August 14, 2001	Haleakala	NEAT	(2076)	1.3 km	MPC · JPL
88382	2001 PL_{49}	—	August 13, 2001	Palomar	NEAT	MAR	3.2 km	MPC · JPL
88383	2001 PO_{58}	—	August 14, 2001	Haleakala	NEAT	·	6.8 km	MPC · JPL
88384	2001 PE_{61}	—	August 13, 2001	Haleakala	NEAT	V	1.1 km	MPC · JPL
88385	2001 PV_{62}	—	August 13, 2001	Haleakala	NEAT	HNS	2.6 km	MPC · JPL
88386	2001 PG_{63}	—	August 13, 2001	Haleakala	NEAT	NYS	2.2 km	MPC · JPL
88387	2001 QT	—	August 16, 2001	Socorro	LINEAR	·	2.0 km	MPC · JPL
88388	2001 QT_{2}	—	August 16, 2001	Prescott	P. G. Comba	·	2.4 km	MPC · JPL
88389	2001 QC_{6}	—	August 16, 2001	Socorro	LINEAR	·	4.0 km	MPC · JPL
88390	2001 QP_{9}	—	August 16, 2001	Socorro	LINEAR	·	3.0 km	MPC · JPL
88391	2001 QU_{10}	—	August 16, 2001	Socorro	LINEAR	·	3.1 km	MPC · JPL
88392	2001 QY_{10}	—	August 16, 2001	Socorro	LINEAR	NYS ·	4.6 km	MPC · JPL
88393	2001 QK_{14}	—	August 16, 2001	Socorro	LINEAR	·	4.5 km	MPC · JPL
88394	2001 QJ_{16}	—	August 16, 2001	Socorro	LINEAR	·	1.8 km	MPC · JPL
88395	2001 QS_{16}	—	August 16, 2001	Socorro	LINEAR	NYS	2.7 km	MPC · JPL
88396	2001 QH_{17}	—	August 16, 2001	Socorro	LINEAR	·	2.2 km	MPC · JPL
88397	2001 QS_{17}	—	August 16, 2001	Socorro	LINEAR	·	1.9 km	MPC · JPL
88398	2001 QK_{21}	—	August 16, 2001	Socorro	LINEAR	·	3.8 km	MPC · JPL
88399	2001 QG_{22}	—	August 16, 2001	Socorro	LINEAR	·	1.9 km	MPC · JPL
88400	2001 QO_{23}	—	August 16, 2001	Socorro	LINEAR	·	2.3 km	MPC · JPL

== 88401–88500 ==
back to top

Designation			Discovery			Properties		Ref
Permanent	Provisional	Named after	Date	Site	Discoverer(s)	Category	Diam.	Ref
88401	2001 QN_{24}	—	August 16, 2001	Socorro	LINEAR	·	1.5 km	MPC · JPL
88402	2001 QW_{24}	—	August 16, 2001	Socorro	LINEAR	DOR	5.2 km	MPC · JPL
88403	2001 QP_{26}	—	August 16, 2001	Socorro	LINEAR	·	1.7 km	MPC · JPL
88404	2001 QR_{26}	—	August 16, 2001	Socorro	LINEAR	NYS	2.4 km	MPC · JPL
88405	2001 QP_{27}	—	August 16, 2001	Socorro	LINEAR	EUN	3.6 km	MPC · JPL
88406	2001 QY_{27}	—	August 16, 2001	Socorro	LINEAR	NYS	2.9 km	MPC · JPL
88407	2001 QB_{28}	—	August 16, 2001	Socorro	LINEAR	·	5.9 km	MPC · JPL
88408	2001 QC_{28}	—	August 16, 2001	Socorro	LINEAR	NYS	2.6 km	MPC · JPL
88409	2001 QH_{28}	—	August 16, 2001	Socorro	LINEAR	·	1.8 km	MPC · JPL
88410	2001 QJ_{28}	—	August 16, 2001	Socorro	LINEAR	·	1.9 km	MPC · JPL
88411	2001 QL_{28}	—	August 16, 2001	Socorro	LINEAR	·	1.4 km	MPC · JPL
88412	2001 QN_{28}	—	August 16, 2001	Socorro	LINEAR	·	2.0 km	MPC · JPL
88413	2001 QF_{31}	—	August 16, 2001	Socorro	LINEAR	·	4.7 km	MPC · JPL
88414	2001 QC_{32}	—	August 17, 2001	Socorro	LINEAR	·	1.5 km	MPC · JPL
88415	2001 QS_{32}	—	August 17, 2001	Palomar	NEAT	·	2.3 km	MPC · JPL
88416	2001 QH_{38}	—	August 16, 2001	Socorro	LINEAR	·	2.4 km	MPC · JPL
88417	2001 QJ_{48}	—	August 16, 2001	Socorro	LINEAR	·	2.7 km	MPC · JPL
88418	2001 QA_{50}	—	August 16, 2001	Socorro	LINEAR	MIS	5.0 km	MPC · JPL
88419	2001 QT_{52}	—	August 16, 2001	Socorro	LINEAR	·	1.8 km	MPC · JPL
88420	2001 QT_{54}	—	August 16, 2001	Socorro	LINEAR	NYS · fast	2.5 km	MPC · JPL
88421	2001 QU_{54}	—	August 16, 2001	Socorro	LINEAR	·	1.5 km	MPC · JPL
88422	2001 QE_{55}	—	August 16, 2001	Socorro	LINEAR	NYS	1.9 km	MPC · JPL
88423	2001 QU_{59}	—	August 18, 2001	Socorro	LINEAR	·	4.4 km	MPC · JPL
88424	2001 QC_{61}	—	August 19, 2001	Socorro	LINEAR	·	1.9 km	MPC · JPL
88425	2001 QH_{61}	—	August 16, 2001	Socorro	LINEAR	V	1.3 km	MPC · JPL
88426	2001 QZ_{61}	—	August 16, 2001	Socorro	LINEAR	·	6.1 km	MPC · JPL
88427	2001 QA_{62}	—	August 16, 2001	Socorro	LINEAR	·	2.7 km	MPC · JPL
88428	2001 QR_{62}	—	August 16, 2001	Socorro	LINEAR	·	1.5 km	MPC · JPL
88429	2001 QM_{64}	—	August 16, 2001	Socorro	LINEAR	·	1.6 km	MPC · JPL
88430	2001 QB_{65}	—	August 16, 2001	Socorro	LINEAR	·	1.8 km	MPC · JPL
88431	2001 QZ_{65}	—	August 17, 2001	Socorro	LINEAR	·	1.8 km	MPC · JPL
88432	2001 QR_{68}	—	August 20, 2001	Oakley	Wolfe, C.	PHO	3.1 km	MPC · JPL
88433	2001 QS_{68}	—	August 20, 2001	Oakley	Wolfe, C.	·	2.9 km	MPC · JPL
88434	2001 QP_{70}	—	August 17, 2001	Socorro	LINEAR	·	1.6 km	MPC · JPL
88435	2001 QW_{70}	—	August 17, 2001	Socorro	LINEAR	·	4.0 km	MPC · JPL
88436	2001 QX_{70}	—	August 17, 2001	Socorro	LINEAR	V	1.9 km	MPC · JPL
88437	2001 QY_{70}	—	August 17, 2001	Socorro	LINEAR	V	1.5 km	MPC · JPL
88438	2001 QA_{71}	—	August 17, 2001	Socorro	LINEAR	·	1.8 km	MPC · JPL
88439	2001 QA_{74}	—	August 16, 2001	Socorro	LINEAR	·	1.7 km	MPC · JPL
88440	2001 QG_{74}	—	August 16, 2001	Socorro	LINEAR	·	4.3 km	MPC · JPL
88441	2001 QA_{75}	—	August 16, 2001	Socorro	LINEAR	MAR	2.9 km	MPC · JPL
88442	2001 QH_{76}	—	August 16, 2001	Socorro	LINEAR	NYS	3.1 km	MPC · JPL
88443	2001 QG_{77}	—	August 16, 2001	Socorro	LINEAR	·	2.2 km	MPC · JPL
88444	2001 QJ_{78}	—	August 16, 2001	Socorro	LINEAR	·	3.2 km	MPC · JPL
88445	2001 QK_{78}	—	August 16, 2001	Socorro	LINEAR	·	2.1 km	MPC · JPL
88446	2001 QR_{80}	—	August 17, 2001	Socorro	LINEAR	EUN	3.7 km	MPC · JPL
88447	2001 QW_{81}	—	August 17, 2001	Socorro	LINEAR	·	1.9 km	MPC · JPL
88448	2001 QH_{82}	—	August 17, 2001	Socorro	LINEAR	·	4.0 km	MPC · JPL
88449	2001 QD_{84}	—	August 17, 2001	Socorro	LINEAR	·	1.9 km	MPC · JPL
88450	2001 QE_{84}	—	August 17, 2001	Socorro	LINEAR	·	1.8 km	MPC · JPL
88451	2001 QW_{86}	—	August 17, 2001	Palomar	NEAT	·	2.9 km	MPC · JPL
88452	2001 QK_{90}	—	August 20, 2001	Palomar	NEAT	·	4.8 km	MPC · JPL
88453	2001 QF_{91}	—	August 23, 2001	Palomar	NEAT	·	2.0 km	MPC · JPL
88454	2001 QG_{92}	—	August 19, 2001	Socorro	LINEAR	·	3.2 km	MPC · JPL
88455	2001 QN_{94}	—	August 23, 2001	Desert Eagle	W. K. Y. Yeung	·	2.6 km	MPC · JPL
88456	2001 QT_{94}	—	August 23, 2001	Desert Eagle	W. K. Y. Yeung	·	5.9 km	MPC · JPL
88457	2001 QV_{94}	—	August 23, 2001	Desert Eagle	W. K. Y. Yeung	·	1.4 km	MPC · JPL
88458	2001 QG_{95}	—	August 22, 2001	Kitt Peak	Spacewatch	·	3.3 km	MPC · JPL
88459	2001 QJ_{95}	—	August 22, 2001	Kitt Peak	Spacewatch	·	2.4 km	MPC · JPL
88460	2001 QT_{97}	—	August 17, 2001	Socorro	LINEAR	·	2.0 km	MPC · JPL
88461	2001 QL_{98}	—	August 19, 2001	Socorro	LINEAR	·	3.8 km	MPC · JPL
88462	2001 QM_{99}	—	August 22, 2001	Socorro	LINEAR	·	4.1 km	MPC · JPL
88463	2001 QK_{101}	—	August 18, 2001	Socorro	LINEAR	·	1.4 km	MPC · JPL
88464	2001 QD_{102}	—	August 18, 2001	Socorro	LINEAR	NYS	2.7 km	MPC · JPL
88465	2001 QZ_{105}	—	August 18, 2001	Anderson Mesa	LONEOS	·	4.1 km	MPC · JPL
88466	2001 QO_{107}	—	August 18, 2001	Anderson Mesa	LONEOS	HNS	2.9 km	MPC · JPL
88467	2001 QM_{108}	—	August 25, 2001	Ametlla de Mar	J. Nomen	·	3.7 km	MPC · JPL
88468	2001 QB_{109}	—	August 19, 2001	Haleakala	NEAT	·	1.9 km	MPC · JPL
88469	2001 QF_{109}	—	August 20, 2001	Palomar	NEAT	H	1.5 km	MPC · JPL
88470 Joaquinescrig	2001 QB_{111}	Joaquinescrig	August 26, 2001	Pla D'Arguines	R. Ferrando	(5)	2.8 km	MPC · JPL
88471	2001 QL_{111}	—	August 26, 2001	Farpoint	Farpoint	·	2.3 km	MPC · JPL
88472	2001 QW_{111}	—	August 22, 2001	Socorro	LINEAR	MAR ·	5.0 km	MPC · JPL
88473	2001 QX_{111}	—	August 23, 2001	Socorro	LINEAR	·	3.5 km	MPC · JPL
88474	2001 QD_{112}	—	August 24, 2001	Socorro	LINEAR	·	2.4 km	MPC · JPL
88475	2001 QO_{113}	—	August 25, 2001	Socorro	LINEAR	·	2.3 km	MPC · JPL
88476	2001 QS_{115}	—	August 17, 2001	Socorro	LINEAR	V	1.3 km	MPC · JPL
88477	2001 QJ_{116}	—	August 17, 2001	Socorro	LINEAR	·	4.2 km	MPC · JPL
88478	2001 QA_{118}	—	August 17, 2001	Socorro	LINEAR	·	2.4 km	MPC · JPL
88479	2001 QQ_{119}	—	August 18, 2001	Socorro	LINEAR	·	1.6 km	MPC · JPL
88480	2001 QL_{120}	—	August 18, 2001	Socorro	LINEAR	V	1.5 km	MPC · JPL
88481	2001 QS_{120}	—	August 19, 2001	Socorro	LINEAR	·	1.4 km	MPC · JPL
88482	2001 QA_{122}	—	August 19, 2001	Socorro	LINEAR	·	2.5 km	MPC · JPL
88483	2001 QQ_{125}	—	August 19, 2001	Socorro	LINEAR	·	1.7 km	MPC · JPL
88484	2001 QV_{126}	—	August 20, 2001	Socorro	LINEAR	·	3.1 km	MPC · JPL
88485	2001 QY_{128}	—	August 20, 2001	Socorro	LINEAR	·	2.5 km	MPC · JPL
88486	2001 QA_{130}	—	August 20, 2001	Socorro	LINEAR	·	1.6 km	MPC · JPL
88487	2001 QN_{130}	—	August 20, 2001	Socorro	LINEAR	·	1.8 km	MPC · JPL
88488	2001 QH_{131}	—	August 20, 2001	Socorro	LINEAR	·	4.2 km	MPC · JPL
88489	2001 QR_{131}	—	August 20, 2001	Socorro	LINEAR	·	2.3 km	MPC · JPL
88490	2001 QH_{132}	—	August 20, 2001	Socorro	LINEAR	·	4.2 km	MPC · JPL
88491	2001 QH_{135}	—	August 22, 2001	Socorro	LINEAR	·	2.7 km	MPC · JPL
88492	2001 QL_{136}	—	August 22, 2001	Socorro	LINEAR	·	7.8 km	MPC · JPL
88493	2001 QG_{137}	—	August 22, 2001	Socorro	LINEAR	·	1.9 km	MPC · JPL
88494	2001 QL_{137}	—	August 22, 2001	Socorro	LINEAR	V	3.1 km	MPC · JPL
88495	2001 QP_{137}	—	August 22, 2001	Socorro	LINEAR	·	2.6 km	MPC · JPL
88496	2001 QT_{137}	—	August 22, 2001	Socorro	LINEAR	·	3.2 km	MPC · JPL
88497	2001 QA_{138}	—	August 22, 2001	Socorro	LINEAR	EOS	5.1 km	MPC · JPL
88498	2001 QO_{138}	—	August 22, 2001	Socorro	LINEAR	·	5.9 km	MPC · JPL
88499	2001 QV_{138}	—	August 22, 2001	Socorro	LINEAR	·	5.4 km	MPC · JPL
88500	2001 QZ_{138}	—	August 22, 2001	Socorro	LINEAR	·	6.1 km	MPC · JPL

== 88501–88600 ==
back to top

Designation			Discovery			Properties		Ref
Permanent	Provisional	Named after	Date	Site	Discoverer(s)	Category	Diam.	Ref
88501	2001 QC_{139}	—	August 22, 2001	Socorro	LINEAR	·	4.7 km	MPC · JPL
88502	2001 QC_{140}	—	August 22, 2001	Socorro	LINEAR	PHO	5.1 km	MPC · JPL
88503	2001 QO_{140}	—	August 22, 2001	Socorro	LINEAR	·	5.4 km	MPC · JPL
88504	2001 QQ_{140}	—	August 22, 2001	Socorro	LINEAR	V	2.1 km	MPC · JPL
88505	2001 QT_{140}	—	August 22, 2001	Socorro	LINEAR	·	2.6 km	MPC · JPL
88506	2001 QW_{140}	—	August 22, 2001	Socorro	LINEAR	·	2.7 km	MPC · JPL
88507	2001 QC_{142}	—	August 24, 2001	Socorro	LINEAR	·	2.1 km	MPC · JPL
88508	2001 QM_{144}	—	August 21, 2001	Kitt Peak	Spacewatch	·	1.8 km	MPC · JPL
88509	2001 QN_{149}	—	August 22, 2001	Haleakala	NEAT	EUN	6.5 km	MPC · JPL
88510	2001 QB_{150}	—	August 25, 2001	Palomar	NEAT	·	3.1 km	MPC · JPL
88511	2001 QK_{154}	—	August 24, 2001	Goodricke-Pigott	R. A. Tucker	·	4.7 km	MPC · JPL
88512	2001 QM_{154}	—	August 25, 2001	Goodricke-Pigott	R. A. Tucker	·	1.8 km	MPC · JPL
88513	2001 QB_{155}	—	August 23, 2001	Anderson Mesa	LONEOS	·	2.8 km	MPC · JPL
88514	2001 QS_{155}	—	August 23, 2001	Anderson Mesa	LONEOS	·	2.6 km	MPC · JPL
88515	2001 QM_{156}	—	August 23, 2001	Anderson Mesa	LONEOS	V	1.3 km	MPC · JPL
88516	2001 QE_{159}	—	August 23, 2001	Anderson Mesa	LONEOS	MAS	1.1 km	MPC · JPL
88517	2001 QO_{159}	—	August 23, 2001	Anderson Mesa	LONEOS	·	2.1 km	MPC · JPL
88518	2001 QG_{160}	—	August 23, 2001	Anderson Mesa	LONEOS	NYS	1.7 km	MPC · JPL
88519	2001 QS_{163}	—	August 31, 2001	Desert Eagle	W. K. Y. Yeung	·	4.4 km	MPC · JPL
88520	2001 QZ_{166}	—	August 24, 2001	Haleakala	NEAT	·	2.7 km	MPC · JPL
88521	2001 QN_{168}	—	August 25, 2001	Palomar	NEAT	·	5.2 km	MPC · JPL
88522	2001 QM_{171}	—	August 25, 2001	Socorro	LINEAR	·	2.5 km	MPC · JPL
88523	2001 QH_{174}	—	August 24, 2001	Socorro	LINEAR	(17392)	2.6 km	MPC · JPL
88524	2001 QS_{174}	—	August 27, 2001	Socorro	LINEAR	V	1.5 km	MPC · JPL
88525	2001 QU_{174}	—	August 25, 2001	Goodricke-Pigott	R. A. Tucker	·	2.8 km	MPC · JPL
88526	2001 QZ_{175}	—	August 23, 2001	Kitt Peak	Spacewatch	·	2.1 km	MPC · JPL
88527	2001 QQ_{177}	—	August 25, 2001	Palomar	NEAT	V	1.4 km	MPC · JPL
88528	2001 QU_{177}	—	August 25, 2001	Palomar	NEAT	·	6.3 km	MPC · JPL
88529	2001 QF_{180}	—	August 25, 2001	Palomar	NEAT	·	2.4 km	MPC · JPL
88530	2001 QK_{180}	—	August 25, 2001	Palomar	NEAT	·	2.0 km	MPC · JPL
88531	2001 QO_{180}	—	August 25, 2001	Palomar	NEAT	V	1.2 km	MPC · JPL
88532	2001 QO_{181}	—	August 31, 2001	Palomar	NEAT	V	2.5 km	MPC · JPL
88533	2001 QB_{183}	—	August 23, 2001	Palomar	NEAT	fast	4.4 km	MPC · JPL
88534	2001 QG_{183}	—	August 22, 2001	Bergisch Gladbach	W. Bickel	·	4.9 km	MPC · JPL
88535	2001 QR_{183}	—	August 28, 2001	Bergisch Gladbach	W. Bickel	(2076)	2.0 km	MPC · JPL
88536	2001 QN_{184}	—	August 21, 2001	Socorro	LINEAR	PHO	3.4 km	MPC · JPL
88537	2001 QF_{185}	—	August 21, 2001	Socorro	LINEAR	·	4.5 km	MPC · JPL
88538	2001 QG_{187}	—	August 21, 2001	Palomar	NEAT	HNS	2.9 km	MPC · JPL
88539	2001 QZ_{188}	—	August 22, 2001	Kitt Peak	Spacewatch	ADE	4.2 km	MPC · JPL
88540	2001 QP_{189}	—	August 22, 2001	Socorro	LINEAR	·	3.1 km	MPC · JPL
88541	2001 QC_{190}	—	August 22, 2001	Socorro	LINEAR	·	4.3 km	MPC · JPL
88542	2001 QY_{190}	—	August 22, 2001	Socorro	LINEAR	·	5.0 km	MPC · JPL
88543	2001 QH_{191}	—	August 22, 2001	Palomar	NEAT	HNS	2.7 km	MPC · JPL
88544	2001 QM_{191}	—	August 22, 2001	Haleakala	NEAT	·	2.8 km	MPC · JPL
88545	2001 QV_{191}	—	August 22, 2001	Socorro	LINEAR	PHO	5.6 km	MPC · JPL
88546	2001 QJ_{192}	—	August 22, 2001	Socorro	LINEAR	·	4.1 km	MPC · JPL
88547	2001 QX_{192}	—	August 22, 2001	Socorro	LINEAR	·	3.5 km	MPC · JPL
88548	2001 QS_{194}	—	August 22, 2001	Socorro	LINEAR	·	2.4 km	MPC · JPL
88549	2001 QG_{197}	—	August 22, 2001	Palomar	NEAT	HNS	2.9 km	MPC · JPL
88550	2001 QT_{197}	—	August 22, 2001	Socorro	LINEAR	·	4.4 km	MPC · JPL
88551	2001 QD_{198}	—	August 22, 2001	Socorro	LINEAR	ERI	3.5 km	MPC · JPL
88552	2001 QG_{198}	—	August 22, 2001	Socorro	LINEAR	·	2.8 km	MPC · JPL
88553	2001 QN_{198}	—	August 22, 2001	Socorro	LINEAR	MAR	3.1 km	MPC · JPL
88554	2001 QW_{199}	—	August 22, 2001	Socorro	LINEAR	·	11 km	MPC · JPL
88555	2001 QG_{200}	—	August 22, 2001	Socorro	LINEAR	·	6.2 km	MPC · JPL
88556	2001 QG_{214}	—	August 23, 2001	Anderson Mesa	LONEOS	·	1.4 km	MPC · JPL
88557	2001 QW_{214}	—	August 23, 2001	Anderson Mesa	LONEOS	·	2.7 km	MPC · JPL
88558	2001 QW_{216}	—	August 23, 2001	Anderson Mesa	LONEOS	·	2.7 km	MPC · JPL
88559	2001 QB_{219}	—	August 23, 2001	Anderson Mesa	LONEOS	·	3.2 km	MPC · JPL
88560	2001 QY_{223}	—	August 24, 2001	Anderson Mesa	LONEOS	·	2.2 km	MPC · JPL
88561	2001 QF_{233}	—	August 24, 2001	Socorro	LINEAR	·	4.4 km	MPC · JPL
88562	2001 QH_{233}	—	August 24, 2001	Socorro	LINEAR	·	1.5 km	MPC · JPL
88563	2001 QT_{233}	—	August 24, 2001	Socorro	LINEAR	MAS	1.2 km	MPC · JPL
88564	2001 QO_{239}	—	August 24, 2001	Socorro	LINEAR	NEM	2.7 km	MPC · JPL
88565	2001 QH_{242}	—	August 24, 2001	Socorro	LINEAR	·	3.9 km	MPC · JPL
88566	2001 QR_{242}	—	August 24, 2001	Socorro	LINEAR	slow	3.1 km	MPC · JPL
88567	2001 QN_{243}	—	August 24, 2001	Socorro	LINEAR	·	2.7 km	MPC · JPL
88568	2001 QG_{244}	—	August 24, 2001	Goodricke-Pigott	R. A. Tucker	·	2.3 km	MPC · JPL
88569	2001 QT_{245}	—	August 24, 2001	Socorro	LINEAR	·	1.8 km	MPC · JPL
88570	2001 QJ_{246}	—	August 24, 2001	Socorro	LINEAR	·	2.1 km	MPC · JPL
88571	2001 QT_{246}	—	August 24, 2001	Socorro	LINEAR	·	1.6 km	MPC · JPL
88572	2001 QZ_{247}	—	August 24, 2001	Socorro	LINEAR	·	1.5 km	MPC · JPL
88573	2001 QF_{248}	—	August 24, 2001	Anderson Mesa	LONEOS	·	5.9 km	MPC · JPL
88574	2001 QM_{248}	—	August 24, 2001	Socorro	LINEAR	·	1.3 km	MPC · JPL
88575	2001 QU_{248}	—	August 24, 2001	Socorro	LINEAR	·	2.0 km	MPC · JPL
88576	2001 QA_{249}	—	August 24, 2001	Socorro	LINEAR	·	1.9 km	MPC · JPL
88577	2001 QV_{249}	—	August 24, 2001	Haleakala	NEAT	·	4.3 km	MPC · JPL
88578	2001 QH_{251}	—	August 25, 2001	Socorro	LINEAR	·	4.0 km	MPC · JPL
88579	2001 QE_{254}	—	August 25, 2001	Socorro	LINEAR	·	2.6 km	MPC · JPL
88580	2001 QP_{258}	—	August 25, 2001	Socorro	LINEAR	V	1.2 km	MPC · JPL
88581	2001 QV_{258}	—	August 25, 2001	Socorro	LINEAR	RAF	2.3 km	MPC · JPL
88582	2001 QN_{259}	—	August 25, 2001	Socorro	LINEAR	·	2.3 km	MPC · JPL
88583	2001 QM_{261}	—	August 25, 2001	Socorro	LINEAR	·	2.0 km	MPC · JPL
88584	2001 QZ_{261}	—	August 25, 2001	Socorro	LINEAR	·	2.4 km	MPC · JPL
88585	2001 QP_{262}	—	August 25, 2001	Palomar	NEAT	·	3.7 km	MPC · JPL
88586	2001 QT_{262}	—	August 25, 2001	Palomar	NEAT	MAR	2.6 km	MPC · JPL
88587	2001 QK_{263}	—	August 25, 2001	Anderson Mesa	LONEOS	·	2.7 km	MPC · JPL
88588	2001 QP_{263}	—	August 25, 2001	Desert Eagle	W. K. Y. Yeung	·	3.9 km	MPC · JPL
88589	2001 QC_{264}	—	August 25, 2001	Anderson Mesa	LONEOS	·	4.2 km	MPC · JPL
88590	2001 QE_{264}	—	August 25, 2001	Anderson Mesa	LONEOS	·	4.2 km	MPC · JPL
88591	2001 QL_{264}	—	August 25, 2001	Anderson Mesa	LONEOS	NYS	2.5 km	MPC · JPL
88592	2001 QL_{267}	—	August 20, 2001	Socorro	LINEAR	·	1.5 km	MPC · JPL
88593	2001 QC_{268}	—	August 20, 2001	Socorro	LINEAR	·	1.5 km	MPC · JPL
88594	2001 QA_{269}	—	August 20, 2001	Palomar	NEAT	EUN	2.8 km	MPC · JPL
88595	2001 QD_{270}	—	August 19, 2001	Socorro	LINEAR	·	1.9 km	MPC · JPL
88596	2001 QN_{270}	—	August 19, 2001	Socorro	LINEAR	PHO	3.6 km	MPC · JPL
88597	2001 QS_{270}	—	August 19, 2001	Socorro	LINEAR	·	2.6 km	MPC · JPL
88598	2001 QM_{271}	—	August 19, 2001	Socorro	LINEAR	·	2.0 km	MPC · JPL
88599	2001 QS_{274}	—	August 19, 2001	Socorro	LINEAR	(2076)	2.4 km	MPC · JPL
88600	2001 QA_{280}	—	August 19, 2001	Socorro	LINEAR	·	3.7 km	MPC · JPL

== 88601–88700 ==
back to top

Designation			Discovery			Properties		Ref
Permanent	Provisional	Named after	Date	Site	Discoverer(s)	Category	Diam.	Ref
88601	2001 QF_{284}	—	August 18, 2001	Palomar	NEAT	(5)	3.2 km	MPC · JPL
88602	2001 QA_{291}	—	August 16, 2001	Socorro	LINEAR	·	5.9 km	MPC · JPL
88603	2001 QL_{291}	—	August 16, 2001	Socorro	LINEAR	GEF	3.5 km	MPC · JPL
88604	2001 QH_{293}	—	August 31, 2001	Palomar	NEAT	EUN	5.8 km	MPC · JPL
88605	2001 QK_{294}	—	August 24, 2001	Anderson Mesa	LONEOS	·	2.2 km	MPC · JPL
88606	2001 QU_{294}	—	August 24, 2001	Socorro	LINEAR	(5)	2.4 km	MPC · JPL
88607	2001 QE_{296}	—	August 24, 2001	Socorro	LINEAR	·	1.5 km	MPC · JPL
88608	2001 QO_{296}	—	August 24, 2001	Socorro	LINEAR	·	1.4 km	MPC · JPL
88609	2001 QP_{296}	—	August 24, 2001	Socorro	LINEAR	·	1.9 km	MPC · JPL
88610	2001 QD_{297}	—	August 24, 2001	Socorro	LINEAR	·	2.3 km	MPC · JPL
88611 Teharonhiawako	2001 QT_{297}	Teharonhiawako	August 20, 2001	Cerro Tololo	Deep Ecliptic Survey	cubewano (cold) · moon	178 km	MPC · JPL
88612	2001 QE_{328}	—	August 25, 2001	Palomar	NEAT	·	3.9 km	MPC · JPL
88613	2001 RO_{1}	—	September 7, 2001	Socorro	LINEAR	·	2.2 km	MPC · JPL
88614	2001 RP_{1}	—	September 7, 2001	Socorro	LINEAR	NYS	2.1 km	MPC · JPL
88615	2001 RG_{3}	—	September 8, 2001	Anderson Mesa	LONEOS	·	1.7 km	MPC · JPL
88616	2001 RC_{4}	—	September 8, 2001	Socorro	LINEAR	EUN	3.5 km	MPC · JPL
88617	2001 RT_{6}	—	September 10, 2001	Desert Eagle	W. K. Y. Yeung	·	3.6 km	MPC · JPL
88618	2001 RH_{7}	—	September 10, 2001	Desert Eagle	W. K. Y. Yeung	(17392)	4.0 km	MPC · JPL
88619	2001 RD_{8}	—	September 8, 2001	Socorro	LINEAR	·	1.7 km	MPC · JPL
88620	2001 RF_{8}	—	September 8, 2001	Socorro	LINEAR	·	1.9 km	MPC · JPL
88621	2001 RR_{10}	—	September 9, 2001	Goodricke-Pigott	R. A. Tucker	·	2.6 km	MPC · JPL
88622	2001 RU_{10}	—	September 10, 2001	Goodricke-Pigott	R. A. Tucker	V	1.4 km	MPC · JPL
88623	2001 RD_{20}	—	September 7, 2001	Socorro	LINEAR	·	6.7 km	MPC · JPL
88624	2001 RR_{21}	—	September 7, 2001	Socorro	LINEAR	·	1.2 km	MPC · JPL
88625	2001 RD_{23}	—	September 7, 2001	Socorro	LINEAR	·	3.5 km	MPC · JPL
88626	2001 RW_{26}	—	September 7, 2001	Socorro	LINEAR	MAS	1.6 km	MPC · JPL
88627	2001 RT_{31}	—	September 8, 2001	Socorro	LINEAR	·	1.5 km	MPC · JPL
88628	2001 RF_{34}	—	September 8, 2001	Socorro	LINEAR	·	2.7 km	MPC · JPL
88629	2001 RQ_{34}	—	September 8, 2001	Socorro	LINEAR	·	2.3 km	MPC · JPL
88630	2001 RU_{34}	—	September 8, 2001	Socorro	LINEAR	·	1.2 km	MPC · JPL
88631	2001 RM_{37}	—	September 8, 2001	Socorro	LINEAR	·	1.3 km	MPC · JPL
88632	2001 RW_{38}	—	September 9, 2001	Socorro	LINEAR	·	2.0 km	MPC · JPL
88633	2001 RP_{43}	—	September 10, 2001	Desert Eagle	W. K. Y. Yeung	·	2.8 km	MPC · JPL
88634	2001 RE_{45}	—	September 12, 2001	Palomar	NEAT	·	2.2 km	MPC · JPL
88635	2001 RH_{45}	—	September 14, 2001	Palomar	NEAT	·	2.9 km	MPC · JPL
88636	2001 RM_{45}	—	September 14, 2001	Palomar	NEAT	(5)	2.5 km	MPC · JPL
88637	2001 RJ_{46}	—	September 12, 2001	Desert Eagle	W. K. Y. Yeung	·	2.2 km	MPC · JPL
88638	2001 RL_{46}	—	September 13, 2001	Prescott	P. G. Comba	·	2.8 km	MPC · JPL
88639	2001 RG_{49}	—	September 11, 2001	Socorro	LINEAR	PHO	2.8 km	MPC · JPL
88640	2001 RU_{49}	—	September 10, 2001	Socorro	LINEAR	EUN	3.4 km	MPC · JPL
88641	2001 RS_{51}	—	September 12, 2001	Socorro	LINEAR	·	4.3 km	MPC · JPL
88642	2001 RV_{51}	—	September 12, 2001	Socorro	LINEAR	EUN	3.3 km	MPC · JPL
88643	2001 RK_{55}	—	September 12, 2001	Socorro	LINEAR	·	3.0 km	MPC · JPL
88644	2001 RA_{65}	—	September 10, 2001	Socorro	LINEAR	·	2.9 km	MPC · JPL
88645	2001 RD_{65}	—	September 10, 2001	Socorro	LINEAR	·	1.6 km	MPC · JPL
88646	2001 RO_{65}	—	September 10, 2001	Socorro	LINEAR	·	2.7 km	MPC · JPL
88647	2001 RX_{66}	—	September 10, 2001	Socorro	LINEAR	·	5.9 km	MPC · JPL
88648	2001 RZ_{66}	—	September 10, 2001	Socorro	LINEAR	·	5.2 km	MPC · JPL
88649	2001 RO_{67}	—	September 10, 2001	Socorro	LINEAR	·	2.5 km	MPC · JPL
88650	2001 RY_{67}	—	September 10, 2001	Socorro	LINEAR	·	3.6 km	MPC · JPL
88651	2001 RZ_{68}	—	September 10, 2001	Socorro	LINEAR	·	2.5 km	MPC · JPL
88652	2001 RF_{69}	—	September 10, 2001	Socorro	LINEAR	EUN	2.6 km	MPC · JPL
88653	2001 RH_{69}	—	September 10, 2001	Socorro	LINEAR	PAD	6.2 km	MPC · JPL
88654	2001 RQ_{69}	—	September 10, 2001	Socorro	LINEAR	·	1.9 km	MPC · JPL
88655	2001 RY_{69}	—	September 10, 2001	Socorro	LINEAR	·	5.1 km	MPC · JPL
88656	2001 RM_{71}	—	September 10, 2001	Socorro	LINEAR	·	4.1 km	MPC · JPL
88657	2001 RT_{71}	—	September 10, 2001	Socorro	LINEAR	·	1.7 km	MPC · JPL
88658	2001 RK_{74}	—	September 10, 2001	Socorro	LINEAR	·	2.4 km	MPC · JPL
88659	2001 RY_{74}	—	September 10, 2001	Socorro	LINEAR	·	1.7 km	MPC · JPL
88660	2001 RN_{75}	—	September 10, 2001	Socorro	LINEAR	·	1.6 km	MPC · JPL
88661	2001 RJ_{76}	—	September 10, 2001	Socorro	LINEAR	V	1.5 km	MPC · JPL
88662	2001 RN_{76}	—	September 10, 2001	Socorro	LINEAR	·	3.3 km	MPC · JPL
88663	2001 RJ_{77}	—	September 10, 2001	Socorro	LINEAR	·	1.9 km	MPC · JPL
88664	2001 RK_{77}	—	September 10, 2001	Socorro	LINEAR	NYS	2.2 km	MPC · JPL
88665	2001 RT_{78}	—	September 10, 2001	Socorro	LINEAR	·	1.8 km	MPC · JPL
88666	2001 RP_{79}	—	September 10, 2001	Socorro	LINEAR	·	1.6 km	MPC · JPL
88667	2001 RR_{79}	—	September 10, 2001	Socorro	LINEAR	·	3.0 km	MPC · JPL
88668	2001 RM_{81}	—	September 14, 2001	Palomar	NEAT	·	3.8 km	MPC · JPL
88669	2001 RC_{84}	—	September 11, 2001	Anderson Mesa	LONEOS	WIT	1.9 km	MPC · JPL
88670	2001 RL_{84}	—	September 11, 2001	Anderson Mesa	LONEOS	·	2.5 km	MPC · JPL
88671	2001 RV_{84}	—	September 11, 2001	Anderson Mesa	LONEOS	·	3.1 km	MPC · JPL
88672	2001 RO_{85}	—	September 11, 2001	Anderson Mesa	LONEOS	·	1.1 km	MPC · JPL
88673	2001 RP_{87}	—	September 11, 2001	Anderson Mesa	LONEOS	·	3.9 km	MPC · JPL
88674	2001 RW_{87}	—	September 11, 2001	Anderson Mesa	LONEOS	·	1.2 km	MPC · JPL
88675	2001 RR_{88}	—	September 11, 2001	Anderson Mesa	LONEOS	·	3.0 km	MPC · JPL
88676	2001 RD_{89}	—	September 11, 2001	Anderson Mesa	LONEOS	·	4.0 km	MPC · JPL
88677	2001 RG_{90}	—	September 11, 2001	Anderson Mesa	LONEOS	·	3.8 km	MPC · JPL
88678	2001 RC_{91}	—	September 11, 2001	Anderson Mesa	LONEOS	·	3.6 km	MPC · JPL
88679	2001 RD_{92}	—	September 11, 2001	Anderson Mesa	LONEOS	·	2.1 km	MPC · JPL
88680	2001 RH_{93}	—	September 11, 2001	Anderson Mesa	LONEOS	·	5.3 km	MPC · JPL
88681	2001 RW_{93}	—	September 11, 2001	Anderson Mesa	LONEOS	NEM	2.5 km	MPC · JPL
88682	2001 RA_{97}	—	September 12, 2001	Kitt Peak	Spacewatch	·	2.4 km	MPC · JPL
88683	2001 RF_{102}	—	September 12, 2001	Socorro	LINEAR	·	2.2 km	MPC · JPL
88684	2001 RC_{104}	—	September 12, 2001	Socorro	LINEAR	·	2.6 km	MPC · JPL
88685	2001 RB_{108}	—	September 12, 2001	Socorro	LINEAR	·	4.6 km	MPC · JPL
88686	2001 RQ_{115}	—	September 12, 2001	Socorro	LINEAR	·	1.9 km	MPC · JPL
88687	2001 RO_{121}	—	September 12, 2001	Socorro	LINEAR	·	2.4 km	MPC · JPL
88688	2001 RK_{122}	—	September 12, 2001	Socorro	LINEAR	·	4.8 km	MPC · JPL
88689	2001 RO_{126}	—	September 12, 2001	Socorro	LINEAR	·	2.1 km	MPC · JPL
88690	2001 RL_{127}	—	September 12, 2001	Socorro	LINEAR	·	2.3 km	MPC · JPL
88691	2001 RK_{129}	—	September 12, 2001	Socorro	LINEAR	·	1.3 km	MPC · JPL
88692	2001 RU_{132}	—	September 12, 2001	Socorro	LINEAR	·	2.5 km	MPC · JPL
88693	2001 RM_{133}	—	September 12, 2001	Socorro	LINEAR	NYS	2.1 km	MPC · JPL
88694	2001 RH_{139}	—	September 12, 2001	Socorro	LINEAR	·	2.2 km	MPC · JPL
88695	2001 RO_{139}	—	September 12, 2001	Socorro	LINEAR	·	4.6 km	MPC · JPL
88696	2001 RS_{139}	—	September 12, 2001	Socorro	LINEAR	·	3.4 km	MPC · JPL
88697	2001 RF_{141}	—	September 12, 2001	Socorro	LINEAR	·	1.9 km	MPC · JPL
88698	2001 RQ_{142}	—	September 11, 2001	Palomar	NEAT	(2076)	1.8 km	MPC · JPL
88699	2001 RW_{142}	—	September 14, 2001	Palomar	NEAT	BAP	2.6 km	MPC · JPL
88700	2001 RF_{143}	—	September 15, 2001	Palomar	NEAT	GEF ·	5.9 km	MPC · JPL

== 88701–88800 ==
back to top

Designation			Discovery			Properties		Ref
Permanent	Provisional	Named after	Date	Site	Discoverer(s)	Category	Diam.	Ref
88701	2001 RW_{150}	—	September 11, 2001	Anderson Mesa	LONEOS	·	2.7 km	MPC · JPL
88702	2001 RC_{151}	—	September 11, 2001	Anderson Mesa	LONEOS	·	2.0 km	MPC · JPL
88703	2001 RF_{155}	—	September 12, 2001	Socorro	LINEAR	·	4.6 km	MPC · JPL
88704	2001 SF	—	September 16, 2001	Fountain Hills	C. W. Juels, P. R. Holvorcem	NYS	2.5 km	MPC · JPL
88705 Potato	2001 SV	Potato	September 17, 2001	Desert Eagle	W. K. Y. Yeung	·	4.8 km	MPC · JPL
88706	2001 SW	—	September 17, 2001	Desert Eagle	W. K. Y. Yeung	·	3.6 km	MPC · JPL
88707	2001 SB_{1}	—	September 17, 2001	Desert Eagle	W. K. Y. Yeung	·	1.9 km	MPC · JPL
88708	2001 SM_{1}	—	September 17, 2001	Desert Eagle	W. K. Y. Yeung	·	1.1 km	MPC · JPL
88709	2001 SA_{3}	—	September 17, 2001	Desert Eagle	W. K. Y. Yeung	·	3.4 km	MPC · JPL
88710	2001 SL_{9}	—	September 18, 2001	Palomar	NEAT	APO +1km · moon	760 m	MPC · JPL
88711	2001 SQ_{9}	—	September 18, 2001	Desert Eagle	W. K. Y. Yeung	KOR	3.1 km	MPC · JPL
88712	2001 SA_{11}	—	September 16, 2001	Socorro	LINEAR	ADE	4.4 km	MPC · JPL
88713	2001 ST_{18}	—	September 16, 2001	Socorro	LINEAR	NYS	1.7 km	MPC · JPL
88714	2001 SA_{21}	—	September 16, 2001	Socorro	LINEAR	GEF	3.9 km	MPC · JPL
88715	2001 SO_{21}	—	September 16, 2001	Socorro	LINEAR	·	2.1 km	MPC · JPL
88716	2001 SG_{22}	—	September 16, 2001	Socorro	LINEAR	(5)	2.1 km	MPC · JPL
88717	2001 SL_{22}	—	September 16, 2001	Socorro	LINEAR	·	1.6 km	MPC · JPL
88718	2001 SG_{23}	—	September 16, 2001	Socorro	LINEAR	·	3.3 km	MPC · JPL
88719	2001 SL_{25}	—	September 16, 2001	Socorro	LINEAR	·	4.9 km	MPC · JPL
88720	2001 ST_{26}	—	September 16, 2001	Socorro	LINEAR	·	3.1 km	MPC · JPL
88721	2001 SD_{27}	—	September 16, 2001	Socorro	LINEAR	·	6.2 km	MPC · JPL
88722	2001 SJ_{27}	—	September 16, 2001	Socorro	LINEAR	·	1.7 km	MPC · JPL
88723	2001 ST_{27}	—	September 16, 2001	Socorro	LINEAR	·	4.7 km	MPC · JPL
88724	2001 SJ_{28}	—	September 16, 2001	Socorro	LINEAR	·	2.1 km	MPC · JPL
88725	2001 SE_{29}	—	September 16, 2001	Socorro	LINEAR	·	4.1 km	MPC · JPL
88726	2001 SS_{31}	—	September 16, 2001	Socorro	LINEAR	·	1.7 km	MPC · JPL
88727	2001 SX_{32}	—	September 16, 2001	Socorro	LINEAR	·	4.9 km	MPC · JPL
88728	2001 SG_{33}	—	September 16, 2001	Socorro	LINEAR	NYS	1.7 km	MPC · JPL
88729	2001 SW_{33}	—	September 16, 2001	Socorro	LINEAR	·	2.9 km	MPC · JPL
88730	2001 SB_{35}	—	September 16, 2001	Socorro	LINEAR	·	2.6 km	MPC · JPL
88731	2001 SJ_{36}	—	September 16, 2001	Socorro	LINEAR	·	9.4 km	MPC · JPL
88732	2001 SR_{36}	—	September 16, 2001	Socorro	LINEAR	·	1.8 km	MPC · JPL
88733	2001 SH_{37}	—	September 16, 2001	Socorro	LINEAR	·	3.5 km	MPC · JPL
88734	2001 SP_{42}	—	September 16, 2001	Socorro	LINEAR	·	2.8 km	MPC · JPL
88735	2001 SV_{42}	—	September 16, 2001	Socorro	LINEAR	NYS	1.7 km	MPC · JPL
88736	2001 SK_{43}	—	September 16, 2001	Socorro	LINEAR	EUN	3.0 km	MPC · JPL
88737	2001 SX_{43}	—	September 16, 2001	Socorro	LINEAR	·	1.4 km	MPC · JPL
88738	2001 SF_{44}	—	September 16, 2001	Socorro	LINEAR	NYS	2.6 km	MPC · JPL
88739	2001 SR_{44}	—	September 16, 2001	Socorro	LINEAR	·	1.5 km	MPC · JPL
88740	2001 SY_{44}	—	September 16, 2001	Socorro	LINEAR	MAS	1.5 km	MPC · JPL
88741	2001 SS_{45}	—	September 16, 2001	Socorro	LINEAR	·	2.0 km	MPC · JPL
88742	2001 SU_{48}	—	September 16, 2001	Socorro	LINEAR	·	2.4 km	MPC · JPL
88743	2001 SD_{49}	—	September 16, 2001	Socorro	LINEAR	·	4.6 km	MPC · JPL
88744	2001 SJ_{49}	—	September 16, 2001	Socorro	LINEAR	·	2.7 km	MPC · JPL
88745	2001 SP_{50}	—	September 16, 2001	Socorro	LINEAR	·	2.0 km	MPC · JPL
88746	2001 SY_{51}	—	September 16, 2001	Socorro	LINEAR	·	3.3 km	MPC · JPL
88747	2001 SS_{52}	—	September 16, 2001	Socorro	LINEAR	·	3.4 km	MPC · JPL
88748	2001 SD_{54}	—	September 16, 2001	Socorro	LINEAR	·	1.2 km	MPC · JPL
88749	2001 SH_{54}	—	September 16, 2001	Socorro	LINEAR	·	2.4 km	MPC · JPL
88750	2001 SW_{55}	—	September 16, 2001	Socorro	LINEAR	·	2.9 km	MPC · JPL
88751	2001 SA_{56}	—	September 16, 2001	Socorro	LINEAR	EUN	2.8 km	MPC · JPL
88752	2001 SC_{56}	—	September 16, 2001	Socorro	LINEAR	·	2.3 km	MPC · JPL
88753	2001 SM_{58}	—	September 17, 2001	Socorro	LINEAR	·	2.0 km	MPC · JPL
88754	2001 SK_{59}	—	September 17, 2001	Socorro	LINEAR	·	4.0 km	MPC · JPL
88755	2001 SL_{60}	—	September 17, 2001	Socorro	LINEAR	MAS	1.1 km	MPC · JPL
88756	2001 SN_{60}	—	September 17, 2001	Socorro	LINEAR	KOR	3.8 km	MPC · JPL
88757	2001 SS_{61}	—	September 17, 2001	Socorro	LINEAR	·	2.6 km	MPC · JPL
88758	2001 SW_{64}	—	September 17, 2001	Socorro	LINEAR	·	2.7 km	MPC · JPL
88759	2001 SF_{65}	—	September 17, 2001	Socorro	LINEAR	TIR	4.2 km	MPC · JPL
88760	2001 SG_{65}	—	September 17, 2001	Socorro	LINEAR	V	1.4 km	MPC · JPL
88761	2001 SZ_{65}	—	September 17, 2001	Socorro	LINEAR	·	2.8 km	MPC · JPL
88762	2001 SF_{66}	—	September 17, 2001	Socorro	LINEAR	·	1.4 km	MPC · JPL
88763	2001 SS_{66}	—	September 17, 2001	Socorro	LINEAR	·	3.8 km	MPC · JPL
88764	2001 SM_{67}	—	September 17, 2001	Socorro	LINEAR	·	5.1 km	MPC · JPL
88765	2001 SY_{67}	—	September 17, 2001	Socorro	LINEAR	·	2.2 km	MPC · JPL
88766	2001 SA_{68}	—	September 17, 2001	Socorro	LINEAR	V	1.4 km	MPC · JPL
88767	2001 SR_{69}	—	September 17, 2001	Socorro	LINEAR	(5)	2.5 km	MPC · JPL
88768	2001 SG_{70}	—	September 17, 2001	Socorro	LINEAR	·	4.0 km	MPC · JPL
88769	2001 SH_{71}	—	September 17, 2001	Socorro	LINEAR	ERI	5.1 km	MPC · JPL
88770	2001 ST_{72}	—	September 17, 2001	Socorro	LINEAR	(883)	1.7 km	MPC · JPL
88771	2001 SA_{73}	—	September 17, 2001	Socorro	LINEAR	·	1.4 km	MPC · JPL
88772	2001 SJ_{74}	—	September 19, 2001	Anderson Mesa	LONEOS	MAR	2.6 km	MPC · JPL
88773	2001 SK_{74}	—	September 19, 2001	Anderson Mesa	LONEOS	·	4.8 km	MPC · JPL
88774	2001 SC_{76}	—	September 19, 2001	Anderson Mesa	LONEOS	(5)	3.2 km	MPC · JPL
88775	2001 SY_{76}	—	September 16, 2001	Socorro	LINEAR	L5	10 km	MPC · JPL
88776	2001 SC_{77}	—	September 17, 2001	Socorro	LINEAR	WIT	2.0 km	MPC · JPL
88777	2001 SH_{79}	—	September 20, 2001	Socorro	LINEAR	(5)	2.7 km	MPC · JPL
88778	2001 SQ_{88}	—	September 20, 2001	Socorro	LINEAR	·	3.7 km	MPC · JPL
88779	2001 SK_{93}	—	September 20, 2001	Socorro	LINEAR	·	2.8 km	MPC · JPL
88780	2001 SE_{98}	—	September 20, 2001	Socorro	LINEAR	·	1.9 km	MPC · JPL
88781	2001 ST_{104}	—	September 20, 2001	Socorro	LINEAR	·	2.7 km	MPC · JPL
88782	2001 SF_{106}	—	September 20, 2001	Socorro	LINEAR	·	1.8 km	MPC · JPL
88783	2001 SK_{106}	—	September 20, 2001	Socorro	LINEAR	·	3.0 km	MPC · JPL
88784	2001 SO_{106}	—	September 20, 2001	Socorro	LINEAR	·	3.1 km	MPC · JPL
88785	2001 ST_{106}	—	September 20, 2001	Socorro	LINEAR	·	1.5 km	MPC · JPL
88786 Thanadelthur	2001 SG_{107}	Thanadelthur	September 20, 2001	Socorro	LINEAR	·	1.9 km	MPC · JPL
88787	2001 SS_{108}	—	September 20, 2001	Socorro	LINEAR	·	5.3 km	MPC · JPL
88788	2001 SE_{109}	—	September 20, 2001	Socorro	LINEAR	·	2.9 km	MPC · JPL
88789	2001 SC_{110}	—	September 20, 2001	Socorro	LINEAR	(2076)	1.4 km	MPC · JPL
88790	2001 SS_{110}	—	September 20, 2001	Socorro	LINEAR	·	2.8 km	MPC · JPL
88791	2001 SZ_{110}	—	September 20, 2001	Socorro	LINEAR	·	1.7 km	MPC · JPL
88792	2001 SV_{112}	—	September 18, 2001	Desert Eagle	W. K. Y. Yeung	·	1.8 km	MPC · JPL
88793	2001 SG_{114}	—	September 20, 2001	Desert Eagle	W. K. Y. Yeung	AGN	2.4 km	MPC · JPL
88794	2001 SF_{115}	—	September 20, 2001	Desert Eagle	W. K. Y. Yeung	·	2.2 km	MPC · JPL
88795 Morvan	2001 SW_{115}	Morvan	September 20, 2001	Le Creusot	J.-C. Merlin	·	3.4 km	MPC · JPL
88796	2001 SB_{116}	—	September 22, 2001	Fountain Hills	C. W. Juels, P. R. Holvorcem	·	4.0 km	MPC · JPL
88797	2001 SL_{119}	—	September 16, 2001	Socorro	LINEAR	·	1.4 km	MPC · JPL
88798	2001 SN_{119}	—	September 16, 2001	Socorro	LINEAR	·	1.5 km	MPC · JPL
88799	2001 SV_{121}	—	September 16, 2001	Socorro	LINEAR	·	4.9 km	MPC · JPL
88800	2001 SE_{122}	—	September 16, 2001	Socorro	LINEAR	(2076)	1.3 km	MPC · JPL

== 88801–88900 ==
back to top

Designation			Discovery			Properties		Ref
Permanent	Provisional	Named after	Date	Site	Discoverer(s)	Category	Diam.	Ref
88801	2001 SN_{122}	—	September 16, 2001	Socorro	LINEAR	·	2.6 km	MPC · JPL
88802	2001 SR_{124}	—	September 16, 2001	Socorro	LINEAR	HYG	5.4 km	MPC · JPL
88803	2001 SD_{129}	—	September 16, 2001	Socorro	LINEAR	MAR	2.1 km	MPC · JPL
88804	2001 SU_{129}	—	September 16, 2001	Socorro	LINEAR	AGN	2.5 km	MPC · JPL
88805	2001 SY_{129}	—	September 16, 2001	Socorro	LINEAR	·	1.6 km	MPC · JPL
88806	2001 SS_{131}	—	September 16, 2001	Socorro	LINEAR	·	2.6 km	MPC · JPL
88807	2001 SV_{134}	—	September 16, 2001	Socorro	LINEAR	KOR	2.4 km	MPC · JPL
88808	2001 SF_{135}	—	September 16, 2001	Socorro	LINEAR	·	1.1 km	MPC · JPL
88809	2001 SH_{139}	—	September 16, 2001	Socorro	LINEAR	·	2.1 km	MPC · JPL
88810	2001 SU_{142}	—	September 16, 2001	Socorro	LINEAR	·	3.0 km	MPC · JPL
88811	2001 SN_{143}	—	September 16, 2001	Socorro	LINEAR	·	1.9 km	MPC · JPL
88812	2001 SQ_{146}	—	September 16, 2001	Socorro	LINEAR	·	1.3 km	MPC · JPL
88813	2001 SJ_{147}	—	September 16, 2001	Socorro	LINEAR	·	3.7 km	MPC · JPL
88814	2001 SE_{148}	—	September 17, 2001	Socorro	LINEAR	·	2.2 km	MPC · JPL
88815	2001 SX_{149}	—	September 17, 2001	Socorro	LINEAR	·	3.1 km	MPC · JPL
88816	2001 SE_{151}	—	September 17, 2001	Socorro	LINEAR	·	1.2 km	MPC · JPL
88817	2001 SV_{151}	—	September 17, 2001	Socorro	LINEAR	·	2.2 km	MPC · JPL
88818	2001 SF_{153}	—	September 17, 2001	Socorro	LINEAR	·	3.5 km	MPC · JPL
88819	2001 SP_{153}	—	September 17, 2001	Socorro	LINEAR	·	3.5 km	MPC · JPL
88820	2001 SZ_{153}	—	September 17, 2001	Socorro	LINEAR	·	4.3 km	MPC · JPL
88821	2001 SB_{154}	—	September 17, 2001	Socorro	LINEAR	·	2.0 km	MPC · JPL
88822	2001 SK_{155}	—	September 17, 2001	Socorro	LINEAR	·	1.3 km	MPC · JPL
88823	2001 SF_{158}	—	September 17, 2001	Socorro	LINEAR	·	1.5 km	MPC · JPL
88824	2001 SM_{158}	—	September 17, 2001	Socorro	LINEAR	·	3.3 km	MPC · JPL
88825	2001 SG_{159}	—	September 17, 2001	Socorro	LINEAR	·	2.2 km	MPC · JPL
88826	2001 SM_{160}	—	September 17, 2001	Socorro	LINEAR	·	1.3 km	MPC · JPL
88827	2001 SJ_{161}	—	September 17, 2001	Socorro	LINEAR	·	3.0 km	MPC · JPL
88828	2001 SO_{161}	—	September 17, 2001	Socorro	LINEAR	·	4.1 km	MPC · JPL
88829	2001 SS_{162}	—	September 17, 2001	Socorro	LINEAR	·	3.9 km	MPC · JPL
88830	2001 SY_{162}	—	September 17, 2001	Socorro	LINEAR	MAS	1.2 km	MPC · JPL
88831	2001 SO_{163}	—	September 17, 2001	Socorro	LINEAR	·	3.6 km	MPC · JPL
88832	2001 SY_{165}	—	September 19, 2001	Socorro	LINEAR	·	2.0 km	MPC · JPL
88833	2001 SA_{169}	—	September 19, 2001	Socorro	LINEAR	MAS	1.9 km	MPC · JPL
88834	2001 SJ_{169}	—	September 19, 2001	Socorro	LINEAR	·	2.9 km	MPC · JPL
88835	2001 SX_{171}	—	September 16, 2001	Socorro	LINEAR	·	2.6 km	MPC · JPL
88836	2001 SC_{175}	—	September 16, 2001	Socorro	LINEAR	·	3.2 km	MPC · JPL
88837	2001 SL_{175}	—	September 16, 2001	Socorro	LINEAR	NYS	3.4 km	MPC · JPL
88838	2001 SS_{175}	—	September 16, 2001	Socorro	LINEAR	·	4.2 km	MPC · JPL
88839	2001 SJ_{176}	—	September 16, 2001	Socorro	LINEAR	·	2.7 km	MPC · JPL
88840	2001 SC_{177}	—	September 16, 2001	Socorro	LINEAR	·	3.5 km	MPC · JPL
88841	2001 SZ_{177}	—	September 17, 2001	Socorro	LINEAR	·	1.5 km	MPC · JPL
88842	2001 SF_{178}	—	September 17, 2001	Socorro	LINEAR	(12739)	3.8 km	MPC · JPL
88843	2001 SK_{178}	—	September 17, 2001	Socorro	LINEAR	·	1.2 km	MPC · JPL
88844	2001 SE_{179}	—	September 17, 2001	Socorro	LINEAR	·	3.6 km	MPC · JPL
88845	2001 SN_{179}	—	September 17, 2001	Socorro	LINEAR	·	6.5 km	MPC · JPL
88846	2001 SJ_{180}	—	September 19, 2001	Socorro	LINEAR	·	2.8 km	MPC · JPL
88847	2001 SN_{191}	—	September 19, 2001	Socorro	LINEAR	MIS	3.2 km	MPC · JPL
88848	2001 ST_{202}	—	September 19, 2001	Socorro	LINEAR	·	1.6 km	MPC · JPL
88849	2001 SB_{205}	—	September 19, 2001	Socorro	LINEAR	V	1.0 km	MPC · JPL
88850	2001 SL_{222}	—	September 19, 2001	Socorro	LINEAR	·	3.4 km	MPC · JPL
88851	2001 SW_{222}	—	September 19, 2001	Socorro	LINEAR	·	4.2 km	MPC · JPL
88852	2001 SN_{230}	—	September 19, 2001	Socorro	LINEAR	·	2.8 km	MPC · JPL
88853	2001 ST_{231}	—	September 19, 2001	Socorro	LINEAR	·	1.4 km	MPC · JPL
88854	2001 SD_{235}	—	September 19, 2001	Socorro	LINEAR	·	4.7 km	MPC · JPL
88855	2001 SD_{236}	—	September 19, 2001	Socorro	LINEAR	·	4.5 km	MPC · JPL
88856	2001 SE_{237}	—	September 19, 2001	Socorro	LINEAR	·	2.1 km	MPC · JPL
88857	2001 SK_{237}	—	September 19, 2001	Socorro	LINEAR	·	1.6 km	MPC · JPL
88858	2001 SN_{240}	—	September 19, 2001	Socorro	LINEAR	·	3.7 km	MPC · JPL
88859	2001 SF_{245}	—	September 19, 2001	Socorro	LINEAR	·	3.0 km	MPC · JPL
88860	2001 SO_{247}	—	September 19, 2001	Socorro	LINEAR	·	4.3 km	MPC · JPL
88861	2001 SR_{247}	—	September 19, 2001	Socorro	LINEAR	·	3.3 km	MPC · JPL
88862	2001 SF_{249}	—	September 19, 2001	Socorro	LINEAR	KOR	2.9 km	MPC · JPL
88863	2001 SP_{249}	—	September 19, 2001	Socorro	LINEAR	·	1.9 km	MPC · JPL
88864	2001 SY_{250}	—	September 19, 2001	Socorro	LINEAR	·	4.1 km	MPC · JPL
88865	2001 ST_{251}	—	September 19, 2001	Socorro	LINEAR	·	6.0 km	MPC · JPL
88866	2001 SW_{251}	—	September 19, 2001	Socorro	LINEAR	·	3.6 km	MPC · JPL
88867	2001 SN_{252}	—	September 19, 2001	Socorro	LINEAR	AST	2.9 km	MPC · JPL
88868	2001 SF_{253}	—	September 19, 2001	Socorro	LINEAR	NYS	2.1 km	MPC · JPL
88869	2001 ST_{256}	—	September 19, 2001	Socorro	LINEAR	MAS	2.0 km	MPC · JPL
88870	2001 SF_{260}	—	September 20, 2001	Socorro	LINEAR	·	5.0 km	MPC · JPL
88871	2001 SG_{260}	—	September 20, 2001	Socorro	LINEAR	KOR	2.7 km	MPC · JPL
88872	2001 SV_{260}	—	September 20, 2001	Socorro	LINEAR	PAD	5.2 km	MPC · JPL
88873	2001 SY_{260}	—	September 20, 2001	Socorro	LINEAR	·	3.5 km	MPC · JPL
88874 Wongshingsheuk	2001 SV_{264}	Wongshingsheuk	September 25, 2001	Desert Eagle	W. K. Y. Yeung	KOR	3.4 km	MPC · JPL
88875 Posky	2001 SB_{265}	Posky	September 25, 2001	Desert Eagle	W. K. Y. Yeung	(5)	2.0 km	MPC · JPL
88876	2001 SD_{265}	—	September 25, 2001	Desert Eagle	W. K. Y. Yeung	·	3.6 km	MPC · JPL
88877	2001 SJ_{265}	—	September 25, 2001	Desert Eagle	W. K. Y. Yeung	·	3.4 km	MPC · JPL
88878 Bowenyueli	2001 SQ_{266}	Bowenyueli	September 25, 2001	Desert Eagle	W. K. Y. Yeung	·	4.0 km	MPC · JPL
88879 Sungjaoyiu	2001 SA_{268}	Sungjaoyiu	September 25, 2001	Desert Eagle	W. K. Y. Yeung	·	2.5 km	MPC · JPL
88880	2001 SF_{270}	—	September 25, 2001	Fountain Hills	C. W. Juels, P. R. Holvorcem	·	3.7 km	MPC · JPL
88881	2001 SW_{278}	—	September 21, 2001	Anderson Mesa	LONEOS	·	2.0 km	MPC · JPL
88882	2001 ST_{279}	—	September 21, 2001	Anderson Mesa	LONEOS	(7744)	3.5 km	MPC · JPL
88883	2001 SY_{280}	—	September 21, 2001	Anderson Mesa	LONEOS	·	4.8 km	MPC · JPL
88884	2001 SX_{282}	—	September 22, 2001	Socorro	LINEAR	·	3.1 km	MPC · JPL
88885	2001 SD_{283}	—	September 22, 2001	Socorro	LINEAR	·	3.8 km	MPC · JPL
88886	2001 SA_{286}	—	September 28, 2001	Fountain Hills	C. W. Juels, P. R. Holvorcem	·	3.9 km	MPC · JPL
88887	2001 SD_{288}	—	September 27, 2001	Palomar	NEAT	TIR	5.3 km	MPC · JPL
88888	2001 SE_{288}	—	September 27, 2001	Palomar	NEAT	·	2.8 km	MPC · JPL
88889	2001 SR_{291}	—	September 17, 2001	Anderson Mesa	LONEOS	·	4.2 km	MPC · JPL
88890	2001 SJ_{292}	—	September 16, 2001	Socorro	LINEAR	·	2.4 km	MPC · JPL
88891	2001 SX_{298}	—	September 20, 2001	Socorro	LINEAR	·	3.8 km	MPC · JPL
88892	2001 SP_{305}	—	September 20, 2001	Socorro	LINEAR	KOR	2.6 km	MPC · JPL
88893	2001 SE_{306}	—	September 20, 2001	Socorro	LINEAR	·	6.0 km	MPC · JPL
88894	2001 SX_{313}	—	September 21, 2001	Socorro	LINEAR	·	4.5 km	MPC · JPL
88895	2001 SC_{322}	—	September 25, 2001	Socorro	LINEAR	·	3.1 km	MPC · JPL
88896	2001 SB_{342}	—	September 21, 2001	Palomar	NEAT	·	2.9 km	MPC · JPL
88897	2001 SM_{342}	—	September 21, 2001	Anderson Mesa	LONEOS	V	1.5 km	MPC · JPL
88898	2001 SN_{343}	—	September 22, 2001	Palomar	NEAT	MAR	2.8 km	MPC · JPL
88899	2001 SB_{346}	—	September 23, 2001	Anderson Mesa	LONEOS	·	5.2 km	MPC · JPL
88900	2001 SC_{346}	—	September 25, 2001	Socorro	LINEAR	DOR	7.0 km	MPC · JPL

== 88901–89000 ==
back to top

Designation			Discovery			Properties		Ref
Permanent	Provisional	Named after	Date	Site	Discoverer(s)	Category	Diam.	Ref
88901	2001 SA_{347}	—	September 25, 2001	Socorro	LINEAR	·	5.8 km	MPC · JPL
88902	2001 SF_{349}	—	September 26, 2001	Socorro	LINEAR	·	3.3 km	MPC · JPL
88903	2001 TL	—	October 6, 2001	Palomar	NEAT	·	2.0 km	MPC · JPL
88904	2001 TF_{1}	—	October 7, 2001	Palomar	NEAT	·	1.5 km	MPC · JPL
88905	2001 TN_{1}	—	October 11, 2001	Farpoint	Farpoint	·	2.4 km	MPC · JPL
88906 Moutier	2001 TT_{1}	Moutier	October 11, 2001	Vicques	M. Ory	·	3.5 km	MPC · JPL
88907	2001 TY_{2}	—	October 7, 2001	Palomar	NEAT	·	2.5 km	MPC · JPL
88908	2001 TZ_{4}	—	October 8, 2001	Palomar	NEAT	·	2.3 km	MPC · JPL
88909	2001 TG_{7}	—	October 13, 2001	Kleť	Kleť	·	3.2 km	MPC · JPL
88910	2001 TZ_{7}	—	October 11, 2001	Desert Eagle	W. K. Y. Yeung	·	2.6 km	MPC · JPL
88911	2001 TN_{8}	—	October 9, 2001	Socorro	LINEAR	·	4.0 km	MPC · JPL
88912	2001 TS_{8}	—	October 9, 2001	Socorro	LINEAR	·	2.6 km	MPC · JPL
88913	2001 TG_{9}	—	October 9, 2001	Socorro	LINEAR	·	2.6 km	MPC · JPL
88914	2001 TQ_{9}	—	October 13, 2001	Socorro	LINEAR	·	1.7 km	MPC · JPL
88915	2001 TG_{10}	—	October 13, 2001	Socorro	LINEAR	·	3.4 km	MPC · JPL
88916	2001 TS_{10}	—	October 13, 2001	Socorro	LINEAR	EUN	4.5 km	MPC · JPL
88917	2001 TZ_{10}	—	October 13, 2001	Socorro	LINEAR	·	5.9 km	MPC · JPL
88918	2001 TN_{11}	—	October 13, 2001	Socorro	LINEAR	·	2.2 km	MPC · JPL
88919	2001 TC_{12}	—	October 13, 2001	Socorro	LINEAR	NYS	2.0 km	MPC · JPL
88920	2001 TO_{12}	—	October 13, 2001	Socorro	LINEAR	·	6.5 km	MPC · JPL
88921	2001 TR_{12}	—	October 13, 2001	Socorro	LINEAR	·	1.6 km	MPC · JPL
88922	2001 TK_{14}	—	October 6, 2001	Palomar	NEAT	·	7.6 km	MPC · JPL
88923	2001 TR_{14}	—	October 7, 2001	Palomar	NEAT	·	2.1 km	MPC · JPL
88924	2001 TZ_{17}	—	October 14, 2001	Desert Eagle	W. K. Y. Yeung	·	4.2 km	MPC · JPL
88925	2001 TC_{18}	—	October 14, 2001	Desert Eagle	W. K. Y. Yeung	(5)	2.3 km	MPC · JPL
88926	2001 TA_{20}	—	October 9, 2001	Socorro	LINEAR	·	2.8 km	MPC · JPL
88927	2001 TQ_{20}	—	October 9, 2001	Socorro	LINEAR	·	2.7 km	MPC · JPL
88928	2001 TE_{21}	—	October 9, 2001	Socorro	LINEAR	·	4.1 km	MPC · JPL
88929	2001 TR_{22}	—	October 13, 2001	Socorro	LINEAR	·	2.9 km	MPC · JPL
88930	2001 TR_{23}	—	October 14, 2001	Socorro	LINEAR	·	3.6 km	MPC · JPL
88931	2001 TZ_{25}	—	October 14, 2001	Socorro	LINEAR	·	1.8 km	MPC · JPL
88932	2001 TG_{31}	—	October 14, 2001	Socorro	LINEAR	·	2.9 km	MPC · JPL
88933	2001 TB_{32}	—	October 14, 2001	Socorro	LINEAR	ADE	6.2 km	MPC · JPL
88934	2001 TE_{32}	—	October 14, 2001	Socorro	LINEAR	·	3.7 km	MPC · JPL
88935	2001 TF_{32}	—	October 14, 2001	Socorro	LINEAR	CYB	7.0 km	MPC · JPL
88936	2001 TN_{32}	—	October 14, 2001	Socorro	LINEAR	·	1.7 km	MPC · JPL
88937	2001 TQ_{33}	—	October 14, 2001	Socorro	LINEAR	·	1.7 km	MPC · JPL
88938	2001 TR_{33}	—	October 14, 2001	Socorro	LINEAR	·	1.1 km	MPC · JPL
88939	2001 TX_{33}	—	October 14, 2001	Socorro	LINEAR	·	5.8 km	MPC · JPL
88940	2001 TA_{34}	—	October 14, 2001	Socorro	LINEAR	·	6.6 km	MPC · JPL
88941	2001 TO_{34}	—	October 14, 2001	Socorro	LINEAR	·	4.1 km	MPC · JPL
88942	2001 TK_{35}	—	October 14, 2001	Socorro	LINEAR	ADE	5.5 km	MPC · JPL
88943	2001 TR_{35}	—	October 14, 2001	Socorro	LINEAR	·	1.8 km	MPC · JPL
88944	2001 TF_{36}	—	October 14, 2001	Socorro	LINEAR	V	1.3 km	MPC · JPL
88945	2001 TW_{36}	—	October 14, 2001	Socorro	LINEAR	·	5.3 km	MPC · JPL
88946	2001 TD_{37}	—	October 14, 2001	Socorro	LINEAR	V	1.4 km	MPC · JPL
88947	2001 TF_{37}	—	October 14, 2001	Socorro	LINEAR	·	2.9 km	MPC · JPL
88948	2001 TU_{37}	—	October 14, 2001	Socorro	LINEAR	V	2.3 km	MPC · JPL
88949	2001 TH_{38}	—	October 14, 2001	Socorro	LINEAR	V	1.7 km	MPC · JPL
88950	2001 TL_{38}	—	October 14, 2001	Socorro	LINEAR	·	3.6 km	MPC · JPL
88951	2001 TM_{38}	—	October 14, 2001	Socorro	LINEAR	·	2.6 km	MPC · JPL
88952	2001 TW_{38}	—	October 14, 2001	Socorro	LINEAR	·	2.4 km	MPC · JPL
88953	2001 TC_{39}	—	October 14, 2001	Socorro	LINEAR	·	1.9 km	MPC · JPL
88954	2001 TE_{42}	—	October 14, 2001	Socorro	LINEAR	·	2.7 km	MPC · JPL
88955	2001 TW_{42}	—	October 14, 2001	Socorro	LINEAR	·	3.5 km	MPC · JPL
88956	2001 TF_{43}	—	October 14, 2001	Socorro	LINEAR	·	3.3 km	MPC · JPL
88957	2001 TT_{44}	—	October 14, 2001	Socorro	LINEAR	·	3.1 km	MPC · JPL
88958	2001 TV_{44}	—	October 14, 2001	Socorro	LINEAR	V	1.6 km	MPC · JPL
88959	2001 TZ_{44}	—	October 14, 2001	Socorro	LINEAR	APO +1km	1.1 km	MPC · JPL
88960	2001 TN_{45}	—	October 14, 2001	Desert Eagle	W. K. Y. Yeung	HOF	6.4 km	MPC · JPL
88961 Valpertile	2001 TH_{47}	Valpertile	October 14, 2001	Cima Ekar	ADAS	·	4.5 km	MPC · JPL
88962	2001 TR_{50}	—	October 13, 2001	Socorro	LINEAR	·	1.2 km	MPC · JPL
88963	2001 TX_{53}	—	October 13, 2001	Socorro	LINEAR	·	2.1 km	MPC · JPL
88964	2001 TX_{54}	—	October 14, 2001	Socorro	LINEAR	·	4.6 km	MPC · JPL
88965	2001 TA_{55}	—	October 14, 2001	Socorro	LINEAR	·	2.9 km	MPC · JPL
88966	2001 TC_{56}	—	October 15, 2001	Socorro	LINEAR	·	2.7 km	MPC · JPL
88967	2001 TG_{56}	—	October 15, 2001	Socorro	LINEAR	MAR	2.5 km	MPC · JPL
88968	2001 TN_{57}	—	October 13, 2001	Socorro	LINEAR	·	1.3 km	MPC · JPL
88969	2001 TU_{57}	—	October 13, 2001	Socorro	LINEAR	·	7.3 km	MPC · JPL
88970	2001 TQ_{58}	—	October 13, 2001	Socorro	LINEAR	·	3.4 km	MPC · JPL
88971	2001 TS_{58}	—	October 13, 2001	Socorro	LINEAR	·	3.7 km	MPC · JPL
88972	2001 TT_{58}	—	October 13, 2001	Socorro	LINEAR	·	5.2 km	MPC · JPL
88973	2001 TA_{59}	—	October 13, 2001	Socorro	LINEAR	AGN	2.2 km	MPC · JPL
88974	2001 TD_{59}	—	October 13, 2001	Socorro	LINEAR	MAS	1.3 km	MPC · JPL
88975	2001 TH_{59}	—	October 13, 2001	Socorro	LINEAR	·	2.6 km	MPC · JPL
88976	2001 TN_{60}	—	October 13, 2001	Socorro	LINEAR	·	2.6 km	MPC · JPL
88977	2001 TL_{62}	—	October 13, 2001	Socorro	LINEAR	·	2.7 km	MPC · JPL
88978	2001 TR_{62}	—	October 13, 2001	Socorro	LINEAR	·	3.9 km	MPC · JPL
88979	2001 TG_{63}	—	October 13, 2001	Socorro	LINEAR	MAS	1.5 km	MPC · JPL
88980	2001 TQ_{64}	—	October 13, 2001	Socorro	LINEAR	(5)	3.1 km	MPC · JPL
88981	2001 TW_{65}	—	October 13, 2001	Socorro	LINEAR	V	1.8 km	MPC · JPL
88982	2001 TA_{66}	—	October 13, 2001	Socorro	LINEAR	V	2.0 km	MPC · JPL
88983	2001 TV_{67}	—	October 13, 2001	Socorro	LINEAR	·	5.4 km	MPC · JPL
88984	2001 TW_{67}	—	October 13, 2001	Socorro	LINEAR	NYS	2.0 km	MPC · JPL
88985	2001 TG_{68}	—	October 13, 2001	Socorro	LINEAR	V · fast	1.7 km	MPC · JPL
88986	2001 TW_{70}	—	October 13, 2001	Socorro	LINEAR	·	3.7 km	MPC · JPL
88987	2001 TF_{71}	—	October 13, 2001	Socorro	LINEAR	·	1.5 km	MPC · JPL
88988	2001 TO_{71}	—	October 13, 2001	Socorro	LINEAR	KOR	3.4 km	MPC · JPL
88989	2001 TQ_{71}	—	October 13, 2001	Socorro	LINEAR	·	5.0 km	MPC · JPL
88990	2001 TT_{71}	—	October 13, 2001	Socorro	LINEAR	·	2.7 km	MPC · JPL
88991	2001 TV_{71}	—	October 13, 2001	Socorro	LINEAR	GEF	2.4 km	MPC · JPL
88992	2001 TJ_{72}	—	October 13, 2001	Socorro	LINEAR	MAS	1.4 km	MPC · JPL
88993	2001 TF_{74}	—	October 13, 2001	Socorro	LINEAR	·	6.3 km	MPC · JPL
88994	2001 TX_{74}	—	October 13, 2001	Socorro	LINEAR	·	2.3 km	MPC · JPL
88995	2001 TR_{75}	—	October 13, 2001	Socorro	LINEAR	EOS	3.4 km	MPC · JPL
88996	2001 TY_{75}	—	October 13, 2001	Socorro	LINEAR	·	5.6 km	MPC · JPL
88997	2001 TG_{76}	—	October 13, 2001	Socorro	LINEAR	·	3.6 km	MPC · JPL
88998	2001 TV_{76}	—	October 13, 2001	Socorro	LINEAR	·	3.6 km	MPC · JPL
88999	2001 TH_{77}	—	October 13, 2001	Socorro	LINEAR	·	1.6 km	MPC · JPL
89000	2001 TD_{78}	—	October 13, 2001	Socorro	LINEAR	·	2.8 km	MPC · JPL

back to top

== See also ==
- Meanings of minor-planet names: 88001–89000
