= Meanings of minor-planet names: 88001–89000 =

As minor planet discoveries are confirmed, they are given a permanent number by the IAU's Minor Planet Center (MPC), and the discoverers can then submit names for them, following the IAU's naming conventions. The list below concerns those minor planets in the specified number-range that have received names, and explains the meanings of those names.

Official naming citations of newly named small Solar System bodies are approved and published in a bulletin by IAU's Working Group for Small Bodies Nomenclature (WGSBN). Before May 2021, citations were published in MPC's Minor Planet Circulars for many decades. Recent citations can also be found on the JPL Small-Body Database (SBDB). Until his death in 2016, German astronomer Lutz D. Schmadel compiled these citations into the Dictionary of Minor Planet Names (DMP) and regularly updated the collection.

Based on Paul Herget's The Names of the Minor Planets, Schmadel also researched the unclear origin of numerous asteroids, most of which had been named prior to World War II. This article incorporates text from this source, which is in the public domain: SBDB New namings may only be added to this list below after official publication as the preannouncement of names is condemned. The WGSBN publishes a comprehensive guideline for the naming rules of non-cometary small Solar System bodies.

== 88001–88100 ==
Named minor planet	Provisional	This minor planet was named for...	Ref · Catalog
88055 Ghaf	2000 VA_{28}	Prosopis cineraria, known as ghaf, is a flowering tree that is part of legume family and is native to West Asia and parts of the Indian subcontinent. It is the national tree of the United Arab Emirates and is a target of the UAE's MBR Explorer space probe.	JPL · 88055
88071 Taniguchijiro	2000 VO_{59}	Taniguchi Jiro (1947–2017), a Japanese manga artist who was awarded the French ministry of Culture's Chevalier de l´Ordre des arts et des Lettres in 2011. His main works are "Chichi no koyomi" ("Le journal de mon pere"), "Bocchan no jidai" ("Au temps de Botchan") and "Harukana machi-e" ("Quartier lointain").	JPL · 88071

== 88101–88200 ==
back to top

Named minor planet	Provisional	This minor planet was named for...	Ref · Catalog
88146 Castello	2000 WE_{183}	The archaeological site Castello lies on a hill in the Swiss village of Tremona. This site contains human settlements from the fifth millennium B.C. to the thirteenth century A.D	JPL · 88146

== 88201–88300 ==
back to top

Named minor planet	Provisional	This minor planet was named for...	Ref · Catalog
88260 Insubria	2001 HE_{23}	Regio Insubria, the old Latin name of western Lombardia, northern Italy, home of the discovery site	JPL · 88260
88270 Alanhoward	2001 KB_{78}	Alan D. Howard (born 1939), American planetary scientist.	JPL · 88270
88292 Bora-Bora	2001 NL_{6}	Bora Bora, French Polynesia. The tropical island, located 240 km northwest of Tahiti, is famed for its multicolored lagoon. Formerly Mai Te Pora ("created by the gods"), Bora Bora means "first born", because it was the first to emerge from the waters after the creation of Raiatea, some seven million years ago.	JPL · 88292
88297 Huikilolani	2001 NP_{14}	"Hui Kilolani" is the Hawaiian Astronomical Society's Hawaiian name, which means "club of sky watchers" (Src).	JPL · 88297

== 88301–88400 ==
back to top

Named minor planet	Provisional	This minor planet was named for...	Ref · Catalog
88371 Ilariamazzanti	2001 PF_{15}	Ilaria Mazzanti, Italian amateur astronomer.	IAU · 88371

== 88401–88500 ==
back to top

Named minor planet	Provisional	This minor planet was named for...	Ref · Catalog
88470 Joaquinescrig	2001 QB_{111}	Joaquín Escrig Ferrando (1945–1999) cousin and friend of Spanish discoverer Rafael Ferrando. He was an inspiration to him in his desire for living and strength in overcoming adversity.	JPL · 88470

== 88501–88600 ==
back to top

Named minor planet	Provisional	This minor planet was named for...	Ref · Catalog
There are no named minor planets in this number range

== 88601–88700 ==
back to top

Named minor planet	Provisional	This minor planet was named for...	Ref · Catalog
88611 Teharonhiawako	2001 QT_{297}	Teharonhiawako, son of the granddaughter of the Great Spirit creation god, in the Haudenosaunee (Iroquois) creation myth, and his twin brother Sawiskera ((88611) Teharonhiawako I Sawiskera)	JPL · 88611

== 88701–88800 ==
back to top

Named minor planet	Provisional	This minor planet was named for...	Ref · Catalog
88705 Potato	2001 SV	The potato, on the occasion of the United Nations' International Year of the Potato (2008), and because many minor planets are believed to be shaped like potatoes	JPL · 88705
88786 Thanadelthur	2001 SG_{107}	As a young Denśoliné woman captured into slavery, Thanadelthur (1697–1717) became a skilled interpreter and negotiator. Known as the Ambassadress of Peace, she enabled a mutually beneficial economy for Denśoliné, Cree, and English fur traders west of Hudson's Bay. A commemorative plaque erected in 2017 in Churchill, Manitoba honors her short life.	IAU · 88786
88795 Morvan	2001 SW_{115}	Morvan massif, the northern part of the Massif Central of France	JPL · 88795

== 88801–88900 ==
back to top

Named minor planet	Provisional	This minor planet was named for...	Ref · Catalog
88874 Wongshingsheuk	2001 SV_{264}	Wong Shing Sheuk (born 1951) began teaching in 1974. From 1988 to his retirement in 2011, he was the principal of Po Leung Kuk Leung Chow Shan Primary School P.M. He believed that astronomy could inspire a student's interest in science and he put tremendous effort into astronomy education.	JPL · 88874
88875 Posky	2001 SB_{265}	The Hong Kong Po Leung Kuk Education Department for their efforts over the past seven years in supporting student exploration of the sky.	JPL · 88875
88878 Bowenyueli	2001 SQ_{266}	The motto of the Chinese University of Hong Kong is bowenyueli, which means "Through learning and temperance to virtue". These words of Confucius have long been considered a principal precept of his teaching. The university lays equal emphasis on the intellectual and moral aspects of education	JPL · 88878
88879 Sungjaoyiu	2001 SA_{268}	Joseph Jao-yiu Sung (born 1959) is the vice-chancellor of the Chinese University of Hong Kong, associate dean of the Faculty of Medicine and head of Shaw College. During the 2003 atypical pneumonia, Sung played a leading role in combating the disease and was called "Asia Hero" by Time magazine	JPL · 88879

== 88901–89000 ==
back to top

Named minor planet	Provisional	This minor planet was named for...	Ref · Catalog
88906 Moutier	2001 TT_{1}	The Swiss village of Moutier, located in the Bernese Jura	JPL · 88906
88961 Valpertile	2001 TH_{47}	Valerio Pertile (1932–2005) was a skilled and dedicated Italian astronomical technician and night assistant at the Schmidt telescope of the Asiago Station from 1965 to 2000. He took the major fraction of the 16,000 plates acquired with that telescope, a most precious archive of photographic data.	JPL · 88961

back to top

Preceded by 87,001–88,000	Meanings of minor-planet names List of minor planets: 88,001–89,000	Succeeded by 89,001–90,000
