= SL-9 =

SL-9 or SL9 may refer to:

- Proton (rocket family), type 8K82, used from 1965-1966
- Heckler & Koch SL8, a semi-automatic rifle
- Comet Shoemaker–Levy 9, a former comet
- SL.9 (Type E), a type of Schütte-Lanz airship.
- (88710) 2001 SL9, a sub-kilometer asteroid and binary system
- London Buses route SL9
- SL9, a postcode district in the SL postcode area in the United Kingdom
- Seoul Line9, a joint venture that operates phase 1 of Seoul Subway Line 9
- China Railway class SL9, a type of steam locomotive
