= (88710) 2001 SL9 =

Near-Earth asteroid

(88710) 2001 SL_{9}
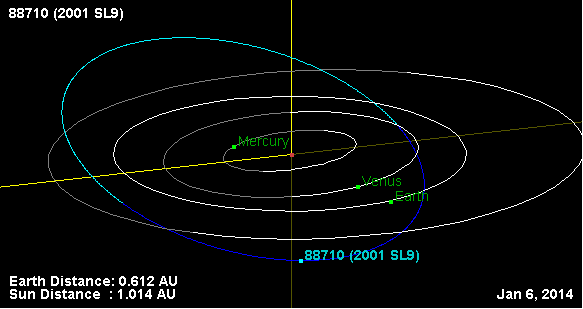
- Orbit of 2001 SL_{9}

Discovery
- Discovered by: NEAT
- Discovery site: Palomar Obs.
- Discovery date: 18 September 2001

Orbital characteristics
- Epoch 13 January 2016 (JD 2457400.5)
- Uncertainty parameter 0
- Observation arc: 22318 days (61.10 yr)
- Aphelion: 1.3480 AU (201.66 Gm)
- Perihelion: 0.77471 AU (115.895 Gm)
- Semi-major axis: 1.0613 AU (158.77 Gm)
- Eccentricity: 0.27006
- Orbital period (sidereal): 1.09 yr (399.37 d)
- Mean anomaly: 239.06°
- Mean motion: 0° 54^{m} 5.112^{s} / day
- Inclination: 21.900°
- Longitude of ascending node: 202.86°
- Argument of perihelion: 329.30°
- Known satellites: 1
- Earth MOID: 0.197987 AU (29.6184 Gm)
- Jupiter MOID: 3.64009 AU (544.550 Gm)

Physical characteristics
- Mean diameter: 1 km (0.62 mi)
- Mass: 10^{9} mt
- Mean density: 1.8 g/cm^{3}
- Equatorial surface gravity: 0.02565 mm/s^{2}
- Equatorial escape velocity: 0.05116 mm/s
- Synodic rotation period: 2.4004 h (0.10002 d)
- Sidereal rotation period: 2.40035±0.00005 hours
- Geometric albedo: 0.16
- Temperature: 230-303 K (-43-30°C)
- Absolute magnitude (H): 17.6

(88710) 2001 SL_{9} is a sub-kilometer asteroid and binary system, classified as a near-Earth object of Apollo group discovered by NEAT at Palomar Observatory on 18 September 2001. It measures approximately 960 meters in diameter, while its 2001-discovered minor-planet moon has an estimated diameter of 200 meters based on a secondary to primary size ratio of 0.28.

== Near-Earth asteroid ==
Although 2001 SL_{9} is classified as a near-Earth object, it does not pose any threats. It has never, nor will it ever in the next century, come closer than 15,000,000 km (0.1 AU) from Earth or Venus. However, the asteroid would make a good target for a spacecraft flyby, as a flyby to 2001 SL_{9} would only require a delta-v of 5.4 km/s.

== Moon ==
2001 SL_{9} has one minor-planet moon. It was discovered from lightcurve observations made by Czech astronomer Petr Pravec and collaborators. This moon is approximately 200 m (660 ft) in diameter. Its semi-major axis is 1.6 km (0.99 mi) and its orbital period is 16.4 hours.
