= 88611 Teharonhiawako =

Trans-Neptunian object

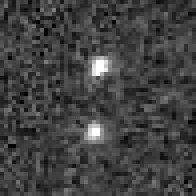
- Hubble Space Telescope image of Teharonhiawako and its companion Sawiskera, taken in 2010

Discovery
- Discovered by: Deep Ecliptic Survey
- Discovery date: 20 August 2001

Designations
- Pronunciation: Mohawk: [d̥ɛhaɺũhjáːɰaɡo]
- Alternative designations: 2001 QT_{297}
- Minor planet category: TNO · cubewano cold

Orbital characteristics
- Epoch 13 January 2016 (JD 2457400.5)
- Uncertainty parameter 3
- Observation arc: 4463 days (12.22 yr)
- Aphelion: 45.235 AU (6.7671 Tm)
- Perihelion: 42.454 AU (6.3510 Tm)
- Semi-major axis: 43.845 AU (6.5591 Tm)
- Eccentricity: 0.031712
- Orbital period (sidereal): 290.32 yr (106041 d)
- Mean anomaly: 158.44°
- Mean motion: 0.0033949°/day
- Inclination: 2.5834°
- Longitude of ascending node: 304.78°
- Argument of perihelion: 236.43°
- Known satellites: Sawiskera [zaɰískɛɺa]

Physical characteristics
- Mean diameter: 220+41 −44 km (combined); 178+33 −36 km (primary); 129+24 −26 km (secondary)
- Mass: (2.445±0.032)×10^{18} kg
- Mean density: 1.15+0.87 −0.91 g/cm^{3}
- Sidereal rotation period: 4.7526±0.0007 h
- Geometric albedo: 0.145+0.086 −0.045
- Absolute magnitude (H): 6.00±0.13; 5.8

88611 Teharonhiawako (provisional designation 2001 QT_{297}) is a trans-Neptunian object and a member of the cold classical Kuiper belt. Teharonhiawako was discovered on 20 August 2001, by the Deep Ecliptic Survey, and its companion, Sawiskera, was identified a month later. The primary is named after Teharonhia꞉wako, a god of maize in the Iroquois creation myth, while the secondary is named after his evil twin brother Sawiskera. The objects were named in 2007.

The pair form a binary minor planet, which orbit each other. Their orbit has the following parameters: semi-major axis—27670±120 km, period—828.76±0.22 days, eccentricity—0.2494±0.0021 and inclination—144.42±0.35° (retrograde). The total system mass is about 2.4×10^{18} kg.

The primary measures about 220 km in diameter. The large companion is named Sawiskera (formally designated (88611) Teharonhiawako I), which at 126 km in diameter is about two-thirds the size of its primary. The two components together are known as the Teharonhiawako–Sawiskera binary system.
