= Politico (disambiguation) =

Politico is an American news media company.

Politico may also refer to:

- Politico Europe, a publication headquartered in Belgium
- Politico (album) by Mexican Institute of Sound
- Colloquially, a politician or political operative

== See also ==
- Politico's Publishing, an imprint of Methuen Publishing
- Politico-media complex, interaction between media and government
- Politics (disambiguation)
