= Pignata =

Pignata may refer to:

- Pignata (pot) or pignatta, a clay cooking pot in Italian cuisine
- 89664 Pignata, a minor planet
- Francesco Pignata (born 1978), Italian javelin thrower
- Tony Pignata, Australian football administrator

== See also ==
- Piñata (disambiguation)
