= Political Science (disambiguation) =

Political science is a social science dealing with politics and systems of government.

Political science may also refer to:

- Political Science (journal)
- "Political Science" (song), a 1972 song by Randy Newman

== See also ==
- Politicization of science
- Politics (disambiguation)
- Science (disambiguation)
- Poli sci (disambiguation)
