= Poly Sci (disambiguation) =

Poly Sci is a 1998 album by John Forté.

Poly Sci may also refer to:

- Poly-Sci, drummer for the band Pompeii 99

== See also ==
- Poly.Sci.187, a 2007 album by Sole
- Political science (poli sci), a social science that deals with politics and systems of government
- Political Science (disambiguation)
- Politics (disambiguation)
