= Méjico Máxico =

Studio album by Mexican Institute of Sound
- Released: January 24, 2006
- Recorded: 2006
- Genre: Electronic
- Label: Nacional Records
- Producer: Camilo Lara

Mexican Institute of Sound chronology
Méjico Máxico (2006)	Piñata (2007)

Méjico Máxico is the debut album of Mexican Institute of Sound, a one-man band led by Camilo Lara. The album contains 15 tracks which sample sounds as diverse as Mexican and Latin American folk music. Music magazine editors have described the band as one of the biggest pioneers of Mexican Electronica.

The album has received plenty of praise upon release and some critics have drawn LCD Soundsystem as one of its main influences.

== Track listing ==
1. "Bienvenidos A Mi Disco"
2. "OK!"
3. "Mirando A Las Muchachas"
4. "Jaja Pipi"
5. "Buena Idea"
6. "Drume Negrita"
7. "CyberMambo"
8. "Juan Rulfo"
9. "Corasound"
10. "Canción De Amor Para Mi Futura Novia"
11. "Sabrosa"
12. "Hey Tia!"
13. "Que Rico"
14. "Dub-A El Tiempo Es Muy Largo"
15. "No Hay Masa Ya"
