= Piñata (disambiguation) =

A piñata is a brightly colored papier-mâché, cardboard, or clay container, originating from Mexico.

Piñata or pinata may also refer to:

== Film and television ==
- Piñata (film), a 2005 Australian animated short film
- Piñata: Survival Island, or Demon Island, a 2002 horror film
- "Piñata" (Better Call Saul), a 2018 TV episode

== Music ==
- Piñata (Freddie Gibbs and Madlib album), 2014
- Piñata (Mexican Institute of Sound album), 2007
- "Piñata", a song by Chevelle from Hats Off to the Bull, 2011

== Other uses ==
- Piñata Books, an imprint of Arte Público Press
- Piñata cookie, a sugar cookie
- Piñata sandinista, the privatization of public and seized goods for Sandinista officials.

== See also ==
- including pinata
