= Mexican Institute of Sound =

Electronic music project

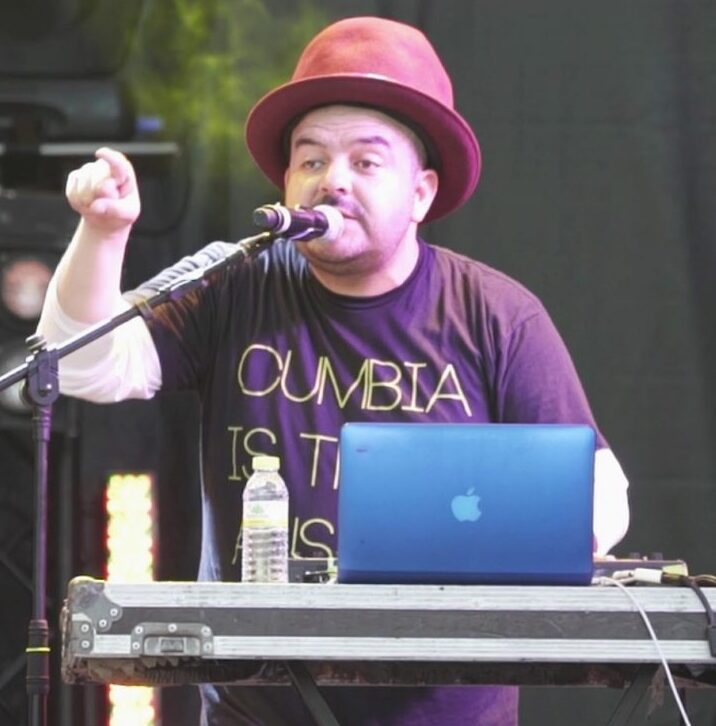
- Mexican Institute of Sound performing in Madrid in 2017

Background information
- Origin: Mexico City, Mexican Federal District, Mexico
- Genres: Electronic, alternative rock, alternative dance, electro, experimental, Mexican music
- Years active: 2004–present
- Label: Nacional Records
- Members: Camilo Lara
- Website: institutomexicanodelsonido.tv

Mexican Institute of Sound (MIS; Spanish: Instituto Mexicano del Sonido — IMS) is an electronic music project created by Mexico City-based DJ and producer Camilo Lara. Along with groups like Nortec Collective and Kinky, M.I.S. is part of a growing Mexican electronica movement, encouraging fusions of folk and more traditional music with modern sounds.

== Career ==
Lara's annual Christmas compilation of the year's best tracks and early Mexican Institute of Sound songs became a collector's item in a niche market. This hobby led Lara to collaborate on remixes under the moniker of Mexican Institute of Sound for bands and friends such as Placebo, Le Hammond Inferno, Gecko Turner and Babasónicos. In 2005, he officially founded the M.I.S. project, relying on classic Mexican music samples ranging from the 1920s to the 1960s mixed with Esquivel vocal samples and modern scratches/beats. M.I.S. has 5 albums. Mejico Maxico, Piñata, Soy Sauce, Politico and Disco Popular. 3 EP's Extra Extra Extra!, Suave Patria, IMS vs Sant.

In 2006, Mexican Institute of Sound released its debut album, Méjico Máxico, on Nacional Records. It is a pastiche of electronica, dub, cha-cha-cha, cumbia and spoken word. The album helped M.I.S. garner critical acclaim in publications like Spin, the New York Times, and URB, as well as radio support from such tastemakers as KCRW (Los Angeles), Indie 103 (Los Angeles), KEXP (Seattle), and KUT (Austin).

Mexican Institute of Sound released its second album, Piñata, in 2007. The disc continued the vision established by the debut as a collage of musical influences that reflect Lara's impression of life in the sprawling metropolis of Mexico City. Special guests include members of Tom Tom Club, Fantastic Plastic Machine, and Babasónicos.

Songs from M.I.S. releases have been featured in ABC's Ugly Betty, Showtime's Californication, New Line Cinema's Pride and Glory, a Dos Equis national advertising campaign, and video games such as EA Games FIFA 08, which features El Microfono, and Xbox Games Studios' Forza Horizon 5, which features Vamos. In Australia, "Escríbeme Pronto" was featured in a 2009 ice-cream advertisement.

In 2010, MIS released the song "Suave Patria" for the parade for the Bicentennial of Independence of Mexico; the homonymous EP contains six tracks. Camilo created this music in an attempt to evoke some passages of the Mexican Constitution and represent a soundscape Homeland. Their song "Alocatel" was featured in EA Sports' FIFA 10. Their video for their song "Katia, Tania, Paulina y la Kim" from Piñata has been featured on Link TV.

In 2012, they released their fourth studio album, Politico, which contained songs that relate, as the album title implies, to a political environment. "Es-Toy" was one of its most successful singles. In 2013, MIS appeared in the 2013 video game Grand Theft Auto V, alongside Don Cheto, with the song "Es Toy" appearing in the fictional radio station East Los FM. In 2014 Camilo Lara recorded his fifth studio album, with Toy Selectah. With Red Bull's help, they are recording in Jamaica, the US (New York and Los Angeles), London, and Brazil. The disc had many collaborators, including Ana Bárbara (Latin Grammy Mexican singer-songwriter), Sly and Robbie, Toots Maytals, Gogol Bordello (Eugene), Nina Sky, Money Mark, MC Lyte, N.A.S.A., Kool AD (Das Racist), Kut Masta, Kurt Chrome Sparks, Eric Bobo (Cypress Hill), Tanto Blacks, Chedda Helado, Negro Kita, Kaine Notch, Maluca Mala, Benjamin Lozinger (Mø), DJ Lengua, Matty Rico, Tiombe Lockhart, Angela Hunte, Mela Murder, Los Master Plus, Centavrvs, Sergio Mendoza J. (Los Planetas), Carlos Ann, Ohmega Watts, DJ Dusty, Stro Elliot Pharo (The Leftovers), Dezzie Gee (The Leftovers), Speakz, Nic Haircourt, and Pilar (Los Abandoned). In 2015 Camilo released his fifth album, 'Compass' alongside Toy Selectah.

After four years with no new material, MIS released their single "Mi T-Shirt De La NASA" in advance of the fifth studio album by MIS. 'Disco Popular' was released on Nov 3rd, 2017. Recorded in Jamaica, Mexico and the US, it contains appearances from: La Yegros, Calexico & Orkesta Mendoza, Press Kay, Lorna, Toots Hibbert, Sly & Robbie, Pamputae & Ranco and Adan Jodorowsky. That same year, Lara was brought on as a creative consultant to the animated film Coco. He helped director Lee Unkrich "navigate all the different rhythms from Mexico…to understand the geography of the music." He also helped arranged and produce many of the songs of the film and assisted composer Michael Giacchino. Under MIS, Lara provided the song "Jálale" to the film's soundtrack, and makes a cameo as a skeleton DJ in a party scene of the movie.

MIS contributed a cover of the Metallica song "Sad But True", featuring rappers La Perla and Gera MX, to the charity tribute album The Metallica Blacklist, released in September 2021.

Camilo Lara composed the score for the 2023 movie A Million Miles Away, a portrayal of the life and accomplishments of NASA Astronaut José M. Hernández.

In 2025, Lara was announced as one of the remixers for the 2026 FIFA World Cup theme, representing Mexico City.

== Discography ==
- Méjico Máxico (2006)
- Piñata (2007)
- Soy Sauce (2009)
- Politico (2012)
- Disco Popular (2017)
- Distrito Federal (2021)
- La Liberación (Banda Sonora De La Serie Original De Amazon Prime) by Las Áñez and Mexican Institute of Sound (2025)

=== EPs ===
- Extra!Extra!Extra! (2007)
- Suave Patria (2010)
- IMS vs Sant (2015)
