= Meanings of minor-planet names: 89001–90000 =

As minor planet discoveries are confirmed, they are given a permanent number by the IAU's Minor Planet Center (MPC), and the discoverers can then submit names for them, following the IAU's naming conventions. The list below concerns those minor planets in the specified number-range that have received names, and explains the meanings of those names.

Official naming citations of newly named small Solar System bodies are approved and published in a bulletin by IAU's Working Group for Small Bodies Nomenclature (WGSBN). Before May 2021, citations were published in MPC's Minor Planet Circulars for many decades. Recent citations can also be found on the JPL Small-Body Database (SBDB). Until his death in 2016, German astronomer Lutz D. Schmadel compiled these citations into the Dictionary of Minor Planet Names (DMP) and regularly updated the collection.

Based on Paul Herget's The Names of the Minor Planets, Schmadel also researched the unclear origin of numerous asteroids, most of which had been named prior to World War II. This article incorporates text from this source, which is in the public domain: SBDB New namings may only be added to this list below after official publication as the preannouncement of names is condemned. The WGSBN publishes a comprehensive guideline for the naming rules of non-cometary small Solar System bodies.

== 89001–89100 ==
Named minor planet	Provisional	This minor planet was named for...	Ref · Catalog
There are no named minor planets in this number range

== 89101–89200 ==
back to top

Named minor planet	Provisional	This minor planet was named for...	Ref · Catalog
89131 Phildevries	2001 UC_{12}	Phil DeVries (born 1952), an American entomologist who teaches in the Department of Biological Science at the University of New Orleans. Recipient of a MacArthur Fellowship, he published two books on Costa Rica butterflies.	JPL · 89131

== 89201–89300 ==
back to top

Named minor planet	Provisional	This minor planet was named for...	Ref · Catalog
89264 Sewanee	2001 VN_{2}	The University of the South in Sewanee, Tennessee, home institution of the Cordell-Lorenz Observatory	JPL · 89264
89282 Suzieimber	2001 VD_{17}	Suzie Imber (born 1983) is a planetary scientist, an accomplished mountaineer, elite sportswoman, and TV personality. She is a direct and powerful inspiration for the next generation through her extensive STEM outreach activities, presenting to many thousands of school children about space exploration.	JPL · 89282

== 89301–89400 ==
back to top

Named minor planet	Provisional	This minor planet was named for...	Ref · Catalog
There are no named minor planets in this number range

== 89401–89500 ==
back to top

Named minor planet	Provisional	This minor planet was named for...	Ref · Catalog
89455 Metzendorf	2001 XJ_{1}	Wilhelm Metzendorf (1911–1988) was mayor of the district town of Heppenheim in Germany from 1954 to 1973 and was instrumental in the construction of the Starkenburg Observatory.	IAU · 89455

== 89501–89600 ==
back to top

Named minor planet	Provisional	This minor planet was named for...	Ref · Catalog
There are no named minor planets in this number range

== 89601–89700 ==
back to top

Named minor planet	Provisional	This minor planet was named for...	Ref · Catalog
89664 Pignata	2001 YU_{5}	Giuliano Pignata (born 1972), an Italian astronomer and a member of the Asiago-DLR Asteroid Survey (ADAS), contributes in a decisive way to the calibration and adaptation of the CCD detector to the telescope. His main research interest is now supernovae, but he still searches for minor planets in supernova survey images.	JPL · 89664

== 89701–89800 ==
back to top

Named minor planet	Provisional	This minor planet was named for...	Ref · Catalog
89734 Orsoperuzzi	2002 AH	Orso Peruzzi (born 1993), Italian amateur astronomer.	JPL · 89734
89735 Tommei	2002 AM	Giacomo Tommei (born 1978), Italian mathematician who carried out research at the University of Pisa on the impact monitoring of near-Earth objects. His research interests in celestial mechanics include the orbit determination and dynamics of NEOs.	JPL · 89735
89739 Rampazzi	2002 AL_{7}	Francesca Rampazzi (born 1945), an Italian communications specialist, is responsible for communication and editing for the National Telescope Galileo. She is active in the project to digitize the photographic archives of the Asiago Astrophysical Observatory and instrumental in maintaining the Asiago Astrophysical Observatory's ADAS archive.	JPL · 89739

== 89801–89900 ==
back to top

Named minor planet	Provisional	This minor planet was named for...	Ref · Catalog
89818 Jureskvarč	2002 AX_{203}	Jure Skvarč (born 1964), Slovenian software engineer and a discoverer of minor planets, who created the data-analysis software for the minor planet and comet search project at the Črni Vrh Observatory and in the Astrovirtel survey of the University of Padua.	JPL · 89818

== 89901–90000 ==
back to top

Named minor planet	Provisional	This minor planet was named for...	Ref · Catalog
89903 Post	2002 DL_{3}	Cecil Post (1917–2013), an American amateur astronomer and former engineer in the antenna section of the physical sciences laboratory in Las Cruces, New Mexico. He was an early and active member of the Astronomical Society of Las Cruces and was a frequent officer, including president, of that organization (Src).	JPL · 89903
89909 Linie	2002 ET_{2}	Linie, avant-garde association of artists active in České Budějovice, Czech Republic, 1931–1939	JPL · 89909
89956 Leibacher	2002 LJ_{5}	John Leibacher (born 1941), an American solar astronomer. He is the principal investigator of the Global Oscillation Network Group (GONG) project that studies the physics of the solar interior at six locations around the world. Leibacher is also a former director of the National Solar Observatory.	JPL · 89956
89973 Aranyjános	2002 RR_{117}	János Arany (1817–1882), a Hungarian writer, poet, journalist and translator, who 0 wrote more than 40 ballads (translated into over 50 languages), as well as the Toldi trilogy, to mention his most famous works. He is considered to be the most literary Hungarian writer	JPL · 89973

back to top

Preceded by 88,001–89,000	Meanings of minor-planet names List of minor planets: 89,001–90,000	Succeeded by 90,001–91,000
