= List of minor planets: 89001–90000 =

The following is a partial list of minor planets, running from minor-planet number 89001 through 90000, inclusive. The primary data for this and other partial lists is based on JPL's "Small-Body Orbital Elements" and data available from the Minor Planet Center. Critical list information is also provided by the MPC, unless otherwise specified from Lowell Observatory. A detailed description of the table's columns and additional sources are given on the main page including a complete list of every page in this series, and a statistical break-up on the dynamical classification of minor planets.

Also see the summary list of all named bodies in numerical and alphabetical order, and the corresponding naming citations for the number range of this particular list. New namings may only be added to this list after official publication, as the preannouncement of names is condemned by the Working Group for Small Bodies Nomenclature of the International Astronomical Union.

Near-Earth obj.	MBA (inner)	MBA (outer)	Centaur
Mars-crosser	MBA (middle)	Jupiter trojan	Trans-Neptunian obj.
Unclassified

== 89001–89100 ==
Designation			Discovery			Properties		Ref
Permanent	Provisional	Named after	Date	Site	Discoverer(s)	Category	Diam.	Ref
89001	2001 TH_{78}	—	October 13, 2001	Socorro	LINEAR	·	4.2 km	MPC · JPL
89002	2001 TK_{78}	—	October 13, 2001	Socorro	LINEAR	·	7.3 km	MPC · JPL
89003	2001 TR_{78}	—	October 13, 2001	Socorro	LINEAR	·	3.7 km	MPC · JPL
89004	2001 TE_{79}	—	October 13, 2001	Socorro	LINEAR	·	3.0 km	MPC · JPL
89005	2001 TH_{79}	—	October 13, 2001	Socorro	LINEAR	·	1.6 km	MPC · JPL
89006	2001 TT_{79}	—	October 13, 2001	Socorro	LINEAR	NYS ·	3.9 km	MPC · JPL
89007	2001 TY_{79}	—	October 13, 2001	Socorro	LINEAR	·	4.4 km	MPC · JPL
89008	2001 TA_{80}	—	October 13, 2001	Socorro	LINEAR	·	1.5 km	MPC · JPL
89009	2001 TC_{80}	—	October 13, 2001	Socorro	LINEAR	·	4.2 km	MPC · JPL
89010	2001 TT_{80}	—	October 13, 2001	Socorro	LINEAR	·	3.7 km	MPC · JPL
89011	2001 TY_{80}	—	October 14, 2001	Socorro	LINEAR	·	5.1 km	MPC · JPL
89012	2001 TU_{82}	—	October 14, 2001	Socorro	LINEAR	·	4.0 km	MPC · JPL
89013	2001 TD_{83}	—	October 14, 2001	Socorro	LINEAR	·	1.4 km	MPC · JPL
89014	2001 TE_{83}	—	October 14, 2001	Socorro	LINEAR	·	2.4 km	MPC · JPL
89015	2001 TW_{85}	—	October 14, 2001	Socorro	LINEAR	EOS	3.4 km	MPC · JPL
89016	2001 TW_{87}	—	October 14, 2001	Socorro	LINEAR	·	2.0 km	MPC · JPL
89017	2001 TT_{88}	—	October 14, 2001	Socorro	LINEAR	·	1.1 km	MPC · JPL
89018	2001 TQ_{89}	—	October 14, 2001	Socorro	LINEAR	·	1.7 km	MPC · JPL
89019	2001 TC_{90}	—	October 14, 2001	Socorro	LINEAR	·	4.6 km	MPC · JPL
89020	2001 TK_{91}	—	October 14, 2001	Socorro	LINEAR	·	1.8 km	MPC · JPL
89021	2001 TC_{94}	—	October 14, 2001	Socorro	LINEAR	·	5.8 km	MPC · JPL
89022	2001 TX_{94}	—	October 14, 2001	Socorro	LINEAR	HOF	5.0 km	MPC · JPL
89023	2001 TB_{98}	—	October 14, 2001	Socorro	LINEAR	·	2.1 km	MPC · JPL
89024	2001 TP_{99}	—	October 14, 2001	Socorro	LINEAR	·	6.3 km	MPC · JPL
89025	2001 TD_{101}	—	October 14, 2001	Socorro	LINEAR	·	1.9 km	MPC · JPL
89026	2001 TZ_{101}	—	October 15, 2001	Socorro	LINEAR	·	3.9 km	MPC · JPL
89027	2001 TN_{102}	—	October 15, 2001	Socorro	LINEAR	·	9.8 km	MPC · JPL
89028	2001 TB_{105}	—	October 13, 2001	Socorro	LINEAR	(12739)	4.0 km	MPC · JPL
89029	2001 TK_{105}	—	October 13, 2001	Socorro	LINEAR	·	1.5 km	MPC · JPL
89030	2001 TQ_{105}	—	October 13, 2001	Socorro	LINEAR	V	1.7 km	MPC · JPL
89031	2001 TF_{106}	—	October 13, 2001	Socorro	LINEAR	·	3.3 km	MPC · JPL
89032	2001 TH_{106}	—	October 13, 2001	Socorro	LINEAR	·	2.4 km	MPC · JPL
89033	2001 TO_{106}	—	October 13, 2001	Socorro	LINEAR	·	2.4 km	MPC · JPL
89034	2001 TZ_{106}	—	October 13, 2001	Socorro	LINEAR	·	2.6 km	MPC · JPL
89035	2001 TM_{107}	—	October 13, 2001	Socorro	LINEAR	(5)	3.6 km	MPC · JPL
89036	2001 TV_{107}	—	October 13, 2001	Socorro	LINEAR	(5)	2.2 km	MPC · JPL
89037	2001 TZ_{107}	—	October 13, 2001	Socorro	LINEAR	·	2.8 km	MPC · JPL
89038	2001 TL_{109}	—	October 14, 2001	Socorro	LINEAR	EOS · slow	3.9 km	MPC · JPL
89039	2001 TN_{109}	—	October 14, 2001	Socorro	LINEAR	WIT	2.4 km	MPC · JPL
89040	2001 TS_{109}	—	October 14, 2001	Socorro	LINEAR	·	2.4 km	MPC · JPL
89041	2001 TU_{111}	—	October 14, 2001	Socorro	LINEAR	·	6.1 km	MPC · JPL
89042	2001 TG_{112}	—	October 14, 2001	Socorro	LINEAR	·	2.2 km	MPC · JPL
89043	2001 TJ_{112}	—	October 14, 2001	Socorro	LINEAR	·	1.7 km	MPC · JPL
89044	2001 TG_{113}	—	October 14, 2001	Socorro	LINEAR	·	3.7 km	MPC · JPL
89045	2001 TP_{114}	—	October 14, 2001	Socorro	LINEAR	·	1.9 km	MPC · JPL
89046	2001 TK_{115}	—	October 14, 2001	Socorro	LINEAR	·	1.8 km	MPC · JPL
89047	2001 TT_{115}	—	October 14, 2001	Socorro	LINEAR	EOS	4.2 km	MPC · JPL
89048	2001 TF_{116}	—	October 14, 2001	Socorro	LINEAR	·	4.9 km	MPC · JPL
89049	2001 TA_{117}	—	October 14, 2001	Socorro	LINEAR	V	1.9 km	MPC · JPL
89050	2001 TM_{117}	—	October 14, 2001	Socorro	LINEAR	·	7.7 km	MPC · JPL
89051	2001 TF_{118}	—	October 15, 2001	Socorro	LINEAR	(194)	3.3 km	MPC · JPL
89052	2001 TR_{118}	—	October 15, 2001	Socorro	LINEAR	EUN	3.6 km	MPC · JPL
89053	2001 TQ_{122}	—	October 15, 2001	Socorro	LINEAR	EUN	3.0 km	MPC · JPL
89054	2001 TR_{122}	—	October 15, 2001	Socorro	LINEAR	·	1.3 km	MPC · JPL
89055	2001 TT_{123}	—	October 12, 2001	Haleakala	NEAT	·	1.9 km	MPC · JPL
89056	2001 TK_{125}	—	October 12, 2001	Haleakala	NEAT	·	1.7 km	MPC · JPL
89057	2001 TK_{127}	—	October 12, 2001	Bergisch Gladbach	W. Bickel	·	2.7 km	MPC · JPL
89058	2001 TP_{130}	—	October 8, 2001	Palomar	NEAT	·	4.4 km	MPC · JPL
89059	2001 TR_{130}	—	October 10, 2001	Palomar	NEAT	·	3.3 km	MPC · JPL
89060	2001 TG_{133}	—	October 12, 2001	Haleakala	NEAT	slow	3.8 km	MPC · JPL
89061	2001 TU_{134}	—	October 13, 2001	Palomar	NEAT	fast	4.2 km	MPC · JPL
89062	2001 TW_{134}	—	October 13, 2001	Palomar	NEAT	slow	5.1 km	MPC · JPL
89063	2001 TV_{146}	—	October 10, 2001	Palomar	NEAT	ADE	6.7 km	MPC · JPL
89064	2001 TX_{146}	—	October 10, 2001	Palomar	NEAT	V	1.4 km	MPC · JPL
89065	2001 TK_{147}	—	October 10, 2001	Palomar	NEAT	·	1.1 km	MPC · JPL
89066	2001 TZ_{147}	—	October 10, 2001	Palomar	NEAT	NEM	3.9 km	MPC · JPL
89067	2001 TE_{148}	—	October 10, 2001	Palomar	NEAT	PAD	3.8 km	MPC · JPL
89068	2001 TQ_{148}	—	October 10, 2001	Palomar	NEAT	·	2.6 km	MPC · JPL
89069	2001 TG_{149}	—	October 10, 2001	Palomar	NEAT	·	3.8 km	MPC · JPL
89070	2001 TV_{149}	—	October 10, 2001	Palomar	NEAT	·	2.5 km	MPC · JPL
89071	2001 TF_{150}	—	October 10, 2001	Palomar	NEAT	·	2.8 km	MPC · JPL
89072	2001 TS_{151}	—	October 10, 2001	Palomar	NEAT	·	5.8 km	MPC · JPL
89073	2001 TC_{153}	—	October 10, 2001	Palomar	NEAT	·	2.1 km	MPC · JPL
89074	2001 TD_{154}	—	October 15, 2001	Palomar	NEAT	·	2.6 km	MPC · JPL
89075	2001 TG_{158}	—	October 10, 2001	Palomar	NEAT	·	1.5 km	MPC · JPL
89076	2001 TH_{158}	—	October 10, 2001	Palomar	NEAT	·	4.5 km	MPC · JPL
89077	2001 TU_{159}	—	October 12, 2001	Haleakala	NEAT	BRA	2.8 km	MPC · JPL
89078	2001 TC_{162}	—	October 11, 2001	Palomar	NEAT	·	1.9 km	MPC · JPL
89079	2001 TQ_{165}	—	October 14, 2001	Socorro	LINEAR	·	5.3 km	MPC · JPL
89080	2001 TA_{166}	—	October 14, 2001	Socorro	LINEAR	(2076)	2.9 km	MPC · JPL
89081	2001 TE_{166}	—	October 14, 2001	Socorro	LINEAR	·	2.5 km	MPC · JPL
89082	2001 TB_{167}	—	October 15, 2001	Socorro	LINEAR	PHO	2.2 km	MPC · JPL
89083	2001 TA_{170}	—	October 15, 2001	Socorro	LINEAR	·	1.6 km	MPC · JPL
89084	2001 TQ_{171}	—	October 15, 2001	Palomar	NEAT	·	2.3 km	MPC · JPL
89085	2001 TU_{171}	—	October 13, 2001	Anderson Mesa	LONEOS	·	3.6 km	MPC · JPL
89086	2001 TG_{172}	—	October 13, 2001	Socorro	LINEAR	HOF	4.7 km	MPC · JPL
89087	2001 TS_{174}	—	October 15, 2001	Socorro	LINEAR	·	7.6 km	MPC · JPL
89088	2001 TY_{181}	—	October 14, 2001	Socorro	LINEAR	·	2.8 km	MPC · JPL
89089	2001 TF_{182}	—	October 14, 2001	Socorro	LINEAR	V	1.4 km	MPC · JPL
89090	2001 TK_{182}	—	October 14, 2001	Socorro	LINEAR	·	1.4 km	MPC · JPL
89091	2001 TS_{187}	—	October 14, 2001	Socorro	LINEAR	·	3.6 km	MPC · JPL
89092	2001 TY_{188}	—	October 14, 2001	Socorro	LINEAR	·	1.2 km	MPC · JPL
89093	2001 TA_{189}	—	October 14, 2001	Socorro	LINEAR	·	1.9 km	MPC · JPL
89094	2001 TN_{189}	—	October 14, 2001	Socorro	LINEAR	·	2.0 km	MPC · JPL
89095	2001 TU_{189}	—	October 14, 2001	Socorro	LINEAR	V	1.6 km	MPC · JPL
89096	2001 TB_{190}	—	October 14, 2001	Socorro	LINEAR	·	2.8 km	MPC · JPL
89097	2001 TS_{190}	—	October 14, 2001	Socorro	LINEAR	·	2.1 km	MPC · JPL
89098	2001 TM_{192}	—	October 14, 2001	Socorro	LINEAR	V	2.0 km	MPC · JPL
89099	2001 TF_{193}	—	October 14, 2001	Socorro	LINEAR	·	2.7 km	MPC · JPL
89100	2001 TN_{194}	—	October 15, 2001	Socorro	LINEAR	·	2.4 km	MPC · JPL

== 89101–89200 ==
back to top

Designation			Discovery			Properties		Ref
Permanent	Provisional	Named after	Date	Site	Discoverer(s)	Category	Diam.	Ref
89101	2001 TF_{199}	—	October 11, 2001	Socorro	LINEAR	·	1.9 km	MPC · JPL
89102	2001 TS_{199}	—	October 11, 2001	Socorro	LINEAR	·	2.8 km	MPC · JPL
89103	2001 TN_{202}	—	October 11, 2001	Socorro	LINEAR	·	2.7 km	MPC · JPL
89104	2001 TT_{202}	—	October 11, 2001	Socorro	LINEAR	EOS	3.9 km	MPC · JPL
89105	2001 TZ_{205}	—	October 11, 2001	Socorro	LINEAR	MAR	2.9 km	MPC · JPL
89106	2001 TB_{206}	—	October 11, 2001	Socorro	LINEAR	·	2.0 km	MPC · JPL
89107	2001 TR_{206}	—	October 11, 2001	Socorro	LINEAR	·	7.3 km	MPC · JPL
89108	2001 TE_{208}	—	October 11, 2001	Palomar	NEAT	THM	4.9 km	MPC · JPL
89109	2001 TM_{210}	—	October 13, 2001	Anderson Mesa	LONEOS	·	3.6 km	MPC · JPL
89110	2001 TW_{210}	—	October 13, 2001	Palomar	NEAT	·	5.7 km	MPC · JPL
89111	2001 TO_{211}	—	October 13, 2001	Palomar	NEAT	MAR	2.2 km	MPC · JPL
89112	2001 TW_{211}	—	October 13, 2001	Socorro	LINEAR	·	2.5 km	MPC · JPL
89113	2001 TC_{214}	—	October 13, 2001	Anderson Mesa	LONEOS	·	2.1 km	MPC · JPL
89114	2001 TJ_{218}	—	October 14, 2001	Anderson Mesa	LONEOS	·	2.9 km	MPC · JPL
89115	2001 TQ_{220}	—	October 14, 2001	Socorro	LINEAR	·	2.9 km	MPC · JPL
89116	2001 TC_{222}	—	October 14, 2001	Socorro	LINEAR	·	1.8 km	MPC · JPL
89117	2001 TK_{222}	—	October 14, 2001	Socorro	LINEAR	EUN	2.6 km	MPC · JPL
89118	2001 TT_{227}	—	October 15, 2001	Palomar	NEAT	·	3.5 km	MPC · JPL
89119	2001 TD_{231}	—	October 15, 2001	Palomar	NEAT	·	4.0 km	MPC · JPL
89120	2001 TX_{235}	—	October 15, 2001	Palomar	NEAT	·	3.4 km	MPC · JPL
89121	2001 TU_{238}	—	October 15, 2001	Palomar	NEAT	·	2.7 km	MPC · JPL
89122	2001 UN_{2}	—	October 18, 2001	Desert Eagle	W. K. Y. Yeung	·	2.5 km	MPC · JPL
89123	2001 US_{2}	—	October 18, 2001	Desert Eagle	W. K. Y. Yeung	V	1.3 km	MPC · JPL
89124	2001 UC_{3}	—	October 16, 2001	Socorro	LINEAR	EMA	5.7 km	MPC · JPL
89125	2001 UK_{3}	—	October 16, 2001	Socorro	LINEAR	·	3.7 km	MPC · JPL
89126	2001 UV_{3}	—	October 17, 2001	Desert Eagle	W. K. Y. Yeung	·	2.7 km	MPC · JPL
89127	2001 UX_{3}	—	October 17, 2001	Desert Eagle	W. K. Y. Yeung	·	3.5 km	MPC · JPL
89128	2001 UP_{7}	—	October 17, 2001	Socorro	LINEAR	EUN	3.1 km	MPC · JPL
89129	2001 UH_{9}	—	October 17, 2001	Socorro	LINEAR	·	2.4 km	MPC · JPL
89130	2001 UJ_{10}	—	October 20, 2001	Powell	Powell	·	6.7 km	MPC · JPL
89131 Phildevries	2001 UC_{12}	Phildevries	October 23, 2001	Desert Eagle	W. K. Y. Yeung	·	3.3 km	MPC · JPL
89132	2001 UU_{13}	—	October 24, 2001	Desert Eagle	W. K. Y. Yeung	·	2.7 km	MPC · JPL
89133	2001 UV_{13}	—	October 24, 2001	Desert Eagle	W. K. Y. Yeung	·	2.8 km	MPC · JPL
89134	2001 UW_{15}	—	October 25, 2001	Desert Eagle	W. K. Y. Yeung	·	3.3 km	MPC · JPL
89135	2001 UB_{16}	—	October 25, 2001	Desert Eagle	W. K. Y. Yeung	CLA	5.1 km	MPC · JPL
89136	2001 US_{16}	—	October 23, 2001	Kitt Peak	Spacewatch	AMO · APO · PHA	310 m	MPC · JPL
89137	2001 UD_{17}	—	October 17, 2001	Socorro	LINEAR	·	1.5 km	MPC · JPL
89138	2001 UU_{19}	—	October 17, 2001	Kitt Peak	Spacewatch	THM	4.2 km	MPC · JPL
89139	2001 UT_{20}	—	October 18, 2001	Palomar	NEAT	·	1.3 km	MPC · JPL
89140	2001 UT_{21}	—	October 17, 2001	Socorro	LINEAR	EUN	3.2 km	MPC · JPL
89141	2001 UC_{25}	—	October 18, 2001	Socorro	LINEAR	·	6.2 km	MPC · JPL
89142	2001 UP_{26}	—	October 18, 2001	Socorro	LINEAR	·	3.3 km	MPC · JPL
89143	2001 UL_{30}	—	October 16, 2001	Socorro	LINEAR	·	2.5 km	MPC · JPL
89144	2001 UL_{32}	—	October 16, 2001	Socorro	LINEAR	·	3.3 km	MPC · JPL
89145	2001 UH_{33}	—	October 16, 2001	Socorro	LINEAR	BAP · slow	1.9 km	MPC · JPL
89146	2001 UO_{33}	—	October 16, 2001	Socorro	LINEAR	·	4.3 km	MPC · JPL
89147	2001 UQ_{33}	—	October 16, 2001	Socorro	LINEAR	·	2.7 km	MPC · JPL
89148	2001 US_{33}	—	October 16, 2001	Socorro	LINEAR	·	5.4 km	MPC · JPL
89149	2001 UD_{34}	—	October 16, 2001	Socorro	LINEAR	V	1.5 km	MPC · JPL
89150	2001 UF_{34}	—	October 16, 2001	Socorro	LINEAR	·	3.5 km	MPC · JPL
89151	2001 UF_{35}	—	October 16, 2001	Socorro	LINEAR	V	1.4 km	MPC · JPL
89152	2001 UW_{36}	—	October 16, 2001	Socorro	LINEAR	·	3.4 km	MPC · JPL
89153	2001 UF_{38}	—	October 17, 2001	Socorro	LINEAR	NYS	1.9 km	MPC · JPL
89154	2001 UO_{38}	—	October 17, 2001	Socorro	LINEAR	AST	3.9 km	MPC · JPL
89155	2001 UE_{39}	—	October 17, 2001	Socorro	LINEAR	WIT	1.8 km	MPC · JPL
89156	2001 UA_{43}	—	October 17, 2001	Socorro	LINEAR	·	2.6 km	MPC · JPL
89157	2001 UW_{43}	—	October 17, 2001	Socorro	LINEAR	·	1.5 km	MPC · JPL
89158	2001 UE_{44}	—	October 17, 2001	Socorro	LINEAR	·	1.5 km	MPC · JPL
89159	2001 UJ_{44}	—	October 17, 2001	Socorro	LINEAR	·	3.7 km	MPC · JPL
89160	2001 UD_{48}	—	October 17, 2001	Socorro	LINEAR	·	1.5 km	MPC · JPL
89161	2001 UL_{48}	—	October 17, 2001	Socorro	LINEAR	·	2.5 km	MPC · JPL
89162	2001 UA_{49}	—	October 17, 2001	Socorro	LINEAR	KOR · fast	2.9 km	MPC · JPL
89163	2001 UJ_{49}	—	October 17, 2001	Socorro	LINEAR	·	3.6 km	MPC · JPL
89164	2001 UX_{49}	—	October 17, 2001	Socorro	LINEAR	EOS	4.1 km	MPC · JPL
89165	2001 UZ_{49}	—	October 17, 2001	Socorro	LINEAR	·	1.9 km	MPC · JPL
89166	2001 UE_{50}	—	October 17, 2001	Socorro	LINEAR	MAR	2.9 km	MPC · JPL
89167	2001 UF_{50}	—	October 17, 2001	Socorro	LINEAR	·	7.3 km	MPC · JPL
89168	2001 UL_{50}	—	October 17, 2001	Socorro	LINEAR	V	1.3 km	MPC · JPL
89169	2001 UR_{52}	—	October 17, 2001	Socorro	LINEAR	·	2.5 km	MPC · JPL
89170	2001 UR_{53}	—	October 17, 2001	Socorro	LINEAR	·	3.5 km	MPC · JPL
89171	2001 UZ_{54}	—	October 16, 2001	Socorro	LINEAR	AGN	2.4 km	MPC · JPL
89172	2001 UE_{55}	—	October 16, 2001	Socorro	LINEAR	·	3.3 km	MPC · JPL
89173	2001 UK_{55}	—	October 17, 2001	Socorro	LINEAR	TIR	7.3 km	MPC · JPL
89174	2001 UO_{55}	—	October 17, 2001	Socorro	LINEAR	·	2.1 km	MPC · JPL
89175	2001 UM_{57}	—	October 17, 2001	Socorro	LINEAR	CYB	4.3 km	MPC · JPL
89176	2001 UP_{59}	—	October 17, 2001	Socorro	LINEAR	·	1.6 km	MPC · JPL
89177	2001 UQ_{62}	—	October 17, 2001	Socorro	LINEAR	NYS	3.6 km	MPC · JPL
89178	2001 UC_{64}	—	October 18, 2001	Socorro	LINEAR	·	2.9 km	MPC · JPL
89179	2001 UV_{64}	—	October 18, 2001	Socorro	LINEAR	·	2.8 km	MPC · JPL
89180	2001 UO_{65}	—	October 18, 2001	Socorro	LINEAR	·	4.7 km	MPC · JPL
89181	2001 UT_{65}	—	October 18, 2001	Socorro	LINEAR	·	1.4 km	MPC · JPL
89182	2001 UQ_{68}	—	October 20, 2001	Socorro	LINEAR	EOS · slow	5.3 km	MPC · JPL
89183	2001 UD_{70}	—	October 17, 2001	Kitt Peak	Spacewatch	·	2.8 km	MPC · JPL
89184	2001 UU_{73}	—	October 17, 2001	Socorro	LINEAR	·	2.1 km	MPC · JPL
89185	2001 UY_{73}	—	October 17, 2001	Socorro	LINEAR	HOF	5.4 km	MPC · JPL
89186	2001 UA_{75}	—	October 17, 2001	Socorro	LINEAR	KOR	2.6 km	MPC · JPL
89187	2001 UD_{75}	—	October 17, 2001	Socorro	LINEAR	·	1.5 km	MPC · JPL
89188	2001 UT_{75}	—	October 17, 2001	Socorro	LINEAR	·	1.4 km	MPC · JPL
89189	2001 UU_{75}	—	October 17, 2001	Socorro	LINEAR	·	2.6 km	MPC · JPL
89190	2001 UG_{76}	—	October 17, 2001	Socorro	LINEAR	·	2.2 km	MPC · JPL
89191	2001 UH_{77}	—	October 17, 2001	Socorro	LINEAR	·	4.7 km	MPC · JPL
89192	2001 UJ_{77}	—	October 17, 2001	Socorro	LINEAR	·	2.3 km	MPC · JPL
89193	2001 UW_{77}	—	October 18, 2001	Socorro	LINEAR	·	4.6 km	MPC · JPL
89194	2001 UZ_{77}	—	October 20, 2001	Socorro	LINEAR	·	2.8 km	MPC · JPL
89195	2001 UO_{78}	—	October 20, 2001	Socorro	LINEAR	slow	1.3 km	MPC · JPL
89196	2001 UH_{79}	—	October 20, 2001	Socorro	LINEAR	EOS	2.9 km	MPC · JPL
89197	2001 UN_{82}	—	October 20, 2001	Socorro	LINEAR	KOR	2.7 km	MPC · JPL
89198	2001 UQ_{83}	—	October 20, 2001	Socorro	LINEAR	·	3.4 km	MPC · JPL
89199	2001 UW_{83}	—	October 20, 2001	Socorro	LINEAR	·	2.0 km	MPC · JPL
89200	2001 UH_{84}	—	October 21, 2001	Socorro	LINEAR	·	2.1 km	MPC · JPL

== 89201–89300 ==
back to top

Designation			Discovery			Properties		Ref
Permanent	Provisional	Named after	Date	Site	Discoverer(s)	Category	Diam.	Ref
89201	2001 UJ_{86}	—	October 16, 2001	Kitt Peak	Spacewatch	NYS	2.6 km	MPC · JPL
89202	2001 UJ_{90}	—	October 21, 2001	Kitt Peak	Spacewatch	·	5.1 km	MPC · JPL
89203	2001 UM_{93}	—	October 19, 2001	Haleakala	NEAT	·	3.8 km	MPC · JPL
89204	2001 UQ_{93}	—	October 19, 2001	Haleakala	NEAT	·	3.4 km	MPC · JPL
89205	2001 UY_{94}	—	October 19, 2001	Haleakala	NEAT	·	2.5 km	MPC · JPL
89206	2001 UC_{98}	—	October 17, 2001	Socorro	LINEAR	·	4.5 km	MPC · JPL
89207	2001 UJ_{99}	—	October 17, 2001	Socorro	LINEAR	·	2.3 km	MPC · JPL
89208	2001 UR_{103}	—	October 20, 2001	Socorro	LINEAR	·	4.5 km	MPC · JPL
89209	2001 UU_{106}	—	October 20, 2001	Socorro	LINEAR	·	5.1 km	MPC · JPL
89210	2001 UH_{108}	—	October 20, 2001	Socorro	LINEAR	KOR	2.3 km	MPC · JPL
89211	2001 UX_{108}	—	October 20, 2001	Socorro	LINEAR	(16286)	3.5 km	MPC · JPL
89212	2001 UD_{109}	—	October 20, 2001	Socorro	LINEAR	·	2.2 km	MPC · JPL
89213	2001 UW_{109}	—	October 20, 2001	Socorro	LINEAR	MRX	2.4 km	MPC · JPL
89214	2001 UL_{111}	—	October 21, 2001	Socorro	LINEAR	·	4.5 km	MPC · JPL
89215	2001 UM_{117}	—	October 22, 2001	Socorro	LINEAR	·	3.8 km	MPC · JPL
89216	2001 UN_{117}	—	October 22, 2001	Socorro	LINEAR	·	2.8 km	MPC · JPL
89217	2001 UM_{119}	—	October 22, 2001	Socorro	LINEAR	THM	6.5 km	MPC · JPL
89218	2001 UP_{119}	—	October 22, 2001	Socorro	LINEAR	NEM	5.0 km	MPC · JPL
89219	2001 UJ_{120}	—	October 22, 2001	Socorro	LINEAR	·	1.8 km	MPC · JPL
89220	2001 UK_{121}	—	October 22, 2001	Socorro	LINEAR	AGN	2.1 km	MPC · JPL
89221	2001 UH_{122}	—	October 22, 2001	Socorro	LINEAR	·	3.3 km	MPC · JPL
89222	2001 UM_{122}	—	October 22, 2001	Socorro	LINEAR	·	2.5 km	MPC · JPL
89223	2001 UE_{123}	—	October 22, 2001	Socorro	LINEAR	·	1.3 km	MPC · JPL
89224	2001 UU_{124}	—	October 22, 2001	Palomar	NEAT	EUN · slow	2.9 km	MPC · JPL
89225	2001 UE_{126}	—	October 23, 2001	Palomar	NEAT	·	4.6 km	MPC · JPL
89226	2001 UH_{127}	—	October 17, 2001	Socorro	LINEAR	·	4.3 km	MPC · JPL
89227	2001 UO_{127}	—	October 17, 2001	Socorro	LINEAR	·	3.9 km	MPC · JPL
89228	2001 UT_{127}	—	October 17, 2001	Socorro	LINEAR	·	5.9 km	MPC · JPL
89229	2001 UY_{127}	—	October 17, 2001	Socorro	LINEAR	·	7.8 km	MPC · JPL
89230	2001 UF_{132}	—	October 20, 2001	Socorro	LINEAR	·	5.8 km	MPC · JPL
89231	2001 UA_{141}	—	October 23, 2001	Socorro	LINEAR	·	4.1 km	MPC · JPL
89232	2001 UP_{141}	—	October 23, 2001	Socorro	LINEAR	NYS	2.8 km	MPC · JPL
89233	2001 UT_{146}	—	October 23, 2001	Socorro	LINEAR	·	3.1 km	MPC · JPL
89234	2001 UZ_{146}	—	October 23, 2001	Socorro	LINEAR	·	2.1 km	MPC · JPL
89235	2001 UU_{148}	—	October 23, 2001	Socorro	LINEAR	KOR	2.4 km	MPC · JPL
89236	2001 UB_{150}	—	October 23, 2001	Socorro	LINEAR	·	2.4 km	MPC · JPL
89237	2001 UD_{152}	—	October 23, 2001	Socorro	LINEAR	(194)	4.9 km	MPC · JPL
89238	2001 UQ_{153}	—	October 23, 2001	Socorro	LINEAR	V · fast	1.5 km	MPC · JPL
89239	2001 UX_{153}	—	October 23, 2001	Socorro	LINEAR	KOR	2.6 km	MPC · JPL
89240	2001 UO_{156}	—	October 23, 2001	Socorro	LINEAR	·	2.2 km	MPC · JPL
89241	2001 UE_{157}	—	October 23, 2001	Socorro	LINEAR	·	5.1 km	MPC · JPL
89242	2001 UP_{157}	—	October 23, 2001	Socorro	LINEAR	·	3.7 km	MPC · JPL
89243	2001 UF_{159}	—	October 23, 2001	Socorro	LINEAR	KOR	2.8 km	MPC · JPL
89244	2001 UY_{164}	—	October 23, 2001	Palomar	NEAT	·	2.7 km	MPC · JPL
89245	2001 UQ_{167}	—	October 19, 2001	Socorro	LINEAR	MAR	3.5 km	MPC · JPL
89246	2001 UU_{167}	—	October 19, 2001	Socorro	LINEAR	·	4.0 km	MPC · JPL
89247	2001 UE_{168}	—	October 19, 2001	Socorro	LINEAR	·	6.4 km	MPC · JPL
89248	2001 UR_{169}	—	October 20, 2001	Socorro	LINEAR	·	3.0 km	MPC · JPL
89249	2001 UA_{171}	—	October 21, 2001	Socorro	LINEAR	NYS	3.0 km	MPC · JPL
89250	2001 UH_{174}	—	October 18, 2001	Palomar	NEAT	·	4.2 km	MPC · JPL
89251	2001 UK_{174}	—	October 18, 2001	Palomar	NEAT	·	2.4 km	MPC · JPL
89252	2001 UT_{177}	—	October 21, 2001	Socorro	LINEAR	·	2.6 km	MPC · JPL
89253	2001 UM_{178}	—	October 23, 2001	Palomar	NEAT	·	3.1 km	MPC · JPL
89254	2001 US_{178}	—	October 23, 2001	Palomar	NEAT	·	6.6 km	MPC · JPL
89255	2001 UN_{179}	—	October 26, 2001	Palomar	NEAT	·	3.9 km	MPC · JPL
89256	2001 UQ_{183}	—	October 16, 2001	Palomar	NEAT	slow	1.6 km	MPC · JPL
89257	2001 UF_{184}	—	October 16, 2001	Kitt Peak	Spacewatch	THM	5.9 km	MPC · JPL
89258	2001 UM_{203}	—	October 19, 2001	Kitt Peak	Spacewatch	·	3.7 km	MPC · JPL
89259	2001 UR_{203}	—	October 19, 2001	Palomar	NEAT	THM	5.5 km	MPC · JPL
89260	2001 UT_{213}	—	October 23, 2001	Anderson Mesa	LONEOS	MAR	2.5 km	MPC · JPL
89261	2001 VO	—	November 7, 2001	Socorro	LINEAR	HNS	3.3 km	MPC · JPL
89262	2001 VV_{1}	—	November 9, 2001	Socorro	LINEAR	·	1.6 km	MPC · JPL
89263	2001 VZ_{1}	—	November 10, 2001	Starkenburg Observatory	Starkenburg	·	2.5 km	MPC · JPL
89264 Sewanee	2001 VN_{2}	Sewanee	November 11, 2001	Cordell-Lorenz	D. T. Durig	·	2.6 km	MPC · JPL
89265	2001 VE_{5}	—	November 8, 2001	Goodricke-Pigott	R. A. Tucker	·	7.0 km	MPC · JPL
89266	2001 VH_{7}	—	November 9, 2001	Socorro	LINEAR	·	7.2 km	MPC · JPL
89267	2001 VP_{8}	—	November 9, 2001	Socorro	LINEAR	·	4.5 km	MPC · JPL
89268	2001 VY_{8}	—	November 9, 2001	Socorro	LINEAR	·	1.7 km	MPC · JPL
89269	2001 VS_{9}	—	November 9, 2001	Socorro	LINEAR	·	1.3 km	MPC · JPL
89270	2001 VB_{10}	—	November 10, 2001	Socorro	LINEAR	·	1.9 km	MPC · JPL
89271	2001 VS_{10}	—	November 10, 2001	Socorro	LINEAR	V	1.3 km	MPC · JPL
89272	2001 VF_{11}	—	November 10, 2001	Socorro	LINEAR	EUN	3.1 km	MPC · JPL
89273	2001 VO_{12}	—	November 10, 2001	Socorro	LINEAR	PHO	4.4 km	MPC · JPL
89274	2001 VZ_{12}	—	November 10, 2001	Socorro	LINEAR	EUN	3.1 km	MPC · JPL
89275	2001 VD_{13}	—	November 10, 2001	Socorro	LINEAR	·	7.9 km	MPC · JPL
89276	2001 VK_{15}	—	November 10, 2001	Socorro	LINEAR	·	3.0 km	MPC · JPL
89277	2001 VZ_{15}	—	November 7, 2001	Palomar	NEAT	HNS	2.9 km	MPC · JPL
89278	2001 VD_{16}	—	November 9, 2001	Palomar	NEAT	·	3.5 km	MPC · JPL
89279	2001 VJ_{16}	—	November 10, 2001	Palomar	NEAT	·	1.6 km	MPC · JPL
89280	2001 VS_{16}	—	November 10, 2001	Socorro	LINEAR	EUN	2.5 km	MPC · JPL
89281	2001 VU_{16}	—	November 10, 2001	Socorro	LINEAR	HNS	3.0 km	MPC · JPL
89282 Suzieimber	2001 VD_{17}	Suzieimber	November 10, 2001	Ondřejov	P. Pravec, P. Kušnirák	(5)	1.9 km	MPC · JPL
89283	2001 VJ_{17}	—	November 11, 2001	Goodricke-Pigott	R. A. Tucker	·	10 km	MPC · JPL
89284	2001 VY_{17}	—	November 9, 2001	Socorro	LINEAR	·	2.0 km	MPC · JPL
89285	2001 VZ_{17}	—	November 9, 2001	Socorro	LINEAR	·	2.9 km	MPC · JPL
89286	2001 VH_{18}	—	November 9, 2001	Socorro	LINEAR	PAD · fast	5.2 km	MPC · JPL
89287	2001 VM_{18}	—	November 9, 2001	Socorro	LINEAR	·	1.5 km	MPC · JPL
89288	2001 VU_{18}	—	November 9, 2001	Socorro	LINEAR	·	2.5 km	MPC · JPL
89289	2001 VY_{21}	—	November 9, 2001	Socorro	LINEAR	KOR	3.5 km	MPC · JPL
89290	2001 VX_{24}	—	November 9, 2001	Socorro	LINEAR	·	1.6 km	MPC · JPL
89291	2001 VM_{26}	—	November 9, 2001	Socorro	LINEAR	·	4.9 km	MPC · JPL
89292	2001 VP_{26}	—	November 9, 2001	Socorro	LINEAR	·	2.7 km	MPC · JPL
89293	2001 VL_{27}	—	November 9, 2001	Socorro	LINEAR	·	4.5 km	MPC · JPL
89294	2001 VP_{27}	—	November 9, 2001	Socorro	LINEAR	·	2.2 km	MPC · JPL
89295	2001 VE_{28}	—	November 9, 2001	Socorro	LINEAR	·	1.4 km	MPC · JPL
89296	2001 VM_{28}	—	November 9, 2001	Socorro	LINEAR	·	3.0 km	MPC · JPL
89297	2001 VQ_{28}	—	November 9, 2001	Socorro	LINEAR	VER	5.6 km	MPC · JPL
89298	2001 VD_{29}	—	November 9, 2001	Socorro	LINEAR	·	4.2 km	MPC · JPL
89299	2001 VM_{29}	—	November 9, 2001	Socorro	LINEAR	·	2.8 km	MPC · JPL
89300	2001 VA_{30}	—	November 9, 2001	Socorro	LINEAR	·	2.6 km	MPC · JPL

== 89301–89400 ==
back to top

Designation			Discovery			Properties		Ref
Permanent	Provisional	Named after	Date	Site	Discoverer(s)	Category	Diam.	Ref
89301	2001 VH_{30}	—	November 9, 2001	Socorro	LINEAR	ADE	5.6 km	MPC · JPL
89302	2001 VR_{31}	—	November 9, 2001	Socorro	LINEAR	V	1.5 km	MPC · JPL
89303	2001 VW_{31}	—	November 9, 2001	Socorro	LINEAR	·	6.4 km	MPC · JPL
89304	2001 VG_{32}	—	November 9, 2001	Socorro	LINEAR	·	2.6 km	MPC · JPL
89305	2001 VR_{32}	—	November 9, 2001	Socorro	LINEAR	·	2.3 km	MPC · JPL
89306	2001 VU_{33}	—	November 9, 2001	Socorro	LINEAR	·	3.3 km	MPC · JPL
89307	2001 VO_{34}	—	November 9, 2001	Socorro	LINEAR	·	4.1 km	MPC · JPL
89308	2001 VU_{34}	—	November 9, 2001	Socorro	LINEAR	EUN	2.8 km	MPC · JPL
89309	2001 VN_{36}	—	November 9, 2001	Socorro	LINEAR	·	1.5 km	MPC · JPL
89310	2001 VU_{36}	—	November 9, 2001	Socorro	LINEAR	HYG	6.4 km	MPC · JPL
89311	2001 VW_{36}	—	November 9, 2001	Socorro	LINEAR	MAS	1.6 km	MPC · JPL
89312	2001 VE_{37}	—	November 9, 2001	Socorro	LINEAR	·	2.7 km	MPC · JPL
89313	2001 VH_{37}	—	November 9, 2001	Socorro	LINEAR	·	2.3 km	MPC · JPL
89314	2001 VF_{40}	—	November 9, 2001	Socorro	LINEAR	·	6.6 km	MPC · JPL
89315	2001 VJ_{40}	—	November 9, 2001	Socorro	LINEAR	·	2.8 km	MPC · JPL
89316	2001 VW_{40}	—	November 9, 2001	Socorro	LINEAR	·	1.8 km	MPC · JPL
89317	2001 VA_{41}	—	November 9, 2001	Socorro	LINEAR	V	1.5 km	MPC · JPL
89318	2001 VE_{42}	—	November 9, 2001	Socorro	LINEAR	DOR	6.7 km	MPC · JPL
89319	2001 VO_{42}	—	November 9, 2001	Socorro	LINEAR	EOS	3.8 km	MPC · JPL
89320	2001 VT_{42}	—	November 9, 2001	Socorro	LINEAR	·	1.6 km	MPC · JPL
89321	2001 VB_{43}	—	November 9, 2001	Socorro	LINEAR	slow	2.1 km	MPC · JPL
89322	2001 VF_{43}	—	November 9, 2001	Socorro	LINEAR	NYS	2.7 km	MPC · JPL
89323	2001 VA_{44}	—	November 9, 2001	Socorro	LINEAR	·	4.9 km	MPC · JPL
89324	2001 VG_{44}	—	November 9, 2001	Socorro	LINEAR	NYS	2.2 km	MPC · JPL
89325	2001 VW_{44}	—	November 9, 2001	Socorro	LINEAR	NYS	3.3 km	MPC · JPL
89326	2001 VP_{45}	—	November 9, 2001	Socorro	LINEAR	·	4.6 km	MPC · JPL
89327	2001 VD_{46}	—	November 9, 2001	Socorro	LINEAR	·	2.9 km	MPC · JPL
89328	2001 VF_{46}	—	November 9, 2001	Socorro	LINEAR	EUN	3.9 km	MPC · JPL
89329	2001 VR_{46}	—	November 9, 2001	Socorro	LINEAR	slow	2.6 km	MPC · JPL
89330	2001 VT_{46}	—	November 9, 2001	Socorro	LINEAR	·	2.3 km	MPC · JPL
89331	2001 VX_{47}	—	November 9, 2001	Socorro	LINEAR	(2076)	2.7 km	MPC · JPL
89332	2001 VT_{48}	—	November 9, 2001	Socorro	LINEAR	·	3.0 km	MPC · JPL
89333	2001 VJ_{51}	—	November 10, 2001	Socorro	LINEAR	·	6.6 km	MPC · JPL
89334	2001 VM_{53}	—	November 10, 2001	Socorro	LINEAR	·	2.8 km	MPC · JPL
89335	2001 VU_{53}	—	November 10, 2001	Socorro	LINEAR	·	2.4 km	MPC · JPL
89336	2001 VZ_{53}	—	November 10, 2001	Socorro	LINEAR	·	3.7 km	MPC · JPL
89337	2001 VJ_{54}	—	November 10, 2001	Socorro	LINEAR	GEF	2.5 km	MPC · JPL
89338	2001 VC_{55}	—	November 10, 2001	Socorro	LINEAR	·	3.6 km	MPC · JPL
89339	2001 VV_{56}	—	November 10, 2001	Socorro	LINEAR	·	4.4 km	MPC · JPL
89340	2001 VT_{57}	—	November 10, 2001	Socorro	LINEAR	EOS	3.1 km	MPC · JPL
89341	2001 VM_{58}	—	November 10, 2001	Socorro	LINEAR	MRX	2.4 km	MPC · JPL
89342	2001 VX_{58}	—	November 10, 2001	Socorro	LINEAR	·	3.7 km	MPC · JPL
89343	2001 VX_{62}	—	November 10, 2001	Socorro	LINEAR	·	3.1 km	MPC · JPL
89344	2001 VY_{63}	—	November 10, 2001	Socorro	LINEAR	V	1.2 km	MPC · JPL
89345	2001 VY_{65}	—	November 10, 2001	Socorro	LINEAR	·	1.8 km	MPC · JPL
89346	2001 VH_{66}	—	November 10, 2001	Socorro	LINEAR	·	1.6 km	MPC · JPL
89347	2001 VS_{66}	—	November 10, 2001	Socorro	LINEAR	EUN	3.2 km	MPC · JPL
89348	2001 VB_{67}	—	November 10, 2001	Socorro	LINEAR	·	7.2 km	MPC · JPL
89349	2001 VB_{71}	—	November 11, 2001	Socorro	LINEAR	·	6.6 km	MPC · JPL
89350	2001 VM_{71}	—	November 11, 2001	Ondřejov	P. Kušnirák, P. Pravec	·	2.2 km	MPC · JPL
89351	2001 VB_{75}	—	November 8, 2001	Palomar	NEAT	·	2.6 km	MPC · JPL
89352	2001 VC_{75}	—	November 8, 2001	Palomar	NEAT	DOR	7.9 km	MPC · JPL
89353	2001 VN_{75}	—	November 14, 2001	Kitt Peak	Spacewatch	·	3.1 km	MPC · JPL
89354	2001 VL_{76}	—	November 14, 2001	Bisei SG Center	BATTeRS	·	4.5 km	MPC · JPL
89355	2001 VS_{78}	—	November 15, 2001	Anderson Mesa	LONEOS	AMO +1km	2.0 km	MPC · JPL
89356	2001 VB_{79}	—	November 9, 2001	Palomar	NEAT	·	3.8 km	MPC · JPL
89357	2001 VX_{79}	—	November 9, 2001	Palomar	NEAT	·	3.4 km	MPC · JPL
89358	2001 VA_{80}	—	November 9, 2001	Palomar	NEAT	·	2.2 km	MPC · JPL
89359	2001 VF_{80}	—	November 9, 2001	Palomar	NEAT	·	2.1 km	MPC · JPL
89360	2001 VM_{80}	—	November 10, 2001	Palomar	NEAT	·	4.1 km	MPC · JPL
89361	2001 VR_{80}	—	November 10, 2001	Palomar	NEAT	MAR	2.0 km	MPC · JPL
89362	2001 VS_{80}	—	November 10, 2001	Palomar	NEAT	V	1.4 km	MPC · JPL
89363	2001 VC_{81}	—	November 10, 2001	Palomar	NEAT	·	8.4 km	MPC · JPL
89364	2001 VK_{81}	—	November 13, 2001	Haleakala	NEAT	·	2.0 km	MPC · JPL
89365	2001 VZ_{81}	—	November 12, 2001	Socorro	LINEAR	·	1.5 km	MPC · JPL
89366	2001 VS_{83}	—	November 10, 2001	Socorro	LINEAR	·	2.0 km	MPC · JPL
89367	2001 VT_{84}	—	November 12, 2001	Socorro	LINEAR	·	4.8 km	MPC · JPL
89368	2001 VZ_{85}	—	November 12, 2001	Socorro	LINEAR	·	3.8 km	MPC · JPL
89369	2001 VL_{86}	—	November 12, 2001	Socorro	LINEAR	EUN	3.3 km	MPC · JPL
89370	2001 VU_{86}	—	November 13, 2001	Socorro	LINEAR	·	3.4 km	MPC · JPL
89371	2001 VD_{87}	—	November 15, 2001	Socorro	LINEAR	·	5.7 km	MPC · JPL
89372	2001 VE_{87}	—	November 15, 2001	Socorro	LINEAR	HNS	3.0 km	MPC · JPL
89373	2001 VO_{87}	—	November 14, 2001	Kitt Peak	Spacewatch	·	3.9 km	MPC · JPL
89374	2001 VW_{89}	—	November 15, 2001	Socorro	LINEAR	MAR	2.8 km	MPC · JPL
89375	2001 VB_{91}	—	November 15, 2001	Socorro	LINEAR	EOS	4.1 km	MPC · JPL
89376	2001 VD_{91}	—	November 15, 2001	Socorro	LINEAR	·	3.2 km	MPC · JPL
89377	2001 VS_{93}	—	November 15, 2001	Socorro	LINEAR	·	4.7 km	MPC · JPL
89378	2001 VG_{94}	—	November 15, 2001	Socorro	LINEAR	·	6.7 km	MPC · JPL
89379	2001 VV_{94}	—	November 15, 2001	Socorro	LINEAR	·	3.4 km	MPC · JPL
89380	2001 VF_{96}	—	November 15, 2001	Socorro	LINEAR	·	3.4 km	MPC · JPL
89381	2001 VR_{97}	—	November 15, 2001	Socorro	LINEAR	·	3.9 km	MPC · JPL
89382	2001 VS_{97}	—	November 15, 2001	Socorro	LINEAR	·	2.8 km	MPC · JPL
89383	2001 VQ_{99}	—	November 15, 2001	Socorro	LINEAR	HNS	3.5 km	MPC · JPL
89384	2001 VB_{101}	—	November 12, 2001	Socorro	LINEAR	·	2.7 km	MPC · JPL
89385	2001 VW_{102}	—	November 12, 2001	Socorro	LINEAR	·	5.3 km	MPC · JPL
89386	2001 VG_{105}	—	November 12, 2001	Socorro	LINEAR	·	2.0 km	MPC · JPL
89387	2001 VA_{106}	—	November 12, 2001	Socorro	LINEAR	·	2.2 km	MPC · JPL
89388	2001 VE_{106}	—	November 12, 2001	Socorro	LINEAR	·	2.1 km	MPC · JPL
89389	2001 VY_{107}	—	November 12, 2001	Socorro	LINEAR	·	3.9 km	MPC · JPL
89390	2001 VC_{108}	—	November 12, 2001	Socorro	LINEAR	KOR	2.6 km	MPC · JPL
89391	2001 VU_{108}	—	November 12, 2001	Socorro	LINEAR	·	1.8 km	MPC · JPL
89392	2001 VG_{112}	—	November 12, 2001	Socorro	LINEAR	(5)	3.6 km	MPC · JPL
89393	2001 VT_{116}	—	November 12, 2001	Socorro	LINEAR	HOF	5.6 km	MPC · JPL
89394	2001 VJ_{117}	—	November 12, 2001	Socorro	LINEAR	·	2.7 km	MPC · JPL
89395	2001 VM_{118}	—	November 12, 2001	Socorro	LINEAR	·	4.8 km	MPC · JPL
89396	2001 VT_{118}	—	November 12, 2001	Socorro	LINEAR	·	3.2 km	MPC · JPL
89397	2001 VV_{118}	—	November 12, 2001	Socorro	LINEAR	·	2.6 km	MPC · JPL
89398	2001 VH_{119}	—	November 12, 2001	Socorro	LINEAR	·	3.9 km	MPC · JPL
89399	2001 VM_{120}	—	November 12, 2001	Socorro	LINEAR	·	1.8 km	MPC · JPL
89400	2001 WB	—	November 16, 2001	Oizumi	T. Kobayashi	NYS	2.0 km	MPC · JPL

== 89401–89500 ==
back to top

Designation			Discovery			Properties		Ref
Permanent	Provisional	Named after	Date	Site	Discoverer(s)	Category	Diam.	Ref
89401	2001 WU_{3}	—	November 17, 2001	Kitt Peak	Spacewatch	THM	3.9 km	MPC · JPL
89402	2001 WG_{4}	—	November 19, 2001	Oizumi	T. Kobayashi	·	5.1 km	MPC · JPL
89403	2001 WG_{7}	—	November 17, 2001	Socorro	LINEAR	MAS	1.3 km	MPC · JPL
89404	2001 WS_{8}	—	November 17, 2001	Socorro	LINEAR	·	1.3 km	MPC · JPL
89405	2001 WL_{9}	—	November 17, 2001	Socorro	LINEAR	V	2.1 km	MPC · JPL
89406	2001 WB_{10}	—	November 17, 2001	Socorro	LINEAR	·	1.5 km	MPC · JPL
89407	2001 WF_{10}	—	November 17, 2001	Socorro	LINEAR	V	1.3 km	MPC · JPL
89408	2001 WN_{10}	—	November 17, 2001	Socorro	LINEAR	·	2.9 km	MPC · JPL
89409	2001 WP_{12}	—	November 17, 2001	Socorro	LINEAR	·	1.4 km	MPC · JPL
89410	2001 WQ_{13}	—	November 17, 2001	Socorro	LINEAR	·	3.0 km	MPC · JPL
89411	2001 WO_{16}	—	November 17, 2001	Socorro	LINEAR	KOR	2.5 km	MPC · JPL
89412	2001 WV_{16}	—	November 17, 2001	Socorro	LINEAR	·	3.5 km	MPC · JPL
89413	2001 WM_{21}	—	November 18, 2001	Socorro	LINEAR	·	3.2 km	MPC · JPL
89414	2001 WT_{21}	—	November 18, 2001	Socorro	LINEAR	EOS	4.1 km	MPC · JPL
89415	2001 WM_{25}	—	November 17, 2001	Socorro	LINEAR	·	2.4 km	MPC · JPL
89416	2001 WP_{26}	—	November 17, 2001	Socorro	LINEAR	·	1.2 km	MPC · JPL
89417	2001 WP_{28}	—	November 17, 2001	Socorro	LINEAR	NYS	2.4 km	MPC · JPL
89418	2001 WT_{28}	—	November 17, 2001	Socorro	LINEAR	NYS ·	3.3 km	MPC · JPL
89419	2001 WX_{28}	—	November 17, 2001	Socorro	LINEAR	V	1.7 km	MPC · JPL
89420	2001 WB_{29}	—	November 17, 2001	Socorro	LINEAR	·	1.8 km	MPC · JPL
89421	2001 WS_{29}	—	November 17, 2001	Socorro	LINEAR	·	3.4 km	MPC · JPL
89422	2001 WY_{29}	—	November 17, 2001	Socorro	LINEAR	·	4.5 km	MPC · JPL
89423	2001 WG_{36}	—	November 17, 2001	Socorro	LINEAR	·	2.3 km	MPC · JPL
89424	2001 WB_{38}	—	November 17, 2001	Socorro	LINEAR	·	1.8 km	MPC · JPL
89425	2001 WF_{38}	—	November 17, 2001	Socorro	LINEAR	EOS	4.0 km	MPC · JPL
89426	2001 WU_{38}	—	November 17, 2001	Socorro	LINEAR	·	1.6 km	MPC · JPL
89427	2001 WC_{39}	—	November 17, 2001	Socorro	LINEAR	·	5.4 km	MPC · JPL
89428	2001 WQ_{39}	—	November 17, 2001	Socorro	LINEAR	·	5.3 km	MPC · JPL
89429	2001 WT_{39}	—	November 17, 2001	Socorro	LINEAR	(18466)	6.1 km	MPC · JPL
89430	2001 WK_{40}	—	November 17, 2001	Socorro	LINEAR	·	5.6 km	MPC · JPL
89431	2001 WT_{40}	—	November 17, 2001	Socorro	LINEAR	·	2.8 km	MPC · JPL
89432	2001 WB_{41}	—	November 17, 2001	Socorro	LINEAR	·	2.3 km	MPC · JPL
89433	2001 WM_{41}	—	November 17, 2001	Socorro	LINEAR	·	2.5 km	MPC · JPL
89434	2001 WO_{41}	—	November 17, 2001	Socorro	LINEAR	·	3.7 km	MPC · JPL
89435	2001 WK_{45}	—	November 19, 2001	Socorro	LINEAR	·	4.0 km	MPC · JPL
89436	2001 WE_{46}	—	November 19, 2001	Socorro	LINEAR	·	3.4 km	MPC · JPL
89437	2001 WR_{46}	—	November 19, 2001	Socorro	LINEAR	·	2.0 km	MPC · JPL
89438	2001 WJ_{48}	—	November 19, 2001	Anderson Mesa	LONEOS	·	6.6 km	MPC · JPL
89439	2001 WK_{48}	—	November 19, 2001	Anderson Mesa	LONEOS	·	3.2 km	MPC · JPL
89440	2001 WQ_{49}	—	November 19, 2001	Haleakala	NEAT	·	2.3 km	MPC · JPL
89441	2001 WU_{52}	—	November 19, 2001	Socorro	LINEAR	AGN	2.0 km	MPC · JPL
89442	2001 WA_{54}	—	November 19, 2001	Socorro	LINEAR	·	2.7 km	MPC · JPL
89443	2001 WH_{57}	—	November 19, 2001	Socorro	LINEAR	·	3.9 km	MPC · JPL
89444	2001 WB_{60}	—	November 19, 2001	Socorro	LINEAR	·	2.9 km	MPC · JPL
89445	2001 WS_{78}	—	November 20, 2001	Socorro	LINEAR	·	2.3 km	MPC · JPL
89446	2001 WW_{78}	—	November 20, 2001	Socorro	LINEAR	KOR	2.2 km	MPC · JPL
89447	2001 WT_{86}	—	November 20, 2001	Socorro	LINEAR	·	2.2 km	MPC · JPL
89448	2001 WF_{90}	—	November 21, 2001	Socorro	LINEAR	·	3.3 km	MPC · JPL
89449	2001 WG_{93}	—	November 21, 2001	Haleakala	NEAT	ARM	7.2 km	MPC · JPL
89450	2001 WN_{98}	—	November 19, 2001	Anderson Mesa	LONEOS	·	3.5 km	MPC · JPL
89451	2001 WG_{99}	—	November 17, 2001	Socorro	LINEAR	·	6.5 km	MPC · JPL
89452	2001 WK_{99}	—	November 17, 2001	Socorro	LINEAR	V	1.0 km	MPC · JPL
89453	2001 WF_{102}	—	November 19, 2001	Anderson Mesa	LONEOS	EOS	2.8 km	MPC · JPL
89454	2001 XG	—	December 4, 2001	Socorro	LINEAR	·	2.6 km	MPC · JPL
89455 Metzendorf	2001 XJ_{1}	Metzendorf	December 8, 2001	Starkenburg Observatory	Starkenburg	V	1.5 km	MPC · JPL
89456	2001 XC_{5}	—	December 5, 2001	Haleakala	NEAT	·	2.3 km	MPC · JPL
89457	2001 XD_{5}	—	December 5, 2001	Haleakala	NEAT	·	3.5 km	MPC · JPL
89458	2001 XV_{5}	—	December 7, 2001	Socorro	LINEAR	EUN	2.6 km	MPC · JPL
89459	2001 XX_{5}	—	December 7, 2001	Socorro	LINEAR	EUN	2.8 km	MPC · JPL
89460	2001 XB_{8}	—	December 8, 2001	Socorro	LINEAR	URS · slow	7.7 km	MPC · JPL
89461	2001 XJ_{8}	—	December 9, 2001	Socorro	LINEAR	EUN	3.5 km	MPC · JPL
89462	2001 XB_{11}	—	December 7, 2001	Socorro	LINEAR	AGN	2.4 km	MPC · JPL
89463	2001 XR_{11}	—	December 9, 2001	Socorro	LINEAR	·	2.3 km	MPC · JPL
89464	2001 XZ_{12}	—	December 9, 2001	Socorro	LINEAR	·	5.1 km	MPC · JPL
89465	2001 XF_{16}	—	December 10, 2001	Socorro	LINEAR	slow	9.3 km	MPC · JPL
89466	2001 XL_{17}	—	December 9, 2001	Socorro	LINEAR	·	2.2 km	MPC · JPL
89467	2001 XJ_{19}	—	December 9, 2001	Socorro	LINEAR	·	2.1 km	MPC · JPL
89468	2001 XK_{20}	—	December 9, 2001	Socorro	LINEAR	·	3.1 km	MPC · JPL
89469	2001 XG_{21}	—	December 9, 2001	Socorro	LINEAR	·	2.7 km	MPC · JPL
89470	2001 XB_{22}	—	December 9, 2001	Socorro	LINEAR	·	2.5 km	MPC · JPL
89471	2001 XJ_{22}	—	December 9, 2001	Socorro	LINEAR	·	3.5 km	MPC · JPL
89472	2001 XK_{22}	—	December 9, 2001	Socorro	LINEAR	·	2.2 km	MPC · JPL
89473	2001 XS_{22}	—	December 9, 2001	Socorro	LINEAR	·	2.6 km	MPC · JPL
89474	2001 XA_{23}	—	December 9, 2001	Socorro	LINEAR	·	2.4 km	MPC · JPL
89475	2001 XH_{24}	—	December 10, 2001	Socorro	LINEAR	·	2.6 km	MPC · JPL
89476	2001 XX_{24}	—	December 10, 2001	Socorro	LINEAR	·	4.0 km	MPC · JPL
89477	2001 XL_{25}	—	December 10, 2001	Socorro	LINEAR	·	4.1 km	MPC · JPL
89478	2001 XS_{25}	—	December 10, 2001	Socorro	LINEAR	V	1.6 km	MPC · JPL
89479	2001 XR_{26}	—	December 10, 2001	Socorro	LINEAR	·	3.1 km	MPC · JPL
89480	2001 XE_{27}	—	December 10, 2001	Socorro	LINEAR	·	3.1 km	MPC · JPL
89481	2001 XH_{27}	—	December 10, 2001	Socorro	LINEAR	·	2.1 km	MPC · JPL
89482	2001 XK_{28}	—	December 11, 2001	Socorro	LINEAR	·	2.7 km	MPC · JPL
89483	2001 XE_{29}	—	December 11, 2001	Socorro	LINEAR	V	1.8 km	MPC · JPL
89484	2001 XO_{29}	—	December 11, 2001	Socorro	LINEAR	NYS	3.2 km	MPC · JPL
89485	2001 XK_{31}	—	December 11, 2001	Socorro	LINEAR	·	2.5 km	MPC · JPL
89486	2001 XL_{31}	—	December 11, 2001	Socorro	LINEAR	·	2.2 km	MPC · JPL
89487	2001 XU_{31}	—	December 14, 2001	Oizumi	T. Kobayashi	·	2.8 km	MPC · JPL
89488	2001 XG_{33}	—	December 10, 2001	Kitt Peak	Spacewatch	EOS	3.5 km	MPC · JPL
89489	2001 XR_{33}	—	December 7, 2001	Socorro	LINEAR	·	1.9 km	MPC · JPL
89490	2001 XW_{35}	—	December 9, 2001	Socorro	LINEAR	·	1.7 km	MPC · JPL
89491	2001 XD_{36}	—	December 9, 2001	Socorro	LINEAR	·	3.9 km	MPC · JPL
89492	2001 XP_{36}	—	December 9, 2001	Socorro	LINEAR	·	4.0 km	MPC · JPL
89493	2001 XJ_{38}	—	December 9, 2001	Socorro	LINEAR	V	1.6 km	MPC · JPL
89494	2001 XY_{38}	—	December 9, 2001	Socorro	LINEAR	EUN	4.0 km	MPC · JPL
89495	2001 XX_{40}	—	December 9, 2001	Socorro	LINEAR	EUN	3.5 km	MPC · JPL
89496	2001 XF_{42}	—	December 9, 2001	Socorro	LINEAR	·	5.0 km	MPC · JPL
89497	2001 XX_{42}	—	December 9, 2001	Socorro	LINEAR	·	3.0 km	MPC · JPL
89498	2001 XV_{43}	—	December 9, 2001	Socorro	LINEAR	·	9.2 km	MPC · JPL
89499	2001 XU_{46}	—	December 9, 2001	Socorro	LINEAR	·	3.6 km	MPC · JPL
89500	2001 XK_{48}	—	December 10, 2001	Socorro	LINEAR	NAE	8.0 km	MPC · JPL

== 89501–89600 ==
back to top

Designation			Discovery			Properties		Ref
Permanent	Provisional	Named after	Date	Site	Discoverer(s)	Category	Diam.	Ref
89501	2001 XR_{48}	—	December 10, 2001	Socorro	LINEAR	HNS	3.3 km	MPC · JPL
89502	2001 XS_{48}	—	December 14, 2001	Socorro	LINEAR	·	2.1 km	MPC · JPL
89503	2001 XP_{50}	—	December 10, 2001	Socorro	LINEAR	EOS	3.5 km	MPC · JPL
89504	2001 XV_{50}	—	December 10, 2001	Socorro	LINEAR	·	5.2 km	MPC · JPL
89505	2001 XX_{51}	—	December 10, 2001	Socorro	LINEAR	·	3.5 km	MPC · JPL
89506	2001 XD_{53}	—	December 10, 2001	Socorro	LINEAR	GEF	2.6 km	MPC · JPL
89507	2001 XF_{53}	—	December 10, 2001	Socorro	LINEAR	·	2.2 km	MPC · JPL
89508	2001 XJ_{54}	—	December 11, 2001	Socorro	LINEAR	·	8.1 km	MPC · JPL
89509	2001 XW_{54}	—	December 10, 2001	Socorro	LINEAR	MAS	1.2 km	MPC · JPL
89510	2001 XB_{55}	—	December 11, 2001	Socorro	LINEAR	·	2.1 km	MPC · JPL
89511	2001 XD_{56}	—	December 10, 2001	Socorro	LINEAR	·	4.0 km	MPC · JPL
89512	2001 XF_{56}	—	December 10, 2001	Socorro	LINEAR	MAS	1.4 km	MPC · JPL
89513	2001 XV_{57}	—	December 10, 2001	Socorro	LINEAR	NYS	2.9 km	MPC · JPL
89514	2001 XA_{59}	—	December 10, 2001	Socorro	LINEAR	·	2.1 km	MPC · JPL
89515	2001 XB_{59}	—	December 10, 2001	Socorro	LINEAR	V	2.4 km	MPC · JPL
89516	2001 XN_{59}	—	December 10, 2001	Socorro	LINEAR	·	3.3 km	MPC · JPL
89517	2001 XJ_{61}	—	December 10, 2001	Socorro	LINEAR	NYS	2.4 km	MPC · JPL
89518	2001 XH_{62}	—	December 10, 2001	Socorro	LINEAR	·	2.4 km	MPC · JPL
89519	2001 XV_{62}	—	December 10, 2001	Socorro	LINEAR	NYS	3.3 km	MPC · JPL
89520	2001 XS_{63}	—	December 10, 2001	Socorro	LINEAR	(5)	3.0 km	MPC · JPL
89521	2001 XG_{64}	—	December 10, 2001	Socorro	LINEAR	(5)	2.0 km	MPC · JPL
89522	2001 XL_{64}	—	December 10, 2001	Socorro	LINEAR	·	1.7 km	MPC · JPL
89523	2001 XU_{64}	—	December 10, 2001	Socorro	LINEAR	·	2.8 km	MPC · JPL
89524	2001 XU_{66}	—	December 10, 2001	Socorro	LINEAR	·	2.3 km	MPC · JPL
89525	2001 XA_{68}	—	December 10, 2001	Socorro	LINEAR	·	3.7 km	MPC · JPL
89526	2001 XY_{68}	—	December 11, 2001	Socorro	LINEAR	MRX	2.9 km	MPC · JPL
89527	2001 XE_{71}	—	December 11, 2001	Socorro	LINEAR	·	3.1 km	MPC · JPL
89528	2001 XG_{74}	—	December 11, 2001	Socorro	LINEAR	·	5.1 km	MPC · JPL
89529	2001 XP_{75}	—	December 11, 2001	Socorro	LINEAR	·	1.7 km	MPC · JPL
89530	2001 XA_{76}	—	December 11, 2001	Socorro	LINEAR	·	4.7 km	MPC · JPL
89531	2001 XD_{76}	—	December 11, 2001	Socorro	LINEAR	EOS	3.6 km	MPC · JPL
89532	2001 XP_{77}	—	December 11, 2001	Socorro	LINEAR	·	2.0 km	MPC · JPL
89533	2001 XV_{79}	—	December 11, 2001	Socorro	LINEAR	NYS ·	3.4 km	MPC · JPL
89534	2001 XO_{80}	—	December 11, 2001	Socorro	LINEAR	fast	2.8 km	MPC · JPL
89535	2001 XU_{83}	—	December 11, 2001	Socorro	LINEAR	PHO	4.0 km	MPC · JPL
89536	2001 XG_{84}	—	December 11, 2001	Socorro	LINEAR	(5)	2.3 km	MPC · JPL
89537	2001 XJ_{85}	—	December 11, 2001	Socorro	LINEAR	·	5.2 km	MPC · JPL
89538	2001 XD_{86}	—	December 11, 2001	Socorro	LINEAR	·	3.5 km	MPC · JPL
89539	2001 XK_{86}	—	December 11, 2001	Socorro	LINEAR	NYS	3.3 km	MPC · JPL
89540	2001 XN_{86}	—	December 11, 2001	Socorro	LINEAR	(5)	2.0 km	MPC · JPL
89541	2001 XR_{87}	—	December 13, 2001	Socorro	LINEAR	V	1.6 km	MPC · JPL
89542	2001 XH_{89}	—	December 10, 2001	Socorro	LINEAR	·	4.3 km	MPC · JPL
89543	2001 XT_{90}	—	December 10, 2001	Socorro	LINEAR	·	3.2 km	MPC · JPL
89544	2001 XW_{91}	—	December 10, 2001	Socorro	LINEAR	·	1.4 km	MPC · JPL
89545	2001 XM_{92}	—	December 10, 2001	Socorro	LINEAR	·	3.1 km	MPC · JPL
89546	2001 XU_{92}	—	December 10, 2001	Socorro	LINEAR	KOR	2.7 km	MPC · JPL
89547	2001 XY_{92}	—	December 10, 2001	Socorro	LINEAR	·	3.9 km	MPC · JPL
89548	2001 XR_{97}	—	December 10, 2001	Socorro	LINEAR	·	2.0 km	MPC · JPL
89549	2001 XS_{97}	—	December 10, 2001	Socorro	LINEAR	·	3.9 km	MPC · JPL
89550	2001 XU_{97}	—	December 10, 2001	Socorro	LINEAR	EUN	3.5 km	MPC · JPL
89551	2001 XX_{97}	—	December 10, 2001	Socorro	LINEAR	·	2.4 km	MPC · JPL
89552	2001 XA_{98}	—	December 10, 2001	Socorro	LINEAR	·	2.6 km	MPC · JPL
89553	2001 XE_{98}	—	December 10, 2001	Socorro	LINEAR	·	2.4 km	MPC · JPL
89554	2001 XF_{98}	—	December 10, 2001	Socorro	LINEAR	·	2.5 km	MPC · JPL
89555	2001 XN_{98}	—	December 10, 2001	Socorro	LINEAR	·	3.2 km	MPC · JPL
89556	2001 XS_{98}	—	December 10, 2001	Socorro	LINEAR	·	2.3 km	MPC · JPL
89557	2001 XY_{98}	—	December 10, 2001	Socorro	LINEAR	·	2.3 km	MPC · JPL
89558	2001 XR_{99}	—	December 10, 2001	Socorro	LINEAR	·	3.9 km	MPC · JPL
89559	2001 XT_{99}	—	December 10, 2001	Socorro	LINEAR	·	2.5 km	MPC · JPL
89560	2001 XB_{100}	—	December 10, 2001	Socorro	LINEAR	·	2.6 km	MPC · JPL
89561	2001 XK_{100}	—	December 10, 2001	Socorro	LINEAR	·	2.8 km	MPC · JPL
89562	2001 XN_{100}	—	December 10, 2001	Socorro	LINEAR	·	10 km	MPC · JPL
89563	2001 XY_{101}	—	December 10, 2001	Socorro	LINEAR	·	2.2 km	MPC · JPL
89564	2001 XJ_{103}	—	December 14, 2001	Socorro	LINEAR	·	1.6 km	MPC · JPL
89565	2001 XW_{103}	—	December 14, 2001	Kitt Peak	Spacewatch	·	2.7 km	MPC · JPL
89566	2001 XZ_{103}	—	December 10, 2001	Socorro	LINEAR	·	2.1 km	MPC · JPL
89567	2001 XM_{113}	—	December 11, 2001	Socorro	LINEAR	·	3.0 km	MPC · JPL
89568	2001 XA_{115}	—	December 13, 2001	Socorro	LINEAR	·	5.5 km	MPC · JPL
89569	2001 XB_{115}	—	December 13, 2001	Socorro	LINEAR	·	2.9 km	MPC · JPL
89570	2001 XA_{116}	—	December 13, 2001	Socorro	LINEAR	·	3.6 km	MPC · JPL
89571	2001 XW_{116}	—	December 13, 2001	Socorro	LINEAR	·	2.9 km	MPC · JPL
89572	2001 XX_{117}	—	December 13, 2001	Socorro	LINEAR	·	2.6 km	MPC · JPL
89573	2001 XD_{118}	—	December 13, 2001	Socorro	LINEAR	·	2.7 km	MPC · JPL
89574	2001 XG_{118}	—	December 13, 2001	Socorro	LINEAR	·	3.4 km	MPC · JPL
89575	2001 XD_{119}	—	December 13, 2001	Socorro	LINEAR	EUN	3.0 km	MPC · JPL
89576	2001 XP_{119}	—	December 13, 2001	Socorro	LINEAR	·	4.4 km	MPC · JPL
89577	2001 XW_{120}	—	December 14, 2001	Socorro	LINEAR	ERI	4.6 km	MPC · JPL
89578	2001 XV_{122}	—	December 14, 2001	Socorro	LINEAR	·	3.6 km	MPC · JPL
89579	2001 XE_{127}	—	December 14, 2001	Socorro	LINEAR	(5)	4.1 km	MPC · JPL
89580	2001 XC_{128}	—	December 14, 2001	Socorro	LINEAR	KOR	2.3 km	MPC · JPL
89581	2001 XS_{133}	—	December 14, 2001	Socorro	LINEAR	·	2.2 km	MPC · JPL
89582	2001 XB_{134}	—	December 14, 2001	Socorro	LINEAR	·	3.7 km	MPC · JPL
89583	2001 XO_{134}	—	December 14, 2001	Socorro	LINEAR	·	4.9 km	MPC · JPL
89584	2001 XW_{136}	—	December 14, 2001	Socorro	LINEAR	NYS	2.5 km	MPC · JPL
89585	2001 XN_{138}	—	December 14, 2001	Socorro	LINEAR	NYS	1.8 km	MPC · JPL
89586	2001 XP_{138}	—	December 14, 2001	Socorro	LINEAR	·	2.3 km	MPC · JPL
89587	2001 XN_{139}	—	December 14, 2001	Socorro	LINEAR	·	3.3 km	MPC · JPL
89588	2001 XZ_{139}	—	December 14, 2001	Socorro	LINEAR	·	2.8 km	MPC · JPL
89589	2001 XD_{141}	—	December 14, 2001	Socorro	LINEAR	KOR	2.7 km	MPC · JPL
89590	2001 XE_{141}	—	December 14, 2001	Socorro	LINEAR	·	3.2 km	MPC · JPL
89591	2001 XX_{144}	—	December 14, 2001	Socorro	LINEAR	·	1.9 km	MPC · JPL
89592	2001 XC_{146}	—	December 14, 2001	Socorro	LINEAR	NYS ·	3.3 km	MPC · JPL
89593	2001 XC_{147}	—	December 14, 2001	Socorro	LINEAR	·	5.1 km	MPC · JPL
89594	2001 XS_{147}	—	December 14, 2001	Socorro	LINEAR	·	2.0 km	MPC · JPL
89595	2001 XC_{148}	—	December 14, 2001	Socorro	LINEAR	·	7.4 km	MPC · JPL
89596	2001 XS_{152}	—	December 14, 2001	Socorro	LINEAR	NYS	1.8 km	MPC · JPL
89597	2001 XJ_{159}	—	December 14, 2001	Socorro	LINEAR	V	1.7 km	MPC · JPL
89598	2001 XU_{159}	—	December 14, 2001	Socorro	LINEAR	MAS	1.4 km	MPC · JPL
89599	2001 XW_{161}	—	December 14, 2001	Socorro	LINEAR	NYS	1.5 km	MPC · JPL
89600	2001 XF_{166}	—	December 14, 2001	Socorro	LINEAR	·	2.8 km	MPC · JPL

== 89601–89700 ==
back to top

Designation			Discovery			Properties		Ref
Permanent	Provisional	Named after	Date	Site	Discoverer(s)	Category	Diam.	Ref
89601	2001 XV_{168}	—	December 14, 2001	Socorro	LINEAR	·	2.8 km	MPC · JPL
89602	2001 XA_{169}	—	December 14, 2001	Socorro	LINEAR	·	3.5 km	MPC · JPL
89603	2001 XH_{169}	—	December 14, 2001	Socorro	LINEAR	·	2.7 km	MPC · JPL
89604	2001 XM_{170}	—	December 14, 2001	Socorro	LINEAR	·	2.9 km	MPC · JPL
89605	2001 XT_{172}	—	December 14, 2001	Socorro	LINEAR	TIR · slow	4.0 km	MPC · JPL
89606	2001 XF_{173}	—	December 14, 2001	Socorro	LINEAR	NYS	2.3 km	MPC · JPL
89607	2001 XC_{176}	—	December 14, 2001	Socorro	LINEAR	NYS ·	3.6 km	MPC · JPL
89608	2001 XH_{178}	—	December 14, 2001	Socorro	LINEAR	·	2.7 km	MPC · JPL
89609	2001 XN_{179}	—	December 14, 2001	Socorro	LINEAR	·	1.9 km	MPC · JPL
89610	2001 XR_{181}	—	December 14, 2001	Socorro	LINEAR	·	3.3 km	MPC · JPL
89611	2001 XR_{182}	—	December 14, 2001	Socorro	LINEAR	MAS	1.8 km	MPC · JPL
89612	2001 XV_{183}	—	December 14, 2001	Socorro	LINEAR	·	3.0 km	MPC · JPL
89613	2001 XM_{185}	—	December 14, 2001	Socorro	LINEAR	·	2.2 km	MPC · JPL
89614	2001 XZ_{185}	—	December 14, 2001	Socorro	LINEAR	·	2.6 km	MPC · JPL
89615	2001 XW_{187}	—	December 14, 2001	Socorro	LINEAR	·	2.1 km	MPC · JPL
89616	2001 XH_{189}	—	December 14, 2001	Socorro	LINEAR	NYS	2.2 km	MPC · JPL
89617	2001 XG_{191}	—	December 14, 2001	Socorro	LINEAR	(5)	2.5 km	MPC · JPL
89618	2001 XB_{192}	—	December 14, 2001	Socorro	LINEAR	NYS	2.2 km	MPC · JPL
89619	2001 XE_{192}	—	December 14, 2001	Socorro	LINEAR	·	2.0 km	MPC · JPL
89620	2001 XM_{193}	—	December 14, 2001	Socorro	LINEAR	·	2.2 km	MPC · JPL
89621	2001 XR_{194}	—	December 14, 2001	Socorro	LINEAR	·	7.4 km	MPC · JPL
89622	2001 XH_{195}	—	December 14, 2001	Socorro	LINEAR	·	2.2 km	MPC · JPL
89623	2001 XW_{196}	—	December 14, 2001	Socorro	LINEAR	·	7.5 km	MPC · JPL
89624	2001 XR_{197}	—	December 14, 2001	Socorro	LINEAR	·	7.9 km	MPC · JPL
89625	2001 XF_{198}	—	December 14, 2001	Socorro	LINEAR	·	3.3 km	MPC · JPL
89626	2001 XS_{199}	—	December 14, 2001	Socorro	LINEAR	·	7.8 km	MPC · JPL
89627	2001 XC_{201}	—	December 15, 2001	Socorro	LINEAR	NYS ·	3.1 km	MPC · JPL
89628	2001 XV_{205}	—	December 11, 2001	Socorro	LINEAR	·	4.1 km	MPC · JPL
89629	2001 XJ_{206}	—	December 11, 2001	Socorro	LINEAR	V	1.3 km	MPC · JPL
89630	2001 XX_{206}	—	December 11, 2001	Socorro	LINEAR	·	2.7 km	MPC · JPL
89631	2001 XG_{208}	—	December 11, 2001	Socorro	LINEAR	·	4.7 km	MPC · JPL
89632	2001 XO_{208}	—	December 11, 2001	Socorro	LINEAR	·	2.6 km	MPC · JPL
89633	2001 XM_{210}	—	December 11, 2001	Socorro	LINEAR	(5) · slow	2.0 km	MPC · JPL
89634	2001 XO_{211}	—	December 11, 2001	Socorro	LINEAR	·	3.0 km	MPC · JPL
89635	2001 XK_{213}	—	December 11, 2001	Socorro	LINEAR	·	3.2 km	MPC · JPL
89636	2001 XR_{213}	—	December 11, 2001	Socorro	LINEAR	·	2.5 km	MPC · JPL
89637	2001 XA_{214}	—	December 11, 2001	Socorro	LINEAR	·	3.8 km	MPC · JPL
89638	2001 XP_{214}	—	December 11, 2001	Socorro	LINEAR	·	7.0 km	MPC · JPL
89639	2001 XD_{219}	—	December 15, 2001	Socorro	LINEAR	MAS	1.8 km	MPC · JPL
89640	2001 XP_{221}	—	December 15, 2001	Socorro	LINEAR	·	3.5 km	MPC · JPL
89641	2001 XD_{222}	—	December 15, 2001	Socorro	LINEAR	·	3.9 km	MPC · JPL
89642	2001 XJ_{223}	—	December 15, 2001	Socorro	LINEAR	·	2.5 km	MPC · JPL
89643	2001 XA_{225}	—	December 15, 2001	Socorro	LINEAR	·	1.5 km	MPC · JPL
89644	2001 XQ_{227}	—	December 15, 2001	Socorro	LINEAR	·	2.2 km	MPC · JPL
89645	2001 XX_{229}	—	December 15, 2001	Socorro	LINEAR	HYG	4.7 km	MPC · JPL
89646	2001 XC_{231}	—	December 15, 2001	Socorro	LINEAR	·	2.4 km	MPC · JPL
89647	2001 XS_{231}	—	December 15, 2001	Socorro	LINEAR	NEM	4.4 km	MPC · JPL
89648	2001 XT_{238}	—	December 15, 2001	Socorro	LINEAR	·	2.4 km	MPC · JPL
89649	2001 XA_{241}	—	December 15, 2001	Socorro	LINEAR	·	2.3 km	MPC · JPL
89650	2001 XT_{241}	—	December 14, 2001	Socorro	LINEAR	·	5.2 km	MPC · JPL
89651	2001 XX_{245}	—	December 15, 2001	Socorro	LINEAR	·	5.0 km	MPC · JPL
89652	2001 XO_{249}	—	December 14, 2001	Socorro	LINEAR	·	3.2 km	MPC · JPL
89653	2001 XS_{249}	—	December 14, 2001	Socorro	LINEAR	(7744)	3.2 km	MPC · JPL
89654	2001 XL_{250}	—	December 14, 2001	Socorro	LINEAR	·	4.0 km	MPC · JPL
89655	2001 XA_{251}	—	December 14, 2001	Socorro	LINEAR	·	5.6 km	MPC · JPL
89656	2001 XH_{257}	—	December 7, 2001	Socorro	LINEAR	MAR	2.2 km	MPC · JPL
89657	2001 XO_{259}	—	December 9, 2001	Anderson Mesa	LONEOS	·	6.5 km	MPC · JPL
89658	2001 XX_{261}	—	December 11, 2001	Socorro	LINEAR	·	1.3 km	MPC · JPL
89659	2001 XW_{263}	—	December 14, 2001	Socorro	LINEAR	·	4.1 km	MPC · JPL
89660	2001 YC_{3}	—	December 18, 2001	Socorro	LINEAR	·	2.0 km	MPC · JPL
89661	2001 YD_{3}	—	December 18, 2001	Socorro	LINEAR	·	1.9 km	MPC · JPL
89662	2001 YF_{4}	—	December 21, 2001	Socorro	LINEAR	·	6.2 km	MPC · JPL
89663	2001 YN_{5}	—	December 17, 2001	Cima Ekar	ADAS	ADE	4.1 km	MPC · JPL
89664 Pignata	2001 YU_{5}	Pignata	December 19, 2001	Cima Ekar	ADAS	·	4.5 km	MPC · JPL
89665	2001 YO_{6}	—	December 20, 2001	Cima Ekar	ADAS	GEF	3.0 km	MPC · JPL
89666	2001 YO_{10}	—	December 17, 2001	Socorro	LINEAR	·	6.3 km	MPC · JPL
89667	2001 YK_{11}	—	December 17, 2001	Socorro	LINEAR	·	4.9 km	MPC · JPL
89668	2001 YE_{13}	—	December 17, 2001	Socorro	LINEAR	·	3.4 km	MPC · JPL
89669	2001 YK_{14}	—	December 17, 2001	Socorro	LINEAR	·	2.2 km	MPC · JPL
89670	2001 YN_{17}	—	December 17, 2001	Socorro	LINEAR	EUN	3.2 km	MPC · JPL
89671	2001 YA_{24}	—	December 18, 2001	Socorro	LINEAR	·	2.4 km	MPC · JPL
89672	2001 YG_{26}	—	December 18, 2001	Socorro	LINEAR	EOS	5.8 km	MPC · JPL
89673	2001 YW_{27}	—	December 18, 2001	Socorro	LINEAR	·	2.6 km	MPC · JPL
89674	2001 YP_{37}	—	December 18, 2001	Socorro	LINEAR	·	2.8 km	MPC · JPL
89675	2001 YS_{41}	—	December 18, 2001	Socorro	LINEAR	·	2.1 km	MPC · JPL
89676	2001 YA_{46}	—	December 18, 2001	Socorro	LINEAR	slow	1.5 km	MPC · JPL
89677	2001 YC_{46}	—	December 18, 2001	Socorro	LINEAR	NYS	2.7 km	MPC · JPL
89678	2001 YV_{46}	—	December 18, 2001	Socorro	LINEAR	V	1.3 km	MPC · JPL
89679	2001 YW_{47}	—	December 18, 2001	Socorro	LINEAR	EOS	5.1 km	MPC · JPL
89680	2001 YY_{47}	—	December 18, 2001	Socorro	LINEAR	·	2.8 km	MPC · JPL
89681	2001 YA_{48}	—	December 18, 2001	Socorro	LINEAR	·	4.0 km	MPC · JPL
89682	2001 YF_{48}	—	December 18, 2001	Socorro	LINEAR	·	2.6 km	MPC · JPL
89683	2001 YK_{48}	—	December 18, 2001	Socorro	LINEAR	·	2.2 km	MPC · JPL
89684	2001 YY_{53}	—	December 18, 2001	Socorro	LINEAR	(5)	3.3 km	MPC · JPL
89685	2001 YB_{57}	—	December 18, 2001	Socorro	LINEAR	·	3.6 km	MPC · JPL
89686	2001 YM_{57}	—	December 18, 2001	Socorro	LINEAR	·	2.9 km	MPC · JPL
89687	2001 YX_{62}	—	December 18, 2001	Socorro	LINEAR	·	6.2 km	MPC · JPL
89688	2001 YK_{68}	—	December 18, 2001	Socorro	LINEAR	·	5.9 km	MPC · JPL
89689	2001 YT_{68}	—	December 18, 2001	Socorro	LINEAR	·	3.1 km	MPC · JPL
89690	2001 YA_{70}	—	December 18, 2001	Socorro	LINEAR	·	5.2 km	MPC · JPL
89691	2001 YC_{70}	—	December 18, 2001	Socorro	LINEAR	·	2.4 km	MPC · JPL
89692	2001 YP_{70}	—	December 18, 2001	Socorro	LINEAR	·	1.4 km	MPC · JPL
89693	2001 YF_{72}	—	December 18, 2001	Socorro	LINEAR	·	1.7 km	MPC · JPL
89694	2001 YS_{74}	—	December 18, 2001	Socorro	LINEAR	RAF	2.1 km	MPC · JPL
89695	2001 YU_{74}	—	December 18, 2001	Socorro	LINEAR	NYS	2.1 km	MPC · JPL
89696	2001 YD_{75}	—	December 18, 2001	Socorro	LINEAR	·	2.0 km	MPC · JPL
89697	2001 YA_{78}	—	December 18, 2001	Socorro	LINEAR	NYS	2.1 km	MPC · JPL
89698	2001 YB_{78}	—	December 18, 2001	Socorro	LINEAR	·	5.2 km	MPC · JPL
89699	2001 YU_{79}	—	December 18, 2001	Socorro	LINEAR	·	2.4 km	MPC · JPL
89700	2001 YA_{84}	—	December 18, 2001	Socorro	LINEAR	·	2.7 km	MPC · JPL

== 89701–89800 ==
back to top

Designation			Discovery			Properties		Ref
Permanent	Provisional	Named after	Date	Site	Discoverer(s)	Category	Diam.	Ref
89701	2001 YK_{85}	—	December 18, 2001	Socorro	LINEAR	PAD	3.1 km	MPC · JPL
89702	2001 YG_{86}	—	December 18, 2001	Socorro	LINEAR	·	3.9 km	MPC · JPL
89703	2001 YF_{87}	—	December 18, 2001	Socorro	LINEAR	·	4.2 km	MPC · JPL
89704	2001 YR_{89}	—	December 18, 2001	Socorro	LINEAR	·	1.8 km	MPC · JPL
89705	2001 YY_{93}	—	December 16, 2001	Anderson Mesa	LONEOS	MAR	3.8 km	MPC · JPL
89706	2001 YX_{98}	—	December 17, 2001	Socorro	LINEAR	·	3.4 km	MPC · JPL
89707	2001 YT_{99}	—	December 17, 2001	Socorro	LINEAR	·	2.3 km	MPC · JPL
89708	2001 YB_{105}	—	December 17, 2001	Socorro	LINEAR	·	3.4 km	MPC · JPL
89709	2001 YK_{106}	—	December 17, 2001	Socorro	LINEAR	·	2.7 km	MPC · JPL
89710	2001 YZ_{107}	—	December 17, 2001	Socorro	LINEAR	·	3.6 km	MPC · JPL
89711	2001 YE_{110}	—	December 18, 2001	Socorro	LINEAR	EUN	3.0 km	MPC · JPL
89712	2001 YV_{111}	—	December 18, 2001	Anderson Mesa	LONEOS	·	1.6 km	MPC · JPL
89713	2001 YB_{113}	—	December 17, 2001	Anderson Mesa	LONEOS	HNS	3.0 km	MPC · JPL
89714	2001 YA_{114}	—	December 19, 2001	Socorro	LINEAR	EOS	4.2 km	MPC · JPL
89715	2001 YC_{115}	—	December 17, 2001	Socorro	LINEAR	·	2.9 km	MPC · JPL
89716	2001 YD_{115}	—	December 17, 2001	Socorro	LINEAR	·	2.5 km	MPC · JPL
89717	2001 YE_{116}	—	December 17, 2001	Socorro	LINEAR	·	4.8 km	MPC · JPL
89718	2001 YK_{121}	—	December 17, 2001	Socorro	LINEAR	·	2.9 km	MPC · JPL
89719	2001 YZ_{121}	—	December 17, 2001	Socorro	LINEAR	ADE	7.6 km	MPC · JPL
89720	2001 YQ_{122}	—	December 17, 2001	Socorro	LINEAR	·	2.8 km	MPC · JPL
89721	2001 YS_{123}	—	December 17, 2001	Socorro	LINEAR	·	2.6 km	MPC · JPL
89722	2001 YY_{126}	—	December 17, 2001	Socorro	LINEAR	·	7.8 km	MPC · JPL
89723	2001 YP_{130}	—	December 17, 2001	Socorro	LINEAR	·	2.2 km	MPC · JPL
89724	2001 YR_{130}	—	December 17, 2001	Socorro	LINEAR	·	2.3 km	MPC · JPL
89725	2001 YB_{132}	—	December 19, 2001	Socorro	LINEAR	·	4.4 km	MPC · JPL
89726	2001 YA_{134}	—	December 17, 2001	Socorro	LINEAR	·	2.5 km	MPC · JPL
89727	2001 YB_{135}	—	December 19, 2001	Socorro	LINEAR	·	3.7 km	MPC · JPL
89728	2001 YC_{136}	—	December 22, 2001	Socorro	LINEAR	EUN	3.6 km	MPC · JPL
89729	2001 YQ_{136}	—	December 22, 2001	Socorro	LINEAR	·	2.0 km	MPC · JPL
89730	2001 YK_{137}	—	December 22, 2001	Socorro	LINEAR	·	2.6 km	MPC · JPL
89731	2001 YE_{141}	—	December 17, 2001	Palomar	NEAT	V	1.2 km	MPC · JPL
89732	2001 YE_{146}	—	December 18, 2001	Socorro	LINEAR	NYS	1.9 km	MPC · JPL
89733	2001 YD_{149}	—	December 19, 2001	Palomar	NEAT	·	5.6 km	MPC · JPL
89734 Orsoperuzzi	2002 AH	Orsoperuzzi	January 4, 2002	San Marcello	M. Tombelli, A. Boattini	·	2.6 km	MPC · JPL
89735 Tommei	2002 AM	Tommei	January 4, 2002	San Marcello	A. Boattini, L. Tesi	·	7.1 km	MPC · JPL
89736	2002 AC_{1}	—	January 15, 2002	Socorro	LINEAR	V	1.8 km	MPC · JPL
89737	2002 AW_{3}	—	January 8, 2002	Oizumi	T. Kobayashi	·	4.3 km	MPC · JPL
89738	2002 AO_{5}	—	January 9, 2002	Oizumi	T. Kobayashi	·	3.1 km	MPC · JPL
89739 Rampazzi	2002 AL_{7}	Rampazzi	January 9, 2002	Cima Ekar	ADAS	·	3.1 km	MPC · JPL
89740	2002 AB_{9}	—	January 9, 2002	Nashville	Clingan, R.	EOS	3.5 km	MPC · JPL
89741	2002 AV_{9}	—	January 11, 2002	Desert Eagle	W. K. Y. Yeung	fast	4.4 km	MPC · JPL
89742	2002 AW_{16}	—	January 5, 2002	Haleakala	NEAT	·	7.2 km	MPC · JPL
89743	2002 AD_{17}	—	January 5, 2002	Haleakala	NEAT	EOS	4.0 km	MPC · JPL
89744	2002 AG_{18}	—	January 8, 2002	Cima Ekar	ADAS	·	3.8 km	MPC · JPL
89745	2002 AT_{19}	—	January 8, 2002	Socorro	LINEAR	HYG	8.4 km	MPC · JPL
89746	2002 AG_{20}	—	January 5, 2002	Haleakala	NEAT	·	2.8 km	MPC · JPL
89747	2002 AR_{20}	—	January 6, 2002	Haleakala	NEAT	V	1.6 km	MPC · JPL
89748	2002 AS_{21}	—	January 9, 2002	Socorro	LINEAR	·	5.2 km	MPC · JPL
89749	2002 AT_{23}	—	January 6, 2002	Palomar	NEAT	·	4.5 km	MPC · JPL
89750	2002 AB_{24}	—	January 7, 2002	Palomar	NEAT	·	3.8 km	MPC · JPL
89751	2002 AM_{26}	—	January 11, 2002	Kitt Peak	Spacewatch	slow	3.2 km	MPC · JPL
89752	2002 AX_{32}	—	January 12, 2002	Palomar	NEAT	·	2.5 km	MPC · JPL
89753	2002 AO_{34}	—	January 10, 2002	Palomar	NEAT	EOS	5.9 km	MPC · JPL
89754	2002 AT_{36}	—	January 9, 2002	Socorro	LINEAR	·	2.2 km	MPC · JPL
89755	2002 AJ_{39}	—	January 9, 2002	Socorro	LINEAR	·	2.4 km	MPC · JPL
89756	2002 AE_{54}	—	January 9, 2002	Socorro	LINEAR	·	5.2 km	MPC · JPL
89757	2002 AW_{54}	—	January 9, 2002	Socorro	LINEAR	·	4.0 km	MPC · JPL
89758	2002 AX_{54}	—	January 9, 2002	Socorro	LINEAR	MAS	1.1 km	MPC · JPL
89759	2002 AF_{56}	—	January 9, 2002	Socorro	LINEAR	·	3.6 km	MPC · JPL
89760	2002 AZ_{56}	—	January 9, 2002	Socorro	LINEAR	WIT	1.7 km	MPC · JPL
89761	2002 AA_{59}	—	January 9, 2002	Socorro	LINEAR	NYS	3.6 km	MPC · JPL
89762	2002 AM_{60}	—	January 9, 2002	Socorro	LINEAR	MAS	1.7 km	MPC · JPL
89763	2002 AY_{60}	—	January 11, 2002	Socorro	LINEAR	·	2.5 km	MPC · JPL
89764	2002 AW_{61}	—	January 11, 2002	Socorro	LINEAR	·	3.8 km	MPC · JPL
89765	2002 AA_{62}	—	January 11, 2002	Socorro	LINEAR	·	4.1 km	MPC · JPL
89766	2002 AO_{62}	—	January 11, 2002	Socorro	LINEAR	·	1.9 km	MPC · JPL
89767	2002 AF_{71}	—	January 8, 2002	Socorro	LINEAR	NYS	2.5 km	MPC · JPL
89768	2002 AU_{71}	—	January 8, 2002	Socorro	LINEAR	NYS	2.2 km	MPC · JPL
89769	2002 AQ_{73}	—	January 8, 2002	Socorro	LINEAR	·	1.8 km	MPC · JPL
89770	2002 AX_{81}	—	January 9, 2002	Socorro	LINEAR	·	3.5 km	MPC · JPL
89771	2002 AD_{82}	—	January 9, 2002	Socorro	LINEAR	EUN	3.5 km	MPC · JPL
89772	2002 AT_{82}	—	January 9, 2002	Socorro	LINEAR	·	2.6 km	MPC · JPL
89773	2002 AJ_{84}	—	January 9, 2002	Socorro	LINEAR	·	9.3 km	MPC · JPL
89774	2002 AZ_{88}	—	January 9, 2002	Socorro	LINEAR	·	4.6 km	MPC · JPL
89775	2002 AJ_{90}	—	January 11, 2002	Socorro	LINEAR	(5)	2.0 km	MPC · JPL
89776	2002 AL_{90}	—	January 11, 2002	Socorro	LINEAR	·	4.3 km	MPC · JPL
89777	2002 AR_{90}	—	January 12, 2002	Socorro	LINEAR	·	7.6 km	MPC · JPL
89778	2002 AK_{94}	—	January 8, 2002	Socorro	LINEAR	EUN	2.7 km	MPC · JPL
89779	2002 AO_{97}	—	January 8, 2002	Socorro	LINEAR	·	3.9 km	MPC · JPL
89780	2002 AY_{100}	—	January 8, 2002	Socorro	LINEAR	NYS	3.2 km	MPC · JPL
89781	2002 AT_{105}	—	January 9, 2002	Socorro	LINEAR	·	1.4 km	MPC · JPL
89782	2002 AM_{108}	—	January 9, 2002	Socorro	LINEAR	·	7.2 km	MPC · JPL
89783	2002 AT_{109}	—	January 9, 2002	Socorro	LINEAR	EOS	3.6 km	MPC · JPL
89784	2002 AZ_{109}	—	January 9, 2002	Socorro	LINEAR	·	2.6 km	MPC · JPL
89785	2002 AB_{110}	—	January 9, 2002	Socorro	LINEAR	·	6.5 km	MPC · JPL
89786	2002 AA_{112}	—	January 9, 2002	Socorro	LINEAR	·	4.8 km	MPC · JPL
89787	2002 AB_{112}	—	January 9, 2002	Socorro	LINEAR	NYS	2.9 km	MPC · JPL
89788	2002 AE_{115}	—	January 9, 2002	Socorro	LINEAR	·	6.1 km	MPC · JPL
89789	2002 AJ_{116}	—	January 9, 2002	Socorro	LINEAR	·	6.0 km	MPC · JPL
89790	2002 AD_{117}	—	January 9, 2002	Socorro	LINEAR	·	4.1 km	MPC · JPL
89791	2002 AG_{118}	—	January 9, 2002	Socorro	LINEAR	·	2.2 km	MPC · JPL
89792	2002 AP_{120}	—	January 9, 2002	Socorro	LINEAR	EOS	4.8 km	MPC · JPL
89793	2002 AJ_{121}	—	January 9, 2002	Socorro	LINEAR	THM	7.4 km	MPC · JPL
89794	2002 AB_{125}	—	January 11, 2002	Socorro	LINEAR	TIR	4.7 km	MPC · JPL
89795	2002 AO_{126}	—	January 13, 2002	Socorro	LINEAR	KOR	2.3 km	MPC · JPL
89796	2002 AT_{130}	—	January 12, 2002	Palomar	NEAT	HYG	7.3 km	MPC · JPL
89797	2002 AW_{133}	—	January 9, 2002	Socorro	LINEAR	·	2.3 km	MPC · JPL
89798	2002 AK_{137}	—	January 9, 2002	Socorro	LINEAR	·	2.7 km	MPC · JPL
89799	2002 AS_{144}	—	January 13, 2002	Socorro	LINEAR	·	3.6 km	MPC · JPL
89800	2002 AW_{148}	—	January 11, 2002	Socorro	LINEAR	·	5.4 km	MPC · JPL

== 89801–89900 ==
back to top

Designation			Discovery			Properties		Ref
Permanent	Provisional	Named after	Date	Site	Discoverer(s)	Category	Diam.	Ref
89801	2002 AM_{151}	—	January 14, 2002	Socorro	LINEAR	·	3.1 km	MPC · JPL
89802	2002 AC_{155}	—	January 14, 2002	Socorro	LINEAR	·	2.9 km	MPC · JPL
89803	2002 AD_{155}	—	January 14, 2002	Socorro	LINEAR	HYG	6.5 km	MPC · JPL
89804	2002 AO_{157}	—	January 13, 2002	Socorro	LINEAR	(1298)	7.3 km	MPC · JPL
89805	2002 AM_{159}	—	January 13, 2002	Socorro	LINEAR	T_{j} (2.99) · EUP	6.9 km	MPC · JPL
89806	2002 AL_{160}	—	January 13, 2002	Socorro	LINEAR	·	8.0 km	MPC · JPL
89807	2002 AY_{160}	—	January 13, 2002	Socorro	LINEAR	·	4.9 km	MPC · JPL
89808	2002 AC_{162}	—	January 13, 2002	Socorro	LINEAR	THM	7.0 km	MPC · JPL
89809	2002 AM_{166}	—	January 13, 2002	Socorro	LINEAR	KOR	3.7 km	MPC · JPL
89810	2002 AF_{170}	—	January 14, 2002	Socorro	LINEAR	NYS	1.8 km	MPC · JPL
89811	2002 AH_{176}	—	January 14, 2002	Socorro	LINEAR	·	6.4 km	MPC · JPL
89812	2002 AK_{178}	—	January 14, 2002	Socorro	LINEAR	KOR	3.7 km	MPC · JPL
89813	2002 AR_{181}	—	January 5, 2002	Palomar	NEAT	·	3.0 km	MPC · JPL
89814	2002 AX_{181}	—	January 5, 2002	Palomar	NEAT	·	3.6 km	MPC · JPL
89815	2002 AB_{186}	—	January 8, 2002	Socorro	LINEAR	·	5.2 km	MPC · JPL
89816	2002 AN_{187}	—	January 8, 2002	Socorro	LINEAR	·	5.2 km	MPC · JPL
89817	2002 AB_{189}	—	January 10, 2002	Palomar	NEAT	·	2.4 km	MPC · JPL
89818 Jureskvarč	2002 AX_{203}	Jureskvarč	January 2, 2002	Cima Ekar	ADAS	·	2.3 km	MPC · JPL
89819	2002 BN_{1}	—	January 19, 2002	Desert Eagle	W. K. Y. Yeung	·	3.5 km	MPC · JPL
89820	2002 BX_{2}	—	January 18, 2002	Anderson Mesa	LONEOS	EUN	3.5 km	MPC · JPL
89821	2002 BM_{3}	—	January 20, 2002	Anderson Mesa	LONEOS	EMA	8.3 km	MPC · JPL
89822	2002 BW_{3}	—	January 18, 2002	Anderson Mesa	LONEOS	·	3.2 km	MPC · JPL
89823	2002 BE_{9}	—	January 18, 2002	Socorro	LINEAR	·	3.9 km	MPC · JPL
89824	2002 BP_{11}	—	January 19, 2002	Socorro	LINEAR	·	2.1 km	MPC · JPL
89825	2002 BA_{15}	—	January 19, 2002	Socorro	LINEAR	·	4.4 km	MPC · JPL
89826	2002 BH_{15}	—	January 19, 2002	Socorro	LINEAR	KOR	3.1 km	MPC · JPL
89827	2002 BE_{22}	—	January 21, 2002	Socorro	LINEAR	·	3.2 km	MPC · JPL
89828	2002 BY_{28}	—	January 19, 2002	Anderson Mesa	LONEOS	EUP	12 km	MPC · JPL
89829	2002 BQ_{29}	—	January 20, 2002	Anderson Mesa	LONEOS	L4	17 km	MPC · JPL
89830	2002 CE	—	February 1, 2002	Socorro	LINEAR	AMO +1km · PHA	5.1 km	MPC · JPL
89831	2002 CW_{4}	—	February 5, 2002	Fountain Hills	C. W. Juels, P. R. Holvorcem	·	8.5 km	MPC · JPL
89832	2002 CQ_{5}	—	February 4, 2002	Haleakala	NEAT	NYS	2.0 km	MPC · JPL
89833	2002 CE_{8}	—	February 4, 2002	Palomar	NEAT	·	4.3 km	MPC · JPL
89834	2002 CB_{10}	—	February 6, 2002	Socorro	LINEAR	PHO	3.0 km	MPC · JPL
89835	2002 CM_{12}	—	February 7, 2002	Ametlla de Mar	J. Nomen	(5)	2.9 km	MPC · JPL
89836	2002 CM_{15}	—	February 7, 2002	Socorro	LINEAR	L4	10 km	MPC · JPL
89837	2002 CZ_{23}	—	February 6, 2002	Palomar	NEAT	·	2.1 km	MPC · JPL
89838	2002 CJ_{31}	—	February 6, 2002	Socorro	LINEAR	·	4.3 km	MPC · JPL
89839	2002 CE_{32}	—	February 6, 2002	Socorro	LINEAR	EOS	4.1 km	MPC · JPL
89840	2002 CV_{37}	—	February 7, 2002	Socorro	LINEAR	KOR	3.0 km	MPC · JPL
89841	2002 CM_{41}	—	February 7, 2002	Palomar	NEAT	L4	20 km	MPC · JPL
89842	2002 CZ_{48}	—	February 3, 2002	Haleakala	NEAT	·	5.1 km	MPC · JPL
89843	2002 CT_{58}	—	February 13, 2002	Farpoint	G. Hug	·	5.2 km	MPC · JPL
89844	2002 CP_{64}	—	February 6, 2002	Socorro	LINEAR	L4	20 km	MPC · JPL
89845	2002 CQ_{64}	—	February 6, 2002	Socorro	LINEAR	·	6.3 km	MPC · JPL
89846	2002 CK_{69}	—	February 7, 2002	Socorro	LINEAR	MAS	1.4 km	MPC · JPL
89847	2002 CN_{72}	—	February 7, 2002	Socorro	LINEAR	·	3.7 km	MPC · JPL
89848	2002 CK_{73}	—	February 7, 2002	Socorro	LINEAR	KOR	2.4 km	MPC · JPL
89849	2002 CF_{76}	—	February 7, 2002	Socorro	LINEAR	AST	3.4 km	MPC · JPL
89850	2002 CD_{77}	—	February 7, 2002	Socorro	LINEAR	·	5.9 km	MPC · JPL
89851	2002 CE_{80}	—	February 7, 2002	Socorro	LINEAR	·	4.0 km	MPC · JPL
89852	2002 CY_{82}	—	February 7, 2002	Socorro	LINEAR	L4	10 km	MPC · JPL
89853	2002 CJ_{84}	—	February 7, 2002	Socorro	LINEAR	·	4.0 km	MPC · JPL
89854	2002 CC_{89}	—	February 7, 2002	Socorro	LINEAR	·	3.8 km	MPC · JPL
89855	2002 CZ_{92}	—	February 7, 2002	Socorro	LINEAR	EOS	4.4 km	MPC · JPL
89856	2002 CE_{93}	—	February 7, 2002	Socorro	LINEAR	KOR	2.8 km	MPC · JPL
89857	2002 CL_{95}	—	February 7, 2002	Socorro	LINEAR	·	7.8 km	MPC · JPL
89858	2002 CK_{96}	—	February 7, 2002	Socorro	LINEAR	L4	19 km	MPC · JPL
89859	2002 CS_{117}	—	February 12, 2002	Desert Eagle	W. K. Y. Yeung	EOS	5.1 km	MPC · JPL
89860	2002 CL_{120}	—	February 7, 2002	Socorro	LINEAR	·	2.7 km	MPC · JPL
89861	2002 CF_{124}	—	February 7, 2002	Socorro	LINEAR	(5)	2.2 km	MPC · JPL
89862	2002 CM_{125}	—	February 7, 2002	Socorro	LINEAR	·	6.8 km	MPC · JPL
89863	2002 CV_{126}	—	February 7, 2002	Socorro	LINEAR	·	5.1 km	MPC · JPL
89864	2002 CH_{128}	—	February 7, 2002	Socorro	LINEAR	·	6.0 km	MPC · JPL
89865	2002 CP_{129}	—	February 7, 2002	Socorro	LINEAR	KOR	2.8 km	MPC · JPL
89866	2002 CW_{130}	—	February 7, 2002	Socorro	LINEAR	·	3.3 km	MPC · JPL
89867	2002 CP_{139}	—	February 8, 2002	Socorro	LINEAR	·	2.2 km	MPC · JPL
89868	2002 CO_{141}	—	February 8, 2002	Socorro	LINEAR	·	8.8 km	MPC · JPL
89869	2002 CB_{142}	—	February 8, 2002	Socorro	LINEAR	·	5.1 km	MPC · JPL
89870	2002 CS_{142}	—	February 9, 2002	Socorro	LINEAR	·	1.9 km	MPC · JPL
89871	2002 CU_{143}	—	February 9, 2002	Socorro	LINEAR	L4	20 km	MPC · JPL
89872	2002 CZ_{144}	—	February 9, 2002	Socorro	LINEAR	L4	20 km	MPC · JPL
89873	2002 CT_{158}	—	February 7, 2002	Socorro	LINEAR	EUN	3.0 km	MPC · JPL
89874	2002 CL_{160}	—	February 8, 2002	Socorro	LINEAR	·	3.0 km	MPC · JPL
89875	2002 CP_{173}	—	February 8, 2002	Socorro	LINEAR	EMA	8.5 km	MPC · JPL
89876	2002 CF_{182}	—	February 10, 2002	Socorro	LINEAR	·	3.5 km	MPC · JPL
89877	2002 CD_{199}	—	February 10, 2002	Socorro	LINEAR	KOR	2.5 km	MPC · JPL
89878	2002 CL_{207}	—	February 10, 2002	Socorro	LINEAR	L4	10 km	MPC · JPL
89879	2002 CH_{211}	—	February 10, 2002	Socorro	LINEAR	KOR	2.6 km	MPC · JPL
89880	2002 CZ_{216}	—	February 10, 2002	Socorro	LINEAR	KOR	3.1 km	MPC · JPL
89881	2002 CG_{219}	—	February 10, 2002	Socorro	LINEAR	·	4.0 km	MPC · JPL
89882	2002 CS_{221}	—	February 10, 2002	Socorro	LINEAR	EUN	3.4 km	MPC · JPL
89883	2002 CS_{223}	—	February 11, 2002	Socorro	LINEAR	KOR	2.4 km	MPC · JPL
89884	2002 CS_{226}	—	February 5, 2002	Palomar	NEAT	LIX	7.7 km	MPC · JPL
89885	2002 CP_{228}	—	February 6, 2002	Palomar	NEAT	CYB	6.6 km	MPC · JPL
89886	2002 CT_{230}	—	February 14, 2002	Cerro Tololo	Deep Lens Survey	L4	10 km	MPC · JPL
89887	2002 CD_{238}	—	February 11, 2002	Socorro	LINEAR	DOR	6.8 km	MPC · JPL
89888	2002 CW_{239}	—	February 11, 2002	Socorro	LINEAR	EUN	3.5 km	MPC · JPL
89889	2002 CD_{245}	—	February 13, 2002	Socorro	LINEAR	·	6.0 km	MPC · JPL
89890	2002 CX_{248}	—	February 15, 2002	Haleakala	NEAT	·	4.2 km	MPC · JPL
89891	2002 CQ_{256}	—	February 4, 2002	Palomar	NEAT	·	3.7 km	MPC · JPL
89892	2002 CE_{257}	—	February 5, 2002	Palomar	NEAT	THM	6.1 km	MPC · JPL
89893	2002 CX_{265}	—	February 7, 2002	Kitt Peak	Spacewatch	MAS	1.5 km	MPC · JPL
89894	2002 CO_{272}	—	February 8, 2002	Anderson Mesa	LONEOS	·	6.0 km	MPC · JPL
89895	2002 CY_{274}	—	February 8, 2002	Socorro	LINEAR	·	6.1 km	MPC · JPL
89896	2002 CG_{275}	—	February 9, 2002	Anderson Mesa	LONEOS	·	6.4 km	MPC · JPL
89897	2002 CC_{279}	—	February 7, 2002	Socorro	LINEAR	·	4.1 km	MPC · JPL
89898	2002 CY_{279}	—	February 7, 2002	Kitt Peak	Spacewatch	L4	10 km	MPC · JPL
89899	2002 CT_{291}	—	February 11, 2002	Kitt Peak	Spacewatch	·	5.6 km	MPC · JPL
89900	2002 CJ_{293}	—	February 11, 2002	Socorro	LINEAR	·	6.7 km	MPC · JPL

== 89901–90000 ==
back to top

Designation			Discovery			Properties		Ref
Permanent	Provisional	Named after	Date	Site	Discoverer(s)	Category	Diam.	Ref
89901	2002 CD_{299}	—	February 12, 2002	Socorro	LINEAR	·	5.3 km	MPC · JPL
89902	2002 CA_{306}	—	February 4, 2002	Palomar	NEAT	HYG	6.8 km	MPC · JPL
89903 Post	2002 DL_{3}	Post	February 20, 2002	Desert Moon	Stevens, B. L.	3:2	9.1 km	MPC · JPL
89904	2002 DO_{5}	—	February 16, 2002	Haleakala	NEAT	EOS	5.0 km	MPC · JPL
89905	2002 DN_{7}	—	February 19, 2002	Socorro	LINEAR	·	3.1 km	MPC · JPL
89906	2002 DQ_{7}	—	February 19, 2002	Socorro	LINEAR	·	8.3 km	MPC · JPL
89907	2002 DT_{7}	—	February 19, 2002	Socorro	LINEAR	EUN	4.4 km	MPC · JPL
89908	2002 DK_{17}	—	February 20, 2002	Kitt Peak	Spacewatch	·	7.8 km	MPC · JPL
89909 Linie	2002 ET_{2}	Linie	March 8, 2002	Kleť	KLENOT	THM	5.2 km	MPC · JPL
89910	2002 ED_{5}	—	March 10, 2002	Cima Ekar	ADAS	·	3.9 km	MPC · JPL
89911	2002 ER_{8}	—	March 9, 2002	Kvistaberg	Uppsala-DLR Asteroid Survey	·	4.7 km	MPC · JPL
89912	2002 EY_{13}	—	March 5, 2002	Palomar	NEAT	·	6.5 km	MPC · JPL
89913	2002 EC_{24}	—	March 5, 2002	Kitt Peak	Spacewatch	L4	10 km	MPC · JPL
89914	2002 EQ_{25}	—	March 10, 2002	Anderson Mesa	LONEOS	·	3.9 km	MPC · JPL
89915	2002 ED_{32}	—	March 9, 2002	Palomar	NEAT	·	4.0 km	MPC · JPL
89916	2002 EN_{32}	—	March 10, 2002	Haleakala	NEAT	·	2.3 km	MPC · JPL
89917	2002 ET_{32}	—	March 11, 2002	Palomar	NEAT	·	6.4 km	MPC · JPL
89918	2002 ER_{33}	—	March 11, 2002	Palomar	NEAT	L4	12 km	MPC · JPL
89919	2002 EF_{35}	—	March 11, 2002	Palomar	NEAT	EOS	3.7 km	MPC · JPL
89920	2002 EN_{41}	—	March 12, 2002	Socorro	LINEAR	AGN	2.9 km	MPC · JPL
89921	2002 EH_{45}	—	March 10, 2002	Haleakala	NEAT	(5)	3.3 km	MPC · JPL
89922	2002 EV_{45}	—	March 11, 2002	Palomar	NEAT	L4	12 km	MPC · JPL
89923	2002 EN_{47}	—	March 12, 2002	Palomar	NEAT	KOR	3.2 km	MPC · JPL
89924	2002 ED_{51}	—	March 12, 2002	Kitt Peak	Spacewatch	L4	19 km	MPC · JPL
89925	2002 EY_{52}	—	March 9, 2002	Socorro	LINEAR	·	9.0 km	MPC · JPL
89926	2002 EH_{53}	—	March 13, 2002	Socorro	LINEAR	·	8.0 km	MPC · JPL
89927	2002 EP_{61}	—	March 13, 2002	Socorro	LINEAR	L4	10 km	MPC · JPL
89928	2002 EB_{70}	—	March 13, 2002	Socorro	LINEAR	3:2	5.8 km	MPC · JPL
89929	2002 EO_{75}	—	March 14, 2002	Palomar	NEAT	EOS	4.8 km	MPC · JPL
89930	2002 EN_{80}	—	March 12, 2002	Palomar	NEAT	EOS	3.3 km	MPC · JPL
89931	2002 EF_{84}	—	March 9, 2002	Socorro	LINEAR	·	7.3 km	MPC · JPL
89932	2002 EV_{85}	—	March 9, 2002	Socorro	LINEAR	ADE	7.2 km	MPC · JPL
89933	2002 EA_{89}	—	March 9, 2002	Socorro	LINEAR	·	4.0 km	MPC · JPL
89934	2002 EH_{95}	—	March 14, 2002	Socorro	LINEAR	L4	18 km	MPC · JPL
89935	2002 EL_{138}	—	March 12, 2002	Palomar	NEAT	L4	17 km	MPC · JPL
89936	2002 EK_{152}	—	March 15, 2002	Palomar	NEAT	EOS	4.7 km	MPC · JPL
89937	2002 FP_{1}	—	March 19, 2002	Fountain Hills	Hills, Fountain	·	11 km	MPC · JPL
89938	2002 FR_{4}	—	March 19, 2002	Palomar	NEAT	L4 · 006	20 km	MPC · JPL
89939	2002 FV_{7}	—	March 16, 2002	Socorro	LINEAR	LUT	9.3 km	MPC · JPL
89940	2002 FG_{8}	—	March 16, 2002	Socorro	LINEAR	L4	20 km	MPC · JPL
89941	2002 FZ_{20}	—	March 19, 2002	Palomar	NEAT	·	8.4 km	MPC · JPL
89942	2002 FA_{23}	—	March 17, 2002	Kitt Peak	Spacewatch	·	11 km	MPC · JPL
89943	2002 FG_{29}	—	March 20, 2002	Socorro	LINEAR	·	2.0 km	MPC · JPL
89944	2002 FD_{32}	—	March 20, 2002	Anderson Mesa	LONEOS	·	5.2 km	MPC · JPL
89945	2002 GZ_{33}	—	April 1, 2002	Palomar	NEAT	·	5.1 km	MPC · JPL
89946	2002 GP_{39}	—	April 4, 2002	Kitt Peak	Spacewatch	slow	5.5 km	MPC · JPL
89947	2002 GQ_{48}	—	April 4, 2002	Haleakala	NEAT	CYB	6.3 km	MPC · JPL
89948	2002 GJ_{57}	—	April 8, 2002	Palomar	NEAT	EOS	4.3 km	MPC · JPL
89949	2002 GS_{118}	—	April 12, 2002	Palomar	NEAT	NEM	5.2 km	MPC · JPL
89950	2002 GJ_{133}	—	April 12, 2002	Socorro	LINEAR	EOS	4.4 km	MPC · JPL
89951	2002 GU_{154}	—	April 13, 2002	Palomar	NEAT	EOS	4.7 km	MPC · JPL
89952	2002 JB_{20}	—	May 6, 2002	Palomar	NEAT	·	7.8 km	MPC · JPL
89953	2002 JZ_{91}	—	May 11, 2002	Socorro	LINEAR	·	2.1 km	MPC · JPL
89954	2002 JY_{98}	—	May 13, 2002	Palomar	NEAT	·	3.4 km	MPC · JPL
89955	2002 JA_{119}	—	May 5, 2002	Palomar	NEAT	·	4.0 km	MPC · JPL
89956 Leibacher	2002 LJ_{5}	Leibacher	June 6, 2002	Fountain Hills	C. W. Juels, P. R. Holvorcem	·	7.8 km	MPC · JPL
89957	2002 LQ_{41}	—	June 10, 2002	Socorro	LINEAR	·	4.0 km	MPC · JPL
89958	2002 LY_{45}	—	June 14, 2002	Socorro	LINEAR	APO +1km · PHA	1.3 km	MPC · JPL
89959	2002 NT_{7}	—	July 9, 2002	Socorro	LINEAR	APO +1km · PHA	1.4 km	MPC · JPL
89960	2002 ND_{35}	—	July 9, 2002	Socorro	LINEAR	·	5.3 km	MPC · JPL
89961	2002 PC_{72}	—	August 12, 2002	Socorro	LINEAR	·	6.5 km	MPC · JPL
89962	2002 PL_{128}	—	August 14, 2002	Socorro	LINEAR	·	3.8 km	MPC · JPL
89963	2002 QH_{6}	—	August 18, 2002	Socorro	LINEAR	H	1.2 km	MPC · JPL
89964	2002 QZ_{24}	—	August 28, 2002	Socorro	LINEAR	H	1.4 km	MPC · JPL
89965	2002 RX_{7}	—	September 3, 2002	Haleakala	NEAT	KOR	3.4 km	MPC · JPL
89966	2002 RX_{24}	—	September 4, 2002	Anderson Mesa	LONEOS	(5)	2.7 km	MPC · JPL
89967	2002 RD_{65}	—	September 5, 2002	Socorro	LINEAR	·	4.2 km	MPC · JPL
89968	2002 RY_{81}	—	September 5, 2002	Socorro	LINEAR	·	1.4 km	MPC · JPL
89969	2002 RW_{87}	—	September 5, 2002	Socorro	LINEAR	NYS	1.8 km	MPC · JPL
89970	2002 RQ_{90}	—	September 5, 2002	Socorro	LINEAR	(5)	2.0 km	MPC · JPL
89971	2002 RX_{105}	—	September 5, 2002	Socorro	LINEAR	·	3.3 km	MPC · JPL
89972	2002 RB_{108}	—	September 5, 2002	Socorro	LINEAR	·	2.0 km	MPC · JPL
89973 Aranyjános	2002 RR_{117}	Aranyjános	September 8, 2002	Piszkéstető	K. Sárneczky	·	1.3 km	MPC · JPL
89974	2002 RA_{150}	—	September 11, 2002	Haleakala	NEAT	·	2.2 km	MPC · JPL
89975	2002 RH_{191}	—	September 12, 2002	Haleakala	NEAT	PHO	4.8 km	MPC · JPL
89976	2002 SQ_{21}	—	September 26, 2002	Palomar	NEAT	·	4.8 km	MPC · JPL
89977	2002 TX_{3}	—	October 1, 2002	Anderson Mesa	LONEOS	·	2.0 km	MPC · JPL
89978	2002 TA_{27}	—	October 2, 2002	Socorro	LINEAR	KOR	2.9 km	MPC · JPL
89979	2002 TP_{27}	—	October 2, 2002	Socorro	LINEAR	PHO	2.4 km	MPC · JPL
89980	2002 TV_{27}	—	October 2, 2002	Socorro	LINEAR	·	6.7 km	MPC · JPL
89981	2002 TL_{30}	—	October 2, 2002	Socorro	LINEAR	·	4.8 km	MPC · JPL
89982	2002 TU_{35}	—	October 2, 2002	Socorro	LINEAR	MAS	1.4 km	MPC · JPL
89983	2002 TE_{36}	—	October 2, 2002	Socorro	LINEAR	·	4.2 km	MPC · JPL
89984	2002 TR_{38}	—	October 2, 2002	Socorro	LINEAR	·	1.9 km	MPC · JPL
89985	2002 TT_{41}	—	October 2, 2002	Socorro	LINEAR	KOR	2.9 km	MPC · JPL
89986	2002 TV_{45}	—	October 2, 2002	Socorro	LINEAR	·	1.9 km	MPC · JPL
89987	2002 TX_{48}	—	October 2, 2002	Socorro	LINEAR	·	2.8 km	MPC · JPL
89988	2002 TJ_{49}	—	October 2, 2002	Socorro	LINEAR	KOR	2.8 km	MPC · JPL
89989	2002 TV_{49}	—	October 2, 2002	Socorro	LINEAR	·	1.9 km	MPC · JPL
89990	2002 TP_{54}	—	October 2, 2002	Socorro	LINEAR	·	1.7 km	MPC · JPL
89991	2002 TC_{56}	—	October 1, 2002	Anderson Mesa	LONEOS	·	2.2 km	MPC · JPL
89992	2002 TS_{66}	—	October 5, 2002	Socorro	LINEAR	H	1.4 km	MPC · JPL
89993	2002 TV_{66}	—	October 6, 2002	Socorro	LINEAR	H	1.3 km	MPC · JPL
89994	2002 TK_{68}	—	October 8, 2002	Palomar	NEAT	PHO	2.2 km	MPC · JPL
89995	2002 TL_{72}	—	October 3, 2002	Palomar	NEAT	EOS	3.2 km	MPC · JPL
89996	2002 TK_{79}	—	October 1, 2002	Socorro	LINEAR	V	1.3 km	MPC · JPL
89997	2002 TO_{79}	—	October 1, 2002	Socorro	LINEAR	·	1.8 km	MPC · JPL
89998	2002 TN_{83}	—	October 2, 2002	Socorro	LINEAR	·	4.4 km	MPC · JPL
89999	2002 TU_{89}	—	October 3, 2002	Palomar	NEAT	HYG	6.3 km	MPC · JPL
90000	2002 TK_{102}	—	October 4, 2002	Socorro	LINEAR	EUN	2.9 km	MPC · JPL

back to top

== See also ==
- Meanings of minor-planet names: 89001–90000
