= Politico (album) =

Studio album by Mexican Institute of Sound
- Released: 14 August 2012
- Recorded: Mexico City
- Genre: Electronic
- Length: 39:10
- Label: Nacional Records
- Producer: Camilo Lara

Mexican Institute of Sound chronology
Soy Sauce (2009)	Politico (2012)	Disco Popular (2017)

Politico is Mexican Institute of Sound's fourth album. Released in August 2012, its theme is dedicated to Mexico's political and social environment; hence the name of the album.

Professional ratings
Review scores
Source	Rating
AllMusic	4.5/5 stars

== Track listing ==
1. Político
2. Especulando
3. Revolución
4. México
5. Es-Toy
6. Más!
7. Ceci N'Est Pas Automate
8. Se Baila Así
9. My Buddy @Julps
10. Tipo Raro
11. Ritmo Internacional
12. Cumbia Meguro
13. El Jefe

== Sources ==
- "Camilo Lara del IMS habla de su nuevo disco, 'Político'".
- "IMS estrena 'Político'". 12 June 2012.
