= Piñata (Mexican Institute of Sound album) =

Studio album by Mexican Institute of Sound
- Released: 2007
- Length: 50:46
- Label: Nacional Records
- Producer: Camilo Lara

Mexican Institute of Sound chronology
Méjico Máxico (2006)	Piñata (2007)	Soy Sauce (2009)

Piñata is the second full-length album from Mexican Institute of Sound. It has samples of Mexican and Latin American folk music.

Professional ratings
Review scores
Source	Rating
AllMusic	4/5 stars

== Track listing ==
1. Killer Kumbia
2. Escribeme Pronto ("Write Me Soon")
3. El Micrófono ("The Microphone")
4. Para No Vivir Desesperado ("To Not Live Desperately")
5. La Kebradita ("The Quebradita")
6. A Girl Like You
7. A Todos Ellos ("To All Them")
8. Hip Hop No Pares ("Hip Hop Don't Stop")
9. Katia, Tania, Paulina y la Kim
10. Belludita ("Hairy Little Girl")
11. Mi Negra a Bailal ("Let's Dance, My Black Little girl")
12. La la Meda ("The Grove")
13. La Kebradita (Le Hammond Inferno Mix by Holger)
14. La Paz la Luz (bonus track) ("The Peace, The Light")
15. Por Mi Raza Hablará el Espíritu (bonus track) ("For My Race, My Soul Will Speak")
16. Big Faint (ft. Kuase Nada) (bonus track)
