= Politics (disambiguation) =

Politics is the process observed in all human (and many non-human) group interactions by which groups make decisions, including activism on behalf of specific issues or causes.

Politics may also refer to:

== Film and television ==
- Politics (1931 film), an American comedy film
- Politics (2004 film), a stand-up show by Ricky Gervais
- "Politics" (Hustle), a 2009 television episode
- "Politics" (Stargate SG-1), a 1998 television episode
- Raajneeti (English: Politics), a 2010 Indian film

== Music ==
=== Albums ===
- Politics (Sébastien Tellier album), a 2004 album
- Politics (Yellowjackets album), a 1988 album

=== Songs ===
- "Politics" (Royce da 5'9" song), a 2005 song
- "Politics" (song), a 2006 song by Korn
- "Politics", a song from the EP Bad Religion

== Publications ==
=== Journals ===
- Politics (1940s magazine), an American politics magazine published by Dwight Macdonald in the 1940s
- Politics (academic journal), a British academic journal of the Political Studies Association
- Politics (trade magazine), a trade magazine, founded in 1980, renamed Campaigns & Elections
- Politics (Australian journal), an academic journal founded in 1966, renamed in 1990 as the Australian Journal of Political Science

=== Other publications ===
- Politics (Aristotle), a treatise on philosophy
- "Politics" (essay), an essay written by Ralph Waldo Emerson
- Politics (novel), a 2003 book by Adam Thirlwell
- "Politics" (poem), by William Butler Yeats

== See also ==
- "Political" (song), a song by Spirit of the West
- Political science
- Politics.co.uk
- Politix, an Australian men's clothing brand
- Workplace politics
