= Asiago-DLR Asteroid Survey =

Astronomical survey

- Observatory code: 209
- Website: dipastro.pd.astro.it/planets/adas/

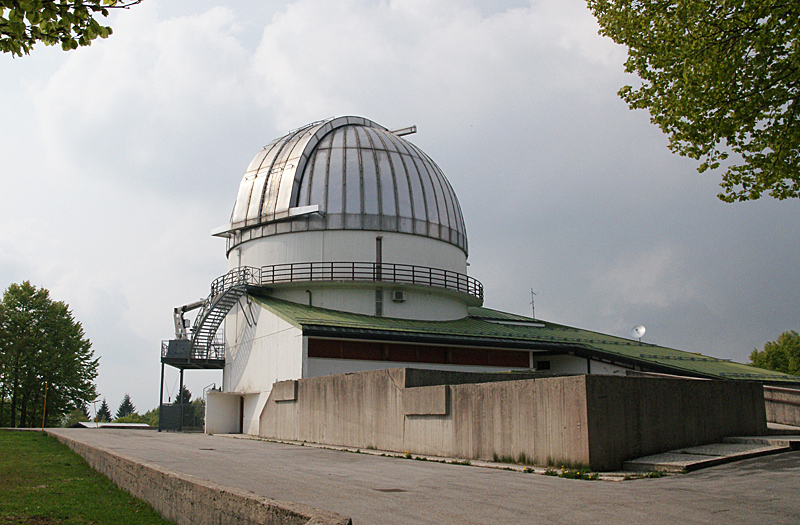
The Cima Ekar Observing Station, used by the asteroid survey project

Minor planets discovered: 208
see § List of discovered minor planets

The Asiago-DLR Asteroid Survey (ADAS; observatory code 209) was an astronomical survey conducted in the early 2000s to search for comets and asteroids, with special emphasis on near-Earth objects. The Minor Planet Center directly credits ADAS with the discovery of more than 200 minor planets after 2001.

== Description ==
It was a joint venture between the Department of Astronomy of the University of Padua (using the Schmidt telescope at the Cima Ekar Observing Station) and the German Aerospace Center's Institute of Space Sensor Technology and Planetary Exploration at Berlin-Adlershof, Germany. ADAS has IAU observatory code 209. Co-located with the Asiago Astrophysical Observatory, it conducted observations from 2001 to 2002. Principal investigators for the survey were Cesare Barbieri (at Padua/Asiago) and Gerhard Hahn (at DLR Berlin-Adlershof). The project worked in collaboration with the Uppsala-DLR Asteroid Survey (UDAS).

== List of discovered minor planets ==
important; height: 675px;
43511 Cima Ekar	11 February 2001	list
46392 Bertola	5 January 2002	list
(48268) 2002 AK_{1}	4 January 2002	list
51406 Massimocalvani	26 February 2001	list
(55427) 2001 TF_{47}	14 October 2001	list
55428 Cappellaro	14 October 2001	list
(57561) 2001 TA_{48}	14 October 2001	list
57879 Cesarechiosi	2 January 2002	list
(64840) 2001 YW_{5}	19 December 2001	list
65091 Saramagrin	1 February 2002	list
(68585) 2002 AY_{6}	9 January 2002	list
72543 Simonemarchi	26 February 2001	list
(77049) 2001 CH_{48}	1 February 2001	list
77136 Mendillo	26 February 2001	list
(82152) 2001 FR_{169}	23 March 2001	list
82153 Alemigliorini	23 March 2001	list
(83679) 2001 TB_{48}	14 October 2001	list
83956 Panuzzo	7 December 2001	list
(88245) 2001 CH_{49}	2 February 2001	list
88961 Valpertile	14 October 2001	list
(89663) 2001 YN_{5}	17 December 2001	list
89664 Pignata	19 December 2001	list
(89665) 2001 YO_{6}	20 December 2001	list
89739 Rampazzi	9 January 2002	list
(89744) 2002 AG_{18}	8 January 2002	list

important; height: 675px;
89818 Jureskvarč	2 January 2002	list
(89910) 2002 ED_{5}	10 March 2002	list
90288 Dalleave	6 March 2003	list
(94955) 2001 YS_{90}	21 December 2001	list
95008 Ivanobertini	4 January 2002	list
(95009) 2002 AJ_{1}	4 January 2002	list
95024 Ericaellingson	8 January 2002	list
(95209) 2002 CW	2 February 2002	list
95474 Andreajbarbieri	10 March 2002	list
(95475) 2002 EB_{5}	10 March 2002	list
98866 Giannabussolari	15 January 2001	list
(99439) 2002 CA_{1}	2 February 2002	list
107393 Bernacca	1 February 2001	list
(107394) 2001 CJ_{49}	2 February 2001	list
108072 Odifreddi	22 March 2001	list
(108108) 2001 FA_{192}	22 March 2001	list
111561 Giovanniallevi	5 January 2002	list
(111562) 2002 AJ_{3}	5 January 2002	list
(111567) 2002 AT_{6}	5 January 2002	list
(111820) 2002 DK_{1}	18 February 2002	list
(123859) 2001 CO_{48}	11 February 2001	list
(123923) 2001 DQ_{106}	27 February 2001	list
(124891) 2001 TE_{47}	14 October 2001	list
(126424) 2002 CR	2 February 2002	list
(126776) 2002 EJ_{3}	7 March 2002	list

important; height: 675px;
(126777) 2002 EN_{3}	7 March 2002	list
(126778) 2002 EV_{3}	10 March 2002	list
(132162) 2002 EJ_{8}	7 March 2002	list
(132265) 2002 EW_{125}	11 March 2002	list
(140382) 2001 TV_{47}	14 October 2001	list
(141249) 2001 YP_{5}	17 December 2001	list
(141250) 2001 YP_{6}	20 December 2001	list
(141339) 2002 AZ_{4}	5 January 2002	list
(141341) 2002 AZ_{6}	9 January 2002	list
(146829) 2002 AB_{5}	9 January 2002	list
(146940) 2002 EY_{4}	10 March 2002	list
(146941) 2002 EC_{5}	10 March 2002	list
(147375) 2003 EH_{5}	4 March 2003	list
(151368) 2002 ET_{3}	10 March 2002	list
(151369) 2002 EB_{4}	10 March 2002	list
(151370) 2002 EF_{5}	10 March 2002	list
(151417) 2002 EA_{146}	13 March 2002	list
(153914) 2001 XV_{248}	14 December 2001	list
(153956) 2002 AG_{27}	12 January 2002	list
(154014) 2002 BC_{28}	18 January 2002	list
(154103) 2002 EX_{3}	10 March 2002	list
(154104) 2002 EG_{4}	10 March 2002	list
(154105) 2002 EW_{4}	10 March 2002	list
(154106) 2002 EK_{8}	7 March 2002	list
(156401) 2002 AK_{3}	5 January 2002	list

important; height: 675px;
(156549) 2002 EY_{3}	10 March 2002	list
(158244) 2001 TL_{47}	14 October 2001	list
(158478) 2002 DJ_{1}	18 February 2002	list
(158486) 2002 EM_{8}	10 March 2002	list
(158487) 2002 EN_{8}	11 March 2002	list
(162891) 2001 FS_{169}	23 March 2001	list
(163188) 2002 ES_{4}	10 March 2002	list
(163239) 2002 EU_{156}	10 March 2002	list
(166144) 2002 EO_{3}	7 March 2002	list
(166145) 2002 EH_{5}	10 March 2002	list
(174065) 2002 EH_{4}	10 March 2002	list
(176533) 2002 AP_{6}	5 January 2002	list
(179540) 2002 CY_{253}	4 February 2002	list
(182790) 2002 AJ_{18}	8 January 2002	list
(182833) 2002 CG_{1}	2 February 2002	list
(182897) 2002 EZ_{3}	10 March 2002	list
(186274) 2002 AY_{4}	3 January 2002	list
(188097) 2001 YM_{6}	20 December 2001	list
(188123) 2002 CT	2 February 2002	list
(194733) 2001 YH_{5}	17 December 2001	list
(194979) 2002 AE_{203}	11 January 2002	list
(195230) 2002 ER_{4}	10 March 2002	list
(195231) 2002 EU_{4}	10 March 2002	list
(205577) 2001 TO_{47}	14 October 2001	list
(205601) 2001 TY_{256}	14 October 2001	list

important; height: 675px;
(208429) 2001 TM_{47}	14 October 2001	list
(208527) 2001 XX_{248}	15 December 2001	list
(208610) 2002 CB_{254}	4 February 2002	list
(208618) 2002 EX_{4}	10 March 2002	list
(211079) 2002 EL_{8}	7 March 2002	list
(213417) 2001 XZ_{30}	7 December 2001	list
(213436) 2001 YN_{6}	20 December 2001	list
(213441) 2002 AU_{6}	5 January 2002	list
(216573) 2002 CJ_{253}	3 February 2002	list
(218055) 2002 EF_{4}	10 March 2002	list
(219879) 2002 ET_{4}	10 March 2002	list
(219880) 2002 EO_{8}	11 March 2002	list
(222511) 2001 TX_{47}	14 October 2001	list
(230298) 2002 AE_{18}	8 January 2002	list
(232137) 2002 CE_{1}	2 February 2002	list
(232417) 2003 EU_{17}	6 March 2003	list
(234349) 2001 FT_{167}	19 March 2001	list
(234630) 2002 CD_{1}	2 February 2002	list
(234654) 2002 EP_{8}	11 March 2002	list
(240007) 2001 TQ_{47}	14 October 2001	list
(240122) 2002 ED_{156}	11 March 2002	list
(244053) 2001 TJ_{47}	14 October 2001	list
(244270) 2002 DN_{1}	18 February 2002	list
(247436) 2002 ES_{3}	10 March 2002	list
(252208) 2001 FP_{168}	22 March 2001	list

important; height: 675px;
(252665) 2002 AG_{1}	4 January 2002	list
(252666) 2002 AE_{7}	9 January 2002	list
(252687) 2002 AA_{204}	5 January 2002	list
(252693) 2002 CQ	2 February 2002	list
(252744) 2002 EL_{3}	7 March 2002	list
(252745) 2002 EV_{4}	10 March 2002	list
(252781) 2002 EW_{129}	11 March 2002	list
(258540) 2002 CD_{16}	4 February 2002	list
(258604) 2002 CK_{253}	3 February 2002	list
(264645) 2001 XV_{30}	7 December 2001	list
(264711) 2002 AQ_{203}	10 January 2002	list
(264757) 2002 EM_{3}	7 March 2002	list
(267447) 2002 DP_{1}	18 February 2002	list
(267725) 2003 EV_{17}	6 March 2003	list
(275889) 2001 TW_{47}	14 October 2001	list
(276018) 2002 AD_{7}	9 January 2002	list
(279442) 2010 RR_{14}	14 October 2001	list
(282225) 2001 YB_{162}	19 December 2001	list
(283519) 2001 TP_{47}	14 October 2001	list
(283520) 2001 TU_{47}	14 October 2001	list
(283633) 2002 EG_{5}	10 March 2002	list
(286096) 2001 TR_{47}	14 October 2001	list
(286622) 2002 EW_{3}	10 March 2002	list
(297803) 2002 AH_{7}	9 January 2002	list
(302435) 2002 DD_{19}	18 February 2002	list

important; height: 675px;
(307063) 2002 AE_{1}	2 January 2002	list
(310222) 2011 SR_{214}	10 January 2002	list
(310652) 2002 CX_{316}	10 January 2002	list
(310653) 2002 DM_{1}	18 February 2002	list
(310657) 2002 EA_{4}	10 March 2002	list
(316527) 2010 VW_{201}	26 February 2001	list
(317208) 2002 CE_{16}	10 February 2002	list
(322577) 2012 AF_{7}	22 March 2001	list
(329025) 2011 AX_{18}	16 February 2001	list
(329410) 2002 EX_{155}	10 March 2002	list
(331341) 2012 BL_{102}	19 February 2002	list
(331371) 2012 DR_{53}	16 February 2001	list
(337613) 2001 TG_{47}	14 October 2001	list
(337614) 2001 TY_{47}	14 October 2001	list
(344400) 2002 AA_{7}	9 January 2002	list
(353677) 2011 UV_{235}	18 January 2002	list
(354202) 2002 EF_{120}	10 March 2002	list
(356214) 2009 RN_{73}	14 February 2001	list
(356916) 2012 BH_{61}	16 February 2001	list
(357147) 2002 CS	2 February 2002	list
(357148) 2002 CZ	2 February 2002	list
(360393) 2002 EE_{5}	10 March 2002	list
(360398) 2002 EH_{156}	10 March 2002	list
(360399) 2002 EX_{156}	10 March 2002	list
(363263) 2002 EN_{4}	10 March 2002	list

important; height: 675px;
(370196) 2002 CZ_{253}	4 February 2002	list
(370198) 2002 CL_{314}	12 February 2002	list
(376946) 2002 EC_{4}	10 March 2002	list
(379732) 2011 GY_{54}	8 January 2002	list
(379767) 2011 HH_{20}	23 March 2001	list
(382531) 2001 TK_{47}	14 October 2001	list
(386897) 2011 GW_{84}	23 March 2001	list
(392551) 2011 SM_{44}	18 January 2002	list
(392801) 2012 TS_{197}	26 February 2001	list
(399442) 2002 CB_{1}	2 February 2002	list
(405113) 2002 ED_{4}	10 March 2002	list
(412221) 2013 GT_{121}	10 March 2002	list
(420499) 2012 FW_{15}	16 February 2001	list
(421431) 2014 CU_{22}	27 February 2001	list
(421564) 2014 OS_{190}	16 October 2001	list
(422398) 2014 SF_{279}	11 March 2002	list
(422820) 2002 CP	2 February 2002	list
(423666) 2005 YJ_{138}	18 January 2002	list
(425985) 2011 HO_{77}	10 March 2002	list
(427461) 2001 TT_{47}	14 October 2001	list
(446074) 2013 CV_{162}	10 March 2002	list
(446329) 2014 FP_{64}	27 February 2001	list
(454070) 2012 SH_{65}	22 March 2001	list
(456207) 2006 JA_{32}	19 February 2002	list
(461410) 2001 TS_{47}	14 October 2001	list

important;
(467427) 2005 VG_{91}	18 January 2002	list
(469434) 2002 DO_{1}	18 February 2002	list
(471270) 2011 FU_{3}	10 January 2002	list
(471517) 2012 DX_{74}	10 March 2002	list
(472336) 2015 AF_{230}	18 January 2002	list
(474228) 2001 DK_{108}	26 February 2001	list
(474328) 2002 EK_{4}	10 March 2002	list
(480884) 2002 AN_{7}	9 January 2002	list
Discoveries are credited by the MPC with "ADAS" and "Asiago-DLR Asteroid Survey"

== See also ==
- Cima Ekar Observing Station
- List of asteroid-discovering observatories
- List of minor planet discoverers § Discovering dedicated institutions
- List of observatory codes § 209
- List of near-Earth object observation projects
