= List of minor planets: 252001–253000 =

The following is a partial list of minor planets, running from minor-planet number 252001 through 253000, inclusive. The primary data for this and other partial lists is based on JPL's "Small-Body Orbital Elements" and data available from the Minor Planet Center. Critical list information is also provided by the MPC, unless otherwise specified from Lowell Observatory. A detailed description of the table's columns and additional sources are given on the main page including a complete list of every page in this series, and a statistical break-up on the dynamical classification of minor planets.

Also see the summary list of all named bodies in numerical and alphabetical order, and the corresponding naming citations for the number range of this particular list. New namings may only be added to this list after official publication, as the preannouncement of names is condemned by the Working Group for Small Bodies Nomenclature of the International Astronomical Union.

Near-Earth obj.	MBA (inner)	MBA (outer)	Centaur
Mars-crosser	MBA (middle)	Jupiter trojan	Trans-Neptunian obj.
Unclassified

== 252001–252100 ==
Designation			Discovery			Properties		Ref
Permanent	Provisional	Named after	Date	Site	Discoverer(s)	Category	Diam.	Ref
252001	2000 EO_{149}	—	March 5, 2000	Socorro	LINEAR	·	1.6 km	MPC · JPL
252002	2000 EU_{170}	—	March 5, 2000	Socorro	LINEAR	CYB · 2:1J (unstable)	7.5 km	MPC · JPL
252003	2000 EM_{199}	—	March 3, 2000	Socorro	LINEAR	·	1.3 km	MPC · JPL
252004	2000 FR_{2}	—	March 26, 2000	Socorro	LINEAR	PHO	2.3 km	MPC · JPL
252005	2000 FN_{9}	—	March 30, 2000	Kitt Peak	Spacewatch	·	1.7 km	MPC · JPL
252006	2000 FC_{10}	—	March 30, 2000	Kitt Peak	Spacewatch	·	1.8 km	MPC · JPL
252007	2000 FU_{54}	—	March 30, 2000	Kitt Peak	Spacewatch	·	1.6 km	MPC · JPL
252008	2000 GZ_{14}	—	April 5, 2000	Socorro	LINEAR	EUN	1.9 km	MPC · JPL
252009	2000 GS_{19}	—	April 5, 2000	Socorro	LINEAR	EUN	1.5 km	MPC · JPL
252010	2000 GY_{34}	—	April 5, 2000	Socorro	LINEAR	·	2.4 km	MPC · JPL
252011	2000 GY_{44}	—	April 5, 2000	Socorro	LINEAR	JUN	1.5 km	MPC · JPL
252012	2000 GC_{63}	—	April 5, 2000	Socorro	LINEAR	·	2.1 km	MPC · JPL
252013	2000 GP_{114}	—	April 7, 2000	Socorro	LINEAR	·	2.2 km	MPC · JPL
252014	2000 GN_{160}	—	April 7, 2000	Socorro	LINEAR	EUN	1.7 km	MPC · JPL
252015	2000 HG_{18}	—	April 24, 2000	Kitt Peak	Spacewatch	·	2.3 km	MPC · JPL
252016	2000 HD_{60}	—	April 25, 2000	Anderson Mesa	LONEOS	·	1.4 km	MPC · JPL
252017	2000 HA_{67}	—	April 27, 2000	Anderson Mesa	LONEOS	RAF	1.3 km	MPC · JPL
252018	2000 HP_{67}	—	April 27, 2000	Anderson Mesa	LONEOS	·	2.1 km	MPC · JPL
252019	2000 HV_{71}	—	April 25, 2000	Anderson Mesa	LONEOS	·	2.6 km	MPC · JPL
252020	2000 HD_{83}	—	April 29, 2000	Socorro	LINEAR	·	2.1 km	MPC · JPL
252021	2000 HJ_{87}	—	April 30, 2000	Haleakala	NEAT	·	2.1 km	MPC · JPL
252022	2000 JQ_{9}	—	May 3, 2000	Socorro	LINEAR	·	1.8 km	MPC · JPL
252023	2000 JK_{90}	—	May 4, 2000	Apache Point	SDSS	·	2.4 km	MPC · JPL
252024	2000 KS	—	May 25, 2000	Prescott	P. G. Comba	·	3.0 km	MPC · JPL
252025	2000 KW_{15}	—	May 28, 2000	Socorro	LINEAR	·	2.6 km	MPC · JPL
252026	2000 KC_{19}	—	May 28, 2000	Socorro	LINEAR	·	2.8 km	MPC · JPL
252027	2000 KW_{37}	—	May 24, 2000	Kitt Peak	Spacewatch	ADE	3.7 km	MPC · JPL
252028	2000 KG_{82}	—	May 24, 2000	Kitt Peak	Spacewatch	·	2.4 km	MPC · JPL
252029	2000 NG_{7}	—	July 4, 2000	Kitt Peak	Spacewatch	DOR	3.1 km	MPC · JPL
252030	2000 OM_{57}	—	July 29, 2000	Anderson Mesa	LONEOS	·	1.0 km	MPC · JPL
252031	2000 OM_{58}	—	July 29, 2000	Anderson Mesa	LONEOS	GEF	1.9 km	MPC · JPL
252032	2000 OW_{63}	—	July 31, 2000	Cerro Tololo	M. W. Buie	·	1.9 km	MPC · JPL
252033	2000 QM_{19}	—	August 24, 2000	Socorro	LINEAR	·	860 m	MPC · JPL
252034	2000 QZ_{39}	—	August 24, 2000	Socorro	LINEAR	·	2.4 km	MPC · JPL
252035	2000 QC_{54}	—	August 25, 2000	Socorro	LINEAR	·	2.7 km	MPC · JPL
252036	2000 QX_{72}	—	August 24, 2000	Socorro	LINEAR	·	750 m	MPC · JPL
252037	2000 QW_{109}	—	August 30, 2000	Bergisch Gladbach	W. Bickel	·	2.0 km	MPC · JPL
252038	2000 QR_{117}	—	August 31, 2000	Socorro	LINEAR	H	490 m	MPC · JPL
252039	2000 QA_{120}	—	August 25, 2000	Socorro	LINEAR	·	890 m	MPC · JPL
252040	2000 QG_{125}	—	August 31, 2000	Socorro	LINEAR	·	1.2 km	MPC · JPL
252041	2000 QP_{175}	—	August 31, 2000	Socorro	LINEAR	·	2.7 km	MPC · JPL
252042	2000 QA_{217}	—	August 31, 2000	Socorro	LINEAR	·	1.2 km	MPC · JPL
252043	2000 QB_{223}	—	August 21, 2000	Anderson Mesa	LONEOS	·	910 m	MPC · JPL
252044	2000 QM_{240}	—	August 25, 2000	Cerro Tololo	M. W. Buie	·	2.2 km	MPC · JPL
252045	2000 RM_{15}	—	September 1, 2000	Socorro	LINEAR	·	5.0 km	MPC · JPL
252046	2000 RP_{24}	—	September 1, 2000	Socorro	LINEAR	·	1.2 km	MPC · JPL
252047	2000 RU_{89}	—	September 3, 2000	Socorro	LINEAR	·	2.1 km	MPC · JPL
252048	2000 RU_{90}	—	September 3, 2000	Socorro	LINEAR	·	840 m	MPC · JPL
252049	2000 SS_{10}	—	September 24, 2000	Prescott	P. G. Comba	·	830 m	MPC · JPL
252050	2000 SZ_{10}	—	September 22, 2000	Socorro	LINEAR	·	770 m	MPC · JPL
252051	2000 SA_{13}	—	September 21, 2000	Socorro	LINEAR	·	810 m	MPC · JPL
252052	2000 SF_{17}	—	September 23, 2000	Socorro	LINEAR	(16286)	3.0 km	MPC · JPL
252053	2000 SN_{17}	—	September 23, 2000	Socorro	LINEAR	·	1.1 km	MPC · JPL
252054	2000 SV_{18}	—	September 23, 2000	Socorro	LINEAR	·	1.1 km	MPC · JPL
252055	2000 SD_{29}	—	September 24, 2000	Socorro	LINEAR	·	2.8 km	MPC · JPL
252056	2000 SL_{36}	—	September 24, 2000	Socorro	LINEAR	·	2.6 km	MPC · JPL
252057	2000 SR_{41}	—	September 24, 2000	Socorro	LINEAR	·	1 km	MPC · JPL
252058	2000 SE_{51}	—	September 23, 2000	Socorro	LINEAR	·	1.1 km	MPC · JPL
252059	2000 SD_{53}	—	September 24, 2000	Socorro	LINEAR	·	2.2 km	MPC · JPL
252060	2000 SP_{54}	—	September 24, 2000	Socorro	LINEAR	·	2.5 km	MPC · JPL
252061	2000 SV_{81}	—	September 24, 2000	Socorro	LINEAR	·	1.0 km	MPC · JPL
252062	2000 SX_{93}	—	September 23, 2000	Socorro	LINEAR	·	1.1 km	MPC · JPL
252063	2000 SC_{96}	—	September 23, 2000	Socorro	LINEAR	·	1.0 km	MPC · JPL
252064	2000 SX_{127}	—	September 24, 2000	Socorro	LINEAR	·	920 m	MPC · JPL
252065	2000 SY_{128}	—	September 25, 2000	Socorro	LINEAR	·	2.7 km	MPC · JPL
252066	2000 ST_{139}	—	September 23, 2000	Socorro	LINEAR	·	1.2 km	MPC · JPL
252067	2000 SD_{141}	—	September 23, 2000	Socorro	LINEAR	·	1.1 km	MPC · JPL
252068	2000 SW_{149}	—	September 24, 2000	Socorro	LINEAR	·	1.0 km	MPC · JPL
252069	2000 SR_{164}	—	September 27, 2000	Socorro	LINEAR	PHO	2.6 km	MPC · JPL
252070	2000 SN_{196}	—	September 24, 2000	Socorro	LINEAR	·	870 m	MPC · JPL
252071	2000 SM_{208}	—	September 25, 2000	Socorro	LINEAR	·	1.1 km	MPC · JPL
252072	2000 SU_{234}	—	September 24, 2000	Socorro	LINEAR	·	930 m	MPC · JPL
252073	2000 SR_{236}	—	September 24, 2000	Socorro	LINEAR	·	960 m	MPC · JPL
252074	2000 SR_{238}	—	September 26, 2000	Socorro	LINEAR	·	1.3 km	MPC · JPL
252075	2000 SQ_{248}	—	September 24, 2000	Socorro	LINEAR	·	900 m	MPC · JPL
252076	2000 SL_{284}	—	September 23, 2000	Socorro	LINEAR	·	1.1 km	MPC · JPL
252077	2000 SC_{286}	—	September 24, 2000	Socorro	LINEAR	KOR	1.7 km	MPC · JPL
252078	2000 SM_{291}	—	September 27, 2000	Socorro	LINEAR	·	900 m	MPC · JPL
252079	2000 SY_{306}	—	September 30, 2000	Socorro	LINEAR	slow	1.1 km	MPC · JPL
252080	2000 SF_{338}	—	September 25, 2000	Kitt Peak	Spacewatch	·	2.4 km	MPC · JPL
252081	2000 SD_{342}	—	September 24, 2000	Socorro	LINEAR	·	810 m	MPC · JPL
252082	2000 SH_{370}	—	September 24, 2000	Anderson Mesa	LONEOS	DOR	4.1 km	MPC · JPL
252083	2000 TV_{8}	—	October 1, 2000	Socorro	LINEAR	·	600 m	MPC · JPL
252084	2000 TR_{17}	—	October 1, 2000	Socorro	LINEAR	·	1.0 km	MPC · JPL
252085	2000 TZ_{37}	—	October 1, 2000	Socorro	LINEAR	·	4.4 km	MPC · JPL
252086	2000 TZ_{51}	—	October 1, 2000	Socorro	LINEAR	KOR	1.7 km	MPC · JPL
252087	2000 UK_{3}	—	October 24, 2000	Socorro	LINEAR	·	1.4 km	MPC · JPL
252088	2000 UG_{28}	—	October 25, 2000	Socorro	LINEAR	·	1.1 km	MPC · JPL
252089	2000 UQ_{29}	—	October 24, 2000	Socorro	LINEAR	PHO	1.6 km	MPC · JPL
252090	2000 UZ_{29}	—	October 25, 2000	Socorro	LINEAR	·	1.1 km	MPC · JPL
252091	2000 UP_{30}	—	October 30, 2000	Socorro	LINEAR	APO +1km	1.3 km	MPC · JPL
252092	2000 UL_{34}	—	October 24, 2000	Socorro	LINEAR	·	1.5 km	MPC · JPL
252093	2000 UN_{36}	—	October 24, 2000	Socorro	LINEAR	·	900 m	MPC · JPL
252094	2000 UB_{51}	—	October 24, 2000	Socorro	LINEAR	·	1.0 km	MPC · JPL
252095	2000 UX_{58}	—	October 25, 2000	Socorro	LINEAR	·	1.2 km	MPC · JPL
252096	2000 UK_{67}	—	October 25, 2000	Socorro	LINEAR	·	840 m	MPC · JPL
252097	2000 UW_{71}	—	October 25, 2000	Socorro	LINEAR	·	1.2 km	MPC · JPL
252098	2000 UT_{91}	—	October 25, 2000	Socorro	LINEAR	·	2.8 km	MPC · JPL
252099	2000 UP_{92}	—	October 25, 2000	Socorro	LINEAR	·	940 m	MPC · JPL
252100	2000 UP_{95}	—	October 25, 2000	Socorro	LINEAR	EOS	2.7 km	MPC · JPL

== 252101–252200 ==
back to top

Designation			Discovery			Properties		Ref
Permanent	Provisional	Named after	Date	Site	Discoverer(s)	Category	Diam.	Ref
252101	2000 VV_{5}	—	November 1, 2000	Socorro	LINEAR	·	2.6 km	MPC · JPL
252102	2000 VF_{10}	—	November 1, 2000	Socorro	LINEAR	·	860 m	MPC · JPL
252103	2000 VN_{40}	—	November 1, 2000	Socorro	LINEAR	·	2.2 km	MPC · JPL
252104	2000 VD_{53}	—	November 3, 2000	Socorro	LINEAR	·	1.1 km	MPC · JPL
252105	2000 VU_{55}	—	November 3, 2000	Socorro	LINEAR	·	4.2 km	MPC · JPL
252106	2000 WC_{8}	—	November 20, 2000	Socorro	LINEAR	·	1.1 km	MPC · JPL
252107	2000 WC_{11}	—	November 24, 2000	Bisei SG Center	BATTeRS	·	3.1 km	MPC · JPL
252108	2000 WU_{17}	—	November 21, 2000	Socorro	LINEAR	·	3.0 km	MPC · JPL
252109	2000 WB_{19}	—	November 21, 2000	Socorro	LINEAR	·	1.4 km	MPC · JPL
252110	2000 WR_{20}	—	November 25, 2000	Kitt Peak	Spacewatch	·	3.0 km	MPC · JPL
252111	2000 WB_{24}	—	November 20, 2000	Socorro	LINEAR	·	2.7 km	MPC · JPL
252112	2000 WU_{26}	—	November 25, 2000	Socorro	LINEAR	(2076)	1.2 km	MPC · JPL
252113	2000 WT_{35}	—	November 20, 2000	Socorro	LINEAR	·	2.9 km	MPC · JPL
252114	2000 WQ_{37}	—	November 20, 2000	Socorro	LINEAR	·	1.1 km	MPC · JPL
252115	2000 WG_{45}	—	November 21, 2000	Socorro	LINEAR	·	990 m	MPC · JPL
252116	2000 WD_{46}	—	November 21, 2000	Socorro	LINEAR	·	1.1 km	MPC · JPL
252117	2000 WA_{55}	—	November 20, 2000	Socorro	LINEAR	PHO	1.7 km	MPC · JPL
252118	2000 WU_{65}	—	November 28, 2000	Kitt Peak	Spacewatch	·	2.2 km	MPC · JPL
252119	2000 WS_{74}	—	November 20, 2000	Socorro	LINEAR	·	2.8 km	MPC · JPL
252120	2000 WM_{76}	—	November 20, 2000	Socorro	LINEAR	·	900 m	MPC · JPL
252121	2000 WR_{94}	—	November 21, 2000	Socorro	LINEAR	·	2.7 km	MPC · JPL
252122	2000 WB_{107}	—	November 28, 2000	Socorro	LINEAR	PHO	1.8 km	MPC · JPL
252123	2000 WU_{118}	—	November 20, 2000	Socorro	LINEAR	EOS	2.8 km	MPC · JPL
252124	2000 WG_{127}	—	November 17, 2000	Kitt Peak	Spacewatch	·	3.5 km	MPC · JPL
252125	2000 WK_{147}	—	November 27, 2000	Kitt Peak	Spacewatch	·	1.1 km	MPC · JPL
252126	2000 WX_{155}	—	November 30, 2000	Socorro	LINEAR	·	2.4 km	MPC · JPL
252127	2000 WN_{173}	—	November 25, 2000	Socorro	LINEAR	PHO	2.3 km	MPC · JPL
252128	2000 XC_{14}	—	December 4, 2000	Bohyunsan	Jeon, Y.-B., Lee, B.-C.	·	1.1 km	MPC · JPL
252129	2000 XZ_{29}	—	December 4, 2000	Socorro	LINEAR	·	5.0 km	MPC · JPL
252130	2000 XG_{52}	—	December 6, 2000	Socorro	LINEAR	·	3.2 km	MPC · JPL
252131	2000 XD_{54}	—	December 4, 2000	Uccle	T. Pauwels	·	5.3 km	MPC · JPL
252132	2000 YU_{8}	—	December 20, 2000	Kitt Peak	Spacewatch	·	4.2 km	MPC · JPL
252133	2000 YZ_{8}	—	December 21, 2000	Kitt Peak	Spacewatch	H	760 m	MPC · JPL
252134	2000 YR_{13}	—	December 22, 2000	Kitt Peak	Spacewatch	·	3.0 km	MPC · JPL
252135	2000 YE_{19}	—	December 21, 2000	Kitt Peak	Spacewatch	·	2.0 km	MPC · JPL
252136	2000 YG_{33}	—	December 28, 2000	Kitt Peak	Spacewatch	·	770 m	MPC · JPL
252137	2000 YA_{37}	—	December 30, 2000	Socorro	LINEAR	·	5.3 km	MPC · JPL
252138	2000 YW_{43}	—	December 30, 2000	Socorro	LINEAR	·	5.1 km	MPC · JPL
252139	2000 YX_{47}	—	December 30, 2000	Socorro	LINEAR	EOS	3.6 km	MPC · JPL
252140	2000 YK_{101}	—	December 28, 2000	Socorro	LINEAR	·	4.3 km	MPC · JPL
252141	2000 YW_{106}	—	December 30, 2000	Socorro	LINEAR	TIR	4.5 km	MPC · JPL
252142	2000 YA_{127}	—	December 29, 2000	Anderson Mesa	LONEOS	·	4.2 km	MPC · JPL
252143	2000 YK_{141}	—	December 20, 2000	Kitt Peak	Deep Lens Survey	·	2.2 km	MPC · JPL
252144	2001 AR_{33}	—	January 4, 2001	Socorro	LINEAR	·	1.3 km	MPC · JPL
252145	2001 AV_{46}	—	January 15, 2001	Socorro	LINEAR	H	660 m	MPC · JPL
252146	2001 AE_{50}	—	January 6, 2001	Socorro	LINEAR	H	780 m	MPC · JPL
252147	2001 BP	—	January 17, 2001	Oizumi	T. Kobayashi	HYG	4.8 km	MPC · JPL
252148	2001 BQ_{1}	—	January 16, 2001	Kitt Peak	Spacewatch	·	850 m	MPC · JPL
252149	2001 BQ_{7}	—	January 19, 2001	Socorro	LINEAR	·	3.6 km	MPC · JPL
252150	2001 BT_{10}	—	January 20, 2001	Socorro	LINEAR	·	1.3 km	MPC · JPL
252151	2001 BZ_{14}	—	January 21, 2001	Oizumi	T. Kobayashi	·	3.0 km	MPC · JPL
252152	2001 BJ_{17}	—	January 19, 2001	Socorro	LINEAR	·	3.8 km	MPC · JPL
252153	2001 BT_{17}	—	January 19, 2001	Socorro	LINEAR	·	1.3 km	MPC · JPL
252154	2001 BU_{27}	—	January 20, 2001	Socorro	LINEAR	·	3.0 km	MPC · JPL
252155	2001 BT_{46}	—	January 21, 2001	Socorro	LINEAR	EOS	2.7 km	MPC · JPL
252156	2001 BJ_{51}	—	January 16, 2001	Uccle	T. Pauwels	·	1.1 km	MPC · JPL
252157	2001 BU_{54}	—	January 18, 2001	Haleakala	NEAT	·	1.7 km	MPC · JPL
252158	2001 CC_{7}	—	February 1, 2001	Socorro	LINEAR	NYS	1.7 km	MPC · JPL
252159	2001 CN_{10}	—	February 1, 2001	Socorro	LINEAR	L4	20 km	MPC · JPL
252160	2001 CN_{20}	—	February 3, 2001	Socorro	LINEAR	H	750 m	MPC · JPL
252161	2001 CQ_{22}	—	February 1, 2001	Anderson Mesa	LONEOS	·	3.9 km	MPC · JPL
252162	2001 CN_{23}	—	February 1, 2001	Anderson Mesa	LONEOS	·	1.2 km	MPC · JPL
252163	2001 CM_{31}	—	February 12, 2001	Prescott	P. G. Comba	MAS	790 m	MPC · JPL
252164	2001 CU_{31}	—	February 5, 2001	Socorro	LINEAR	PHO	1.7 km	MPC · JPL
252165	2001 CS_{34}	—	February 13, 2001	Socorro	LINEAR	·	3.9 km	MPC · JPL
252166	2001 CP_{35}	—	February 3, 2001	Socorro	LINEAR	H	930 m	MPC · JPL
252167	2001 CF_{37}	—	February 15, 2001	Nogales	Tenagra II	·	1.2 km	MPC · JPL
252168	2001 CC_{42}	—	February 15, 2001	Socorro	LINEAR	·	7.3 km	MPC · JPL
252169	2001 DH_{2}	—	February 16, 2001	Kitt Peak	Spacewatch	HYG	4.3 km	MPC · JPL
252170	2001 DN_{3}	—	February 16, 2001	Socorro	LINEAR	·	5.1 km	MPC · JPL
252171	2001 DD_{9}	—	February 17, 2001	Socorro	LINEAR	H	670 m	MPC · JPL
252172	2001 DG_{10}	—	February 17, 2001	Socorro	LINEAR	·	1.4 km	MPC · JPL
252173	2001 DL_{10}	—	February 17, 2001	Socorro	LINEAR	L4	20 km	MPC · JPL
252174	2001 DM_{15}	—	February 16, 2001	Socorro	LINEAR	·	1.5 km	MPC · JPL
252175	2001 DH_{21}	—	February 16, 2001	Socorro	LINEAR	·	4.5 km	MPC · JPL
252176	2001 DA_{22}	—	February 16, 2001	Socorro	LINEAR	LIX	6.8 km	MPC · JPL
252177	2001 DE_{29}	—	February 17, 2001	Socorro	LINEAR	NYS	1.7 km	MPC · JPL
252178	2001 DM_{59}	—	February 17, 2001	Socorro	LINEAR	·	6.1 km	MPC · JPL
252179	2001 DN_{60}	—	February 19, 2001	Socorro	LINEAR	L4	10 km	MPC · JPL
252180	2001 DH_{76}	—	February 20, 2001	Socorro	LINEAR	·	1.4 km	MPC · JPL
252181	2001 DW_{80}	—	February 22, 2001	Nogales	Tenagra II	·	3.8 km	MPC · JPL
252182	2001 DU_{81}	—	February 21, 2001	Kitt Peak	Spacewatch	·	3.1 km	MPC · JPL
252183	2001 DS_{90}	—	February 21, 2001	Kitt Peak	Spacewatch	THM	3.8 km	MPC · JPL
252184	2001 DD_{91}	—	February 20, 2001	Socorro	LINEAR	V	840 m	MPC · JPL
252185	2001 DD_{92}	—	February 20, 2001	Haleakala	NEAT	·	1.7 km	MPC · JPL
252186	2001 DG_{106}	—	February 21, 2001	Kitt Peak	Spacewatch	·	4.9 km	MPC · JPL
252187	2001 ER_{1}	—	March 1, 2001	Socorro	LINEAR	·	1.1 km	MPC · JPL
252188	2001 EJ_{4}	—	March 2, 2001	Anderson Mesa	LONEOS	·	3.0 km	MPC · JPL
252189	2001 EJ_{14}	—	March 15, 2001	Socorro	LINEAR	·	4.8 km	MPC · JPL
252190	2001 EM_{17}	—	March 15, 2001	Socorro	LINEAR	PHO	1.7 km	MPC · JPL
252191	2001 EY_{20}	—	March 15, 2001	Anderson Mesa	LONEOS	·	1.1 km	MPC · JPL
252192	2001 FJ_{1}	—	March 18, 2001	Socorro	LINEAR	·	1.3 km	MPC · JPL
252193	2001 FB_{9}	—	March 20, 2001	Haleakala	NEAT	H	750 m	MPC · JPL
252194	2001 FX_{18}	—	March 19, 2001	Anderson Mesa	LONEOS	NYS	1.7 km	MPC · JPL
252195	2001 FP_{31}	—	March 21, 2001	Kitt Peak	Spacewatch	HYG	3.9 km	MPC · JPL
252196	2001 FA_{52}	—	March 18, 2001	Socorro	LINEAR	·	1.5 km	MPC · JPL
252197	2001 FW_{59}	—	March 19, 2001	Socorro	LINEAR	EUP	5.3 km	MPC · JPL
252198	2001 FK_{65}	—	March 19, 2001	Socorro	LINEAR	NYS	1.7 km	MPC · JPL
252199	2001 FK_{73}	—	March 19, 2001	Socorro	LINEAR	·	4.3 km	MPC · JPL
252200	2001 FP_{83}	—	March 26, 2001	Kitt Peak	Spacewatch	·	1.2 km	MPC · JPL

== 252201–252300 ==
back to top

Designation			Discovery			Properties		Ref
Permanent	Provisional	Named after	Date	Site	Discoverer(s)	Category	Diam.	Ref
252201	2001 FJ_{84}	—	March 26, 2001	Kitt Peak	Spacewatch	·	1.1 km	MPC · JPL
252202	2001 FM_{95}	—	March 16, 2001	Socorro	LINEAR	·	2.1 km	MPC · JPL
252203	2001 FG_{107}	—	March 18, 2001	Anderson Mesa	LONEOS	·	4.6 km	MPC · JPL
252204	2001 FN_{111}	—	March 18, 2001	Socorro	LINEAR	·	1.6 km	MPC · JPL
252205	2001 FX_{118}	—	March 20, 2001	Haleakala	NEAT	·	1.9 km	MPC · JPL
252206	2001 FE_{133}	—	March 20, 2001	Haleakala	NEAT	·	2.0 km	MPC · JPL
252207	2001 FK_{137}	—	March 21, 2001	Anderson Mesa	LONEOS	TIR	4.1 km	MPC · JPL
252208	2001 FP_{168}	—	March 22, 2001	Cima Ekar	ADAS	NYS	1.1 km	MPC · JPL
252209	2001 FU_{168}	—	March 23, 2001	Socorro	LINEAR	·	5.8 km	MPC · JPL
252210	2001 FC_{180}	—	March 20, 2001	Anderson Mesa	LONEOS	PHO	1.5 km	MPC · JPL
252211	2001 FF_{191}	—	March 19, 2001	Socorro	LINEAR	NYS	2.0 km	MPC · JPL
252212	2001 HM_{18}	—	April 21, 2001	Socorro	LINEAR	·	3.0 km	MPC · JPL
252213	2001 HE_{31}	—	April 28, 2001	Kitt Peak	Spacewatch	NYS	1.7 km	MPC · JPL
252214	2001 HR_{46}	—	April 18, 2001	Socorro	LINEAR	·	1.2 km	MPC · JPL
252215	2001 HH_{61}	—	April 24, 2001	Kitt Peak	Spacewatch	·	1.5 km	MPC · JPL
252216	2001 KH	—	May 17, 2001	Socorro	LINEAR	H	760 m	MPC · JPL
252217	2001 KK_{23}	—	May 17, 2001	Socorro	LINEAR	·	1.6 km	MPC · JPL
252218	2001 KO_{25}	—	May 17, 2001	Socorro	LINEAR	·	1.5 km	MPC · JPL
252219	2001 KF_{74}	—	May 25, 2001	Kitt Peak	Spacewatch	LIX	5.9 km	MPC · JPL
252220	2001 MQ_{11}	—	June 19, 2001	Haleakala	NEAT	·	3.0 km	MPC · JPL
252221	2001 MQ_{16}	—	June 27, 2001	Palomar	NEAT	·	2.2 km	MPC · JPL
252222	2001 NE_{5}	—	July 13, 2001	Palomar	NEAT	·	2.0 km	MPC · JPL
252223	2001 NX_{5}	—	July 13, 2001	Palomar	NEAT	·	1.6 km	MPC · JPL
252224	2001 NX_{16}	—	July 14, 2001	Palomar	NEAT	T_{j} (2.99) · 3:2	7.4 km	MPC · JPL
252225	2001 ON_{2}	—	July 17, 2001	Anderson Mesa	LONEOS	·	3.0 km	MPC · JPL
252226	2001 OJ_{20}	—	July 21, 2001	Anderson Mesa	LONEOS	·	2.5 km	MPC · JPL
252227	2001 OV_{27}	—	July 18, 2001	Palomar	NEAT	·	3.0 km	MPC · JPL
252228	2001 ON_{63}	—	July 19, 2001	Haleakala	NEAT	·	1.4 km	MPC · JPL
252229	2001 OK_{75}	—	July 24, 2001	Palomar	NEAT	slow	3.4 km	MPC · JPL
252230	2001 OB_{113}	—	July 22, 2001	Palomar	NEAT	·	2.6 km	MPC · JPL
252231	2001 OY_{113}	—	July 19, 2001	Palomar	NEAT	·	1.7 km	MPC · JPL
252232	2001 PX_{2}	—	August 3, 2001	Haleakala	NEAT	·	2.4 km	MPC · JPL
252233	2001 PN_{11}	—	August 9, 2001	Palomar	NEAT	EUN	1.4 km	MPC · JPL
252234	2001 PB_{13}	—	August 10, 2001	Palomar	NEAT	MAR	2.0 km	MPC · JPL
252235	2001 PY_{18}	—	August 10, 2001	Palomar	NEAT	(5)	1.9 km	MPC · JPL
252236	2001 PN_{32}	—	August 10, 2001	Palomar	NEAT	·	1.8 km	MPC · JPL
252237	2001 PL_{39}	—	August 11, 2001	Palomar	NEAT	EUN	1.9 km	MPC · JPL
252238	2001 PY_{40}	—	August 11, 2001	Palomar	NEAT	·	3.0 km	MPC · JPL
252239	2001 PW_{45}	—	August 12, 2001	Palomar	NEAT	·	2.4 km	MPC · JPL
252240	2001 PH_{48}	—	August 3, 2001	Haleakala	NEAT	JUN	2.1 km	MPC · JPL
252241	2001 PD_{65}	—	August 11, 2001	Haleakala	NEAT	·	2.2 km	MPC · JPL
252242	2001 QC_{3}	—	August 16, 2001	Socorro	LINEAR	·	2.0 km	MPC · JPL
252243	2001 QL_{56}	—	August 16, 2001	Socorro	LINEAR	·	2.5 km	MPC · JPL
252244	2001 QZ_{60}	—	August 19, 2001	Socorro	LINEAR	·	3.0 km	MPC · JPL
252245	2001 QJ_{62}	—	August 16, 2001	Socorro	LINEAR	3:2	6.7 km	MPC · JPL
252246	2001 QB_{82}	—	August 17, 2001	Socorro	LINEAR	·	2.9 km	MPC · JPL
252247	2001 QO_{88}	—	August 22, 2001	Kitt Peak	Spacewatch	·	1.1 km	MPC · JPL
252248	2001 QQ_{89}	—	August 16, 2001	Palomar	NEAT	ADE	3.1 km	MPC · JPL
252249	2001 QU_{103}	—	August 19, 2001	Socorro	LINEAR	slow	3.7 km	MPC · JPL
252250	2001 QG_{107}	—	August 23, 2001	Socorro	LINEAR	·	5.7 km	MPC · JPL
252251	2001 QY_{109}	—	August 21, 2001	Haleakala	NEAT	·	2.3 km	MPC · JPL
252252	2001 QE_{114}	—	August 17, 2001	Socorro	LINEAR	·	2.1 km	MPC · JPL
252253	2001 QX_{125}	—	August 19, 2001	Socorro	LINEAR	EUN	2.4 km	MPC · JPL
252254	2001 QY_{130}	—	August 20, 2001	Socorro	LINEAR	·	2.4 km	MPC · JPL
252255	2001 QF_{135}	—	August 22, 2001	Socorro	LINEAR	·	2.8 km	MPC · JPL
252256	2001 QQ_{150}	—	August 23, 2001	Socorro	LINEAR	·	1.8 km	MPC · JPL
252257	2001 QW_{151}	—	August 26, 2001	Socorro	LINEAR	·	4.7 km	MPC · JPL
252258	2001 QB_{153}	—	August 27, 2001	Ondřejov	P. Kušnirák	·	2.2 km	MPC · JPL
252259	2001 QG_{158}	—	August 23, 2001	Anderson Mesa	LONEOS	·	3.5 km	MPC · JPL
252260	2001 QY_{161}	—	August 23, 2001	Anderson Mesa	LONEOS	·	1.6 km	MPC · JPL
252261	2001 QG_{162}	—	August 23, 2001	Anderson Mesa	LONEOS	·	2.7 km	MPC · JPL
252262	2001 QQ_{169}	—	August 22, 2001	Socorro	LINEAR	·	2.0 km	MPC · JPL
252263	2001 QU_{180}	—	August 26, 2001	Palomar	NEAT	·	2.8 km	MPC · JPL
252264	2001 QQ_{187}	—	August 21, 2001	Haleakala	NEAT	·	3.1 km	MPC · JPL
252265	2001 QQ_{189}	—	August 22, 2001	Socorro	LINEAR	·	2.6 km	MPC · JPL
252266	2001 QS_{190}	—	August 22, 2001	Socorro	LINEAR	·	3.1 km	MPC · JPL
252267	2001 QD_{191}	—	August 22, 2001	Palomar	NEAT	HNS	1.7 km	MPC · JPL
252268	2001 QF_{192}	—	August 22, 2001	Socorro	LINEAR	·	2.4 km	MPC · JPL
252269	2001 QQ_{192}	—	August 22, 2001	Socorro	LINEAR	·	2.1 km	MPC · JPL
252270	2001 QR_{195}	—	August 22, 2001	Palomar	NEAT	·	2.8 km	MPC · JPL
252271	2001 QK_{200}	—	August 22, 2001	Palomar	NEAT	JUN	1.4 km	MPC · JPL
252272	2001 QW_{220}	—	August 24, 2001	Anderson Mesa	LONEOS	·	2.1 km	MPC · JPL
252273	2001 QB_{221}	—	August 24, 2001	Anderson Mesa	LONEOS	·	2.4 km	MPC · JPL
252274	2001 QR_{226}	—	August 24, 2001	Anderson Mesa	LONEOS	HIL · 3:2	8.3 km	MPC · JPL
252275	2001 QA_{230}	—	August 24, 2001	Anderson Mesa	LONEOS	EUN	1.8 km	MPC · JPL
252276	2001 QD_{234}	—	August 24, 2001	Socorro	LINEAR	·	1.6 km	MPC · JPL
252277	2001 QD_{235}	—	August 24, 2001	Socorro	LINEAR	·	2.7 km	MPC · JPL
252278	2001 QN_{237}	—	August 24, 2001	Socorro	LINEAR	DOR	4.2 km	MPC · JPL
252279	2001 QO_{242}	—	August 24, 2001	Socorro	LINEAR	EUN	1.5 km	MPC · JPL
252280	2001 QG_{251}	—	August 25, 2001	Socorro	LINEAR	·	3.8 km	MPC · JPL
252281	2001 QF_{254}	—	August 25, 2001	Anderson Mesa	LONEOS	·	2.3 km	MPC · JPL
252282	2001 QR_{274}	—	August 19, 2001	Socorro	LINEAR	JUN	1.3 km	MPC · JPL
252283	2001 QK_{275}	—	August 19, 2001	Anderson Mesa	LONEOS	·	3.1 km	MPC · JPL
252284	2001 QM_{278}	—	August 19, 2001	Socorro	LINEAR	·	2.0 km	MPC · JPL
252285	2001 QO_{279}	—	August 19, 2001	Socorro	LINEAR	·	2.0 km	MPC · JPL
252286	2001 QW_{286}	—	August 17, 2001	Socorro	LINEAR	(7744)	2.0 km	MPC · JPL
252287	2001 QD_{292}	—	August 16, 2001	Palomar	NEAT	MAR	1.4 km	MPC · JPL
252288	2001 QQ_{292}	—	August 16, 2001	Palomar	NEAT	·	1.9 km	MPC · JPL
252289	2001 QJ_{293}	—	August 31, 2001	Palomar	NEAT	·	3.1 km	MPC · JPL
252290	2001 QZ_{309}	—	August 19, 2001	Cerro Tololo	M. W. Buie	·	1.9 km	MPC · JPL
252291	2001 QR_{330}	—	August 27, 2001	Anderson Mesa	LONEOS	JUN	1.5 km	MPC · JPL
252292	2001 RR_{4}	—	September 8, 2001	Socorro	LINEAR	EUN	1.8 km	MPC · JPL
252293	2001 RO_{5}	—	September 9, 2001	Desert Eagle	W. K. Y. Yeung	·	1.5 km	MPC · JPL
252294	2001 RB_{11}	—	September 10, 2001	Desert Eagle	W. K. Y. Yeung	·	2.2 km	MPC · JPL
252295	2001 RT_{12}	—	September 8, 2001	Socorro	LINEAR	·	2.2 km	MPC · JPL
252296	2001 RO_{13}	—	September 10, 2001	Socorro	LINEAR	·	2.6 km	MPC · JPL
252297	2001 RM_{15}	—	September 10, 2001	Socorro	LINEAR	·	2.6 km	MPC · JPL
252298	2001 RN_{23}	—	September 7, 2001	Socorro	LINEAR	·	1.7 km	MPC · JPL
252299	2001 RV_{25}	—	September 7, 2001	Socorro	LINEAR	MAR	1.4 km	MPC · JPL
252300	2001 RP_{29}	—	September 7, 2001	Socorro	LINEAR	·	2.1 km	MPC · JPL

== 252301–252400 ==
back to top

Designation			Discovery			Properties		Ref
Permanent	Provisional	Named after	Date	Site	Discoverer(s)	Category	Diam.	Ref
252301	2001 RY_{32}	—	September 8, 2001	Socorro	LINEAR	(5)	2.1 km	MPC · JPL
252302	2001 RS_{40}	—	September 11, 2001	Socorro	LINEAR	·	2.5 km	MPC · JPL
252303	2001 RW_{50}	—	September 11, 2001	Socorro	LINEAR	·	2.0 km	MPC · JPL
252304	2001 RQ_{59}	—	September 12, 2001	Socorro	LINEAR	EUN	1.8 km	MPC · JPL
252305	2001 RS_{59}	—	September 12, 2001	Socorro	LINEAR	·	3.0 km	MPC · JPL
252306	2001 RZ_{82}	—	September 11, 2001	Anderson Mesa	LONEOS	JUN	1.7 km	MPC · JPL
252307	2001 RR_{83}	—	September 11, 2001	Anderson Mesa	LONEOS	·	1.7 km	MPC · JPL
252308	2001 RT_{86}	—	September 11, 2001	Anderson Mesa	LONEOS	·	2.7 km	MPC · JPL
252309	2001 RC_{90}	—	September 11, 2001	Anderson Mesa	LONEOS	·	3.9 km	MPC · JPL
252310	2001 RJ_{97}	—	September 12, 2001	Kitt Peak	Spacewatch	·	2.0 km	MPC · JPL
252311	2001 RP_{97}	—	September 12, 2001	Kitt Peak	Spacewatch	·	2.4 km	MPC · JPL
252312	2001 RO_{104}	—	September 12, 2001	Socorro	LINEAR	3:2 · SHU	6.9 km	MPC · JPL
252313	2001 RC_{108}	—	September 12, 2001	Socorro	LINEAR	EUN	1.6 km	MPC · JPL
252314	2001 RX_{113}	—	September 12, 2001	Socorro	LINEAR	·	2.6 km	MPC · JPL
252315	2001 RB_{122}	—	September 12, 2001	Socorro	LINEAR	·	2.1 km	MPC · JPL
252316	2001 RU_{125}	—	September 12, 2001	Socorro	LINEAR	MIS	2.2 km	MPC · JPL
252317	2001 RV_{129}	—	September 12, 2001	Socorro	LINEAR	·	2.1 km	MPC · JPL
252318	2001 RV_{135}	—	September 12, 2001	Socorro	LINEAR	·	2.0 km	MPC · JPL
252319	2001 RJ_{141}	—	September 12, 2001	Socorro	LINEAR	·	1.8 km	MPC · JPL
252320	2001 RZ_{141}	—	September 8, 2001	Socorro	LINEAR	·	4.4 km	MPC · JPL
252321	2001 RN_{142}	—	September 10, 2001	Palomar	NEAT	·	2.4 km	MPC · JPL
252322	2001 RK_{146}	—	September 9, 2001	Anderson Mesa	LONEOS	·	2.4 km	MPC · JPL
252323 (1852)	2001 RL_{149}	—	September 10, 2001	Palomar	NEAT	·	3.0 km	MPC · JPL
252324	2001 SX_{1}	—	September 17, 2001	Desert Eagle	W. K. Y. Yeung	·	3.1 km	MPC · JPL
252325	2001 SX_{16}	—	September 16, 2001	Socorro	LINEAR	·	1.8 km	MPC · JPL
252326	2001 SC_{28}	—	September 16, 2001	Socorro	LINEAR	·	2.0 km	MPC · JPL
252327	2001 SM_{35}	—	September 16, 2001	Socorro	LINEAR	·	2.9 km	MPC · JPL
252328	2001 SE_{44}	—	September 16, 2001	Socorro	LINEAR	·	2.6 km	MPC · JPL
252329	2001 SX_{56}	—	September 16, 2001	Socorro	LINEAR	·	2.9 km	MPC · JPL
252330	2001 SW_{74}	—	September 19, 2001	Anderson Mesa	LONEOS	·	2.1 km	MPC · JPL
252331	2001 SA_{90}	—	September 20, 2001	Socorro	LINEAR	·	2.9 km	MPC · JPL
252332	2001 SR_{95}	—	September 20, 2001	Socorro	LINEAR	·	3.7 km	MPC · JPL
252333	2001 SC_{97}	—	September 20, 2001	Socorro	LINEAR	·	2.2 km	MPC · JPL
252334	2001 SU_{97}	—	September 20, 2001	Socorro	LINEAR	·	2.1 km	MPC · JPL
252335	2001 SZ_{97}	—	September 20, 2001	Socorro	LINEAR	·	1.9 km	MPC · JPL
252336	2001 SH_{99}	—	September 20, 2001	Socorro	LINEAR	·	2.0 km	MPC · JPL
252337	2001 SN_{114}	—	September 20, 2001	Desert Eagle	W. K. Y. Yeung	·	2.2 km	MPC · JPL
252338	2001 SH_{117}	—	September 16, 2001	Socorro	LINEAR	ADE	2.5 km	MPC · JPL
252339	2001 SP_{118}	—	September 16, 2001	Socorro	LINEAR	MRX	1.4 km	MPC · JPL
252340	2001 SJ_{127}	—	September 16, 2001	Socorro	LINEAR	·	1.8 km	MPC · JPL
252341	2001 SF_{128}	—	September 16, 2001	Socorro	LINEAR	·	2.4 km	MPC · JPL
252342	2001 SE_{134}	—	September 16, 2001	Socorro	LINEAR	·	2.4 km	MPC · JPL
252343	2001 SJ_{135}	—	September 16, 2001	Socorro	LINEAR	·	2.3 km	MPC · JPL
252344	2001 ST_{135}	—	September 16, 2001	Socorro	LINEAR	·	2.3 km	MPC · JPL
252345	2001 SO_{143}	—	September 16, 2001	Socorro	LINEAR	·	2.8 km	MPC · JPL
252346	2001 SQ_{144}	—	September 16, 2001	Socorro	LINEAR	·	2.5 km	MPC · JPL
252347	2001 SD_{149}	—	September 17, 2001	Socorro	LINEAR	·	2.7 km	MPC · JPL
252348	2001 SD_{152}	—	September 17, 2001	Socorro	LINEAR	·	2.9 km	MPC · JPL
252349	2001 SR_{159}	—	September 17, 2001	Socorro	LINEAR	·	3.2 km	MPC · JPL
252350	2001 SY_{159}	—	September 17, 2001	Socorro	LINEAR	·	3.3 km	MPC · JPL
252351	2001 SG_{160}	—	September 17, 2001	Socorro	LINEAR	·	3.0 km	MPC · JPL
252352	2001 SM_{162}	—	September 17, 2001	Socorro	LINEAR	MRX	1.3 km	MPC · JPL
252353	2001 SL_{163}	—	September 17, 2001	Socorro	LINEAR	·	3.0 km	MPC · JPL
252354	2001 ST_{173}	—	September 16, 2001	Socorro	LINEAR	·	2.6 km	MPC · JPL
252355	2001 SM_{187}	—	September 19, 2001	Socorro	LINEAR	·	1.8 km	MPC · JPL
252356	2001 SU_{194}	—	September 19, 2001	Socorro	LINEAR	·	1.9 km	MPC · JPL
252357	2001 SA_{207}	—	September 19, 2001	Socorro	LINEAR	·	1.7 km	MPC · JPL
252358	2001 SY_{208}	—	September 19, 2001	Socorro	LINEAR	(7744)	1.7 km	MPC · JPL
252359	2001 SG_{217}	—	September 19, 2001	Socorro	LINEAR	·	2.3 km	MPC · JPL
252360	2001 SU_{218}	—	September 19, 2001	Socorro	LINEAR	·	1.8 km	MPC · JPL
252361	2001 SC_{222}	—	September 19, 2001	Socorro	LINEAR	·	2.2 km	MPC · JPL
252362	2001 SF_{222}	—	September 19, 2001	Socorro	LINEAR	·	2.1 km	MPC · JPL
252363	2001 SR_{227}	—	September 19, 2001	Socorro	LINEAR	·	1.9 km	MPC · JPL
252364	2001 SX_{230}	—	September 19, 2001	Socorro	LINEAR	·	2.3 km	MPC · JPL
252365	2001 SY_{232}	—	September 19, 2001	Socorro	LINEAR	EUN	1.5 km	MPC · JPL
252366	2001 SX_{244}	—	September 19, 2001	Socorro	LINEAR	ADE	3.5 km	MPC · JPL
252367	2001 SP_{246}	—	September 19, 2001	Socorro	LINEAR	·	2.0 km	MPC · JPL
252368	2001 SC_{248}	—	September 19, 2001	Socorro	LINEAR	·	2.0 km	MPC · JPL
252369	2001 SE_{255}	—	September 19, 2001	Socorro	LINEAR	GEF	1.3 km	MPC · JPL
252370	2001 SD_{256}	—	September 19, 2001	Socorro	LINEAR	·	2.9 km	MPC · JPL
252371	2001 SU_{259}	—	September 20, 2001	Socorro	LINEAR	·	1.7 km	MPC · JPL
252372	2001 SF_{267}	—	September 25, 2001	Desert Eagle	W. K. Y. Yeung	·	2.5 km	MPC · JPL
252373	2001 SA_{270}	—	September 26, 2001	Socorro	LINEAR	APO +1km	810 m	MPC · JPL
252374	2001 SS_{271}	—	September 20, 2001	Socorro	LINEAR	·	2.7 km	MPC · JPL
252375	2001 SA_{279}	—	September 21, 2001	Anderson Mesa	LONEOS	·	3.0 km	MPC · JPL
252376	2001 SE_{290}	—	September 29, 2001	Palomar	NEAT	·	1.7 km	MPC · JPL
252377	2001 SZ_{292}	—	September 16, 2001	Socorro	LINEAR	·	2.1 km	MPC · JPL
252378	2001 SV_{306}	—	September 20, 2001	Socorro	LINEAR	·	1.9 km	MPC · JPL
252379	2001 SY_{306}	—	September 21, 2001	Socorro	LINEAR	·	2.7 km	MPC · JPL
252380	2001 SF_{307}	—	September 21, 2001	Socorro	LINEAR	·	2.4 km	MPC · JPL
252381	2001 ST_{319}	—	September 21, 2001	Socorro	LINEAR	·	1.9 km	MPC · JPL
252382	2001 SW_{321}	—	September 25, 2001	Socorro	LINEAR	·	2.5 km	MPC · JPL
252383	2001 SX_{324}	—	September 16, 2001	Socorro	LINEAR	EUN	1.8 km	MPC · JPL
252384	2001 SC_{327}	—	September 18, 2001	Kitt Peak	Spacewatch	·	3.4 km	MPC · JPL
252385	2001 SV_{331}	—	September 19, 2001	Socorro	LINEAR	EUN	1.7 km	MPC · JPL
252386	2001 SW_{342}	—	September 21, 2001	Kitt Peak	Spacewatch	·	1.7 km	MPC · JPL
252387	2001 SB_{352}	—	September 19, 2001	Apache Point	SDSS	EUN	1.5 km	MPC · JPL
252388	2001 SE_{353}	—	September 18, 2001	Anderson Mesa	LONEOS	·	2.3 km	MPC · JPL
252389	2001 TT	—	October 6, 2001	Eskridge	Farpoint	BAR	2.4 km	MPC · JPL
252390	2001 TB_{6}	—	October 10, 2001	Palomar	NEAT	EUN	1.7 km	MPC · JPL
252391	2001 TP_{9}	—	October 13, 2001	Socorro	LINEAR	EUN	1.3 km	MPC · JPL
252392	2001 TD_{16}	—	October 11, 2001	Socorro	LINEAR	GEF	1.9 km	MPC · JPL
252393	2001 TJ_{19}	—	October 9, 2001	Socorro	LINEAR	·	2.8 km	MPC · JPL
252394	2001 TR_{24}	—	October 14, 2001	Socorro	LINEAR	EUN	1.9 km	MPC · JPL
252395	2001 TT_{25}	—	October 14, 2001	Socorro	LINEAR	·	3.9 km	MPC · JPL
252396	2001 TB_{31}	—	October 14, 2001	Socorro	LINEAR	·	3.7 km	MPC · JPL
252397	2001 TP_{33}	—	October 14, 2001	Socorro	LINEAR	·	2.6 km	MPC · JPL
252398	2001 TK_{44}	—	October 14, 2001	Socorro	LINEAR	·	3.3 km	MPC · JPL
252399	2001 TX_{44}	—	October 11, 2001	Socorro	LINEAR	ATE · PHA	290 m	MPC · JPL
252400	2001 TB_{46}	—	October 11, 2001	Kitt Peak	Spacewatch	EUN	1.7 km	MPC · JPL

== 252401–252500 ==
back to top

Designation			Discovery			Properties		Ref
Permanent	Provisional	Named after	Date	Site	Discoverer(s)	Category	Diam.	Ref
252401	2001 TH_{48}	—	October 9, 2001	Kitt Peak	Spacewatch	·	2.6 km	MPC · JPL
252402	2001 TK_{58}	—	October 13, 2001	Socorro	LINEAR	·	2.3 km	MPC · JPL
252403	2001 TV_{72}	—	October 13, 2001	Socorro	LINEAR	·	2.6 km	MPC · JPL
252404	2001 TT_{76}	—	October 13, 2001	Socorro	LINEAR	·	1.9 km	MPC · JPL
252405	2001 TE_{81}	—	October 14, 2001	Socorro	LINEAR	·	1.9 km	MPC · JPL
252406	2001 TK_{81}	—	October 14, 2001	Socorro	LINEAR	·	2.6 km	MPC · JPL
252407	2001 TC_{83}	—	October 14, 2001	Socorro	LINEAR	·	2.2 km	MPC · JPL
252408	2001 TV_{89}	—	October 14, 2001	Socorro	LINEAR	·	2.1 km	MPC · JPL
252409	2001 TN_{93}	—	October 14, 2001	Socorro	LINEAR	·	2.8 km	MPC · JPL
252410	2001 TA_{97}	—	October 14, 2001	Socorro	LINEAR	·	3.2 km	MPC · JPL
252411	2001 TZ_{105}	—	October 13, 2001	Socorro	LINEAR	·	3.4 km	MPC · JPL
252412	2001 TO_{109}	—	October 14, 2001	Socorro	LINEAR	·	2.5 km	MPC · JPL
252413	2001 TE_{112}	—	October 14, 2001	Socorro	LINEAR	·	2.5 km	MPC · JPL
252414	2001 TM_{112}	—	October 14, 2001	Socorro	LINEAR	·	2.9 km	MPC · JPL
252415	2001 TX_{113}	—	October 14, 2001	Socorro	LINEAR	·	3.5 km	MPC · JPL
252416	2001 TC_{115}	—	October 14, 2001	Socorro	LINEAR	·	2.6 km	MPC · JPL
252417	2001 TO_{119}	—	October 15, 2001	Socorro	LINEAR	·	3.2 km	MPC · JPL
252418	2001 TG_{121}	—	October 15, 2001	Socorro	LINEAR	·	2.2 km	MPC · JPL
252419	2001 TJ_{121}	—	October 15, 2001	Socorro	LINEAR	·	4.4 km	MPC · JPL
252420	2001 TH_{122}	—	October 15, 2001	Socorro	LINEAR	·	2.9 km	MPC · JPL
252421	2001 TB_{123}	—	October 12, 2001	Anderson Mesa	LONEOS	·	2.4 km	MPC · JPL
252422	2001 TZ_{123}	—	October 12, 2001	Haleakala	NEAT	·	2.5 km	MPC · JPL
252423	2001 TH_{125}	—	October 12, 2001	Haleakala	NEAT	·	2.6 km	MPC · JPL
252424	2001 TO_{125}	—	October 12, 2001	Haleakala	NEAT	·	2.8 km	MPC · JPL
252425	2001 TD_{135}	—	October 13, 2001	Palomar	NEAT	·	2.6 km	MPC · JPL
252426	2001 TQ_{135}	—	October 13, 2001	Palomar	NEAT	·	3.0 km	MPC · JPL
252427	2001 TR_{137}	—	October 14, 2001	Palomar	NEAT	·	2.8 km	MPC · JPL
252428	2001 TZ_{138}	—	October 10, 2001	Palomar	NEAT	·	3.0 km	MPC · JPL
252429	2001 TF_{140}	—	October 10, 2001	Palomar	NEAT	·	2.6 km	MPC · JPL
252430	2001 TP_{140}	—	October 10, 2001	Palomar	NEAT	·	2.0 km	MPC · JPL
252431	2001 TB_{148}	—	October 10, 2001	Palomar	NEAT	·	3.5 km	MPC · JPL
252432	2001 TT_{148}	—	October 10, 2001	Palomar	NEAT	·	2.4 km	MPC · JPL
252433	2001 TU_{148}	—	October 10, 2001	Palomar	NEAT	·	3.4 km	MPC · JPL
252434	2001 TQ_{152}	—	October 10, 2001	Palomar	NEAT	·	1.6 km	MPC · JPL
252435	2001 TS_{155}	—	October 14, 2001	Kitt Peak	Spacewatch	·	2.0 km	MPC · JPL
252436	2001 TA_{163}	—	October 11, 2001	Palomar	NEAT	·	2.0 km	MPC · JPL
252437	2001 TM_{163}	—	October 11, 2001	Palomar	NEAT	·	2.3 km	MPC · JPL
252438	2001 TE_{167}	—	October 15, 2001	Socorro	LINEAR	·	3.1 km	MPC · JPL
252439	2001 TP_{169}	—	October 15, 2001	Socorro	LINEAR	·	2.9 km	MPC · JPL
252440	2001 TW_{171}	—	October 13, 2001	Anderson Mesa	LONEOS	·	2.3 km	MPC · JPL
252441	2001 TL_{177}	—	October 14, 2001	Socorro	LINEAR	PAD	2.1 km	MPC · JPL
252442	2001 TK_{189}	—	October 14, 2001	Socorro	LINEAR	EUN	2.4 km	MPC · JPL
252443	2001 TM_{190}	—	October 14, 2001	Socorro	LINEAR	EUN	2.1 km	MPC · JPL
252444	2001 TB_{192}	—	October 14, 2001	Socorro	LINEAR	GEF	2.0 km	MPC · JPL
252445	2001 TS_{193}	—	October 15, 2001	Socorro	LINEAR	·	2.0 km	MPC · JPL
252446	2001 TY_{194}	—	October 15, 2001	Kitt Peak	Spacewatch	·	2.1 km	MPC · JPL
252447	2001 TC_{197}	—	October 15, 2001	Palomar	NEAT	DOR	3.3 km	MPC · JPL
252448	2001 TX_{201}	—	October 11, 2001	Socorro	LINEAR	·	3.0 km	MPC · JPL
252449	2001 TZ_{201}	—	October 11, 2001	Socorro	LINEAR	·	2.5 km	MPC · JPL
252450	2001 TQ_{205}	—	October 11, 2001	Socorro	LINEAR	EUN	1.9 km	MPC · JPL
252451	2001 TF_{206}	—	October 11, 2001	Palomar	NEAT	·	2.2 km	MPC · JPL
252452	2001 TZ_{209}	—	October 13, 2001	Palomar	NEAT	ADE	3.0 km	MPC · JPL
252453	2001 TE_{212}	—	October 13, 2001	Socorro	LINEAR	·	1.9 km	MPC · JPL
252454	2001 TM_{213}	—	October 13, 2001	Anderson Mesa	LONEOS	·	2.3 km	MPC · JPL
252455	2001 TO_{215}	—	October 13, 2001	Palomar	NEAT	·	2.3 km	MPC · JPL
252456	2001 TF_{220}	—	October 14, 2001	Socorro	LINEAR	·	2.0 km	MPC · JPL
252457	2001 TH_{224}	—	October 14, 2001	Socorro	LINEAR	·	3.2 km	MPC · JPL
252458	2001 TH_{227}	—	October 15, 2001	Socorro	LINEAR	·	3.2 km	MPC · JPL
252459	2001 TS_{228}	—	October 15, 2001	Socorro	LINEAR	·	2.6 km	MPC · JPL
252460	2001 TZ_{231}	—	October 15, 2001	Kitt Peak	Spacewatch	NEM	2.6 km	MPC · JPL
252461	2001 TS_{233}	—	October 15, 2001	Palomar	NEAT	slow	2.6 km	MPC · JPL
252462	2001 TS_{235}	—	October 15, 2001	Palomar	NEAT	·	3.2 km	MPC · JPL
252463	2001 TE_{241}	—	October 15, 2001	Palomar	NEAT	·	2.8 km	MPC · JPL
252464	2001 TO_{241}	—	October 11, 2001	Kitt Peak	Spacewatch	·	2.4 km	MPC · JPL
252465	2001 TB_{244}	—	October 14, 2001	Apache Point	SDSS	·	1.7 km	MPC · JPL
252466	2001 TC_{255}	—	October 14, 2001	Apache Point	SDSS	3:2	7.3 km	MPC · JPL
252467	2001 TZ_{257}	—	October 10, 2001	Palomar	NEAT	·	2.3 km	MPC · JPL
252468	2001 US_{3}	—	October 16, 2001	Socorro	LINEAR	·	2.7 km	MPC · JPL
252469	2001 UR_{5}	—	October 21, 2001	Desert Eagle	W. K. Y. Yeung	·	3.8 km	MPC · JPL
252470 Puigmarti	2001 UE_{14}	Puigmarti	October 24, 2001	Begues	Manteca, J.	ADE	5.0 km	MPC · JPL
252471	2001 UC_{16}	—	October 25, 2001	Desert Eagle	W. K. Y. Yeung	·	2.5 km	MPC · JPL
252472	2001 UV_{19}	—	October 16, 2001	Palomar	NEAT	MIS	2.5 km	MPC · JPL
252473	2001 UH_{21}	—	October 17, 2001	Socorro	LINEAR	EUN	2.2 km	MPC · JPL
252474	2001 UH_{23}	—	October 18, 2001	Socorro	LINEAR	·	2.5 km	MPC · JPL
252475	2001 UJ_{23}	—	October 18, 2001	Socorro	LINEAR	·	2.2 km	MPC · JPL
252476	2001 UX_{42}	—	October 17, 2001	Socorro	LINEAR	AGN	1.2 km	MPC · JPL
252477	2001 US_{44}	—	October 17, 2001	Socorro	LINEAR	AGN	1.6 km	MPC · JPL
252478	2001 UY_{44}	—	October 17, 2001	Socorro	LINEAR	MRX	1.7 km	MPC · JPL
252479	2001 UD_{53}	—	October 17, 2001	Socorro	LINEAR	ADE	2.7 km	MPC · JPL
252480	2001 UN_{61}	—	October 17, 2001	Socorro	LINEAR	·	2.5 km	MPC · JPL
252481	2001 UL_{63}	—	October 17, 2001	Socorro	LINEAR	·	1.9 km	MPC · JPL
252482	2001 UB_{68}	—	October 20, 2001	Socorro	LINEAR	·	2.3 km	MPC · JPL
252483	2001 UE_{68}	—	October 20, 2001	Socorro	LINEAR	ADE	3.6 km	MPC · JPL
252484	2001 UV_{73}	—	October 17, 2001	Socorro	LINEAR	EUN	1.7 km	MPC · JPL
252485	2001 UE_{75}	—	October 17, 2001	Socorro	LINEAR	·	2.8 km	MPC · JPL
252486	2001 UR_{76}	—	October 17, 2001	Socorro	LINEAR	·	1.8 km	MPC · JPL
252487	2001 UY_{76}	—	October 17, 2001	Socorro	LINEAR	EUN	2.0 km	MPC · JPL
252488	2001 UF_{79}	—	October 20, 2001	Socorro	LINEAR	·	2.6 km	MPC · JPL
252489	2001 US_{84}	—	October 21, 2001	Socorro	LINEAR	·	2.0 km	MPC · JPL
252490	2001 UK_{87}	—	October 18, 2001	Kitt Peak	Spacewatch	·	3.0 km	MPC · JPL
252491	2001 UV_{94}	—	October 19, 2001	Haleakala	NEAT	·	3.0 km	MPC · JPL
252492	2001 UF_{98}	—	October 17, 2001	Socorro	LINEAR	·	2.4 km	MPC · JPL
252493	2001 UJ_{100}	—	October 17, 2001	Socorro	LINEAR	·	2.2 km	MPC · JPL
252494	2001 UT_{103}	—	October 20, 2001	Socorro	LINEAR	·	2.7 km	MPC · JPL
252495	2001 UA_{104}	—	October 20, 2001	Socorro	LINEAR	·	2.5 km	MPC · JPL
252496	2001 UB_{108}	—	October 20, 2001	Socorro	LINEAR	MRX	1.7 km	MPC · JPL
252497	2001 UN_{112}	—	October 21, 2001	Socorro	LINEAR	·	3.2 km	MPC · JPL
252498	2001 UN_{122}	—	October 22, 2001	Socorro	LINEAR	·	3.4 km	MPC · JPL
252499	2001 UL_{124}	—	October 22, 2001	Palomar	NEAT	·	2.5 km	MPC · JPL
252500	2001 UA_{130}	—	October 20, 2001	Socorro	LINEAR	EOS	2.7 km	MPC · JPL

== 252501–252600 ==
back to top

Designation			Discovery			Properties		Ref
Permanent	Provisional	Named after	Date	Site	Discoverer(s)	Category	Diam.	Ref
252501	2001 UK_{131}	—	October 20, 2001	Socorro	LINEAR	·	2.5 km	MPC · JPL
252502	2001 UN_{131}	—	October 20, 2001	Socorro	LINEAR	·	2.5 km	MPC · JPL
252503	2001 UX_{132}	—	October 21, 2001	Socorro	LINEAR	·	2.4 km	MPC · JPL
252504	2001 UD_{136}	—	October 22, 2001	Socorro	LINEAR	·	1.9 km	MPC · JPL
252505	2001 UQ_{138}	—	October 23, 2001	Socorro	LINEAR	EUN	2.0 km	MPC · JPL
252506	2001 UC_{145}	—	October 23, 2001	Socorro	LINEAR	·	2.4 km	MPC · JPL
252507	2001 UB_{155}	—	October 23, 2001	Socorro	LINEAR	·	3.0 km	MPC · JPL
252508	2001 UV_{169}	—	October 21, 2001	Socorro	LINEAR	·	2.3 km	MPC · JPL
252509	2001 UG_{173}	—	October 18, 2001	Palomar	NEAT	NEM	3.0 km	MPC · JPL
252510	2001 UE_{175}	—	October 24, 2001	Palomar	NEAT	EUN	1.6 km	MPC · JPL
252511	2001 UR_{179}	—	October 26, 2001	Haleakala	NEAT	·	3.5 km	MPC · JPL
252512	2001 US_{183}	—	October 16, 2001	Palomar	NEAT	·	2.8 km	MPC · JPL
252513	2001 UV_{183}	—	October 16, 2001	Palomar	NEAT	·	2.4 km	MPC · JPL
252514	2001 UH_{187}	—	October 17, 2001	Palomar	NEAT	EUN	2.0 km	MPC · JPL
252515	2001 UY_{188}	—	October 17, 2001	Palomar	NEAT	·	2.3 km	MPC · JPL
252516	2001 UF_{190}	—	October 18, 2001	Palomar	NEAT	AEO	1.2 km	MPC · JPL
252517	2001 UC_{199}	—	October 19, 2001	Palomar	NEAT	·	2.3 km	MPC · JPL
252518	2001 UR_{201}	—	October 19, 2001	Palomar	NEAT	·	2.2 km	MPC · JPL
252519	2001 UN_{202}	—	October 19, 2001	Palomar	NEAT	·	2.5 km	MPC · JPL
252520	2001 UT_{202}	—	October 19, 2001	Kitt Peak	Spacewatch	·	3.0 km	MPC · JPL
252521	2001 UJ_{203}	—	October 19, 2001	Kitt Peak	Spacewatch	·	2.2 km	MPC · JPL
252522	2001 UY_{205}	—	October 19, 2001	Palomar	NEAT	AGN	1.6 km	MPC · JPL
252523	2001 UA_{211}	—	October 21, 2001	Socorro	LINEAR	·	2.5 km	MPC · JPL
252524	2001 UN_{217}	—	October 24, 2001	Socorro	LINEAR	·	1.9 km	MPC · JPL
252525	2001 UW_{219}	—	October 18, 2001	Socorro	LINEAR	·	2.7 km	MPC · JPL
252526	2001 UK_{220}	—	October 21, 2001	Socorro	LINEAR	·	2.1 km	MPC · JPL
252527	2001 UX_{224}	—	October 21, 2001	Socorro	LINEAR	·	2.7 km	MPC · JPL
252528	2001 UK_{227}	—	October 16, 2001	Palomar	NEAT	·	2.2 km	MPC · JPL
252529	2001 VK_{8}	—	November 9, 2001	Socorro	LINEAR	·	2.7 km	MPC · JPL
252530	2001 VX_{11}	—	November 10, 2001	Socorro	LINEAR	·	3.2 km	MPC · JPL
252531	2001 VR_{12}	—	November 10, 2001	Socorro	LINEAR	·	2.8 km	MPC · JPL
252532	2001 VX_{16}	—	November 11, 2001	Socorro	LINEAR	·	2.4 km	MPC · JPL
252533	2001 VB_{20}	—	November 9, 2001	Socorro	LINEAR	·	2.7 km	MPC · JPL
252534	2001 VF_{30}	—	November 9, 2001	Socorro	LINEAR	·	2.3 km	MPC · JPL
252535	2001 VV_{31}	—	November 9, 2001	Socorro	LINEAR	·	1.8 km	MPC · JPL
252536	2001 VS_{52}	—	November 10, 2001	Socorro	LINEAR	·	2.6 km	MPC · JPL
252537	2001 VJ_{53}	—	November 10, 2001	Socorro	LINEAR	·	3.3 km	MPC · JPL
252538	2001 VX_{53}	—	November 10, 2001	Socorro	LINEAR	·	2.8 km	MPC · JPL
252539	2001 VL_{54}	—	November 10, 2001	Socorro	LINEAR	·	2.7 km	MPC · JPL
252540	2001 VE_{57}	—	November 10, 2001	Socorro	LINEAR	·	2.7 km	MPC · JPL
252541	2001 VE_{60}	—	November 10, 2001	Socorro	LINEAR	GEF	1.7 km	MPC · JPL
252542	2001 VT_{60}	—	November 10, 2001	Socorro	LINEAR	·	2.6 km	MPC · JPL
252543	2001 VH_{61}	—	November 10, 2001	Socorro	LINEAR	·	2.5 km	MPC · JPL
252544	2001 VQ_{61}	—	November 10, 2001	Socorro	LINEAR	MRX	1.6 km	MPC · JPL
252545	2001 VN_{66}	—	November 10, 2001	Socorro	LINEAR	·	2.6 km	MPC · JPL
252546	2001 VJ_{67}	—	November 10, 2001	Socorro	LINEAR	·	3.0 km	MPC · JPL
252547	2001 VY_{67}	—	November 11, 2001	Socorro	LINEAR	·	2.6 km	MPC · JPL
252548	2001 VC_{72}	—	November 8, 2001	Palomar	NEAT	·	1.5 km	MPC · JPL
252549	2001 VV_{75}	—	November 15, 2001	Kitt Peak	Spacewatch	·	3.5 km	MPC · JPL
252550	2001 VO_{80}	—	November 10, 2001	Palomar	NEAT	EUN	1.8 km	MPC · JPL
252551	2001 VD_{83}	—	November 10, 2001	Socorro	LINEAR	(5)	2.0 km	MPC · JPL
252552	2001 VM_{89}	—	November 12, 2001	Socorro	LINEAR	·	2.5 km	MPC · JPL
252553	2001 VG_{93}	—	November 15, 2001	Socorro	LINEAR	·	3.0 km	MPC · JPL
252554	2001 VK_{105}	—	November 12, 2001	Socorro	LINEAR	·	2.5 km	MPC · JPL
252555	2001 VG_{110}	—	November 12, 2001	Socorro	LINEAR	·	2.3 km	MPC · JPL
252556	2001 VT_{111}	—	November 12, 2001	Socorro	LINEAR	·	3.1 km	MPC · JPL
252557	2001 VR_{112}	—	November 12, 2001	Socorro	LINEAR	·	2.4 km	MPC · JPL
252558	2001 WT_{1}	—	November 17, 2001	Socorro	LINEAR	APO	530 m	MPC · JPL
252559	2001 WM_{10}	—	November 17, 2001	Socorro	LINEAR	·	2.2 km	MPC · JPL
252560	2001 WF_{11}	—	November 17, 2001	Socorro	LINEAR	·	2.4 km	MPC · JPL
252561	2001 WX_{19}	—	November 17, 2001	Socorro	LINEAR	·	2.3 km	MPC · JPL
252562	2001 WM_{20}	—	November 17, 2001	Socorro	LINEAR	·	3.3 km	MPC · JPL
252563	2001 WN_{21}	—	November 18, 2001	Socorro	LINEAR	·	2.7 km	MPC · JPL
252564	2001 WP_{21}	—	November 18, 2001	Socorro	LINEAR	·	2.4 km	MPC · JPL
252565	2001 WA_{23}	—	November 27, 2001	Socorro	LINEAR	(14916)	4.1 km	MPC · JPL
252566	2001 WZ_{36}	—	November 17, 2001	Socorro	LINEAR	AST	2.9 km	MPC · JPL
252567	2001 WU_{41}	—	November 18, 2001	Socorro	LINEAR	·	4.2 km	MPC · JPL
252568	2001 WZ_{41}	—	November 18, 2001	Socorro	LINEAR	WIT	1.4 km	MPC · JPL
252569	2001 WL_{50}	—	November 17, 2001	Socorro	LINEAR	NEM	3.0 km	MPC · JPL
252570	2001 WX_{50}	—	November 17, 2001	Socorro	LINEAR	AST	2.2 km	MPC · JPL
252571	2001 WG_{53}	—	November 19, 2001	Socorro	LINEAR	·	2.5 km	MPC · JPL
252572	2001 WP_{55}	—	November 19, 2001	Socorro	LINEAR	MRX	1.3 km	MPC · JPL
252573	2001 WT_{55}	—	November 19, 2001	Socorro	LINEAR	·	3.0 km	MPC · JPL
252574	2001 WD_{58}	—	November 19, 2001	Socorro	LINEAR	·	2.3 km	MPC · JPL
252575	2001 WK_{65}	—	November 20, 2001	Socorro	LINEAR	·	2.2 km	MPC · JPL
252576	2001 WP_{65}	—	November 20, 2001	Socorro	LINEAR	·	1.7 km	MPC · JPL
252577	2001 WQ_{69}	—	November 20, 2001	Socorro	LINEAR	·	2.3 km	MPC · JPL
252578	2001 WV_{79}	—	November 20, 2001	Socorro	LINEAR	·	2.8 km	MPC · JPL
252579	2001 WG_{81}	—	November 20, 2001	Socorro	LINEAR	·	3.3 km	MPC · JPL
252580	2001 WC_{82}	—	November 20, 2001	Socorro	LINEAR	·	2.6 km	MPC · JPL
252581	2001 WJ_{83}	—	November 20, 2001	Socorro	LINEAR	HOF	3.1 km	MPC · JPL
252582	2001 WN_{87}	—	November 19, 2001	Socorro	LINEAR	·	3.4 km	MPC · JPL
252583	2001 WE_{93}	—	November 21, 2001	Socorro	LINEAR	MRX	1.3 km	MPC · JPL
252584	2001 WY_{97}	—	November 19, 2001	Anderson Mesa	LONEOS	PAD	2.2 km	MPC · JPL
252585	2001 WY_{99}	—	November 21, 2001	Socorro	LINEAR	WIT	1.3 km	MPC · JPL
252586	2001 WB_{100}	—	November 24, 2001	Socorro	LINEAR	·	2.6 km	MPC · JPL
252587	2001 WM_{101}	—	November 17, 2001	Socorro	LINEAR	·	2.8 km	MPC · JPL
252588	2001 WS_{101}	—	November 17, 2001	Anderson Mesa	LONEOS	·	2.9 km	MPC · JPL
252589	2001 WL_{102}	—	November 20, 2001	Socorro	LINEAR	·	2.2 km	MPC · JPL
252590	2001 WR_{103}	—	November 21, 2001	Apache Point	SDSS	·	3.1 km	MPC · JPL
252591	2001 XO_{1}	—	December 9, 2001	Badlands	Badlands	·	4.0 km	MPC · JPL
252592	2001 XV_{7}	—	December 8, 2001	Socorro	LINEAR	·	3.1 km	MPC · JPL
252593	2001 XL_{9}	—	December 9, 2001	Socorro	LINEAR	·	3.9 km	MPC · JPL
252594	2001 XM_{10}	—	December 9, 2001	Socorro	LINEAR	JUN	1.6 km	MPC · JPL
252595	2001 XL_{13}	—	December 9, 2001	Socorro	LINEAR	·	3.0 km	MPC · JPL
252596	2001 XW_{14}	—	December 9, 2001	Socorro	LINEAR	·	2.5 km	MPC · JPL
252597	2001 XU_{25}	—	December 10, 2001	Socorro	LINEAR	·	3.2 km	MPC · JPL
252598	2001 XA_{29}	—	December 11, 2001	Socorro	LINEAR	·	4.8 km	MPC · JPL
252599	2001 XY_{41}	—	December 9, 2001	Socorro	LINEAR	·	3.4 km	MPC · JPL
252600	2001 XA_{44}	—	December 9, 2001	Socorro	LINEAR	·	2.9 km	MPC · JPL

== 252601–252700 ==
back to top

Designation			Discovery			Properties		Ref
Permanent	Provisional	Named after	Date	Site	Discoverer(s)	Category	Diam.	Ref
252601	2001 XF_{44}	—	December 9, 2001	Socorro	LINEAR	·	2.5 km	MPC · JPL
252602	2001 XD_{48}	—	December 9, 2001	Socorro	LINEAR	·	6.0 km	MPC · JPL
252603	2001 XM_{48}	—	December 10, 2001	Socorro	LINEAR	·	2.6 km	MPC · JPL
252604	2001 XV_{52}	—	December 10, 2001	Socorro	LINEAR	·	3.6 km	MPC · JPL
252605	2001 XA_{56}	—	December 10, 2001	Socorro	LINEAR	·	2.3 km	MPC · JPL
252606	2001 XH_{69}	—	December 11, 2001	Socorro	LINEAR	·	3.3 km	MPC · JPL
252607	2001 XD_{74}	—	December 11, 2001	Socorro	LINEAR	·	2.9 km	MPC · JPL
252608	2001 XX_{78}	—	December 11, 2001	Socorro	LINEAR	·	2.4 km	MPC · JPL
252609	2001 XP_{83}	—	December 11, 2001	Socorro	LINEAR	·	2.2 km	MPC · JPL
252610	2001 XV_{89}	—	December 10, 2001	Socorro	LINEAR	·	3.1 km	MPC · JPL
252611	2001 XK_{92}	—	December 10, 2001	Socorro	LINEAR	·	3.0 km	MPC · JPL
252612	2001 XB_{96}	—	December 10, 2001	Socorro	LINEAR	·	3.4 km	MPC · JPL
252613	2001 XE_{100}	—	December 10, 2001	Socorro	LINEAR	·	2.4 km	MPC · JPL
252614	2001 XD_{106}	—	December 10, 2001	Socorro	LINEAR	·	2.1 km	MPC · JPL
252615	2001 XR_{106}	—	December 10, 2001	Socorro	LINEAR	GEF	2.1 km	MPC · JPL
252616	2001 XQ_{111}	—	December 11, 2001	Socorro	LINEAR	·	2.9 km	MPC · JPL
252617	2001 XA_{114}	—	December 13, 2001	Socorro	LINEAR	GEF	2.3 km	MPC · JPL
252618	2001 XV_{115}	—	December 13, 2001	Socorro	LINEAR	(18466)	4.2 km	MPC · JPL
252619	2001 XV_{121}	—	December 14, 2001	Socorro	LINEAR	·	3.3 km	MPC · JPL
252620	2001 XL_{128}	—	December 14, 2001	Socorro	LINEAR	AGN	1.3 km	MPC · JPL
252621	2001 XL_{132}	—	December 14, 2001	Socorro	LINEAR	·	2.6 km	MPC · JPL
252622	2001 XQ_{133}	—	December 14, 2001	Socorro	LINEAR	615	1.7 km	MPC · JPL
252623	2001 XG_{140}	—	December 14, 2001	Socorro	LINEAR	·	3.4 km	MPC · JPL
252624	2001 XM_{149}	—	December 14, 2001	Socorro	LINEAR	·	3.4 km	MPC · JPL
252625	2001 XC_{165}	—	December 14, 2001	Socorro	LINEAR	·	3.4 km	MPC · JPL
252626	2001 XY_{170}	—	December 14, 2001	Socorro	LINEAR	·	2.6 km	MPC · JPL
252627	2001 XA_{186}	—	December 14, 2001	Socorro	LINEAR	MRX	1.5 km	MPC · JPL
252628	2001 XV_{191}	—	December 14, 2001	Socorro	LINEAR	·	3.8 km	MPC · JPL
252629	2001 XN_{192}	—	December 14, 2001	Socorro	LINEAR	·	2.4 km	MPC · JPL
252630	2001 XF_{196}	—	December 14, 2001	Socorro	LINEAR	DOR	3.6 km	MPC · JPL
252631	2001 XM_{198}	—	December 14, 2001	Socorro	LINEAR	·	2.5 km	MPC · JPL
252632	2001 XE_{201}	—	December 14, 2001	Kitt Peak	Spacewatch	·	1.2 km	MPC · JPL
252633	2001 XQ_{213}	—	December 11, 2001	Socorro	LINEAR	·	3.4 km	MPC · JPL
252634	2001 XW_{213}	—	December 11, 2001	Socorro	LINEAR	·	2.4 km	MPC · JPL
252635	2001 XM_{219}	—	December 15, 2001	Socorro	LINEAR	EOS	3.5 km	MPC · JPL
252636	2001 XA_{220}	—	December 15, 2001	Socorro	LINEAR	·	3.6 km	MPC · JPL
252637	2001 XG_{221}	—	December 15, 2001	Socorro	LINEAR	WIT	1.6 km	MPC · JPL
252638	2001 XB_{230}	—	December 15, 2001	Socorro	LINEAR	·	2.7 km	MPC · JPL
252639	2001 XM_{230}	—	December 15, 2001	Socorro	LINEAR	·	2.9 km	MPC · JPL
252640	2001 XW_{231}	—	December 15, 2001	Socorro	LINEAR	·	2.9 km	MPC · JPL
252641	2001 XS_{233}	—	December 15, 2001	Socorro	LINEAR	·	2.3 km	MPC · JPL
252642	2001 XP_{245}	—	December 15, 2001	Socorro	LINEAR	·	2.7 km	MPC · JPL
252643	2001 XF_{250}	—	December 14, 2001	Socorro	LINEAR	·	2.9 km	MPC · JPL
252644	2001 XH_{253}	—	December 14, 2001	Kitt Peak	Spacewatch	PAD	3.3 km	MPC · JPL
252645	2001 XF_{256}	—	December 5, 2001	Haleakala	NEAT	GEF	2.1 km	MPC · JPL
252646	2001 XR_{256}	—	December 7, 2001	Socorro	LINEAR	·	3.4 km	MPC · JPL
252647	2001 XR_{267}	—	December 15, 2001	Apache Point	SDSS	·	3.5 km	MPC · JPL
252648	2001 YH_{10}	—	December 17, 2001	Socorro	LINEAR	·	2.6 km	MPC · JPL
252649	2001 YX_{12}	—	December 17, 2001	Socorro	LINEAR	·	2.3 km	MPC · JPL
252650	2001 YA_{15}	—	December 17, 2001	Socorro	LINEAR	·	3.4 km	MPC · JPL
252651	2001 YY_{19}	—	December 18, 2001	Socorro	LINEAR	·	3.0 km	MPC · JPL
252652	2001 YU_{26}	—	December 18, 2001	Socorro	LINEAR	·	2.2 km	MPC · JPL
252653	2001 YR_{27}	—	December 18, 2001	Socorro	LINEAR	BRA	2.4 km	MPC · JPL
252654	2001 YN_{58}	—	December 18, 2001	Socorro	LINEAR	BRA	1.9 km	MPC · JPL
252655	2001 YK_{89}	—	December 18, 2001	Socorro	LINEAR	·	2.6 km	MPC · JPL
252656	2001 YD_{110}	—	December 18, 2001	Socorro	LINEAR	·	3.2 km	MPC · JPL
252657	2001 YG_{110}	—	December 19, 2001	Socorro	LINEAR	·	3.1 km	MPC · JPL
252658	2001 YR_{118}	—	December 18, 2001	Socorro	LINEAR	·	3.7 km	MPC · JPL
252659	2001 YQ_{121}	—	December 17, 2001	Socorro	LINEAR	·	3.1 km	MPC · JPL
252660	2001 YA_{128}	—	December 17, 2001	Socorro	LINEAR	DOR	3.3 km	MPC · JPL
252661	2001 YM_{137}	—	December 22, 2001	Socorro	LINEAR	DOR	2.9 km	MPC · JPL
252662	2001 YQ_{141}	—	December 17, 2001	Socorro	LINEAR	·	2.3 km	MPC · JPL
252663	2001 YA_{151}	—	December 19, 2001	Socorro	LINEAR	·	3.8 km	MPC · JPL
252664	2002 AP	—	January 5, 2002	Oizumi	T. Kobayashi	·	4.0 km	MPC · JPL
252665	2002 AG_{1}	—	January 4, 2002	Cima Ekar	ADAS	·	2.9 km	MPC · JPL
252666	2002 AE_{7}	—	January 9, 2002	Cima Ekar	ADAS	EOS	3.2 km	MPC · JPL
252667	2002 AH_{26}	—	January 11, 2002	Kitt Peak	Spacewatch	·	2.9 km	MPC · JPL
252668	2002 AS_{29}	—	January 8, 2002	Socorro	LINEAR	·	3.1 km	MPC · JPL
252669	2002 AA_{36}	—	January 9, 2002	Socorro	LINEAR	·	2.2 km	MPC · JPL
252670	2002 AD_{36}	—	January 9, 2002	Socorro	LINEAR	·	2.7 km	MPC · JPL
252671	2002 AB_{43}	—	January 9, 2002	Socorro	LINEAR	·	1.7 km	MPC · JPL
252672	2002 AU_{55}	—	January 9, 2002	Socorro	LINEAR	·	2.3 km	MPC · JPL
252673	2002 AZ_{58}	—	January 9, 2002	Socorro	LINEAR	slow	1.2 km	MPC · JPL
252674	2002 AQ_{69}	—	January 8, 2002	Socorro	LINEAR	·	3.1 km	MPC · JPL
252675	2002 AB_{70}	—	January 8, 2002	Socorro	LINEAR	(32418)	3.2 km	MPC · JPL
252676	2002 AA_{105}	—	January 9, 2002	Socorro	LINEAR	·	2.4 km	MPC · JPL
252677	2002 AP_{107}	—	January 9, 2002	Socorro	LINEAR	·	1.4 km	MPC · JPL
252678	2002 AE_{109}	—	January 9, 2002	Socorro	LINEAR	·	1.8 km	MPC · JPL
252679	2002 AU_{135}	—	January 9, 2002	Socorro	LINEAR	·	3.0 km	MPC · JPL
252680	2002 AX_{137}	—	January 9, 2002	Socorro	LINEAR	·	2.1 km	MPC · JPL
252681	2002 AV_{140}	—	January 13, 2002	Socorro	LINEAR	·	3.2 km	MPC · JPL
252682	2002 AU_{160}	—	January 13, 2002	Socorro	LINEAR	EOS	2.6 km	MPC · JPL
252683	2002 AE_{166}	—	January 13, 2002	Socorro	LINEAR	L4 · ERY	10 km	MPC · JPL
252684	2002 AE_{169}	—	January 14, 2002	Socorro	LINEAR	·	4.7 km	MPC · JPL
252685	2002 AX_{171}	—	January 14, 2002	Socorro	LINEAR	·	4.1 km	MPC · JPL
252686	2002 AV_{192}	—	January 12, 2002	Kitt Peak	Spacewatch	KOR	2.0 km	MPC · JPL
252687	2002 AA_{204}	—	January 5, 2002	Cima Ekar	ADAS	·	2.8 km	MPC · JPL
252688	2002 BV_{13}	—	January 19, 2002	Socorro	LINEAR	·	2.3 km	MPC · JPL
252689	2002 BU_{21}	—	January 25, 2002	Socorro	LINEAR	·	4.2 km	MPC · JPL
252690	2002 BR_{22}	—	January 23, 2002	Socorro	LINEAR	·	4.7 km	MPC · JPL
252691	2002 BF_{31}	—	January 19, 2002	Socorro	LINEAR	·	1.2 km	MPC · JPL
252692	2002 BK_{32}	—	January 17, 2002	Palomar	NEAT	·	2.0 km	MPC · JPL
252693	2002 CQ	—	February 2, 2002	Cima Ekar	ADAS	·	1.2 km	MPC · JPL
252694	2002 CO_{9}	—	February 6, 2002	Kitt Peak	Spacewatch	·	810 m	MPC · JPL
252695	2002 CL_{27}	—	February 6, 2002	Socorro	LINEAR	·	1.9 km	MPC · JPL
252696	2002 CL_{33}	—	February 6, 2002	Socorro	LINEAR	·	960 m	MPC · JPL
252697	2002 CT_{38}	—	February 7, 2002	Socorro	LINEAR	·	1.3 km	MPC · JPL
252698	2002 CL_{54}	—	February 7, 2002	Socorro	LINEAR	L4	10 km	MPC · JPL
252699	2002 CD_{57}	—	February 7, 2002	Socorro	LINEAR	·	1.4 km	MPC · JPL
252700	2002 CP_{68}	—	February 7, 2002	Socorro	LINEAR	·	3.3 km	MPC · JPL

== 252701–252800 ==
back to top

Designation			Discovery			Properties		Ref
Permanent	Provisional	Named after	Date	Site	Discoverer(s)	Category	Diam.	Ref
252701	2002 CD_{88}	—	February 7, 2002	Socorro	LINEAR	·	3.0 km	MPC · JPL
252702	2002 CB_{91}	—	February 7, 2002	Socorro	LINEAR	L4	10 km	MPC · JPL
252703	2002 CS_{97}	—	February 7, 2002	Socorro	LINEAR	·	930 m	MPC · JPL
252704	2002 CT_{99}	—	February 7, 2002	Socorro	LINEAR	·	1.3 km	MPC · JPL
252705	2002 CL_{101}	—	February 7, 2002	Socorro	LINEAR	·	4.5 km	MPC · JPL
252706	2002 CK_{123}	—	February 7, 2002	Socorro	LINEAR	·	1.8 km	MPC · JPL
252707	2002 CK_{124}	—	February 7, 2002	Socorro	LINEAR	·	950 m	MPC · JPL
252708	2002 CU_{125}	—	February 7, 2002	Socorro	LINEAR	·	1.2 km	MPC · JPL
252709	2002 CV_{133}	—	February 7, 2002	Socorro	LINEAR	·	1.2 km	MPC · JPL
252710	2002 CM_{135}	—	February 8, 2002	Socorro	LINEAR	·	1.0 km	MPC · JPL
252711	2002 CU_{152}	—	February 10, 2002	Socorro	LINEAR	L4 · ERY	10 km	MPC · JPL
252712	2002 CN_{153}	—	February 8, 2002	Kitt Peak	Spacewatch	·	3.0 km	MPC · JPL
252713	2002 CD_{162}	—	February 8, 2002	Socorro	LINEAR	·	3.0 km	MPC · JPL
252714	2002 CZ_{169}	—	February 8, 2002	Socorro	LINEAR	·	3.1 km	MPC · JPL
252715	2002 CQ_{171}	—	February 8, 2002	Socorro	LINEAR	·	3.1 km	MPC · JPL
252716	2002 CT_{173}	—	February 8, 2002	Socorro	LINEAR	·	3.2 km	MPC · JPL
252717	2002 CK_{194}	—	February 10, 2002	Socorro	LINEAR	KOR	1.6 km	MPC · JPL
252718	2002 CQ_{194}	—	February 10, 2002	Socorro	LINEAR	·	1.9 km	MPC · JPL
252719	2002 CO_{197}	—	February 10, 2002	Socorro	LINEAR	·	1.0 km	MPC · JPL
252720	2002 CE_{201}	—	February 10, 2002	Socorro	LINEAR	L4	10 km	MPC · JPL
252721	2002 CV_{214}	—	February 10, 2002	Socorro	LINEAR	·	930 m	MPC · JPL
252722	2002 CL_{217}	—	February 10, 2002	Socorro	LINEAR	·	1.3 km	MPC · JPL
252723	2002 CU_{226}	—	February 5, 2002	Palomar	NEAT	EOS	2.9 km	MPC · JPL
252724	2002 CN_{228}	—	February 6, 2002	Palomar	NEAT	L4	20 km	MPC · JPL
252725	2002 CG_{235}	—	February 12, 2002	Kitt Peak	Spacewatch	·	1.7 km	MPC · JPL
252726	2002 CK_{237}	—	February 10, 2002	Socorro	LINEAR	·	3.5 km	MPC · JPL
252727	2002 CC_{239}	—	February 11, 2002	Socorro	LINEAR	·	3.2 km	MPC · JPL
252728	2002 CR_{246}	—	February 13, 2002	Kitt Peak	Spacewatch	EOS	2.7 km	MPC · JPL
252729	2002 CB_{257}	—	February 5, 2002	Anderson Mesa	LONEOS	·	3.2 km	MPC · JPL
252730	2002 CO_{263}	—	February 7, 2002	Palomar	NEAT	KOR	1.8 km	MPC · JPL
252731	2002 CY_{265}	—	February 7, 2002	Kitt Peak	Spacewatch	·	1.0 km	MPC · JPL
252732	2002 CO_{275}	—	February 9, 2002	Kitt Peak	Spacewatch	·	3.3 km	MPC · JPL
252733	2002 CB_{278}	—	February 7, 2002	Palomar	NEAT	·	3.2 km	MPC · JPL
252734	2002 CM_{286}	—	February 10, 2002	Socorro	LINEAR	·	990 m	MPC · JPL
252735	2002 CK_{287}	—	February 8, 2002	Haleakala	NEAT	·	3.7 km	MPC · JPL
252736	2002 CL_{299}	—	February 12, 2002	Socorro	LINEAR	·	910 m	MPC · JPL
252737	2002 CW_{306}	—	February 7, 2002	Socorro	LINEAR	L4	12 km	MPC · JPL
252738	2002 CV_{310}	—	February 8, 2002	Socorro	LINEAR	·	890 m	MPC · JPL
252739	2002 CJ_{314}	—	February 11, 2002	Socorro	LINEAR	·	2.9 km	MPC · JPL
252740	2002 CO_{315}	—	February 14, 2002	Kvistaberg	Uppsala-DLR Asteroid Survey	L4	20 km	MPC · JPL
252741	2002 CW_{315}	—	February 12, 2002	Kitt Peak	Spacewatch	L4	9.5 km	MPC · JPL
252742	2002 DG_{19}	—	February 24, 2002	Palomar	NEAT	L4	10 km	MPC · JPL
252743	2002 EJ_{1}	—	March 6, 2002	Ondřejov	P. Kušnirák	L4	10 km	MPC · JPL
252744	2002 EL_{3}	—	March 7, 2002	Cima Ekar	ADAS	·	950 m	MPC · JPL
252745	2002 EV_{4}	—	March 10, 2002	Cima Ekar	ADAS	·	2.7 km	MPC · JPL
252746	2002 EX_{5}	—	March 11, 2002	Palomar	NEAT	L4	10 km	MPC · JPL
252747	2002 EQ_{13}	—	March 4, 2002	Palomar	NEAT	·	2.8 km	MPC · JPL
252748	2002 EB_{17}	—	March 5, 2002	Kitt Peak	Spacewatch	KOR	1.8 km	MPC · JPL
252749	2002 EQ_{27}	—	March 9, 2002	Socorro	LINEAR	·	4.7 km	MPC · JPL
252750	2002 ED_{28}	—	March 9, 2002	Socorro	LINEAR	·	980 m	MPC · JPL
252751	2002 EB_{29}	—	March 9, 2002	Socorro	LINEAR	·	840 m	MPC · JPL
252752	2002 EH_{32}	—	March 9, 2002	Palomar	NEAT	·	2.2 km	MPC · JPL
252753	2002 EW_{33}	—	March 11, 2002	Palomar	NEAT	·	4.5 km	MPC · JPL
252754	2002 EV_{42}	—	March 12, 2002	Socorro	LINEAR	·	6.1 km	MPC · JPL
252755	2002 EJ_{43}	—	March 12, 2002	Socorro	LINEAR	·	1.1 km	MPC · JPL
252756	2002 EF_{45}	—	March 10, 2002	Haleakala	NEAT	·	990 m	MPC · JPL
252757	2002 EL_{48}	—	March 12, 2002	Palomar	NEAT	·	3.2 km	MPC · JPL
252758	2002 ES_{48}	—	March 12, 2002	Palomar	NEAT	·	1.0 km	MPC · JPL
252759	2002 EJ_{50}	—	March 12, 2002	Palomar	NEAT	·	4.0 km	MPC · JPL
252760	2002 ET_{54}	—	March 13, 2002	Kitt Peak	Spacewatch	·	1.3 km	MPC · JPL
252761	2002 EM_{56}	—	March 13, 2002	Socorro	LINEAR	·	1.3 km	MPC · JPL
252762	2002 EY_{58}	—	March 13, 2002	Socorro	LINEAR	L4	20 km	MPC · JPL
252763	2002 EJ_{67}	—	March 13, 2002	Socorro	LINEAR	·	4.2 km	MPC · JPL
252764	2002 EB_{69}	—	March 13, 2002	Socorro	LINEAR	·	5.3 km	MPC · JPL
252765	2002 EB_{73}	—	March 13, 2002	Socorro	LINEAR	·	6.3 km	MPC · JPL
252766	2002 EU_{78}	—	March 10, 2002	Haleakala	NEAT	V	1.1 km	MPC · JPL
252767	2002 EN_{81}	—	March 13, 2002	Palomar	NEAT	·	880 m	MPC · JPL
252768	2002 EX_{87}	—	March 9, 2002	Socorro	LINEAR	·	890 m	MPC · JPL
252769	2002 EW_{89}	—	March 12, 2002	Socorro	LINEAR	·	1.3 km	MPC · JPL
252770	2002 ED_{91}	—	March 12, 2002	Socorro	LINEAR	·	2.6 km	MPC · JPL
252771	2002 EB_{95}	—	March 14, 2002	Socorro	LINEAR	·	1.7 km	MPC · JPL
252772	2002 EC_{103}	—	March 9, 2002	Palomar	NEAT	·	1.2 km	MPC · JPL
252773	2002 EE_{107}	—	March 9, 2002	Anderson Mesa	LONEOS	·	5.7 km	MPC · JPL
252774	2002 EH_{108}	—	March 9, 2002	Palomar	NEAT	·	1.1 km	MPC · JPL
252775	2002 EE_{121}	—	March 11, 2002	Kitt Peak	Spacewatch	·	4.0 km	MPC · JPL
252776	2002 EO_{122}	—	March 12, 2002	Palomar	NEAT	·	3.3 km	MPC · JPL
252777	2002 EZ_{123}	—	March 12, 2002	Kitt Peak	Spacewatch	HYG	3.6 km	MPC · JPL
252778	2002 EY_{126}	—	March 12, 2002	Anderson Mesa	LONEOS	·	1.1 km	MPC · JPL
252779	2002 EB_{127}	—	March 12, 2002	Palomar	NEAT	·	1.1 km	MPC · JPL
252780	2002 EN_{129}	—	March 13, 2002	Socorro	LINEAR	·	3.7 km	MPC · JPL
252781	2002 EW_{129}	—	March 11, 2002	Cima Ekar	ADAS	PHO	1.6 km	MPC · JPL
252782	2002 EO_{130}	—	March 12, 2002	Socorro	LINEAR	·	3.4 km	MPC · JPL
252783	2002 EO_{132}	—	March 13, 2002	Palomar	NEAT	EOS	2.5 km	MPC · JPL
252784	2002 EH_{133}	—	March 13, 2002	Socorro	LINEAR	·	4.0 km	MPC · JPL
252785	2002 EJ_{134}	—	March 13, 2002	Palomar	NEAT	·	3.4 km	MPC · JPL
252786	2002 EV_{137}	—	March 12, 2002	Palomar	NEAT	KOR	1.9 km	MPC · JPL
252787	2002 EN_{143}	—	March 12, 2002	Palomar	NEAT	·	1.3 km	MPC · JPL
252788	2002 ER_{143}	—	March 12, 2002	Palomar	NEAT	·	1.8 km	MPC · JPL
252789	2002 EA_{147}	—	March 14, 2002	Palomar	NEAT	THB	4.3 km	MPC · JPL
252790	2002 EM_{154}	—	March 13, 2002	Socorro	LINEAR	·	3.3 km	MPC · JPL
252791	2002 EX_{162}	—	March 10, 2002	Kitt Peak	Spacewatch	·	2.1 km	MPC · JPL
252792	2002 EK_{163}	—	March 10, 2002	Palomar	NEAT	·	6.2 km	MPC · JPL
252793	2002 FW_{5}	—	March 20, 2002	Socorro	LINEAR	AMO	500 m	MPC · JPL
252794 Maironis	2002 FL_{7}	Maironis	March 16, 2002	Moletai	K. Černis, Zdanavicius, J.	TIR	4.5 km	MPC · JPL
252795	2002 FA_{8}	—	March 16, 2002	Socorro	LINEAR	EOS	3.4 km	MPC · JPL
252796	2002 FK_{9}	—	March 16, 2002	Socorro	LINEAR	·	1.3 km	MPC · JPL
252797	2002 FY_{14}	—	March 16, 2002	Haleakala	NEAT	·	2.8 km	MPC · JPL
252798	2002 FP_{16}	—	March 16, 2002	Haleakala	NEAT	PHO	1.5 km	MPC · JPL
252799	2002 FZ_{19}	—	March 18, 2002	Kitt Peak	Spacewatch	EOS	2.5 km	MPC · JPL
252800	2002 FC_{21}	—	March 19, 2002	Anderson Mesa	LONEOS	·	1.3 km	MPC · JPL

== 252801–252900 ==
back to top

Designation			Discovery			Properties		Ref
Permanent	Provisional	Named after	Date	Site	Discoverer(s)	Category	Diam.	Ref
252801	2002 FH_{21}	—	March 19, 2002	Palomar	NEAT	·	4.1 km	MPC · JPL
252802	2002 FS_{21}	—	March 19, 2002	Anderson Mesa	LONEOS	·	860 m	MPC · JPL
252803	2002 FG_{23}	—	March 17, 2002	Kitt Peak	Spacewatch	VER	4.0 km	MPC · JPL
252804	2002 FH_{23}	—	March 17, 2002	Kitt Peak	Spacewatch	·	960 m	MPC · JPL
252805	2002 GC_{1}	—	April 3, 2002	Drebach	G. Lehmann	·	960 m	MPC · JPL
252806	2002 GH_{4}	—	April 9, 2002	Socorro	LINEAR	H	560 m	MPC · JPL
252807	2002 GV_{5}	—	April 12, 2002	Palomar	NEAT	·	5.0 km	MPC · JPL
252808	2002 GQ_{12}	—	April 14, 2002	Socorro	LINEAR	·	1.2 km	MPC · JPL
252809	2002 GF_{16}	—	April 15, 2002	Socorro	LINEAR	(8737)	4.5 km	MPC · JPL
252810	2002 GL_{16}	—	April 15, 2002	Socorro	LINEAR	EOS	3.3 km	MPC · JPL
252811	2002 GQ_{20}	—	April 14, 2002	Socorro	LINEAR	·	1.1 km	MPC · JPL
252812	2002 GB_{34}	—	April 1, 2002	Palomar	NEAT	·	3.4 km	MPC · JPL
252813	2002 GS_{39}	—	April 4, 2002	Palomar	NEAT	·	4.7 km	MPC · JPL
252814	2002 GA_{43}	—	April 4, 2002	Haleakala	NEAT	EOS	4.8 km	MPC · JPL
252815	2002 GR_{44}	—	April 4, 2002	Haleakala	NEAT	·	1.5 km	MPC · JPL
252816	2002 GL_{46}	—	April 2, 2002	Palomar	NEAT	·	6.7 km	MPC · JPL
252817	2002 GT_{46}	—	April 5, 2002	Anderson Mesa	LONEOS	·	720 m	MPC · JPL
252818	2002 GR_{47}	—	April 4, 2002	Kitt Peak	Spacewatch	·	2.9 km	MPC · JPL
252819	2002 GE_{54}	—	April 5, 2002	Bergisch Gladbach	W. Bickel	·	1.0 km	MPC · JPL
252820	2002 GU_{62}	—	April 8, 2002	Palomar	NEAT	NYS	1.2 km	MPC · JPL
252821	2002 GY_{63}	—	April 8, 2002	Palomar	NEAT	·	3.0 km	MPC · JPL
252822	2002 GF_{66}	—	April 8, 2002	Palomar	NEAT	·	2.5 km	MPC · JPL
252823	2002 GW_{70}	—	April 8, 2002	Palomar	NEAT	·	4.3 km	MPC · JPL
252824	2002 GH_{77}	—	April 9, 2002	Anderson Mesa	LONEOS	·	1.0 km	MPC · JPL
252825	2002 GW_{92}	—	April 9, 2002	Socorro	LINEAR	EOS	4.0 km	MPC · JPL
252826	2002 GF_{96}	—	April 9, 2002	Socorro	LINEAR	·	4.5 km	MPC · JPL
252827	2002 GJ_{96}	—	April 9, 2002	Socorro	LINEAR	·	5.1 km	MPC · JPL
252828	2002 GZ_{97}	—	April 10, 2002	Socorro	LINEAR	·	4.1 km	MPC · JPL
252829	2002 GU_{100}	—	April 10, 2002	Socorro	LINEAR	VER	6.3 km	MPC · JPL
252830	2002 GP_{107}	—	April 11, 2002	Socorro	LINEAR	·	1.2 km	MPC · JPL
252831	2002 GJ_{111}	—	April 10, 2002	Socorro	LINEAR	·	4.6 km	MPC · JPL
252832	2002 GQ_{111}	—	April 10, 2002	Socorro	LINEAR	V	1.1 km	MPC · JPL
252833	2002 GW_{114}	—	April 11, 2002	Socorro	LINEAR	·	6.8 km	MPC · JPL
252834	2002 GP_{116}	—	April 11, 2002	Socorro	LINEAR	VER	4.8 km	MPC · JPL
252835	2002 GM_{117}	—	April 11, 2002	Socorro	LINEAR	·	4.8 km	MPC · JPL
252836	2002 GC_{118}	—	April 11, 2002	Haleakala	NEAT	·	1.1 km	MPC · JPL
252837	2002 GT_{119}	—	April 12, 2002	Socorro	LINEAR	·	1.2 km	MPC · JPL
252838	2002 GO_{121}	—	April 10, 2002	Socorro	LINEAR	·	5.7 km	MPC · JPL
252839	2002 GQ_{121}	—	April 10, 2002	Socorro	LINEAR	HYG	3.8 km	MPC · JPL
252840	2002 GW_{121}	—	April 10, 2002	Socorro	LINEAR	·	1.2 km	MPC · JPL
252841	2002 GL_{122}	—	April 10, 2002	Socorro	LINEAR	·	1.4 km	MPC · JPL
252842	2002 GQ_{122}	—	April 10, 2002	Socorro	LINEAR	·	1.1 km	MPC · JPL
252843	2002 GB_{125}	—	April 12, 2002	Socorro	LINEAR	·	3.2 km	MPC · JPL
252844	2002 GL_{128}	—	April 12, 2002	Socorro	LINEAR	·	3.6 km	MPC · JPL
252845	2002 GN_{128}	—	April 12, 2002	Socorro	LINEAR	·	4.3 km	MPC · JPL
252846	2002 GD_{129}	—	April 12, 2002	Socorro	LINEAR	·	5.2 km	MPC · JPL
252847	2002 GZ_{129}	—	April 12, 2002	Socorro	LINEAR	·	4.5 km	MPC · JPL
252848	2002 GL_{134}	—	April 12, 2002	Kitt Peak	Spacewatch	·	940 m	MPC · JPL
252849	2002 GA_{139}	—	April 13, 2002	Palomar	NEAT	L4	17 km	MPC · JPL
252850	2002 GF_{142}	—	April 13, 2002	Palomar	NEAT	·	3.8 km	MPC · JPL
252851	2002 GO_{147}	—	April 13, 2002	Palomar	NEAT	(2076)	1.1 km	MPC · JPL
252852	2002 GY_{147}	—	April 13, 2002	Palomar	NEAT	·	4.2 km	MPC · JPL
252853	2002 GT_{148}	—	April 14, 2002	Socorro	LINEAR	·	1.1 km	MPC · JPL
252854	2002 GR_{149}	—	April 14, 2002	Socorro	LINEAR	·	740 m	MPC · JPL
252855	2002 GS_{151}	—	April 14, 2002	Haleakala	NEAT	·	1.1 km	MPC · JPL
252856	2002 GO_{157}	—	April 13, 2002	Palomar	NEAT	V	900 m	MPC · JPL
252857	2002 GO_{169}	—	April 9, 2002	Socorro	LINEAR	·	3.9 km	MPC · JPL
252858	2002 GP_{178}	—	April 8, 2002	Palomar	NEAT	·	4.5 km	MPC · JPL
252859	2002 GZ_{178}	—	April 10, 2002	Palomar	NEAT	·	1.1 km	MPC · JPL
252860	2002 GB_{179}	—	April 8, 2002	Palomar	NEAT	·	760 m	MPC · JPL
252861	2002 GE_{183}	—	April 4, 2002	Palomar	NEAT	·	4.5 km	MPC · JPL
252862	2002 GN_{185}	—	April 8, 2002	Palomar	NEAT	·	3.6 km	MPC · JPL
252863	2002 HS_{1}	—	April 16, 2002	Socorro	LINEAR	·	890 m	MPC · JPL
252864	2002 HS_{10}	—	April 22, 2002	Palomar	NEAT	·	5.0 km	MPC · JPL
252865	2002 HA_{15}	—	April 17, 2002	Socorro	LINEAR	·	2.9 km	MPC · JPL
252866	2002 HJ_{17}	—	April 20, 2002	Kitt Peak	Spacewatch	·	3.6 km	MPC · JPL
252867	2002 JG_{5}	—	May 5, 2002	Desert Eagle	W. K. Y. Yeung	·	1.2 km	MPC · JPL
252868	2002 JR_{5}	—	May 5, 2002	Palomar	NEAT	·	4.6 km	MPC · JPL
252869	2002 JE_{21}	—	May 8, 2002	Haleakala	NEAT	AEG	3.9 km	MPC · JPL
252870	2002 JD_{22}	—	May 8, 2002	Socorro	LINEAR	·	1.1 km	MPC · JPL
252871	2002 JA_{23}	—	May 8, 2002	Socorro	LINEAR	·	1.1 km	MPC · JPL
252872	2002 JE_{25}	—	May 8, 2002	Socorro	LINEAR	(883)	1.5 km	MPC · JPL
252873	2002 JF_{32}	—	May 9, 2002	Socorro	LINEAR	·	1.4 km	MPC · JPL
252874	2002 JJ_{37}	—	May 7, 2002	Palomar	NEAT	·	4.9 km	MPC · JPL
252875	2002 JD_{42}	—	May 8, 2002	Socorro	LINEAR	·	1.1 km	MPC · JPL
252876	2002 JN_{53}	—	May 9, 2002	Socorro	LINEAR	·	5.5 km	MPC · JPL
252877	2002 JO_{57}	—	May 9, 2002	Socorro	LINEAR	TIR	4.1 km	MPC · JPL
252878	2002 JF_{58}	—	May 9, 2002	Socorro	LINEAR	·	1.3 km	MPC · JPL
252879	2002 JE_{60}	—	May 10, 2002	Socorro	LINEAR	·	1 km	MPC · JPL
252880	2002 JA_{62}	—	May 8, 2002	Socorro	LINEAR	·	1.2 km	MPC · JPL
252881	2002 JF_{63}	—	May 9, 2002	Socorro	LINEAR	·	1.3 km	MPC · JPL
252882	2002 JM_{68}	—	May 11, 2002	Socorro	LINEAR	·	1.3 km	MPC · JPL
252883	2002 JY_{76}	—	May 11, 2002	Socorro	LINEAR	·	1.0 km	MPC · JPL
252884	2002 JV_{78}	—	May 11, 2002	Socorro	LINEAR	·	1.5 km	MPC · JPL
252885	2002 JU_{80}	—	May 11, 2002	Socorro	LINEAR	V	840 m	MPC · JPL
252886	2002 JE_{81}	—	May 11, 2002	Socorro	LINEAR	·	3.0 km	MPC · JPL
252887	2002 JJ_{81}	—	May 11, 2002	Socorro	LINEAR	·	1.4 km	MPC · JPL
252888	2002 JV_{83}	—	May 11, 2002	Socorro	LINEAR	·	3.1 km	MPC · JPL
252889	2002 JM_{84}	—	May 11, 2002	Socorro	LINEAR	·	3.6 km	MPC · JPL
252890	2002 JX_{85}	—	May 11, 2002	Socorro	LINEAR	·	960 m	MPC · JPL
252891	2002 JC_{86}	—	May 11, 2002	Socorro	LINEAR	V	770 m	MPC · JPL
252892	2002 JB_{87}	—	May 11, 2002	Socorro	LINEAR	·	4.1 km	MPC · JPL
252893	2002 JK_{88}	—	May 11, 2002	Socorro	LINEAR	·	5.4 km	MPC · JPL
252894	2002 JA_{90}	—	May 11, 2002	Socorro	LINEAR	·	4.0 km	MPC · JPL
252895	2002 JT_{102}	—	May 9, 2002	Socorro	LINEAR	·	6.7 km	MPC · JPL
252896	2002 JG_{104}	—	May 10, 2002	Socorro	LINEAR	·	1.3 km	MPC · JPL
252897	2002 JE_{105}	—	May 12, 2002	Socorro	LINEAR	·	1.7 km	MPC · JPL
252898	2002 JO_{112}	—	May 13, 2002	Socorro	LINEAR	·	2.6 km	MPC · JPL
252899	2002 JF_{118}	—	May 4, 2002	Palomar	NEAT	EUP	5.4 km	MPC · JPL
252900	2002 JD_{121}	—	May 5, 2002	Palomar	NEAT	·	6.1 km	MPC · JPL

== 252901–253000 ==
back to top

Designation			Discovery			Properties		Ref
Permanent	Provisional	Named after	Date	Site	Discoverer(s)	Category	Diam.	Ref
252901	2002 JW_{123}	—	May 6, 2002	Palomar	NEAT	·	940 m	MPC · JPL
252902	2002 JX_{127}	—	May 7, 2002	Palomar	NEAT	·	1.4 km	MPC · JPL
252903	2002 JK_{129}	—	May 8, 2002	Anderson Mesa	LONEOS	·	4.4 km	MPC · JPL
252904	2002 JN_{131}	—	May 9, 2002	Palomar	NEAT	·	4.5 km	MPC · JPL
252905	2002 JP_{132}	—	May 9, 2002	Palomar	NEAT	·	990 m	MPC · JPL
252906	2002 JB_{134}	—	May 9, 2002	Palomar	NEAT	URS	4.2 km	MPC · JPL
252907	2002 JE_{136}	—	May 9, 2002	Palomar	NEAT	THM	3.1 km	MPC · JPL
252908	2002 JC_{142}	—	May 11, 2002	Socorro	LINEAR	·	710 m	MPC · JPL
252909	2002 KV_{3}	—	May 18, 2002	Socorro	LINEAR	H	1.1 km	MPC · JPL
252910	2002 LO_{4}	—	June 5, 2002	Socorro	LINEAR	·	1.5 km	MPC · JPL
252911	2002 LE_{17}	—	June 6, 2002	Socorro	LINEAR	·	2.6 km	MPC · JPL
252912	2002 LT_{17}	—	June 6, 2002	Socorro	LINEAR	·	1.2 km	MPC · JPL
252913	2002 LO_{38}	—	June 6, 2002	Socorro	LINEAR	·	1.4 km	MPC · JPL
252914	2002 LK_{49}	—	June 6, 2002	Socorro	LINEAR	·	2.0 km	MPC · JPL
252915	2002 LW_{50}	—	June 8, 2002	Kitt Peak	Spacewatch	V	820 m	MPC · JPL
252916	2002 LC_{55}	—	June 11, 2002	Palomar	NEAT	·	5.7 km	MPC · JPL
252917	2002 LL_{63}	—	June 13, 2002	Palomar	NEAT	·	1.2 km	MPC · JPL
252918	2002 NG_{18}	—	July 9, 2002	Socorro	LINEAR	·	1.9 km	MPC · JPL
252919	2002 NY_{21}	—	July 9, 2002	Socorro	LINEAR	·	2.2 km	MPC · JPL
252920	2002 NU_{28}	—	July 13, 2002	Haleakala	NEAT	·	1.6 km	MPC · JPL
252921	2002 NX_{33}	—	July 13, 2002	Haleakala	NEAT	·	1.6 km	MPC · JPL
252922	2002 NA_{35}	—	July 9, 2002	Socorro	LINEAR	H	740 m	MPC · JPL
252923	2002 NU_{40}	—	July 14, 2002	Palomar	NEAT	NYS	1.5 km	MPC · JPL
252924	2002 NZ_{46}	—	July 12, 2002	Palomar	NEAT	·	1.8 km	MPC · JPL
252925	2002 NB_{49}	—	July 14, 2002	Palomar	NEAT	·	1.6 km	MPC · JPL
252926	2002 NS_{59}	—	July 9, 2002	Palomar	NEAT	NYS	1.3 km	MPC · JPL
252927	2002 NE_{62}	—	July 5, 2002	Palomar	NEAT	·	1.4 km	MPC · JPL
252928	2002 NH_{62}	—	July 14, 2002	Palomar	NEAT	·	1.5 km	MPC · JPL
252929	2002 NJ_{65}	—	July 4, 2002	Palomar	NEAT	PHO	1.5 km	MPC · JPL
252930	2002 NV_{65}	—	July 4, 2002	Palomar	NEAT	MAS	950 m	MPC · JPL
252931	2002 OV_{10}	—	July 22, 2002	Palomar	NEAT	·	1.3 km	MPC · JPL
252932	2002 OC_{21}	—	July 22, 2002	Palomar	NEAT	NYS	1.5 km	MPC · JPL
252933	2002 PJ_{6}	—	August 2, 2002	Campo Imperatore	CINEOS	·	2.1 km	MPC · JPL
252934	2002 PQ_{7}	—	August 6, 2002	Palomar	NEAT	·	1.4 km	MPC · JPL
252935	2002 PG_{10}	—	August 5, 2002	Palomar	NEAT	·	1.6 km	MPC · JPL
252936	2002 PD_{13}	—	August 6, 2002	Palomar	NEAT	·	1.4 km	MPC · JPL
252937	2002 PR_{14}	—	August 6, 2002	Palomar	NEAT	·	1.4 km	MPC · JPL
252938	2002 PQ_{15}	—	August 6, 2002	Palomar	NEAT	·	1.7 km	MPC · JPL
252939	2002 PD_{21}	—	August 6, 2002	Palomar	NEAT	·	1.7 km	MPC · JPL
252940	2002 PP_{21}	—	August 6, 2002	Palomar	NEAT	(5)	1.6 km	MPC · JPL
252941	2002 PC_{23}	—	August 6, 2002	Palomar	NEAT	·	1.2 km	MPC · JPL
252942	2002 PZ_{24}	—	August 6, 2002	Palomar	NEAT	V	990 m	MPC · JPL
252943	2002 PH_{38}	—	August 6, 2002	Palomar	NEAT	MAS	900 m	MPC · JPL
252944	2002 PA_{43}	—	August 11, 2002	Needville	J. Dellinger, W. G. Dillon	·	1.7 km	MPC · JPL
252945	2002 PY_{51}	—	August 8, 2002	Palomar	NEAT	MAS	820 m	MPC · JPL
252946	2002 PE_{58}	—	August 10, 2002	Socorro	LINEAR	·	1.5 km	MPC · JPL
252947	2002 PL_{68}	—	August 6, 2002	Palomar	NEAT	·	1.9 km	MPC · JPL
252948	2002 PC_{75}	—	August 12, 2002	Socorro	LINEAR	·	2.9 km	MPC · JPL
252949	2002 PB_{76}	—	August 8, 2002	Palomar	NEAT	V	1.0 km	MPC · JPL
252950	2002 PX_{77}	—	August 11, 2002	Haleakala	NEAT	(5)	1.9 km	MPC · JPL
252951	2002 PW_{78}	—	August 11, 2002	Palomar	NEAT	NEM	3.7 km	MPC · JPL
252952	2002 PK_{89}	—	August 11, 2002	Socorro	LINEAR	·	2.5 km	MPC · JPL
252953	2002 PB_{91}	—	August 13, 2002	Socorro	LINEAR	·	3.6 km	MPC · JPL
252954	2002 PZ_{97}	—	August 14, 2002	Socorro	LINEAR	·	3.2 km	MPC · JPL
252955	2002 PQ_{107}	—	August 13, 2002	Palomar	NEAT	·	1.5 km	MPC · JPL
252956	2002 PS_{111}	—	August 14, 2002	Socorro	LINEAR	·	1.6 km	MPC · JPL
252957	2002 PL_{113}	—	August 14, 2002	Socorro	LINEAR	·	2.4 km	MPC · JPL
252958	2002 PM_{116}	—	August 14, 2002	Anderson Mesa	LONEOS	·	2.2 km	MPC · JPL
252959	2002 PU_{117}	—	August 12, 2002	Haleakala	NEAT	·	1.6 km	MPC · JPL
252960	2002 PK_{118}	—	August 13, 2002	Anderson Mesa	LONEOS	·	1.0 km	MPC · JPL
252961	2002 PA_{119}	—	August 13, 2002	Anderson Mesa	LONEOS	·	1.3 km	MPC · JPL
252962	2002 PS_{127}	—	August 14, 2002	Socorro	LINEAR	NYS	1.3 km	MPC · JPL
252963	2002 PS_{135}	—	August 14, 2002	Socorro	LINEAR	·	1.5 km	MPC · JPL
252964	2002 PU_{137}	—	August 15, 2002	Anderson Mesa	LONEOS	·	1.3 km	MPC · JPL
252965	2002 PA_{139}	—	August 12, 2002	Socorro	LINEAR	H	710 m	MPC · JPL
252966	2002 PJ_{139}	—	August 12, 2002	Socorro	LINEAR	H	760 m	MPC · JPL
252967	2002 PR_{141}	—	August 15, 2002	Socorro	LINEAR	H	750 m	MPC · JPL
252968	2002 PM_{155}	—	August 8, 2002	Palomar	S. F. Hönig	MAS	870 m	MPC · JPL
252969	2002 PM_{158}	—	August 8, 2002	Palomar	S. F. Hönig	·	1.4 km	MPC · JPL
252970	2002 PB_{159}	—	August 8, 2002	Palomar	S. F. Hönig	·	1.3 km	MPC · JPL
252971	2002 PL_{163}	—	August 8, 2002	Palomar	S. F. Hönig	NYS	1.4 km	MPC · JPL
252972	2002 PZ_{165}	—	August 8, 2002	Palomar	Lowe, A.	·	1.5 km	MPC · JPL
252973	2002 PQ_{177}	—	August 8, 2002	Palomar	NEAT	NYS	1.5 km	MPC · JPL
252974	2002 PE_{182}	—	August 15, 2002	Palomar	NEAT	·	1.6 km	MPC · JPL
252975	2002 QV_{21}	—	August 26, 2002	Palomar	NEAT	MAS	810 m	MPC · JPL
252976	2002 QB_{23}	—	August 27, 2002	Palomar	NEAT	MAS	870 m	MPC · JPL
252977	2002 QF_{23}	—	August 27, 2002	Palomar	NEAT	·	1.2 km	MPC · JPL
252978	2002 QM_{24}	—	August 29, 2002	Palomar	NEAT	H	720 m	MPC · JPL
252979	2002 QE_{29}	—	August 29, 2002	Palomar	NEAT	·	1.3 km	MPC · JPL
252980	2002 QA_{30}	—	August 29, 2002	Palomar	NEAT	·	1.5 km	MPC · JPL
252981	2002 QA_{35}	—	August 29, 2002	Palomar	NEAT	·	1.3 km	MPC · JPL
252982	2002 QB_{63}	—	August 27, 2002	Palomar	NEAT	·	1.2 km	MPC · JPL
252983	2002 QG_{72}	—	August 27, 2002	Palomar	NEAT	·	760 m	MPC · JPL
252984	2002 QK_{78}	—	August 29, 2002	Palomar	NEAT	·	1.5 km	MPC · JPL
252985	2002 QQ_{80}	—	August 28, 2002	Palomar	NEAT	MAS	1.0 km	MPC · JPL
252986	2002 QP_{89}	—	August 27, 2002	Palomar	NEAT	NYS	1.2 km	MPC · JPL
252987	2002 QA_{91}	—	August 19, 2002	Palomar	NEAT	V	940 m	MPC · JPL
252988	2002 QL_{97}	—	August 18, 2002	Palomar	NEAT	·	1.4 km	MPC · JPL
252989	2002 QJ_{99}	—	August 19, 2002	Palomar	NEAT	·	1.3 km	MPC · JPL
252990	2002 QN_{99}	—	August 18, 2002	Palomar	NEAT	·	1.6 km	MPC · JPL
252991	2002 QN_{100}	—	August 19, 2002	Palomar	NEAT	V	800 m	MPC · JPL
252992	2002 QE_{102}	—	August 20, 2002	Palomar	NEAT	·	1.7 km	MPC · JPL
252993	2002 QR_{102}	—	August 19, 2002	Palomar	NEAT	·	1.5 km	MPC · JPL
252994	2002 QE_{105}	—	August 27, 2002	Palomar	NEAT	·	1.4 km	MPC · JPL
252995	2002 QJ_{105}	—	August 27, 2002	Palomar	NEAT	MAS	880 m	MPC · JPL
252996	2002 QK_{111}	—	August 27, 2002	Palomar	NEAT	·	1.5 km	MPC · JPL
252997	2002 QK_{114}	—	August 28, 2002	Palomar	NEAT	V	1.1 km	MPC · JPL
252998	2002 QU_{126}	—	August 30, 2002	Palomar	NEAT	·	1.5 km	MPC · JPL
252999	2002 QM_{134}	—	August 30, 2002	Palomar	NEAT	·	1.3 km	MPC · JPL
253000	2002 RO_{26}	—	September 4, 2002	Palomar	NEAT	EUN	1.4 km	MPC · JPL

back to top

== See also ==
- Meanings of minor-planet names: 252001–253000
