= List of minor planets: 373001–374000 =

The following is a partial list of minor planets, running from minor-planet number 373001 through 374000, inclusive. The primary data for this and other partial lists is based on JPL's "Small-Body Orbital Elements" and data available from the Minor Planet Center. Critical list information is also provided by the MPC, unless otherwise specified from Lowell Observatory. A detailed description of the table's columns and additional sources are given on the main page including a complete list of every page in this series, and a statistical break-up on the dynamical classification of minor planets.

Also see the summary list of all named bodies in numerical and alphabetical order, and the corresponding naming citations for the number range of this particular list. New namings may only be added to this list after official publication, as the preannouncement of names is condemned by the Working Group for Small Bodies Nomenclature of the International Astronomical Union.

Near-Earth obj.	MBA (inner)	MBA (outer)	Centaur
Mars-crosser	MBA (middle)	Jupiter trojan	Trans-Neptunian obj.
Unclassified

== 373001–373100 ==
Designation			Discovery			Properties		Ref
Permanent	Provisional	Named after	Date	Site	Discoverer(s)	Category	Diam.	Ref
373001	2011 CW_{96}	—	October 3, 2008	Kitt Peak	Spacewatch	·	2.9 km	MPC · JPL
373002	2011 CD_{97}	—	October 25, 2009	Kitt Peak	Spacewatch	WIT	1.0 km	MPC · JPL
373003	2011 CF_{106}	—	December 25, 2005	Kitt Peak	Spacewatch	·	1.8 km	MPC · JPL
373004	2011 CP_{107}	—	February 1, 2006	Mount Lemmon	Mount Lemmon Survey	·	1.5 km	MPC · JPL
373005	2011 DA	—	January 28, 2011	Mount Lemmon	Mount Lemmon Survey	TIR	3.2 km	MPC · JPL
373006	2011 DG_{2}	—	September 5, 2008	Kitt Peak	Spacewatch	VER	2.7 km	MPC · JPL
373007	2011 DL_{2}	—	September 25, 2008	Mount Lemmon	Mount Lemmon Survey	·	3.2 km	MPC · JPL
373008	2011 DT_{3}	—	September 28, 2003	Anderson Mesa	LONEOS	EOS	2.9 km	MPC · JPL
373009	2011 DV_{5}	—	March 30, 2000	Kitt Peak	Spacewatch	THM	2.4 km	MPC · JPL
373010	2011 DP_{8}	—	April 25, 2006	Kitt Peak	Spacewatch	·	3.3 km	MPC · JPL
373011	2011 DU_{8}	—	April 25, 2007	Mount Lemmon	Mount Lemmon Survey	·	2.7 km	MPC · JPL
373012	2011 DF_{9}	—	February 8, 2002	Kitt Peak	Spacewatch	·	1.3 km	MPC · JPL
373013	2011 DW_{9}	—	April 2, 2006	Kitt Peak	Spacewatch	EOS	2.2 km	MPC · JPL
373014	2011 DU_{10}	—	February 5, 2010	WISE	WISE	·	4.8 km	MPC · JPL
373015	2011 DC_{13}	—	September 4, 2008	Kitt Peak	Spacewatch	·	3.3 km	MPC · JPL
373016	2011 DO_{14}	—	January 24, 2007	Mount Lemmon	Mount Lemmon Survey	·	1.2 km	MPC · JPL
373017	2011 DR_{20}	—	January 4, 2011	Mount Lemmon	Mount Lemmon Survey	·	3.2 km	MPC · JPL
373018	2011 DE_{30}	—	September 17, 2004	Kitt Peak	Spacewatch	·	2.3 km	MPC · JPL
373019	2011 DK_{35}	—	October 1, 2005	Catalina	CSS	·	1.2 km	MPC · JPL
373020	2011 DA_{36}	—	January 10, 2006	Kitt Peak	Spacewatch	·	2.4 km	MPC · JPL
373021	2011 DO_{37}	—	October 8, 2004	Kitt Peak	Spacewatch	·	1.7 km	MPC · JPL
373022	2011 DO_{39}	—	January 7, 2006	Mount Lemmon	Mount Lemmon Survey	·	2.1 km	MPC · JPL
373023	2011 DF_{40}	—	September 28, 1997	Kitt Peak	Spacewatch	·	3.0 km	MPC · JPL
373024	2011 DA_{41}	—	February 14, 2005	Kitt Peak	Spacewatch	·	3.5 km	MPC · JPL
373025	2011 DG_{41}	—	March 10, 2005	Mount Lemmon	Mount Lemmon Survey	·	3.0 km	MPC · JPL
373026	2011 DD_{45}	—	February 3, 2001	Kitt Peak	Spacewatch	·	1.9 km	MPC · JPL
373027	2011 DM_{50}	—	December 10, 2004	Socorro	LINEAR	EOS	2.8 km	MPC · JPL
373028	2011 EF_{2}	—	January 31, 2006	Kitt Peak	Spacewatch	·	1.9 km	MPC · JPL
373029	2011 EZ_{7}	—	September 28, 2008	Mount Lemmon	Mount Lemmon Survey	VER	2.4 km	MPC · JPL
373030	2011 EM_{8}	—	August 30, 2005	Kitt Peak	Spacewatch	·	1.1 km	MPC · JPL
373031	2011 EF_{12}	—	November 3, 2010	Mount Lemmon	Mount Lemmon Survey	EUN	1.3 km	MPC · JPL
373032	2011 EM_{23}	—	October 30, 2005	Catalina	CSS	·	2.0 km	MPC · JPL
373033	2011 EO_{25}	—	March 3, 2005	Catalina	CSS	VER	3.6 km	MPC · JPL
373034	2011 EH_{26}	—	October 9, 2004	Kitt Peak	Spacewatch	KOR	1.7 km	MPC · JPL
373035	2011 EJ_{27}	—	December 22, 2005	Catalina	CSS	·	2.1 km	MPC · JPL
373036	2011 EU_{28}	—	October 21, 2008	Mount Lemmon	Mount Lemmon Survey	EOS	2.0 km	MPC · JPL
373037	2011 ER_{30}	—	January 15, 2005	Kitt Peak	Spacewatch	·	3.7 km	MPC · JPL
373038	2011 EO_{37}	—	March 6, 2011	Kitt Peak	Spacewatch	EOS	2.2 km	MPC · JPL
373039	2011 EK_{42}	—	February 1, 2006	Mount Lemmon	Mount Lemmon Survey	·	2.7 km	MPC · JPL
373040	2011 EV_{51}	—	October 4, 2002	Socorro	LINEAR	·	4.7 km	MPC · JPL
373041	2011 EB_{53}	—	April 16, 2010	WISE	WISE	·	3.8 km	MPC · JPL
373042	2011 ES_{54}	—	June 30, 1997	Kitt Peak	Spacewatch	·	3.0 km	MPC · JPL
373043	2011 EL_{55}	—	October 7, 2005	Catalina	CSS	·	1.8 km	MPC · JPL
373044	2011 EM_{59}	—	January 8, 2010	Mount Lemmon	Mount Lemmon Survey	·	2.4 km	MPC · JPL
373045	2011 EM_{60}	—	May 31, 2001	Kitt Peak	Spacewatch	EOS	2.4 km	MPC · JPL
373046	2011 EV_{62}	—	May 21, 2006	Kitt Peak	Spacewatch	VER	3.3 km	MPC · JPL
373047	2011 EU_{65}	—	October 29, 2005	Kitt Peak	Spacewatch	·	3.6 km	MPC · JPL
373048	2011 EF_{66}	—	October 10, 1999	Kitt Peak	Spacewatch	·	2.0 km	MPC · JPL
373049	2011 EZ_{66}	—	October 9, 2004	Socorro	LINEAR	·	2.0 km	MPC · JPL
373050	2011 EB_{72}	—	December 9, 2004	Kitt Peak	Spacewatch	AGN	1.6 km	MPC · JPL
373051	2011 EK_{74}	—	March 8, 2005	Kitt Peak	Spacewatch	·	3.0 km	MPC · JPL
373052	2011 EG_{81}	—	February 7, 2006	Mount Lemmon	Mount Lemmon Survey	·	2.4 km	MPC · JPL
373053	2011 EA_{82}	—	October 4, 2004	Kitt Peak	Spacewatch	·	2.3 km	MPC · JPL
373054	2011 EA_{84}	—	March 24, 2006	Kitt Peak	Spacewatch	·	2.2 km	MPC · JPL
373055	2011 EQ_{85}	—	December 16, 2004	Anderson Mesa	LONEOS	·	3.2 km	MPC · JPL
373056	2011 FE	—	September 6, 2008	Kitt Peak	Spacewatch	·	1.9 km	MPC · JPL
373057	2011 FA_{7}	—	October 2, 2008	Mount Lemmon	Mount Lemmon Survey	·	3.3 km	MPC · JPL
373058	2011 FK_{10}	—	March 3, 2006	Mount Lemmon	Mount Lemmon Survey	·	2.3 km	MPC · JPL
373059	2011 FY_{10}	—	January 13, 2002	Socorro	LINEAR	·	1.8 km	MPC · JPL
373060	2011 FT_{15}	—	September 24, 2009	Mount Lemmon	Mount Lemmon Survey	·	1.4 km	MPC · JPL
373061	2011 FV_{27}	—	September 23, 2008	Kitt Peak	Spacewatch	·	3.3 km	MPC · JPL
373062	2011 FM_{34}	—	September 27, 2009	Mount Lemmon	Mount Lemmon Survey	·	3.0 km	MPC · JPL
373063	2011 FC_{37}	—	March 2, 2006	Kitt Peak	Spacewatch	·	1.8 km	MPC · JPL
373064	2011 FJ_{37}	—	February 14, 2005	Kitt Peak	Spacewatch	·	3.1 km	MPC · JPL
373065	2011 FC_{41}	—	January 15, 2005	Kitt Peak	Spacewatch	·	3.2 km	MPC · JPL
373066	2011 FT_{43}	—	December 1, 2003	Kitt Peak	Spacewatch	EOS	2.3 km	MPC · JPL
373067	2011 FD_{51}	—	March 3, 2005	Catalina	CSS	·	3.1 km	MPC · JPL
373068	2011 FV_{55}	—	March 15, 1997	Kitt Peak	Spacewatch	·	1.9 km	MPC · JPL
373069	2011 FD_{63}	—	April 5, 2000	Socorro	LINEAR	·	3.9 km	MPC · JPL
373070	2011 FW_{65}	—	October 8, 2008	Kitt Peak	Spacewatch	HYG	2.6 km	MPC · JPL
373071	2011 FU_{66}	—	April 2, 2005	Catalina	CSS	·	4.8 km	MPC · JPL
373072	2011 FJ_{69}	—	December 17, 2009	Mount Lemmon	Mount Lemmon Survey	·	3.7 km	MPC · JPL
373073	2011 FE_{72}	—	February 11, 2011	Catalina	CSS	·	3.5 km	MPC · JPL
373074	2011 FM_{74}	—	September 16, 2004	Kitt Peak	Spacewatch	NEM	1.9 km	MPC · JPL
373075	2011 FU_{81}	—	January 28, 2006	Kitt Peak	Spacewatch	KOR	1.6 km	MPC · JPL
373076	2011 FE_{82}	—	April 11, 2005	Kitt Peak	Spacewatch	CYB	3.8 km	MPC · JPL
373077	2011 FH_{88}	—	December 10, 2004	Kitt Peak	Spacewatch	KOR	1.6 km	MPC · JPL
373078	2011 FE_{90}	—	February 1, 2000	Kitt Peak	Spacewatch	·	4.5 km	MPC · JPL
373079	2011 FB_{91}	—	February 20, 2006	Kitt Peak	Spacewatch	KOR	1.6 km	MPC · JPL
373080	2011 FJ_{95}	—	April 9, 2006	Kitt Peak	Spacewatch	·	2.5 km	MPC · JPL
373081	2011 FL_{95}	—	June 8, 2007	Kitt Peak	Spacewatch	·	2.2 km	MPC · JPL
373082	2011 FA_{97}	—	October 17, 2003	Kitt Peak	Spacewatch	·	3.2 km	MPC · JPL
373083	2011 FZ_{97}	—	March 5, 1994	Kitt Peak	Spacewatch	·	3.8 km	MPC · JPL
373084	2011 FL_{102}	—	November 27, 2009	Mount Lemmon	Mount Lemmon Survey	·	2.9 km	MPC · JPL
373085	2011 FD_{120}	—	April 9, 2005	Kitt Peak	Spacewatch	ELF	3.2 km	MPC · JPL
373086	2011 FR_{126}	—	December 12, 2004	Kitt Peak	Spacewatch	NAE	4.6 km	MPC · JPL
373087	2011 FM_{130}	—	January 13, 2005	Kitt Peak	Spacewatch	·	3.4 km	MPC · JPL
373088	2011 FO_{132}	—	October 9, 2008	Mount Lemmon	Mount Lemmon Survey	·	2.2 km	MPC · JPL
373089	2011 FV_{132}	—	January 28, 2000	Kitt Peak	Spacewatch	·	2.0 km	MPC · JPL
373090	2011 FD_{134}	—	September 21, 2009	Kitt Peak	Spacewatch	·	1.6 km	MPC · JPL
373091	2011 FV_{134}	—	October 10, 2004	Kitt Peak	Spacewatch	AGN	1.5 km	MPC · JPL
373092	2011 FB_{141}	—	April 6, 2010	WISE	WISE	·	4.9 km	MPC · JPL
373093	2011 FO_{146}	—	March 5, 2006	Kitt Peak	Spacewatch	·	2.5 km	MPC · JPL
373094	2011 FR_{147}	—	December 18, 2003	Kitt Peak	Spacewatch	·	5.4 km	MPC · JPL
373095	2011 FB_{148}	—	February 1, 2005	Catalina	CSS	·	4.1 km	MPC · JPL
373096	2011 FU_{148}	—	October 20, 2003	Kitt Peak	Spacewatch	THM	3.7 km	MPC · JPL
373097	2011 FR_{150}	—	February 9, 2005	Mount Lemmon	Mount Lemmon Survey	·	4.6 km	MPC · JPL
373098	2011 FN_{156}	—	September 28, 2003	Kitt Peak	Spacewatch	EOS	1.9 km	MPC · JPL
373099	2011 GX_{9}	—	October 7, 2004	Kitt Peak	Spacewatch	·	2.9 km	MPC · JPL
373100	2011 GS_{17}	—	January 15, 2005	Kitt Peak	Spacewatch	·	1.9 km	MPC · JPL

== 373101–373200 ==
back to top

Designation			Discovery			Properties		Ref
Permanent	Provisional	Named after	Date	Site	Discoverer(s)	Category	Diam.	Ref
373101	2011 GW_{21}	—	January 6, 2010	Kitt Peak	Spacewatch	·	3.2 km	MPC · JPL
373102	2011 GK_{36}	—	October 19, 2003	Kitt Peak	Spacewatch	·	3.1 km	MPC · JPL
373103	2011 GT_{36}	—	March 11, 2005	Catalina	CSS	·	3.5 km	MPC · JPL
373104	2011 GZ_{36}	—	May 19, 2006	Catalina	CSS	·	3.6 km	MPC · JPL
373105	2011 GX_{38}	—	March 11, 2007	Catalina	CSS	·	1.4 km	MPC · JPL
373106	2011 GH_{42}	—	March 9, 2005	Mount Lemmon	Mount Lemmon Survey	·	3.7 km	MPC · JPL
373107	2011 GV_{44}	—	March 26, 2006	Mount Lemmon	Mount Lemmon Survey	·	2.7 km	MPC · JPL
373108	2011 GE_{45}	—	March 5, 2006	Kitt Peak	Spacewatch	·	2.4 km	MPC · JPL
373109	2011 GK_{54}	—	September 7, 2008	Mount Lemmon	Mount Lemmon Survey	KOR	1.3 km	MPC · JPL
373110	2011 GB_{56}	—	January 19, 2005	Kitt Peak	Spacewatch	EOS	2.4 km	MPC · JPL
373111	2011 GS_{59}	—	August 13, 2002	Kitt Peak	Spacewatch	EOS	2.5 km	MPC · JPL
373112	2011 GR_{62}	—	January 16, 2005	Catalina	CSS	·	4.6 km	MPC · JPL
373113	2011 GG_{75}	—	October 7, 2004	Anderson Mesa	LONEOS	·	3.1 km	MPC · JPL
373114	2011 GA_{76}	—	October 7, 2008	Mount Lemmon	Mount Lemmon Survey	·	3.8 km	MPC · JPL
373115	2011 GJ_{83}	—	September 30, 2005	Anderson Mesa	LONEOS	T_{j} (2.98) · HIL · 3:2	7.5 km	MPC · JPL
373116	2011 GZ_{84}	—	March 16, 2005	Catalina	CSS	EOS	2.3 km	MPC · JPL
373117	2011 GQ_{87}	—	May 23, 2006	Kitt Peak	Spacewatch	·	4.4 km	MPC · JPL
373118	2011 GU_{87}	—	February 2, 2005	Catalina	CSS	LIX	3.9 km	MPC · JPL
373119	2011 HX_{4}	—	December 30, 2005	Catalina	CSS	EUN	1.6 km	MPC · JPL
373120	2011 HQ_{10}	—	May 1, 2006	Kitt Peak	Spacewatch	·	3.2 km	MPC · JPL
373121	2011 HJ_{37}	—	March 9, 2005	Mount Lemmon	Mount Lemmon Survey	·	4.4 km	MPC · JPL
373122	2011 HW_{43}	—	March 11, 2005	Kitt Peak	Spacewatch	·	3.2 km	MPC · JPL
373123	2011 HC_{65}	—	March 16, 2005	Mount Lemmon	Mount Lemmon Survey	·	3.7 km	MPC · JPL
373124	2011 HE_{65}	—	March 16, 2005	Kitt Peak	Spacewatch	·	3.4 km	MPC · JPL
373125	2011 HO_{68}	—	March 13, 2005	Kitt Peak	Spacewatch	·	3.1 km	MPC · JPL
373126	2011 HU_{70}	—	April 24, 2006	Anderson Mesa	LONEOS	·	2.4 km	MPC · JPL
373127	2011 HA_{73}	—	March 8, 2005	Kitt Peak	Spacewatch	·	2.9 km	MPC · JPL
373128	2011 HE_{75}	—	September 13, 2007	Catalina	CSS	·	4.5 km	MPC · JPL
373129	2011 HK_{78}	—	May 21, 2006	Kitt Peak	Spacewatch	EOS	2.7 km	MPC · JPL
373130	2011 HL_{86}	—	December 18, 2001	Socorro	LINEAR	(5)	1.1 km	MPC · JPL
373131	2011 HM_{87}	—	January 7, 2010	Kitt Peak	Spacewatch	·	2.8 km	MPC · JPL
373132	2011 HX_{98}	—	March 17, 2005	Kitt Peak	Spacewatch	·	2.9 km	MPC · JPL
373133	2011 HP_{102}	—	May 26, 2006	Catalina	CSS	·	3.5 km	MPC · JPL
373134	2011 KV_{18}	—	April 11, 1999	Kitt Peak	Spacewatch	·	3.3 km	MPC · JPL
373135	2011 SD_{173}	—	September 24, 2011	Mount Lemmon	Mount Lemmon Survey	APO +1km · PHA	1.0 km	MPC · JPL
373136	2011 YF_{6}	—	February 8, 2008	Mount Lemmon	Mount Lemmon Survey	PHO	3.0 km	MPC · JPL
373137	2011 YA_{11}	—	December 22, 2003	Kitt Peak	Spacewatch	H	640 m	MPC · JPL
373138	2011 YF_{24}	—	December 25, 2011	Kitt Peak	Spacewatch	H	520 m	MPC · JPL
373139	2011 YA_{56}	—	November 2, 2007	Kitt Peak	Spacewatch	·	1.3 km	MPC · JPL
373140	2012 AH_{17}	—	January 18, 2004	Catalina	CSS	H	720 m	MPC · JPL
373141	2012 BN	—	February 18, 2008	Mount Lemmon	Mount Lemmon Survey	·	2.3 km	MPC · JPL
373142	2012 BU_{9}	—	March 8, 2005	Kitt Peak	Spacewatch	·	1.0 km	MPC · JPL
373143	2012 BC_{15}	—	December 15, 2007	Kitt Peak	Spacewatch	·	1.3 km	MPC · JPL
373144	2012 BG_{15}	—	May 11, 2002	Socorro	LINEAR	·	850 m	MPC · JPL
373145	2012 BO_{24}	—	March 20, 2007	Catalina	CSS	H	630 m	MPC · JPL
373146	2012 BJ_{26}	—	October 3, 2005	Siding Spring	SSS	H	670 m	MPC · JPL
373147	2012 BX_{27}	—	September 15, 2010	Mount Lemmon	Mount Lemmon Survey	·	720 m	MPC · JPL
373148	2012 BU_{47}	—	April 5, 2005	Catalina	CSS	ERI	1.6 km	MPC · JPL
373149	2012 BJ_{53}	—	October 9, 2007	Kitt Peak	Spacewatch	·	630 m	MPC · JPL
373150	2012 BG_{55}	—	April 6, 2005	Catalina	CSS	·	1.4 km	MPC · JPL
373151	2012 BF_{122}	—	March 11, 2005	Kitt Peak	Spacewatch	NYS	920 m	MPC · JPL
373152	2012 BM_{122}	—	September 29, 2003	Kitt Peak	Spacewatch	·	690 m	MPC · JPL
373153	2012 BM_{132}	—	December 29, 2011	Catalina	CSS	BAR	2.0 km	MPC · JPL
373154	2012 BY_{148}	—	February 7, 2008	Kitt Peak	Spacewatch	·	1.2 km	MPC · JPL
373155	2012 CJ_{7}	—	March 21, 2002	Kitt Peak	Spacewatch	·	600 m	MPC · JPL
373156	2012 CL_{18}	—	May 26, 2009	Catalina	CSS	NYS	1.2 km	MPC · JPL
373157	2012 CR_{19}	—	January 13, 2005	Kitt Peak	Spacewatch	·	910 m	MPC · JPL
373158	2012 CY_{29}	—	March 26, 2006	Kitt Peak	Spacewatch	·	670 m	MPC · JPL
373159	2012 CT_{47}	—	October 8, 2007	Mount Lemmon	Mount Lemmon Survey	·	600 m	MPC · JPL
373160	2012 CU_{51}	—	May 11, 2005	Mount Lemmon	Mount Lemmon Survey	NYS	1.0 km	MPC · JPL
373161	2012 CE_{53}	—	February 2, 2005	Kitt Peak	Spacewatch	·	950 m	MPC · JPL
373162	2012 CH_{57}	—	March 28, 2009	Siding Spring	SSS	·	860 m	MPC · JPL
373163	2012 DK	—	February 1, 2012	Kitt Peak	Spacewatch	·	1.2 km	MPC · JPL
373164	2012 DS_{1}	—	June 27, 2005	Mount Lemmon	Mount Lemmon Survey	NYS	1.2 km	MPC · JPL
373165	2012 DO_{4}	—	January 17, 2005	Kitt Peak	Spacewatch	PHO	970 m	MPC · JPL
373166	2012 DX_{6}	—	April 14, 2008	Catalina	CSS	JUN	1.2 km	MPC · JPL
373167	2012 DS_{13}	—	September 26, 2006	Mount Lemmon	Mount Lemmon Survey	·	1.3 km	MPC · JPL
373168	2012 DH_{15}	—	March 7, 2003	Kitt Peak	Spacewatch	·	2.5 km	MPC · JPL
373169	2012 DU_{19}	—	January 15, 2005	Kitt Peak	Spacewatch	·	930 m	MPC · JPL
373170	2012 DW_{19}	—	July 8, 2004	Siding Spring	SSS	·	2.9 km	MPC · JPL
373171	2012 DW_{25}	—	March 16, 2005	Catalina	CSS	(2076)	760 m	MPC · JPL
373172	2012 DO_{27}	—	April 11, 2005	Kitt Peak	Spacewatch	·	1.0 km	MPC · JPL
373173	2012 DB_{30}	—	February 9, 2005	Kitt Peak	Spacewatch	·	840 m	MPC · JPL
373174	2012 DT_{31}	—	January 19, 2005	Kitt Peak	Spacewatch	·	770 m	MPC · JPL
373175	2012 DC_{32}	—	March 18, 2005	Catalina	CSS	·	1.0 km	MPC · JPL
373176	2012 DX_{33}	—	November 12, 2007	Mount Lemmon	Mount Lemmon Survey	·	760 m	MPC · JPL
373177	2012 DT_{35}	—	April 4, 2005	Kitt Peak	Spacewatch	·	830 m	MPC · JPL
373178	2012 DO_{38}	—	February 23, 2012	Kitt Peak	Spacewatch	·	1.5 km	MPC · JPL
373179	2012 DQ_{43}	—	May 30, 2006	Mount Lemmon	Mount Lemmon Survey	·	850 m	MPC · JPL
373180	2012 DN_{46}	—	February 10, 2008	Kitt Peak	Spacewatch	MAS	730 m	MPC · JPL
373181	2012 DO_{46}	—	November 9, 2007	Kitt Peak	Spacewatch	·	710 m	MPC · JPL
373182	2012 DB_{47}	—	September 25, 2009	Kitt Peak	Spacewatch	·	2.0 km	MPC · JPL
373183	2012 DT_{47}	—	August 28, 2006	Kitt Peak	Spacewatch	·	700 m	MPC · JPL
373184	2012 DL_{53}	—	April 4, 2008	Kitt Peak	Spacewatch	·	1.7 km	MPC · JPL
373185	2012 DM_{53}	—	September 26, 1992	Kitt Peak	Spacewatch	·	1.6 km	MPC · JPL
373186	2012 DX_{58}	—	March 16, 2001	Kitt Peak	Spacewatch	·	1.5 km	MPC · JPL
373187	2012 DG_{59}	—	March 11, 2005	Kitt Peak	Spacewatch	·	760 m	MPC · JPL
373188	2012 DR_{59}	—	December 31, 2007	Mount Lemmon	Mount Lemmon Survey	(6769)	1.2 km	MPC · JPL
373189	2012 DD_{65}	—	February 7, 2002	Socorro	LINEAR	·	700 m	MPC · JPL
373190	2012 DH_{67}	—	July 12, 2005	Mount Lemmon	Mount Lemmon Survey	·	1.4 km	MPC · JPL
373191	2012 DD_{71}	—	April 24, 2009	Mount Lemmon	Mount Lemmon Survey	·	660 m	MPC · JPL
373192	2012 DK_{74}	—	March 14, 2005	Mount Lemmon	Mount Lemmon Survey	·	910 m	MPC · JPL
373193	2012 DH_{75}	—	June 10, 2005	Kitt Peak	Spacewatch	·	1.1 km	MPC · JPL
373194	2012 DH_{76}	—	January 17, 2005	Kitt Peak	Spacewatch	·	610 m	MPC · JPL
373195	2012 DN_{76}	—	November 4, 2007	Kitt Peak	Spacewatch	·	700 m	MPC · JPL
373196	2012 DZ_{77}	—	December 14, 2010	Mount Lemmon	Mount Lemmon Survey	·	2.9 km	MPC · JPL
373197	2012 DH_{78}	—	October 31, 2010	Kitt Peak	Spacewatch	·	1.1 km	MPC · JPL
373198	2012 DD_{79}	—	October 11, 2010	Mount Lemmon	Mount Lemmon Survey	·	1.4 km	MPC · JPL
373199	2012 DU_{81}	—	October 10, 2010	Mount Lemmon	Mount Lemmon Survey	·	860 m	MPC · JPL
373200	2012 DF_{82}	—	February 10, 2008	Kitt Peak	Spacewatch	MAS	740 m	MPC · JPL

== 373201–373300 ==
back to top

Designation			Discovery			Properties		Ref
Permanent	Provisional	Named after	Date	Site	Discoverer(s)	Category	Diam.	Ref
373201	2012 DF_{83}	—	March 4, 2005	Kitt Peak	Spacewatch	·	900 m	MPC · JPL
373202	2012 DJ_{86}	—	March 9, 2005	Catalina	CSS	·	1.8 km	MPC · JPL
373203	2012 DS_{86}	—	March 12, 2002	Kitt Peak	Spacewatch	·	700 m	MPC · JPL
373204	2012 DO_{88}	—	September 17, 2006	Kitt Peak	Spacewatch	V	660 m	MPC · JPL
373205	2012 DV_{90}	—	March 16, 2005	Mount Lemmon	Mount Lemmon Survey	·	1.0 km	MPC · JPL
373206	2012 DB_{91}	—	August 4, 2003	Socorro	LINEAR	·	750 m	MPC · JPL
373207	2012 DM_{94}	—	March 4, 2005	Kitt Peak	Spacewatch	·	920 m	MPC · JPL
373208	2012 EJ_{2}	—	February 8, 2002	Kitt Peak	Spacewatch	·	610 m	MPC · JPL
373209	2012 EK_{4}	—	March 28, 2008	Kitt Peak	Spacewatch	·	1.3 km	MPC · JPL
373210	2012 EH_{8}	—	September 19, 2003	Kitt Peak	Spacewatch	·	770 m	MPC · JPL
373211	2012 FE_{2}	—	October 17, 2010	Mount Lemmon	Mount Lemmon Survey	·	830 m	MPC · JPL
373212	2012 FF_{7}	—	January 18, 2008	Kitt Peak	Spacewatch	·	1.3 km	MPC · JPL
373213	2012 FO_{25}	—	November 10, 2005	Kitt Peak	Spacewatch	·	2.3 km	MPC · JPL
373214	2012 FD_{30}	—	May 18, 2001	Kitt Peak	Spacewatch	·	1.5 km	MPC · JPL
373215	2012 FE_{31}	—	May 9, 2005	Kitt Peak	Spacewatch	V	680 m	MPC · JPL
373216	2012 FX_{33}	—	June 15, 2005	Mount Lemmon	Mount Lemmon Survey	·	1.4 km	MPC · JPL
373217	2012 FJ_{36}	—	February 12, 2008	Mount Lemmon	Mount Lemmon Survey	·	1.1 km	MPC · JPL
373218	2012 FK_{40}	—	April 16, 2005	Kitt Peak	Spacewatch	·	920 m	MPC · JPL
373219	2012 FL_{40}	—	February 10, 2008	Kitt Peak	Spacewatch	·	1.1 km	MPC · JPL
373220	2012 FY_{40}	—	January 14, 2008	Kitt Peak	Spacewatch	MAS	700 m	MPC · JPL
373221	2012 FT_{54}	—	April 5, 2008	Kitt Peak	Spacewatch	·	1.3 km	MPC · JPL
373222	2012 FV_{54}	—	April 6, 2005	Kitt Peak	Spacewatch	·	820 m	MPC · JPL
373223	2012 FG_{56}	—	May 28, 1998	Kitt Peak	Spacewatch	·	910 m	MPC · JPL
373224	2012 FG_{57}	—	March 19, 2001	Anderson Mesa	LONEOS	·	1.1 km	MPC · JPL
373225	2012 FM_{60}	—	April 14, 2008	Mount Lemmon	Mount Lemmon Survey	·	1.3 km	MPC · JPL
373226	2012 FG_{61}	—	April 5, 2008	Kitt Peak	Spacewatch	·	1.2 km	MPC · JPL
373227	2012 FS_{61}	—	February 8, 2008	Mount Lemmon	Mount Lemmon Survey	NYS	950 m	MPC · JPL
373228	2012 FW_{61}	—	June 14, 2004	Kitt Peak	Spacewatch	·	1.9 km	MPC · JPL
373229	2012 FG_{65}	—	March 31, 2003	Kitt Peak	Spacewatch	·	2.1 km	MPC · JPL
373230	2012 FY_{68}	—	December 22, 2003	Kitt Peak	Spacewatch	·	1.4 km	MPC · JPL
373231	2012 FV_{69}	—	April 16, 2005	Kitt Peak	Spacewatch	·	970 m	MPC · JPL
373232	2012 FV_{72}	—	March 12, 2005	Kitt Peak	Spacewatch	PHO	1.1 km	MPC · JPL
373233	2012 FL_{73}	—	January 30, 2004	Kitt Peak	Spacewatch	·	1.5 km	MPC · JPL
373234	2012 FE_{74}	—	December 13, 2010	Mount Lemmon	Mount Lemmon Survey	·	2.7 km	MPC · JPL
373235	2012 FN_{74}	—	September 22, 2009	Mount Lemmon	Mount Lemmon Survey	·	1.9 km	MPC · JPL
373236	2012 FA_{75}	—	November 9, 2009	Mount Lemmon	Mount Lemmon Survey	·	4.0 km	MPC · JPL
373237	2012 FC_{76}	—	September 30, 2006	Mount Lemmon	Mount Lemmon Survey	·	1.5 km	MPC · JPL
373238	2012 FA_{77}	—	November 18, 2007	Mount Lemmon	Mount Lemmon Survey	·	790 m	MPC · JPL
373239	2012 FR_{77}	—	September 16, 2009	Kitt Peak	Spacewatch	·	1.3 km	MPC · JPL
373240	2012 FK_{80}	—	January 10, 2008	Kitt Peak	Spacewatch	·	960 m	MPC · JPL
373241	2012 GQ_{5}	—	March 16, 2002	Kitt Peak	Spacewatch	·	900 m	MPC · JPL
373242	2012 GC_{7}	—	April 23, 2007	Catalina	CSS	H	620 m	MPC · JPL
373243	2012 GU_{8}	—	March 24, 2003	Kitt Peak	Spacewatch	·	1.9 km	MPC · JPL
373244	2012 GK_{9}	—	June 17, 2005	Kitt Peak	Spacewatch	·	1.7 km	MPC · JPL
373245	2012 GR_{9}	—	March 27, 2008	Mount Lemmon	Mount Lemmon Survey	·	1.6 km	MPC · JPL
373246	2012 GS_{9}	—	May 19, 2005	Mount Lemmon	Mount Lemmon Survey	·	1.1 km	MPC · JPL
373247	2012 GC_{10}	—	March 29, 2012	Mount Lemmon	Mount Lemmon Survey	·	1.6 km	MPC · JPL
373248	2012 GQ_{18}	—	November 3, 2010	Mount Lemmon	Mount Lemmon Survey	·	1.2 km	MPC · JPL
373249	2012 GW_{19}	—	October 25, 2005	Kitt Peak	Spacewatch	(11882)	1.7 km	MPC · JPL
373250	2012 GG_{21}	—	February 25, 2006	Mount Lemmon	Mount Lemmon Survey	·	1.8 km	MPC · JPL
373251	2012 GR_{21}	—	October 11, 2004	Kitt Peak	Spacewatch	·	2.0 km	MPC · JPL
373252	2012 GW_{22}	—	February 10, 2011	Mount Lemmon	Mount Lemmon Survey	EOS	2.3 km	MPC · JPL
373253	2012 GA_{31}	—	February 17, 2004	Kitt Peak	Spacewatch	NYS	1.3 km	MPC · JPL
373254	2012 GB_{31}	—	October 20, 2003	Kitt Peak	Spacewatch	·	920 m	MPC · JPL
373255	2012 GB_{32}	—	March 2, 2008	Catalina	CSS	·	1.5 km	MPC · JPL
373256	2012 GC_{33}	—	October 9, 2004	Kitt Peak	Spacewatch	(13314)	2.9 km	MPC · JPL
373257	2012 GW_{33}	—	February 14, 2005	Catalina	CSS	·	1.2 km	MPC · JPL
373258	2012 GN_{38}	—	February 2, 2006	Kitt Peak	Spacewatch	EOS	1.7 km	MPC · JPL
373259	2012 GE_{39}	—	May 29, 1995	Kitt Peak	Spacewatch	·	1.6 km	MPC · JPL
373260	2012 HF_{3}	—	February 10, 2002	Kitt Peak	Spacewatch	·	2.5 km	MPC · JPL
373261	2012 HQ_{3}	—	May 10, 2007	Mount Lemmon	Mount Lemmon Survey	·	2.0 km	MPC · JPL
373262	2012 HW_{5}	—	January 13, 2011	Kitt Peak	Spacewatch	·	3.4 km	MPC · JPL
373263	2012 HH_{6}	—	January 8, 2002	Kitt Peak	Spacewatch	·	1.9 km	MPC · JPL
373264	2012 HX_{6}	—	November 11, 2007	Mount Lemmon	Mount Lemmon Survey	NYS	1.3 km	MPC · JPL
373265	2012 HD_{7}	—	January 17, 2005	Kitt Peak	Spacewatch	·	640 m	MPC · JPL
373266	2012 HB_{11}	—	June 29, 2004	Siding Spring	SSS	ADE	2.4 km	MPC · JPL
373267	2012 HW_{11}	—	May 15, 1996	Kitt Peak	Spacewatch	·	3.1 km	MPC · JPL
373268	2012 HZ_{12}	—	February 23, 2006	Anderson Mesa	LONEOS	·	4.6 km	MPC · JPL
373269	2012 HM_{18}	—	February 16, 2001	Socorro	LINEAR	·	3.3 km	MPC · JPL
373270	2012 HB_{19}	—	December 12, 2004	Campo Imperatore	CINEOS	EOS	2.4 km	MPC · JPL
373271	2012 HN_{23}	—	October 20, 2007	Mount Lemmon	Mount Lemmon Survey	·	630 m	MPC · JPL
373272	2012 HO_{23}	—	October 8, 1999	Kitt Peak	Spacewatch	V	700 m	MPC · JPL
373273	2012 HF_{26}	—	March 11, 2007	Mount Lemmon	Mount Lemmon Survey	KOR	1.2 km	MPC · JPL
373274	2012 HN_{28}	—	May 5, 2008	Mount Lemmon	Mount Lemmon Survey	·	1.9 km	MPC · JPL
373275	2012 HQ_{34}	—	December 26, 2006	Kitt Peak	Spacewatch	MIS	3.0 km	MPC · JPL
373276	2012 HU_{35}	—	April 11, 1999	Kitt Peak	Spacewatch	·	1.3 km	MPC · JPL
373277	2012 HC_{36}	—	December 4, 2007	Kitt Peak	Spacewatch	·	760 m	MPC · JPL
373278	2012 HL_{39}	—	February 2, 2006	Mount Lemmon	Mount Lemmon Survey	TIR	4.1 km	MPC · JPL
373279	2012 HE_{40}	—	September 3, 2008	Kitt Peak	Spacewatch	(32418)	2.7 km	MPC · JPL
373280	2012 HL_{40}	—	April 30, 2008	Catalina	CSS	·	3.7 km	MPC · JPL
373281	2012 HQ_{41}	—	November 3, 2010	Mount Lemmon	Mount Lemmon Survey	·	2.3 km	MPC · JPL
373282	2012 HO_{43}	—	November 5, 2005	Mount Lemmon	Mount Lemmon Survey	·	1.9 km	MPC · JPL
373283	2012 HD_{48}	—	September 29, 2008	Catalina	CSS	·	4.1 km	MPC · JPL
373284	2012 HO_{48}	—	June 16, 2001	Kitt Peak	Spacewatch	VER	2.5 km	MPC · JPL
373285	2012 HP_{48}	—	June 7, 2008	Kitt Peak	Spacewatch	·	2.7 km	MPC · JPL
373286	2012 HC_{49}	—	May 13, 2007	Mount Lemmon	Mount Lemmon Survey	EOS	2.0 km	MPC · JPL
373287	2012 HP_{50}	—	September 7, 2004	Kitt Peak	Spacewatch	·	1.8 km	MPC · JPL
373288	2012 HN_{51}	—	March 11, 2007	Kitt Peak	Spacewatch	GEF	1.5 km	MPC · JPL
373289	2012 HV_{52}	—	October 19, 2003	Kitt Peak	Spacewatch	·	3.2 km	MPC · JPL
373290	2012 HF_{53}	—	September 6, 2008	Kitt Peak	Spacewatch	·	1.9 km	MPC · JPL
373291	2012 HO_{54}	—	January 23, 2006	Kitt Peak	Spacewatch	·	3.5 km	MPC · JPL
373292	2012 HJ_{56}	—	October 14, 2010	Mount Lemmon	Mount Lemmon Survey	·	1.0 km	MPC · JPL
373293	2012 HZ_{56}	—	April 24, 1995	Kitt Peak	Spacewatch	·	1.5 km	MPC · JPL
373294	2012 HR_{58}	—	January 16, 2007	Mount Lemmon	Mount Lemmon Survey	·	1.2 km	MPC · JPL
373295	2012 HA_{60}	—	March 26, 2007	Kitt Peak	Spacewatch	·	2.0 km	MPC · JPL
373296	2012 HY_{60}	—	October 25, 2005	Mount Lemmon	Mount Lemmon Survey	·	1.3 km	MPC · JPL
373297	2012 HX_{67}	—	August 28, 1995	Kitt Peak	Spacewatch	·	2.1 km	MPC · JPL
373298	2012 HZ_{68}	—	May 13, 2007	Mount Lemmon	Mount Lemmon Survey	·	2.5 km	MPC · JPL
373299	2012 HJ_{71}	—	January 10, 2011	Mount Lemmon	Mount Lemmon Survey	·	1.9 km	MPC · JPL
373300	2012 HQ_{72}	—	November 6, 1999	Kitt Peak	Spacewatch	·	2.8 km	MPC · JPL

== 373301–373400 ==
back to top

Designation			Discovery			Properties		Ref
Permanent	Provisional	Named after	Date	Site	Discoverer(s)	Category	Diam.	Ref
373301	2012 HA_{75}	—	March 16, 2012	Kitt Peak	Spacewatch	·	1.6 km	MPC · JPL
373302	2012 HL_{77}	—	September 18, 1995	Kitt Peak	Spacewatch	·	1.6 km	MPC · JPL
373303	2012 HM_{80}	—	December 26, 2009	Kitt Peak	Spacewatch	·	7.0 km	MPC · JPL
373304	2012 HR_{80}	—	March 23, 2004	Kitt Peak	Spacewatch	·	1.5 km	MPC · JPL
373305	2012 HH_{82}	—	February 23, 2007	Catalina	CSS	(14916)	2.7 km	MPC · JPL
373306	2012 JT	—	April 12, 1999	Socorro	LINEAR	·	2.5 km	MPC · JPL
373307	2012 JX_{1}	—	May 5, 2008	Mount Lemmon	Mount Lemmon Survey	·	1.1 km	MPC · JPL
373308	2012 JZ_{1}	—	September 27, 2008	Mount Lemmon	Mount Lemmon Survey	HYG	3.4 km	MPC · JPL
373309	2012 JG_{2}	—	October 23, 2009	Mount Lemmon	Mount Lemmon Survey	·	2.4 km	MPC · JPL
373310	2012 JB_{3}	—	October 24, 2005	Kitt Peak	Spacewatch	(5)	1.3 km	MPC · JPL
373311	2012 JW_{6}	—	April 26, 2008	Mount Lemmon	Mount Lemmon Survey	·	1.2 km	MPC · JPL
373312	2012 JK_{7}	—	October 2, 2006	Mount Lemmon	Mount Lemmon Survey	·	1.3 km	MPC · JPL
373313	2012 JP_{7}	—	October 5, 2004	Kitt Peak	Spacewatch	·	2.0 km	MPC · JPL
373314	2012 JC_{8}	—	January 11, 2011	Catalina	CSS	·	1.5 km	MPC · JPL
373315	2012 JE_{8}	—	March 10, 2007	Mount Lemmon	Mount Lemmon Survey	·	1.5 km	MPC · JPL
373316	2012 JP_{8}	—	October 27, 2009	Kitt Peak	Spacewatch	·	2.6 km	MPC · JPL
373317	2012 JP_{9}	—	November 9, 2009	Mount Lemmon	Mount Lemmon Survey	·	3.7 km	MPC · JPL
373318	2012 JR_{9}	—	December 2, 2005	Kitt Peak	Spacewatch	AGN	1.6 km	MPC · JPL
373319	2012 JD_{13}	—	September 27, 2008	Mount Lemmon	Mount Lemmon Survey	·	3.2 km	MPC · JPL
373320	2012 JK_{15}	—	October 27, 2005	Kitt Peak	Spacewatch	·	1.6 km	MPC · JPL
373321	2012 JL_{15}	—	April 19, 2007	Kitt Peak	Spacewatch	KOR	1.3 km	MPC · JPL
373322	2012 JQ_{16}	—	November 23, 2006	Kitt Peak	Spacewatch	·	1.2 km	MPC · JPL
373323	2012 JD_{19}	—	September 10, 2004	Kitt Peak	Spacewatch	·	2.2 km	MPC · JPL
373324	2012 JW_{19}	—	August 8, 2007	Socorro	LINEAR	·	5.4 km	MPC · JPL
373325	2012 JG_{20}	—	October 7, 2000	Kitt Peak	Spacewatch	·	1.8 km	MPC · JPL
373326	2012 JX_{20}	—	November 21, 2005	Kitt Peak	Spacewatch	·	1.7 km	MPC · JPL
373327	2012 JR_{21}	—	January 17, 2007	Kitt Peak	Spacewatch	·	1.6 km	MPC · JPL
373328	2012 JY_{21}	—	August 31, 2005	Kitt Peak	Spacewatch	·	1.9 km	MPC · JPL
373329	2012 JW_{23}	—	December 1, 2005	Kitt Peak	Spacewatch	·	2.2 km	MPC · JPL
373330	2012 JZ_{24}	—	December 10, 2001	Kitt Peak	Spacewatch	EUN	1.7 km	MPC · JPL
373331	2012 JG_{25}	—	April 19, 1999	Kitt Peak	Spacewatch	MAR	1.4 km	MPC · JPL
373332	2012 JJ_{26}	—	February 27, 2006	Mount Lemmon	Mount Lemmon Survey	·	2.8 km	MPC · JPL
373333	2012 JE_{30}	—	March 14, 2007	Mount Lemmon	Mount Lemmon Survey	·	2.4 km	MPC · JPL
373334	2012 JZ_{31}	—	December 24, 2005	Kitt Peak	Spacewatch	HOF	2.9 km	MPC · JPL
373335	2012 JE_{32}	—	October 6, 2004	Kitt Peak	Spacewatch	AGN	1.2 km	MPC · JPL
373336	2012 JC_{34}	—	November 9, 2009	Mount Lemmon	Mount Lemmon Survey	·	2.3 km	MPC · JPL
373337	2012 JL_{34}	—	November 22, 2005	Kitt Peak	Spacewatch	·	1.4 km	MPC · JPL
373338	2012 JW_{37}	—	January 22, 2006	Mount Lemmon	Mount Lemmon Survey	·	2.0 km	MPC · JPL
373339	2012 JQ_{38}	—	December 30, 2005	Kitt Peak	Spacewatch	BRA	1.5 km	MPC · JPL
373340	2012 JF_{40}	—	March 28, 1993	Kitt Peak	Spacewatch	·	2.0 km	MPC · JPL
373341	2012 JN_{41}	—	September 20, 2008	Mount Lemmon	Mount Lemmon Survey	·	1.2 km	MPC · JPL
373342	2012 JG_{43}	—	October 24, 2005	Kitt Peak	Spacewatch	·	1.3 km	MPC · JPL
373343	2012 JY_{48}	—	January 8, 2011	Mount Lemmon	Mount Lemmon Survey	·	1.3 km	MPC · JPL
373344	2012 JC_{51}	—	May 16, 2007	Kitt Peak	Spacewatch	·	2.7 km	MPC · JPL
373345	2012 JV_{52}	—	November 25, 2005	Mount Lemmon	Mount Lemmon Survey	·	1.6 km	MPC · JPL
373346	2012 JN_{64}	—	December 25, 2005	Kitt Peak	Spacewatch	·	2.1 km	MPC · JPL
373347	2012 JH_{65}	—	December 12, 2006	Kitt Peak	Spacewatch	·	1.1 km	MPC · JPL
373348	2012 KP_{1}	—	November 15, 2007	Mount Lemmon	Mount Lemmon Survey	·	790 m	MPC · JPL
373349	2012 KQ_{1}	—	September 3, 2008	Kitt Peak	Spacewatch	·	2.3 km	MPC · JPL
373350	2012 KU_{3}	—	March 24, 2003	Kitt Peak	Spacewatch	·	1.7 km	MPC · JPL
373351	2012 KL_{5}	—	May 6, 2008	Mount Lemmon	Mount Lemmon Survey	·	1.3 km	MPC · JPL
373352	2012 KO_{6}	—	October 14, 2009	Mount Lemmon	Mount Lemmon Survey	·	2.7 km	MPC · JPL
373353	2012 KJ_{7}	—	February 8, 2000	Kitt Peak	Spacewatch	·	3.3 km	MPC · JPL
373354	2012 KD_{15}	—	February 26, 2007	Mount Lemmon	Mount Lemmon Survey	·	1.8 km	MPC · JPL
373355	2012 KE_{16}	—	March 1, 2008	Kitt Peak	Spacewatch	·	1.4 km	MPC · JPL
373356	2012 KS_{17}	—	July 29, 2008	Mount Lemmon	Mount Lemmon Survey	·	2.0 km	MPC · JPL
373357	2012 KG_{26}	—	November 29, 2005	Kitt Peak	Spacewatch	·	1.9 km	MPC · JPL
373358	2012 KG_{27}	—	November 27, 2009	Kitt Peak	Spacewatch	MRX	1.3 km	MPC · JPL
373359	2012 KA_{31}	—	April 29, 2003	Kitt Peak	Spacewatch	·	1.5 km	MPC · JPL
373360	2012 KE_{41}	—	September 5, 1999	Kitt Peak	Spacewatch	·	2.7 km	MPC · JPL
373361	2012 KM_{43}	—	January 10, 2006	Mount Lemmon	Mount Lemmon Survey	·	2.1 km	MPC · JPL
373362	2012 KQ_{44}	—	January 22, 2006	Mount Lemmon	Mount Lemmon Survey	·	2.6 km	MPC · JPL
373363	2012 KW_{46}	—	December 15, 2001	Socorro	LINEAR	·	2.3 km	MPC · JPL
373364	2012 KZ_{47}	—	September 30, 2005	Kitt Peak	Spacewatch	·	1.1 km	MPC · JPL
373365	2012 KD_{48}	—	February 23, 2007	Kitt Peak	Spacewatch	·	1.5 km	MPC · JPL
373366	2012 KD_{49}	—	March 24, 2006	Mount Lemmon	Mount Lemmon Survey	THM	2.4 km	MPC · JPL
373367	2012 LC_{6}	—	September 15, 2007	Mount Lemmon	Mount Lemmon Survey	·	3.1 km	MPC · JPL
373368	2012 LN_{6}	—	October 9, 2008	Catalina	CSS	VER	3.5 km	MPC · JPL
373369	2012 LP_{6}	—	December 11, 2004	Kitt Peak	Spacewatch	·	2.7 km	MPC · JPL
373370	2012 LP_{8}	—	June 4, 1995	Kitt Peak	Spacewatch	VER	3.3 km	MPC · JPL
373371	2012 LO_{15}	—	October 1, 2005	Mount Lemmon	Mount Lemmon Survey	·	1.5 km	MPC · JPL
373372	2012 LK_{17}	—	September 28, 1994	Kitt Peak	Spacewatch	·	1.9 km	MPC · JPL
373373	2012 LB_{18}	—	February 13, 2004	Kitt Peak	Spacewatch	·	1.5 km	MPC · JPL
373374	2012 LD_{19}	—	April 11, 2007	Kitt Peak	Spacewatch	·	1.8 km	MPC · JPL
373375	2012 LR_{19}	—	September 16, 2003	Kitt Peak	Spacewatch	KOR	1.5 km	MPC · JPL
373376	2012 LG_{23}	—	June 23, 2007	Kitt Peak	Spacewatch	·	3.8 km	MPC · JPL
373377	2012 LR_{26}	—	January 25, 2011	Kitt Peak	Spacewatch	·	3.3 km	MPC · JPL
373378	2012 MB_{3}	—	February 27, 2006	Kitt Peak	Spacewatch	CYB	3.7 km	MPC · JPL
373379	2012 MJ_{5}	—	January 7, 2010	Mount Lemmon	Mount Lemmon Survey	·	4.5 km	MPC · JPL
373380	2012 MC_{9}	—	September 26, 2005	Kitt Peak	Spacewatch	·	1.3 km	MPC · JPL
373381	2012 RT_{4}	—	March 30, 2010	WISE	WISE	L5	10 km	MPC · JPL
373382	2012 TK_{30}	—	September 18, 2001	Kitt Peak	Spacewatch	EOS	2.5 km	MPC · JPL
373383	2012 TO_{307}	—	August 28, 2006	Catalina	CSS	·	3.6 km	MPC · JPL
373384	2013 GB_{90}	—	September 28, 2003	Kitt Peak	Spacewatch	V	790 m	MPC · JPL
373385	2013 JX_{36}	—	April 24, 1996	Kitt Peak	Spacewatch	VER	4.7 km	MPC · JPL
373386	2013 MS_{4}	—	February 1, 2006	Mount Lemmon	Mount Lemmon Survey	·	2.8 km	MPC · JPL
373387	2013 MQ_{6}	—	September 18, 2009	Catalina	CSS	EUN	2.0 km	MPC · JPL
373388	2013 NU_{3}	—	September 17, 2006	Kitt Peak	Spacewatch	V	470 m	MPC · JPL
373389	2013 NU_{6}	—	February 2, 2005	Kitt Peak	Spacewatch	PHO	1.5 km	MPC · JPL
373390	2013 NJ_{13}	—	October 5, 2004	Kitt Peak	Spacewatch	·	2.5 km	MPC · JPL
373391	2013 OA_{7}	—	March 8, 2005	Kitt Peak	Spacewatch	·	1.3 km	MPC · JPL
373392	2013 PR	—	June 19, 2007	Kitt Peak	Spacewatch	VER	3.1 km	MPC · JPL
373393	1972 RB	—	September 16, 1972	Palomar	T. Gehrels	AMO	520 m	MPC · JPL
373394	1990 TQ_{9}	—	October 10, 1990	Tautenburg	F. Börngen, L. D. Schmadel	·	1.6 km	MPC · JPL
373395	1993 TF_{6}	—	October 9, 1993	Kitt Peak	Spacewatch	·	2.6 km	MPC · JPL
373396	1994 SH_{10}	—	September 28, 1994	Kitt Peak	Spacewatch	·	2.5 km	MPC · JPL
373397	1995 KJ_{4}	—	May 26, 1995	Kitt Peak	Spacewatch	·	2.7 km	MPC · JPL
373398	1995 SY_{9}	—	September 17, 1995	Kitt Peak	Spacewatch	·	850 m	MPC · JPL
373399	1995 SK_{25}	—	September 19, 1995	Kitt Peak	Spacewatch	·	1.2 km	MPC · JPL
373400	1995 SP_{28}	—	September 20, 1995	Kitt Peak	Spacewatch	·	920 m	MPC · JPL

== 373401–373500 ==
back to top

Designation			Discovery			Properties		Ref
Permanent	Provisional	Named after	Date	Site	Discoverer(s)	Category	Diam.	Ref
373401	1995 SS_{47}	—	September 26, 1995	Kitt Peak	Spacewatch	·	1.9 km	MPC · JPL
373402	1995 TD_{11}	—	October 15, 1995	Kitt Peak	Spacewatch	MRX	950 m	MPC · JPL
373403	1995 UJ_{64}	—	October 26, 1995	Kitt Peak	Spacewatch	CYB	4.7 km	MPC · JPL
373404	1995 VO_{15}	—	November 15, 1995	Kitt Peak	Spacewatch	GEF	1.4 km	MPC · JPL
373405	1995 WO_{21}	—	November 17, 1995	Kitt Peak	Spacewatch	V	680 m	MPC · JPL
373406	1996 RW_{14}	—	September 11, 1996	Kitt Peak	Spacewatch	·	1.7 km	MPC · JPL
373407	1997 AQ_{3}	—	January 3, 1997	Kitt Peak	Spacewatch	ADE	3.4 km	MPC · JPL
373408	1997 EF_{11}	—	March 8, 1997	Kitt Peak	Spacewatch	·	900 m	MPC · JPL
373409	1997 EF_{21}	—	March 4, 1997	Kitt Peak	Spacewatch	·	3.4 km	MPC · JPL
373410	1997 RL_{12}	—	September 6, 1997	Caussols	ODAS	·	1.7 km	MPC · JPL
373411	1997 SX_{14}	—	September 28, 1997	Kitt Peak	Spacewatch	·	3.0 km	MPC · JPL
373412	1997 SD_{26}	—	September 28, 1997	Kitt Peak	Spacewatch	·	2.4 km	MPC · JPL
373413	1997 TU	—	October 3, 1997	Kitt Peak	Spacewatch	·	1.8 km	MPC · JPL
373414	1998 HA_{17}	—	April 18, 1998	Socorro	LINEAR	BAR	1.4 km	MPC · JPL
373415	1998 HB_{27}	—	April 21, 1998	Kitt Peak	Spacewatch	·	1.6 km	MPC · JPL
373416	1998 QG_{1}	—	August 17, 1998	Socorro	LINEAR	·	1.1 km	MPC · JPL
373417	1998 SW_{38}	—	September 23, 1998	Kitt Peak	Spacewatch	KOR	1.4 km	MPC · JPL
373418	1998 TE_{11}	—	October 13, 1998	Kitt Peak	Spacewatch	·	1.2 km	MPC · JPL
373419	1998 TX_{29}	—	October 14, 1998	Xinglong	SCAP	·	1.4 km	MPC · JPL
373420	1998 XL_{8}	—	December 10, 1998	Kitt Peak	Spacewatch	·	2.8 km	MPC · JPL
373421	1998 XF_{17}	—	December 15, 1998	Caussols	ODAS	·	1.4 km	MPC · JPL
373422	1999 CD_{74}	—	February 12, 1999	Socorro	LINEAR	·	1.7 km	MPC · JPL
373423	1999 CR_{128}	—	February 11, 1999	Socorro	LINEAR	·	2.9 km	MPC · JPL
373424	1999 LP_{3}	—	June 9, 1999	Kitt Peak	Spacewatch	JUN	1.2 km	MPC · JPL
373425	1999 MU_{1}	—	June 20, 1999	Anderson Mesa	LONEOS	·	1.0 km	MPC · JPL
373426	1999 RE_{178}	—	September 14, 1999	Kitt Peak	Spacewatch	·	1.7 km	MPC · JPL
373427	1999 RB_{252}	—	September 7, 1999	Catalina	CSS	DOR	3.4 km	MPC · JPL
373428	1999 TC_{5}	—	October 4, 1999	Catalina	CSS	APO	660 m	MPC · JPL
373429	1999 TN_{44}	—	October 3, 1999	Kitt Peak	Spacewatch	AGN	1.2 km	MPC · JPL
373430	1999 TP_{61}	—	October 7, 1999	Kitt Peak	Spacewatch	·	730 m	MPC · JPL
373431	1999 TU_{62}	—	October 7, 1999	Kitt Peak	Spacewatch	AGN	1.3 km	MPC · JPL
373432	1999 TZ_{68}	—	October 9, 1999	Kitt Peak	Spacewatch	·	1 km	MPC · JPL
373433	1999 TF_{84}	—	October 13, 1999	Kitt Peak	Spacewatch	·	1.0 km	MPC · JPL
373434	1999 TC_{111}	—	October 4, 1999	Socorro	LINEAR	·	1 km	MPC · JPL
373435	1999 TF_{125}	—	October 4, 1999	Socorro	LINEAR	·	2.5 km	MPC · JPL
373436	1999 TR_{158}	—	October 8, 1999	Socorro	LINEAR	·	790 m	MPC · JPL
373437	1999 TQ_{170}	—	October 10, 1999	Socorro	LINEAR	·	700 m	MPC · JPL
373438	1999 TK_{176}	—	October 10, 1999	Socorro	LINEAR	·	890 m	MPC · JPL
373439	1999 TF_{226}	—	October 3, 1999	Kitt Peak	Spacewatch	·	1.8 km	MPC · JPL
373440	1999 TJ_{261}	—	October 13, 1999	Kitt Peak	Spacewatch	NYS	810 m	MPC · JPL
373441	1999 TB_{328}	—	October 10, 1999	Socorro	LINEAR	·	810 m	MPC · JPL
373442	1999 TQ_{332}	—	October 13, 1999	Apache Point	SDSS	·	2.2 km	MPC · JPL
373443	1999 UY_{4}	—	October 29, 1999	Kitt Peak	Spacewatch	·	910 m	MPC · JPL
373444	1999 UG_{18}	—	October 30, 1999	Kitt Peak	Spacewatch	AGN	1.4 km	MPC · JPL
373445	1999 UP_{30}	—	October 31, 1999	Kitt Peak	Spacewatch	·	760 m	MPC · JPL
373446	1999 UL_{33}	—	October 31, 1999	Kitt Peak	Spacewatch	(1338) (FLO)	560 m	MPC · JPL
373447	1999 VA_{78}	—	November 4, 1999	Socorro	LINEAR	PHO	1.1 km	MPC · JPL
373448	1999 VG_{122}	—	November 4, 1999	Kitt Peak	Spacewatch	·	790 m	MPC · JPL
373449	1999 VQ_{129}	—	November 11, 1999	Kitt Peak	Spacewatch	NYS	970 m	MPC · JPL
373450	1999 WA_{11}	—	November 30, 1999	Kitt Peak	Spacewatch	·	2.6 km	MPC · JPL
373451	1999 XZ_{216}	—	December 13, 1999	Kitt Peak	Spacewatch	·	960 m	MPC · JPL
373452	2000 AO_{212}	—	January 6, 2000	Kitt Peak	Spacewatch	·	1.0 km	MPC · JPL
373453	2000 DD_{22}	—	February 29, 2000	Socorro	LINEAR	·	1.3 km	MPC · JPL
373454	2000 DP_{113}	—	February 27, 2000	Kitt Peak	Spacewatch	NYS	1.3 km	MPC · JPL
373455	2000 ES_{52}	—	March 3, 2000	Kitt Peak	Spacewatch	MAS	720 m	MPC · JPL
373456	2000 EE_{62}	—	March 10, 2000	Socorro	LINEAR	·	1.8 km	MPC · JPL
373457	2000 FJ_{2}	—	March 25, 2000	Kitt Peak	Spacewatch	·	1.7 km	MPC · JPL
373458	2000 FB_{10}	—	March 30, 2000	Kitt Peak	Spacewatch	·	1.1 km	MPC · JPL
373459	2000 GH_{45}	—	April 5, 2000	Socorro	LINEAR	·	3.5 km	MPC · JPL
373460	2000 GX_{164}	—	April 5, 2000	Socorro	LINEAR	·	1.3 km	MPC · JPL
373461	2000 JE_{87}	—	May 2, 2000	Fort Davis	Farnham, T. L.	·	3.2 km	MPC · JPL
373462	2000 OP_{21}	—	July 7, 2000	Socorro	LINEAR	·	1.7 km	MPC · JPL
373463	2000 PK_{17}	—	August 1, 2000	Socorro	LINEAR	·	680 m	MPC · JPL
373464	2000 QK_{177}	—	August 31, 2000	Socorro	LINEAR	·	3.5 km	MPC · JPL
373465	2000 QJ_{221}	—	July 6, 2000	Anderson Mesa	LONEOS	·	2.1 km	MPC · JPL
373466	2000 RT_{19}	—	September 1, 2000	Socorro	LINEAR	·	1.3 km	MPC · JPL
373467	2000 RJ_{99}	—	September 6, 2000	Socorro	LINEAR	JUN	1.2 km	MPC · JPL
373468	2000 SS_{21}	—	August 31, 2000	Socorro	LINEAR	·	1.9 km	MPC · JPL
373469	2000 SO_{42}	—	September 24, 2000	Socorro	LINEAR	·	1.7 km	MPC · JPL
373470	2000 SF_{51}	—	September 23, 2000	Socorro	LINEAR	EUN	1.3 km	MPC · JPL
373471	2000 SE_{81}	—	September 24, 2000	Socorro	LINEAR	JUN	1.0 km	MPC · JPL
373472	2000 SY_{113}	—	September 24, 2000	Socorro	LINEAR	EUN	1.8 km	MPC · JPL
373473	2000 SR_{137}	—	September 23, 2000	Socorro	LINEAR	·	2.1 km	MPC · JPL
373474	2000 SS_{174}	—	September 28, 2000	Socorro	LINEAR	·	2.0 km	MPC · JPL
373475	2000 SH_{181}	—	September 19, 2000	Haleakala	NEAT	·	1.9 km	MPC · JPL
373476	2000 SO_{189}	—	September 22, 2000	Kitt Peak	Spacewatch	·	1.7 km	MPC · JPL
373477	2000 SG_{228}	—	September 28, 2000	Socorro	LINEAR	·	770 m	MPC · JPL
373478	2000 SF_{235}	—	September 24, 2000	Socorro	LINEAR	·	1.6 km	MPC · JPL
373479	2000 SQ_{291}	—	September 27, 2000	Socorro	LINEAR	·	1.9 km	MPC · JPL
373480	2000 SB_{316}	—	September 30, 2000	Socorro	LINEAR	(194)	1.8 km	MPC · JPL
373481	2000 TP	—	October 2, 2000	Emerald Lane	L. Ball	·	1.8 km	MPC · JPL
373482	2000 TR_{21}	—	October 1, 2000	Socorro	LINEAR	JUN	1.3 km	MPC · JPL
373483	2000 TV_{34}	—	October 6, 2000	Anderson Mesa	LONEOS	·	1.8 km	MPC · JPL
373484	2000 UG_{3}	—	October 24, 2000	Socorro	LINEAR	H	630 m	MPC · JPL
373485	2000 UJ_{6}	—	October 24, 2000	Socorro	LINEAR	(1547)	1.9 km	MPC · JPL
373486	2000 UB_{76}	—	October 25, 2000	Socorro	LINEAR	HNS	2.3 km	MPC · JPL
373487	2000 VB_{3}	—	November 2, 2000	Kitt Peak	Spacewatch	·	1.6 km	MPC · JPL
373488	2000 VZ_{54}	—	November 3, 2000	Socorro	LINEAR	·	2.3 km	MPC · JPL
373489	2000 WA_{12}	—	November 20, 2000	Kitt Peak	Spacewatch	·	630 m	MPC · JPL
373490	2000 WW_{23}	—	November 20, 2000	Socorro	LINEAR	·	2.2 km	MPC · JPL
373491	2000 WQ_{71}	—	November 19, 2000	Socorro	LINEAR	·	1.9 km	MPC · JPL
373492	2000 WU_{81}	—	November 20, 2000	Socorro	LINEAR	·	2.8 km	MPC · JPL
373493	2000 WS_{85}	—	November 20, 2000	Socorro	LINEAR	·	2.7 km	MPC · JPL
373494	2000 WE_{187}	—	November 18, 2000	Anderson Mesa	LONEOS	EUN	1.5 km	MPC · JPL
373495	2000 XO	—	December 1, 2000	Kitt Peak	Spacewatch	EUN	1.3 km	MPC · JPL
373496	2000 XK_{20}	—	December 4, 2000	Socorro	LINEAR	·	1.7 km	MPC · JPL
373497	2000 XD_{49}	—	December 4, 2000	Socorro	LINEAR	·	2.3 km	MPC · JPL
373498	2000 YC_{8}	—	December 21, 2000	Eskridge	G. Hug	·	1.0 km	MPC · JPL
373499	2000 YT_{16}	—	December 20, 2000	Socorro	LINEAR	H	600 m	MPC · JPL
373500	2000 YH_{100}	—	December 28, 2000	Haleakala	NEAT	H	670 m	MPC · JPL

== 373501–373600 ==
back to top

Designation			Discovery			Properties		Ref
Permanent	Provisional	Named after	Date	Site	Discoverer(s)	Category	Diam.	Ref
373501	2001 BD_{10}	—	January 19, 2001	Kitt Peak	Spacewatch	·	2.5 km	MPC · JPL
373502	2001 BE_{63}	—	January 29, 2001	Socorro	LINEAR	·	3.6 km	MPC · JPL
373503	2001 CK_{42}	—	February 15, 2001	Socorro	LINEAR	AMO	320 m	MPC · JPL
373504	2001 EG_{23}	—	March 15, 2001	Haleakala	NEAT	·	1.1 km	MPC · JPL
373505	2001 FC_{11}	—	March 19, 2001	Anderson Mesa	LONEOS	·	900 m	MPC · JPL
373506	2001 FY_{79}	—	March 21, 2001	Socorro	LINEAR	·	1.1 km	MPC · JPL
373507	2001 FX_{119}	—	March 28, 2001	Kitt Peak	Spacewatch	·	820 m	MPC · JPL
373508	2001 KW_{31}	—	May 22, 2001	Socorro	LINEAR	T_{j} (2.96)	3.5 km	MPC · JPL
373509	2001 KB_{44}	—	May 22, 2001	Socorro	LINEAR	·	4.1 km	MPC · JPL
373510	2001 NX_{18}	—	July 13, 2001	Palomar	NEAT	THB	4.9 km	MPC · JPL
373511	2001 OT_{48}	—	July 16, 2001	Haleakala	NEAT	·	5.1 km	MPC · JPL
373512	2001 PN_{48}	—	August 14, 2001	Palomar	NEAT	·	4.5 km	MPC · JPL
373513	2001 RM_{20}	—	September 7, 2001	Socorro	LINEAR	·	710 m	MPC · JPL
373514	2001 RE_{58}	—	September 12, 2001	Socorro	LINEAR	·	990 m	MPC · JPL
373515	2001 RM_{90}	—	September 11, 2001	Anderson Mesa	LONEOS	·	1.5 km	MPC · JPL
373516	2001 RS_{134}	—	September 12, 2001	Socorro	LINEAR	(895)	4.7 km	MPC · JPL
373517	2001 RG_{146}	—	September 8, 2001	Anderson Mesa	LONEOS	·	1.9 km	MPC · JPL
373518	2001 SO_{18}	—	September 16, 2001	Socorro	LINEAR	·	3.4 km	MPC · JPL
373519	2001 SK_{23}	—	September 16, 2001	Socorro	LINEAR	MAR	1.1 km	MPC · JPL
373520	2001 SM_{146}	—	September 16, 2001	Socorro	LINEAR	·	1.1 km	MPC · JPL
373521	2001 SH_{156}	—	September 17, 2001	Socorro	LINEAR	·	4.1 km	MPC · JPL
373522	2001 ST_{158}	—	September 17, 2001	Socorro	LINEAR	·	1.0 km	MPC · JPL
373523	2001 SR_{198}	—	September 19, 2001	Socorro	LINEAR	·	3.0 km	MPC · JPL
373524	2001 SV_{205}	—	September 19, 2001	Socorro	LINEAR	·	950 m	MPC · JPL
373525	2001 SG_{206}	—	September 19, 2001	Socorro	LINEAR	THM	2.7 km	MPC · JPL
373526	2001 SP_{213}	—	September 19, 2001	Socorro	LINEAR	·	780 m	MPC · JPL
373527	2001 SN_{236}	—	September 19, 2001	Socorro	LINEAR	·	3.5 km	MPC · JPL
373528	2001 SS_{243}	—	September 19, 2001	Socorro	LINEAR	·	960 m	MPC · JPL
373529	2001 ST_{268}	—	September 19, 2001	Kitt Peak	Spacewatch	·	4.1 km	MPC · JPL
373530	2001 SS_{275}	—	September 21, 2001	Kitt Peak	Spacewatch	·	820 m	MPC · JPL
373531	2001 SF_{305}	—	September 20, 2001	Socorro	LINEAR	·	1.1 km	MPC · JPL
373532	2001 SA_{348}	—	September 26, 2001	Socorro	LINEAR	·	750 m	MPC · JPL
373533	2001 TF_{11}	—	October 13, 2001	Socorro	LINEAR	NYS	1.6 km	MPC · JPL
373534	2001 TR_{169}	—	October 15, 2001	Socorro	LINEAR	·	2.0 km	MPC · JPL
373535	2001 TX_{174}	—	October 15, 2001	Socorro	LINEAR	·	1.1 km	MPC · JPL
373536	2001 TM_{176}	—	October 14, 2001	Socorro	LINEAR	·	1.7 km	MPC · JPL
373537	2001 TJ_{178}	—	October 14, 2001	Socorro	LINEAR	·	1.1 km	MPC · JPL
373538	2001 TA_{181}	—	October 14, 2001	Socorro	LINEAR	·	1.0 km	MPC · JPL
373539	2001 TV_{195}	—	October 15, 2001	Palomar	NEAT	·	1.5 km	MPC · JPL
373540	2001 TV_{207}	—	October 11, 2001	Palomar	NEAT	·	840 m	MPC · JPL
373541	2001 TL_{209}	—	October 12, 2001	Haleakala	NEAT	·	1.3 km	MPC · JPL
373542	2001 TF_{215}	—	October 13, 2001	Palomar	NEAT	·	1.4 km	MPC · JPL
373543	2001 TH_{250}	—	October 14, 2001	Apache Point	SDSS	L5	10 km	MPC · JPL
373544	2001 UQ_{54}	—	October 18, 2001	Socorro	LINEAR	·	1.6 km	MPC · JPL
373545	2001 UP_{91}	—	October 18, 2001	Palomar	NEAT	·	1.1 km	MPC · JPL
373546	2001 UP_{97}	—	October 17, 2001	Socorro	LINEAR	·	1.3 km	MPC · JPL
373547	2001 US_{113}	—	October 22, 2001	Socorro	LINEAR	·	1.4 km	MPC · JPL
373548	2001 UL_{120}	—	October 22, 2001	Socorro	LINEAR	·	1.2 km	MPC · JPL
373549	2001 US_{143}	—	October 23, 2001	Socorro	LINEAR	(11097) · CYB	3.2 km	MPC · JPL
373550	2001 UX_{161}	—	October 23, 2001	Socorro	LINEAR	·	1.8 km	MPC · JPL
373551	2001 UC_{171}	—	October 21, 2001	Socorro	LINEAR	·	940 m	MPC · JPL
373552	2001 UP_{222}	—	October 21, 2001	Kitt Peak	Spacewatch	·	1.3 km	MPC · JPL
373553	2001 UY_{226}	—	October 24, 2001	Palomar	NEAT	·	3.2 km	MPC · JPL
373554	2001 UF_{227}	—	October 16, 2001	Palomar	NEAT	·	1.1 km	MPC · JPL
373555	2001 VE_{21}	—	November 9, 2001	Socorro	LINEAR	·	1.7 km	MPC · JPL
373556	2001 VX_{30}	—	November 9, 2001	Socorro	LINEAR	·	1.4 km	MPC · JPL
373557	2001 VP_{95}	—	November 15, 2001	Socorro	LINEAR	MAR	1.1 km	MPC · JPL
373558	2001 VE_{124}	—	November 9, 2001	Socorro	LINEAR	·	1.1 km	MPC · JPL
373559	2001 WE_{25}	—	November 17, 2001	Socorro	LINEAR	·	860 m	MPC · JPL
373560	2001 WX_{27}	—	November 17, 2001	Socorro	LINEAR	·	1.3 km	MPC · JPL
373561	2001 WG_{31}	—	November 17, 2001	Socorro	LINEAR	·	1.2 km	MPC · JPL
373562	2001 WS_{87}	—	November 19, 2001	Socorro	LINEAR	(5)	880 m	MPC · JPL
373563	2001 XP_{6}	—	December 8, 2001	Socorro	LINEAR	·	1.6 km	MPC · JPL
373564	2001 XY_{12}	—	December 9, 2001	Socorro	LINEAR	·	1.6 km	MPC · JPL
373565	2001 XM_{32}	—	December 7, 2001	Kitt Peak	Spacewatch	·	1.9 km	MPC · JPL
373566	2001 XG_{57}	—	December 10, 2001	Socorro	LINEAR	·	3.2 km	MPC · JPL
373567	2001 XT_{105}	—	December 10, 2001	Socorro	LINEAR	·	1.5 km	MPC · JPL
373568	2001 XX_{106}	—	November 20, 2001	Socorro	LINEAR	(5)	1.4 km	MPC · JPL
373569	2001 XH_{204}	—	December 11, 2001	Socorro	LINEAR	·	1.4 km	MPC · JPL
373570	2001 XP_{259}	—	December 9, 2001	Anderson Mesa	LONEOS	·	1.0 km	MPC · JPL
373571	2001 YF_{5}	—	December 25, 2001	Ametlla de Mar	J. Nomen	·	1.8 km	MPC · JPL
373572	2001 YA_{7}	—	December 17, 2001	Socorro	LINEAR	·	1.3 km	MPC · JPL
373573	2001 YM_{13}	—	November 21, 2001	Socorro	LINEAR	CYB	4.6 km	MPC · JPL
373574	2001 YH_{51}	—	December 18, 2001	Socorro	LINEAR	·	2.5 km	MPC · JPL
373575	2001 YP_{72}	—	December 18, 2001	Socorro	LINEAR	·	3.2 km	MPC · JPL
373576	2001 YR_{75}	—	December 18, 2001	Socorro	LINEAR	·	1.6 km	MPC · JPL
373577	2001 YB_{85}	—	December 18, 2001	Socorro	LINEAR	·	1.2 km	MPC · JPL
373578	2001 YU_{151}	—	December 19, 2001	Socorro	LINEAR	(5)	1.4 km	MPC · JPL
373579	2002 AW_{11}	—	January 9, 2002	Socorro	LINEAR	APO	530 m	MPC · JPL
373580	2002 AU_{48}	—	January 9, 2002	Socorro	LINEAR	·	2.8 km	MPC · JPL
373581	2002 AV_{50}	—	January 9, 2002	Socorro	LINEAR	(5)	1.2 km	MPC · JPL
373582	2002 AA_{114}	—	January 9, 2002	Socorro	LINEAR	(5)	1.3 km	MPC · JPL
373583	2002 AJ_{137}	—	January 9, 2002	Socorro	LINEAR	·	4.0 km	MPC · JPL
373584	2002 AN_{174}	—	January 14, 2002	Socorro	LINEAR	·	1.4 km	MPC · JPL
373585	2002 AY_{174}	—	January 14, 2002	Socorro	LINEAR	CYB	5.3 km	MPC · JPL
373586	2002 AQ_{185}	—	January 8, 2002	Socorro	LINEAR	·	1.1 km	MPC · JPL
373587	2002 AL_{193}	—	January 12, 2002	Kitt Peak	Spacewatch	(5)	1.4 km	MPC · JPL
373588	2002 CE_{12}	—	February 6, 2002	Socorro	LINEAR	H	540 m	MPC · JPL
373589	2002 CG_{16}	—	February 7, 2002	Kingsnake	J. V. McClusky	·	4.3 km	MPC · JPL
373590	2002 CP_{32}	—	February 6, 2002	Socorro	LINEAR	EUN	1.5 km	MPC · JPL
373591	2002 CU_{57}	—	February 7, 2002	Socorro	LINEAR	·	1.6 km	MPC · JPL
373592	2002 CA_{59}	—	February 13, 2002	Socorro	LINEAR	H	570 m	MPC · JPL
373593	2002 CN_{109}	—	February 7, 2002	Socorro	LINEAR	·	2.2 km	MPC · JPL
373594	2002 CA_{122}	—	February 7, 2002	Socorro	LINEAR	·	1.6 km	MPC · JPL
373595	2002 CL_{123}	—	February 7, 2002	Socorro	LINEAR	·	2.1 km	MPC · JPL
373596	2002 CP_{124}	—	February 7, 2002	Socorro	LINEAR	·	1.7 km	MPC · JPL
373597	2002 CX_{140}	—	February 8, 2002	Socorro	LINEAR	JUN	1.2 km	MPC · JPL
373598	2002 CG_{149}	—	February 10, 2002	Socorro	LINEAR	·	2.3 km	MPC · JPL
373599	2002 CB_{164}	—	February 8, 2002	Socorro	LINEAR	·	1.5 km	MPC · JPL
373600	2002 CA_{217}	—	February 10, 2002	Socorro	LINEAR	·	2.4 km	MPC · JPL

== 373601–373700 ==
back to top

Designation			Discovery			Properties		Ref
Permanent	Provisional	Named after	Date	Site	Discoverer(s)	Category	Diam.	Ref
373601	2002 CU_{227}	—	February 6, 2002	Palomar	NEAT	·	2.3 km	MPC · JPL
373602	2002 CM_{239}	—	February 11, 2002	Socorro	LINEAR	·	1.5 km	MPC · JPL
373603	2002 CR_{241}	—	February 11, 2002	Socorro	LINEAR	·	3.7 km	MPC · JPL
373604	2002 CP_{244}	—	February 11, 2002	Socorro	LINEAR	·	1.6 km	MPC · JPL
373605	2002 CO_{251}	—	February 3, 2002	Palomar	NEAT	·	1.3 km	MPC · JPL
373606	2002 CF_{271}	—	February 8, 2002	Kitt Peak	M. W. Buie	·	2.5 km	MPC · JPL
373607	2002 CZ_{305}	—	February 4, 2002	Anderson Mesa	LONEOS	·	1.7 km	MPC · JPL
373608	2002 CG_{315}	—	February 6, 2002	Palomar	NEAT	(5)	1.4 km	MPC · JPL
373609	2002 CJ_{315}	—	February 7, 2002	Palomar	NEAT	·	1.9 km	MPC · JPL
373610	2002 DE_{7}	—	February 19, 2002	Socorro	LINEAR	·	3.6 km	MPC · JPL
373611	2002 EQ_{2}	—	March 8, 2002	Ondřejov	P. Kušnirák, P. Pravec	·	2.2 km	MPC · JPL
373612	2002 EU_{5}	—	March 11, 2002	Palomar	NEAT	H	600 m	MPC · JPL
373613	2002 ER_{48}	—	March 12, 2002	Palomar	NEAT	·	1.9 km	MPC · JPL
373614	2002 ES_{73}	—	March 13, 2002	Socorro	LINEAR	·	2.7 km	MPC · JPL
373615	2002 EW_{93}	—	March 14, 2002	Socorro	LINEAR	·	1.7 km	MPC · JPL
373616	2002 EU_{110}	—	March 9, 2002	Anderson Mesa	LONEOS	·	1.6 km	MPC · JPL
373617	2002 ER_{114}	—	March 10, 2002	Kitt Peak	Spacewatch	MIS	2.9 km	MPC · JPL
373618	2002 FM	—	March 17, 2002	Haleakala	NEAT	T_{j} (2.93)	2.9 km	MPC · JPL
373619	2002 FA_{1}	—	March 18, 2002	Desert Eagle	W. K. Y. Yeung	·	2.8 km	MPC · JPL
373620	2002 GQ_{4}	—	March 23, 2002	Socorro	LINEAR	H	690 m	MPC · JPL
373621	2002 GQ_{6}	—	April 9, 2002	Socorro	LINEAR	·	950 m	MPC · JPL
373622	2002 GG_{88}	—	April 10, 2002	Socorro	LINEAR	·	4.2 km	MPC · JPL
373623	2002 GQ_{161}	—	April 14, 2002	Anderson Mesa	LONEOS	·	3.3 km	MPC · JPL
373624	2002 GP_{185}	—	April 8, 2002	Palomar	NEAT	·	860 m	MPC · JPL
373625	2002 JV_{82}	—	May 2, 2002	Anderson Mesa	LONEOS	·	740 m	MPC · JPL
373626	2002 JQ_{99}	—	May 13, 2002	Palomar	NEAT	·	2.1 km	MPC · JPL
373627	2002 JG_{147}	—	May 9, 2002	Socorro	LINEAR	·	1.5 km	MPC · JPL
373628	2002 LR_{31}	—	June 6, 2002	Socorro	LINEAR	·	1.1 km	MPC · JPL
373629	2002 LF_{58}	—	June 13, 2002	Kitt Peak	Spacewatch	·	3.0 km	MPC · JPL
373630	2002 ND_{55}	—	July 5, 2002	Palomar	NEAT	·	920 m	MPC · JPL
373631	2002 NH_{58}	—	July 10, 2002	Palomar	NEAT	·	2.4 km	MPC · JPL
373632	2002 NZ_{68}	—	July 14, 2002	Palomar	NEAT	·	860 m	MPC · JPL
373633	2002 NA_{69}	—	July 14, 2002	Palomar	NEAT	EOS	1.9 km	MPC · JPL
373634	2002 NJ_{70}	—	July 3, 2002	Palomar	NEAT	·	920 m	MPC · JPL
373635	2002 OO_{20}	—	July 18, 2002	Socorro	LINEAR	·	770 m	MPC · JPL
373636	2002 OJ_{25}	—	July 23, 2002	Palomar	M. Meyer	·	860 m	MPC · JPL
373637	2002 OY_{28}	—	July 29, 2002	Palomar	NEAT	·	850 m	MPC · JPL
373638	2002 OY_{32}	—	July 29, 2002	Palomar	NEAT	·	2.6 km	MPC · JPL
373639	2002 PB_{2}	—	August 5, 2002	Palomar	NEAT	TIR	2.6 km	MPC · JPL
373640	2002 PF_{6}	—	August 2, 2002	Campo Imperatore	CINEOS	·	2.3 km	MPC · JPL
373641	2002 PJ_{9}	—	August 5, 2002	Palomar	NEAT	·	2.9 km	MPC · JPL
373642	2002 PM_{28}	—	August 6, 2002	Palomar	NEAT	·	840 m	MPC · JPL
373643	2002 PR_{34}	—	August 2, 2002	Campo Imperatore	CINEOS	·	960 m	MPC · JPL
373644	2002 PU_{80}	—	August 11, 2002	Palomar	NEAT	MAS	680 m	MPC · JPL
373645	2002 PS_{100}	—	August 11, 2002	Palomar	NEAT	·	2.9 km	MPC · JPL
373646	2002 PT_{101}	—	August 12, 2002	Socorro	LINEAR	EOS	2.4 km	MPC · JPL
373647	2002 PG_{147}	—	August 9, 2002	Cerro Tololo	M. W. Buie	·	760 m	MPC · JPL
373648	2002 PK_{165}	—	August 8, 2002	Palomar	Lowe, A.	·	3.5 km	MPC · JPL
373649	2002 PA_{172}	—	August 8, 2002	Palomar	NEAT	·	2.2 km	MPC · JPL
373650	2002 PB_{172}	—	August 8, 2002	Palomar	NEAT	·	2.3 km	MPC · JPL
373651	2002 PZ_{176}	—	August 15, 2002	Palomar	NEAT	V	610 m	MPC · JPL
373652	2002 PR_{180}	—	August 7, 2002	Palomar	NEAT	·	850 m	MPC · JPL
373653	2002 QD_{6}	—	August 17, 2002	Socorro	LINEAR	·	4.4 km	MPC · JPL
373654	2002 QW_{12}	—	August 26, 2002	Palomar	NEAT	·	1.9 km	MPC · JPL
373655	2002 QV_{27}	—	August 28, 2002	Palomar	NEAT	·	890 m	MPC · JPL
373656	2002 QV_{56}	—	August 29, 2002	Palomar	S. F. Hönig	·	2.0 km	MPC · JPL
373657	2002 QO_{62}	—	August 28, 2002	Palomar	NEAT	H	480 m	MPC · JPL
373658	2002 QW_{66}	—	August 18, 2002	Palomar	NEAT	NYS	840 m	MPC · JPL
373659	2002 QU_{67}	—	August 17, 2002	Palomar	NEAT	·	840 m	MPC · JPL
373660	2002 QU_{69}	—	August 27, 2002	Palomar	NEAT	·	2.2 km	MPC · JPL
373661	2002 QA_{70}	—	August 19, 2002	Palomar	NEAT	TIR	2.8 km	MPC · JPL
373662	2002 QW_{73}	—	August 18, 2002	Palomar	NEAT	·	2.6 km	MPC · JPL
373663	2002 QF_{80}	—	August 17, 2002	Palomar	NEAT	·	2.3 km	MPC · JPL
373664	2002 QJ_{81}	—	August 16, 2002	Palomar	NEAT	EOS	2.0 km	MPC · JPL
373665	2002 QP_{81}	—	August 19, 2002	Palomar	NEAT	·	2.3 km	MPC · JPL
373666	2002 QY_{82}	—	August 16, 2002	Palomar	NEAT	·	1.7 km	MPC · JPL
373667	2002 QX_{88}	—	August 27, 2002	Palomar	NEAT	·	1.9 km	MPC · JPL
373668	2002 QS_{89}	—	August 27, 2002	Palomar	NEAT	MAS	560 m	MPC · JPL
373669	2002 QL_{92}	—	August 29, 2002	Palomar	NEAT	·	2.6 km	MPC · JPL
373670	2002 QC_{96}	—	August 19, 2002	Palomar	NEAT	EOS	2.0 km	MPC · JPL
373671	2002 QB_{103}	—	August 30, 2002	Palomar	NEAT	·	1.9 km	MPC · JPL
373672	2002 QE_{106}	—	August 19, 2002	Palomar	NEAT	EOS	2.3 km	MPC · JPL
373673	2002 QM_{114}	—	August 28, 2002	Palomar	NEAT	·	2.9 km	MPC · JPL
373674	2002 QE_{115}	—	August 18, 2002	Palomar	NEAT	·	2.1 km	MPC · JPL
373675	2002 QY_{117}	—	August 18, 2002	Palomar	NEAT	·	3.9 km	MPC · JPL
373676	2002 QE_{122}	—	August 16, 2002	Palomar	NEAT	·	2.7 km	MPC · JPL
373677	2002 QC_{125}	—	August 29, 2002	Palomar	NEAT	·	950 m	MPC · JPL
373678	2002 QG_{127}	—	August 29, 2002	Palomar	NEAT	·	1.2 km	MPC · JPL
373679	2002 QQ_{135}	—	August 30, 2002	Palomar	NEAT	·	2.4 km	MPC · JPL
373680	2002 QA_{151}	—	October 10, 1997	Kitt Peak	Spacewatch	·	1.9 km	MPC · JPL
373681	2002 RJ_{4}	—	September 3, 2002	Palomar	NEAT	·	3.0 km	MPC · JPL
373682	2002 RT_{5}	—	September 3, 2002	Palomar	NEAT	·	2.6 km	MPC · JPL
373683	2002 RH_{9}	—	September 4, 2002	Palomar	NEAT	·	2.6 km	MPC · JPL
373684	2002 RG_{12}	—	September 4, 2002	Anderson Mesa	LONEOS	·	4.9 km	MPC · JPL
373685	2002 RB_{20}	—	September 4, 2002	Anderson Mesa	LONEOS	·	1.6 km	MPC · JPL
373686	2002 RT_{31}	—	September 4, 2002	Anderson Mesa	LONEOS	·	3.6 km	MPC · JPL
373687	2002 RB_{45}	—	September 5, 2002	Socorro	LINEAR	NYS	1.0 km	MPC · JPL
373688	2002 RL_{68}	—	September 4, 2002	Anderson Mesa	LONEOS	·	3.3 km	MPC · JPL
373689	2002 RN_{76}	—	September 5, 2002	Socorro	LINEAR	NYS	1.4 km	MPC · JPL
373690	2002 RL_{78}	—	September 5, 2002	Socorro	LINEAR	·	3.2 km	MPC · JPL
373691	2002 RT_{80}	—	September 5, 2002	Socorro	LINEAR	·	2.7 km	MPC · JPL
373692	2002 RM_{89}	—	September 5, 2002	Socorro	LINEAR	NYS	1.0 km	MPC · JPL
373693	2002 RL_{114}	—	September 5, 2002	Socorro	LINEAR	·	5.5 km	MPC · JPL
373694	2002 RC_{115}	—	September 6, 2002	Socorro	LINEAR	·	1.1 km	MPC · JPL
373695	2002 RJ_{117}	—	September 8, 2002	Ondřejov	P. Pravec, P. Kušnirák	·	1.3 km	MPC · JPL
373696	2002 RE_{141}	—	September 10, 2002	Palomar	NEAT	·	1.6 km	MPC · JPL
373697	2002 RH_{143}	—	September 11, 2002	Palomar	NEAT	·	2.5 km	MPC · JPL
373698	2002 RY_{150}	—	September 12, 2002	Palomar	NEAT	·	2.6 km	MPC · JPL
373699	2002 RL_{158}	—	September 11, 2002	Palomar	NEAT	NYS	940 m	MPC · JPL
373700	2002 RG_{171}	—	September 13, 2002	Socorro	LINEAR	NYS	1.2 km	MPC · JPL

== 373701–373800 ==
back to top

Designation			Discovery			Properties		Ref
Permanent	Provisional	Named after	Date	Site	Discoverer(s)	Category	Diam.	Ref
373701	2002 RK_{175}	—	September 13, 2002	Palomar	NEAT	·	3.4 km	MPC · JPL
373702	2002 RX_{197}	—	September 13, 2002	Palomar	NEAT	MAS	660 m	MPC · JPL
373703	2002 RS_{204}	—	September 14, 2002	Palomar	NEAT	·	2.2 km	MPC · JPL
373704	2002 RD_{237}	—	September 15, 2002	Palomar	R. Matson	·	2.6 km	MPC · JPL
373705	2002 RK_{237}	—	September 15, 2002	Palomar	R. Matson	EOS	2.5 km	MPC · JPL
373706	2002 RY_{241}	—	September 14, 2002	Palomar	R. Matson	·	1.8 km	MPC · JPL
373707	2002 RK_{247}	—	September 15, 2002	Palomar	NEAT	·	950 m	MPC · JPL
373708	2002 RB_{249}	—	September 14, 2002	Palomar	NEAT	·	2.4 km	MPC · JPL
373709	2002 RZ_{252}	—	September 14, 2002	Palomar	NEAT	·	830 m	MPC · JPL
373710	2002 RC_{256}	—	September 4, 2002	Palomar	NEAT	EOS	1.7 km	MPC · JPL
373711	2002 RL_{258}	—	September 14, 2002	Palomar	NEAT	EOS	2.1 km	MPC · JPL
373712	2002 RR_{259}	—	September 15, 2002	Palomar	NEAT	ANF	1.7 km	MPC · JPL
373713	2002 RJ_{260}	—	September 12, 2002	Palomar	NEAT	·	2.2 km	MPC · JPL
373714	2002 RA_{261}	—	September 10, 2002	Palomar	NEAT	·	1.2 km	MPC · JPL
373715	2002 RH_{267}	—	September 14, 2002	Palomar	NEAT	EOS	4.4 km	MPC · JPL
373716	2002 RE_{269}	—	September 4, 2002	Palomar	NEAT	EOS	1.9 km	MPC · JPL
373717	2002 RF_{273}	—	September 14, 2002	Palomar	NEAT	EOS	2.0 km	MPC · JPL
373718	2002 RS_{276}	—	September 14, 2002	Palomar	NEAT	·	2.2 km	MPC · JPL
373719	2002 RX_{277}	—	September 4, 2002	Palomar	NEAT	·	2.4 km	MPC · JPL
373720	2002 RG_{278}	—	September 1, 2002	Haleakala	NEAT	·	2.8 km	MPC · JPL
373721	2002 RV_{282}	—	September 14, 2002	Palomar	NEAT	NYS	1.1 km	MPC · JPL
373722	2002 SR_{5}	—	September 27, 2002	Palomar	NEAT	·	2.3 km	MPC · JPL
373723	2002 SV_{12}	—	September 27, 2002	Palomar	NEAT	·	3.0 km	MPC · JPL
373724	2002 SW_{16}	—	September 27, 2002	Palomar	NEAT	·	1.6 km	MPC · JPL
373725	2002 SZ_{22}	—	September 26, 2002	Haleakala	NEAT	·	3.7 km	MPC · JPL
373726	2002 SO_{24}	—	September 28, 2002	Palomar	NEAT	·	1.1 km	MPC · JPL
373727	2002 SX_{29}	—	September 28, 2002	Haleakala	NEAT	NYS	1.0 km	MPC · JPL
373728	2002 SF_{43}	—	September 28, 2002	Haleakala	NEAT	NYS	1.2 km	MPC · JPL
373729	2002 SM_{49}	—	September 30, 2002	Socorro	LINEAR	·	1.1 km	MPC · JPL
373730	2002 SL_{64}	—	September 16, 2002	Palomar	NEAT	·	1.1 km	MPC · JPL
373731	2002 SA_{69}	—	September 26, 2002	Palomar	NEAT	·	1.2 km	MPC · JPL
373732	2002 TC_{12}	—	October 1, 2002	Anderson Mesa	LONEOS	·	3.5 km	MPC · JPL
373733	2002 TS_{14}	—	September 27, 2002	Palomar	NEAT	NYS	1.2 km	MPC · JPL
373734	2002 TH_{19}	—	October 2, 2002	Socorro	LINEAR	·	3.8 km	MPC · JPL
373735	2002 TB_{25}	—	October 2, 2002	Socorro	LINEAR	·	1.0 km	MPC · JPL
373736	2002 TQ_{27}	—	October 2, 2002	Socorro	LINEAR	·	1.5 km	MPC · JPL
373737	2002 TF_{33}	—	October 2, 2002	Socorro	LINEAR	·	1.1 km	MPC · JPL
373738	2002 TA_{35}	—	October 2, 2002	Socorro	LINEAR	·	4.4 km	MPC · JPL
373739	2002 TE_{52}	—	September 8, 2002	Campo Imperatore	CINEOS	·	1.6 km	MPC · JPL
373740	2002 TY_{60}	—	October 3, 2002	Socorro	LINEAR	NYS	1.3 km	MPC · JPL
373741	2002 TK_{67}	—	October 4, 2002	Palomar	NEAT	·	3.9 km	MPC · JPL
373742	2002 TE_{72}	—	October 3, 2002	Palomar	NEAT	EUP	6.8 km	MPC · JPL
373743	2002 TH_{73}	—	October 3, 2002	Palomar	NEAT	·	3.1 km	MPC · JPL
373744	2002 TO_{74}	—	October 1, 2002	Anderson Mesa	LONEOS	·	3.1 km	MPC · JPL
373745	2002 TL_{84}	—	October 2, 2002	Haleakala	NEAT	HYG	3.7 km	MPC · JPL
373746	2002 TS_{85}	—	October 2, 2002	Campo Imperatore	CINEOS	·	3.3 km	MPC · JPL
373747	2002 TF_{94}	—	October 3, 2002	Socorro	LINEAR	THM	2.7 km	MPC · JPL
373748	2002 TM_{130}	—	October 4, 2002	Socorro	LINEAR	·	1.1 km	MPC · JPL
373749	2002 TN_{138}	—	October 4, 2002	Anderson Mesa	LONEOS	·	1.4 km	MPC · JPL
373750	2002 TW_{142}	—	October 4, 2002	Socorro	LINEAR	·	1.3 km	MPC · JPL
373751	2002 TF_{143}	—	October 4, 2002	Socorro	LINEAR	·	3.1 km	MPC · JPL
373752	2002 TW_{144}	—	October 2, 2002	Socorro	LINEAR	·	1.2 km	MPC · JPL
373753	2002 TK_{155}	—	October 5, 2002	Socorro	LINEAR	·	1.2 km	MPC · JPL
373754	2002 TU_{164}	—	October 5, 2002	Palomar	NEAT	TIR	3.9 km	MPC · JPL
373755	2002 TY_{165}	—	October 3, 2002	Palomar	NEAT	·	1.3 km	MPC · JPL
373756	2002 TF_{169}	—	October 3, 2002	Palomar	NEAT	·	3.5 km	MPC · JPL
373757	2002 TM_{169}	—	October 3, 2002	Palomar	NEAT	·	5.5 km	MPC · JPL
373758	2002 TF_{187}	—	October 4, 2002	Socorro	LINEAR	·	1.0 km	MPC · JPL
373759	2002 TS_{200}	—	October 4, 2002	Socorro	LINEAR	PHO	1.0 km	MPC · JPL
373760	2002 TZ_{202}	—	October 4, 2002	Socorro	LINEAR	·	4.2 km	MPC · JPL
373761	2002 TQ_{204}	—	October 4, 2002	Socorro	LINEAR	·	3.9 km	MPC · JPL
373762	2002 TE_{211}	—	October 7, 2002	Socorro	LINEAR	·	4.7 km	MPC · JPL
373763	2002 TO_{221}	—	October 6, 2002	Socorro	LINEAR	·	3.8 km	MPC · JPL
373764	2002 TF_{239}	—	October 8, 2002	Anderson Mesa	LONEOS	·	3.8 km	MPC · JPL
373765	2002 TW_{246}	—	October 9, 2002	Kitt Peak	Spacewatch	MAS	730 m	MPC · JPL
373766	2002 TA_{247}	—	October 9, 2002	Kitt Peak	Spacewatch	·	4.7 km	MPC · JPL
373767	2002 TS_{247}	—	October 9, 2002	Socorro	LINEAR	·	3.2 km	MPC · JPL
373768	2002 TT_{255}	—	October 9, 2002	Palomar	NEAT	·	3.9 km	MPC · JPL
373769	2002 TE_{268}	—	October 4, 2002	Socorro	LINEAR	·	1.3 km	MPC · JPL
373770	2002 TM_{273}	—	October 4, 2002	Socorro	LINEAR	·	1.3 km	MPC · JPL
373771	2002 TM_{282}	—	October 10, 2002	Socorro	LINEAR	·	4.3 km	MPC · JPL
373772	2002 TJ_{290}	—	October 10, 2002	Socorro	LINEAR	·	1.5 km	MPC · JPL
373773	2002 TR_{303}	—	October 4, 2002	Apache Point	SDSS	NYS	880 m	MPC · JPL
373774	2002 TL_{305}	—	October 4, 2002	Apache Point	SDSS	·	3.9 km	MPC · JPL
373775	2002 TJ_{307}	—	October 4, 2002	Apache Point	SDSS	·	1.2 km	MPC · JPL
373776	2002 TF_{320}	—	October 5, 2002	Apache Point	SDSS	·	3.5 km	MPC · JPL
373777	2002 TQ_{321}	—	October 5, 2002	Apache Point	SDSS	THM	2.1 km	MPC · JPL
373778	2002 TS_{331}	—	October 5, 2002	Apache Point	SDSS	MAS	660 m	MPC · JPL
373779	2002 TH_{336}	—	October 5, 2002	Apache Point	SDSS	·	3.4 km	MPC · JPL
373780	2002 TK_{341}	—	October 5, 2002	Apache Point	SDSS	HYG ·	2.6 km	MPC · JPL
373781	2002 TG_{344}	—	October 5, 2002	Apache Point	SDSS	·	3.9 km	MPC · JPL
373782	2002 TS_{346}	—	October 5, 2002	Apache Point	SDSS	·	3.7 km	MPC · JPL
373783	2002 TG_{350}	—	October 10, 2002	Apache Point	SDSS	EOS	2.4 km	MPC · JPL
373784	2002 TM_{355}	—	October 10, 2002	Apache Point	SDSS	·	960 m	MPC · JPL
373785	2002 TL_{356}	—	October 10, 2002	Apache Point	SDSS	·	790 m	MPC · JPL
373786	2002 UU_{4}	—	October 29, 2002	Socorro	LINEAR	·	4.8 km	MPC · JPL
373787	2002 UJ_{5}	—	October 28, 2002	Palomar	NEAT	·	3.8 km	MPC · JPL
373788	2002 UL_{20}	—	October 28, 2002	Haleakala	NEAT	·	5.1 km	MPC · JPL
373789	2002 UU_{32}	—	November 1, 2002	Palomar	NEAT	ERI	1.6 km	MPC · JPL
373790	2002 UQ_{41}	—	October 31, 2002	Palomar	NEAT	NYS	1.4 km	MPC · JPL
373791	2002 UJ_{61}	—	October 30, 2002	Apache Point	SDSS	EOS	2.3 km	MPC · JPL
373792	2002 UN_{61}	—	October 30, 2002	Apache Point	SDSS	·	2.1 km	MPC · JPL
373793	2002 UB_{72}	—	October 18, 2002	Palomar	NEAT	·	4.1 km	MPC · JPL
373794	2002 UP_{72}	—	October 16, 2002	Palomar	NEAT	·	3.6 km	MPC · JPL
373795	2002 UY_{74}	—	October 31, 2002	Palomar	NEAT	·	3.8 km	MPC · JPL
373796	2002 UP_{75}	—	October 31, 2002	Palomar	NEAT	THM	2.4 km	MPC · JPL
373797	2002 VQ_{2}	—	November 1, 2002	Palomar	NEAT	TIR	3.9 km	MPC · JPL
373798	2002 VG_{17}	—	November 5, 2002	Socorro	LINEAR	·	1.3 km	MPC · JPL
373799	2002 VL_{29}	—	November 5, 2002	Socorro	LINEAR	·	1.5 km	MPC · JPL
373800	2002 VU_{32}	—	November 5, 2002	Socorro	LINEAR	NYS	1.5 km	MPC · JPL

== 373801–373900 ==
back to top

Designation			Discovery			Properties		Ref
Permanent	Provisional	Named after	Date	Site	Discoverer(s)	Category	Diam.	Ref
373801	2002 VA_{36}	—	November 5, 2002	Kitt Peak	Spacewatch	MAS	860 m	MPC · JPL
373802	2002 VP_{41}	—	November 5, 2002	Palomar	NEAT	EOS	2.8 km	MPC · JPL
373803	2002 VE_{45}	—	November 5, 2002	Fountain Hills	Hills, Fountain	·	5.9 km	MPC · JPL
373804	2002 VY_{67}	—	November 6, 2002	Kitt Peak	Spacewatch	HYG	3.2 km	MPC · JPL
373805	2002 VG_{75}	—	November 7, 2002	Socorro	LINEAR	THM	3.1 km	MPC · JPL
373806	2002 VW_{92}	—	November 11, 2002	Socorro	LINEAR	·	3.9 km	MPC · JPL
373807	2002 VW_{113}	—	November 5, 2002	Socorro	LINEAR	·	4.2 km	MPC · JPL
373808	2002 VW_{114}	—	November 11, 2002	Anderson Mesa	LONEOS	LIX	3.8 km	MPC · JPL
373809	2002 VZ_{114}	—	November 11, 2002	Anderson Mesa	LONEOS	TIR	3.3 km	MPC · JPL
373810	2002 VV_{125}	—	November 14, 2002	Nogales	Tenagra II	·	3.1 km	MPC · JPL
373811	2002 VY_{129}	—	November 9, 2002	Kitt Peak	M. W. Buie	·	2.6 km	MPC · JPL
373812	2002 VC_{134}	—	November 6, 2002	Socorro	LINEAR	THM	2.8 km	MPC · JPL
373813	2002 VP_{139}	—	November 5, 2002	Palomar	NEAT	L5	10 km	MPC · JPL
373814	2002 VU_{141}	—	November 15, 2002	Palomar	NEAT	·	3.8 km	MPC · JPL
373815	2002 VW_{142}	—	November 5, 2002	Palomar	NEAT	·	2.8 km	MPC · JPL
373816	2002 WA_{23}	—	November 23, 2002	Palomar	NEAT	·	1.5 km	MPC · JPL
373817	2002 WL_{24}	—	November 16, 2002	Palomar	NEAT	THM	2.3 km	MPC · JPL
373818	2002 WV_{26}	—	November 22, 2002	Palomar	NEAT	·	3.2 km	MPC · JPL
373819	2002 WH_{27}	—	November 23, 2002	Palomar	NEAT	·	3.3 km	MPC · JPL
373820	2002 WG_{29}	—	November 22, 2002	Palomar	NEAT	L5	10 km	MPC · JPL
373821	2002 XG_{8}	—	December 2, 2002	Socorro	LINEAR	MAS	810 m	MPC · JPL
373822	2002 XH_{8}	—	December 2, 2002	Socorro	LINEAR	MAS	820 m	MPC · JPL
373823	2002 XJ_{10}	—	December 2, 2002	Haleakala	NEAT	MAS	890 m	MPC · JPL
373824	2002 XJ_{11}	—	December 3, 2002	Palomar	NEAT	·	1.6 km	MPC · JPL
373825	2002 XD_{12}	—	December 3, 2002	Palomar	NEAT	·	1.1 km	MPC · JPL
373826	2002 XP_{15}	—	December 3, 2002	Palomar	NEAT	·	3.8 km	MPC · JPL
373827	2002 XD_{20}	—	December 2, 2002	Socorro	LINEAR	·	3.4 km	MPC · JPL
373828	2002 XH_{39}	—	December 9, 2002	Kitt Peak	Spacewatch	·	1.3 km	MPC · JPL
373829	2002 XN_{50}	—	December 10, 2002	Socorro	LINEAR	NYS	1.2 km	MPC · JPL
373830	2002 XC_{58}	—	December 11, 2002	Socorro	LINEAR	·	2.7 km	MPC · JPL
373831	2002 XQ_{72}	—	December 11, 2002	Socorro	LINEAR	·	1.5 km	MPC · JPL
373832	2002 XO_{87}	—	December 12, 2002	Palomar	NEAT	·	4.3 km	MPC · JPL
373833	2002 XY_{92}	—	December 5, 2002	Socorro	LINEAR	·	3.2 km	MPC · JPL
373834	2002 XD_{113}	—	December 6, 2002	Socorro	LINEAR	·	1.0 km	MPC · JPL
373835	2002 YX_{15}	—	December 31, 2002	Anderson Mesa	LONEOS	·	4.7 km	MPC · JPL
373836	2002 YG_{17}	—	December 31, 2002	Socorro	LINEAR	·	2.6 km	MPC · JPL
373837	2003 AA_{65}	—	January 7, 2003	Socorro	LINEAR	PHO	1.1 km	MPC · JPL
373838	2003 BG_{30}	—	January 27, 2003	Socorro	LINEAR	EUN	1.3 km	MPC · JPL
373839	2003 BO_{45}	—	January 29, 2003	Palomar	NEAT	·	1.2 km	MPC · JPL
373840	2003 EA_{26}	—	March 6, 2003	Anderson Mesa	LONEOS	·	1.7 km	MPC · JPL
373841	2003 ED_{43}	—	March 10, 2003	Kitt Peak	Spacewatch	MAR	1.2 km	MPC · JPL
373842	2003 FT	—	March 21, 2003	Costitx	OAM	·	1.9 km	MPC · JPL
373843	2003 FE_{67}	—	March 26, 2003	Palomar	NEAT	·	2.1 km	MPC · JPL
373844	2003 FE_{79}	—	March 27, 2003	Kitt Peak	Spacewatch	·	2.5 km	MPC · JPL
373845	2003 FO_{82}	—	March 27, 2003	Palomar	NEAT	ADE	2.6 km	MPC · JPL
373846	2003 GN_{5}	—	April 1, 2003	Socorro	LINEAR	MAR	1.6 km	MPC · JPL
373847	2003 GM_{12}	—	February 27, 2003	Campo Imperatore	CINEOS	·	2.0 km	MPC · JPL
373848	2003 GU_{25}	—	April 4, 2003	Kitt Peak	Spacewatch	·	2.3 km	MPC · JPL
373849	2003 GD_{39}	—	April 9, 2003	Kitt Peak	Spacewatch	·	1.4 km	MPC · JPL
373850	2003 HK_{43}	—	April 29, 2003	Socorro	LINEAR	·	1.5 km	MPC · JPL
373851	2003 HW_{43}	—	April 11, 2003	Kitt Peak	Spacewatch	·	3.2 km	MPC · JPL
373852	2003 JD_{5}	—	May 1, 2003	Socorro	LINEAR	EUN	1.6 km	MPC · JPL
373853	2003 OP_{23}	—	July 22, 2003	Campo Imperatore	CINEOS	·	650 m	MPC · JPL
373854	2003 OO_{33}	—	July 28, 2003	Palomar	NEAT	·	1.8 km	MPC · JPL
373855	2003 QY_{6}	—	August 20, 2003	Campo Imperatore	CINEOS	·	760 m	MPC · JPL
373856	2003 QV_{10}	—	August 23, 2003	Socorro	LINEAR	H	450 m	MPC · JPL
373857	2003 QB_{19}	—	August 22, 2003	Socorro	LINEAR	·	690 m	MPC · JPL
373858	2003 QV_{35}	—	August 22, 2003	Palomar	NEAT	·	730 m	MPC · JPL
373859	2003 QW_{83}	—	August 4, 2003	Kitt Peak	Spacewatch	KOR	1.2 km	MPC · JPL
373860	2003 QQ_{101}	—	August 29, 2003	Haleakala	NEAT	·	980 m	MPC · JPL
373861	2003 RO_{2}	—	September 1, 2003	Socorro	LINEAR	BRA	1.8 km	MPC · JPL
373862	2003 RK_{4}	—	September 2, 2003	Socorro	LINEAR	·	3.9 km	MPC · JPL
373863	2003 SA_{2}	—	September 16, 2003	Kitt Peak	Spacewatch	KOR	1.3 km	MPC · JPL
373864	2003 SO_{7}	—	September 16, 2003	Kitt Peak	Spacewatch	·	2.1 km	MPC · JPL
373865	2003 SP_{9}	—	September 17, 2003	Kitt Peak	Spacewatch	·	3.3 km	MPC · JPL
373866	2003 SX_{23}	—	September 17, 2003	Kitt Peak	Spacewatch	·	680 m	MPC · JPL
373867	2003 SG_{33}	—	September 18, 2003	Piszkéstető	K. Sárneczky, B. Sipőcz	·	2.0 km	MPC · JPL
373868	2003 SY_{40}	—	September 17, 2003	Palomar	NEAT	·	2.2 km	MPC · JPL
373869	2003 SF_{49}	—	September 18, 2003	Palomar	NEAT	·	830 m	MPC · JPL
373870	2003 SW_{51}	—	September 18, 2003	Palomar	NEAT	·	670 m	MPC · JPL
373871	2003 ST_{53}	—	September 16, 2003	Kitt Peak	Spacewatch	·	1.9 km	MPC · JPL
373872	2003 SN_{63}	—	September 17, 2003	Kitt Peak	Spacewatch	·	2.7 km	MPC · JPL
373873	2003 SO_{65}	—	September 18, 2003	Anderson Mesa	LONEOS	·	800 m	MPC · JPL
373874	2003 SL_{87}	—	September 17, 2003	Socorro	LINEAR	·	2.4 km	MPC · JPL
373875	2003 SP_{117}	—	September 16, 2003	Kitt Peak	Spacewatch	·	760 m	MPC · JPL
373876	2003 SH_{124}	—	September 18, 2003	Palomar	NEAT	·	2.1 km	MPC · JPL
373877	2003 SQ_{139}	—	August 26, 2003	Socorro	LINEAR	·	1.0 km	MPC · JPL
373878	2003 SO_{158}	—	September 23, 2003	Haleakala	NEAT	·	700 m	MPC · JPL
373879	2003 SM_{174}	—	September 18, 2003	Kitt Peak	Spacewatch	EOS	1.9 km	MPC · JPL
373880	2003 SD_{214}	—	September 26, 2003	Desert Eagle	W. K. Y. Yeung	·	2.5 km	MPC · JPL
373881	2003 SU_{222}	—	September 27, 2003	Socorro	LINEAR	·	780 m	MPC · JPL
373882	2003 SG_{227}	—	September 27, 2003	Kitt Peak	Spacewatch	·	710 m	MPC · JPL
373883	2003 SB_{234}	—	September 25, 2003	Palomar	NEAT	·	780 m	MPC · JPL
373884	2003 SB_{247}	—	September 26, 2003	Socorro	LINEAR	·	680 m	MPC · JPL
373885	2003 SA_{275}	—	September 28, 2003	Anderson Mesa	LONEOS	EOS	1.9 km	MPC · JPL
373886	2003 SM_{301}	—	September 17, 2003	Palomar	NEAT	KOR	1.8 km	MPC · JPL
373887	2003 SS_{306}	—	September 30, 2003	Socorro	LINEAR	EOS	2.8 km	MPC · JPL
373888	2003 SA_{319}	—	September 20, 2003	Kitt Peak	Spacewatch	·	2.3 km	MPC · JPL
373889	2003 SC_{323}	—	September 16, 2003	Kitt Peak	Spacewatch	·	2.2 km	MPC · JPL
373890	2003 SQ_{326}	—	September 18, 2003	Kitt Peak	Spacewatch	·	1.8 km	MPC · JPL
373891	2003 SU_{328}	—	September 21, 2003	Kitt Peak	Spacewatch	KOR	1.3 km	MPC · JPL
373892	2003 SJ_{329}	—	September 22, 2003	Palomar	NEAT	·	620 m	MPC · JPL
373893	2003 SG_{333}	—	September 17, 2003	Kitt Peak	Spacewatch	·	2.1 km	MPC · JPL
373894	2003 SN_{334}	—	September 26, 2003	Apache Point	SDSS	·	1.9 km	MPC · JPL
373895	2003 SM_{335}	—	September 26, 2003	Apache Point	SDSS	·	640 m	MPC · JPL
373896	2003 SO_{338}	—	September 26, 2003	Apache Point	SDSS	KOR	1.6 km	MPC · JPL
373897	2003 TK_{14}	—	October 15, 2003	Anderson Mesa	LONEOS	H	410 m	MPC · JPL
373898	2003 TO_{31}	—	October 1, 2003	Kitt Peak	Spacewatch	·	1.9 km	MPC · JPL
373899	2003 TS_{42}	—	October 2, 2003	Kitt Peak	Spacewatch	·	790 m	MPC · JPL
373900	2003 TB_{55}	—	October 5, 2003	Kitt Peak	Spacewatch	·	690 m	MPC · JPL

== 373901–374000 ==
back to top

Designation			Discovery			Properties		Ref
Permanent	Provisional	Named after	Date	Site	Discoverer(s)	Category	Diam.	Ref
373901	2003 UP_{13}	—	October 19, 2003	Palomar	NEAT	H	470 m	MPC · JPL
373902	2003 UE_{19}	—	October 20, 2003	Palomar	NEAT	·	3.5 km	MPC · JPL
373903	2003 UR_{23}	—	October 22, 2003	Kitt Peak	Spacewatch	·	870 m	MPC · JPL
373904	2003 UO_{29}	—	October 24, 2003	Haleakala	NEAT	·	900 m	MPC · JPL
373905	2003 UC_{31}	—	October 16, 2003	Kitt Peak	Spacewatch	KOR	1.3 km	MPC · JPL
373906	2003 UK_{36}	—	October 16, 2003	Palomar	NEAT	·	900 m	MPC · JPL
373907	2003 UE_{63}	—	September 28, 2003	Anderson Mesa	LONEOS	·	710 m	MPC · JPL
373908	2003 UG_{75}	—	October 17, 2003	Anderson Mesa	LONEOS	·	760 m	MPC · JPL
373909	2003 UA_{77}	—	October 17, 2003	Kitt Peak	Spacewatch	·	750 m	MPC · JPL
373910	2003 UV_{92}	—	October 20, 2003	Palomar	NEAT	·	3.0 km	MPC · JPL
373911	2003 UO_{106}	—	October 18, 2003	Palomar	NEAT	·	3.3 km	MPC · JPL
373912	2003 UT_{114}	—	October 20, 2003	Kitt Peak	Spacewatch	·	810 m	MPC · JPL
373913	2003 UT_{125}	—	October 20, 2003	Kitt Peak	Spacewatch	·	690 m	MPC · JPL
373914	2003 UL_{129}	—	October 18, 2003	Palomar	NEAT	·	2.1 km	MPC · JPL
373915	2003 UO_{129}	—	October 18, 2003	Palomar	NEAT	·	860 m	MPC · JPL
373916	2003 UC_{137}	—	October 21, 2003	Socorro	LINEAR	(883)	870 m	MPC · JPL
373917	2003 UN_{158}	—	October 20, 2003	Kitt Peak	Spacewatch	EOS	1.6 km	MPC · JPL
373918	2003 UH_{161}	—	October 21, 2003	Kitt Peak	Spacewatch	·	1.9 km	MPC · JPL
373919	2003 UN_{182}	—	October 21, 2003	Palomar	NEAT	EOS	2.1 km	MPC · JPL
373920	2003 UU_{194}	—	October 20, 2003	Kitt Peak	Spacewatch	·	700 m	MPC · JPL
373921	2003 UH_{200}	—	September 28, 2003	Kitt Peak	Spacewatch	·	650 m	MPC · JPL
373922	2003 UH_{201}	—	October 21, 2003	Socorro	LINEAR	·	4.4 km	MPC · JPL
373923	2003 UN_{219}	—	October 21, 2003	Kitt Peak	Spacewatch	·	920 m	MPC · JPL
373924	2003 UD_{227}	—	October 23, 2003	Kitt Peak	Spacewatch	·	740 m	MPC · JPL
373925	2003 UV_{236}	—	September 28, 2003	Socorro	LINEAR	·	820 m	MPC · JPL
373926	2003 UE_{243}	—	October 24, 2003	Socorro	LINEAR	NYS	960 m	MPC · JPL
373927	2003 UX_{246}	—	October 24, 2003	Kitt Peak	Spacewatch	KOR	1.9 km	MPC · JPL
373928	2003 UD_{247}	—	October 24, 2003	Socorro	LINEAR	·	3.8 km	MPC · JPL
373929	2003 UV_{248}	—	October 20, 2003	Kitt Peak	Spacewatch	·	940 m	MPC · JPL
373930	2003 UN_{256}	—	October 25, 2003	Socorro	LINEAR	·	720 m	MPC · JPL
373931	2003 UT_{256}	—	October 25, 2003	Socorro	LINEAR	·	1.7 km	MPC · JPL
373932	2003 UA_{286}	—	September 28, 2003	Kitt Peak	Spacewatch	EOS	1.8 km	MPC · JPL
373933	2003 UP_{287}	—	October 21, 2003	Palomar	NEAT	·	2.0 km	MPC · JPL
373934	2003 UG_{288}	—	October 23, 2003	Kitt Peak	M. W. Buie	·	890 m	MPC · JPL
373935	2003 UO_{295}	—	October 16, 2003	Kitt Peak	Spacewatch	EOS	1.8 km	MPC · JPL
373936	2003 UV_{298}	—	October 16, 2003	Palomar	NEAT	·	2.1 km	MPC · JPL
373937	2003 UM_{311}	—	October 28, 2003	Socorro	LINEAR	·	2.2 km	MPC · JPL
373938	2003 UM_{323}	—	October 16, 2003	Kitt Peak	Spacewatch	KOR	1.3 km	MPC · JPL
373939	2003 UR_{329}	—	October 17, 2003	Apache Point	SDSS	·	2.1 km	MPC · JPL
373940	2003 US_{354}	—	October 19, 2003	Kitt Peak	Spacewatch	BRA	1.5 km	MPC · JPL
373941	2003 UL_{363}	—	October 20, 2003	Kitt Peak	Spacewatch	·	2.6 km	MPC · JPL
373942	2003 UJ_{372}	—	October 22, 2003	Apache Point	SDSS	·	830 m	MPC · JPL
373943	2003 UJ_{375}	—	October 22, 2003	Apache Point	SDSS	·	1.8 km	MPC · JPL
373944	2003 UU_{397}	—	October 22, 2003	Apache Point	SDSS	·	3.0 km	MPC · JPL
373945	2003 UA_{403}	—	October 23, 2003	Apache Point	SDSS	KOR	1.4 km	MPC · JPL
373946	2003 UT_{408}	—	October 23, 2003	Apache Point	SDSS	·	710 m	MPC · JPL
373947	2003 VC_{10}	—	November 14, 2003	Palomar	NEAT	PHO	1.5 km	MPC · JPL
373948	2003 WZ	—	November 16, 2003	Catalina	CSS	EOS	2.3 km	MPC · JPL
373949	2003 WW_{10}	—	November 18, 2003	Palomar	NEAT	·	950 m	MPC · JPL
373950	2003 WT_{24}	—	November 20, 2003	Socorro	LINEAR	H	620 m	MPC · JPL
373951	2003 WF_{31}	—	November 18, 2003	Palomar	NEAT	·	740 m	MPC · JPL
373952	2003 WK_{48}	—	November 18, 2003	Kitt Peak	Spacewatch	·	690 m	MPC · JPL
373953	2003 WP_{61}	—	November 19, 2003	Kitt Peak	Spacewatch	·	650 m	MPC · JPL
373954	2003 WN_{62}	—	November 19, 2003	Kitt Peak	Spacewatch	·	3.0 km	MPC · JPL
373955	2003 WH_{69}	—	November 19, 2003	Kitt Peak	Spacewatch	·	5.4 km	MPC · JPL
373956	2003 WS_{76}	—	November 19, 2003	Kitt Peak	Spacewatch	(2076)	650 m	MPC · JPL
373957	2003 WK_{78}	—	November 20, 2003	Socorro	LINEAR	·	2.8 km	MPC · JPL
373958	2003 WB_{91}	—	October 28, 2003	Socorro	LINEAR	·	800 m	MPC · JPL
373959	2003 WB_{99}	—	November 20, 2003	Socorro	LINEAR	·	2.4 km	MPC · JPL
373960	2003 WN_{110}	—	November 20, 2003	Socorro	LINEAR	·	2.3 km	MPC · JPL
373961	2003 WJ_{144}	—	November 21, 2003	Socorro	LINEAR	·	810 m	MPC · JPL
373962	2003 WM_{159}	—	November 29, 2003	Socorro	LINEAR	·	2.6 km	MPC · JPL
373963	2003 WV_{182}	—	November 22, 2003	Kitt Peak	M. W. Buie	·	2.2 km	MPC · JPL
373964	2003 WV_{190}	—	November 16, 2003	Catalina	CSS	·	730 m	MPC · JPL
373965	2003 WD_{194}	—	November 24, 2003	Kitt Peak	Spacewatch	·	1.6 km	MPC · JPL
373966	2003 XO_{4}	—	December 1, 2003	Socorro	LINEAR	·	5.1 km	MPC · JPL
373967	2003 XJ_{5}	—	December 1, 2003	Kitt Peak	Spacewatch	EMA	6.4 km	MPC · JPL
373968	2003 XA_{29}	—	December 1, 2003	Kitt Peak	Spacewatch	EOS	1.8 km	MPC · JPL
373969	2003 YM_{4}	—	December 16, 2003	Anderson Mesa	LONEOS	·	910 m	MPC · JPL
373970	2003 YM_{10}	—	December 17, 2003	Socorro	LINEAR	·	3.6 km	MPC · JPL
373971	2003 YB_{48}	—	December 18, 2003	Socorro	LINEAR	·	2.1 km	MPC · JPL
373972	2003 YK_{48}	—	December 18, 2003	Socorro	LINEAR	EOS	2.2 km	MPC · JPL
373973	2003 YP_{55}	—	December 19, 2003	Socorro	LINEAR	·	3.3 km	MPC · JPL
373974	2003 YW_{79}	—	December 18, 2003	Socorro	LINEAR	·	1.7 km	MPC · JPL
373975	2003 YW_{95}	—	December 1, 2003	Socorro	LINEAR	·	850 m	MPC · JPL
373976	2003 YJ_{99}	—	December 19, 2003	Socorro	LINEAR	·	3.7 km	MPC · JPL
373977	2003 YP_{111}	—	December 23, 2003	Socorro	LINEAR	·	4.7 km	MPC · JPL
373978	2003 YN_{126}	—	December 27, 2003	Socorro	LINEAR	·	930 m	MPC · JPL
373979	2003 YM_{132}	—	December 28, 2003	Socorro	LINEAR	·	3.2 km	MPC · JPL
373980	2003 YQ_{137}	—	December 27, 2003	Socorro	LINEAR	·	3.9 km	MPC · JPL
373981	2003 YW_{141}	—	December 28, 2003	Socorro	LINEAR	·	3.4 km	MPC · JPL
373982	2003 YZ_{141}	—	December 28, 2003	Socorro	LINEAR	·	2.0 km	MPC · JPL
373983	2003 YG_{160}	—	December 17, 2003	Socorro	LINEAR	·	6.4 km	MPC · JPL
373984	2003 YE_{163}	—	December 17, 2003	Socorro	LINEAR	·	2.3 km	MPC · JPL
373985	2003 YL_{165}	—	December 17, 2003	Kitt Peak	Spacewatch	L5	10 km	MPC · JPL
373986	2004 AK	—	January 11, 2004	Wrightwood	J. W. Young	VER	3.5 km	MPC · JPL
373987	2004 AG_{25}	—	January 15, 2004	Kitt Peak	Spacewatch	·	2.5 km	MPC · JPL
373988	2004 BU_{3}	—	January 16, 2004	Palomar	NEAT	(159)	3.0 km	MPC · JPL
373989	2004 BX_{9}	—	January 16, 2004	Palomar	NEAT	·	4.2 km	MPC · JPL
373990	2004 BE_{14}	—	January 17, 2004	Palomar	NEAT	·	2.0 km	MPC · JPL
373991	2004 BB_{28}	—	January 18, 2004	Palomar	NEAT	·	2.0 km	MPC · JPL
373992	2004 BN_{31}	—	January 19, 2004	Anderson Mesa	LONEOS	·	680 m	MPC · JPL
373993	2004 BP_{35}	—	January 19, 2004	Kitt Peak	Spacewatch	THM	2.1 km	MPC · JPL
373994	2004 BW_{40}	—	January 21, 2004	Socorro	LINEAR	·	1.0 km	MPC · JPL
373995	2004 BZ_{66}	—	January 24, 2004	Socorro	LINEAR	·	910 m	MPC · JPL
373996	2004 BU_{71}	—	January 23, 2004	Socorro	LINEAR	·	1.1 km	MPC · JPL
373997	2004 BM_{82}	—	January 27, 2004	Anderson Mesa	LONEOS	·	3.8 km	MPC · JPL
373998	2004 BG_{92}	—	January 26, 2004	Anderson Mesa	LONEOS	·	4.6 km	MPC · JPL
373999	2004 BS_{115}	—	January 30, 2004	Catalina	CSS	·	4.6 km	MPC · JPL
374000	2004 BT_{119}	—	January 30, 2004	Catalina	CSS	·	3.4 km	MPC · JPL

back to top

== See also ==
- Meanings of minor-planet names: 373001–374000
