= NGC 4129 =

Galaxy in the constellation Virgo

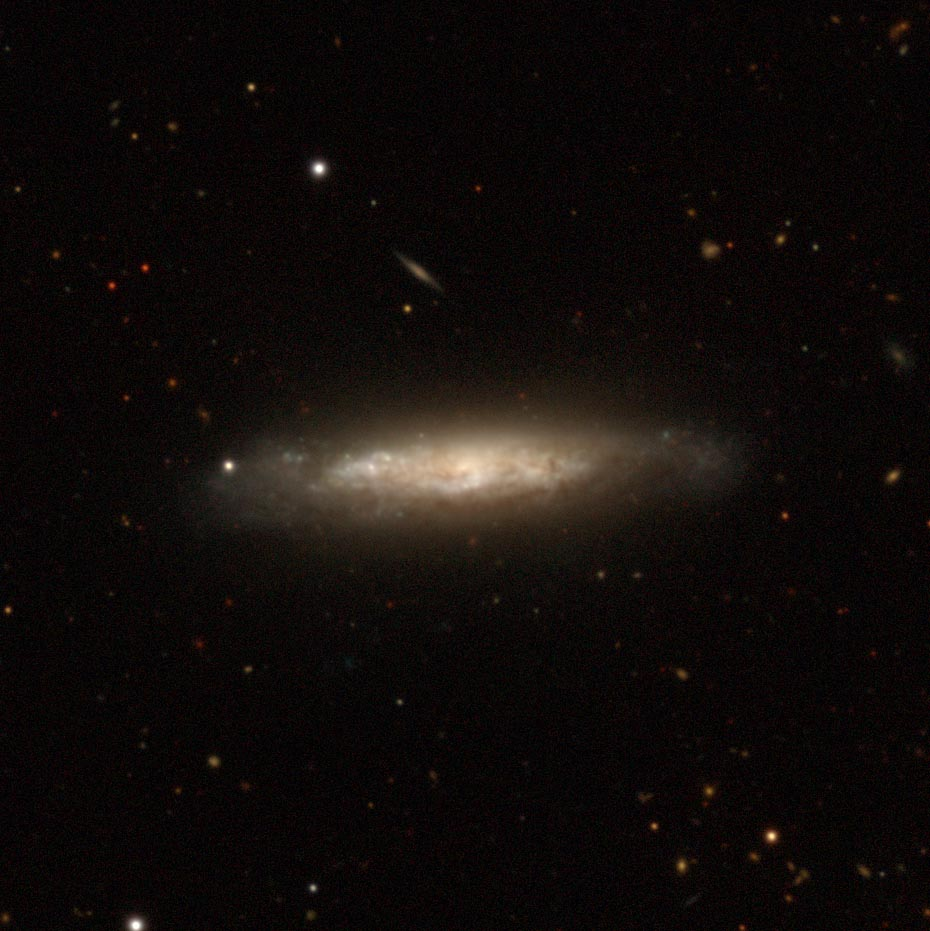
- NGC 4129 imaged by Legacy Surveys

Observation data (J2000 epoch)
- Constellation: Virgo
- Right ascension: 12^{h} 08^{m} 53.2828^{s}
- Declination: −09° 02′ 12.127″
- Redshift: 0.003916
- Heliocentric radial velocity: 1,174±1 km/s
- Distance: 73.8 ± 5.3 Mly (22.62 ± 1.63 Mpc)
- Apparent magnitude (V): 12.5

Characteristics
- Type: SB(s)ab? edge-on
- Size: ~48,000 ly (14.72 kpc) (estimated)
- Apparent size (V): 2.3′ × 0.6′

Other designations
- IRAS 12063-0845, NGC 4130, MCG -01-31-006, PGC 38580

NGC 4129 is a barred spiral galaxy in the constellation of Virgo. Its velocity with respect to the cosmic microwave background for is 1,534±25 km/s, which corresponds to a Hubble distance of 73.8 ± 5.3 Mly (22.62 ± 1.63 Mpc). Additionally, 12 non-redshift measurements give a distance of 67.21 ± 2.35 Mly (20.608 ± 0.721 Mpc). It was discovered by German-British astronomer William Herschel on 3 March 1786. It was also observed by Heinrich d'Arrest on 15 March 1866, causing it to be listed twice in the New General Catalogue, as NGC 4129 and as NGC 4130.

== Supernovae ==
Two supernovae have been observed in NGC 4129:

- SN 1954aa (type unknown, mag. 19.9) was discovered by Fritz Zwicky on 2 April 1954.
- SN 2002E (Type II, mag. 19.9) was discovered by LOTOSS (Lick Observatory and Tenagra Observatory Supernova Searches) on 16 January 2002.

== See also ==
- List of NGC objects (4001–5000)
