= C/2014 B1 (Schwartz) =

Parabolic comet

Discovery
- Discovered by: Michael B. Schwartz
- Discovery site: Tenagra Observatory
- Discovery date: 28 January 2014

Orbital characteristics
- Epoch: 16 February 2018 (JD 2458165.5)
- Observation arc: 8.24 years
- Number of observations: 1,276
- Perihelion: 9.557 AU
- Eccentricity: 1.00321
- Inclination: 28.376°
- Longitude of ascending node: 161.39°
- Argument of periapsis: 345.86°
- Last perihelion: 10 September 2017
- Earth MOID: 8.575 AU
- Jupiter MOID: 4.231 AU

Physical characteristics
- Mean radius: 6.364±0.214 km
- Mean density: 440±60 kg/m^{3}
- Spectral type: (B–V) = 0.85±0.03; (V–R) = 0.93±0.19; (B–R) = 1.43±0.03
- Comet total magnitude (M1): 6.2
- Apparent magnitude: 15.0 (2017 apparition)

C/2014 B1 (Schwartz) is a distant parabolic comet with a perihelion distance of 9.56 AU (1.430 billion km) from the Sun.

== Observational history ==
=== Discovery ===
American astronomer Michael B. Schwartz, discovered the comet in the early evening of 28 January 2014 using an astrograph from the Tenagra Observatory near Nogales, Arizona. At the time of discovery, it was about 12.0 AU (1.80 billion km) from the Sun. Subsequent observations from several other observatories across the world confirmed its cometary nature on 29 January.

=== Follow-up observations ===
The comet reached perihelion on September 2017, reaching its maximum recorded brightness as a 15th-magnitude object. In 2021, the comet was already 1.61 billion km (1.00 billion mi) from Earth and was observed near the galaxy PGC 48046, where it was expected to remain brighter than magnitude 20.0 until 2023 at the earliest.

== Physical characteristics ==
Observations from the NEOWISE mission revealed that due to the comet's large perihelion distance, which is too cold for water ice to sublimate, cometary activity in this object is mostly driven by carbon dioxide and carbon monoxide gases. This phenomenon is also observed from other comets with similarly distant perihelia, like C/2010 U3 and C/2017 K2.

It is noted that from ground observations, the comet had a morphologically stable discus-shaped coma, which had increased in brightness by 1.0 by the time it reached perihelion in 2017.

Initial estimates of the size of its nucleus in 2019 were roughly 2–10 km (1.2–6.2 mi) in radius. Reanalysis of a 2017 photographic observation of the comet about a year later has refined its effective radius to 6.364±0.214 km, using a new method where the absolute brightness of the nucleus is inferred from the measured brightness distribution in the coma using a mathematical model.

Spectral and polarimetric observations of the comet from the Smithsonian Astrophysical Observatory (SAO) reveal the color of the jet structures is much redder than that of the ambient coma, and the nucleus itself also has a reddish color.
