= Tenagra Observatories =

Collection of US observatories

Tenagra Observatory
- Observatory code: 848
- Location: Lane County, Oregon near Cottage Grove
- Coordinates: 43°42′8.72″N 122°58′41.16″W
- Altitude: 207 m (679 ft)
- Established: 1998

Telescopes
- Tenagra I: 14 in (360 mm) f/11 Schmidt-Cassegrain

Tenagra II Observatory
- Observatory code: 926
- Location: Santa Cruz County, Arizona near Patagonia, Arizona
- Coordinates: 31°27′43.36″N 110°52′44.76″W
- Altitude: 4,003 ft (1,220 m)
- Established: 2000

Telescopes
- Tenagra II: 32 in (810 mm) Ritchey-Chretien
- Pearl: 16 in (410 mm) f/3.75 Newtonian
- Tenagra IV: 14 in (360 mm) SCT

Tenagra Observatory and Tenagra Observatory II are astronomical observatories in Cottage Grove, Oregon and Arizona. The observatories house heavily automated robotic telescopes.

Circa 2016, the observatory was utilized with the Katzman Automatic Imaging Telescope a member of the Lick Observatory and Tenagra Observatory Supernova Searches (LOTOSS).

Beginning in 2018, after a NASA grant to owner Michael Schwartz expired, control of the Arizona observatory was turned over to Gianluca Masi's Virtual Telescope project.

== Instruments ==
The observatory near Cottage Grove, Oregon was constructed c. 1998, and had a 14-inch (360 mm) Celestron Schmidt-Cassegrain with a SBIG CCD imager, probably upgraded to Apogee Instruments later.

The Arizona observatory at Patagonia, 20 miles from Nogales, began operations in 2000. Tenagra II is a custom-made 32-inch (810 mm) Ritchey-Chretien telescope manufactured by SciTech Astronomical Research, in operation since 2001. "Pearl" is a 16-inch (410 mm) f/3.75 corrected Newtonian. There is also a 24-inch (610 mm) SciTech Ritchey-Chretien, and another 14-inch Celestron.

The Oregon site was in use as of 2004 as a backup site, during the Southwest monsoon season.

== Observations and public outreach ==
The robotic telescopes can image 1,000 galaxies in an evening for supernova discovery. Using the Oregon Tenagra I telescope, its maker became "the first amateur to achieve consistent supernova discoveries" by using a robotic telescope "to patrol hundreds of galaxies each night".

The Oregon observatory reported 77 Minor Planet Electronic Circulars between 1999 and 2002.

The Oregon observatory discovered supernova SN 1997cx.

Paulo R. Holvorcem (Porto Seguro, Bahia, Brazil) and Michael Schwartz (Patagonia, Arizona) discovered comet C/2011 K1 (Schwartz-Holvorcem) in May 2011. Schwartz also independently discovered two comets, P/2013 T2 and C/2014 B1, at Tenagra.

Comet 274P/Tombaugh-Tenagra is named for the observatory and Clyde Tombaugh. Tombaugh initially discovered it in January 1931, but was not recovered until 2012. It was provisionally named Comet P/2012 WX_32 (Tenagra) when recovered by Michael Schwartz and Paulo R. Holvorcem using Tenagra II.

The observatory's Tenagra IV instrument, along with Palomar Observatory's Samuel Oschin telescope, was the second to image dwarf planet Sedna, providing confirmation of its discovery and refining its orbital parameters.

In 2018, Pearl imaged the Tesla Roadster in space, when it had a magnitude of 15.5, comparable to Pluto's moon Charon.

In 2018, imagery from the Arizona observatory was livestreamed by Gianluca Masi during the 2018 DV_{1} close approach to Earth as a Virtual Telescope project outreach event. Images of the Tiangong-1 space station in its decaying orbit were livestreamed in 2018, a few days before reentry.

== Awards ==
2013 Edgar Wilson Award

== See also ==
- List of asteroid-discovering observatories#Tenagra II Observatory
- List of minor planet discoverers
- "Darmok"
- Winer Observatory
