= 2018 DV1 =

Near-Earth micro-asteroid

2018 DV_{1}
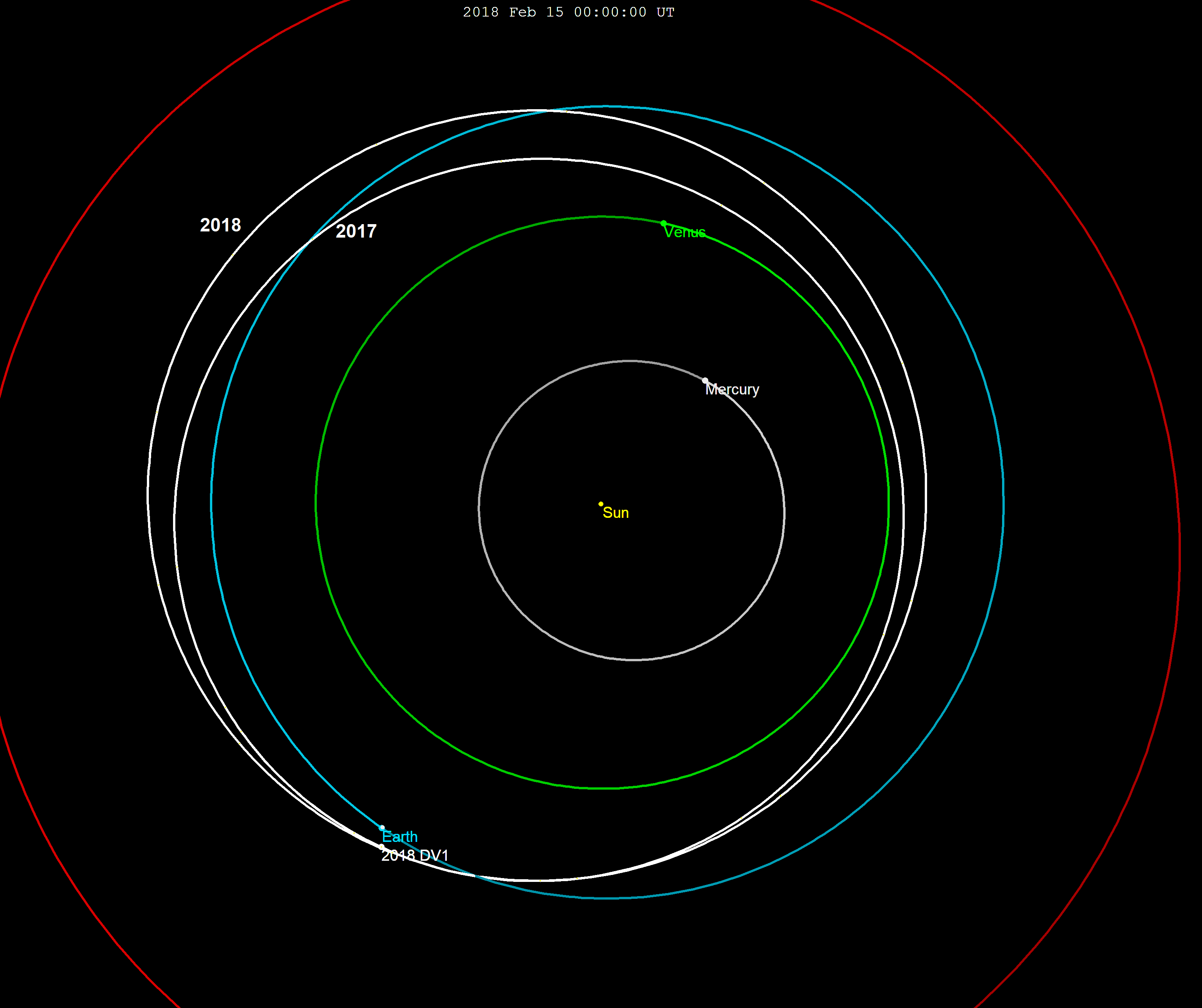
- Orbit before and after 2018 flyby

Discovery
- Discovered by: Mount Lemmon Srvy.
- Discovery site: Mount Lemon Obs.
- Discovery date: 26 February 2018 (first observed only)

Designations
- Minor planet category: NEO · Aten

Orbital characteristics
- Epoch 23 March 2018 (JD 2458200.5)
- Uncertainty parameter 5
- Observation arc: 1 day
- Aphelion: 1.1494 AU
- Perihelion: 0.8230 AU
- Semi-major axis: 0.9862 AU
- Eccentricity: 0.1655
- Orbital period (sidereal): 358 days
- Mean anomaly: 298.67°
- Mean motion: 1° 0^{m} 23.04^{s} / day
- Inclination: 5.1554°
- Longitude of ascending node: 341.12°
- Argument of perihelion: 281.37°
- Earth MOID: 0.000159 AU (0.062 LD)

Physical characteristics
- Mean diameter: 6 m (est. at 0.20); 12 m (est. at 0.057)
- Absolute magnitude (H): 28.4

2018 DV_{1} is a micro-asteroid, classified as a near-Earth object of the Aten group, approximately 6–12 meters (20–40 feet) in diameter. It was first observed on 26 February 2018, by astronomers of the Mount Lemmon Survey at Mount Lemmon Observatory, Arizona, five days prior to its sub-lunar close encounter with Earth at less than 0.3 lunar distance.

== Orbit and classification ==
2018 DV_{1} belongs to the Aten group of asteroids, which cross the orbit of Earth. Contrary to the much larger Apollos, Atens have a semi-major axis of less than 1 AU, that is, a period less than a year (Earth).

Based on an observation arc of less than 2 days, it orbits the Sun at a distance of 0.82–1.15 AU once every 12 months (358 days; semi-major axis of 0.986 AU). Its orbit has an eccentricity of 0.17 and an inclination of 5° with respect to the ecliptic. The body's observation arc begins at Mount Lemmon with its first observation.

=== Close encounters ===
==== 2018 flyby ====
On 2 March 2018, at 05:54 UT, this object passed Earth at a nominal distance of 0.29 LD (0.00075 AU) which corresponds to a distance of 112,600 kilometres (70,000 miles). The object also approached the Moon at a similar distance of 133,300 km (82,800 mi) the day before. It was the 18th known asteroid to flyby Earth within 1 lunar distance (LD) since the start of 2018 and 6th closest. Five days earlier, a similar object, 2018 DU, came within 175,000 miles (284,000 km). However, the two encounters were unrelated and neither of them represent any hazard to the Earth (also see List of asteroid close approaches to Earth in 2018 § List).

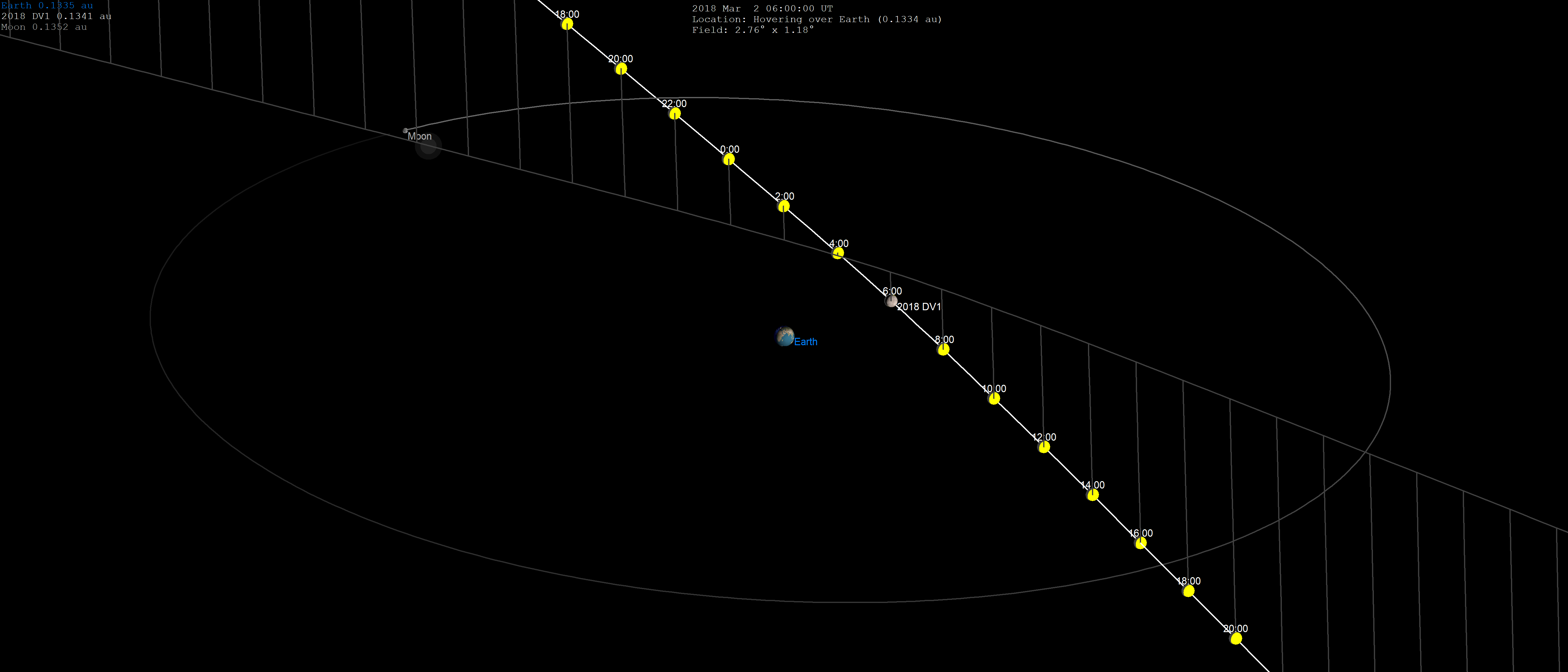
Motion of asteroid near earth-moon

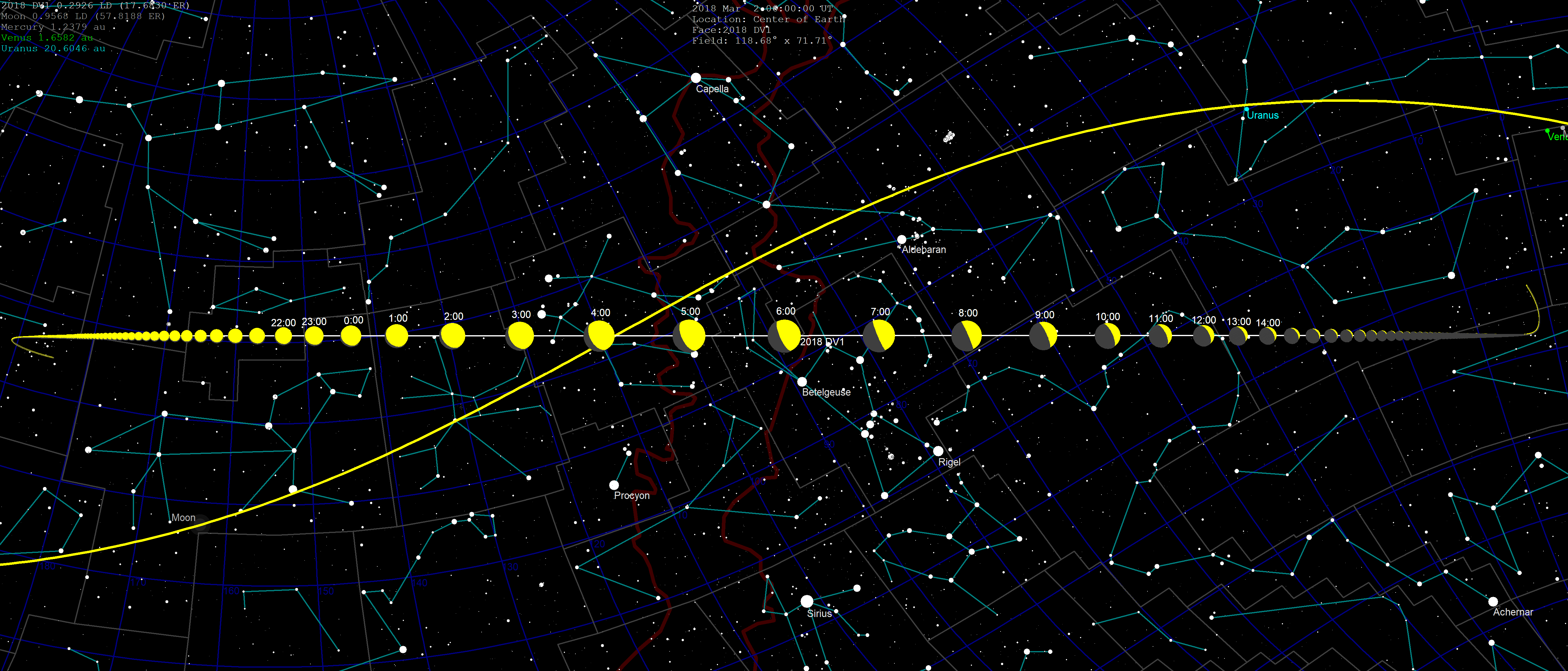
Hourly motion of asteroid across sky on 2 March 2018

==== MOID and projections ====
2018 DV_{1} has a notably low minimum orbital intersection distance with Earth of 23,800 km (0.000159 AU), or 0.06 LD. The asteroid's next encounter with Earth will be on 26 February 2019 at a much larger distance of 51 LD (0.130 AU). It closest future approach is predicted to occur on 28 February 2064, then at a nominal distance of 24 LD (0.0628 AU).

== Physical characteristics ==
Based on a generic magnitude-to-diameter conversion, 2018 DV_{1} measures between 6 and 12 meters in diameter, for an absolute magnitude of 28.4, and an assumed albedo between 0.057 and 0.20, which represent typical values for carbonaceous and stony asteroids, respectively. As of 2018, no rotational lightcurve of this object has been obtained from photometric observations. The body's rotation period, pole and shape remain unknown.

== Numbering and naming ==
This minor planet has neither been numbered nor named.
