= Meanings of minor-planet names: 132001–133000 =

As minor planet discoveries are confirmed, they are given a permanent number by the IAU's Minor Planet Center (MPC), and the discoverers can then submit names for them, following the IAU's naming conventions. The list below concerns those minor planets in the specified number-range that have received names, and explains the meanings of those names.

Official naming citations of newly named small Solar System bodies are approved and published in a bulletin by IAU's Working Group for Small Bodies Nomenclature (WGSBN). Before May 2021, citations were published in MPC's Minor Planet Circulars for many decades. Recent citations can also be found on the JPL Small-Body Database (SBDB). Until his death in 2016, German astronomer Lutz D. Schmadel compiled these citations into the Dictionary of Minor Planet Names (DMP) and regularly updated the collection.

Based on Paul Herget's The Names of the Minor Planets, Schmadel also researched the unclear origin of numerous asteroids, most of which had been named prior to World War II. This article incorporates text from this source, which is in the public domain: SBDB New namings may only be added to this list below after official publication as the preannouncement of names is condemned. The WGSBN publishes a comprehensive guideline for the naming rules of non-cometary small Solar System bodies.

== 132001–132100 ==
Named minor planet	Provisional	This minor planet was named for...	Ref · Catalog
132005 Scottmcgregor	2002 CN_{99}	Scott A. McGregor (born 1956), Chief Executive, first president and chairman of the Broadcom Foundation, supported the Broadcom MASTERS, a Society for Science & the Public program, that inspires middle schools students worldwide to participate in a science competition.	JPL · 132005

== 132101–132200 ==
back to top

Named minor planet	Provisional	This minor planet was named for...	Ref · Catalog
There are no named minor planets in this number range

== 132201–132300 ==
back to top

Named minor planet	Provisional	This minor planet was named for...	Ref · Catalog
There are no named minor planets in this number range

== 132301–132400 ==
back to top

Named minor planet	Provisional	This minor planet was named for...	Ref · Catalog
132329 Tomandert	2002 GL_{31}	Thomas P. Andert (b. 1973), a German planetary scientist from the University of Bundeswehr Munich in Germany.	IAU · 132329

== 132401–132500 ==
back to top

Named minor planet	Provisional	This minor planet was named for...	Ref · Catalog
132445 Gaertner	2002 GD_{178}	Christian Gärtner (1705–1782), German craftsman, merchant, amateur astronomer, and astronomy populariser	JPL · 132445

== 132501–132600 ==
back to top

Named minor planet	Provisional	This minor planet was named for...	Ref · Catalog
132524 APL	2002 JF_{56}	The Johns Hopkins Applied Physics Laboratory (APL), developers of numerous space missions, including NEAR Shoemaker and many others	JPL · 132524

== 132601–132700 ==
back to top

Named minor planet	Provisional	This minor planet was named for...	Ref · Catalog
132661 Carlbaeker	2002 LO_{60}	Carl Wilhelm Baeker (1819–1882), German watchmaker and amateur astronomer, discoverer and co-discoverer of six comets	IAU · 132668
132668 Brunobozzetto	2002 NA_{6}	Bruno Bozzetto, Italian cartoonist, film director and illustrator.	IAU · 132661

== 132701–132800 ==
back to top

Named minor planet	Provisional	This minor planet was named for...	Ref · Catalog
132718 Kemény	2002 ON_{27}	John George Kemeny or Kemény János György (1926–1992), Hungarian-born American mathematician, co-developer of the BASIC programming language	JPL · 132718
132719 Lambey	2002 PF	Bernard Lambey (born 1934), French animator and popularizer of astronomy, co-founder of the Astronomical Society of Montpellier	JPL · 132719
132741 Liliacapocaccia	2002 PU_{33}	Lilia Capocaccia (1932–2024), Italian naturalist and reptile expert.	JPL · 132741
132791 Jeremybauman	2002 PY_{149}	Jeremy A. Bauman (b. 1983), an American engineer at KinetX Aerospace.	IAU · 132791
132792 Scottsmith	2002 PB_{152}	P. Scott Smith (born 1922), American physics teacher, primarily responsible for inspiring the discoverer to become an astronomer	JPL · 132792
132798 Kürti	2002 PU_{167}	Stefan Kürti (born 1960), Slovakian amateur astronomer and discoverer of minor planets	JPL · 132798

== 132801–132900 ==
back to top

Named minor planet	Provisional	This minor planet was named for...	Ref · Catalog
132820 Miskotte	2002 QX_{65}	Koen Miskotte (born 1962), Dutch confectioner and amateur astronomer, active within the Dutch Meteor Society	JPL · 132820
132824 Galamb	2002 QE_{79}	József Galamb (1881–1955), a Hungarian-American mechanical engineer	JPL · 132824
132825 Shizu-Mao	2002 QT_{85}	Ye Mao (Shiqing; 1231–1322), Chinese chief executive of Zibei County (now Wenchang City), Shizu ("earliest ancestor") of the discoverer Ye Quan-Zhi	JPL · 132825
132874 Latinovits	2002 RV_{118}	Zoltán Latinovits (1931–1976), a Hungarian actor. This minor planet was discovered on the actor's 71st birth anniversary, on 9 September 2002.	JPL · 132874

== 132901–133000 ==
back to top

Named minor planet	Provisional	This minor planet was named for...	Ref · Catalog
132903 Edgibson	2002 RG_{234}	Edward Gibson (born 1936) was one of the first scientist-astronauts, selected for NASA Group 4 in 1965. He was CAPCOM for Apollo 12 and science pilot for Skylab 4, setting a new spaceflight record and conducting landmark solar research. Ed is also a noted author and U.S. Astronaut Hall of Fame inductee.	IAU · 132903
132904 Notkin	2002 RB_{237}	Geoffrey Notkin (born 1961), co-host of the popular Science Channel series Meteorite Men	JPL · 132904

back to top

Preceded by 131,001–132,000	Meanings of minor-planet names List of minor planets: 132,001–133,000	Succeeded by 133,001–134,000
