= Echeclus =

Scientific classification
- Kingdom: Animalia
- Phylum: Arthropoda
- Subphylum: Chelicerata
- Class: Arachnida
- Order: Araneae
- Infraorder: Araneomorphae
- Family: Salticidae
- Subfamily: Salticinae
- Genus: Echeclus; Thorell, 1890

Genus of spiders

Echeclus is a genus of the spider family Salticidae (jumping spiders).

One of its two described species, E. concinnus, is endemic to Malaysia. The species was originally described by Thorell from a single male specimen from Penang. It is preserved in the Museo Civico of Genoa. Another male specimen was found in Johor by Frances and John Murphy.

The other species, E. sokoli, is found in Borneo.
