= Lilia Capocaccia =

Italian herpetologist, museum director (1932–2024)

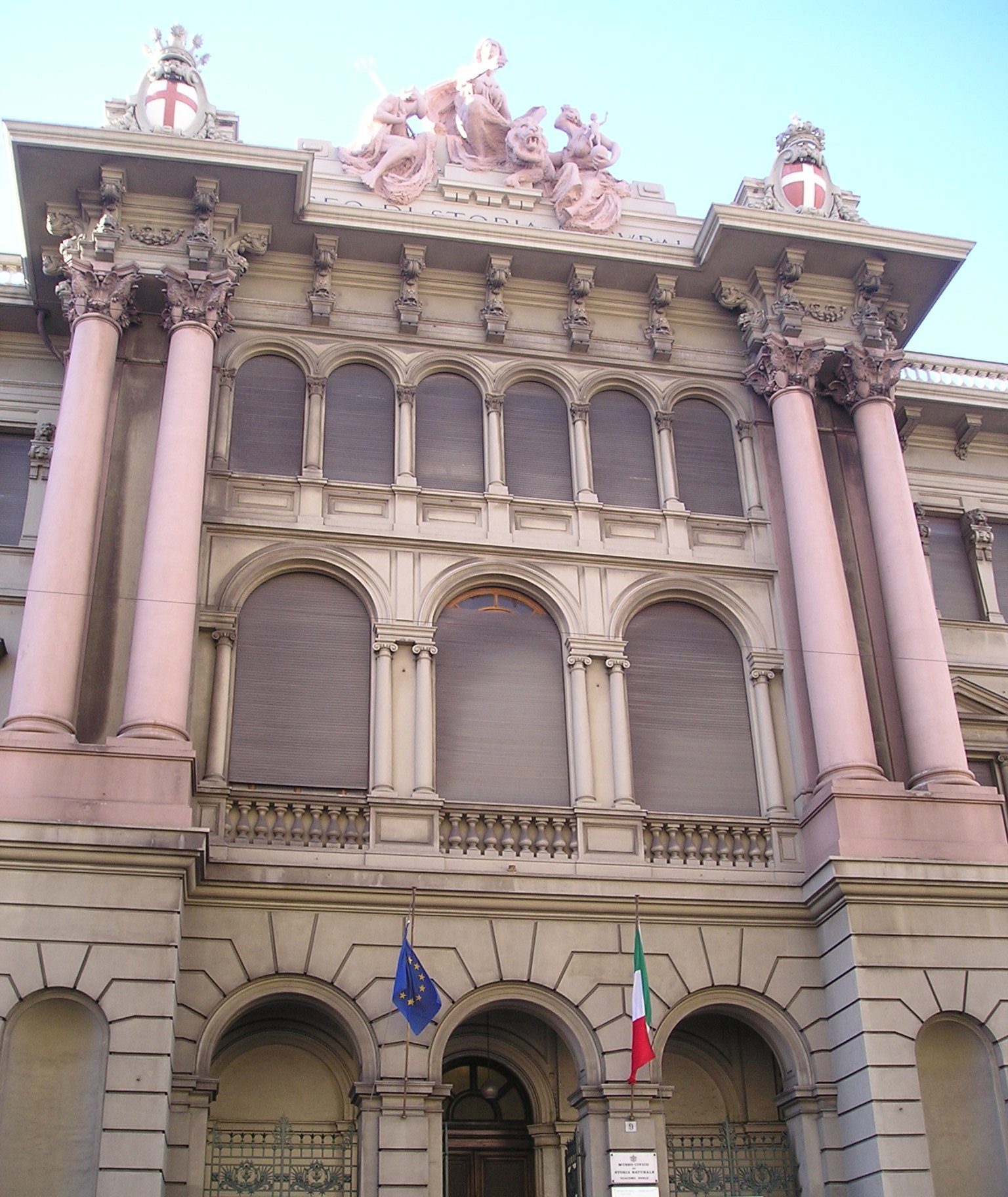
The Doria Natural History Museum, Genoa, Italy

Lilia Capocaccia (married name: Lilia Capocaccia Orsini) (1932–2024) was an Italian herpetologist and the first woman to serve as director of the Giacomo Doria Natural History Museum, the oldest museum in Genoa, Italy. Before that appointment, she was the coordinator of the museums of the Genoa Municipality.

== Biography ==
She was born in 1932 to Agostino Capocaccia, professor of Applied Mechanics for Machines, and poet Alessandra Quadri. Alessandra was known as a woman of great courage and near the end of World War II, she convinced the occupying German forces to spare the Piedmont comune of Rocca Grimalda, which was at risk of being destroyed.

Capocaccia's family home was called Villa Odero, and a part of the large family still lives there. She graduated with a bachelor's degree in Natural Sciences in 1953 and the next year she joined the scientific staff of the Doria Natural History Museum of Genoa. She was promoted to museum director in 1976.

Her early scientific publications revealed her interests in herpetology. Later works concerned the history of the museum.

From 1997 to 2021, she was president of the Friends of the Aquarium of Genoa association. After her death, the Friends association recalled her as "a woman and professional who always supported the Aquarium in building its role of cultural outreach and service to the city through the weekly Wednesday Science meetings, which offered important opportunities for free outreach and culture to so many Genoese and beyond."

After 20 years as the first and only female director of the Museum of Natural History, she retired in 1996, but remained an honorary curator. One obituary published by the Museum lauded Capocaccia as a woman of science and culture and went on to cite her skills in organization and outreach that had become evident in her work.

Lilia Capocaccia died on 19 August 2024, at 92, in her home on Via Orini in Genoa. She was survived by her husband Bruno Orsini, four daughters and 11 grandchildren.

== Legacy ==
The minor planet 132741 Liliacapocaccia, was named after her in 2002.

== Selected works ==
- Capocaccia, Lilia. Contributo allo studio della distribuzione geografica di Bitis lachesis somalica Parker (Ophidia, Viperidae). 1955.
- Capocaccia, Lilia. "Note preliminari sugli anfibi della Liguria." Italian Journal of Zoology 23, no. 2 (1956): 765-772.
- Capocaccia, Lilia. "Catalogo dei tipi di rettili del Museo Civico di Storia Naturale di Genova." Annali del Museo Civico di Storia Naturale di Genova 72 (1961): 86-111.
- Capocaccia, Lilia, and Gianna Arbocco. Collezioni e studi malacologici nel Museo di Stoira Naturale di Genova. 1963.
- Capocaccia, Lilia. "La Dermochelys coriacea (L.) nel Mediterraneo (Reptilia, Testudinata)." Atti Accad. Ligure Sc. Lett 24 (1968): 318-327.
- Capocaccia, Lilia, and Roberto Poggi. "Short history of the Museo Civico di Storia Naturale “Giacomo Doria” in Genoa, Italy." Archives of Natural History 11, no. 1 (1982): 107-122.
