= List of minor planets: 132001–133000 =

The following is a partial list of minor planets, running from minor-planet number 132001 through 133000, inclusive. The primary data for this and other partial lists is based on JPL's "Small-Body Orbital Elements" and data available from the Minor Planet Center. Critical list information is also provided by the MPC, unless otherwise specified from Lowell Observatory. A detailed description of the table's columns and additional sources are given on the main page including a complete list of every page in this series, and a statistical break-up on the dynamical classification of minor planets.

Also see the summary list of all named bodies in numerical and alphabetical order, and the corresponding naming citations for the number range of this particular list. New namings may only be added to this list after official publication, as the preannouncement of names is condemned by the Working Group for Small Bodies Nomenclature of the International Astronomical Union.

Near-Earth obj.	MBA (inner)	MBA (outer)	Centaur
Mars-crosser	MBA (middle)	Jupiter trojan	Trans-Neptunian obj.
Unclassified

== 132001–132100 ==
Designation			Discovery			Properties		Ref
Permanent	Provisional	Named after	Date	Site	Discoverer(s)	Category	Diam.	Ref
132001	2002 CB_{98}	—	February 7, 2002	Socorro	LINEAR	MAS	1.8 km	MPC · JPL
132002	2002 CP_{98}	—	February 7, 2002	Socorro	LINEAR	MAS ·	1.3 km	MPC · JPL
132003	2002 CB_{99}	—	February 7, 2002	Socorro	LINEAR	·	1.7 km	MPC · JPL
132004	2002 CK_{99}	—	February 7, 2002	Socorro	LINEAR	·	2.0 km	MPC · JPL
132005 Scottmcgregor	2002 CN_{99}	Scottmcgregor	February 7, 2002	Socorro	LINEAR	V	1.5 km	MPC · JPL
132006	2002 CU_{99}	—	February 7, 2002	Socorro	LINEAR	·	1.5 km	MPC · JPL
132007	2002 CC_{100}	—	February 7, 2002	Socorro	LINEAR	·	2.7 km	MPC · JPL
132008	2002 CG_{100}	—	February 7, 2002	Socorro	LINEAR	·	2.1 km	MPC · JPL
132009	2002 CL_{100}	—	February 7, 2002	Socorro	LINEAR	·	3.3 km	MPC · JPL
132010	2002 CO_{100}	—	February 7, 2002	Socorro	LINEAR	V	1.4 km	MPC · JPL
132011	2002 CM_{102}	—	February 7, 2002	Socorro	LINEAR	·	1.3 km	MPC · JPL
132012	2002 CV_{103}	—	February 7, 2002	Socorro	LINEAR	·	2.6 km	MPC · JPL
132013	2002 CU_{104}	—	February 7, 2002	Socorro	LINEAR	V	1.5 km	MPC · JPL
132014	2002 CL_{105}	—	February 7, 2002	Socorro	LINEAR	PHO	2.1 km	MPC · JPL
132015	2002 CT_{105}	—	February 7, 2002	Socorro	LINEAR	NYS	1.9 km	MPC · JPL
132016	2002 CZ_{105}	—	February 7, 2002	Socorro	LINEAR	·	2.1 km	MPC · JPL
132017	2002 CC_{106}	—	February 7, 2002	Socorro	LINEAR	NYS	2.1 km	MPC · JPL
132018	2002 CD_{107}	—	February 7, 2002	Socorro	LINEAR	NYS	1.9 km	MPC · JPL
132019	2002 CG_{108}	—	February 7, 2002	Socorro	LINEAR	·	2.3 km	MPC · JPL
132020	2002 CT_{109}	—	February 7, 2002	Socorro	LINEAR	MAS	1.2 km	MPC · JPL
132021	2002 CX_{111}	—	February 7, 2002	Socorro	LINEAR	NYS	3.4 km	MPC · JPL
132022	2002 CG_{112}	—	February 7, 2002	Socorro	LINEAR	·	1.7 km	MPC · JPL
132023	2002 CR_{112}	—	February 7, 2002	Socorro	LINEAR	NYS	2.5 km	MPC · JPL
132024	2002 CF_{114}	—	February 8, 2002	Socorro	LINEAR	NYS	2.1 km	MPC · JPL
132025	2002 CJ_{114}	—	February 8, 2002	Socorro	LINEAR	·	2.6 km	MPC · JPL
132026	2002 CO_{114}	—	February 8, 2002	Socorro	LINEAR	·	2.7 km	MPC · JPL
132027	2002 CE_{115}	—	February 9, 2002	Socorro	LINEAR	NYS	1.7 km	MPC · JPL
132028	2002 CN_{115}	—	February 14, 2002	Nashville	Clingan, R.	·	1.9 km	MPC · JPL
132029	2002 CB_{118}	—	February 14, 2002	Desert Eagle	W. K. Y. Yeung	·	2.0 km	MPC · JPL
132030	2002 CB_{119}	—	February 7, 2002	Socorro	LINEAR	·	1.3 km	MPC · JPL
132031	2002 CA_{121}	—	February 7, 2002	Socorro	LINEAR	·	1.1 km	MPC · JPL
132032	2002 CO_{123}	—	February 7, 2002	Socorro	LINEAR	·	1.7 km	MPC · JPL
132033	2002 CJ_{124}	—	February 7, 2002	Socorro	LINEAR	NYS ·	1.7 km	MPC · JPL
132034	2002 CM_{124}	—	February 7, 2002	Socorro	LINEAR	NYS	1.7 km	MPC · JPL
132035	2002 CQ_{124}	—	February 7, 2002	Socorro	LINEAR	·	1.7 km	MPC · JPL
132036	2002 CC_{125}	—	February 7, 2002	Socorro	LINEAR	MAS	1 km	MPC · JPL
132037	2002 CS_{127}	—	February 7, 2002	Socorro	LINEAR	V	980 m	MPC · JPL
132038	2002 CV_{128}	—	February 7, 2002	Socorro	LINEAR	·	1.4 km	MPC · JPL
132039	2002 CY_{128}	—	February 7, 2002	Socorro	LINEAR	NYS	1.6 km	MPC · JPL
132040	2002 CE_{129}	—	February 7, 2002	Socorro	LINEAR	NYS	1.6 km	MPC · JPL
132041	2002 CL_{129}	—	February 7, 2002	Socorro	LINEAR	·	1.5 km	MPC · JPL
132042	2002 CM_{130}	—	February 7, 2002	Socorro	LINEAR	·	1.4 km	MPC · JPL
132043	2002 CO_{131}	—	February 7, 2002	Socorro	LINEAR	·	2.4 km	MPC · JPL
132044	2002 CP_{132}	—	February 7, 2002	Socorro	LINEAR	MAS	1 km	MPC · JPL
132045	2002 CY_{132}	—	February 7, 2002	Socorro	LINEAR	MAS	1.2 km	MPC · JPL
132046	2002 CT_{134}	—	February 7, 2002	Socorro	LINEAR	(5)	1.8 km	MPC · JPL
132047	2002 CV_{136}	—	February 8, 2002	Socorro	LINEAR	·	2.3 km	MPC · JPL
132048	2002 CF_{137}	—	February 8, 2002	Socorro	LINEAR	·	1.3 km	MPC · JPL
132049	2002 CG_{137}	—	February 8, 2002	Socorro	LINEAR	·	1.4 km	MPC · JPL
132050	2002 CV_{138}	—	February 8, 2002	Socorro	LINEAR	·	2.2 km	MPC · JPL
132051	2002 CX_{138}	—	February 8, 2002	Socorro	LINEAR	V	1.3 km	MPC · JPL
132052	2002 CB_{139}	—	February 8, 2002	Socorro	LINEAR	·	1.3 km	MPC · JPL
132053	2002 CD_{139}	—	February 8, 2002	Socorro	LINEAR	·	1.4 km	MPC · JPL
132054	2002 CN_{139}	—	February 8, 2002	Socorro	LINEAR	·	2.1 km	MPC · JPL
132055	2002 CA_{140}	—	February 8, 2002	Socorro	LINEAR	·	2.3 km	MPC · JPL
132056	2002 CA_{141}	—	February 8, 2002	Socorro	LINEAR	ERI	3.6 km	MPC · JPL
132057	2002 CG_{141}	—	February 8, 2002	Socorro	LINEAR	·	1.9 km	MPC · JPL
132058	2002 CE_{142}	—	February 8, 2002	Socorro	LINEAR	·	1.9 km	MPC · JPL
132059	2002 CJ_{142}	—	February 8, 2002	Socorro	LINEAR	·	2.9 km	MPC · JPL
132060	2002 CH_{143}	—	February 9, 2002	Socorro	LINEAR	·	1.9 km	MPC · JPL
132061	2002 CX_{143}	—	February 9, 2002	Socorro	LINEAR	V	1.1 km	MPC · JPL
132062	2002 CR_{144}	—	February 9, 2002	Socorro	LINEAR	·	1.6 km	MPC · JPL
132063	2002 CZ_{145}	—	February 9, 2002	Socorro	LINEAR	NYS	1.9 km	MPC · JPL
132064	2002 CJ_{146}	—	February 9, 2002	Socorro	LINEAR	MAS	1.3 km	MPC · JPL
132065	2002 CX_{146}	—	February 9, 2002	Socorro	LINEAR	V	1.2 km	MPC · JPL
132066	2002 CE_{147}	—	February 9, 2002	Socorro	LINEAR	·	4.4 km	MPC · JPL
132067	2002 CQ_{147}	—	February 10, 2002	Socorro	LINEAR	·	1.7 km	MPC · JPL
132068	2002 CY_{150}	—	February 10, 2002	Socorro	LINEAR	·	1.7 km	MPC · JPL
132069	2002 CH_{152}	—	February 10, 2002	Socorro	LINEAR	·	2.3 km	MPC · JPL
132070	2002 CC_{154}	—	February 9, 2002	Kitt Peak	Spacewatch	·	1.6 km	MPC · JPL
132071	2002 CA_{159}	—	February 7, 2002	Socorro	LINEAR	NYS	1.9 km	MPC · JPL
132072	2002 CU_{159}	—	February 7, 2002	Socorro	LINEAR	·	3.0 km	MPC · JPL
132073	2002 CA_{160}	—	February 8, 2002	Socorro	LINEAR	·	2.0 km	MPC · JPL
132074	2002 CQ_{160}	—	February 8, 2002	Socorro	LINEAR	V	1.2 km	MPC · JPL
132075	2002 CC_{161}	—	February 8, 2002	Socorro	LINEAR	·	2.9 km	MPC · JPL
132076	2002 CN_{162}	—	February 8, 2002	Socorro	LINEAR	·	1.0 km	MPC · JPL
132077	2002 CW_{163}	—	February 8, 2002	Socorro	LINEAR	·	2.0 km	MPC · JPL
132078	2002 CE_{164}	—	February 8, 2002	Socorro	LINEAR	·	2.0 km	MPC · JPL
132079	2002 CG_{165}	—	February 8, 2002	Socorro	LINEAR	·	1.4 km	MPC · JPL
132080	2002 CS_{165}	—	February 8, 2002	Socorro	LINEAR	·	1.3 km	MPC · JPL
132081	2002 CX_{165}	—	February 8, 2002	Socorro	LINEAR	NYS	2.3 km	MPC · JPL
132082	2002 CY_{165}	—	February 8, 2002	Socorro	LINEAR	V	1.1 km	MPC · JPL
132083	2002 CG_{167}	—	February 8, 2002	Socorro	LINEAR	·	2.0 km	MPC · JPL
132084	2002 CS_{169}	—	February 8, 2002	Socorro	LINEAR	·	2.3 km	MPC · JPL
132085	2002 CV_{169}	—	February 8, 2002	Socorro	LINEAR	·	1.9 km	MPC · JPL
132086	2002 CN_{170}	—	February 8, 2002	Socorro	LINEAR	·	2.0 km	MPC · JPL
132087	2002 CA_{171}	—	February 8, 2002	Socorro	LINEAR	·	2.0 km	MPC · JPL
132088	2002 CY_{172}	—	February 8, 2002	Socorro	LINEAR	NYS	2.0 km	MPC · JPL
132089	2002 CG_{173}	—	February 8, 2002	Socorro	LINEAR	·	2.2 km	MPC · JPL
132090	2002 CV_{173}	—	February 8, 2002	Socorro	LINEAR	·	1.7 km	MPC · JPL
132091	2002 CC_{175}	—	February 9, 2002	Socorro	LINEAR	NYS ·	4.0 km	MPC · JPL
132092	2002 CR_{177}	—	February 10, 2002	Socorro	LINEAR	·	1.6 km	MPC · JPL
132093	2002 CW_{181}	—	February 10, 2002	Socorro	LINEAR	·	1.3 km	MPC · JPL
132094	2002 CH_{186}	—	February 10, 2002	Socorro	LINEAR	·	2.4 km	MPC · JPL
132095	2002 CD_{191}	—	February 10, 2002	Socorro	LINEAR	·	1.2 km	MPC · JPL
132096	2002 CW_{194}	—	February 10, 2002	Socorro	LINEAR	·	1.6 km	MPC · JPL
132097	2002 CE_{202}	—	February 10, 2002	Socorro	LINEAR	·	1.6 km	MPC · JPL
132098	2002 CC_{206}	—	February 10, 2002	Socorro	LINEAR	·	1.7 km	MPC · JPL
132099	2002 CS_{206}	—	February 10, 2002	Socorro	LINEAR	NYS	1.3 km	MPC · JPL
132100	2002 CU_{207}	—	February 10, 2002	Socorro	LINEAR	MAS	1.3 km	MPC · JPL

== 132101–132200 ==
back to top

Designation			Discovery			Properties		Ref
Permanent	Provisional	Named after	Date	Site	Discoverer(s)	Category	Diam.	Ref
132101	2002 CY_{208}	—	February 10, 2002	Socorro	LINEAR	·	1.9 km	MPC · JPL
132102	2002 CZ_{210}	—	February 10, 2002	Socorro	LINEAR	slow	2.6 km	MPC · JPL
132103	2002 CV_{211}	—	February 10, 2002	Socorro	LINEAR	·	1.4 km	MPC · JPL
132104	2002 CM_{212}	—	February 10, 2002	Socorro	LINEAR	·	2.0 km	MPC · JPL
132105	2002 CA_{213}	—	February 10, 2002	Socorro	LINEAR	·	1.2 km	MPC · JPL
132106	2002 CF_{213}	—	February 10, 2002	Socorro	LINEAR	·	1.7 km	MPC · JPL
132107	2002 CR_{214}	—	February 10, 2002	Socorro	LINEAR	·	2.1 km	MPC · JPL
132108	2002 CP_{215}	—	February 10, 2002	Socorro	LINEAR	·	1.4 km	MPC · JPL
132109	2002 CS_{217}	—	February 10, 2002	Socorro	LINEAR	·	1.7 km	MPC · JPL
132110	2002 CV_{217}	—	February 10, 2002	Socorro	LINEAR	·	1.8 km	MPC · JPL
132111	2002 CA_{219}	—	February 10, 2002	Socorro	LINEAR	·	2.1 km	MPC · JPL
132112	2002 CX_{219}	—	February 10, 2002	Socorro	LINEAR	MAS	1.6 km	MPC · JPL
132113	2002 CN_{223}	—	February 11, 2002	Socorro	LINEAR	·	2.1 km	MPC · JPL
132114	2002 CE_{224}	—	February 11, 2002	Socorro	LINEAR	NYS	2.0 km	MPC · JPL
132115	2002 CL_{225}	—	February 15, 2002	Bergisch Gladbach	W. Bickel	·	3.0 km	MPC · JPL
132116	2002 CR_{225}	—	February 4, 2002	Haleakala	NEAT	·	2.5 km	MPC · JPL
132117	2002 CT_{226}	—	February 5, 2002	Palomar	NEAT	·	1.4 km	MPC · JPL
132118	2002 CG_{228}	—	February 6, 2002	Palomar	NEAT	BAP	1.5 km	MPC · JPL
132119	2002 CY_{229}	—	February 10, 2002	Kitt Peak	Spacewatch	·	1.4 km	MPC · JPL
132120	2002 CL_{230}	—	February 12, 2002	Kitt Peak	Spacewatch	NYS	1.9 km	MPC · JPL
132121	2002 CW_{233}	—	February 11, 2002	Socorro	LINEAR	·	2.2 km	MPC · JPL
132122	2002 CZ_{233}	—	February 11, 2002	Socorro	LINEAR	V	1.4 km	MPC · JPL
132123	2002 CT_{237}	—	February 10, 2002	Socorro	LINEAR	·	2.9 km	MPC · JPL
132124	2002 CW_{237}	—	February 10, 2002	Socorro	LINEAR	·	4.2 km	MPC · JPL
132125	2002 CT_{239}	—	February 11, 2002	Socorro	LINEAR	·	2.0 km	MPC · JPL
132126	2002 CE_{240}	—	February 11, 2002	Socorro	LINEAR	NYS	2.2 km	MPC · JPL
132127	2002 CO_{241}	—	February 11, 2002	Socorro	LINEAR	V	1.4 km	MPC · JPL
132128	2002 CG_{242}	—	February 11, 2002	Socorro	LINEAR	NYS	1.9 km	MPC · JPL
132129	2002 CB_{243}	—	February 11, 2002	Socorro	LINEAR	·	1.6 km	MPC · JPL
132130	2002 CH_{245}	—	February 13, 2002	Socorro	LINEAR	·	3.4 km	MPC · JPL
132131	2002 CX_{246}	—	February 15, 2002	Kitt Peak	Spacewatch	NYS	1.7 km	MPC · JPL
132132	2002 CL_{247}	—	February 15, 2002	Socorro	LINEAR	NYS	1.7 km	MPC · JPL
132133	2002 CP_{247}	—	February 15, 2002	Socorro	LINEAR	·	2.0 km	MPC · JPL
132134	2002 CV_{248}	—	February 14, 2002	Haleakala	NEAT	·	1.6 km	MPC · JPL
132135	2002 CN_{249}	—	February 15, 2002	Socorro	LINEAR	·	2.0 km	MPC · JPL
132136	2002 CA_{252}	—	February 3, 2002	Palomar	NEAT	·	1.6 km	MPC · JPL
132137	2002 CZ_{255}	—	February 4, 2002	Palomar	NEAT	·	1.3 km	MPC · JPL
132138	2002 CA_{259}	—	February 6, 2002	Anderson Mesa	LONEOS	·	2.0 km	MPC · JPL
132139	2002 CH_{269}	—	February 7, 2002	Socorro	LINEAR	V	940 m	MPC · JPL
132140	2002 CT_{270}	—	February 7, 2002	Haleakala	NEAT	·	1.0 km	MPC · JPL
132141	2002 CJ_{272}	—	February 8, 2002	Anderson Mesa	LONEOS	·	1.4 km	MPC · JPL
132142	2002 CU_{272}	—	February 8, 2002	Anderson Mesa	LONEOS	·	1.7 km	MPC · JPL
132143	2002 CS_{277}	—	February 7, 2002	Palomar	NEAT	·	1.5 km	MPC · JPL
132144	2002 CM_{280}	—	February 7, 2002	Haleakala	NEAT	NYS	2.1 km	MPC · JPL
132145	2002 CU_{281}	—	February 8, 2002	Kitt Peak	Spacewatch	·	2.0 km	MPC · JPL
132146	2002 CJ_{283}	—	February 8, 2002	Kitt Peak	Spacewatch	·	2.4 km	MPC · JPL
132147	2002 CT_{284}	—	February 9, 2002	Kitt Peak	Spacewatch	·	2.2 km	MPC · JPL
132148	2002 CW_{284}	—	February 9, 2002	Kitt Peak	Spacewatch	·	3.4 km	MPC · JPL
132149	2002 CN_{287}	—	February 9, 2002	Kvistaberg	Uppsala-DLR Asteroid Survey	NYS	2.1 km	MPC · JPL
132150	2002 CB_{288}	—	February 9, 2002	Kitt Peak	Spacewatch	NYS	1.7 km	MPC · JPL
132151	2002 CV_{298}	—	February 11, 2002	Socorro	LINEAR	NYS	1.9 km	MPC · JPL
132152	2002 CY_{298}	—	February 11, 2002	Socorro	LINEAR	·	2.5 km	MPC · JPL
132153	2002 CJ_{307}	—	February 8, 2002	Socorro	LINEAR	·	1.6 km	MPC · JPL
132154	2002 CQ_{307}	—	February 8, 2002	Socorro	LINEAR	·	1.9 km	MPC · JPL
132155	2002 CO_{310}	—	February 7, 2002	Palomar	NEAT	·	2.5 km	MPC · JPL
132156	2002 CK_{311}	—	February 10, 2002	Socorro	LINEAR	NYS	1.8 km	MPC · JPL
132157	2002 DD_{7}	—	February 20, 2002	Kitt Peak	Spacewatch	NYS	2.5 km	MPC · JPL
132158	2002 DQ_{10}	—	February 20, 2002	Socorro	LINEAR	MAS	1.4 km	MPC · JPL
132159	2002 EP_{2}	—	March 8, 2002	Ondřejov	P. Pravec, P. Kušnirák	·	1.4 km	MPC · JPL
132160	2002 ES_{2}	—	March 8, 2002	Kleť	Kleť	·	1.5 km	MPC · JPL
132161	2002 EZ_{6}	—	March 6, 2002	Siding Spring	R. H. McNaught	·	1.8 km	MPC · JPL
132162	2002 EJ_{8}	—	March 7, 2002	Cima Ekar	ADAS	·	2.3 km	MPC · JPL
132163	2002 EM_{9}	—	March 14, 2002	Prescott	P. G. Comba	NYS	1.6 km	MPC · JPL
132164	2002 ED_{10}	—	March 14, 2002	Socorro	LINEAR	PHO	2.3 km	MPC · JPL
132165	2002 EM_{13}	—	March 3, 2002	Haleakala	NEAT	·	1.6 km	MPC · JPL
132166	2002 EO_{13}	—	March 3, 2002	Haleakala	NEAT	NYS	2.0 km	MPC · JPL
132167	2002 EH_{17}	—	March 5, 2002	Kitt Peak	Spacewatch	·	1.8 km	MPC · JPL
132168	2002 EC_{19}	—	March 6, 2002	Palomar	NEAT	·	2.1 km	MPC · JPL
132169	2002 EE_{20}	—	March 9, 2002	Socorro	LINEAR	NYS	2.8 km	MPC · JPL
132170	2002 EA_{21}	—	March 10, 2002	Haleakala	NEAT	·	2.2 km	MPC · JPL
132171	2002 EV_{21}	—	March 10, 2002	Haleakala	NEAT	·	2.1 km	MPC · JPL
132172	2002 EZ_{21}	—	March 10, 2002	Haleakala	NEAT	·	1.7 km	MPC · JPL
132173	2002 EU_{22}	—	March 10, 2002	Haleakala	NEAT	·	1.9 km	MPC · JPL
132174	2002 EX_{22}	—	March 10, 2002	Haleakala	NEAT	V	1.5 km	MPC · JPL
132175	2002 EA_{24}	—	March 5, 2002	Kitt Peak	Spacewatch	·	1.5 km	MPC · JPL
132176	2002 EK_{26}	—	March 10, 2002	Anderson Mesa	LONEOS	·	2.0 km	MPC · JPL
132177	2002 EN_{26}	—	March 10, 2002	Anderson Mesa	LONEOS	·	2.4 km	MPC · JPL
132178	2002 EC_{27}	—	March 9, 2002	Socorro	LINEAR	MAS	1.3 km	MPC · JPL
132179	2002 EL_{27}	—	March 9, 2002	Socorro	LINEAR	NYS	1.6 km	MPC · JPL
132180	2002 ET_{27}	—	March 9, 2002	Socorro	LINEAR	MAS	1.5 km	MPC · JPL
132181	2002 EV_{27}	—	March 9, 2002	Socorro	LINEAR	MAS	1.4 km	MPC · JPL
132182	2002 EZ_{27}	—	March 9, 2002	Socorro	LINEAR	·	1.6 km	MPC · JPL
132183	2002 EF_{28}	—	March 9, 2002	Socorro	LINEAR	NYS	2.1 km	MPC · JPL
132184	2002 EN_{28}	—	March 9, 2002	Socorro	LINEAR	·	1.6 km	MPC · JPL
132185	2002 ER_{28}	—	March 9, 2002	Socorro	LINEAR	·	2.1 km	MPC · JPL
132186	2002 EW_{29}	—	March 9, 2002	Socorro	LINEAR	·	2.1 km	MPC · JPL
132187	2002 EC_{30}	—	March 9, 2002	Socorro	LINEAR	MAS	1.8 km	MPC · JPL
132188	2002 EW_{30}	—	March 9, 2002	Socorro	LINEAR	·	1.4 km	MPC · JPL
132189	2002 EG_{31}	—	March 9, 2002	Socorro	LINEAR	V	1.2 km	MPC · JPL
132190	2002 EN_{34}	—	March 11, 2002	Palomar	NEAT	(5)	2.8 km	MPC · JPL
132191	2002 EF_{37}	—	March 9, 2002	Kitt Peak	Spacewatch	·	2.4 km	MPC · JPL
132192	2002 EQ_{39}	—	March 9, 2002	Socorro	LINEAR	·	1.7 km	MPC · JPL
132193	2002 EY_{39}	—	March 9, 2002	Socorro	LINEAR	·	1.9 km	MPC · JPL
132194	2002 EM_{41}	—	March 12, 2002	Socorro	LINEAR	·	3.0 km	MPC · JPL
132195	2002 EQ_{42}	—	March 12, 2002	Socorro	LINEAR	·	1.5 km	MPC · JPL
132196	2002 EU_{42}	—	March 12, 2002	Socorro	LINEAR	·	1.6 km	MPC · JPL
132197	2002 ES_{44}	—	March 10, 2002	Haleakala	NEAT	(2076)	1.1 km	MPC · JPL
132198	2002 EX_{44}	—	March 10, 2002	Haleakala	NEAT	MAS	970 m	MPC · JPL
132199	2002 EB_{45}	—	March 10, 2002	Haleakala	NEAT	·	1.8 km	MPC · JPL
132200	2002 EQ_{45}	—	March 11, 2002	Palomar	NEAT	·	1.2 km	MPC · JPL

== 132201–132300 ==
back to top

Designation			Discovery			Properties		Ref
Permanent	Provisional	Named after	Date	Site	Discoverer(s)	Category	Diam.	Ref
132201	2002 EO_{50}	—	March 12, 2002	Palomar	NEAT	·	2.4 km	MPC · JPL
132202	2002 EV_{51}	—	March 9, 2002	Socorro	LINEAR	·	2.0 km	MPC · JPL
132203	2002 EK_{52}	—	March 9, 2002	Socorro	LINEAR	·	1.8 km	MPC · JPL
132204	2002 EO_{53}	—	March 13, 2002	Socorro	LINEAR	·	2.2 km	MPC · JPL
132205	2002 EU_{53}	—	March 13, 2002	Socorro	LINEAR	·	2.3 km	MPC · JPL
132206	2002 EP_{56}	—	March 13, 2002	Socorro	LINEAR	·	1.4 km	MPC · JPL
132207	2002 EQ_{56}	—	March 13, 2002	Socorro	LINEAR	·	2.0 km	MPC · JPL
132208	2002 EG_{57}	—	March 13, 2002	Socorro	LINEAR	·	1.9 km	MPC · JPL
132209	2002 EN_{57}	—	March 13, 2002	Socorro	LINEAR	MAS	980 m	MPC · JPL
132210	2002 ED_{58}	—	March 13, 2002	Socorro	LINEAR	·	2.1 km	MPC · JPL
132211	2002 EM_{58}	—	March 13, 2002	Socorro	LINEAR	·	1.9 km	MPC · JPL
132212	2002 EH_{59}	—	March 13, 2002	Socorro	LINEAR	NYS	1.7 km	MPC · JPL
132213	2002 ES_{59}	—	March 13, 2002	Socorro	LINEAR	NYS	2.6 km	MPC · JPL
132214	2002 EC_{60}	—	March 13, 2002	Socorro	LINEAR	V	1.1 km	MPC · JPL
132215	2002 EL_{61}	—	March 13, 2002	Socorro	LINEAR	·	2.3 km	MPC · JPL
132216	2002 EU_{63}	—	March 13, 2002	Socorro	LINEAR	·	2.4 km	MPC · JPL
132217	2002 EQ_{64}	—	March 13, 2002	Socorro	LINEAR	·	2.8 km	MPC · JPL
132218	2002 EX_{64}	—	March 13, 2002	Socorro	LINEAR	·	1.7 km	MPC · JPL
132219	2002 EL_{65}	—	March 13, 2002	Socorro	LINEAR	·	1.4 km	MPC · JPL
132220	2002 EM_{66}	—	March 13, 2002	Socorro	LINEAR	MAS	1.2 km	MPC · JPL
132221	2002 ES_{67}	—	March 13, 2002	Socorro	LINEAR	V	1.2 km	MPC · JPL
132222	2002 EG_{68}	—	March 13, 2002	Socorro	LINEAR	MAS	1.3 km	MPC · JPL
132223	2002 ET_{69}	—	March 13, 2002	Socorro	LINEAR	NYS	2.5 km	MPC · JPL
132224	2002 EX_{69}	—	March 13, 2002	Socorro	LINEAR	·	2.2 km	MPC · JPL
132225	2002 EP_{70}	—	March 13, 2002	Socorro	LINEAR	MAS	1.5 km	MPC · JPL
132226	2002 EA_{71}	—	March 13, 2002	Socorro	LINEAR	NYS	1.8 km	MPC · JPL
132227	2002 EE_{71}	—	March 13, 2002	Socorro	LINEAR	NYS	2.1 km	MPC · JPL
132228	2002 EQ_{71}	—	March 13, 2002	Socorro	LINEAR	MAS	1.0 km	MPC · JPL
132229	2002 ET_{72}	—	March 13, 2002	Socorro	LINEAR	V	1.5 km	MPC · JPL
132230	2002 EU_{72}	—	March 13, 2002	Socorro	LINEAR	·	3.4 km	MPC · JPL
132231	2002 EN_{74}	—	March 13, 2002	Socorro	LINEAR	MAR	1.7 km	MPC · JPL
132232	2002 EP_{74}	—	March 13, 2002	Socorro	LINEAR	·	2.1 km	MPC · JPL
132233	2002 EV_{74}	—	March 13, 2002	Socorro	LINEAR	NYS	2.2 km	MPC · JPL
132234	2002 EU_{75}	—	March 14, 2002	Palomar	NEAT	·	2.0 km	MPC · JPL
132235	2002 EE_{79}	—	March 10, 2002	Haleakala	NEAT	·	2.1 km	MPC · JPL
132236	2002 EH_{79}	—	March 10, 2002	Haleakala	NEAT	V	1.2 km	MPC · JPL
132237	2002 EL_{79}	—	March 10, 2002	Haleakala	NEAT	·	1.7 km	MPC · JPL
132238	2002 EC_{80}	—	March 12, 2002	Palomar	NEAT	·	2.8 km	MPC · JPL
132239	2002 EF_{80}	—	March 12, 2002	Palomar	NEAT	NYS	1.6 km	MPC · JPL
132240	2002 EQ_{81}	—	March 13, 2002	Palomar	NEAT	·	1.9 km	MPC · JPL
132241	2002 EU_{84}	—	March 9, 2002	Socorro	LINEAR	MAS	1.1 km	MPC · JPL
132242	2002 EE_{85}	—	March 9, 2002	Socorro	LINEAR	·	1.8 km	MPC · JPL
132243	2002 EJ_{85}	—	March 9, 2002	Socorro	LINEAR	NYS	2.1 km	MPC · JPL
132244	2002 EB_{86}	—	March 9, 2002	Socorro	LINEAR	NYS	2.6 km	MPC · JPL
132245	2002 ED_{86}	—	March 9, 2002	Socorro	LINEAR	MAS	1.3 km	MPC · JPL
132246	2002 EQ_{86}	—	March 9, 2002	Socorro	LINEAR	·	2.2 km	MPC · JPL
132247	2002 EV_{87}	—	March 9, 2002	Socorro	LINEAR	MAS	1.2 km	MPC · JPL
132248	2002 EM_{90}	—	March 12, 2002	Socorro	LINEAR	CLA	3.7 km	MPC · JPL
132249	2002 EN_{92}	—	March 13, 2002	Socorro	LINEAR	·	2.4 km	MPC · JPL
132250	2002 ET_{93}	—	March 14, 2002	Socorro	LINEAR	MAS	1.4 km	MPC · JPL
132251	2002 EY_{94}	—	March 14, 2002	Socorro	LINEAR	NYS	2.3 km	MPC · JPL
132252	2002 EO_{97}	—	March 12, 2002	Socorro	LINEAR	·	2.2 km	MPC · JPL
132253	2002 EU_{100}	—	March 5, 2002	Haleakala	NEAT	·	2.3 km	MPC · JPL
132254	2002 EZ_{100}	—	March 6, 2002	Socorro	LINEAR	V	1.1 km	MPC · JPL
132255	2002 EC_{105}	—	March 9, 2002	Anderson Mesa	LONEOS	·	2.5 km	MPC · JPL
132256	2002 EV_{108}	—	March 9, 2002	Anderson Mesa	LONEOS	·	2.1 km	MPC · JPL
132257	2002 EW_{110}	—	March 9, 2002	Anderson Mesa	LONEOS	·	2.3 km	MPC · JPL
132258	2002 EM_{114}	—	March 10, 2002	Kitt Peak	Spacewatch	NYS	2.2 km	MPC · JPL
132259	2002 EY_{114}	—	March 10, 2002	Anderson Mesa	LONEOS	·	2.6 km	MPC · JPL
132260	2002 EM_{116}	—	March 9, 2002	Kitt Peak	Spacewatch	NYS	1.4 km	MPC · JPL
132261	2002 EJ_{118}	—	March 10, 2002	Kitt Peak	Spacewatch	·	2.2 km	MPC · JPL
132262	2002 EC_{123}	—	March 12, 2002	Palomar	NEAT	MAS	1.1 km	MPC · JPL
132263	2002 EX_{123}	—	March 12, 2002	Kitt Peak	Spacewatch	·	2.8 km	MPC · JPL
132264	2002 EO_{124}	—	March 12, 2002	Kitt Peak	Spacewatch	NYS	2.0 km	MPC · JPL
132265	2002 EW_{125}	—	March 11, 2002	Cima Ekar	ADAS	·	1.9 km	MPC · JPL
132266	2002 EV_{127}	—	March 12, 2002	Palomar	NEAT	·	2.2 km	MPC · JPL
132267	2002 EH_{131}	—	March 13, 2002	Socorro	LINEAR	NYS	2.0 km	MPC · JPL
132268	2002 EF_{133}	—	March 13, 2002	Socorro	LINEAR	MAS	1.1 km	MPC · JPL
132269	2002 EH_{135}	—	March 13, 2002	Palomar	NEAT	MAS	1.1 km	MPC · JPL
132270	2002 EN_{138}	—	March 12, 2002	Palomar	NEAT	MAS	1.3 km	MPC · JPL
132271	2002 ED_{141}	—	March 12, 2002	Palomar	NEAT	·	2.2 km	MPC · JPL
132272	2002 EN_{141}	—	March 12, 2002	Palomar	NEAT	MAS	1.5 km	MPC · JPL
132273	2002 EU_{141}	—	March 12, 2002	Palomar	NEAT	·	1.4 km	MPC · JPL
132274	2002 EB_{145}	—	March 13, 2002	Socorro	LINEAR	·	3.8 km	MPC · JPL
132275	2002 EN_{145}	—	March 13, 2002	Socorro	LINEAR	·	1.9 km	MPC · JPL
132276	2002 EA_{149}	—	March 15, 2002	Palomar	NEAT	MAS	1.2 km	MPC · JPL
132277	2002 EV_{150}	—	March 15, 2002	Palomar	NEAT	·	2.1 km	MPC · JPL
132278	2002 EP_{152}	—	March 14, 2002	Palomar	NEAT	·	2.6 km	MPC · JPL
132279	2002 EN_{155}	—	March 5, 2002	Anderson Mesa	LONEOS	·	1.7 km	MPC · JPL
132280	2002 FZ_{2}	—	March 16, 2002	Nogales	Tenagra II	NYS	2.4 km	MPC · JPL
132281	2002 FY_{9}	—	March 16, 2002	Socorro	LINEAR	·	2.0 km	MPC · JPL
132282	2002 FQ_{12}	—	March 16, 2002	Socorro	LINEAR	·	3.8 km	MPC · JPL
132283	2002 FP_{13}	—	March 16, 2002	Socorro	LINEAR	NYS	1.4 km	MPC · JPL
132284	2002 FX_{13}	—	March 16, 2002	Haleakala	NEAT	·	2.1 km	MPC · JPL
132285	2002 FP_{14}	—	March 16, 2002	Socorro	LINEAR	·	2.4 km	MPC · JPL
132286	2002 FW_{14}	—	March 16, 2002	Socorro	LINEAR	·	2.1 km	MPC · JPL
132287	2002 FA_{16}	—	March 16, 2002	Haleakala	NEAT	·	2.3 km	MPC · JPL
132288	2002 FJ_{20}	—	March 18, 2002	Haleakala	NEAT	·	2.4 km	MPC · JPL
132289	2002 FD_{22}	—	March 19, 2002	Socorro	LINEAR	V	1.3 km	MPC · JPL
132290	2002 FK_{22}	—	March 19, 2002	Socorro	LINEAR	·	4.4 km	MPC · JPL
132291	2002 FY_{24}	—	March 19, 2002	Anderson Mesa	LONEOS	·	1.8 km	MPC · JPL
132292	2002 FV_{32}	—	March 21, 2002	Palomar	NEAT	·	1.9 km	MPC · JPL
132293	2002 FS_{33}	—	March 20, 2002	Socorro	LINEAR	·	1.6 km	MPC · JPL
132294	2002 FF_{36}	—	March 21, 2002	Kitt Peak	Spacewatch	·	3.4 km	MPC · JPL
132295	2002 GC	—	April 1, 2002	Palomar	NEAT	MAR	2.3 km	MPC · JPL
132296	2002 GB_{1}	—	April 4, 2002	Emerald Lane	L. Ball	·	2.0 km	MPC · JPL
132297	2002 GD_{1}	—	April 3, 2002	Drebach	G. Lehmann, J. Kandler	·	1.7 km	MPC · JPL
132298	2002 GD_{2}	—	April 6, 2002	Emerald Lane	L. Ball	·	1.9 km	MPC · JPL
132299	2002 GK_{3}	—	April 4, 2002	Palomar	NEAT	HNS	1.7 km	MPC · JPL
132300	2002 GT_{6}	—	April 12, 2002	Socorro	LINEAR	·	4.7 km	MPC · JPL

== 132301–132400 ==
back to top

Designation			Discovery			Properties		Ref
Permanent	Provisional	Named after	Date	Site	Discoverer(s)	Category	Diam.	Ref
132301	2002 GG_{7}	—	April 14, 2002	Desert Eagle	W. K. Y. Yeung	·	2.1 km	MPC · JPL
132302	2002 GK_{7}	—	April 14, 2002	Desert Eagle	W. K. Y. Yeung	·	2.8 km	MPC · JPL
132303	2002 GW_{8}	—	April 14, 2002	Palomar	NEAT	·	2.9 km	MPC · JPL
132304	2002 GH_{9}	—	April 15, 2002	Desert Eagle	W. K. Y. Yeung	·	1.7 km	MPC · JPL
132305	2002 GG_{11}	—	April 14, 2002	Desert Eagle	W. K. Y. Yeung	·	3.8 km	MPC · JPL
132306	2002 GQ_{11}	—	April 14, 2002	Desert Eagle	W. K. Y. Yeung	·	2.7 km	MPC · JPL
132307	2002 GH_{12}	—	April 15, 2002	Desert Eagle	W. K. Y. Yeung	·	1.6 km	MPC · JPL
132308	2002 GT_{12}	—	April 14, 2002	Socorro	LINEAR	·	2.2 km	MPC · JPL
132309	2002 GV_{12}	—	April 14, 2002	Socorro	LINEAR	NYS	2.0 km	MPC · JPL
132310	2002 GP_{13}	—	April 14, 2002	Socorro	LINEAR	·	1.8 km	MPC · JPL
132311	2002 GY_{13}	—	April 14, 2002	Socorro	LINEAR	MAS	1.4 km	MPC · JPL
132312	2002 GT_{14}	—	April 15, 2002	Socorro	LINEAR	·	2.5 km	MPC · JPL
132313	2002 GL_{15}	—	April 15, 2002	Socorro	LINEAR	·	2.5 km	MPC · JPL
132314	2002 GH_{16}	—	April 15, 2002	Socorro	LINEAR	·	2.2 km	MPC · JPL
132315	2002 GU_{16}	—	April 15, 2002	Socorro	LINEAR	MAS	1.2 km	MPC · JPL
132316	2002 GZ_{17}	—	April 15, 2002	Socorro	LINEAR	·	2.1 km	MPC · JPL
132317	2002 GV_{18}	—	April 14, 2002	Socorro	LINEAR	·	2.2 km	MPC · JPL
132318	2002 GW_{18}	—	April 14, 2002	Socorro	LINEAR	·	1.8 km	MPC · JPL
132319	2002 GX_{18}	—	April 14, 2002	Socorro	LINEAR	NYS	2.4 km	MPC · JPL
132320	2002 GA_{19}	—	April 14, 2002	Socorro	LINEAR	·	2.1 km	MPC · JPL
132321	2002 GR_{19}	—	April 14, 2002	Socorro	LINEAR	·	2.2 km	MPC · JPL
132322	2002 GX_{19}	—	April 14, 2002	Socorro	LINEAR	·	1.8 km	MPC · JPL
132323	2002 GU_{21}	—	April 14, 2002	Socorro	LINEAR	·	1.9 km	MPC · JPL
132324	2002 GX_{21}	—	April 14, 2002	Socorro	LINEAR	·	3.5 km	MPC · JPL
132325	2002 GC_{23}	—	April 15, 2002	Palomar	NEAT	·	1.8 km	MPC · JPL
132326	2002 GR_{23}	—	April 15, 2002	Palomar	NEAT	·	1.4 km	MPC · JPL
132327	2002 GA_{24}	—	April 15, 2002	Palomar	NEAT	·	2.1 km	MPC · JPL
132328	2002 GH_{27}	—	April 11, 2002	Palomar	NEAT	PHO	3.3 km	MPC · JPL
132329 Tomandert	2002 GL_{31}	Tomandert	April 7, 2002	Cerro Tololo	M. W. Buie	·	4.1 km	MPC · JPL
132330	2002 GY_{33}	—	April 1, 2002	Palomar	NEAT	·	4.1 km	MPC · JPL
132331	2002 GD_{35}	—	April 1, 2002	Palomar	NEAT	·	2.8 km	MPC · JPL
132332	2002 GL_{37}	—	April 3, 2002	Kitt Peak	Spacewatch	NYS	2.0 km	MPC · JPL
132333	2002 GF_{38}	—	April 1, 2002	Palomar	NEAT	·	2.0 km	MPC · JPL
132334	2002 GN_{38}	—	April 2, 2002	Kitt Peak	Spacewatch	·	2.1 km	MPC · JPL
132335	2002 GU_{38}	—	April 2, 2002	Kitt Peak	Spacewatch	·	3.0 km	MPC · JPL
132336	2002 GM_{39}	—	April 4, 2002	Palomar	NEAT	·	1.5 km	MPC · JPL
132337	2002 GD_{40}	—	April 4, 2002	Palomar	NEAT	·	2.5 km	MPC · JPL
132338	2002 GP_{40}	—	April 4, 2002	Palomar	NEAT	·	2.0 km	MPC · JPL
132339	2002 GR_{41}	—	April 4, 2002	Palomar	NEAT	·	1.7 km	MPC · JPL
132340	2002 GD_{42}	—	April 4, 2002	Palomar	NEAT	·	4.0 km	MPC · JPL
132341	2002 GC_{43}	—	April 4, 2002	Haleakala	NEAT	·	3.6 km	MPC · JPL
132342	2002 GF_{43}	—	April 4, 2002	Palomar	NEAT	·	1.4 km	MPC · JPL
132343	2002 GQ_{43}	—	April 4, 2002	Palomar	NEAT	·	1.5 km	MPC · JPL
132344	2002 GA_{44}	—	April 4, 2002	Palomar	NEAT	·	2.2 km	MPC · JPL
132345	2002 GM_{44}	—	April 4, 2002	Haleakala	NEAT	·	2.2 km	MPC · JPL
132346	2002 GQ_{45}	—	April 4, 2002	Haleakala	NEAT	·	2.4 km	MPC · JPL
132347	2002 GD_{46}	—	April 2, 2002	Palomar	NEAT	·	2.7 km	MPC · JPL
132348	2002 GB_{47}	—	April 4, 2002	Palomar	NEAT	NYS	2.9 km	MPC · JPL
132349	2002 GF_{50}	—	April 5, 2002	Palomar	NEAT	·	2.9 km	MPC · JPL
132350	2002 GG_{52}	—	April 5, 2002	Anderson Mesa	LONEOS	·	2.1 km	MPC · JPL
132351	2002 GT_{52}	—	April 5, 2002	Anderson Mesa	LONEOS	(5)	1.7 km	MPC · JPL
132352	2002 GV_{54}	—	April 5, 2002	Kitt Peak	Spacewatch	PHO	3.4 km	MPC · JPL
132353	2002 GB_{55}	—	April 5, 2002	Anderson Mesa	LONEOS	MAS	1.4 km	MPC · JPL
132354	2002 GZ_{55}	—	April 5, 2002	Anderson Mesa	LONEOS	·	2.0 km	MPC · JPL
132355	2002 GH_{57}	—	April 8, 2002	Palomar	NEAT	·	2.6 km	MPC · JPL
132356	2002 GY_{58}	—	April 8, 2002	Palomar	NEAT	·	1.9 km	MPC · JPL
132357	2002 GM_{60}	—	April 8, 2002	Kitt Peak	Spacewatch	·	1.5 km	MPC · JPL
132358	2002 GE_{61}	—	April 8, 2002	Palomar	NEAT	·	3.6 km	MPC · JPL
132359	2002 GQ_{63}	—	April 8, 2002	Palomar	NEAT	EUN	1.8 km	MPC · JPL
132360	2002 GB_{64}	—	April 8, 2002	Palomar	NEAT	MIS	4.3 km	MPC · JPL
132361	2002 GK_{66}	—	April 8, 2002	Palomar	NEAT	·	1.9 km	MPC · JPL
132362	2002 GA_{67}	—	April 8, 2002	Palomar	NEAT	NYS	2.2 km	MPC · JPL
132363	2002 GL_{67}	—	April 8, 2002	Palomar	NEAT	·	3.8 km	MPC · JPL
132364	2002 GN_{67}	—	April 8, 2002	Palomar	NEAT	EUN	1.5 km	MPC · JPL
132365	2002 GO_{67}	—	April 8, 2002	Kitt Peak	Spacewatch	·	2.7 km	MPC · JPL
132366	2002 GF_{68}	—	April 8, 2002	Socorro	LINEAR	·	2.0 km	MPC · JPL
132367	2002 GG_{68}	—	April 8, 2002	Socorro	LINEAR	JUN	1.8 km	MPC · JPL
132368	2002 GT_{68}	—	April 8, 2002	Socorro	LINEAR	EUN	2.1 km	MPC · JPL
132369	2002 GX_{69}	—	April 8, 2002	Palomar	NEAT	·	4.8 km	MPC · JPL
132370	2002 GK_{72}	—	April 9, 2002	Anderson Mesa	LONEOS	AGN	2.2 km	MPC · JPL
132371	2002 GQ_{73}	—	April 9, 2002	Anderson Mesa	LONEOS	·	1.3 km	MPC · JPL
132372	2002 GW_{74}	—	April 9, 2002	Kitt Peak	Spacewatch	V	1.1 km	MPC · JPL
132373	2002 GK_{75}	—	April 9, 2002	Socorro	LINEAR	·	4.5 km	MPC · JPL
132374	2002 GM_{77}	—	April 9, 2002	Anderson Mesa	LONEOS	·	2.3 km	MPC · JPL
132375	2002 GA_{78}	—	April 9, 2002	Socorro	LINEAR	·	1.6 km	MPC · JPL
132376	2002 GF_{78}	—	April 9, 2002	Socorro	LINEAR	·	1.6 km	MPC · JPL
132377	2002 GJ_{79}	—	April 10, 2002	Socorro	LINEAR	NYS	1.5 km	MPC · JPL
132378	2002 GW_{79}	—	April 10, 2002	Socorro	LINEAR	·	3.7 km	MPC · JPL
132379	2002 GH_{80}	—	April 10, 2002	Socorro	LINEAR	·	2.7 km	MPC · JPL
132380	2002 GS_{80}	—	April 10, 2002	Socorro	LINEAR	·	1.2 km	MPC · JPL
132381	2002 GK_{82}	—	April 10, 2002	Socorro	LINEAR	·	2.4 km	MPC · JPL
132382	2002 GO_{83}	—	April 10, 2002	Socorro	LINEAR	·	2.4 km	MPC · JPL
132383	2002 GQ_{83}	—	April 10, 2002	Socorro	LINEAR	ERI	1.8 km	MPC · JPL
132384	2002 GT_{84}	—	April 10, 2002	Socorro	LINEAR	·	4.5 km	MPC · JPL
132385	2002 GY_{85}	—	April 10, 2002	Socorro	LINEAR	·	2.8 km	MPC · JPL
132386	2002 GT_{87}	—	April 10, 2002	Socorro	LINEAR	·	2.0 km	MPC · JPL
132387	2002 GK_{88}	—	April 10, 2002	Socorro	LINEAR	EUN	2.0 km	MPC · JPL
132388	2002 GQ_{88}	—	April 10, 2002	Socorro	LINEAR	·	2.1 km	MPC · JPL
132389	2002 GJ_{90}	—	April 8, 2002	Palomar	NEAT	·	2.0 km	MPC · JPL
132390	2002 GN_{91}	—	April 9, 2002	Anderson Mesa	LONEOS	·	1.5 km	MPC · JPL
132391	2002 GM_{92}	—	April 9, 2002	Palomar	NEAT	·	2.4 km	MPC · JPL
132392	2002 GP_{94}	—	April 9, 2002	Socorro	LINEAR	·	2.7 km	MPC · JPL
132393	2002 GW_{95}	—	April 9, 2002	Socorro	LINEAR	·	2.4 km	MPC · JPL
132394	2002 GW_{96}	—	April 9, 2002	Socorro	LINEAR	·	2.2 km	MPC · JPL
132395	2002 GA_{97}	—	April 9, 2002	Socorro	LINEAR	(5)	2.1 km	MPC · JPL
132396	2002 GW_{97}	—	April 10, 2002	Socorro	LINEAR	V	1.2 km	MPC · JPL
132397	2002 GO_{98}	—	April 10, 2002	Socorro	LINEAR	·	3.9 km	MPC · JPL
132398	2002 GN_{99}	—	April 10, 2002	Socorro	LINEAR	NYS	2.3 km	MPC · JPL
132399	2002 GW_{99}	—	April 10, 2002	Socorro	LINEAR	·	1.6 km	MPC · JPL
132400	2002 GS_{100}	—	April 10, 2002	Socorro	LINEAR	·	3.1 km	MPC · JPL

== 132401–132500 ==
back to top

Designation			Discovery			Properties		Ref
Permanent	Provisional	Named after	Date	Site	Discoverer(s)	Category	Diam.	Ref
132401	2002 GA_{101}	—	April 10, 2002	Socorro	LINEAR	NYS	2.1 km	MPC · JPL
132402	2002 GG_{101}	—	April 10, 2002	Socorro	LINEAR	·	1.9 km	MPC · JPL
132403	2002 GD_{102}	—	April 10, 2002	Socorro	LINEAR	MAR	2.2 km	MPC · JPL
132404	2002 GV_{107}	—	April 11, 2002	Socorro	LINEAR	·	3.4 km	MPC · JPL
132405	2002 GD_{108}	—	April 11, 2002	Socorro	LINEAR	·	1.9 km	MPC · JPL
132406	2002 GY_{108}	—	April 11, 2002	Palomar	NEAT	·	2.3 km	MPC · JPL
132407	2002 GA_{112}	—	April 10, 2002	Socorro	LINEAR	·	2.2 km	MPC · JPL
132408	2002 GS_{112}	—	April 10, 2002	Socorro	LINEAR	·	4.6 km	MPC · JPL
132409	2002 GJ_{113}	—	April 11, 2002	Socorro	LINEAR	·	2.2 km	MPC · JPL
132410	2002 GB_{114}	—	April 11, 2002	Socorro	LINEAR	·	3.2 km	MPC · JPL
132411	2002 GO_{117}	—	April 11, 2002	Socorro	LINEAR	·	2.3 km	MPC · JPL
132412	2002 GF_{121}	—	April 12, 2002	Kitt Peak	Spacewatch	·	3.6 km	MPC · JPL
132413	2002 GN_{122}	—	April 10, 2002	Socorro	LINEAR	NYS	1.5 km	MPC · JPL
132414	2002 GL_{125}	—	April 12, 2002	Socorro	LINEAR	·	2.2 km	MPC · JPL
132415	2002 GC_{127}	—	April 12, 2002	Palomar	NEAT	·	1.7 km	MPC · JPL
132416	2002 GJ_{130}	—	April 12, 2002	Socorro	LINEAR	·	3.0 km	MPC · JPL
132417	2002 GH_{132}	—	April 12, 2002	Socorro	LINEAR	·	2.4 km	MPC · JPL
132418	2002 GY_{132}	—	April 12, 2002	Socorro	LINEAR	·	3.0 km	MPC · JPL
132419	2002 GZ_{133}	—	April 12, 2002	Socorro	LINEAR	·	1.9 km	MPC · JPL
132420	2002 GQ_{135}	—	April 12, 2002	Socorro	LINEAR	(5)	1.5 km	MPC · JPL
132421	2002 GF_{140}	—	April 13, 2002	Kitt Peak	Spacewatch	MAS	1.2 km	MPC · JPL
132422	2002 GO_{144}	—	April 11, 2002	Palomar	NEAT	·	4.7 km	MPC · JPL
132423	2002 GN_{146}	—	April 13, 2002	Palomar	NEAT	·	1.3 km	MPC · JPL
132424	2002 GC_{147}	—	April 13, 2002	Palomar	NEAT	JUN	2.0 km	MPC · JPL
132425	2002 GJ_{147}	—	April 13, 2002	Palomar	NEAT	·	4.0 km	MPC · JPL
132426	2002 GR_{148}	—	April 14, 2002	Socorro	LINEAR	·	2.0 km	MPC · JPL
132427	2002 GY_{148}	—	April 14, 2002	Palomar	NEAT	·	1.5 km	MPC · JPL
132428	2002 GK_{151}	—	April 14, 2002	Palomar	NEAT	·	3.7 km	MPC · JPL
132429	2002 GH_{153}	—	April 12, 2002	Palomar	NEAT	·	3.2 km	MPC · JPL
132430	2002 GE_{154}	—	April 12, 2002	Haleakala	NEAT	·	1.7 km	MPC · JPL
132431	2002 GF_{160}	—	April 14, 2002	Palomar	NEAT	·	2.2 km	MPC · JPL
132432	2002 GG_{160}	—	April 15, 2002	Palomar	NEAT	EUN	1.4 km	MPC · JPL
132433	2002 GZ_{162}	—	April 14, 2002	Palomar	NEAT	·	2.3 km	MPC · JPL
132434	2002 GM_{163}	—	April 14, 2002	Kitt Peak	Spacewatch	MAS	1.3 km	MPC · JPL
132435	2002 GL_{164}	—	April 14, 2002	Palomar	NEAT	·	2.3 km	MPC · JPL
132436	2002 GW_{164}	—	April 14, 2002	Palomar	NEAT	·	2.6 km	MPC · JPL
132437	2002 GJ_{165}	—	April 14, 2002	Palomar	NEAT	·	2.0 km	MPC · JPL
132438	2002 GE_{169}	—	April 9, 2002	Socorro	LINEAR	·	1.8 km	MPC · JPL
132439	2002 GR_{170}	—	April 9, 2002	Socorro	LINEAR	·	3.3 km	MPC · JPL
132440	2002 GU_{173}	—	April 10, 2002	Socorro	LINEAR	·	2.0 km	MPC · JPL
132441	2002 GV_{174}	—	April 11, 2002	Socorro	LINEAR	V	1.2 km	MPC · JPL
132442	2002 GV_{176}	—	April 8, 2002	Palomar	NEAT	V	1.3 km	MPC · JPL
132443	2002 GQ_{177}	—	April 5, 2002	Palomar	White, M., M. Collins	·	5.3 km	MPC · JPL
132444	2002 GW_{177}	—	April 14, 2002	Haleakala	White, M., M. Collins	·	1.3 km	MPC · JPL
132445 Gaertner	2002 GD_{178}	Gaertner	April 14, 2002	Palomar	M. Meyer	·	1.5 km	MPC · JPL
132446	2002 HC_{1}	—	April 16, 2002	Socorro	LINEAR	·	3.0 km	MPC · JPL
132447	2002 HH_{1}	—	April 16, 2002	Socorro	LINEAR	MAR	2.4 km	MPC · JPL
132448	2002 HK_{1}	—	April 16, 2002	Socorro	LINEAR	·	2.5 km	MPC · JPL
132449	2002 HP_{1}	—	April 16, 2002	Socorro	LINEAR	·	2.6 km	MPC · JPL
132450	2002 HT_{1}	—	April 16, 2002	Socorro	LINEAR	·	2.1 km	MPC · JPL
132451	2002 HV_{1}	—	April 16, 2002	Socorro	LINEAR	·	1.9 km	MPC · JPL
132452	2002 HA_{2}	—	April 16, 2002	Socorro	LINEAR	·	2.3 km	MPC · JPL
132453	2002 HX_{2}	—	April 16, 2002	Socorro	LINEAR	·	2.1 km	MPC · JPL
132454	2002 HL_{4}	—	April 16, 2002	Socorro	LINEAR	·	2.6 km	MPC · JPL
132455	2002 HR_{5}	—	April 17, 2002	Socorro	LINEAR	·	3.8 km	MPC · JPL
132456	2002 HT_{5}	—	April 17, 2002	Socorro	LINEAR	·	1.9 km	MPC · JPL
132457	2002 HZ_{5}	—	April 18, 2002	Kitt Peak	Spacewatch	·	2.8 km	MPC · JPL
132458	2002 HJ_{6}	—	April 18, 2002	Haleakala	NEAT	·	2.5 km	MPC · JPL
132459	2002 HU_{6}	—	April 18, 2002	Palomar	NEAT	·	2.4 km	MPC · JPL
132460	2002 HG_{7}	—	April 18, 2002	Desert Eagle	W. K. Y. Yeung	EUN	1.8 km	MPC · JPL
132461	2002 HG_{12}	—	April 30, 2002	Palomar	NEAT	·	2.7 km	MPC · JPL
132462	2002 HT_{12}	—	April 22, 2002	Socorro	LINEAR	PHO	2.1 km	MPC · JPL
132463	2002 HV_{14}	—	April 17, 2002	Socorro	LINEAR	·	2.6 km	MPC · JPL
132464	2002 JM	—	May 3, 2002	Desert Eagle	W. K. Y. Yeung	EUN	2.1 km	MPC · JPL
132465	2002 JO	—	May 3, 2002	Desert Eagle	W. K. Y. Yeung	·	5.1 km	MPC · JPL
132466	2002 JY	—	May 3, 2002	Desert Eagle	W. K. Y. Yeung	·	1.7 km	MPC · JPL
132467	2002 JW_{1}	—	May 4, 2002	Desert Eagle	W. K. Y. Yeung	·	2.6 km	MPC · JPL
132468	2002 JD_{2}	—	May 3, 2002	Palomar	NEAT	NYS	2.1 km	MPC · JPL
132469	2002 JY_{4}	—	May 5, 2002	Desert Eagle	W. K. Y. Yeung	·	3.4 km	MPC · JPL
132470	2002 JJ_{8}	—	May 6, 2002	Palomar	NEAT	·	1.8 km	MPC · JPL
132471	2002 JL_{11}	—	May 4, 2002	Anderson Mesa	LONEOS	·	1.8 km	MPC · JPL
132472	2002 JV_{11}	—	May 6, 2002	Anderson Mesa	LONEOS	·	2.2 km	MPC · JPL
132473	2002 JN_{12}	—	May 5, 2002	Desert Eagle	W. K. Y. Yeung	·	1.4 km	MPC · JPL
132474	2002 JU_{12}	—	May 8, 2002	Desert Eagle	W. K. Y. Yeung	·	2.4 km	MPC · JPL
132475	2002 JK_{14}	—	May 7, 2002	Socorro	LINEAR	·	2.7 km	MPC · JPL
132476	2002 JF_{15}	—	May 8, 2002	Socorro	LINEAR	·	2.6 km	MPC · JPL
132477	2002 JC_{16}	—	May 1, 2002	Palomar	NEAT	EUN	2.3 km	MPC · JPL
132478	2002 JU_{17}	—	May 7, 2002	Palomar	NEAT	·	1.8 km	MPC · JPL
132479	2002 JX_{18}	—	May 7, 2002	Palomar	NEAT	·	3.3 km	MPC · JPL
132480	2002 JT_{20}	—	May 7, 2002	Palomar	NEAT	·	2.1 km	MPC · JPL
132481	2002 JK_{22}	—	May 8, 2002	Socorro	LINEAR	EUN	3.1 km	MPC · JPL
132482	2002 JQ_{23}	—	May 8, 2002	Socorro	LINEAR	·	1.7 km	MPC · JPL
132483	2002 JS_{24}	—	May 8, 2002	Socorro	LINEAR	·	2.3 km	MPC · JPL
132484	2002 JY_{24}	—	May 8, 2002	Socorro	LINEAR	·	1.9 km	MPC · JPL
132485	2002 JJ_{25}	—	May 8, 2002	Socorro	LINEAR	PHO	1.8 km	MPC · JPL
132486	2002 JR_{26}	—	May 8, 2002	Socorro	LINEAR	·	2.0 km	MPC · JPL
132487	2002 JW_{26}	—	May 8, 2002	Socorro	LINEAR	·	2.1 km	MPC · JPL
132488	2002 JW_{27}	—	May 9, 2002	Socorro	LINEAR	·	1.6 km	MPC · JPL
132489	2002 JJ_{28}	—	May 9, 2002	Socorro	LINEAR	·	1.5 km	MPC · JPL
132490	2002 JB_{29}	—	May 9, 2002	Socorro	LINEAR	JUN	2.1 km	MPC · JPL
132491	2002 JG_{29}	—	May 9, 2002	Socorro	LINEAR	·	3.3 km	MPC · JPL
132492	2002 JO_{30}	—	May 9, 2002	Socorro	LINEAR	·	2.7 km	MPC · JPL
132493	2002 JP_{30}	—	May 9, 2002	Socorro	LINEAR	·	1.7 km	MPC · JPL
132494	2002 JQ_{30}	—	May 9, 2002	Socorro	LINEAR	·	1.5 km	MPC · JPL
132495	2002 JD_{31}	—	May 9, 2002	Socorro	LINEAR	·	2.0 km	MPC · JPL
132496	2002 JP_{31}	—	May 9, 2002	Socorro	LINEAR	·	2.0 km	MPC · JPL
132497	2002 JD_{32}	—	May 9, 2002	Socorro	LINEAR	(5)	1.9 km	MPC · JPL
132498	2002 JD_{33}	—	May 9, 2002	Socorro	LINEAR	·	3.8 km	MPC · JPL
132499	2002 JO_{34}	—	May 9, 2002	Socorro	LINEAR	·	3.3 km	MPC · JPL
132500	2002 JS_{34}	—	May 9, 2002	Socorro	LINEAR	·	2.5 km	MPC · JPL

== 132501–132600 ==
back to top

Designation			Discovery			Properties		Ref
Permanent	Provisional	Named after	Date	Site	Discoverer(s)	Category	Diam.	Ref
132501	2002 JG_{35}	—	May 9, 2002	Socorro	LINEAR	·	3.2 km	MPC · JPL
132502	2002 JQ_{35}	—	May 9, 2002	Socorro	LINEAR	·	1.6 km	MPC · JPL
132503	2002 JS_{35}	—	May 9, 2002	Socorro	LINEAR	·	1.8 km	MPC · JPL
132504	2002 JV_{35}	—	May 9, 2002	Socorro	LINEAR	·	2.3 km	MPC · JPL
132505	2002 JY_{35}	—	May 9, 2002	Socorro	LINEAR	·	2.6 km	MPC · JPL
132506	2002 JF_{37}	—	May 9, 2002	Anderson Mesa	LONEOS	JUN	2.2 km	MPC · JPL
132507	2002 JB_{38}	—	May 8, 2002	Haleakala	NEAT	GEF	2.4 km	MPC · JPL
132508	2002 JM_{38}	—	May 9, 2002	Palomar	NEAT	·	4.9 km	MPC · JPL
132509	2002 JU_{41}	—	May 8, 2002	Socorro	LINEAR	·	3.4 km	MPC · JPL
132510	2002 JB_{42}	—	May 8, 2002	Socorro	LINEAR	·	2.7 km	MPC · JPL
132511	2002 JK_{42}	—	May 8, 2002	Socorro	LINEAR	·	2.7 km	MPC · JPL
132512	2002 JJ_{43}	—	May 9, 2002	Socorro	LINEAR	·	1.6 km	MPC · JPL
132513	2002 JD_{45}	—	May 9, 2002	Socorro	LINEAR	·	2.1 km	MPC · JPL
132514	2002 JM_{47}	—	May 9, 2002	Socorro	LINEAR	(18466)	4.7 km	MPC · JPL
132515	2002 JT_{48}	—	May 9, 2002	Socorro	LINEAR	fast	2.3 km	MPC · JPL
132516	2002 JV_{48}	—	May 9, 2002	Socorro	LINEAR	·	1.6 km	MPC · JPL
132517	2002 JD_{49}	—	May 9, 2002	Socorro	LINEAR	·	2.6 km	MPC · JPL
132518	2002 JY_{49}	—	May 9, 2002	Socorro	LINEAR	EUN	2.6 km	MPC · JPL
132519	2002 JH_{50}	—	May 9, 2002	Socorro	LINEAR	·	2.0 km	MPC · JPL
132520	2002 JQ_{51}	—	May 9, 2002	Socorro	LINEAR	·	3.9 km	MPC · JPL
132521	2002 JP_{54}	—	May 9, 2002	Socorro	LINEAR	MAR	2.0 km	MPC · JPL
132522	2002 JT_{54}	—	May 9, 2002	Socorro	LINEAR	·	4.7 km	MPC · JPL
132523	2002 JF_{55}	—	May 9, 2002	Socorro	LINEAR	·	2.0 km	MPC · JPL
132524 APL	2002 JF_{56}	APL	May 9, 2002	Socorro	LINEAR	·	3.1 km	MPC · JPL
132525	2002 JV_{57}	—	May 9, 2002	Socorro	LINEAR	·	1.6 km	MPC · JPL
132526	2002 JO_{58}	—	May 9, 2002	Socorro	LINEAR	·	2.3 km	MPC · JPL
132527	2002 JB_{60}	—	May 9, 2002	Socorro	LINEAR	·	1.4 km	MPC · JPL
132528	2002 JO_{61}	—	May 8, 2002	Socorro	LINEAR	·	2.1 km	MPC · JPL
132529	2002 JJ_{62}	—	May 8, 2002	Socorro	LINEAR	EUN	2.4 km	MPC · JPL
132530	2002 JK_{62}	—	May 8, 2002	Socorro	LINEAR	·	2.5 km	MPC · JPL
132531	2002 JP_{62}	—	May 8, 2002	Socorro	LINEAR	EUN	2.4 km	MPC · JPL
132532	2002 JU_{62}	—	May 8, 2002	Socorro	LINEAR	(18466)	5.1 km	MPC · JPL
132533	2002 JA_{66}	—	May 9, 2002	Socorro	LINEAR	·	2.1 km	MPC · JPL
132534	2002 JS_{66}	—	May 10, 2002	Socorro	LINEAR	·	2.2 km	MPC · JPL
132535	2002 JC_{67}	—	May 10, 2002	Socorro	LINEAR	·	5.1 km	MPC · JPL
132536	2002 JG_{67}	—	May 10, 2002	Socorro	LINEAR	·	1.6 km	MPC · JPL
132537	2002 JE_{71}	—	May 8, 2002	Socorro	LINEAR	·	3.5 km	MPC · JPL
132538	2002 JQ_{71}	—	May 8, 2002	Socorro	LINEAR	·	1.5 km	MPC · JPL
132539	2002 JF_{72}	—	May 8, 2002	Socorro	LINEAR	·	2.7 km	MPC · JPL
132540	2002 JY_{72}	—	May 8, 2002	Socorro	LINEAR	·	4.2 km	MPC · JPL
132541	2002 JE_{73}	—	May 8, 2002	Socorro	LINEAR	·	2.1 km	MPC · JPL
132542	2002 JK_{73}	—	May 8, 2002	Socorro	LINEAR	·	2.3 km	MPC · JPL
132543	2002 JO_{73}	—	May 8, 2002	Socorro	LINEAR	·	2.5 km	MPC · JPL
132544	2002 JU_{73}	—	May 8, 2002	Socorro	LINEAR	·	2.2 km	MPC · JPL
132545	2002 JW_{73}	—	May 8, 2002	Socorro	LINEAR	RAF	2.2 km	MPC · JPL
132546	2002 JA_{74}	—	May 8, 2002	Socorro	LINEAR	EUN	4.1 km	MPC · JPL
132547	2002 JB_{74}	—	May 8, 2002	Socorro	LINEAR	·	4.0 km	MPC · JPL
132548	2002 JN_{74}	—	May 9, 2002	Socorro	LINEAR	V	1.0 km	MPC · JPL
132549	2002 JW_{75}	—	May 11, 2002	Socorro	LINEAR	·	2.2 km	MPC · JPL
132550	2002 JX_{75}	—	May 11, 2002	Socorro	LINEAR	·	3.0 km	MPC · JPL
132551	2002 JY_{75}	—	May 11, 2002	Socorro	LINEAR	·	2.5 km	MPC · JPL
132552	2002 JK_{76}	—	May 11, 2002	Socorro	LINEAR	·	1.8 km	MPC · JPL
132553	2002 JE_{77}	—	May 11, 2002	Socorro	LINEAR	RAF	2.0 km	MPC · JPL
132554	2002 JT_{82}	—	May 11, 2002	Socorro	LINEAR	·	1.8 km	MPC · JPL
132555	2002 JB_{85}	—	May 11, 2002	Socorro	LINEAR	·	1.9 km	MPC · JPL
132556	2002 JS_{85}	—	May 11, 2002	Socorro	LINEAR	(2076)	1.5 km	MPC · JPL
132557	2002 JD_{86}	—	May 11, 2002	Socorro	LINEAR	·	1.9 km	MPC · JPL
132558	2002 JN_{88}	—	May 11, 2002	Socorro	LINEAR	·	1.4 km	MPC · JPL
132559	2002 JP_{92}	—	May 11, 2002	Socorro	LINEAR	·	3.1 km	MPC · JPL
132560	2002 JH_{93}	—	May 11, 2002	Socorro	LINEAR	·	1.9 km	MPC · JPL
132561	2002 JV_{93}	—	May 11, 2002	Socorro	LINEAR	·	2.6 km	MPC · JPL
132562	2002 JA_{95}	—	May 11, 2002	Socorro	LINEAR	·	2.7 km	MPC · JPL
132563	2002 JE_{95}	—	May 11, 2002	Socorro	LINEAR	·	1.7 km	MPC · JPL
132564	2002 JB_{96}	—	May 11, 2002	Socorro	LINEAR	·	1.6 km	MPC · JPL
132565	2002 JK_{99}	—	May 13, 2002	Palomar	NEAT	·	4.0 km	MPC · JPL
132566	2002 JZ_{99}	—	May 8, 2002	Socorro	LINEAR	PHO	2.0 km	MPC · JPL
132567	2002 JP_{101}	—	May 9, 2002	Socorro	LINEAR	·	6.0 km	MPC · JPL
132568	2002 JS_{102}	—	May 9, 2002	Socorro	LINEAR	·	1.5 km	MPC · JPL
132569	2002 JU_{102}	—	May 9, 2002	Socorro	LINEAR	·	4.5 km	MPC · JPL
132570	2002 JH_{103}	—	May 10, 2002	Socorro	LINEAR	·	1.7 km	MPC · JPL
132571	2002 JM_{103}	—	May 10, 2002	Socorro	LINEAR	EUN	5.5 km	MPC · JPL
132572	2002 JX_{105}	—	May 13, 2002	Socorro	LINEAR	V	1.1 km	MPC · JPL
132573	2002 JV_{108}	—	May 6, 2002	Socorro	LINEAR	·	6.8 km	MPC · JPL
132574	2002 JO_{109}	—	May 11, 2002	Socorro	LINEAR	·	2.7 km	MPC · JPL
132575	2002 JU_{109}	—	May 11, 2002	Socorro	LINEAR	·	2.5 km	MPC · JPL
132576	2002 JJ_{111}	—	May 11, 2002	Socorro	LINEAR	·	5.8 km	MPC · JPL
132577	2002 JQ_{114}	—	May 13, 2002	Socorro	LINEAR	·	3.9 km	MPC · JPL
132578	2002 JR_{115}	—	May 15, 2002	Haleakala	NEAT	·	2.2 km	MPC · JPL
132579	2002 JX_{116}	—	May 4, 2002	Palomar	NEAT	·	2.3 km	MPC · JPL
132580	2002 JR_{117}	—	May 4, 2002	Anderson Mesa	LONEOS	·	2.1 km	MPC · JPL
132581	2002 JS_{117}	—	May 4, 2002	Anderson Mesa	LONEOS	·	2.3 km	MPC · JPL
132582	2002 JZ_{117}	—	May 4, 2002	Anderson Mesa	LONEOS	EUN	2.5 km	MPC · JPL
132583	2002 JH_{119}	—	May 5, 2002	Anderson Mesa	LONEOS	EUN	1.6 km	MPC · JPL
132584	2002 JF_{120}	—	May 5, 2002	Palomar	NEAT	·	3.9 km	MPC · JPL
132585	2002 JG_{120}	—	May 5, 2002	Palomar	NEAT	·	4.8 km	MPC · JPL
132586	2002 JX_{121}	—	May 5, 2002	Palomar	NEAT	EUN	2.9 km	MPC · JPL
132587	2002 JA_{128}	—	May 7, 2002	Palomar	NEAT	·	2.5 km	MPC · JPL
132588	2002 JC_{128}	—	May 7, 2002	Palomar	NEAT	·	1.7 km	MPC · JPL
132589	2002 JS_{128}	—	May 7, 2002	Palomar	NEAT	·	2.3 km	MPC · JPL
132590	2002 JJ_{130}	—	May 8, 2002	Socorro	LINEAR	EOS	3.9 km	MPC · JPL
132591	2002 JS_{131}	—	May 9, 2002	Palomar	NEAT	·	2.3 km	MPC · JPL
132592	2002 JW_{131}	—	May 9, 2002	Palomar	NEAT	·	2.3 km	MPC · JPL
132593	2002 JX_{132}	—	May 9, 2002	Socorro	LINEAR	·	1.9 km	MPC · JPL
132594	2002 JH_{134}	—	May 9, 2002	Palomar	NEAT	·	2.3 km	MPC · JPL
132595	2002 JJ_{134}	—	May 9, 2002	Palomar	NEAT	·	1.7 km	MPC · JPL
132596	2002 JJ_{135}	—	May 9, 2002	Kitt Peak	Spacewatch	·	2.5 km	MPC · JPL
132597	2002 JM_{141}	—	May 10, 2002	Palomar	NEAT	EUN	2.3 km	MPC · JPL
132598	2002 JG_{142}	—	May 11, 2002	Socorro	LINEAR	·	4.7 km	MPC · JPL
132599	2002 JX_{143}	—	May 13, 2002	Socorro	LINEAR	·	2.2 km	MPC · JPL
132600	2002 JB_{145}	—	May 13, 2002	Palomar	NEAT	·	3.6 km	MPC · JPL

== 132601–132700 ==
back to top

Designation			Discovery			Properties		Ref
Permanent	Provisional	Named after	Date	Site	Discoverer(s)	Category	Diam.	Ref
132601	2002 JH_{145}	—	May 13, 2002	Palomar	NEAT	EUN	2.0 km	MPC · JPL
132602	2002 KB_{5}	—	May 16, 2002	Socorro	LINEAR	·	4.4 km	MPC · JPL
132603	2002 KK_{6}	—	May 25, 2002	Palomar	NEAT	JUN	3.0 km	MPC · JPL
132604	2002 KS_{8}	—	May 30, 2002	Palomar	NEAT	·	6.1 km	MPC · JPL
132605	2002 KA_{9}	—	May 29, 2002	Haleakala	NEAT	·	5.5 km	MPC · JPL
132606	2002 KL_{9}	—	May 29, 2002	Palomar	NEAT	·	2.3 km	MPC · JPL
132607	2002 KT_{9}	—	May 16, 2002	Socorro	LINEAR	·	1.6 km	MPC · JPL
132608	2002 KV_{10}	—	May 16, 2002	Socorro	LINEAR	V	1.1 km	MPC · JPL
132609	2002 KU_{12}	—	May 17, 2002	Kitt Peak	Spacewatch	ADE	4.3 km	MPC · JPL
132610	2002 KC_{13}	—	May 18, 2002	Palomar	NEAT	·	3.7 km	MPC · JPL
132611	2002 KE_{14}	—	May 30, 2002	Palomar	NEAT	·	1.9 km	MPC · JPL
132612	2002 KM_{14}	—	May 30, 2002	Palomar	NEAT	·	2.1 km	MPC · JPL
132613	2002 KQ_{14}	—	May 30, 2002	Palomar	NEAT	·	2.3 km	MPC · JPL
132614	2002 KN_{15}	—	May 23, 2002	Palomar	NEAT	NYS	2.0 km	MPC · JPL
132615	2002 LM_{1}	—	June 2, 2002	Palomar	NEAT	·	1.9 km	MPC · JPL
132616	2002 LO_{3}	—	June 5, 2002	Socorro	LINEAR	·	4.7 km	MPC · JPL
132617	2002 LF_{4}	—	June 5, 2002	Socorro	LINEAR	·	3.3 km	MPC · JPL
132618	2002 LH_{6}	—	June 7, 2002	Palomar	NEAT	·	1.9 km	MPC · JPL
132619	2002 LR_{6}	—	June 1, 2002	Palomar	NEAT	·	3.9 km	MPC · JPL
132620	2002 LL_{7}	—	June 2, 2002	Palomar	NEAT	(5)	2.5 km	MPC · JPL
132621	2002 LS_{8}	—	June 5, 2002	Socorro	LINEAR	·	3.1 km	MPC · JPL
132622	2002 LE_{9}	—	June 5, 2002	Socorro	LINEAR	·	1.7 km	MPC · JPL
132623	2002 LV_{9}	—	June 5, 2002	Socorro	LINEAR	·	3.0 km	MPC · JPL
132624	2002 LD_{13}	—	June 5, 2002	Socorro	LINEAR	·	5.8 km	MPC · JPL
132625	2002 LJ_{20}	—	June 6, 2002	Socorro	LINEAR	·	2.2 km	MPC · JPL
132626	2002 LY_{20}	—	June 6, 2002	Socorro	LINEAR	·	6.9 km	MPC · JPL
132627	2002 LH_{21}	—	June 6, 2002	Socorro	LINEAR	EUN	2.8 km	MPC · JPL
132628	2002 LJ_{21}	—	June 6, 2002	Socorro	LINEAR	·	5.9 km	MPC · JPL
132629	2002 LU_{22}	—	June 8, 2002	Socorro	LINEAR	·	2.5 km	MPC · JPL
132630	2002 LH_{24}	—	June 9, 2002	Desert Eagle	W. K. Y. Yeung	EUN	4.8 km	MPC · JPL
132631	2002 LW_{27}	—	June 9, 2002	Socorro	LINEAR	·	3.3 km	MPC · JPL
132632	2002 LU_{29}	—	June 9, 2002	Haleakala	NEAT	·	3.0 km	MPC · JPL
132633	2002 LL_{30}	—	June 1, 2002	Palomar	NEAT	·	2.3 km	MPC · JPL
132634	2002 LQ_{30}	—	June 3, 2002	Palomar	NEAT	·	4.3 km	MPC · JPL
132635	2002 LG_{32}	—	June 10, 2002	Socorro	LINEAR	·	2.4 km	MPC · JPL
132636	2002 LC_{33}	—	June 3, 2002	Socorro	LINEAR	·	2.3 km	MPC · JPL
132637	2002 LW_{34}	—	June 9, 2002	Socorro	LINEAR	·	1.9 km	MPC · JPL
132638	2002 LZ_{34}	—	June 9, 2002	Palomar	NEAT	·	5.7 km	MPC · JPL
132639	2002 LB_{35}	—	June 11, 2002	Palomar	NEAT	·	4.9 km	MPC · JPL
132640	2002 LW_{36}	—	June 9, 2002	Socorro	LINEAR	·	2.9 km	MPC · JPL
132641	2002 LY_{37}	—	June 12, 2002	Socorro	LINEAR	·	3.4 km	MPC · JPL
132642	2002 LF_{38}	—	June 5, 2002	Palomar	NEAT	(5)	3.0 km	MPC · JPL
132643	2002 LN_{40}	—	June 10, 2002	Socorro	LINEAR	DOR	5.3 km	MPC · JPL
132644	2002 LJ_{45}	—	June 5, 2002	Palomar	NEAT	·	2.2 km	MPC · JPL
132645	2002 LK_{45}	—	June 5, 2002	Palomar	NEAT	·	2.0 km	MPC · JPL
132646	2002 LT_{45}	—	June 6, 2002	Haleakala	NEAT	·	4.1 km	MPC · JPL
132647	2002 LY_{48}	—	June 13, 2002	Palomar	NEAT	·	3.1 km	MPC · JPL
132648	2002 LF_{51}	—	June 9, 2002	Socorro	LINEAR	·	3.7 km	MPC · JPL
132649	2002 LH_{51}	—	June 9, 2002	Socorro	LINEAR	·	2.8 km	MPC · JPL
132650	2002 LL_{51}	—	June 9, 2002	Socorro	LINEAR	·	3.6 km	MPC · JPL
132651	2002 LD_{52}	—	June 9, 2002	Socorro	LINEAR	·	3.2 km	MPC · JPL
132652	2002 LX_{53}	—	June 10, 2002	Socorro	LINEAR	·	4.8 km	MPC · JPL
132653	2002 LY_{53}	—	June 10, 2002	Socorro	LINEAR	HNS	2.6 km	MPC · JPL
132654	2002 LD_{54}	—	June 10, 2002	Socorro	LINEAR	·	3.7 km	MPC · JPL
132655	2002 LF_{54}	—	June 10, 2002	Socorro	LINEAR	·	7.3 km	MPC · JPL
132656	2002 LP_{54}	—	June 8, 2002	Palomar	NEAT	·	6.2 km	MPC · JPL
132657	2002 LZ_{54}	—	June 10, 2002	Socorro	LINEAR	·	5.9 km	MPC · JPL
132658	2002 LA_{56}	—	June 14, 2002	Socorro	LINEAR	·	3.7 km	MPC · JPL
132659	2002 LH_{57}	—	June 11, 2002	Socorro	LINEAR	·	2.1 km	MPC · JPL
132660	2002 LY_{57}	—	June 12, 2002	Socorro	LINEAR	EUN	2.1 km	MPC · JPL
132661 Carlbaeker	2002 LO_{60}	Carlbaeker	June 12, 2002	Palomar	M. Meyer	·	1.7 km	MPC · JPL
132662	2002 LQ_{60}	—	June 8, 2002	Palomar	S. F. Hönig	THM	5.5 km	MPC · JPL
132663	2002 MD_{2}	—	June 16, 2002	Palomar	NEAT	HYG	5.3 km	MPC · JPL
132664	2002 MB_{3}	—	June 25, 2002	Palomar	NEAT	·	4.1 km	MPC · JPL
132665	2002 MC_{5}	—	June 16, 2002	Palomar	NEAT	·	2.0 km	MPC · JPL
132666	2002 NU_{1}	—	July 3, 2002	Palomar	NEAT	·	1.5 km	MPC · JPL
132667	2002 NL_{4}	—	July 3, 2002	Palomar	NEAT	PHO	2.6 km	MPC · JPL
132668 Brunobozzetto	2002 NA_{6}	Brunobozzetto	July 10, 2002	Campo Imperatore	CINEOS	KOR	1.9 km	MPC · JPL
132669	2002 NJ_{6}	—	July 11, 2002	Campo Imperatore	CINEOS	·	3.9 km	MPC · JPL
132670	2002 NT_{8}	—	July 1, 2002	Palomar	NEAT	·	2.3 km	MPC · JPL
132671	2002 NL_{9}	—	July 3, 2002	Palomar	NEAT	PHO	1.7 km	MPC · JPL
132672	2002 NP_{9}	—	July 3, 2002	Palomar	NEAT	MRX	2.2 km	MPC · JPL
132673	2002 NO_{12}	—	July 4, 2002	Palomar	NEAT	GEF	2.3 km	MPC · JPL
132674	2002 NB_{14}	—	July 4, 2002	Palomar	NEAT	·	5.4 km	MPC · JPL
132675	2002 NG_{14}	—	July 4, 2002	Palomar	NEAT	·	3.2 km	MPC · JPL
132676	2002 NR_{14}	—	July 5, 2002	Socorro	LINEAR	MIS	3.7 km	MPC · JPL
132677	2002 ND_{15}	—	July 5, 2002	Socorro	LINEAR	·	3.4 km	MPC · JPL
132678	2002 NW_{15}	—	July 5, 2002	Socorro	LINEAR	·	4.2 km	MPC · JPL
132679	2002 NF_{16}	—	July 6, 2002	Desert Eagle	W. K. Y. Yeung	EUN	2.2 km	MPC · JPL
132680	2002 NE_{18}	—	July 9, 2002	Socorro	LINEAR	·	5.1 km	MPC · JPL
132681	2002 NG_{19}	—	July 9, 2002	Socorro	LINEAR	EUN	2.7 km	MPC · JPL
132682	2002 NW_{19}	—	July 9, 2002	Socorro	LINEAR	·	4.4 km	MPC · JPL
132683	2002 NZ_{21}	—	July 9, 2002	Socorro	LINEAR	·	1.9 km	MPC · JPL
132684	2002 NQ_{22}	—	July 9, 2002	Socorro	LINEAR	MAR	1.6 km	MPC · JPL
132685	2002 NV_{23}	—	July 9, 2002	Socorro	LINEAR	EOS	4.5 km	MPC · JPL
132686	2002 ND_{25}	—	July 9, 2002	Socorro	LINEAR	·	4.1 km	MPC · JPL
132687	2002 NJ_{25}	—	July 9, 2002	Socorro	LINEAR	·	4.3 km	MPC · JPL
132688	2002 NF_{27}	—	July 9, 2002	Socorro	LINEAR	·	4.7 km	MPC · JPL
132689	2002 NC_{28}	—	July 13, 2002	Socorro	LINEAR	·	4.6 km	MPC · JPL
132690	2002 NQ_{28}	—	July 12, 2002	Palomar	NEAT	·	2.2 km	MPC · JPL
132691	2002 NY_{32}	—	July 13, 2002	Socorro	LINEAR	·	2.4 km	MPC · JPL
132692	2002 NJ_{33}	—	July 13, 2002	Socorro	LINEAR	EUN	2.6 km	MPC · JPL
132693	2002 NQ_{33}	—	July 14, 2002	Socorro	LINEAR	·	2.4 km	MPC · JPL
132694	2002 NH_{34}	—	July 11, 2002	Bergisch Gladbach	W. Bickel	·	6.5 km	MPC · JPL
132695	2002 NV_{34}	—	July 9, 2002	Socorro	LINEAR	fast	3.0 km	MPC · JPL
132696	2002 NW_{34}	—	July 9, 2002	Socorro	LINEAR	·	3.7 km	MPC · JPL
132697	2002 NU_{37}	—	July 9, 2002	Socorro	LINEAR	·	3.6 km	MPC · JPL
132698	2002 NJ_{38}	—	July 9, 2002	Socorro	LINEAR	EOS	4.1 km	MPC · JPL
132699	2002 NY_{43}	—	July 12, 2002	Palomar	NEAT	·	3.6 km	MPC · JPL
132700	2002 NX_{48}	—	July 14, 2002	Socorro	LINEAR	EOS	3.3 km	MPC · JPL

== 132701–132800 ==
back to top

Designation			Discovery			Properties		Ref
Permanent	Provisional	Named after	Date	Site	Discoverer(s)	Category	Diam.	Ref
132701	2002 NQ_{50}	—	July 14, 2002	Socorro	LINEAR	·	3.1 km	MPC · JPL
132702	2002 OU_{2}	—	July 17, 2002	Socorro	LINEAR	·	3.1 km	MPC · JPL
132703	2002 OE_{3}	—	July 17, 2002	Socorro	LINEAR	·	3.3 km	MPC · JPL
132704	2002 ON_{3}	—	July 17, 2002	Socorro	LINEAR	·	9.2 km	MPC · JPL
132705	2002 OL_{6}	—	July 20, 2002	Palomar	NEAT	·	5.6 km	MPC · JPL
132706	2002 OZ_{10}	—	July 22, 2002	Palomar	NEAT	·	2.5 km	MPC · JPL
132707	2002 OR_{11}	—	July 18, 2002	Socorro	LINEAR	·	5.5 km	MPC · JPL
132708	2002 OT_{13}	—	July 18, 2002	Socorro	LINEAR	·	6.1 km	MPC · JPL
132709	2002 OV_{13}	—	July 18, 2002	Socorro	LINEAR	·	3.2 km	MPC · JPL
132710	2002 OJ_{14}	—	July 18, 2002	Socorro	LINEAR	·	5.9 km	MPC · JPL
132711	2002 OS_{14}	—	July 18, 2002	Socorro	LINEAR	·	6.2 km	MPC · JPL
132712	2002 OY_{14}	—	July 18, 2002	Socorro	LINEAR	·	4.7 km	MPC · JPL
132713	2002 OK_{16}	—	July 18, 2002	Socorro	LINEAR	·	4.1 km	MPC · JPL
132714	2002 OC_{17}	—	July 18, 2002	Socorro	LINEAR	·	7.6 km	MPC · JPL
132715	2002 OR_{18}	—	July 18, 2002	Socorro	LINEAR	EOS	5.2 km	MPC · JPL
132716	2002 OJ_{19}	—	July 18, 2002	Socorro	LINEAR	·	5.3 km	MPC · JPL
132717	2002 OT_{24}	—	July 22, 2002	Palomar	S. F. Hönig	·	4.2 km	MPC · JPL
132718 Kemény	2002 ON_{27}	Kemény	July 23, 2002	Palomar	K. Sárneczky	KOR	2.3 km	MPC · JPL
132719 Lambey	2002 PF	Lambey	August 1, 2002	Pises	J.-M. Lopez, J. H. Blanc	(5)	2.1 km	MPC · JPL
132720	2002 PK_{1}	—	August 4, 2002	Socorro	LINEAR	·	2.6 km	MPC · JPL
132721	2002 PS_{3}	—	August 3, 2002	Palomar	NEAT	·	2.4 km	MPC · JPL
132722	2002 PV_{3}	—	August 3, 2002	Palomar	NEAT	EOS	3.1 km	MPC · JPL
132723	2002 PU_{4}	—	August 4, 2002	Palomar	NEAT	·	3.5 km	MPC · JPL
132724	2002 PL_{5}	—	August 4, 2002	Palomar	NEAT	·	3.5 km	MPC · JPL
132725	2002 PO_{10}	—	August 5, 2002	Palomar	NEAT	·	7.3 km	MPC · JPL
132726	2002 PU_{14}	—	August 6, 2002	Palomar	NEAT	·	2.3 km	MPC · JPL
132727	2002 PD_{16}	—	August 6, 2002	Palomar	NEAT	EOS	3.6 km	MPC · JPL
132728	2002 PF_{18}	—	August 6, 2002	Palomar	NEAT	·	2.9 km	MPC · JPL
132729	2002 PO_{22}	—	August 6, 2002	Palomar	NEAT	EOS	2.8 km	MPC · JPL
132730	2002 PE_{23}	—	August 6, 2002	Palomar	NEAT	·	2.8 km	MPC · JPL
132731	2002 PL_{24}	—	August 6, 2002	Palomar	NEAT	·	4.4 km	MPC · JPL
132732	2002 PM_{25}	—	August 6, 2002	Palomar	NEAT	·	4.3 km	MPC · JPL
132733	2002 PH_{26}	—	August 6, 2002	Palomar	NEAT	·	4.6 km	MPC · JPL
132734	2002 PG_{27}	—	August 6, 2002	Palomar	NEAT	·	3.5 km	MPC · JPL
132735	2002 PZ_{27}	—	August 6, 2002	Palomar	NEAT	KOR	2.0 km	MPC · JPL
132736	2002 PQ_{28}	—	August 6, 2002	Palomar	NEAT	VER	6.1 km	MPC · JPL
132737	2002 PS_{28}	—	August 6, 2002	Palomar	NEAT	·	4.9 km	MPC · JPL
132738	2002 PH_{29}	—	August 6, 2002	Palomar	NEAT	MRX	1.6 km	MPC · JPL
132739	2002 PJ_{30}	—	August 6, 2002	Palomar	NEAT	·	6.1 km	MPC · JPL
132740	2002 PF_{32}	—	August 6, 2002	Palomar	NEAT	·	3.5 km	MPC · JPL
132741 Liliacapocaccia	2002 PU_{33}	Liliacapocaccia	August 6, 2002	Campo Imperatore	M. Tombelli, F. Bernardi	·	5.3 km	MPC · JPL
132742	2002 PU_{36}	—	August 7, 2002	Palomar	NEAT	·	2.3 km	MPC · JPL
132743	2002 PO_{37}	—	August 5, 2002	Socorro	LINEAR	·	2.6 km	MPC · JPL
132744	2002 PT_{40}	—	August 4, 2002	Socorro	LINEAR	·	2.9 km	MPC · JPL
132745	2002 PV_{40}	—	August 4, 2002	Socorro	LINEAR	·	2.8 km	MPC · JPL
132746	2002 PG_{42}	—	August 5, 2002	Socorro	LINEAR	·	4.0 km	MPC · JPL
132747	2002 PQ_{43}	—	August 11, 2002	Needville	J. Dellinger, W. G. Dillon	·	1.5 km	MPC · JPL
132748	2002 PB_{45}	—	August 5, 2002	Socorro	LINEAR	CYB	4.5 km	MPC · JPL
132749	2002 PE_{47}	—	August 10, 2002	Socorro	LINEAR	·	4.8 km	MPC · JPL
132750	2002 PM_{48}	—	August 10, 2002	Socorro	LINEAR	VER	8.2 km	MPC · JPL
132751	2002 PS_{48}	—	August 10, 2002	Socorro	LINEAR	EOS	4.1 km	MPC · JPL
132752	2002 PK_{49}	—	August 10, 2002	Socorro	LINEAR	VER	5.8 km	MPC · JPL
132753	2002 PT_{51}	—	August 8, 2002	Palomar	NEAT	·	3.9 km	MPC · JPL
132754	2002 PR_{54}	—	August 5, 2002	Socorro	LINEAR	·	8.4 km	MPC · JPL
132755	2002 PU_{59}	—	August 10, 2002	Socorro	LINEAR	HYG	5.1 km	MPC · JPL
132756	2002 PV_{62}	—	August 8, 2002	Palomar	NEAT	·	4.0 km	MPC · JPL
132757	2002 PB_{65}	—	August 5, 2002	Palomar	NEAT	EOS	3.4 km	MPC · JPL
132758	2002 PH_{69}	—	August 11, 2002	Socorro	LINEAR	·	5.6 km	MPC · JPL
132759	2002 PM_{69}	—	August 11, 2002	Socorro	LINEAR	·	5.3 km	MPC · JPL
132760	2002 PB_{70}	—	August 11, 2002	Socorro	LINEAR	·	2.8 km	MPC · JPL
132761	2002 PH_{71}	—	August 12, 2002	Socorro	LINEAR	EUN	2.8 km	MPC · JPL
132762	2002 PU_{72}	—	August 12, 2002	Socorro	LINEAR	·	7.1 km	MPC · JPL
132763	2002 PW_{73}	—	August 12, 2002	Socorro	LINEAR	·	7.4 km	MPC · JPL
132764	2002 PH_{76}	—	August 9, 2002	Haleakala	NEAT	·	7.0 km	MPC · JPL
132765	2002 PA_{81}	—	August 13, 2002	Palomar	NEAT	·	4.2 km	MPC · JPL
132766	2002 PN_{84}	—	August 10, 2002	Socorro	LINEAR	·	3.0 km	MPC · JPL
132767	2002 PO_{84}	—	August 10, 2002	Socorro	LINEAR	·	3.3 km	MPC · JPL
132768	2002 PQ_{90}	—	August 12, 2002	Anderson Mesa	LONEOS	·	4.3 km	MPC · JPL
132769	2002 PJ_{91}	—	August 13, 2002	Socorro	LINEAR	EUN	2.6 km	MPC · JPL
132770	2002 PN_{93}	—	August 14, 2002	Palomar	NEAT	URS	10 km	MPC · JPL
132771	2002 PF_{95}	—	August 13, 2002	Palomar	NEAT	·	4.1 km	MPC · JPL
132772	2002 PO_{95}	—	August 14, 2002	Socorro	LINEAR	·	2.2 km	MPC · JPL
132773	2002 PT_{95}	—	August 14, 2002	Socorro	LINEAR	AGN	2.4 km	MPC · JPL
132774	2002 PP_{97}	—	August 14, 2002	Socorro	LINEAR	·	5.8 km	MPC · JPL
132775	2002 PA_{99}	—	August 14, 2002	Socorro	LINEAR	·	4.8 km	MPC · JPL
132776	2002 PN_{101}	—	August 12, 2002	Socorro	LINEAR	EOS	4.0 km	MPC · JPL
132777	2002 PL_{107}	—	August 13, 2002	Palomar	NEAT	·	6.2 km	MPC · JPL
132778	2002 PU_{108}	—	August 13, 2002	Socorro	LINEAR	EOS	3.9 km	MPC · JPL
132779	2002 PW_{110}	—	August 13, 2002	Socorro	LINEAR	·	3.8 km	MPC · JPL
132780	2002 PZ_{110}	—	August 13, 2002	Anderson Mesa	LONEOS	·	7.4 km	MPC · JPL
132781	2002 PQ_{115}	—	August 13, 2002	Anderson Mesa	LONEOS	(18466)	5.0 km	MPC · JPL
132782	2002 PB_{117}	—	August 14, 2002	Anderson Mesa	LONEOS	·	5.1 km	MPC · JPL
132783	2002 PW_{123}	—	August 13, 2002	Anderson Mesa	LONEOS	·	1.8 km	MPC · JPL
132784	2002 PS_{125}	—	August 14, 2002	Socorro	LINEAR	·	1.9 km	MPC · JPL
132785	2002 PH_{127}	—	August 14, 2002	Socorro	LINEAR	·	9.0 km	MPC · JPL
132786	2002 PB_{132}	—	August 13, 2002	Socorro	LINEAR	·	4.6 km	MPC · JPL
132787	2002 PE_{135}	—	August 14, 2002	Socorro	LINEAR	·	6.0 km	MPC · JPL
132788	2002 PJ_{135}	—	August 14, 2002	Socorro	LINEAR	·	7.5 km	MPC · JPL
132789	2002 PH_{136}	—	August 14, 2002	Socorro	LINEAR	·	3.3 km	MPC · JPL
132790	2002 PW_{140}	—	August 14, 2002	Siding Spring	R. H. McNaught	·	2.9 km	MPC · JPL
132791 Jeremybauman	2002 PY_{149}	Jeremybauman	August 11, 2002	Cerro Tololo	M. W. Buie	·	5.6 km	MPC · JPL
132792 Scottsmith	2002 PB_{152}	Scottsmith	August 10, 2002	Cerro Tololo	Millis, R.	·	3.5 km	MPC · JPL
132793	2002 PJ_{155}	—	August 8, 2002	Palomar	S. F. Hönig	·	3.8 km	MPC · JPL
132794	2002 PS_{155}	—	August 8, 2002	Palomar	S. F. Hönig	·	5.3 km	MPC · JPL
132795	2002 PU_{161}	—	August 8, 2002	Palomar	S. F. Hönig	·	2.4 km	MPC · JPL
132796	2002 PR_{162}	—	August 8, 2002	Palomar	S. F. Hönig	·	4.4 km	MPC · JPL
132797	2002 PW_{166}	—	August 15, 2002	Palomar	NEAT	·	2.9 km	MPC · JPL
132798 Kürti	2002 PU_{167}	Kürti	August 8, 2002	Palomar	NEAT	·	1.6 km	MPC · JPL
132799	2002 PG_{171}	—	August 11, 2002	Palomar	NEAT	KOR	2.1 km	MPC · JPL
132800	2002 QM	—	August 16, 2002	Anderson Mesa	LONEOS	·	9.7 km	MPC · JPL

== 132801–132900 ==
back to top

Designation			Discovery			Properties		Ref
Permanent	Provisional	Named after	Date	Site	Discoverer(s)	Category	Diam.	Ref
132801	2002 QJ_{1}	—	August 16, 2002	Haleakala	NEAT	·	5.3 km	MPC · JPL
132802	2002 QV_{1}	—	August 16, 2002	Haleakala	NEAT	EOS	4.9 km	MPC · JPL
132803	2002 QP_{7}	—	August 16, 2002	Palomar	NEAT	·	4.5 km	MPC · JPL
132804	2002 QP_{8}	—	August 19, 2002	Palomar	NEAT	EOS	4.6 km	MPC · JPL
132805	2002 QQ_{8}	—	August 19, 2002	Palomar	NEAT	·	5.3 km	MPC · JPL
132806	2002 QF_{9}	—	August 19, 2002	Palomar	NEAT	·	4.0 km	MPC · JPL
132807	2002 QV_{28}	—	August 29, 2002	Palomar	NEAT	·	2.3 km	MPC · JPL
132808	2002 QN_{30}	—	August 29, 2002	Palomar	NEAT	THM	3.8 km	MPC · JPL
132809	2002 QO_{30}	—	August 29, 2002	Palomar	NEAT	KOR	2.8 km	MPC · JPL
132810	2002 QW_{31}	—	August 29, 2002	Palomar	NEAT	·	4.6 km	MPC · JPL
132811	2002 QG_{32}	—	August 29, 2002	Palomar	NEAT	·	3.2 km	MPC · JPL
132812	2002 QX_{34}	—	August 29, 2002	Palomar	NEAT	·	4.5 km	MPC · JPL
132813	2002 QY_{34}	—	August 29, 2002	Palomar	NEAT	DOR	4.2 km	MPC · JPL
132814	2002 QE_{40}	—	August 30, 2002	Palomar	NEAT	·	3.7 km	MPC · JPL
132815	2002 QX_{46}	—	August 30, 2002	Socorro	LINEAR	·	2.7 km	MPC · JPL
132816	2002 QL_{49}	—	August 29, 2002	Palomar	S. F. Hönig	·	3.4 km	MPC · JPL
132817	2002 QE_{51}	—	August 28, 2002	Palomar	R. Matson	·	5.9 km	MPC · JPL
132818	2002 QK_{60}	—	August 26, 2002	Palomar	NEAT	·	4.7 km	MPC · JPL
132819	2002 QN_{64}	—	August 18, 2002	Palomar	NEAT	THM	2.6 km	MPC · JPL
132820 Miskotte	2002 QX_{65}	Miskotte	August 17, 2002	Palomar	NEAT	·	3.3 km	MPC · JPL
132821	2002 QR_{68}	—	August 18, 2002	Palomar	NEAT	·	5.0 km	MPC · JPL
132822	2002 QN_{69}	—	August 18, 2002	Palomar	NEAT	KOR	2.2 km	MPC · JPL
132823	2002 QW_{74}	—	August 30, 2002	Palomar	NEAT	·	2.4 km	MPC · JPL
132824 Galamb	2002 QE_{79}	Galamb	August 17, 2002	Palomar	K. Sárneczky	KOR	1.8 km	MPC · JPL
132825 Shizu-Mao	2002 QT_{85}	Shizu-Mao	August 16, 2002	Nanchuan	Q. Ye	EOS	6.4 km	MPC · JPL
132826	2002 QR_{87}	—	August 27, 2002	Palomar	NEAT	KOR	1.9 km	MPC · JPL
132827	2002 RK_{1}	—	September 1, 2002	Haleakala	NEAT	RAF	1.8 km	MPC · JPL
132828	2002 RA_{2}	—	September 4, 2002	Anderson Mesa	LONEOS	·	6.8 km	MPC · JPL
132829	2002 RG_{4}	—	September 3, 2002	Palomar	NEAT	·	7.4 km	MPC · JPL
132830	2002 RQ_{7}	—	September 3, 2002	Haleakala	NEAT	KOR	2.8 km	MPC · JPL
132831	2002 RO_{10}	—	September 4, 2002	Palomar	NEAT	DOR	3.9 km	MPC · JPL
132832	2002 RX_{12}	—	September 4, 2002	Anderson Mesa	LONEOS	HYG	6.8 km	MPC · JPL
132833	2002 RM_{14}	—	September 4, 2002	Anderson Mesa	LONEOS	·	4.0 km	MPC · JPL
132834	2002 RG_{17}	—	September 4, 2002	Anderson Mesa	LONEOS	EOS	4.1 km	MPC · JPL
132835	2002 RJ_{17}	—	September 4, 2002	Anderson Mesa	LONEOS	·	4.3 km	MPC · JPL
132836	2002 RY_{20}	—	September 4, 2002	Anderson Mesa	LONEOS	THM	5.9 km	MPC · JPL
132837	2002 RH_{26}	—	September 4, 2002	Anderson Mesa	LONEOS	·	2.9 km	MPC · JPL
132838	2002 RT_{27}	—	September 3, 2002	Needville	J. Dellinger	EOS	2.5 km	MPC · JPL
132839	2002 RN_{30}	—	September 4, 2002	Anderson Mesa	LONEOS	·	5.3 km	MPC · JPL
132840	2002 RV_{31}	—	September 4, 2002	Anderson Mesa	LONEOS	·	3.0 km	MPC · JPL
132841	2002 RV_{33}	—	September 4, 2002	Anderson Mesa	LONEOS	·	5.7 km	MPC · JPL
132842	2002 RZ_{33}	—	September 4, 2002	Anderson Mesa	LONEOS	·	3.7 km	MPC · JPL
132843	2002 RG_{37}	—	September 5, 2002	Socorro	LINEAR	URS	5.9 km	MPC · JPL
132844	2002 RW_{39}	—	September 5, 2002	Socorro	LINEAR	·	3.1 km	MPC · JPL
132845	2002 RY_{40}	—	September 5, 2002	Socorro	LINEAR	THM	3.9 km	MPC · JPL
132846	2002 RD_{41}	—	September 5, 2002	Socorro	LINEAR	·	4.8 km	MPC · JPL
132847	2002 RS_{46}	—	September 5, 2002	Socorro	LINEAR	KOR	2.9 km	MPC · JPL
132848	2002 RK_{47}	—	September 5, 2002	Socorro	LINEAR	·	4.8 km	MPC · JPL
132849	2002 RZ_{49}	—	September 5, 2002	Socorro	LINEAR	VER	5.8 km	MPC · JPL
132850	2002 RL_{51}	—	September 5, 2002	Socorro	LINEAR	·	4.5 km	MPC · JPL
132851	2002 RS_{51}	—	September 5, 2002	Socorro	LINEAR	·	6.0 km	MPC · JPL
132852	2002 RN_{53}	—	September 5, 2002	Socorro	LINEAR	KOR	2.4 km	MPC · JPL
132853	2002 RJ_{55}	—	September 5, 2002	Anderson Mesa	LONEOS	·	5.1 km	MPC · JPL
132854	2002 RZ_{55}	—	September 5, 2002	Anderson Mesa	LONEOS	·	3.0 km	MPC · JPL
132855	2002 RE_{60}	—	September 5, 2002	Anderson Mesa	LONEOS	·	2.8 km	MPC · JPL
132856	2002 RK_{61}	—	September 5, 2002	Socorro	LINEAR	·	5.0 km	MPC · JPL
132857	2002 RE_{67}	—	September 3, 2002	Palomar	NEAT	EOS	3.3 km	MPC · JPL
132858	2002 RC_{69}	—	September 4, 2002	Anderson Mesa	LONEOS	HYG	5.0 km	MPC · JPL
132859	2002 RE_{70}	—	September 4, 2002	Palomar	NEAT	·	4.5 km	MPC · JPL
132860	2002 RJ_{70}	—	September 4, 2002	Palomar	NEAT	·	6.8 km	MPC · JPL
132861	2002 RO_{74}	—	September 5, 2002	Socorro	LINEAR	VER	6.2 km	MPC · JPL
132862	2002 RN_{78}	—	September 5, 2002	Socorro	LINEAR	·	3.9 km	MPC · JPL
132863	2002 RM_{79}	—	September 5, 2002	Socorro	LINEAR	·	3.7 km	MPC · JPL
132864	2002 RN_{82}	—	September 5, 2002	Socorro	LINEAR	·	4.1 km	MPC · JPL
132865	2002 RA_{83}	—	September 5, 2002	Socorro	LINEAR	·	6.7 km	MPC · JPL
132866	2002 RW_{84}	—	September 5, 2002	Socorro	LINEAR	HYG	5.9 km	MPC · JPL
132867	2002 RB_{94}	—	September 5, 2002	Socorro	LINEAR	·	4.2 km	MPC · JPL
132868	2002 RO_{95}	—	September 5, 2002	Socorro	LINEAR	3:2 · SHU	8.9 km	MPC · JPL
132869	2002 RX_{98}	—	September 5, 2002	Socorro	LINEAR	·	5.6 km	MPC · JPL
132870	2002 RJ_{101}	—	September 5, 2002	Socorro	LINEAR	·	8.1 km	MPC · JPL
132871	2002 RW_{105}	—	September 5, 2002	Socorro	LINEAR	DOR	5.3 km	MPC · JPL
132872	2002 RU_{109}	—	September 6, 2002	Socorro	LINEAR	·	3.9 km	MPC · JPL
132873	2002 RB_{114}	—	September 5, 2002	Anderson Mesa	LONEOS	·	8.2 km	MPC · JPL
132874 Latinovits	2002 RV_{118}	Latinovits	September 9, 2002	Piszkéstető	K. Sárneczky	H	710 m	MPC · JPL
132875	2002 RS_{120}	—	September 7, 2002	Socorro	LINEAR	·	7.6 km	MPC · JPL
132876	2002 RA_{121}	—	September 7, 2002	Socorro	LINEAR	·	6.7 km	MPC · JPL
132877	2002 RT_{124}	—	September 9, 2002	Palomar	NEAT	EOS	4.1 km	MPC · JPL
132878	2002 RD_{125}	—	September 7, 2002	Socorro	LINEAR	·	6.0 km	MPC · JPL
132879	2002 RQ_{128}	—	September 10, 2002	Palomar	NEAT	·	3.8 km	MPC · JPL
132880	2002 RU_{132}	—	September 9, 2002	Haleakala	NEAT	·	5.0 km	MPC · JPL
132881	2002 RS_{133}	—	September 10, 2002	Palomar	NEAT	(43176)	5.9 km	MPC · JPL
132882	2002 RL_{135}	—	September 10, 2002	Haleakala	NEAT	·	4.8 km	MPC · JPL
132883	2002 RN_{138}	—	September 10, 2002	Palomar	NEAT	·	5.1 km	MPC · JPL
132884	2002 RJ_{148}	—	September 11, 2002	Palomar	NEAT	·	4.8 km	MPC · JPL
132885	2002 RK_{149}	—	September 11, 2002	Haleakala	NEAT	EOS	4.4 km	MPC · JPL
132886	2002 RM_{149}	—	September 11, 2002	Haleakala	NEAT	·	5.6 km	MPC · JPL
132887	2002 RU_{155}	—	September 11, 2002	Palomar	NEAT	·	5.0 km	MPC · JPL
132888	2002 RT_{156}	—	September 11, 2002	Palomar	NEAT	URS	5.3 km	MPC · JPL
132889	2002 RV_{164}	—	September 12, 2002	Palomar	NEAT	HYG	4.5 km	MPC · JPL
132890	2002 RM_{169}	—	September 13, 2002	Palomar	NEAT	EOS	2.7 km	MPC · JPL
132891	2002 RY_{173}	—	September 13, 2002	Palomar	NEAT	PAD	3.4 km	MPC · JPL
132892	2002 RH_{175}	—	September 13, 2002	Palomar	NEAT	·	4.9 km	MPC · JPL
132893	2002 RY_{184}	—	September 12, 2002	Palomar	NEAT	EOS	4.8 km	MPC · JPL
132894	2002 RJ_{186}	—	September 12, 2002	Palomar	NEAT	·	5.7 km	MPC · JPL
132895	2002 RH_{188}	—	September 13, 2002	Palomar	NEAT	EOS	4.0 km	MPC · JPL
132896	2002 RM_{188}	—	September 13, 2002	Palomar	NEAT	·	3.8 km	MPC · JPL
132897	2002 RF_{189}	—	September 13, 2002	Palomar	NEAT	·	3.9 km	MPC · JPL
132898	2002 RN_{204}	—	September 14, 2002	Palomar	NEAT	·	4.4 km	MPC · JPL
132899	2002 RO_{212}	—	September 15, 2002	Haleakala	NEAT	slow	5.9 km	MPC · JPL
132900	2002 RN_{215}	—	September 13, 2002	Socorro	LINEAR	·	6.4 km	MPC · JPL

== 132901–133000 ==
back to top

Designation			Discovery			Properties		Ref
Permanent	Provisional	Named after	Date	Site	Discoverer(s)	Category	Diam.	Ref
132901	2002 RF_{230}	—	September 15, 2002	Palomar	NEAT	·	5.1 km	MPC · JPL
132902	2002 RO_{233}	—	September 8, 2002	Haleakala	R. Matson	·	5.9 km	MPC · JPL
132903 Edgibson	2002 RG_{234}	Edgibson	September 14, 2002	Palomar	R. Matson	THM	3.6 km	MPC · JPL
132904 Notkin	2002 RB_{237}	Notkin	September 12, 2002	Palomar	R. Matson	3:2	7.2 km	MPC · JPL
132905	2002 RS_{237}	—	September 15, 2002	Palomar	R. Matson	EOS	3.2 km	MPC · JPL
132906	2002 RO_{247}	—	September 9, 2002	Palomar	NEAT	·	3.6 km	MPC · JPL
132907	2002 RC_{248}	—	September 15, 2002	Palomar	NEAT	·	5.3 km	MPC · JPL
132908	2002 SW_{13}	—	September 27, 2002	Palomar	NEAT	·	2.9 km	MPC · JPL
132909	2002 SS_{14}	—	September 27, 2002	Palomar	NEAT	·	3.4 km	MPC · JPL
132910	2002 SL_{16}	—	September 27, 2002	Palomar	NEAT	·	2.9 km	MPC · JPL
132911	2002 SH_{19}	—	September 27, 2002	Anderson Mesa	LONEOS	·	3.5 km	MPC · JPL
132912	2002 SX_{21}	—	September 26, 2002	Palomar	NEAT	EOS	3.4 km	MPC · JPL
132913	2002 SJ_{24}	—	September 27, 2002	Socorro	LINEAR	·	3.8 km	MPC · JPL
132914	2002 SX_{25}	—	September 28, 2002	Haleakala	NEAT	·	6.2 km	MPC · JPL
132915	2002 SV_{27}	—	September 26, 2002	Palomar	NEAT	·	3.0 km	MPC · JPL
132916	2002 SE_{28}	—	September 29, 2002	Ondřejov	P. Pravec	·	3.2 km	MPC · JPL
132917	2002 SW_{29}	—	September 28, 2002	Haleakala	NEAT	·	4.0 km	MPC · JPL
132918	2002 SN_{30}	—	September 28, 2002	Haleakala	NEAT	·	6.0 km	MPC · JPL
132919	2002 SX_{34}	—	September 29, 2002	Haleakala	NEAT	·	4.9 km	MPC · JPL
132920	2002 SY_{37}	—	September 29, 2002	Haleakala	NEAT	·	6.5 km	MPC · JPL
132921	2002 SA_{42}	—	September 28, 2002	Palomar	NEAT	·	8.4 km	MPC · JPL
132922	2002 SJ_{43}	—	September 28, 2002	Haleakala	NEAT	·	3.0 km	MPC · JPL
132923	2002 SM_{47}	—	September 30, 2002	Socorro	LINEAR	EOS ·	7.3 km	MPC · JPL
132924	2002 SF_{49}	—	September 30, 2002	Socorro	LINEAR	·	4.1 km	MPC · JPL
132925	2002 SO_{49}	—	September 30, 2002	Socorro	LINEAR	THM	3.8 km	MPC · JPL
132926	2002 SA_{50}	—	September 30, 2002	Haleakala	NEAT	·	5.2 km	MPC · JPL
132927	2002 SQ_{52}	—	September 18, 2002	Palomar	NEAT	·	5.5 km	MPC · JPL
132928	2002 SD_{53}	—	September 18, 2002	Palomar	NEAT	·	5.7 km	MPC · JPL
132929	2002 SY_{54}	—	September 30, 2002	Socorro	LINEAR	·	5.0 km	MPC · JPL
132930	2002 ST_{56}	—	September 30, 2002	Socorro	LINEAR	·	4.4 km	MPC · JPL
132931	2002 SQ_{61}	—	September 16, 2002	Palomar	NEAT	·	2.7 km	MPC · JPL
132932	2002 SO_{64}	—	September 27, 2002	Palomar	NEAT	EUP	11 km	MPC · JPL
132933	2002 TC	—	October 1, 2002	Anderson Mesa	LONEOS	·	3.8 km	MPC · JPL
132934	2002 TC_{11}	—	October 1, 2002	Anderson Mesa	LONEOS	·	4.5 km	MPC · JPL
132935	2002 TO_{14}	—	October 1, 2002	Anderson Mesa	LONEOS	HYG	5.3 km	MPC · JPL
132936	2002 TC_{16}	—	October 2, 2002	Socorro	LINEAR	·	2.7 km	MPC · JPL
132937	2002 TN_{19}	—	October 2, 2002	Socorro	LINEAR	THM	6.4 km	MPC · JPL
132938	2002 TC_{28}	—	October 2, 2002	Socorro	LINEAR	THM	3.7 km	MPC · JPL
132939	2002 TV_{31}	—	October 2, 2002	Socorro	LINEAR	·	2.9 km	MPC · JPL
132940	2002 TW_{32}	—	October 2, 2002	Socorro	LINEAR	·	2.2 km	MPC · JPL
132941	2002 TG_{40}	—	October 2, 2002	Socorro	LINEAR	HYG	8.7 km	MPC · JPL
132942	2002 TB_{41}	—	October 2, 2002	Socorro	LINEAR	·	6.9 km	MPC · JPL
132943	2002 TC_{42}	—	October 2, 2002	Socorro	LINEAR	THM	5.8 km	MPC · JPL
132944	2002 TS_{46}	—	October 2, 2002	Socorro	LINEAR	·	6.9 km	MPC · JPL
132945	2002 TQ_{54}	—	October 2, 2002	Socorro	LINEAR	THM	4.4 km	MPC · JPL
132946	2002 TG_{59}	—	October 4, 2002	Pla D'Arguines	R. Ferrando	EUN	2.1 km	MPC · JPL
132947	2002 TB_{61}	—	October 3, 2002	Palomar	NEAT	URS	7.8 km	MPC · JPL
132948	2002 TL_{64}	—	October 4, 2002	Palomar	NEAT	CYB	6.9 km	MPC · JPL
132949	2002 TE_{71}	—	October 3, 2002	Palomar	NEAT	·	8.3 km	MPC · JPL
132950	2002 TH_{71}	—	October 3, 2002	Palomar	NEAT	·	4.1 km	MPC · JPL
132951	2002 TN_{71}	—	October 3, 2002	Palomar	NEAT	·	6.0 km	MPC · JPL
132952	2002 TM_{72}	—	October 3, 2002	Palomar	NEAT	·	7.9 km	MPC · JPL
132953	2002 TM_{83}	—	October 2, 2002	Socorro	LINEAR	URS	7.6 km	MPC · JPL
132954	2002 TT_{83}	—	October 2, 2002	Haleakala	NEAT	·	3.1 km	MPC · JPL
132955	2002 TD_{85}	—	October 2, 2002	Haleakala	NEAT	ADE	4.8 km	MPC · JPL
132956	2002 TG_{95}	—	October 3, 2002	Socorro	LINEAR	·	5.4 km	MPC · JPL
132957	2002 TW_{95}	—	October 3, 2002	Palomar	NEAT	·	7.2 km	MPC · JPL
132958	2002 TR_{108}	—	October 1, 2002	Haleakala	NEAT	·	6.6 km	MPC · JPL
132959	2002 TW_{108}	—	October 1, 2002	Haleakala	NEAT	EOS	3.8 km	MPC · JPL
132960	2002 TL_{115}	—	October 3, 2002	Palomar	NEAT	EOS	4.7 km	MPC · JPL
132961	2002 TG_{117}	—	October 3, 2002	Palomar	NEAT	(1101)	9.8 km	MPC · JPL
132962	2002 TZ_{117}	—	October 3, 2002	Palomar	NEAT	TIR	7.6 km	MPC · JPL
132963	2002 TM_{122}	—	October 4, 2002	Palomar	NEAT	·	6.9 km	MPC · JPL
132964	2002 TH_{126}	—	October 4, 2002	Socorro	LINEAR	·	2.1 km	MPC · JPL
132965	2002 TC_{131}	—	October 4, 2002	Socorro	LINEAR	·	5.3 km	MPC · JPL
132966	2002 TF_{131}	—	October 4, 2002	Socorro	LINEAR	·	4.3 km	MPC · JPL
132967	2002 TW_{133}	—	October 4, 2002	Socorro	LINEAR	·	3.0 km	MPC · JPL
132968	2002 TT_{136}	—	October 4, 2002	Anderson Mesa	LONEOS	LIX	9.6 km	MPC · JPL
132969	2002 TS_{137}	—	October 4, 2002	Anderson Mesa	LONEOS	GEF	3.2 km	MPC · JPL
132970	2002 TQ_{142}	—	October 4, 2002	Socorro	LINEAR	·	7.0 km	MPC · JPL
132971	2002 TM_{143}	—	October 4, 2002	Socorro	LINEAR	URS	6.7 km	MPC · JPL
132972	2002 TW_{164}	—	October 5, 2002	Palomar	NEAT	H	950 m	MPC · JPL
132973	2002 TZ_{164}	—	October 2, 2002	Haleakala	NEAT	EOS	4.6 km	MPC · JPL
132974	2002 TP_{168}	—	October 3, 2002	Palomar	NEAT	·	7.5 km	MPC · JPL
132975	2002 TT_{172}	—	October 4, 2002	Anderson Mesa	LONEOS	·	10 km	MPC · JPL
132976	2002 TF_{173}	—	October 4, 2002	Socorro	LINEAR	HYG	7.4 km	MPC · JPL
132977	2002 TM_{177}	—	October 11, 2002	Palomar	NEAT	H	860 m	MPC · JPL
132978	2002 TT_{183}	—	October 4, 2002	Socorro	LINEAR	·	4.0 km	MPC · JPL
132979	2002 TJ_{186}	—	October 4, 2002	Socorro	LINEAR	·	5.0 km	MPC · JPL
132980	2002 TM_{188}	—	October 4, 2002	Socorro	LINEAR	GEF	3.6 km	MPC · JPL
132981	2002 TD_{190}	—	October 6, 2002	Socorro	LINEAR	·	5.7 km	MPC · JPL
132982	2002 TX_{192}	—	October 3, 2002	Socorro	LINEAR	EOS	4.4 km	MPC · JPL
132983	2002 TV_{196}	—	October 4, 2002	Palomar	NEAT	HYG	5.6 km	MPC · JPL
132984	2002 TO_{197}	—	October 4, 2002	Socorro	LINEAR	·	8.4 km	MPC · JPL
132985	2002 TV_{198}	—	October 5, 2002	Anderson Mesa	LONEOS	·	2.9 km	MPC · JPL
132986	2002 TD_{205}	—	October 4, 2002	Socorro	LINEAR	·	4.5 km	MPC · JPL
132987	2002 TO_{205}	—	October 4, 2002	Socorro	LINEAR	·	8.5 km	MPC · JPL
132988	2002 TM_{211}	—	October 5, 2002	Socorro	LINEAR	·	4.6 km	MPC · JPL
132989	2002 TX_{219}	—	October 5, 2002	Socorro	LINEAR	EOS	5.1 km	MPC · JPL
132990	2002 TV_{226}	—	October 8, 2002	Anderson Mesa	LONEOS	·	5.5 km	MPC · JPL
132991	2002 TY_{227}	—	October 8, 2002	Anderson Mesa	LONEOS	·	5.6 km	MPC · JPL
132992	2002 TS_{230}	—	October 7, 2002	Palomar	NEAT	·	3.6 km	MPC · JPL
132993	2002 TK_{234}	—	October 6, 2002	Socorro	LINEAR	·	4.5 km	MPC · JPL
132994	2002 TP_{240}	—	October 6, 2002	Palomar	NEAT	·	7.3 km	MPC · JPL
132995	2002 TY_{241}	—	October 7, 2002	Haleakala	NEAT	·	4.5 km	MPC · JPL
132996	2002 TT_{253}	—	October 9, 2002	Anderson Mesa	LONEOS	·	3.9 km	MPC · JPL
132997	2002 TO_{258}	—	October 9, 2002	Socorro	LINEAR	·	5.1 km	MPC · JPL
132998	2002 TL_{269}	—	October 9, 2002	Socorro	LINEAR	·	3.8 km	MPC · JPL
132999	2002 TO_{269}	—	October 9, 2002	Socorro	LINEAR	·	5.9 km	MPC · JPL
133000	2002 TL_{278}	—	October 10, 2002	Socorro	LINEAR	·	6.9 km	MPC · JPL

back to top

== See also ==
- Meanings of minor-planet names: 132001–133000
