= Museo Civico di Storia Naturale Giacomo Doria =

Natural history museum in Genoa, Italy

Coordinates: 44°24′09″N 8°56′34″E

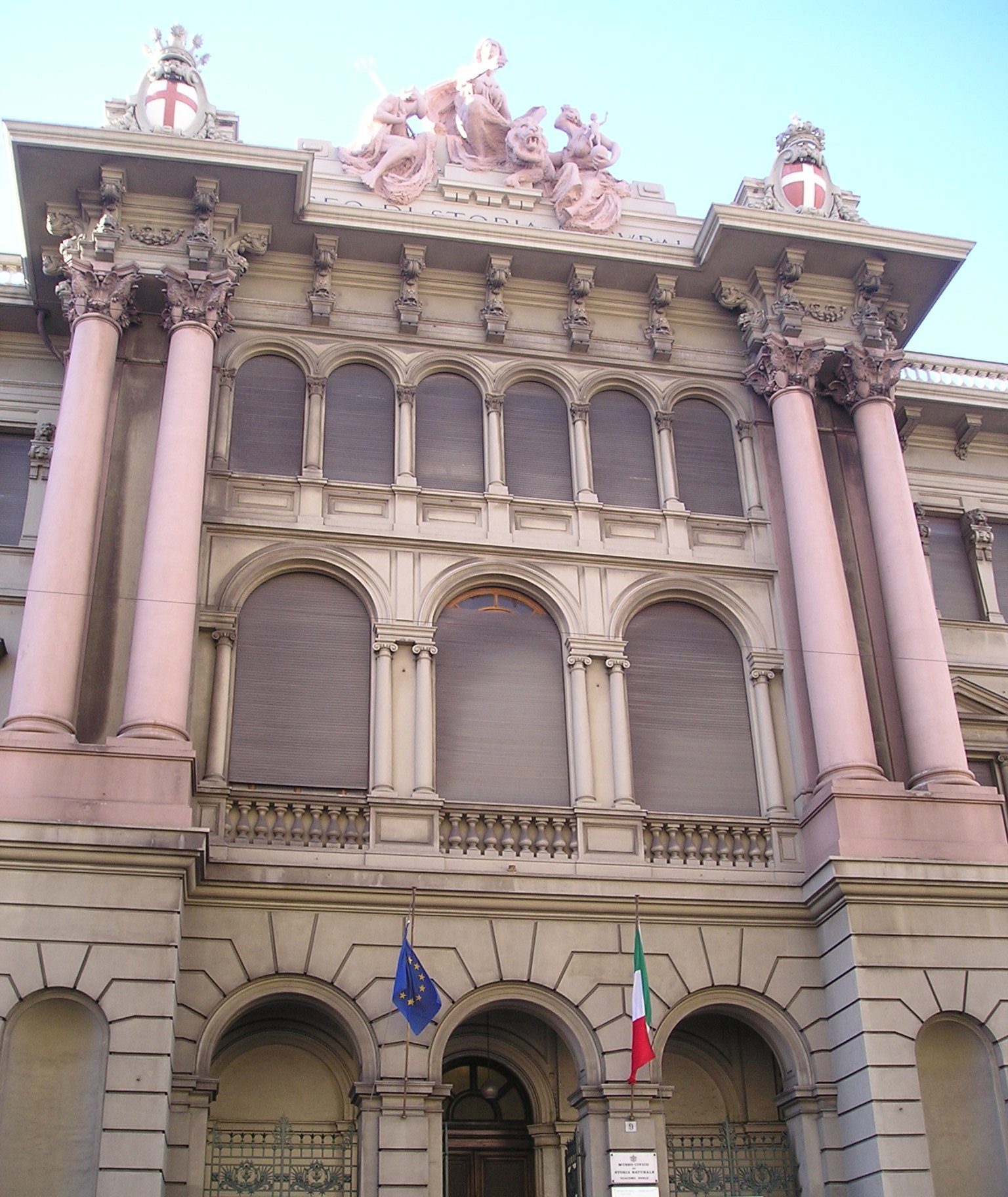
The front façade of the museum

The Museo Civico di Storia Naturale Giacomo Doria is a natural history museum in Genoa, northern Italy. It is named after the naturalist Giacomo Doria, who was the founder and the curator for over forty years. as well as an Italian naturalist, botanist, herpetologist, and politician.

The museum was founded in 1867 and contains over four million specimens from all over the world. It contains zoological, botanical and geological collections. Important collections include those of Luigi D'Albertis, Leonardo Fea, Arturo Issel, Orazio Antinori, Odoardo Beccari and Lamberto Loria. Since 1922, it has been the headquarters of the Società entomologica italiana (lit. 'Italian Entomological Society').

== History ==
The museum originated from an idea and the support, especially financial, of Giacomo Doria.

The first woman to serve as the Museum's director was Lilia Capocaccia, herpetologist, in 1954 and she became director in 1976. She remained in that position until 1996 when she retired, but retained the title of honorary curator.
