= List of minor planets: 130001–131000 =

The following is a partial list of minor planets, running from minor-planet number 130001 through 131000, inclusive. The primary data for this and other partial lists is based on JPL's "Small-Body Orbital Elements" and data available from the Minor Planet Center. Critical list information is also provided by the MPC, unless otherwise specified from Lowell Observatory. A detailed description of the table's columns and additional sources are given on the main page including a complete list of every page in this series, and a statistical break-up on the dynamical classification of minor planets.

Also see the summary list of all named bodies in numerical and alphabetical order, and the corresponding naming citations for the number range of this particular list. New namings may only be added to this list after official publication, as the preannouncement of names is condemned by the Working Group for Small Bodies Nomenclature of the International Astronomical Union.

Near-Earth obj.	MBA (inner)	MBA (outer)	Centaur
Mars-crosser	MBA (middle)	Jupiter trojan	Trans-Neptunian obj.
Unclassified

== 130001–130100 ==
Designation			Discovery			Properties		Ref
Permanent	Provisional	Named after	Date	Site	Discoverer(s)	Category	Diam.	Ref
130001	1999 VC_{34}	—	November 3, 1999	Socorro	LINEAR	·	2.5 km	MPC · JPL
130002	1999 VR_{35}	—	November 3, 1999	Socorro	LINEAR	·	3.8 km	MPC · JPL
130003	1999 VB_{39}	—	November 10, 1999	Socorro	LINEAR	·	1.8 km	MPC · JPL
130004	1999 VN_{42}	—	November 4, 1999	Kitt Peak	Spacewatch	·	1.7 km	MPC · JPL
130005	1999 VE_{43}	—	November 4, 1999	Kitt Peak	Spacewatch	·	3.7 km	MPC · JPL
130006 Imranaslam	1999 VB_{45}	Imranaslam	November 4, 1999	Catalina	CSS	·	2.4 km	MPC · JPL
130007 Frankteti	1999 VC_{45}	Frankteti	November 4, 1999	Catalina	CSS	·	2.4 km	MPC · JPL
130008	1999 VU_{46}	—	November 3, 1999	Socorro	LINEAR	H	1.0 km	MPC · JPL
130009	1999 VH_{52}	—	November 3, 1999	Socorro	LINEAR	·	1.9 km	MPC · JPL
130010	1999 VR_{52}	—	November 3, 1999	Socorro	LINEAR	H	1.1 km	MPC · JPL
130011	1999 VP_{53}	—	November 4, 1999	Socorro	LINEAR	·	2.3 km	MPC · JPL
130012	1999 VR_{53}	—	November 4, 1999	Socorro	LINEAR	·	2.1 km	MPC · JPL
130013	1999 VB_{56}	—	November 4, 1999	Socorro	LINEAR	·	2.4 km	MPC · JPL
130014	1999 VZ_{56}	—	November 4, 1999	Socorro	LINEAR	·	1.8 km	MPC · JPL
130015	1999 VF_{57}	—	November 4, 1999	Socorro	LINEAR	(29841)	2.3 km	MPC · JPL
130016	1999 VU_{59}	—	November 4, 1999	Socorro	LINEAR	(5)	2.8 km	MPC · JPL
130017	1999 VB_{66}	—	November 4, 1999	Socorro	LINEAR	·	2.0 km	MPC · JPL
130018	1999 VK_{67}	—	November 4, 1999	Socorro	LINEAR	·	2.7 km	MPC · JPL
130019	1999 VW_{68}	—	November 4, 1999	Socorro	LINEAR	·	1.9 km	MPC · JPL
130020	1999 VC_{69}	—	November 4, 1999	Socorro	LINEAR	·	2.2 km	MPC · JPL
130021	1999 VY_{74}	—	November 5, 1999	Kitt Peak	Spacewatch	·	2.6 km	MPC · JPL
130022	1999 VD_{77}	—	November 5, 1999	Kitt Peak	Spacewatch	KOR	2.1 km	MPC · JPL
130023	1999 VV_{77}	—	November 3, 1999	Socorro	LINEAR	·	5.1 km	MPC · JPL
130024	1999 VK_{80}	—	November 4, 1999	Socorro	LINEAR	·	3.7 km	MPC · JPL
130025	1999 VU_{80}	—	November 4, 1999	Socorro	LINEAR	·	2.8 km	MPC · JPL
130026	1999 VG_{84}	—	November 6, 1999	Kitt Peak	Spacewatch	·	2.1 km	MPC · JPL
130027	1999 VC_{88}	—	November 3, 1999	Socorro	LINEAR	·	2.8 km	MPC · JPL
130028	1999 VO_{90}	—	November 5, 1999	Socorro	LINEAR	·	1.7 km	MPC · JPL
130029	1999 VR_{93}	—	November 9, 1999	Socorro	LINEAR	·	2.1 km	MPC · JPL
130030	1999 VH_{95}	—	November 9, 1999	Socorro	LINEAR	·	2.4 km	MPC · JPL
130031	1999 VT_{96}	—	November 9, 1999	Socorro	LINEAR	·	2.0 km	MPC · JPL
130032	1999 VE_{98}	—	November 9, 1999	Socorro	LINEAR	·	5.0 km	MPC · JPL
130033	1999 VP_{98}	—	November 9, 1999	Socorro	LINEAR	·	4.0 km	MPC · JPL
130034	1999 VT_{99}	—	November 9, 1999	Socorro	LINEAR	MRX	2.0 km	MPC · JPL
130035	1999 VA_{123}	—	November 5, 1999	Kitt Peak	Spacewatch	(5)	2.3 km	MPC · JPL
130036	1999 VO_{125}	—	November 6, 1999	Kitt Peak	Spacewatch	KON	2.9 km	MPC · JPL
130037	1999 VR_{125}	—	November 6, 1999	Kitt Peak	Spacewatch	·	2.3 km	MPC · JPL
130038	1999 VM_{127}	—	November 9, 1999	Kitt Peak	Spacewatch	·	2.6 km	MPC · JPL
130039	1999 VY_{136}	—	November 12, 1999	Socorro	LINEAR	·	2.8 km	MPC · JPL
130040	1999 VO_{137}	—	November 12, 1999	Socorro	LINEAR	·	1.3 km	MPC · JPL
130041	1999 VL_{140}	—	November 10, 1999	Kitt Peak	Spacewatch	ADE	4.3 km	MPC · JPL
130042	1999 VE_{147}	—	November 12, 1999	Socorro	LINEAR	EUN	1.6 km	MPC · JPL
130043	1999 VZ_{148}	—	November 14, 1999	Socorro	LINEAR	·	3.1 km	MPC · JPL
130044	1999 VK_{149}	—	November 14, 1999	Socorro	LINEAR	WIT	1.7 km	MPC · JPL
130045	1999 VZ_{157}	—	November 14, 1999	Socorro	LINEAR	(5)	2.1 km	MPC · JPL
130046	1999 VF_{159}	—	November 14, 1999	Socorro	LINEAR	·	2.7 km	MPC · JPL
130047	1999 VJ_{163}	—	November 14, 1999	Socorro	LINEAR	·	2.5 km	MPC · JPL
130048	1999 VG_{164}	—	November 14, 1999	Socorro	LINEAR	·	2.6 km	MPC · JPL
130049	1999 VU_{166}	—	November 14, 1999	Socorro	LINEAR	·	2.4 km	MPC · JPL
130050	1999 VL_{167}	—	November 14, 1999	Socorro	LINEAR	·	3.0 km	MPC · JPL
130051	1999 VK_{168}	—	November 14, 1999	Socorro	LINEAR	·	1.8 km	MPC · JPL
130052	1999 VO_{171}	—	November 14, 1999	Socorro	LINEAR	·	2.5 km	MPC · JPL
130053	1999 VW_{171}	—	November 14, 1999	Socorro	LINEAR	H	1.0 km	MPC · JPL
130054	1999 VM_{173}	—	November 15, 1999	Socorro	LINEAR	WIT	1.7 km	MPC · JPL
130055	1999 VY_{173}	—	November 1, 1999	Anderson Mesa	LONEOS	V	1.5 km	MPC · JPL
130056	1999 VA_{177}	—	November 5, 1999	Socorro	LINEAR	EUN	2.1 km	MPC · JPL
130057	1999 VA_{179}	—	November 6, 1999	Socorro	LINEAR	·	2.5 km	MPC · JPL
130058	1999 VN_{179}	—	November 6, 1999	Socorro	LINEAR	GEF	2.8 km	MPC · JPL
130059	1999 VT_{181}	—	November 9, 1999	Socorro	LINEAR	·	2.7 km	MPC · JPL
130060	1999 VO_{185}	—	November 15, 1999	Socorro	LINEAR	·	2.9 km	MPC · JPL
130061	1999 VR_{187}	—	November 15, 1999	Socorro	LINEAR	MIS	3.9 km	MPC · JPL
130062	1999 VU_{188}	—	November 15, 1999	Socorro	LINEAR	GEF	2.8 km	MPC · JPL
130063	1999 VZ_{191}	—	November 14, 1999	Socorro	LINEAR	·	2.2 km	MPC · JPL
130064	1999 VB_{192}	—	November 14, 1999	Socorro	LINEAR	(5)	2.4 km	MPC · JPL
130065	1999 VC_{192}	—	November 14, 1999	Socorro	LINEAR	MAR	2.2 km	MPC · JPL
130066 Timhaltigin	1999 VK_{193}	Timhaltigin	November 1, 1999	Catalina	CSS	·	3.5 km	MPC · JPL
130067 Marius-Phaneuf	1999 VM_{194}	Marius-Phaneuf	November 1, 1999	Catalina	CSS	·	2.7 km	MPC · JPL
130068	1999 VH_{196}	—	November 4, 1999	Anderson Mesa	LONEOS	·	6.0 km	MPC · JPL
130069 Danielgaudreau	1999 VV_{196}	Danielgaudreau	November 1, 1999	Catalina	CSS	·	3.8 km	MPC · JPL
130070	1999 VK_{197}	—	November 3, 1999	Anderson Mesa	LONEOS	·	2.4 km	MPC · JPL
130071 Claudebrunet	1999 VD_{198}	Claudebrunet	November 3, 1999	Catalina	CSS	·	2.1 km	MPC · JPL
130072 Ilincaignat	1999 VL_{198}	Ilincaignat	November 3, 1999	Catalina	CSS	·	4.9 km	MPC · JPL
130073	1999 VH_{204}	—	November 9, 1999	Anderson Mesa	LONEOS	·	3.2 km	MPC · JPL
130074	1999 VG_{205}	—	November 11, 1999	Kitt Peak	Spacewatch	·	4.3 km	MPC · JPL
130075	1999 VO_{217}	—	November 5, 1999	Socorro	LINEAR	V	1.6 km	MPC · JPL
130076	1999 VA_{224}	—	November 5, 1999	Socorro	LINEAR	HOF	5.1 km	MPC · JPL
130077	1999 VA_{225}	—	November 5, 1999	Socorro	LINEAR	(5)	2.4 km	MPC · JPL
130078 Taschner	1999 WH_{2}	Taschner	November 26, 1999	Linz	E. Meyer	·	1.7 km	MPC · JPL
130079	1999 WW_{2}	—	November 26, 1999	Višnjan Observatory	K. Korlević	NYS	1.9 km	MPC · JPL
130080	1999 WQ_{6}	—	November 28, 1999	Višnjan Observatory	K. Korlević	·	3.1 km	MPC · JPL
130081	1999 WM_{12}	—	November 29, 1999	Kitt Peak	Spacewatch	·	2.3 km	MPC · JPL
130082	1999 WP_{13}	—	November 29, 1999	Višnjan Observatory	K. Korlević	·	5.8 km	MPC · JPL
130083	1999 WV_{14}	—	November 28, 1999	Kitt Peak	Spacewatch	·	3.7 km	MPC · JPL
130084	1999 WM_{16}	—	November 29, 1999	Kitt Peak	Spacewatch	·	2.2 km	MPC · JPL
130085	1999 WX_{16}	—	November 30, 1999	Kitt Peak	Spacewatch	·	4.5 km	MPC · JPL
130086	1999 WW_{17}	—	November 30, 1999	Kitt Peak	Spacewatch	·	1.7 km	MPC · JPL
130087	1999 WA_{25}	—	November 28, 1999	Kitt Peak	Spacewatch	EUN	2.1 km	MPC · JPL
130088 Grantcunningham	1999 XQ_{3}	Grantcunningham	December 4, 1999	Catalina	CSS	EUN	2.0 km	MPC · JPL
130089 Saadatanwar	1999 XC_{5}	Saadatanwar	December 4, 1999	Catalina	CSS	·	3.6 km	MPC · JPL
130090 Heatherbowles	1999 XJ_{6}	Heatherbowles	December 4, 1999	Catalina	CSS	·	2.1 km	MPC · JPL
130091	1999 XC_{10}	—	December 5, 1999	Kitt Peak	Spacewatch	H	1.1 km	MPC · JPL
130092	1999 XD_{13}	—	December 5, 1999	Socorro	LINEAR	·	3.1 km	MPC · JPL
130093	1999 XP_{14}	—	December 3, 1999	Socorro	LINEAR	·	4.5 km	MPC · JPL
130094	1999 XW_{14}	—	December 6, 1999	Socorro	LINEAR	H	990 m	MPC · JPL
130095	1999 XR_{16}	—	December 7, 1999	Socorro	LINEAR	·	6.0 km	MPC · JPL
130096	1999 XJ_{19}	—	December 3, 1999	Socorro	LINEAR	·	1.8 km	MPC · JPL
130097	1999 XW_{20}	—	December 5, 1999	Socorro	LINEAR	·	3.9 km	MPC · JPL
130098	1999 XM_{21}	—	December 5, 1999	Socorro	LINEAR	DOR	5.1 km	MPC · JPL
130099	1999 XU_{22}	—	December 6, 1999	Socorro	LINEAR	·	4.1 km	MPC · JPL
130100	1999 XY_{28}	—	December 6, 1999	Socorro	LINEAR	·	4.9 km	MPC · JPL

== 130101–130200 ==
back to top

Designation			Discovery			Properties		Ref
Permanent	Provisional	Named after	Date	Site	Discoverer(s)	Category	Diam.	Ref
130101	1999 XM_{29}	—	December 6, 1999	Socorro	LINEAR	·	4.1 km	MPC · JPL
130102	1999 XO_{30}	—	December 6, 1999	Socorro	LINEAR	EUN	2.8 km	MPC · JPL
130103	1999 XR_{30}	—	December 6, 1999	Socorro	LINEAR	·	4.4 km	MPC · JPL
130104	1999 XB_{41}	—	December 7, 1999	Socorro	LINEAR	GEF	2.4 km	MPC · JPL
130105	1999 XW_{42}	—	December 7, 1999	Socorro	LINEAR	NYS	2.1 km	MPC · JPL
130106	1999 XT_{47}	—	December 7, 1999	Socorro	LINEAR	·	3.1 km	MPC · JPL
130107	1999 XS_{51}	—	December 7, 1999	Socorro	LINEAR	·	1.8 km	MPC · JPL
130108	1999 XQ_{58}	—	December 7, 1999	Socorro	LINEAR	·	2.9 km	MPC · JPL
130109	1999 XC_{65}	—	December 7, 1999	Socorro	LINEAR	·	3.1 km	MPC · JPL
130110	1999 XQ_{65}	—	December 7, 1999	Socorro	LINEAR	·	3.1 km	MPC · JPL
130111	1999 XR_{67}	—	December 7, 1999	Socorro	LINEAR	·	4.7 km	MPC · JPL
130112	1999 XF_{70}	—	December 7, 1999	Socorro	LINEAR	·	4.5 km	MPC · JPL
130113	1999 XY_{72}	—	December 7, 1999	Socorro	LINEAR	·	2.4 km	MPC · JPL
130114	1999 XS_{73}	—	December 7, 1999	Socorro	LINEAR	·	4.1 km	MPC · JPL
130115	1999 XO_{78}	—	December 7, 1999	Socorro	LINEAR	·	3.3 km	MPC · JPL
130116	1999 XH_{79}	—	December 7, 1999	Socorro	LINEAR	·	2.6 km	MPC · JPL
130117	1999 XD_{80}	—	December 7, 1999	Socorro	LINEAR	·	4.4 km	MPC · JPL
130118	1999 XR_{80}	—	December 7, 1999	Socorro	LINEAR	AGN	1.9 km	MPC · JPL
130119	1999 XH_{81}	—	December 7, 1999	Socorro	LINEAR	·	2.9 km	MPC · JPL
130120	1999 XH_{84}	—	December 7, 1999	Socorro	LINEAR	EUN	2.9 km	MPC · JPL
130121	1999 XH_{86}	—	December 7, 1999	Socorro	LINEAR	·	7.9 km	MPC · JPL
130122	1999 XZ_{90}	—	December 7, 1999	Socorro	LINEAR	·	3.5 km	MPC · JPL
130123	1999 XJ_{92}	—	December 7, 1999	Socorro	LINEAR	·	4.3 km	MPC · JPL
130124	1999 XJ_{105}	—	December 10, 1999	Les Tardieux Obs.	Boeuf, M.	H	1.5 km	MPC · JPL
130125	1999 XV_{105}	—	December 11, 1999	Oizumi	T. Kobayashi	(194)	3.8 km	MPC · JPL
130126 Stillmanchase	1999 XW_{106}	Stillmanchase	December 4, 1999	Catalina	CSS	·	3.6 km	MPC · JPL
130127 Zoltanfarkas	1999 XC_{110}	Zoltanfarkas	December 4, 1999	Catalina	CSS	·	3.5 km	MPC · JPL
130128 Tarafisher	1999 XG_{118}	Tarafisher	December 5, 1999	Catalina	CSS	EOS	3.4 km	MPC · JPL
130129	1999 XS_{127}	—	December 12, 1999	Goodricke-Pigott	R. A. Tucker	H	1.1 km	MPC · JPL
130130	1999 XB_{133}	—	December 12, 1999	Socorro	LINEAR	EUN	3.1 km	MPC · JPL
130131	1999 XC_{133}	—	December 12, 1999	Socorro	LINEAR	ADE	5.8 km	MPC · JPL
130132	1999 XQ_{133}	—	December 12, 1999	Socorro	LINEAR	·	6.2 km	MPC · JPL
130133	1999 XP_{134}	—	December 3, 1999	Socorro	LINEAR	H	1.2 km	MPC · JPL
130134	1999 XR_{135}	—	December 8, 1999	Socorro	LINEAR	H	1.2 km	MPC · JPL
130135	1999 XF_{136}	—	December 13, 1999	Socorro	LINEAR	H	1.2 km	MPC · JPL
130136	1999 XP_{137}	—	December 3, 1999	Anderson Mesa	LONEOS	·	3.2 km	MPC · JPL
130137	1999 XT_{137}	—	December 11, 1999	Uccle	T. Pauwels	RAF	1.5 km	MPC · JPL
130138	1999 XT_{145}	—	December 7, 1999	Kitt Peak	Spacewatch	AGN	2.3 km	MPC · JPL
130139	1999 XF_{148}	—	December 7, 1999	Kitt Peak	Spacewatch	·	4.0 km	MPC · JPL
130140	1999 XC_{150}	—	December 8, 1999	Kitt Peak	Spacewatch	RAF	2.0 km	MPC · JPL
130141	1999 XZ_{153}	—	December 8, 1999	Socorro	LINEAR	·	2.8 km	MPC · JPL
130142	1999 XP_{157}	—	December 8, 1999	Socorro	LINEAR	·	3.3 km	MPC · JPL
130143	1999 XC_{177}	—	December 10, 1999	Socorro	LINEAR	·	3.6 km	MPC · JPL
130144	1999 XQ_{182}	—	December 12, 1999	Socorro	LINEAR	EUN	3.8 km	MPC · JPL
130145	1999 XD_{186}	—	December 12, 1999	Socorro	LINEAR	RAF	2.7 km	MPC · JPL
130146	1999 XS_{191}	—	December 12, 1999	Socorro	LINEAR	TEL	4.3 km	MPC · JPL
130147	1999 XF_{199}	—	December 12, 1999	Socorro	LINEAR	·	3.9 km	MPC · JPL
130148	1999 XT_{202}	—	December 12, 1999	Socorro	LINEAR	·	8.0 km	MPC · JPL
130149	1999 XZ_{204}	—	December 12, 1999	Socorro	LINEAR	·	4.1 km	MPC · JPL
130150	1999 XJ_{206}	—	December 12, 1999	Socorro	LINEAR	·	4.4 km	MPC · JPL
130151	1999 XB_{209}	—	December 13, 1999	Socorro	LINEAR	·	3.6 km	MPC · JPL
130152	1999 XV_{213}	—	December 14, 1999	Socorro	LINEAR	·	4.4 km	MPC · JPL
130153	1999 XA_{217}	—	December 13, 1999	Kitt Peak	Spacewatch	·	1.7 km	MPC · JPL
130154	1999 XQ_{220}	—	December 14, 1999	Socorro	LINEAR	·	4.1 km	MPC · JPL
130155	1999 XD_{223}	—	December 15, 1999	Socorro	LINEAR	·	9.0 km	MPC · JPL
130156	1999 XS_{225}	—	December 13, 1999	Kitt Peak	Spacewatch	KOR	2.6 km	MPC · JPL
130157	1999 XL_{228}	—	December 14, 1999	Kitt Peak	Spacewatch	(5)	2.7 km	MPC · JPL
130158 Orsonjohn	1999 XD_{231}	Orsonjohn	December 7, 1999	Catalina	CSS	·	5.5 km	MPC · JPL
130159	1999 XH_{233}	—	December 2, 1999	Anderson Mesa	LONEOS	·	3.2 km	MPC · JPL
130160	1999 XP_{235}	—	December 2, 1999	Kitt Peak	Spacewatch	·	3.2 km	MPC · JPL
130161 Iankubik	1999 XG_{237}	Iankubik	December 5, 1999	Catalina	CSS	·	3.4 km	MPC · JPL
130162	1999 YM	—	December 16, 1999	Socorro	LINEAR	H	920 m	MPC · JPL
130163	1999 YX_{5}	—	December 29, 1999	Socorro	LINEAR	H	1.2 km	MPC · JPL
130164	1999 YW_{9}	—	December 27, 1999	Kitt Peak	Spacewatch	·	2.8 km	MPC · JPL
130165	1999 YV_{11}	—	December 27, 1999	Kitt Peak	Spacewatch	·	2.9 km	MPC · JPL
130166	1999 YL_{17}	—	December 31, 1999	Kitt Peak	Spacewatch	THM	2.9 km	MPC · JPL
130167	1999 YV_{27}	—	December 30, 1999	Socorro	LINEAR	·	5.9 km	MPC · JPL
130168	1999 YX_{27}	—	December 30, 1999	Socorro	LINEAR	·	5.5 km	MPC · JPL
130169	2000 AG_{1}	—	January 2, 2000	Socorro	LINEAR	PHO	2.9 km	MPC · JPL
130170	2000 AL_{4}	—	January 3, 2000	Kitt Peak	Spacewatch	·	5.4 km	MPC · JPL
130171	2000 AS_{6}	—	January 2, 2000	Socorro	LINEAR	·	5.8 km	MPC · JPL
130172	2000 AU_{6}	—	January 2, 2000	Socorro	LINEAR	·	3.2 km	MPC · JPL
130173	2000 AU_{10}	—	January 3, 2000	Socorro	LINEAR	EUN	2.8 km	MPC · JPL
130174	2000 AO_{18}	—	January 3, 2000	Socorro	LINEAR	·	3.5 km	MPC · JPL
130175	2000 AL_{20}	—	January 3, 2000	Socorro	LINEAR	·	5.6 km	MPC · JPL
130176	2000 AO_{28}	—	January 3, 2000	Socorro	LINEAR	·	4.7 km	MPC · JPL
130177	2000 AH_{36}	—	January 3, 2000	Socorro	LINEAR	·	3.2 km	MPC · JPL
130178	2000 AD_{39}	—	January 3, 2000	Socorro	LINEAR	·	4.2 km	MPC · JPL
130179	2000 AC_{45}	—	January 5, 2000	Kitt Peak	Spacewatch	·	3.0 km	MPC · JPL
130180	2000 AP_{52}	—	January 4, 2000	Socorro	LINEAR	·	2.7 km	MPC · JPL
130181	2000 AZ_{52}	—	January 4, 2000	Socorro	LINEAR	BRA	2.8 km	MPC · JPL
130182	2000 AZ_{55}	—	January 4, 2000	Socorro	LINEAR	·	3.5 km	MPC · JPL
130183	2000 AS_{58}	—	January 4, 2000	Socorro	LINEAR	·	7.9 km	MPC · JPL
130184	2000 AA_{60}	—	January 4, 2000	Socorro	LINEAR	·	6.2 km	MPC · JPL
130185	2000 AE_{66}	—	January 4, 2000	Socorro	LINEAR	·	5.9 km	MPC · JPL
130186	2000 AE_{70}	—	January 5, 2000	Socorro	LINEAR	·	6.7 km	MPC · JPL
130187	2000 AJ_{83}	—	January 5, 2000	Socorro	LINEAR	·	3.1 km	MPC · JPL
130188	2000 AZ_{85}	—	January 5, 2000	Socorro	LINEAR	EUN	3.2 km	MPC · JPL
130189	2000 AY_{86}	—	January 5, 2000	Socorro	LINEAR	·	4.5 km	MPC · JPL
130190	2000 AG_{90}	—	January 5, 2000	Socorro	LINEAR	L4	17 km	MPC · JPL
130191	2000 AS_{92}	—	January 2, 2000	Socorro	LINEAR	H	1.1 km	MPC · JPL
130192	2000 AB_{93}	—	January 3, 2000	Socorro	LINEAR	H	1.0 km	MPC · JPL
130193	2000 AM_{95}	—	January 4, 2000	Socorro	LINEAR	·	6.2 km	MPC · JPL
130194	2000 AZ_{128}	—	January 5, 2000	Socorro	LINEAR	·	5.6 km	MPC · JPL
130195	2000 AM_{129}	—	January 5, 2000	Socorro	LINEAR	RAF	1.7 km	MPC · JPL
130196	2000 AW_{133}	—	January 4, 2000	Socorro	LINEAR	·	5.3 km	MPC · JPL
130197	2000 AL_{152}	—	January 8, 2000	Socorro	LINEAR	H	1.2 km	MPC · JPL
130198	2000 AY_{152}	—	January 8, 2000	Socorro	LINEAR	H	1.2 km	MPC · JPL
130199	2000 AC_{161}	—	January 3, 2000	Socorro	LINEAR	·	5.0 km	MPC · JPL
130200	2000 AG_{167}	—	January 8, 2000	Socorro	LINEAR	·	5.4 km	MPC · JPL

== 130201–130300 ==
back to top

Designation			Discovery			Properties		Ref
Permanent	Provisional	Named after	Date	Site	Discoverer(s)	Category	Diam.	Ref
130201	2000 AE_{170}	—	January 7, 2000	Socorro	LINEAR	·	3.3 km	MPC · JPL
130202	2000 AJ_{171}	—	January 7, 2000	Socorro	LINEAR	·	3.1 km	MPC · JPL
130203	2000 AT_{176}	—	January 7, 2000	Socorro	LINEAR	·	2.5 km	MPC · JPL
130204	2000 AZ_{176}	—	January 7, 2000	Socorro	LINEAR	·	4.5 km	MPC · JPL
130205	2000 AY_{181}	—	January 7, 2000	Socorro	LINEAR	·	5.2 km	MPC · JPL
130206	2000 AK_{201}	—	January 9, 2000	Socorro	LINEAR	H	1.2 km	MPC · JPL
130207	2000 AV_{205}	—	January 15, 2000	Višnjan Observatory	K. Korlević	·	3.1 km	MPC · JPL
130208	2000 AB_{211}	—	January 5, 2000	Kitt Peak	Spacewatch	·	3.3 km	MPC · JPL
130209	2000 AZ_{214}	—	January 7, 2000	Kitt Peak	Spacewatch	(5)	2.4 km	MPC · JPL
130210	2000 AX_{217}	—	January 8, 2000	Kitt Peak	Spacewatch	·	2.4 km	MPC · JPL
130211	2000 AF_{219}	—	January 8, 2000	Kitt Peak	Spacewatch	EOS	3.3 km	MPC · JPL
130212	2000 AD_{220}	—	January 8, 2000	Kitt Peak	Spacewatch	·	3.3 km	MPC · JPL
130213	2000 AX_{222}	—	January 9, 2000	Kitt Peak	Spacewatch	HOF	4.4 km	MPC · JPL
130214	2000 AC_{227}	—	January 10, 2000	Kitt Peak	Spacewatch	THM	2.4 km	MPC · JPL
130215	2000 AK_{228}	—	January 13, 2000	Kitt Peak	Spacewatch	KOR	2.6 km	MPC · JPL
130216	2000 AC_{238}	—	January 6, 2000	Socorro	LINEAR	·	3.5 km	MPC · JPL
130217	2000 AA_{239}	—	January 6, 2000	Socorro	LINEAR	·	4.4 km	MPC · JPL
130218	2000 AG_{239}	—	January 6, 2000	Socorro	LINEAR	THM	4.0 km	MPC · JPL
130219	2000 AG_{242}	—	January 7, 2000	Anderson Mesa	LONEOS	·	3.3 km	MPC · JPL
130220	2000 AM_{245}	—	January 9, 2000	Socorro	LINEAR	·	6.6 km	MPC · JPL
130221	2000 AG_{248}	—	January 2, 2000	Kitt Peak	Spacewatch	AST	2.2 km	MPC · JPL
130222	2000 BM	—	January 24, 2000	Višnjan Observatory	K. Korlević	·	4.7 km	MPC · JPL
130223	2000 BA_{2}	—	January 27, 2000	Kitt Peak	Spacewatch	·	4.2 km	MPC · JPL
130224	2000 BL_{7}	—	January 29, 2000	Socorro	LINEAR	KOR	2.7 km	MPC · JPL
130225	2000 BW_{10}	—	January 25, 2000	Bergisch Gladbach	W. Bickel	·	2.8 km	MPC · JPL
130226	2000 BT_{20}	—	January 28, 2000	Kitt Peak	Spacewatch	·	3.1 km	MPC · JPL
130227	2000 BC_{22}	—	January 30, 2000	Kitt Peak	Spacewatch	CYB	5.1 km	MPC · JPL
130228	2000 BV_{32}	—	January 28, 2000	Kitt Peak	Spacewatch	THM	3.8 km	MPC · JPL
130229 Igorlazbin	2000 BV_{33}	Igorlazbin	January 30, 2000	Catalina	CSS	THM	4.5 km	MPC · JPL
130230	2000 BN_{36}	—	January 27, 2000	Kitt Peak	Spacewatch	KOR	2.3 km	MPC · JPL
130231	2000 BS_{38}	—	January 27, 2000	Kitt Peak	Spacewatch	MRX	1.7 km	MPC · JPL
130232	2000 BC_{50}	—	January 16, 2000	Kitt Peak	Spacewatch	KOR	1.9 km	MPC · JPL
130233	2000 CJ_{8}	—	February 2, 2000	Socorro	LINEAR	H	970 m	MPC · JPL
130234	2000 CR_{13}	—	February 2, 2000	Socorro	LINEAR	VER	6.4 km	MPC · JPL
130235	2000 CC_{24}	—	February 2, 2000	Socorro	LINEAR	·	3.7 km	MPC · JPL
130236	2000 CX_{24}	—	February 2, 2000	Socorro	LINEAR	·	8.1 km	MPC · JPL
130237	2000 CJ_{26}	—	February 2, 2000	Socorro	LINEAR	·	4.4 km	MPC · JPL
130238	2000 CK_{32}	—	February 2, 2000	Socorro	LINEAR	·	3.1 km	MPC · JPL
130239	2000 CU_{39}	—	February 2, 2000	Socorro	LINEAR	EUP	7.6 km	MPC · JPL
130240	2000 CD_{41}	—	February 6, 2000	Prescott	P. G. Comba	HYG	4.7 km	MPC · JPL
130241	2000 CE_{53}	—	February 10, 2000	Kitt Peak	Spacewatch	EOS	3.9 km	MPC · JPL
130242	2000 CR_{54}	—	February 2, 2000	Socorro	LINEAR	·	6.7 km	MPC · JPL
130243	2000 CA_{75}	—	February 6, 2000	Socorro	LINEAR	H	1.1 km	MPC · JPL
130244	2000 CD_{76}	—	February 4, 2000	Višnjan Observatory	K. Korlević	·	6.1 km	MPC · JPL
130245	2000 CO_{77}	—	February 8, 2000	Prescott	P. G. Comba	·	5.9 km	MPC · JPL
130246	2000 CN_{83}	—	February 4, 2000	Socorro	LINEAR	EUP · slow	7.5 km	MPC · JPL
130247	2000 CE_{85}	—	February 4, 2000	Socorro	LINEAR	·	5.3 km	MPC · JPL
130248	2000 CV_{90}	—	February 6, 2000	Socorro	LINEAR	·	5.9 km	MPC · JPL
130249 Markminer	2000 CS_{106}	Markminer	February 5, 2000	Catalina	CSS	·	6.4 km	MPC · JPL
130250	2000 CD_{116}	—	February 3, 2000	Socorro	LINEAR	VER	6.3 km	MPC · JPL
130251	2000 CM_{118}	—	February 11, 2000	Socorro	LINEAR	·	4.9 km	MPC · JPL
130252	2000 CN_{135}	—	February 4, 2000	Kitt Peak	Spacewatch	·	2.4 km	MPC · JPL
130253	2000 DV_{2}	—	February 27, 2000	Kitt Peak	Spacewatch	·	2.6 km	MPC · JPL
130254	2000 DJ_{14}	—	February 28, 2000	Kitt Peak	Spacewatch	·	6.0 km	MPC · JPL
130255	2000 DQ_{18}	—	February 29, 2000	Socorro	LINEAR	·	4.1 km	MPC · JPL
130256	2000 DG_{24}	—	February 29, 2000	Socorro	LINEAR	LIX	6.1 km	MPC · JPL
130257	2000 DB_{31}	—	February 29, 2000	Socorro	LINEAR	EOS	3.9 km	MPC · JPL
130258	2000 DL_{33}	—	February 29, 2000	Socorro	LINEAR	·	6.4 km	MPC · JPL
130259	2000 DV_{33}	—	February 29, 2000	Socorro	LINEAR	·	4.3 km	MPC · JPL
130260	2000 DP_{38}	—	February 29, 2000	Socorro	LINEAR	·	7.5 km	MPC · JPL
130261	2000 DV_{38}	—	February 29, 2000	Socorro	LINEAR	·	4.0 km	MPC · JPL
130262	2000 DY_{39}	—	February 29, 2000	Socorro	LINEAR	·	5.7 km	MPC · JPL
130263	2000 DP_{42}	—	February 29, 2000	Socorro	LINEAR	HYG	5.5 km	MPC · JPL
130264	2000 DZ_{44}	—	February 29, 2000	Socorro	LINEAR	·	5.1 km	MPC · JPL
130265	2000 DB_{48}	—	February 29, 2000	Socorro	LINEAR	·	4.7 km	MPC · JPL
130266	2000 DF_{50}	—	February 29, 2000	Socorro	LINEAR	·	2.6 km	MPC · JPL
130267	2000 DK_{53}	—	February 29, 2000	Socorro	LINEAR	·	4.2 km	MPC · JPL
130268	2000 DP_{54}	—	February 29, 2000	Socorro	LINEAR	EOS	3.8 km	MPC · JPL
130269	2000 DU_{54}	—	February 29, 2000	Socorro	LINEAR	THM	5.0 km	MPC · JPL
130270	2000 DZ_{54}	—	February 29, 2000	Socorro	LINEAR	·	5.9 km	MPC · JPL
130271	2000 DJ_{60}	—	February 29, 2000	Socorro	LINEAR	·	5.1 km	MPC · JPL
130272	2000 DY_{60}	—	February 29, 2000	Socorro	LINEAR	THM	5.2 km	MPC · JPL
130273	2000 DV_{64}	—	February 29, 2000	Socorro	LINEAR	·	3.6 km	MPC · JPL
130274	2000 DT_{65}	—	February 29, 2000	Socorro	LINEAR	·	4.2 km	MPC · JPL
130275	2000 DD_{70}	—	February 29, 2000	Socorro	LINEAR	·	3.3 km	MPC · JPL
130276	2000 DY_{76}	—	February 29, 2000	Socorro	LINEAR	·	1.9 km	MPC · JPL
130277	2000 DT_{79}	—	February 28, 2000	Socorro	LINEAR	·	5.5 km	MPC · JPL
130278	2000 DZ_{82}	—	February 28, 2000	Socorro	LINEAR	·	4.2 km	MPC · JPL
130279	2000 DO_{87}	—	February 29, 2000	Socorro	LINEAR	·	7.9 km	MPC · JPL
130280	2000 DJ_{103}	—	February 29, 2000	Socorro	LINEAR	·	5.1 km	MPC · JPL
130281	2000 EM	—	March 2, 2000	Prescott	P. G. Comba	·	4.7 km	MPC · JPL
130282	2000 EZ_{2}	—	March 3, 2000	Socorro	LINEAR	KOR	2.3 km	MPC · JPL
130283 Elizabethgraham	2000 EB_{8}	Elizabethgraham	March 4, 2000	Lake Tekapo	Brady, N.	·	5.7 km	MPC · JPL
130284	2000 EL_{17}	—	March 3, 2000	Socorro	LINEAR	·	3.9 km	MPC · JPL
130285	2000 EW_{18}	—	March 5, 2000	Socorro	LINEAR	·	5.3 km	MPC · JPL
130286	2000 EN_{22}	—	March 3, 2000	Kitt Peak	Spacewatch	·	2.7 km	MPC · JPL
130287	2000 EW_{27}	—	March 4, 2000	Socorro	LINEAR	·	7.4 km	MPC · JPL
130288	2000 ED_{35}	—	March 8, 2000	Socorro	LINEAR	·	3.6 km	MPC · JPL
130289	2000 EX_{35}	—	March 3, 2000	Socorro	LINEAR	KOR	2.9 km	MPC · JPL
130290	2000 EO_{39}	—	March 8, 2000	Socorro	LINEAR	·	4.2 km	MPC · JPL
130291	2000 ES_{39}	—	March 8, 2000	Socorro	LINEAR	THM	6.1 km	MPC · JPL
130292	2000 ER_{41}	—	March 8, 2000	Socorro	LINEAR	VER	5.1 km	MPC · JPL
130293	2000 EH_{44}	—	March 9, 2000	Socorro	LINEAR	·	5.0 km	MPC · JPL
130294	2000 EA_{59}	—	March 9, 2000	Socorro	LINEAR	THM	4.1 km	MPC · JPL
130295	2000 EF_{60}	—	March 10, 2000	Socorro	LINEAR	2:1J	4.3 km	MPC · JPL
130296	2000 EF_{62}	—	March 10, 2000	Socorro	LINEAR	THM	3.8 km	MPC · JPL
130297	2000 ET_{62}	—	March 10, 2000	Socorro	LINEAR	(895)	8.9 km	MPC · JPL
130298	2000 EA_{68}	—	March 10, 2000	Socorro	LINEAR	·	8.7 km	MPC · JPL
130299	2000 EQ_{68}	—	March 10, 2000	Socorro	LINEAR	·	6.1 km	MPC · JPL
130300	2000 EV_{69}	—	March 10, 2000	Socorro	LINEAR	·	6.7 km	MPC · JPL

== 130301–130400 ==
back to top

Designation			Discovery			Properties		Ref
Permanent	Provisional	Named after	Date	Site	Discoverer(s)	Category	Diam.	Ref
130301	2000 EP_{71}	—	March 9, 2000	Kitt Peak	Spacewatch	·	4.4 km	MPC · JPL
130302	2000 EH_{78}	—	March 5, 2000	Socorro	LINEAR	·	4.5 km	MPC · JPL
130303	2000 EO_{79}	—	March 5, 2000	Socorro	LINEAR	·	7.3 km	MPC · JPL
130304	2000 EY_{82}	—	March 5, 2000	Socorro	LINEAR	·	8.0 km	MPC · JPL
130305	2000 EW_{88}	—	March 9, 2000	Socorro	LINEAR	·	3.9 km	MPC · JPL
130306	2000 EN_{96}	—	March 12, 2000	Socorro	LINEAR	·	5.6 km	MPC · JPL
130307	2000 EP_{102}	—	March 14, 2000	Kitt Peak	Spacewatch	·	2.0 km	MPC · JPL
130308	2000 EZ_{102}	—	March 9, 2000	Socorro	LINEAR	·	7.5 km	MPC · JPL
130309	2000 EM_{103}	—	March 12, 2000	Socorro	LINEAR	·	8.5 km	MPC · JPL
130310	2000 EP_{103}	—	March 12, 2000	Socorro	LINEAR	TIR	6.8 km	MPC · JPL
130311	2000 EW_{105}	—	March 11, 2000	Anderson Mesa	LONEOS	·	8.8 km	MPC · JPL
130312	2000 EX_{107}	—	March 8, 2000	Socorro	LINEAR	·	7.1 km	MPC · JPL
130313	2000 EM_{120}	—	March 11, 2000	Anderson Mesa	LONEOS	HYG	5.7 km	MPC · JPL
130314 Williamodonnell	2000 EU_{121}	Williamodonnell	March 11, 2000	Catalina	CSS	(8737)	7.0 km	MPC · JPL
130315	2000 EV_{122}	—	March 11, 2000	Socorro	LINEAR	·	5.1 km	MPC · JPL
130316	2000 EK_{123}	—	March 11, 2000	Anderson Mesa	LONEOS	·	6.9 km	MPC · JPL
130317	2000 EK_{124}	—	March 11, 2000	Anderson Mesa	LONEOS	·	6.1 km	MPC · JPL
130318	2000 EO_{130}	—	March 11, 2000	Anderson Mesa	LONEOS	·	5.0 km	MPC · JPL
130319 Danielpelham	2000 EX_{140}	Danielpelham	March 2, 2000	Catalina	CSS	·	5.7 km	MPC · JPL
130320 Maherrassas	2000 EL_{141}	Maherrassas	March 2, 2000	Catalina	CSS	THM	5.4 km	MPC · JPL
130321	2000 EW_{163}	—	March 3, 2000	Socorro	LINEAR	·	7.2 km	MPC · JPL
130322	2000 EO_{166}	—	March 4, 2000	Socorro	LINEAR	H	1.8 km	MPC · JPL
130323	2000 ED_{169}	—	March 4, 2000	Socorro	LINEAR	·	4.8 km	MPC · JPL
130324	2000 EC_{170}	—	March 5, 2000	Socorro	LINEAR	T_{j} (2.97)	8.4 km	MPC · JPL
130325	2000 EV_{178}	—	March 4, 2000	Socorro	LINEAR	·	7.1 km	MPC · JPL
130326	2000 EJ_{183}	—	March 5, 2000	Socorro	LINEAR	·	4.3 km	MPC · JPL
130327	2000 EU_{189}	—	March 3, 2000	Socorro	LINEAR	·	3.2 km	MPC · JPL
130328	2000 FT_{6}	—	March 27, 2000	Kitt Peak	Spacewatch	·	4.1 km	MPC · JPL
130329	2000 FG_{11}	—	March 28, 2000	Socorro	LINEAR	·	7.6 km	MPC · JPL
130330	2000 FK_{11}	—	March 28, 2000	Socorro	LINEAR	LIX	7.8 km	MPC · JPL
130331	2000 FJ_{14}	—	March 30, 2000	Kitt Peak	Spacewatch	THM	4.4 km	MPC · JPL
130332	2000 FC_{23}	—	March 29, 2000	Socorro	LINEAR	EUP ·	7.2 km	MPC · JPL
130333	2000 FT_{23}	—	March 29, 2000	Socorro	LINEAR	·	7.4 km	MPC · JPL
130334	2000 FD_{24}	—	March 29, 2000	Socorro	LINEAR	T_{j} (2.98)	8.1 km	MPC · JPL
130335	2000 FZ_{26}	—	March 27, 2000	Anderson Mesa	LONEOS	·	5.0 km	MPC · JPL
130336	2000 FU_{27}	—	March 27, 2000	Anderson Mesa	LONEOS	EUP	6.6 km	MPC · JPL
130337	2000 FR_{29}	—	March 27, 2000	Anderson Mesa	LONEOS	·	5.6 km	MPC · JPL
130338	2000 FO_{34}	—	March 29, 2000	Socorro	LINEAR	·	7.9 km	MPC · JPL
130339	2000 FC_{39}	—	March 29, 2000	Socorro	LINEAR	·	7.7 km	MPC · JPL
130340	2000 FU_{43}	—	March 29, 2000	Socorro	LINEAR	TIR	4.5 km	MPC · JPL
130341	2000 FU_{47}	—	March 29, 2000	Socorro	LINEAR	·	5.4 km	MPC · JPL
130342	2000 FK_{53}	—	March 30, 2000	Kitt Peak	Spacewatch	CYB	6.4 km	MPC · JPL
130343	2000 FB_{56}	—	March 29, 2000	Socorro	LINEAR	TIR	4.6 km	MPC · JPL
130344	2000 FL_{57}	—	March 26, 2000	Anderson Mesa	LONEOS	EOS	3.7 km	MPC · JPL
130345	2000 FQ_{57}	—	March 26, 2000	Anderson Mesa	LONEOS	·	3.6 km	MPC · JPL
130346	2000 FA_{61}	—	March 29, 2000	Socorro	LINEAR	·	4.2 km	MPC · JPL
130347	2000 FV_{63}	—	March 29, 2000	Socorro	LINEAR	VER	5.5 km	MPC · JPL
130348	2000 FJ_{72}	—	March 25, 2000	Kitt Peak	Spacewatch	THM	2.6 km	MPC · JPL
130349	2000 FC_{73}	—	March 26, 2000	Anderson Mesa	LONEOS	·	5.6 km	MPC · JPL
130350	2000 GS_{4}	—	April 5, 2000	Socorro	LINEAR	H	1.5 km	MPC · JPL
130351	2000 GQ_{16}	—	April 5, 2000	Socorro	LINEAR	·	6.6 km	MPC · JPL
130352	2000 GU_{19}	—	April 5, 2000	Socorro	LINEAR	·	5.7 km	MPC · JPL
130353	2000 GD_{21}	—	April 5, 2000	Socorro	LINEAR	·	5.2 km	MPC · JPL
130354	2000 GF_{25}	—	April 5, 2000	Socorro	LINEAR	·	4.6 km	MPC · JPL
130355	2000 GG_{35}	—	April 5, 2000	Socorro	LINEAR	VER	6.1 km	MPC · JPL
130356	2000 GW_{43}	—	April 5, 2000	Socorro	LINEAR	·	6.0 km	MPC · JPL
130357	2000 GD_{47}	—	April 5, 2000	Socorro	LINEAR	·	4.7 km	MPC · JPL
130358	2000 GT_{61}	—	April 5, 2000	Socorro	LINEAR	URS	6.9 km	MPC · JPL
130359	2000 GQ_{65}	—	April 5, 2000	Socorro	LINEAR	·	9.5 km	MPC · JPL
130360	2000 GW_{70}	—	April 5, 2000	Socorro	LINEAR	VER	5.6 km	MPC · JPL
130361	2000 GN_{86}	—	April 4, 2000	Socorro	LINEAR	·	5.8 km	MPC · JPL
130362	2000 GY_{87}	—	April 4, 2000	Socorro	LINEAR	LIX	9.5 km	MPC · JPL
130363	2000 GH_{93}	—	April 5, 2000	Socorro	LINEAR	·	6.4 km	MPC · JPL
130364	2000 GJ_{97}	—	April 7, 2000	Socorro	LINEAR	·	6.7 km	MPC · JPL
130365	2000 GV_{100}	—	April 7, 2000	Socorro	LINEAR	·	4.5 km	MPC · JPL
130366	2000 GT_{116}	—	April 2, 2000	Kitt Peak	Spacewatch	·	4.1 km	MPC · JPL
130367	2000 GS_{118}	—	April 3, 2000	Kitt Peak	Spacewatch	·	4.7 km	MPC · JPL
130368	2000 GF_{121}	—	April 5, 2000	Kitt Peak	Spacewatch	THM	4.8 km	MPC · JPL
130369	2000 GZ_{124}	—	April 7, 2000	Socorro	LINEAR	·	9.6 km	MPC · JPL
130370	2000 GP_{129}	—	April 5, 2000	Kitt Peak	Spacewatch	·	2.5 km	MPC · JPL
130371	2000 GZ_{147}	—	April 5, 2000	Socorro	LINEAR	EOS ·	6.5 km	MPC · JPL
130372	2000 GP_{149}	—	April 5, 2000	Socorro	LINEAR	·	2.9 km	MPC · JPL
130373	2000 GU_{156}	—	April 6, 2000	Socorro	LINEAR	·	5.7 km	MPC · JPL
130374	2000 GB_{164}	—	April 12, 2000	Haleakala	NEAT	·	4.1 km	MPC · JPL
130375	2000 GX_{170}	—	April 5, 2000	Anderson Mesa	LONEOS	VER	5.3 km	MPC · JPL
130376	2000 GJ_{178}	—	April 2, 2000	Anderson Mesa	LONEOS	HYG	6.7 km	MPC · JPL
130377	2000 GJ_{183}	—	April 3, 2000	Kitt Peak	Spacewatch	VER	4.0 km	MPC · JPL
130378	2000 HR	—	April 24, 2000	Kitt Peak	Spacewatch	·	5.2 km	MPC · JPL
130379	2000 HO_{15}	—	April 29, 2000	Socorro	LINEAR	CYB	9.2 km	MPC · JPL
130380	2000 HN_{33}	—	April 30, 2000	Socorro	LINEAR	·	4.4 km	MPC · JPL
130381	2000 HR_{35}	—	April 27, 2000	Socorro	LINEAR	·	6.0 km	MPC · JPL
130382	2000 HW_{60}	—	April 25, 2000	Anderson Mesa	LONEOS	CYB	6.2 km	MPC · JPL
130383	2000 HA_{61}	—	April 25, 2000	Anderson Mesa	LONEOS	·	1.1 km	MPC · JPL
130384	2000 HB_{77}	—	April 27, 2000	Socorro	LINEAR	·	8.0 km	MPC · JPL
130385	2000 JS_{29}	—	May 7, 2000	Socorro	LINEAR	CYB	5.3 km	MPC · JPL
130386	2000 JY_{33}	—	May 7, 2000	Socorro	LINEAR	·	2.0 km	MPC · JPL
130387	2000 JJ_{40}	—	May 7, 2000	Socorro	LINEAR	·	1.3 km	MPC · JPL
130388	2000 JY_{66}	—	May 1, 2000	Haleakala	NEAT	TIR	4.8 km	MPC · JPL
130389	2000 JH_{70}	—	May 1, 2000	Anderson Mesa	LONEOS	·	3.3 km	MPC · JPL
130390	2000 JW_{70}	—	May 1, 2000	Anderson Mesa	LONEOS	·	7.1 km	MPC · JPL
130391	2000 JG_{81}	—	May 6, 2000	La Silla	La Silla	twotino	100 km	MPC · JPL
130392	2000 KM_{60}	—	May 25, 2000	Anderson Mesa	LONEOS	·	6.5 km	MPC · JPL
130393	2000 KV_{67}	—	May 30, 2000	Socorro	LINEAR	·	8.2 km	MPC · JPL
130394	2000 LL_{14}	—	June 7, 2000	Socorro	LINEAR	·	1.3 km	MPC · JPL
130395	2000 LX_{25}	—	June 11, 2000	Socorro	LINEAR	·	2.7 km	MPC · JPL
130396	2000 LD_{31}	—	June 6, 2000	Anderson Mesa	LONEOS	·	1.5 km	MPC · JPL
130397	2000 LB_{32}	—	June 5, 2000	Anderson Mesa	LONEOS	·	1.7 km	MPC · JPL
130398	2000 NR_{8}	—	July 5, 2000	Kitt Peak	Spacewatch	·	1.9 km	MPC · JPL
130399	2000 NG_{13}	—	July 5, 2000	Anderson Mesa	LONEOS	·	3.2 km	MPC · JPL
130400	2000 NP_{13}	—	July 5, 2000	Anderson Mesa	LONEOS	·	1.4 km	MPC · JPL

== 130401–130500 ==
back to top

Designation			Discovery			Properties		Ref
Permanent	Provisional	Named after	Date	Site	Discoverer(s)	Category	Diam.	Ref
130401	2000 NX_{18}	—	July 5, 2000	Anderson Mesa	LONEOS	·	1.6 km	MPC · JPL
130402	2000 OP_{6}	—	July 29, 2000	Socorro	LINEAR	·	2.2 km	MPC · JPL
130403	2000 OZ_{13}	—	July 23, 2000	Socorro	LINEAR	·	1.8 km	MPC · JPL
130404	2000 OQ_{16}	—	July 23, 2000	Socorro	LINEAR	·	1.8 km	MPC · JPL
130405	2000 OO_{17}	—	July 23, 2000	Socorro	LINEAR	·	1.8 km	MPC · JPL
130406	2000 OF_{25}	—	July 23, 2000	Socorro	LINEAR	·	10 km	MPC · JPL
130407	2000 OV_{29}	—	July 30, 2000	Socorro	LINEAR	·	3.2 km	MPC · JPL
130408	2000 ON_{32}	—	July 30, 2000	Socorro	LINEAR	·	1.4 km	MPC · JPL
130409	2000 OB_{33}	—	July 30, 2000	Socorro	LINEAR	·	3.6 km	MPC · JPL
130410	2000 OW_{40}	—	July 30, 2000	Socorro	LINEAR	·	3.0 km	MPC · JPL
130411	2000 OU_{44}	—	July 30, 2000	Socorro	LINEAR	·	2.5 km	MPC · JPL
130412	2000 OT_{45}	—	July 30, 2000	Socorro	LINEAR	·	1.5 km	MPC · JPL
130413	2000 OO_{47}	—	July 31, 2000	Socorro	LINEAR	·	2.4 km	MPC · JPL
130414	2000 OU_{51}	—	July 30, 2000	Socorro	LINEAR	V	1.7 km	MPC · JPL
130415	2000 OH_{57}	—	July 29, 2000	Anderson Mesa	LONEOS	·	2.8 km	MPC · JPL
130416	2000 OJ_{58}	—	July 29, 2000	Anderson Mesa	LONEOS	·	1.4 km	MPC · JPL
130417	2000 OR_{58}	—	July 29, 2000	Anderson Mesa	LONEOS	·	2.5 km	MPC · JPL
130418	2000 OV_{60}	—	July 29, 2000	Anderson Mesa	LONEOS	CYB	7.5 km	MPC · JPL
130419	2000 PP	—	August 1, 2000	Kitt Peak	Spacewatch	V	1.0 km	MPC · JPL
130420	2000 PB_{10}	—	August 1, 2000	Socorro	LINEAR	(2076)	1.7 km	MPC · JPL
130421	2000 PN_{11}	—	August 1, 2000	Socorro	LINEAR	·	2.4 km	MPC · JPL
130422	2000 PZ_{15}	—	August 1, 2000	Socorro	LINEAR	·	1.9 km	MPC · JPL
130423	2000 PA_{16}	—	August 1, 2000	Socorro	LINEAR	·	1.7 km	MPC · JPL
130424	2000 PV_{18}	—	August 1, 2000	Socorro	LINEAR	·	1.7 km	MPC · JPL
130425	2000 PF_{19}	—	August 1, 2000	Socorro	LINEAR	·	1.9 km	MPC · JPL
130426	2000 PT_{21}	—	August 1, 2000	Socorro	LINEAR	(2076)	1.7 km	MPC · JPL
130427	2000 PU_{21}	—	August 1, 2000	Socorro	LINEAR	·	1.6 km	MPC · JPL
130428	2000 PF_{22}	—	August 1, 2000	Socorro	LINEAR	·	1.3 km	MPC · JPL
130429	2000 PY_{22}	—	August 2, 2000	Socorro	LINEAR	·	1.5 km	MPC · JPL
130430	2000 PM_{24}	—	August 2, 2000	Socorro	LINEAR	·	1.5 km	MPC · JPL
130431	2000 PQ_{24}	—	August 2, 2000	Kitt Peak	Spacewatch	·	2.0 km	MPC · JPL
130432	2000 QM_{4}	—	August 24, 2000	Socorro	LINEAR	·	2.5 km	MPC · JPL
130433	2000 QO_{9}	—	August 26, 2000	Ondřejov	P. Pravec, P. Kušnirák	·	2.4 km	MPC · JPL
130434	2000 QU_{11}	—	August 24, 2000	Socorro	LINEAR	·	1.4 km	MPC · JPL
130435	2000 QB_{12}	—	August 24, 2000	Socorro	LINEAR	·	2.2 km	MPC · JPL
130436	2000 QY_{13}	—	August 24, 2000	Socorro	LINEAR	NYS ·	2.9 km	MPC · JPL
130437	2000 QJ_{15}	—	August 24, 2000	Socorro	LINEAR	NYS	2.0 km	MPC · JPL
130438	2000 QS_{17}	—	August 24, 2000	Socorro	LINEAR	V	1.3 km	MPC · JPL
130439	2000 QO_{18}	—	August 24, 2000	Socorro	LINEAR	NYS	2.2 km	MPC · JPL
130440	2000 QW_{18}	—	August 24, 2000	Socorro	LINEAR	·	2.1 km	MPC · JPL
130441	2000 QQ_{20}	—	August 24, 2000	Socorro	LINEAR	·	2.1 km	MPC · JPL
130442	2000 QL_{24}	—	August 25, 2000	Socorro	LINEAR	V	1.9 km	MPC · JPL
130443	2000 QC_{26}	—	August 26, 2000	Reedy Creek	J. Broughton	·	2.3 km	MPC · JPL
130444	2000 QJ_{29}	—	August 24, 2000	Socorro	LINEAR	·	1.7 km	MPC · JPL
130445	2000 QV_{31}	—	August 26, 2000	Socorro	LINEAR	·	1.5 km	MPC · JPL
130446	2000 QO_{36}	—	August 24, 2000	Socorro	LINEAR	(2076)	1.4 km	MPC · JPL
130447	2000 QZ_{42}	—	August 24, 2000	Socorro	LINEAR	·	1.6 km	MPC · JPL
130448	2000 QP_{43}	—	August 24, 2000	Socorro	LINEAR	·	1.3 km	MPC · JPL
130449	2000 QY_{48}	—	August 24, 2000	Socorro	LINEAR	·	1.4 km	MPC · JPL
130450	2000 QP_{50}	—	August 24, 2000	Socorro	LINEAR	·	2.0 km	MPC · JPL
130451	2000 QE_{56}	—	August 26, 2000	Socorro	LINEAR	·	970 m	MPC · JPL
130452	2000 QX_{56}	—	August 26, 2000	Socorro	LINEAR	·	2.3 km	MPC · JPL
130453	2000 QT_{59}	—	August 26, 2000	Socorro	LINEAR	3:2	6.9 km	MPC · JPL
130454	2000 QK_{61}	—	August 28, 2000	Socorro	LINEAR	·	2.5 km	MPC · JPL
130455	2000 QD_{63}	—	August 28, 2000	Socorro	LINEAR	·	3.8 km	MPC · JPL
130456	2000 QE_{63}	—	August 28, 2000	Socorro	LINEAR	·	1.9 km	MPC · JPL
130457	2000 QZ_{65}	—	August 28, 2000	Socorro	LINEAR	V	1.5 km	MPC · JPL
130458	2000 QG_{66}	—	August 28, 2000	Socorro	LINEAR	·	2.6 km	MPC · JPL
130459	2000 QZ_{66}	—	August 28, 2000	Socorro	LINEAR	V	1.3 km	MPC · JPL
130460	2000 QL_{67}	—	August 28, 2000	Socorro	LINEAR	·	2.3 km	MPC · JPL
130461	2000 QR_{71}	—	August 24, 2000	Socorro	LINEAR	·	1.8 km	MPC · JPL
130462	2000 QU_{73}	—	August 24, 2000	Socorro	LINEAR	·	2.3 km	MPC · JPL
130463	2000 QR_{74}	—	August 24, 2000	Socorro	LINEAR	·	4.3 km	MPC · JPL
130464	2000 QU_{77}	—	August 24, 2000	Socorro	LINEAR	NYS	1.7 km	MPC · JPL
130465	2000 QF_{78}	—	August 24, 2000	Socorro	LINEAR	·	2.9 km	MPC · JPL
130466	2000 QL_{78}	—	August 24, 2000	Socorro	LINEAR	·	2.4 km	MPC · JPL
130467	2000 QO_{78}	—	August 24, 2000	Socorro	LINEAR	·	2.0 km	MPC · JPL
130468	2000 QQ_{79}	—	August 24, 2000	Socorro	LINEAR	·	2.6 km	MPC · JPL
130469	2000 QQ_{80}	—	August 24, 2000	Socorro	LINEAR	slow	3.6 km	MPC · JPL
130470	2000 QM_{82}	—	August 24, 2000	Socorro	LINEAR	NYS	1.9 km	MPC · JPL
130471	2000 QJ_{85}	—	August 25, 2000	Socorro	LINEAR	·	1.4 km	MPC · JPL
130472	2000 QM_{85}	—	August 25, 2000	Socorro	LINEAR	·	1.7 km	MPC · JPL
130473	2000 QJ_{86}	—	August 25, 2000	Socorro	LINEAR	V	1.6 km	MPC · JPL
130474	2000 QU_{87}	—	August 25, 2000	Socorro	LINEAR	·	1.2 km	MPC · JPL
130475	2000 QC_{90}	—	August 25, 2000	Socorro	LINEAR	·	2.8 km	MPC · JPL
130476	2000 QZ_{93}	—	August 26, 2000	Socorro	LINEAR	·	1.2 km	MPC · JPL
130477	2000 QK_{94}	—	August 26, 2000	Socorro	LINEAR	·	1.3 km	MPC · JPL
130478	2000 QY_{95}	—	August 28, 2000	Socorro	LINEAR	·	1.6 km	MPC · JPL
130479	2000 QB_{97}	—	August 28, 2000	Socorro	LINEAR	·	1.5 km	MPC · JPL
130480	2000 QE_{97}	—	August 28, 2000	Socorro	LINEAR	·	1.5 km	MPC · JPL
130481	2000 QQ_{97}	—	August 28, 2000	Socorro	LINEAR	·	1.8 km	MPC · JPL
130482	2000 QX_{97}	—	August 28, 2000	Socorro	LINEAR	·	1.8 km	MPC · JPL
130483	2000 QX_{100}	—	August 28, 2000	Socorro	LINEAR	V	1.3 km	MPC · JPL
130484	2000 QY_{101}	—	August 28, 2000	Socorro	LINEAR	·	1.6 km	MPC · JPL
130485	2000 QN_{103}	—	August 28, 2000	Socorro	LINEAR	MAS	1.7 km	MPC · JPL
130486	2000 QA_{106}	—	August 28, 2000	Socorro	LINEAR	·	3.2 km	MPC · JPL
130487	2000 QJ_{112}	—	August 24, 2000	Socorro	LINEAR	·	1.3 km	MPC · JPL
130488	2000 QS_{112}	—	August 24, 2000	Socorro	LINEAR	NYS	2.2 km	MPC · JPL
130489	2000 QN_{113}	—	August 24, 2000	Socorro	LINEAR	V	1.2 km	MPC · JPL
130490	2000 QY_{116}	—	August 28, 2000	Socorro	LINEAR	·	1.5 km	MPC · JPL
130491	2000 QT_{117}	—	August 29, 2000	Črni Vrh	H. Mikuž, S. Matičič	·	1.5 km	MPC · JPL
130492	2000 QT_{118}	—	August 25, 2000	Socorro	LINEAR	·	1.7 km	MPC · JPL
130493	2000 QV_{118}	—	August 25, 2000	Socorro	LINEAR	·	2.5 km	MPC · JPL
130494	2000 QH_{120}	—	August 25, 2000	Socorro	LINEAR	·	1.4 km	MPC · JPL
130495	2000 QX_{126}	—	August 31, 2000	Socorro	LINEAR	·	2.3 km	MPC · JPL
130496	2000 QT_{127}	—	August 24, 2000	Socorro	LINEAR	·	2.8 km	MPC · JPL
130497	2000 QY_{127}	—	August 24, 2000	Socorro	LINEAR	(5)	2.0 km	MPC · JPL
130498	2000 QW_{128}	—	August 25, 2000	Socorro	LINEAR	·	1.9 km	MPC · JPL
130499	2000 QB_{129}	—	August 26, 2000	Socorro	LINEAR	·	3.2 km	MPC · JPL
130500	2000 QR_{134}	—	August 26, 2000	Socorro	LINEAR	NYS	2.6 km	MPC · JPL

== 130501–130600 ==
back to top

Designation			Discovery			Properties		Ref
Permanent	Provisional	Named after	Date	Site	Discoverer(s)	Category	Diam.	Ref
130501	2000 QK_{136}	—	August 29, 2000	Socorro	LINEAR	·	1.1 km	MPC · JPL
130502	2000 QR_{138}	—	August 31, 2000	Socorro	LINEAR	·	1.8 km	MPC · JPL
130503	2000 QC_{140}	—	August 31, 2000	Socorro	LINEAR	·	2.7 km	MPC · JPL
130504	2000 QL_{140}	—	August 31, 2000	Socorro	LINEAR	·	2.9 km	MPC · JPL
130505	2000 QQ_{141}	—	August 31, 2000	Socorro	LINEAR	NYS	3.0 km	MPC · JPL
130506	2000 QN_{144}	—	August 31, 2000	Socorro	LINEAR	·	1.3 km	MPC · JPL
130507	2000 QS_{144}	—	August 31, 2000	Socorro	LINEAR	·	2.8 km	MPC · JPL
130508	2000 QG_{145}	—	August 31, 2000	Socorro	LINEAR	V	1.5 km	MPC · JPL
130509	2000 QK_{145}	—	August 31, 2000	Socorro	LINEAR	·	2.0 km	MPC · JPL
130510	2000 QS_{151}	—	August 26, 2000	Socorro	LINEAR	·	2.4 km	MPC · JPL
130511	2000 QG_{152}	—	August 28, 2000	Socorro	LINEAR	·	2.6 km	MPC · JPL
130512	2000 QS_{154}	—	August 31, 2000	Socorro	LINEAR	·	2.1 km	MPC · JPL
130513	2000 QG_{159}	—	August 31, 2000	Socorro	LINEAR	·	1.5 km	MPC · JPL
130514	2000 QR_{163}	—	August 31, 2000	Socorro	LINEAR	·	1.6 km	MPC · JPL
130515	2000 QC_{165}	—	August 31, 2000	Socorro	LINEAR	·	2.2 km	MPC · JPL
130516	2000 QJ_{166}	—	August 31, 2000	Socorro	LINEAR	·	2.7 km	MPC · JPL
130517	2000 QW_{168}	—	August 31, 2000	Socorro	LINEAR	·	3.6 km	MPC · JPL
130518	2000 QN_{169}	—	August 31, 2000	Socorro	LINEAR	·	1.5 km	MPC · JPL
130519	2000 QQ_{172}	—	August 31, 2000	Socorro	LINEAR	·	1.9 km	MPC · JPL
130520	2000 QO_{175}	—	August 31, 2000	Socorro	LINEAR	·	1.7 km	MPC · JPL
130521	2000 QV_{180}	—	August 31, 2000	Socorro	LINEAR	·	3.3 km	MPC · JPL
130522	2000 QC_{182}	—	August 26, 2000	Socorro	LINEAR	NYS	2.7 km	MPC · JPL
130523	2000 QX_{183}	—	August 26, 2000	Socorro	LINEAR	·	1.3 km	MPC · JPL
130524	2000 QB_{189}	—	August 26, 2000	Socorro	LINEAR	·	1.7 km	MPC · JPL
130525	2000 QX_{191}	—	August 26, 2000	Socorro	LINEAR	·	1.6 km	MPC · JPL
130526	2000 QQ_{194}	—	August 31, 2000	Socorro	LINEAR	·	2.1 km	MPC · JPL
130527	2000 QW_{198}	—	August 29, 2000	Socorro	LINEAR	·	2.7 km	MPC · JPL
130528	2000 QY_{199}	—	August 29, 2000	Socorro	LINEAR	PHO · slow	3.8 km	MPC · JPL
130529	2000 QY_{200}	—	August 29, 2000	Socorro	LINEAR	·	1.6 km	MPC · JPL
130530	2000 QK_{201}	—	August 29, 2000	Socorro	LINEAR	(2076)	2.0 km	MPC · JPL
130531	2000 QY_{201}	—	August 29, 2000	Socorro	LINEAR	ERI	5.0 km	MPC · JPL
130532	2000 QB_{202}	—	August 29, 2000	Socorro	LINEAR	·	2.6 km	MPC · JPL
130533	2000 QK_{204}	—	August 29, 2000	Socorro	LINEAR	·	1.3 km	MPC · JPL
130534	2000 QX_{204}	—	August 31, 2000	Socorro	LINEAR	·	1.6 km	MPC · JPL
130535	2000 QU_{207}	—	August 31, 2000	Socorro	LINEAR	·	2.1 km	MPC · JPL
130536	2000 QV_{208}	—	August 31, 2000	Socorro	LINEAR	NYS · slow	4.0 km	MPC · JPL
130537	2000 QV_{210}	—	August 31, 2000	Socorro	LINEAR	·	1.8 km	MPC · JPL
130538	2000 QC_{213}	—	August 31, 2000	Socorro	LINEAR	·	1.5 km	MPC · JPL
130539	2000 QG_{213}	—	August 31, 2000	Socorro	LINEAR	·	2.0 km	MPC · JPL
130540	2000 QJ_{213}	—	August 31, 2000	Socorro	LINEAR	·	1.6 km	MPC · JPL
130541	2000 QJ_{215}	—	August 31, 2000	Socorro	LINEAR	·	2.7 km	MPC · JPL
130542	2000 QZ_{215}	—	August 31, 2000	Socorro	LINEAR	·	1.4 km	MPC · JPL
130543	2000 QH_{216}	—	August 31, 2000	Socorro	LINEAR	NYS	1.9 km	MPC · JPL
130544	2000 QP_{221}	—	August 21, 2000	Anderson Mesa	LONEOS	·	2.9 km	MPC · JPL
130545	2000 QK_{223}	—	August 21, 2000	Anderson Mesa	LONEOS	·	1.3 km	MPC · JPL
130546	2000 QW_{227}	—	August 31, 2000	Socorro	LINEAR	·	2.1 km	MPC · JPL
130547	2000 QX_{229}	—	August 31, 2000	Socorro	LINEAR	·	1.5 km	MPC · JPL
130548	2000 QL_{230}	—	August 31, 2000	Socorro	LINEAR	·	2.1 km	MPC · JPL
130549	2000 RT	—	September 1, 2000	Socorro	LINEAR	·	1.4 km	MPC · JPL
130550	2000 RO_{1}	—	September 1, 2000	Socorro	LINEAR	·	1.5 km	MPC · JPL
130551	2000 RV_{4}	—	September 1, 2000	Socorro	LINEAR	·	1.7 km	MPC · JPL
130552	2000 RX_{13}	—	September 1, 2000	Socorro	LINEAR	·	3.2 km	MPC · JPL
130553	2000 RV_{14}	—	September 1, 2000	Socorro	LINEAR	·	2.8 km	MPC · JPL
130554	2000 RT_{18}	—	September 1, 2000	Socorro	LINEAR	·	2.1 km	MPC · JPL
130555	2000 RR_{23}	—	September 1, 2000	Socorro	LINEAR	·	1.5 km	MPC · JPL
130556	2000 RE_{30}	—	September 1, 2000	Socorro	LINEAR	V	1.6 km	MPC · JPL
130557	2000 RB_{31}	—	September 1, 2000	Socorro	LINEAR	V	1.9 km	MPC · JPL
130558	2000 RE_{31}	—	September 1, 2000	Socorro	LINEAR	BAP	1.8 km	MPC · JPL
130559	2000 RJ_{31}	—	September 1, 2000	Socorro	LINEAR	V	1.5 km	MPC · JPL
130560	2000 RL_{32}	—	September 1, 2000	Socorro	LINEAR	·	1.9 km	MPC · JPL
130561	2000 RW_{32}	—	September 1, 2000	Socorro	LINEAR	·	1.7 km	MPC · JPL
130562	2000 RE_{33}	—	September 1, 2000	Socorro	LINEAR	·	2.7 km	MPC · JPL
130563	2000 RE_{35}	—	September 1, 2000	Socorro	LINEAR	EUN	3.8 km	MPC · JPL
130564	2000 RC_{38}	—	September 5, 2000	Kvistaberg	Uppsala-DLR Asteroid Survey	·	2.2 km	MPC · JPL
130565	2000 RH_{38}	—	September 5, 2000	Kvistaberg	Uppsala-DLR Asteroid Survey	·	1.3 km	MPC · JPL
130566	2000 RW_{38}	—	September 5, 2000	Socorro	LINEAR	·	3.2 km	MPC · JPL
130567	2000 RV_{39}	—	September 2, 2000	Socorro	LINEAR	·	1.5 km	MPC · JPL
130568	2000 RN_{41}	—	September 3, 2000	Socorro	LINEAR	·	4.7 km	MPC · JPL
130569	2000 RD_{44}	—	September 3, 2000	Socorro	LINEAR	·	3.6 km	MPC · JPL
130570	2000 RR_{45}	—	September 3, 2000	Socorro	LINEAR	·	2.6 km	MPC · JPL
130571	2000 RJ_{46}	—	September 3, 2000	Socorro	LINEAR	·	2.2 km	MPC · JPL
130572	2000 RF_{48}	—	September 3, 2000	Socorro	LINEAR	V	1.5 km	MPC · JPL
130573	2000 RZ_{55}	—	September 5, 2000	Socorro	LINEAR	·	1.6 km	MPC · JPL
130574	2000 RF_{60}	—	September 8, 2000	Desert Beaver	W. K. Y. Yeung	·	1.5 km	MPC · JPL
130575	2000 RV_{67}	—	September 1, 2000	Socorro	LINEAR	·	2.4 km	MPC · JPL
130576	2000 RK_{68}	—	September 2, 2000	Socorro	LINEAR	·	2.3 km	MPC · JPL
130577	2000 RK_{69}	—	September 2, 2000	Socorro	LINEAR	·	2.7 km	MPC · JPL
130578	2000 RO_{69}	—	September 2, 2000	Socorro	LINEAR	·	1.6 km	MPC · JPL
130579	2000 RX_{69}	—	September 2, 2000	Socorro	LINEAR	V	1.2 km	MPC · JPL
130580	2000 RO_{71}	—	September 2, 2000	Socorro	LINEAR	(5)	1.5 km	MPC · JPL
130581	2000 RQ_{71}	—	September 2, 2000	Socorro	LINEAR	·	3.3 km	MPC · JPL
130582	2000 RH_{75}	—	September 3, 2000	Socorro	LINEAR	·	3.0 km	MPC · JPL
130583	2000 RS_{75}	—	September 3, 2000	Socorro	LINEAR	·	6.3 km	MPC · JPL
130584	2000 RA_{77}	—	September 5, 2000	Socorro	LINEAR	·	2.3 km	MPC · JPL
130585	2000 RU_{77}	—	September 9, 2000	Višnjan Observatory	K. Korlević	NYS	2.7 km	MPC · JPL
130586	2000 RG_{78}	—	September 9, 2000	Farpoint	G. Hug	·	1.2 km	MPC · JPL
130587	2000 RT_{80}	—	September 1, 2000	Socorro	LINEAR	·	1.7 km	MPC · JPL
130588	2000 RD_{83}	—	September 1, 2000	Socorro	LINEAR	L5	19 km	MPC · JPL
130589	2000 RD_{85}	—	September 2, 2000	Anderson Mesa	LONEOS	·	1.8 km	MPC · JPL
130590	2000 RG_{87}	—	September 2, 2000	Anderson Mesa	LONEOS	·	1.1 km	MPC · JPL
130591	2000 RM_{87}	—	September 2, 2000	Anderson Mesa	LONEOS	·	1.0 km	MPC · JPL
130592	2000 RT_{87}	—	September 2, 2000	Anderson Mesa	LONEOS	L5	19 km	MPC · JPL
130593	2000 RX_{88}	—	September 3, 2000	Socorro	LINEAR	·	1.3 km	MPC · JPL
130594	2000 RA_{90}	—	September 3, 2000	Socorro	LINEAR	slow	1.6 km	MPC · JPL
130595	2000 RP_{90}	—	September 3, 2000	Socorro	LINEAR	·	2.4 km	MPC · JPL
130596	2000 RV_{91}	—	September 3, 2000	Socorro	LINEAR	·	2.3 km	MPC · JPL
130597	2000 RT_{93}	—	September 4, 2000	Anderson Mesa	LONEOS	·	1.7 km	MPC · JPL
130598	2000 RH_{94}	—	September 4, 2000	Anderson Mesa	LONEOS	·	1.7 km	MPC · JPL
130599	2000 RF_{95}	—	September 4, 2000	Anderson Mesa	LONEOS	·	1.7 km	MPC · JPL
130600	2000 RU_{96}	—	September 5, 2000	Anderson Mesa	LONEOS	PHO	3.5 km	MPC · JPL

== 130601–130700 ==
back to top

Designation			Discovery			Properties		Ref
Permanent	Provisional	Named after	Date	Site	Discoverer(s)	Category	Diam.	Ref
130601	2000 SD	—	September 17, 2000	Socorro	LINEAR	·	4.1 km	MPC · JPL
130602	2000 SE_{4}	—	September 21, 2000	Haleakala	NEAT	·	2.9 km	MPC · JPL
130603	2000 SE_{7}	—	September 24, 2000	Bisei SG Center	BATTeRS	·	3.4 km	MPC · JPL
130604	2000 SH_{10}	—	September 23, 2000	Desert Beaver	W. K. Y. Yeung	·	2.9 km	MPC · JPL
130605	2000 SH_{14}	—	September 23, 2000	Socorro	LINEAR	·	4.3 km	MPC · JPL
130606	2000 SV_{14}	—	September 23, 2000	Socorro	LINEAR	PHO	2.2 km	MPC · JPL
130607	2000 SY_{14}	—	September 23, 2000	Socorro	LINEAR	·	1.6 km	MPC · JPL
130608	2000 SV_{17}	—	September 23, 2000	Socorro	LINEAR	V	1.2 km	MPC · JPL
130609	2000 SE_{19}	—	September 23, 2000	Socorro	LINEAR	T_{j} (2.99) · 3:2	10 km	MPC · JPL
130610	2000 SK_{22}	—	September 20, 2000	Haleakala	NEAT	MAS	1.2 km	MPC · JPL
130611	2000 SP_{23}	—	September 26, 2000	Tebbutt	F. B. Zoltowski	NYS	2.1 km	MPC · JPL
130612	2000 SQ_{24}	—	September 26, 2000	Bisei SG Center	BATTeRS	·	1.5 km	MPC · JPL
130613	2000 SG_{29}	—	September 24, 2000	Socorro	LINEAR	·	2.0 km	MPC · JPL
130614	2000 SW_{29}	—	September 24, 2000	Socorro	LINEAR	MAS	1.7 km	MPC · JPL
130615	2000 SX_{33}	—	September 24, 2000	Socorro	LINEAR	·	2.7 km	MPC · JPL
130616	2000 SX_{34}	—	September 24, 2000	Socorro	LINEAR	·	1.3 km	MPC · JPL
130617	2000 SQ_{36}	—	September 24, 2000	Socorro	LINEAR	·	2.2 km	MPC · JPL
130618	2000 SU_{36}	—	September 24, 2000	Socorro	LINEAR	·	2.2 km	MPC · JPL
130619	2000 SY_{36}	—	September 24, 2000	Socorro	LINEAR	(5)	1.9 km	MPC · JPL
130620	2000 SJ_{38}	—	September 24, 2000	Socorro	LINEAR	·	1.4 km	MPC · JPL
130621	2000 SV_{39}	—	September 24, 2000	Socorro	LINEAR	NYS	1.8 km	MPC · JPL
130622	2000 SM_{41}	—	September 24, 2000	Socorro	LINEAR	V	1.4 km	MPC · JPL
130623	2000 SP_{41}	—	September 24, 2000	Socorro	LINEAR	·	2.3 km	MPC · JPL
130624	2000 SC_{43}	—	September 26, 2000	Črni Vrh	Mikuž, H.	·	2.0 km	MPC · JPL
130625	2000 SJ_{44}	—	September 24, 2000	Socorro	LINEAR	PHO	2.1 km	MPC · JPL
130626	2000 SO_{49}	—	September 23, 2000	Socorro	LINEAR	·	1.4 km	MPC · JPL
130627	2000 SB_{53}	—	September 24, 2000	Socorro	LINEAR	V	1.6 km	MPC · JPL
130628	2000 SG_{54}	—	September 24, 2000	Socorro	LINEAR	·	1.9 km	MPC · JPL
130629	2000 SX_{55}	—	September 24, 2000	Socorro	LINEAR	·	1.9 km	MPC · JPL
130630	2000 SB_{57}	—	September 24, 2000	Socorro	LINEAR	·	1.8 km	MPC · JPL
130631	2000 SD_{57}	—	September 24, 2000	Socorro	LINEAR	V	1.2 km	MPC · JPL
130632	2000 SN_{57}	—	September 24, 2000	Socorro	LINEAR	·	1.5 km	MPC · JPL
130633	2000 SA_{59}	—	September 24, 2000	Socorro	LINEAR	·	2.4 km	MPC · JPL
130634	2000 SP_{61}	—	September 24, 2000	Socorro	LINEAR	·	1.6 km	MPC · JPL
130635	2000 SB_{63}	—	September 24, 2000	Socorro	LINEAR	·	2.0 km	MPC · JPL
130636	2000 SC_{64}	—	September 24, 2000	Socorro	LINEAR	V	1.2 km	MPC · JPL
130637	2000 SQ_{64}	—	September 24, 2000	Socorro	LINEAR	·	3.3 km	MPC · JPL
130638	2000 SC_{66}	—	September 24, 2000	Socorro	LINEAR	·	2.4 km	MPC · JPL
130639	2000 SQ_{66}	—	September 24, 2000	Socorro	LINEAR	·	1.6 km	MPC · JPL
130640	2000 SN_{67}	—	September 24, 2000	Socorro	LINEAR	·	2.8 km	MPC · JPL
130641	2000 SP_{68}	—	September 24, 2000	Socorro	LINEAR	·	2.2 km	MPC · JPL
130642	2000 SE_{70}	—	September 24, 2000	Socorro	LINEAR	·	1.6 km	MPC · JPL
130643	2000 SD_{71}	—	September 24, 2000	Socorro	LINEAR	·	1.4 km	MPC · JPL
130644	2000 SU_{71}	—	September 24, 2000	Socorro	LINEAR	·	2.2 km	MPC · JPL
130645	2000 SC_{73}	—	September 24, 2000	Socorro	LINEAR	MAS	1.4 km	MPC · JPL
130646	2000 SW_{74}	—	September 24, 2000	Socorro	LINEAR	·	1.7 km	MPC · JPL
130647	2000 SG_{75}	—	September 24, 2000	Socorro	LINEAR	NYS	2.3 km	MPC · JPL
130648	2000 SW_{76}	—	September 24, 2000	Socorro	LINEAR	L5	10 km	MPC · JPL
130649	2000 SR_{81}	—	September 24, 2000	Socorro	LINEAR	NYS ·	4.8 km	MPC · JPL
130650	2000 SB_{83}	—	September 24, 2000	Socorro	LINEAR	·	1.9 km	MPC · JPL
130651	2000 SA_{86}	—	September 24, 2000	Socorro	LINEAR	·	4.0 km	MPC · JPL
130652	2000 SG_{86}	—	September 24, 2000	Socorro	LINEAR	·	2.7 km	MPC · JPL
130653	2000 SO_{88}	—	September 24, 2000	Socorro	LINEAR	·	1.9 km	MPC · JPL
130654	2000 SN_{94}	—	September 23, 2000	Socorro	LINEAR	·	1.7 km	MPC · JPL
130655	2000 ST_{95}	—	September 23, 2000	Socorro	LINEAR	·	1.3 km	MPC · JPL
130656	2000 SD_{97}	—	September 23, 2000	Socorro	LINEAR	·	2.2 km	MPC · JPL
130657	2000 SH_{97}	—	September 23, 2000	Socorro	LINEAR	·	2.3 km	MPC · JPL
130658	2000 SQ_{98}	—	September 23, 2000	Socorro	LINEAR	·	1.5 km	MPC · JPL
130659	2000 SY_{98}	—	September 23, 2000	Socorro	LINEAR	·	2.0 km	MPC · JPL
130660	2000 SR_{101}	—	September 24, 2000	Socorro	LINEAR	·	1.7 km	MPC · JPL
130661	2000 SG_{103}	—	September 24, 2000	Socorro	LINEAR	MAS	1.3 km	MPC · JPL
130662	2000 SM_{104}	—	September 24, 2000	Socorro	LINEAR	·	1.7 km	MPC · JPL
130663	2000 SY_{104}	—	September 24, 2000	Socorro	LINEAR	·	2.4 km	MPC · JPL
130664	2000 SZ_{106}	—	September 24, 2000	Socorro	LINEAR	·	2.3 km	MPC · JPL
130665	2000 SD_{107}	—	September 24, 2000	Socorro	LINEAR	·	1.8 km	MPC · JPL
130666	2000 SH_{109}	—	September 24, 2000	Socorro	LINEAR	·	1.9 km	MPC · JPL
130667	2000 ST_{109}	—	September 24, 2000	Socorro	LINEAR	NYS	2.2 km	MPC · JPL
130668	2000 SE_{111}	—	September 24, 2000	Socorro	LINEAR	NYS	3.4 km	MPC · JPL
130669	2000 SF_{111}	—	September 24, 2000	Socorro	LINEAR	V	1.3 km	MPC · JPL
130670	2000 ST_{111}	—	September 24, 2000	Socorro	LINEAR	NYS	2.4 km	MPC · JPL
130671	2000 SH_{113}	—	September 24, 2000	Socorro	LINEAR	·	2.3 km	MPC · JPL
130672	2000 SC_{114}	—	September 24, 2000	Socorro	LINEAR	·	1.3 km	MPC · JPL
130673	2000 SU_{114}	—	September 24, 2000	Socorro	LINEAR	·	1.5 km	MPC · JPL
130674	2000 SB_{116}	—	September 24, 2000	Socorro	LINEAR	·	3.1 km	MPC · JPL
130675	2000 SF_{117}	—	September 24, 2000	Socorro	LINEAR	·	2.5 km	MPC · JPL
130676	2000 SH_{117}	—	September 24, 2000	Socorro	LINEAR	NYS ·	2.8 km	MPC · JPL
130677	2000 ST_{117}	—	September 24, 2000	Socorro	LINEAR	·	2.2 km	MPC · JPL
130678	2000 SS_{118}	—	September 24, 2000	Socorro	LINEAR	·	4.4 km	MPC · JPL
130679	2000 SD_{119}	—	September 24, 2000	Socorro	LINEAR	·	2.2 km	MPC · JPL
130680	2000 SK_{119}	—	September 24, 2000	Socorro	LINEAR	V	1.5 km	MPC · JPL
130681	2000 SK_{121}	—	September 24, 2000	Socorro	LINEAR	·	2.8 km	MPC · JPL
130682	2000 SM_{122}	—	September 24, 2000	Socorro	LINEAR	V	1.7 km	MPC · JPL
130683	2000 SV_{123}	—	September 24, 2000	Socorro	LINEAR	·	2.5 km	MPC · JPL
130684	2000 SH_{126}	—	September 24, 2000	Socorro	LINEAR	·	1.9 km	MPC · JPL
130685	2000 SP_{127}	—	September 24, 2000	Socorro	LINEAR	ERI	4.7 km	MPC · JPL
130686	2000 SR_{128}	—	September 24, 2000	Socorro	LINEAR	·	2.0 km	MPC · JPL
130687	2000 SZ_{131}	—	September 22, 2000	Socorro	LINEAR	L5	18 km	MPC · JPL
130688	2000 SR_{136}	—	September 23, 2000	Socorro	LINEAR	·	2.5 km	MPC · JPL
130689	2000 SM_{138}	—	September 23, 2000	Socorro	LINEAR	·	2.3 km	MPC · JPL
130690	2000 SO_{140}	—	September 23, 2000	Socorro	LINEAR	·	4.3 km	MPC · JPL
130691	2000 SW_{145}	—	September 24, 2000	Socorro	LINEAR	V	1.5 km	MPC · JPL
130692	2000 SK_{148}	—	September 24, 2000	Socorro	LINEAR	NYS	2.1 km	MPC · JPL
130693	2000 SB_{149}	—	September 24, 2000	Socorro	LINEAR	·	2.5 km	MPC · JPL
130694	2000 SO_{149}	—	September 24, 2000	Socorro	LINEAR	NYS	2.0 km	MPC · JPL
130695	2000 SJ_{150}	—	September 24, 2000	Socorro	LINEAR	·	1.8 km	MPC · JPL
130696	2000 SK_{152}	—	September 24, 2000	Socorro	LINEAR	(5)	3.8 km	MPC · JPL
130697	2000 SP_{153}	—	September 24, 2000	Socorro	LINEAR	·	1.8 km	MPC · JPL
130698	2000 SW_{153}	—	September 24, 2000	Socorro	LINEAR	·	1.1 km	MPC · JPL
130699	2000 SG_{156}	—	September 24, 2000	Socorro	LINEAR	·	2.4 km	MPC · JPL
130700	2000 SA_{160}	—	September 22, 2000	Socorro	LINEAR	PHO	2.8 km	MPC · JPL

== 130701–130800 ==
back to top

Designation			Discovery			Properties		Ref
Permanent	Provisional	Named after	Date	Site	Discoverer(s)	Category	Diam.	Ref
130701	2000 SG_{168}	—	September 23, 2000	Socorro	LINEAR	·	2.7 km	MPC · JPL
130702	2000 ST_{169}	—	September 24, 2000	Socorro	LINEAR	NYS	1.6 km	MPC · JPL
130703	2000 SH_{170}	—	September 24, 2000	Socorro	LINEAR	·	2.5 km	MPC · JPL
130704	2000 SH_{176}	—	September 28, 2000	Socorro	LINEAR	·	2.2 km	MPC · JPL
130705	2000 SF_{178}	—	September 28, 2000	Socorro	LINEAR	PHO	2.3 km	MPC · JPL
130706	2000 SP_{179}	—	September 28, 2000	Socorro	LINEAR	·	4.1 km	MPC · JPL
130707	2000 ST_{179}	—	September 28, 2000	Socorro	LINEAR	·	2.8 km	MPC · JPL
130708	2000 SE_{186}	—	September 21, 2000	Kitt Peak	Spacewatch	·	1.3 km	MPC · JPL
130709	2000 SR_{186}	—	September 21, 2000	Haleakala	NEAT	PHO	2.2 km	MPC · JPL
130710	2000 SN_{187}	—	September 21, 2000	Haleakala	NEAT	·	2.3 km	MPC · JPL
130711	2000 SR_{191}	—	September 24, 2000	Kitt Peak	Spacewatch	NYS	2.5 km	MPC · JPL
130712	2000 SP_{193}	—	September 24, 2000	Socorro	LINEAR	·	1.6 km	MPC · JPL
130713	2000 SQ_{195}	—	September 24, 2000	Socorro	LINEAR	·	1.3 km	MPC · JPL
130714	2000 SR_{198}	—	September 24, 2000	Socorro	LINEAR	NYS	2.4 km	MPC · JPL
130715	2000 SV_{203}	—	September 24, 2000	Socorro	LINEAR	·	1.6 km	MPC · JPL
130716	2000 SL_{206}	—	September 24, 2000	Socorro	LINEAR	·	1.3 km	MPC · JPL
130717	2000 SN_{207}	—	September 24, 2000	Socorro	LINEAR	·	2.1 km	MPC · JPL
130718	2000 SM_{209}	—	September 25, 2000	Socorro	LINEAR	·	2.3 km	MPC · JPL
130719	2000 SZ_{210}	—	September 25, 2000	Socorro	LINEAR	·	2.6 km	MPC · JPL
130720	2000 SQ_{212}	—	September 25, 2000	Socorro	LINEAR	V	1.1 km	MPC · JPL
130721	2000 SB_{213}	—	September 25, 2000	Socorro	LINEAR	·	1.8 km	MPC · JPL
130722	2000 SS_{214}	—	September 26, 2000	Socorro	LINEAR	·	2.0 km	MPC · JPL
130723	2000 SO_{216}	—	September 26, 2000	Socorro	LINEAR	·	1.5 km	MPC · JPL
130724	2000 SH_{218}	—	September 26, 2000	Socorro	LINEAR	·	3.0 km	MPC · JPL
130725	2000 SJ_{218}	—	September 26, 2000	Socorro	LINEAR	V	1.2 km	MPC · JPL
130726	2000 SE_{223}	—	September 27, 2000	Socorro	LINEAR	·	1.9 km	MPC · JPL
130727	2000 SM_{223}	—	September 27, 2000	Socorro	LINEAR	·	2.3 km	MPC · JPL
130728	2000 SJ_{224}	—	September 27, 2000	Socorro	LINEAR	·	1.7 km	MPC · JPL
130729	2000 SK_{227}	—	September 27, 2000	Socorro	LINEAR	·	1.9 km	MPC · JPL
130730	2000 SO_{227}	—	September 27, 2000	Socorro	LINEAR	V	1.4 km	MPC · JPL
130731	2000 SF_{230}	—	September 28, 2000	Socorro	LINEAR	·	2.0 km	MPC · JPL
130732	2000 SQ_{230}	—	September 28, 2000	Socorro	LINEAR	NYS	1.8 km	MPC · JPL
130733	2000 SU_{231}	—	September 24, 2000	Socorro	LINEAR	PHO	2.5 km	MPC · JPL
130734	2000 SW_{233}	—	September 21, 2000	Socorro	LINEAR	(5)	2.8 km	MPC · JPL
130735	2000 SC_{236}	—	September 24, 2000	Socorro	LINEAR	·	2.8 km	MPC · JPL
130736	2000 ST_{241}	—	September 24, 2000	Socorro	LINEAR	V	1.5 km	MPC · JPL
130737	2000 SU_{241}	—	September 24, 2000	Socorro	LINEAR	·	1.9 km	MPC · JPL
130738	2000 SJ_{246}	—	September 24, 2000	Socorro	LINEAR	·	3.5 km	MPC · JPL
130739	2000 SK_{247}	—	September 24, 2000	Socorro	LINEAR	PHO	1.7 km	MPC · JPL
130740	2000 SH_{251}	—	September 24, 2000	Socorro	LINEAR	·	1.4 km	MPC · JPL
130741	2000 SZ_{253}	—	September 24, 2000	Socorro	LINEAR	·	1.2 km	MPC · JPL
130742	2000 SA_{256}	—	September 24, 2000	Socorro	LINEAR	V	1.6 km	MPC · JPL
130743	2000 SQ_{256}	—	September 24, 2000	Socorro	LINEAR	·	2.3 km	MPC · JPL
130744	2000 SH_{259}	—	September 24, 2000	Socorro	LINEAR	·	1.9 km	MPC · JPL
130745	2000 ST_{259}	—	September 24, 2000	Socorro	LINEAR	V	1.4 km	MPC · JPL
130746	2000 SF_{260}	—	September 24, 2000	Socorro	LINEAR	·	1.8 km	MPC · JPL
130747	2000 SV_{260}	—	September 24, 2000	Socorro	LINEAR	·	2.1 km	MPC · JPL
130748	2000 ST_{264}	—	September 26, 2000	Socorro	LINEAR	V	1.1 km	MPC · JPL
130749	2000 SP_{265}	—	September 26, 2000	Socorro	LINEAR	·	2.2 km	MPC · JPL
130750	2000 SV_{267}	—	September 27, 2000	Socorro	LINEAR	·	1.7 km	MPC · JPL
130751	2000 SH_{274}	—	September 28, 2000	Socorro	LINEAR	V	1.1 km	MPC · JPL
130752	2000 SP_{274}	—	September 28, 2000	Socorro	LINEAR	·	1.4 km	MPC · JPL
130753	2000 SA_{275}	—	September 28, 2000	Socorro	LINEAR	V	1.2 km	MPC · JPL
130754	2000 SV_{275}	—	September 28, 2000	Socorro	LINEAR	·	1.8 km	MPC · JPL
130755	2000 SX_{275}	—	September 28, 2000	Socorro	LINEAR	·	1.9 km	MPC · JPL
130756	2000 SB_{276}	—	September 28, 2000	Socorro	LINEAR	·	2.2 km	MPC · JPL
130757	2000 SL_{277}	—	September 30, 2000	Socorro	LINEAR	·	2.4 km	MPC · JPL
130758	2000 SM_{277}	—	September 30, 2000	Socorro	LINEAR	EUN	2.8 km	MPC · JPL
130759	2000 SX_{278}	—	September 30, 2000	Socorro	LINEAR	NYS	2.3 km	MPC · JPL
130760	2000 SD_{279}	—	September 30, 2000	Socorro	LINEAR	PHO	3.2 km	MPC · JPL
130761	2000 SW_{281}	—	September 23, 2000	Socorro	LINEAR	V	1.3 km	MPC · JPL
130762	2000 SV_{285}	—	September 24, 2000	Socorro	LINEAR	·	2.5 km	MPC · JPL
130763	2000 SV_{288}	—	September 27, 2000	Socorro	LINEAR	·	1.4 km	MPC · JPL
130764	2000 SM_{298}	—	September 28, 2000	Socorro	LINEAR	·	2.3 km	MPC · JPL
130765	2000 SX_{299}	—	September 28, 2000	Socorro	LINEAR	·	1.4 km	MPC · JPL
130766	2000 SJ_{301}	—	September 28, 2000	Socorro	LINEAR	·	2.8 km	MPC · JPL
130767	2000 SR_{307}	—	September 30, 2000	Socorro	LINEAR	V	1.5 km	MPC · JPL
130768	2000 SV_{308}	—	September 30, 2000	Socorro	LINEAR	·	1.9 km	MPC · JPL
130769	2000 SA_{314}	—	September 27, 2000	Socorro	LINEAR	PHO	2.6 km	MPC · JPL
130770	2000 SS_{321}	—	September 28, 2000	Kitt Peak	Spacewatch	MAS	1.4 km	MPC · JPL
130771	2000 SU_{324}	—	September 28, 2000	Kitt Peak	Spacewatch	PHO	2.8 km	MPC · JPL
130772	2000 SD_{326}	—	September 29, 2000	Kitt Peak	Spacewatch	·	2.3 km	MPC · JPL
130773	2000 SH_{326}	—	September 29, 2000	Kitt Peak	Spacewatch	·	2.4 km	MPC · JPL
130774	2000 SX_{329}	—	September 27, 2000	Socorro	LINEAR	NYS	1.9 km	MPC · JPL
130775	2000 SB_{335}	—	September 26, 2000	Haleakala	NEAT	·	1.9 km	MPC · JPL
130776	2000 SB_{348}	—	September 21, 2000	Socorro	LINEAR	PHO	5.0 km	MPC · JPL
130777	2000 SA_{364}	—	September 20, 2000	Socorro	LINEAR	·	1.5 km	MPC · JPL
130778	2000 SX_{369}	—	September 24, 2000	Anderson Mesa	LONEOS	V · slow	1.5 km	MPC · JPL
130779	2000 TQ_{1}	—	October 3, 2000	Prescott	P. G. Comba	ADE	4.2 km	MPC · JPL
130780	2000 TH_{3}	—	October 1, 2000	Socorro	LINEAR	V	1.1 km	MPC · JPL
130781	2000 TF_{4}	—	October 1, 2000	Socorro	LINEAR	MAS	1.3 km	MPC · JPL
130782	2000 TH_{6}	—	October 1, 2000	Socorro	LINEAR	MAS	1.4 km	MPC · JPL
130783	2000 TD_{11}	—	October 1, 2000	Socorro	LINEAR	·	1.5 km	MPC · JPL
130784	2000 TF_{11}	—	October 1, 2000	Socorro	LINEAR	·	1.4 km	MPC · JPL
130785	2000 TM_{12}	—	October 1, 2000	Socorro	LINEAR	V	1.3 km	MPC · JPL
130786	2000 TH_{16}	—	October 1, 2000	Socorro	LINEAR	·	2.0 km	MPC · JPL
130787	2000 TE_{17}	—	October 1, 2000	Socorro	LINEAR	·	1.4 km	MPC · JPL
130788	2000 TY_{18}	—	October 1, 2000	Socorro	LINEAR	·	1.6 km	MPC · JPL
130789	2000 TT_{19}	—	October 1, 2000	Socorro	LINEAR	V	1.3 km	MPC · JPL
130790	2000 TW_{20}	—	October 1, 2000	Socorro	LINEAR	·	1.3 km	MPC · JPL
130791	2000 TQ_{26}	—	October 2, 2000	Socorro	LINEAR	·	2.7 km	MPC · JPL
130792	2000 TW_{27}	—	October 3, 2000	Socorro	LINEAR	·	2.2 km	MPC · JPL
130793	2000 TL_{31}	—	October 4, 2000	Kitt Peak	Spacewatch	·	1.3 km	MPC · JPL
130794	2000 TH_{34}	—	October 6, 2000	Anderson Mesa	LONEOS	·	2.6 km	MPC · JPL
130795	2000 TS_{38}	—	October 1, 2000	Socorro	LINEAR	·	1.7 km	MPC · JPL
130796	2000 TQ_{39}	—	October 1, 2000	Socorro	LINEAR	V	1.5 km	MPC · JPL
130797	2000 TW_{39}	—	October 1, 2000	Socorro	LINEAR	·	2.4 km	MPC · JPL
130798	2000 TQ_{41}	—	October 1, 2000	Socorro	LINEAR	·	1.4 km	MPC · JPL
130799	2000 TL_{43}	—	October 1, 2000	Socorro	LINEAR	·	1.5 km	MPC · JPL
130800	2000 TT_{45}	—	October 1, 2000	Socorro	LINEAR	·	1.5 km	MPC · JPL

== 130801–130900 ==
back to top

Designation			Discovery			Properties		Ref
Permanent	Provisional	Named after	Date	Site	Discoverer(s)	Category	Diam.	Ref
130801	2000 TO_{49}	—	October 1, 2000	Socorro	LINEAR	·	3.1 km	MPC · JPL
130802	2000 TX_{51}	—	October 1, 2000	Socorro	LINEAR	·	2.6 km	MPC · JPL
130803	2000 TS_{52}	—	October 1, 2000	Socorro	LINEAR	·	1.8 km	MPC · JPL
130804	2000 TE_{55}	—	October 1, 2000	Socorro	LINEAR	·	4.4 km	MPC · JPL
130805	2000 TU_{62}	—	October 2, 2000	Socorro	LINEAR	·	2.4 km	MPC · JPL
130806	2000 TB_{66}	—	October 1, 2000	Socorro	LINEAR	·	2.6 km	MPC · JPL
130807	2000 TY_{67}	—	October 3, 2000	Socorro	LINEAR	·	2.4 km	MPC · JPL
130808	2000 UU	—	October 21, 2000	Višnjan Observatory	K. Korlević	·	1.5 km	MPC · JPL
130809	2000 UJ_{5}	—	October 24, 2000	Socorro	LINEAR	slow	2.0 km	MPC · JPL
130810	2000 UN_{5}	—	October 24, 2000	Socorro	LINEAR	·	1.4 km	MPC · JPL
130811	2000 UH_{6}	—	October 24, 2000	Socorro	LINEAR	·	1.3 km	MPC · JPL
130812	2000 UP_{6}	—	October 24, 2000	Socorro	LINEAR	·	2.2 km	MPC · JPL
130813	2000 UM_{8}	—	October 24, 2000	Socorro	LINEAR	PHO	1.7 km	MPC · JPL
130814	2000 UW_{8}	—	October 24, 2000	Socorro	LINEAR	EUN	3.2 km	MPC · JPL
130815	2000 UD_{9}	—	October 24, 2000	Socorro	LINEAR	·	2.7 km	MPC · JPL
130816	2000 UJ_{9}	—	October 24, 2000	Socorro	LINEAR	MAS	1.7 km	MPC · JPL
130817	2000 UU_{9}	—	October 24, 2000	Socorro	LINEAR	·	2.3 km	MPC · JPL
130818	2000 UM_{13}	—	October 23, 2000	Višnjan Observatory	K. Korlević	·	3.4 km	MPC · JPL
130819	2000 UQ_{14}	—	October 25, 2000	Socorro	LINEAR	·	2.0 km	MPC · JPL
130820	2000 UH_{17}	—	October 24, 2000	Socorro	LINEAR	·	2.6 km	MPC · JPL
130821	2000 UT_{19}	—	October 29, 2000	Kitt Peak	Spacewatch	·	1.9 km	MPC · JPL
130822	2000 UD_{20}	—	October 24, 2000	Socorro	LINEAR	·	1.3 km	MPC · JPL
130823	2000 UJ_{22}	—	October 24, 2000	Socorro	LINEAR	(5)	2.2 km	MPC · JPL
130824	2000 UQ_{25}	—	October 24, 2000	Socorro	LINEAR	·	3.9 km	MPC · JPL
130825	2000 UV_{25}	—	October 24, 2000	Socorro	LINEAR	·	2.4 km	MPC · JPL
130826	2000 UT_{28}	—	October 30, 2000	Socorro	LINEAR	NYS	2.1 km	MPC · JPL
130827	2000 UB_{34}	—	October 24, 2000	Socorro	LINEAR	·	2.2 km	MPC · JPL
130828	2000 UL_{36}	—	October 24, 2000	Socorro	LINEAR	NYS	2.1 km	MPC · JPL
130829	2000 UX_{36}	—	October 24, 2000	Socorro	LINEAR	NYS	2.1 km	MPC · JPL
130830	2000 UJ_{40}	—	October 24, 2000	Socorro	LINEAR	V	1.3 km	MPC · JPL
130831	2000 UL_{43}	—	October 24, 2000	Socorro	LINEAR	MAS	1.3 km	MPC · JPL
130832	2000 UG_{44}	—	October 24, 2000	Socorro	LINEAR	·	2.3 km	MPC · JPL
130833	2000 UH_{44}	—	October 24, 2000	Socorro	LINEAR	·	1.8 km	MPC · JPL
130834	2000 US_{44}	—	October 24, 2000	Socorro	LINEAR	·	1.7 km	MPC · JPL
130835	2000 US_{46}	—	October 24, 2000	Socorro	LINEAR	·	1.2 km	MPC · JPL
130836	2000 UJ_{47}	—	October 24, 2000	Socorro	LINEAR	·	1.4 km	MPC · JPL
130837	2000 UU_{47}	—	October 24, 2000	Socorro	LINEAR	·	2.4 km	MPC · JPL
130838	2000 UY_{47}	—	October 24, 2000	Socorro	LINEAR	·	1.9 km	MPC · JPL
130839	2000 UY_{50}	—	October 24, 2000	Socorro	LINEAR	·	2.6 km	MPC · JPL
130840	2000 UN_{51}	—	October 24, 2000	Socorro	LINEAR	NYS	1.8 km	MPC · JPL
130841	2000 UG_{52}	—	October 24, 2000	Socorro	LINEAR	·	2.1 km	MPC · JPL
130842	2000 UY_{54}	—	October 24, 2000	Socorro	LINEAR	·	1.4 km	MPC · JPL
130843	2000 UP_{60}	—	October 25, 2000	Socorro	LINEAR	NYS	1.8 km	MPC · JPL
130844	2000 UL_{61}	—	October 25, 2000	Socorro	LINEAR	EUN	2.0 km	MPC · JPL
130845	2000 UQ_{62}	—	October 25, 2000	Socorro	LINEAR	·	3.8 km	MPC · JPL
130846	2000 UL_{63}	—	October 25, 2000	Socorro	LINEAR	·	2.9 km	MPC · JPL
130847	2000 UB_{64}	—	October 25, 2000	Socorro	LINEAR	·	2.1 km	MPC · JPL
130848	2000 UF_{64}	—	October 25, 2000	Socorro	LINEAR	·	1.4 km	MPC · JPL
130849	2000 UU_{64}	—	October 25, 2000	Socorro	LINEAR	·	2.5 km	MPC · JPL
130850	2000 UU_{66}	—	October 25, 2000	Socorro	LINEAR	·	2.4 km	MPC · JPL
130851	2000 UO_{68}	—	October 25, 2000	Socorro	LINEAR	NYS	1.6 km	MPC · JPL
130852	2000 UR_{68}	—	October 25, 2000	Socorro	LINEAR	·	1.8 km	MPC · JPL
130853	2000 UW_{68}	—	October 25, 2000	Socorro	LINEAR	·	2.0 km	MPC · JPL
130854	2000 UD_{73}	—	October 25, 2000	Socorro	LINEAR	·	2.0 km	MPC · JPL
130855	2000 UX_{73}	—	October 26, 2000	Socorro	LINEAR	V	1.5 km	MPC · JPL
130856	2000 UZ_{73}	—	October 26, 2000	Socorro	LINEAR	·	2.7 km	MPC · JPL
130857	2000 UV_{77}	—	October 23, 2000	Višnjan Observatory	K. Korlević	(5)	2.2 km	MPC · JPL
130858	2000 UJ_{79}	—	October 24, 2000	Socorro	LINEAR	·	2.9 km	MPC · JPL
130859	2000 UO_{81}	—	October 24, 2000	Socorro	LINEAR	·	3.8 km	MPC · JPL
130860	2000 UY_{82}	—	October 30, 2000	Socorro	LINEAR	·	2.5 km	MPC · JPL
130861	2000 UH_{85}	—	October 31, 2000	Socorro	LINEAR	V	1.1 km	MPC · JPL
130862	2000 US_{86}	—	October 31, 2000	Socorro	LINEAR	·	2.5 km	MPC · JPL
130863	2000 UB_{103}	—	October 25, 2000	Socorro	LINEAR	·	3.4 km	MPC · JPL
130864	2000 UD_{103}	—	October 25, 2000	Socorro	LINEAR	EUN	3.3 km	MPC · JPL
130865	2000 UJ_{107}	—	October 30, 2000	Socorro	LINEAR	·	1.2 km	MPC · JPL
130866	2000 UO_{109}	—	October 31, 2000	Socorro	LINEAR	·	4.4 km	MPC · JPL
130867	2000 US_{110}	—	October 25, 2000	Socorro	LINEAR	·	3.0 km	MPC · JPL
130868	2000 VZ	—	November 1, 2000	Kitt Peak	Spacewatch	·	1.7 km	MPC · JPL
130869	2000 VH_{1}	—	November 1, 2000	Socorro	LINEAR	·	2.8 km	MPC · JPL
130870	2000 VK_{1}	—	November 1, 2000	Socorro	LINEAR	·	3.1 km	MPC · JPL
130871	2000 VG_{2}	—	November 1, 2000	Socorro	LINEAR	·	3.3 km	MPC · JPL
130872	2000 VQ_{2}	—	November 1, 2000	Ondřejov	P. Kušnirák	(5)	2.1 km	MPC · JPL
130873	2000 VR_{2}	—	November 1, 2000	Ondřejov	P. Pravec, P. Kušnirák	·	1.5 km	MPC · JPL
130874	2000 VK_{3}	—	November 1, 2000	Desert Beaver	W. K. Y. Yeung	·	1.9 km	MPC · JPL
130875	2000 VN_{3}	—	November 1, 2000	Socorro	LINEAR	·	2.2 km	MPC · JPL
130876	2000 VU_{4}	—	November 1, 2000	Socorro	LINEAR	·	2.3 km	MPC · JPL
130877	2000 VT_{7}	—	November 1, 2000	Socorro	LINEAR	·	2.3 km	MPC · JPL
130878	2000 VM_{13}	—	November 1, 2000	Socorro	LINEAR	V	1.4 km	MPC · JPL
130879	2000 VP_{13}	—	November 1, 2000	Socorro	LINEAR	·	2.1 km	MPC · JPL
130880	2000 VV_{13}	—	November 1, 2000	Socorro	LINEAR	·	2.6 km	MPC · JPL
130881	2000 VX_{13}	—	November 1, 2000	Socorro	LINEAR	V	1.4 km	MPC · JPL
130882	2000 VN_{15}	—	November 1, 2000	Socorro	LINEAR	·	2.0 km	MPC · JPL
130883	2000 VU_{15}	—	November 1, 2000	Socorro	LINEAR	·	1.1 km	MPC · JPL
130884	2000 VY_{17}	—	November 1, 2000	Socorro	LINEAR	·	2.4 km	MPC · JPL
130885	2000 VV_{21}	—	November 1, 2000	Socorro	LINEAR	·	2.7 km	MPC · JPL
130886	2000 VO_{22}	—	November 1, 2000	Socorro	LINEAR	·	2.1 km	MPC · JPL
130887	2000 VB_{23}	—	November 1, 2000	Socorro	LINEAR	·	2.0 km	MPC · JPL
130888	2000 VU_{23}	—	November 1, 2000	Socorro	LINEAR	NYS	2.1 km	MPC · JPL
130889	2000 VX_{23}	—	November 1, 2000	Socorro	LINEAR	(6769)	2.2 km	MPC · JPL
130890	2000 VE_{24}	—	November 1, 2000	Socorro	LINEAR	·	2.8 km	MPC · JPL
130891	2000 VP_{24}	—	November 1, 2000	Socorro	LINEAR	·	2.5 km	MPC · JPL
130892	2000 VV_{24}	—	November 1, 2000	Socorro	LINEAR	·	2.3 km	MPC · JPL
130893	2000 VA_{27}	—	November 1, 2000	Socorro	LINEAR	NYS	1.7 km	MPC · JPL
130894	2000 VC_{28}	—	November 1, 2000	Socorro	LINEAR	·	2.2 km	MPC · JPL
130895	2000 VM_{28}	—	November 1, 2000	Socorro	LINEAR	·	1.7 km	MPC · JPL
130896	2000 VY_{28}	—	November 1, 2000	Socorro	LINEAR	·	2.5 km	MPC · JPL
130897	2000 VS_{30}	—	November 1, 2000	Socorro	LINEAR	·	1.7 km	MPC · JPL
130898	2000 VQ_{31}	—	November 1, 2000	Socorro	LINEAR	V	1.4 km	MPC · JPL
130899	2000 VG_{32}	—	November 1, 2000	Socorro	LINEAR	NYS	1.9 km	MPC · JPL
130900	2000 VH_{32}	—	November 1, 2000	Socorro	LINEAR	·	3.1 km	MPC · JPL

== 130901–131000 ==
back to top

Designation			Discovery			Properties		Ref
Permanent	Provisional	Named after	Date	Site	Discoverer(s)	Category	Diam.	Ref
130901	2000 VB_{33}	—	November 1, 2000	Socorro	LINEAR	·	4.7 km	MPC · JPL
130902	2000 VW_{33}	—	November 1, 2000	Socorro	LINEAR	·	2.5 km	MPC · JPL
130903	2000 VE_{35}	—	November 1, 2000	Socorro	LINEAR	·	3.2 km	MPC · JPL
130904	2000 VH_{39}	—	November 2, 2000	Socorro	LINEAR	BAR	2.8 km	MPC · JPL
130905	2000 VO_{39}	—	November 1, 2000	Socorro	LINEAR	·	3.3 km	MPC · JPL
130906	2000 VD_{42}	—	November 1, 2000	Socorro	LINEAR	·	2.6 km	MPC · JPL
130907	2000 VQ_{44}	—	November 2, 2000	Socorro	LINEAR	·	3.2 km	MPC · JPL
130908	2000 VH_{45}	—	November 1, 2000	Socorro	LINEAR	·	2.5 km	MPC · JPL
130909	2000 VG_{46}	—	November 3, 2000	Socorro	LINEAR	KON	3.5 km	MPC · JPL
130910	2000 VU_{53}	—	November 3, 2000	Socorro	LINEAR	·	2.2 km	MPC · JPL
130911	2000 VK_{54}	—	November 3, 2000	Socorro	LINEAR	V	1.4 km	MPC · JPL
130912	2000 VJ_{56}	—	November 3, 2000	Socorro	LINEAR	NYS	1.5 km	MPC · JPL
130913	2000 VX_{62}	—	November 6, 2000	Socorro	LINEAR	HNS	2.7 km	MPC · JPL
130914	2000 WY	—	November 17, 2000	Kitt Peak	Spacewatch	V	1.1 km	MPC · JPL
130915	2000 WO_{2}	—	November 18, 2000	Desert Beaver	W. K. Y. Yeung	(5)	2.9 km	MPC · JPL
130916	2000 WY_{4}	—	November 19, 2000	Socorro	LINEAR	HNS	3.0 km	MPC · JPL
130917	2000 WE_{8}	—	November 20, 2000	Socorro	LINEAR	·	2.0 km	MPC · JPL
130918	2000 WP_{8}	—	November 20, 2000	Socorro	LINEAR	·	2.5 km	MPC · JPL
130919	2000 WU_{8}	—	November 20, 2000	Socorro	LINEAR	·	2.8 km	MPC · JPL
130920	2000 WL_{11}	—	November 24, 2000	Elmira	Cecce, A. J.	·	2.8 km	MPC · JPL
130921	2000 WF_{15}	—	November 20, 2000	Socorro	LINEAR	ADE	4.0 km	MPC · JPL
130922	2000 WK_{15}	—	November 20, 2000	Socorro	LINEAR	·	2.0 km	MPC · JPL
130923	2000 WB_{16}	—	November 21, 2000	Socorro	LINEAR	·	1.5 km	MPC · JPL
130924	2000 WH_{17}	—	November 21, 2000	Socorro	LINEAR	·	2.2 km	MPC · JPL
130925	2000 WY_{17}	—	November 21, 2000	Socorro	LINEAR	·	2.4 km	MPC · JPL
130926	2000 WF_{19}	—	November 25, 2000	Fountain Hills	C. W. Juels	·	5.8 km	MPC · JPL
130927	2000 WM_{22}	—	November 20, 2000	Socorro	LINEAR	·	2.1 km	MPC · JPL
130928	2000 WN_{25}	—	November 21, 2000	Socorro	LINEAR	V	1.3 km	MPC · JPL
130929	2000 WA_{26}	—	November 21, 2000	Socorro	LINEAR	·	2.4 km	MPC · JPL
130930	2000 WR_{26}	—	November 25, 2000	Socorro	LINEAR	V	1.1 km	MPC · JPL
130931	2000 WF_{29}	—	November 20, 2000	Socorro	LINEAR	·	4.6 km	MPC · JPL
130932	2000 WP_{29}	—	November 21, 2000	Socorro	LINEAR	PHO	2.3 km	MPC · JPL
130933	2000 WL_{31}	—	November 20, 2000	Socorro	LINEAR	·	3.8 km	MPC · JPL
130934	2000 WA_{32}	—	November 20, 2000	Socorro	LINEAR	·	2.1 km	MPC · JPL
130935	2000 WL_{35}	—	November 20, 2000	Socorro	LINEAR	·	2.0 km	MPC · JPL
130936	2000 WD_{40}	—	November 20, 2000	Socorro	LINEAR	·	3.4 km	MPC · JPL
130937	2000 WM_{40}	—	November 20, 2000	Socorro	LINEAR	(5)	3.0 km	MPC · JPL
130938	2000 WK_{41}	—	November 20, 2000	Socorro	LINEAR	·	2.6 km	MPC · JPL
130939	2000 WR_{41}	—	November 20, 2000	Socorro	LINEAR	·	4.3 km	MPC · JPL
130940	2000 WE_{43}	—	November 21, 2000	Socorro	LINEAR	·	4.0 km	MPC · JPL
130941	2000 WY_{43}	—	November 21, 2000	Socorro	LINEAR	·	2.2 km	MPC · JPL
130942	2000 WB_{50}	—	November 26, 2000	Socorro	LINEAR	V	1.1 km	MPC · JPL
130943	2000 WY_{51}	—	November 27, 2000	Kitt Peak	Spacewatch	·	2.4 km	MPC · JPL
130944	2000 WK_{54}	—	November 20, 2000	Socorro	LINEAR	·	1.7 km	MPC · JPL
130945	2000 WC_{55}	—	November 20, 2000	Socorro	LINEAR	·	2.9 km	MPC · JPL
130946	2000 WT_{61}	—	November 21, 2000	Socorro	LINEAR	·	2.4 km	MPC · JPL
130947	2000 WP_{62}	—	November 20, 2000	Anderson Mesa	LONEOS	HNS	1.9 km	MPC · JPL
130948	2000 WM_{66}	—	November 20, 2000	Socorro	LINEAR	·	3.5 km	MPC · JPL
130949	2000 WQ_{66}	—	November 21, 2000	Socorro	LINEAR	·	1.6 km	MPC · JPL
130950	2000 WS_{72}	—	November 20, 2000	Socorro	LINEAR	·	2.5 km	MPC · JPL
130951	2000 WQ_{74}	—	November 20, 2000	Socorro	LINEAR	·	2.0 km	MPC · JPL
130952	2000 WB_{76}	—	November 20, 2000	Socorro	LINEAR	·	2.9 km	MPC · JPL
130953	2000 WT_{79}	—	November 20, 2000	Socorro	LINEAR	fast	1.7 km	MPC · JPL
130954	2000 WL_{81}	—	November 20, 2000	Socorro	LINEAR	·	1.9 km	MPC · JPL
130955	2000 WT_{90}	—	November 21, 2000	Socorro	LINEAR	·	2.7 km	MPC · JPL
130956	2000 WE_{95}	—	November 21, 2000	Socorro	LINEAR	LEO	4.2 km	MPC · JPL
130957	2000 WS_{95}	—	November 21, 2000	Socorro	LINEAR	(5)	2.1 km	MPC · JPL
130958	2000 WD_{96}	—	November 21, 2000	Socorro	LINEAR	(5)	2.4 km	MPC · JPL
130959	2000 WF_{96}	—	November 21, 2000	Socorro	LINEAR	NYS	2.0 km	MPC · JPL
130960	2000 WS_{97}	—	November 21, 2000	Socorro	LINEAR	NYS	3.2 km	MPC · JPL
130961	2000 WV_{98}	—	November 21, 2000	Socorro	LINEAR	·	2.5 km	MPC · JPL
130962	2000 WX_{98}	—	November 21, 2000	Socorro	LINEAR	MAS	1.0 km	MPC · JPL
130963	2000 WD_{101}	—	November 21, 2000	Socorro	LINEAR	ADE	6.3 km	MPC · JPL
130964	2000 WW_{101}	—	November 26, 2000	Socorro	LINEAR	PHO	3.5 km	MPC · JPL
130965	2000 WK_{106}	—	November 29, 2000	Haleakala	NEAT	·	1.6 km	MPC · JPL
130966	2000 WA_{112}	—	November 20, 2000	Socorro	LINEAR	·	2.3 km	MPC · JPL
130967	2000 WX_{112}	—	November 20, 2000	Socorro	LINEAR	fast	2.2 km	MPC · JPL
130968	2000 WC_{113}	—	November 20, 2000	Socorro	LINEAR	·	2.4 km	MPC · JPL
130969	2000 WC_{114}	—	November 20, 2000	Socorro	LINEAR	EUN	2.0 km	MPC · JPL
130970	2000 WD_{114}	—	November 20, 2000	Socorro	LINEAR	NYS	2.1 km	MPC · JPL
130971	2000 WP_{114}	—	November 20, 2000	Socorro	LINEAR	NYS ·	4.9 km	MPC · JPL
130972	2000 WB_{116}	—	November 20, 2000	Socorro	LINEAR	·	3.5 km	MPC · JPL
130973	2000 WS_{116}	—	November 20, 2000	Socorro	LINEAR	·	2.2 km	MPC · JPL
130974	2000 WX_{116}	—	November 20, 2000	Socorro	LINEAR	·	2.4 km	MPC · JPL
130975	2000 WB_{118}	—	November 20, 2000	Socorro	LINEAR	EUN	2.2 km	MPC · JPL
130976	2000 WW_{118}	—	November 20, 2000	Socorro	LINEAR	·	2.1 km	MPC · JPL
130977	2000 WO_{123}	—	November 29, 2000	Socorro	LINEAR	·	2.2 km	MPC · JPL
130978	2000 WN_{125}	—	November 29, 2000	Socorro	LINEAR	·	3.0 km	MPC · JPL
130979	2000 WF_{126}	—	November 30, 2000	Socorro	LINEAR	·	3.0 km	MPC · JPL
130980	2000 WJ_{126}	—	November 30, 2000	Socorro	LINEAR	·	4.2 km	MPC · JPL
130981	2000 WX_{126}	—	November 16, 2000	Kitt Peak	Spacewatch	·	2.7 km	MPC · JPL
130982	2000 WH_{130}	—	November 19, 2000	Kitt Peak	Spacewatch	·	4.1 km	MPC · JPL
130983	2000 WM_{130}	—	November 20, 2000	Anderson Mesa	LONEOS	PHO	1.8 km	MPC · JPL
130984	2000 WA_{133}	—	November 19, 2000	Socorro	LINEAR	·	2.8 km	MPC · JPL
130985	2000 WX_{133}	—	November 19, 2000	Socorro	LINEAR	PHO	2.5 km	MPC · JPL
130986	2000 WD_{138}	—	November 21, 2000	Socorro	LINEAR	·	1.7 km	MPC · JPL
130987	2000 WO_{140}	—	November 21, 2000	Socorro	LINEAR	·	3.2 km	MPC · JPL
130988	2000 WT_{141}	—	November 19, 2000	Socorro	LINEAR	·	4.3 km	MPC · JPL
130989	2000 WL_{142}	—	November 20, 2000	Anderson Mesa	LONEOS	·	2.6 km	MPC · JPL
130990	2000 WF_{153}	—	November 29, 2000	Socorro	LINEAR	·	2.6 km	MPC · JPL
130991	2000 WC_{158}	—	November 30, 2000	Socorro	LINEAR	·	3.0 km	MPC · JPL
130992	2000 WT_{159}	—	November 20, 2000	Anderson Mesa	LONEOS	·	4.2 km	MPC · JPL
130993	2000 WZ_{159}	—	November 20, 2000	Anderson Mesa	LONEOS	·	2.3 km	MPC · JPL
130994	2000 WA_{162}	—	November 20, 2000	Anderson Mesa	LONEOS	·	2.5 km	MPC · JPL
130995	2000 WZ_{166}	—	November 24, 2000	Anderson Mesa	LONEOS	·	2.0 km	MPC · JPL
130996	2000 WE_{167}	—	November 24, 2000	Anderson Mesa	LONEOS	·	2.5 km	MPC · JPL
130997	2000 WS_{167}	—	November 24, 2000	Anderson Mesa	LONEOS	·	1.3 km	MPC · JPL
130998	2000 WY_{170}	—	November 24, 2000	Anderson Mesa	LONEOS	V	1.6 km	MPC · JPL
130999	2000 WU_{172}	—	November 25, 2000	Socorro	LINEAR	PHO	2.3 km	MPC · JPL
131000	2000 WL_{178}	—	November 28, 2000	Kitt Peak	Spacewatch	·	2.5 km	MPC · JPL

back to top

== See also ==
- Meanings of minor-planet names: 130001–131000
