= Meanings of minor-planet names: 130001–131000 =

As minor planet discoveries are confirmed, they are given a permanent number by the IAU's Minor Planet Center (MPC), and the discoverers can then submit names for them, following the IAU's naming conventions. The list below concerns those minor planets in the specified number-range that have received names, and explains the meanings of those names.

Official naming citations of newly named small Solar System bodies are approved and published in a bulletin by IAU's Working Group for Small Bodies Nomenclature (WGSBN). Before May 2021, citations were published in MPC's Minor Planet Circulars for many decades. Recent citations can also be found on the JPL Small-Body Database (SBDB). Until his death in 2016, German astronomer Lutz D. Schmadel compiled these citations into the Dictionary of Minor Planet Names (DMP) and regularly updated the collection.

Based on Paul Herget's The Names of the Minor Planets, Schmadel also researched the unclear origin of numerous asteroids, most of which had been named prior to World War II. This article incorporates text from this source, which is in the public domain: SBDB New namings may only be added to this list below after official publication as the preannouncement of names is condemned. The WGSBN publishes a comprehensive guideline for the naming rules of non-cometary small Solar System bodies.

== 130001–130100 ==
Named minor planet	Provisional	This minor planet was named for...	Ref · Catalog
130006 Imranaslam	1999 VB_{45}	Imran Aslam (born 1977), electronics lead for the OSIRIS-REx asteroid sample-return mission's laser altimeter at MDA. Prior to this, he was the Lead for the Mars Curiosity Rover's Alpha Particle X-ray Spectrometer, and Electronics Lead for the Metrology sensors on the Phoenix Mars Lander	JPL · 130006
130007 Frankteti	1999 VC_{45}	Frank Teti (born 1966), program manager for the development of the OSIRIS-REx asteroid sample-return mission's laser altimeter. Prior to this, he was the Manager of Autonomous Robotics at MDA and focused on commercial and civilian missions for lunar exploration/exploitation and orbital debris removal	JPL · 130007
130066 Timhaltigin	1999 VK_{193}	Timothy Haltigin (born 1976), the Senior Mission Scientist in Planetary Exploration at the Canadian Space Agency. He is actively involved in the preparatory stages for a variety of planetary sample return missions, and is the Mission Manager for the OSIRIS-REx asteroid sample-return mission's laser altimeter.	JPL · 130066
130067 Marius-Phaneuf	1999 VM_{194}	Rene-Pier Marius-Phaneuf (born 1971), a Senior Project Manager at the Canadian Space Agency. He is responsible for the delivery of the OLA instrument to the OSIRIS-REx asteroid sample-return mission. He has been involved in the Canadian contributions to Herschel (HIFI), the Mars Science Laboratory (APXS) and JWST (FGS-NIRISS)	JPL · 130067
130069 Danielgaudreau	1999 VV_{196}	Daniel Gaudreau (born 1969), the lead systems engineer for the OSIRIS-REx asteroid sample-return mission's laser altimeter.	JPL · 130069
130071 Claudebrunet	1999 VD_{198}	Claude Brunet (born 1956), flight software manager at the Canadian Space Agency. He oversaw the development of the OSIRIS-REx asteroid sample-return mission's laser altimeter, of the Alpha Particle X-ray Spectrometer currently on MSL (member of the MSL Operation team), and of the Phoenix Meteorological Station instrument	JPL · 130071
130072 Ilincaignat	1999 VL_{198}	Luminita Ilinca Ignat (born 1968), a deputy project manager at the Canadian Space Agency for the OSIRIS-REx asteroid sample-return mission's laser altimeter. Prior to serving in this role, she was the CSA Deputy Project Manager for the James Webb Space Telescope Fine Guidance Sensor/Near InfraRed Imager and Slitless Spectrograph	JPL · 130072
130078 Taschner	1999 WH_{2}	Rudolf Taschner, professor of mathematics at the Technical University of Vienna	JPL · 130078
130088 Grantcunningham	1999 XQ_{3}	Grant Cunningham (born 1959) specialized in lidar from Graduate School at York University through 25 years of involvement at Optech Incorporated where he is a Senior Scientist with a speciality in sensor calibration. He is the Optech technical lead for the OSIRIS-REx asteroid sample-return mission's laser altimeter.	JPL · 130088
130089 Saadatanwar	1999 XC_{5}	Saadat Anwar (born 1972), the GSE & Software Lead for the OTES instrument on the OSIRIS-REx asteroid sample-return mission. He leads a team of Software Engineers at the Mars Space Flight Facility, and has developed targeting & analysis software for the LRO, MRO, Mars Odyssey, MER and MGS missions	JPL · 130089
130090 Heatherbowles	1999 XJ_{6}	Heather Bowles (born 1989), the configuration manager for the Thermal Emission Spectrometer Instrument on the OSIRIS-REx asteroid sample-return mission	JPL · 130090

== 130101–130200 ==
back to top

Named minor planet	Provisional	This minor planet was named for...	Ref · Catalog
130126 Stillmanchase	1999 XW_{106}	Stillman Chase (born 1932), systems engineer for the OTES instrument on OSIRIS-REx asteroid sample-return mission. He was an instrument Co-Investigator on Mariners 2, 6, 7, 9 and 10, Vikings 1 & 2, Pioneers 10 & 11 and Mars Global Surveyor. Chase was an instrument Principal Investigator on Mariner 10	JPL · 130126
130127 Zoltanfarkas	1999 XC_{110}	Zoltan Farkas (born 1975), mechanical engineer for the OTES instrument on the OSIRIS-REx asteroid sample-return mission. He has designed and fabricated components to enhance electron-microscopes, flight hardware for Mini-TES, THEMIS instruments, and ultra-high pressure instrumentations for ALVIN submersible	JPL · 130127
130128 Tarafisher	1999 XG_{118}	Tara Fisher (born 1968), program administrator for the Thermal Emission Spectrometer Instrument on the OSIRIS-REx asteroid sample-return mission	JPL · 130128
130158 Orsonjohn	1999 XD_{231}	Orson John (born 1987), member of the Safety and Mission Assurance team of the OSIRIS-REx asteroid sample-return mission serving as the reliability engineer for OTES as well as serving in a similar role on MAVEN and ATLAS. He is now serving as a quality engineer for the ATLAS/ ICESat-2 mission during Integration and Testing	JPL · 130158
130161 Iankubik	1999 XG_{237}	Ian Kubik (born 1988), mechanical engineer for the OTES instrument on the OSIRIS-REx asteroid sample-return mission. This is his first major engineering role since graduating from Arizona State University	JPL · 130161

== 130201–130300 ==
back to top

Named minor planet	Provisional	This minor planet was named for...	Ref · Catalog
130229 Igorlazbin	2000 BV_{33}	Igor Lazbin (born 1965), the Controls Lead for the OTES instrument on the OSIRIS-REx asteroid sample-return mission. He was the Guidance Navigation and Controls Lead on several NASA and Air Force spacecraft projects and developed controls solutions for a variety of spacecraft applications	JPL · 130229
130249 Markminer	2000 CS_{106}	Mark Miner (born 1985), thermal engineer on the Thermal Emission Spectrometer Instrument on the OSIRIS-REx asteroid sample-return mission	JPL · 130249
130283 Elizabethgraham	2000 EB_{8}	Elizabeth Brady and Graham Lawrence Brady, the parents of New Zealand discoverer Nigel Brady. They were instrumental in recognizing and encouraging the discoverer's early interest in science and particularly astronomy, for which the discoverer is eternally grateful.	JPL · 130283

== 130301–130400 ==
back to top

Named minor planet	Provisional	This minor planet was named for...	Ref · Catalog
130314 Williamodonnell	2000 EU_{121}	William O'Donnel (born 1952), mechanical engineer on the Thermal Emission Spectrometer Instrument on the OSIRIS-REx asteroid sample-return mission	JPL · 130314
130319 Danielpelham	2000 EX_{140}	Daniel Pelham (born 1960), lead opto-mechanical engineer for the OTES instrument on the OSIRIS-REx asteroid sample-return mission. He was a senior member of the technical staff at Santa Barbara Remote Sensing where he helped develop a wide range of earth and planetary instruments	JPL · 130319
130320 Maherrassas	2000 EL_{141}	Maher Rassas (born 1951), mission assurance engineer on the Thermal Emission Spectrometer Instrument on the OSIRIS-REx asteroid sample-return mission	JPL · 130320

== 130401–130500 ==
back to top

Named minor planet	Provisional	This minor planet was named for...	Ref · Catalog
There are no named minor planets in this number range

== 130501–130600 ==
back to top

Named minor planet	Provisional	This minor planet was named for...	Ref · Catalog
There are no named minor planets in this number range

== 130601–130700 ==
back to top

Named minor planet	Provisional	This minor planet was named for...	Ref · Catalog
There are no named minor planets in this number range

== 130701–130800 ==
back to top

Named minor planet	Provisional	This minor planet was named for...	Ref · Catalog
There are no named minor planets in this number range

== 130801–130900 ==
back to top

Named minor planet	Provisional	This minor planet was named for...	Ref · Catalog
There are no named minor planets in this number range

== 130901–131000 ==
back to top

Named minor planet	Provisional	This minor planet was named for...	Ref · Catalog
There are no named minor planets in this number range

back to top

Preceded by 129,001–130,000	Meanings of minor-planet names List of minor planets: 130,001–131,000	Succeeded by 131,001–132,000
