= List of minor planets: 131001–132000 =

The following is a partial list of minor planets, running from minor-planet number 131001 through 132000, inclusive. The primary data for this and other partial lists is based on JPL's "Small-Body Orbital Elements" and data available from the Minor Planet Center. Critical list information is also provided by the MPC, unless otherwise specified from Lowell Observatory. A detailed description of the table's columns and additional sources are given on the main page including a complete list of every page in this series, and a statistical break-up on the dynamical classification of minor planets.

Also see the summary list of all named bodies in numerical and alphabetical order, and the corresponding naming citations for the number range of this particular list. New namings may only be added to this list after official publication, as the preannouncement of names is condemned by the Working Group for Small Bodies Nomenclature of the International Astronomical Union.

Near-Earth obj.	MBA (inner)	MBA (outer)	Centaur
Mars-crosser	MBA (middle)	Jupiter trojan	Trans-Neptunian obj.
Unclassified

== 131001–131100 ==
Designation			Discovery			Properties		Ref
Permanent	Provisional	Named after	Date	Site	Discoverer(s)	Category	Diam.	Ref
131001	2000 WJ_{180}	—	November 27, 2000	Socorro	LINEAR	·	1.8 km	MPC · JPL
131002	2000 WP_{188}	—	November 18, 2000	Anderson Mesa	LONEOS	·	1.5 km	MPC · JPL
131003	2000 WC_{192}	—	November 19, 2000	Anderson Mesa	LONEOS	·	2.5 km	MPC · JPL
131004	2000 WT_{195}	—	November 19, 2000	Kitt Peak	Spacewatch	·	2.2 km	MPC · JPL
131005	2000 XF_{2}	—	December 3, 2000	Desert Beaver	W. K. Y. Yeung	(5)	3.0 km	MPC · JPL
131006	2000 XW_{3}	—	December 1, 2000	Socorro	LINEAR	·	4.2 km	MPC · JPL
131007	2000 XL_{8}	—	December 1, 2000	Socorro	LINEAR	·	4.8 km	MPC · JPL
131008	2000 XM_{8}	—	December 1, 2000	Socorro	LINEAR	·	3.4 km	MPC · JPL
131009	2000 XP_{9}	—	December 1, 2000	Socorro	LINEAR	·	3.0 km	MPC · JPL
131010	2000 XQ_{9}	—	December 1, 2000	Socorro	LINEAR	JUN	2.2 km	MPC · JPL
131011	2000 XA_{10}	—	December 1, 2000	Socorro	LINEAR	·	3.5 km	MPC · JPL
131012	2000 XJ_{10}	—	December 1, 2000	Socorro	LINEAR	·	3.2 km	MPC · JPL
131013	2000 XM_{10}	—	December 1, 2000	Socorro	LINEAR	MAR	2.2 km	MPC · JPL
131014	2000 XG_{13}	—	December 4, 2000	Socorro	LINEAR	·	1.7 km	MPC · JPL
131015	2000 XV_{15}	—	December 1, 2000	Socorro	LINEAR	·	2.9 km	MPC · JPL
131016	2000 XX_{25}	—	December 4, 2000	Socorro	LINEAR	·	3.9 km	MPC · JPL
131017	2000 XR_{26}	—	December 4, 2000	Socorro	LINEAR	·	2.4 km	MPC · JPL
131018	2000 XA_{27}	—	December 4, 2000	Socorro	LINEAR	ADE	3.8 km	MPC · JPL
131019	2000 XC_{31}	—	December 4, 2000	Socorro	LINEAR	·	1.9 km	MPC · JPL
131020	2000 XG_{32}	—	December 4, 2000	Socorro	LINEAR	(194)	3.9 km	MPC · JPL
131021	2000 XR_{33}	—	December 4, 2000	Socorro	LINEAR	ADE	5.2 km	MPC · JPL
131022	2000 XQ_{37}	—	December 5, 2000	Socorro	LINEAR	·	4.6 km	MPC · JPL
131023	2000 XK_{38}	—	December 5, 2000	Socorro	LINEAR	·	4.9 km	MPC · JPL
131024	2000 XD_{39}	—	December 4, 2000	Socorro	LINEAR	EUN	2.6 km	MPC · JPL
131025	2000 XO_{39}	—	December 4, 2000	Socorro	LINEAR	·	4.9 km	MPC · JPL
131026	2000 XE_{41}	—	December 5, 2000	Socorro	LINEAR	·	2.9 km	MPC · JPL
131027	2000 XP_{42}	—	December 5, 2000	Socorro	LINEAR	·	2.6 km	MPC · JPL
131028	2000 XQ_{42}	—	December 5, 2000	Socorro	LINEAR	EUN	2.3 km	MPC · JPL
131029	2000 XV_{42}	—	December 5, 2000	Socorro	LINEAR	(194)	4.7 km	MPC · JPL
131030	2000 XG_{46}	—	December 5, 2000	Socorro	LINEAR	BRU	4.6 km	MPC · JPL
131031	2000 XU_{46}	—	December 7, 2000	Socorro	LINEAR	EUN	2.9 km	MPC · JPL
131032	2000 XQ_{48}	—	December 4, 2000	Socorro	LINEAR	·	3.5 km	MPC · JPL
131033	2000 XG_{50}	—	December 4, 2000	Socorro	LINEAR	·	3.5 km	MPC · JPL
131034	2000 XZ_{52}	—	December 6, 2000	Socorro	LINEAR	·	3.1 km	MPC · JPL
131035	2000 XV_{53}	—	December 5, 2000	Uccle	T. Pauwels	·	2.0 km	MPC · JPL
131036	2000 YE	—	December 16, 2000	Socorro	LINEAR	PHO	2.1 km	MPC · JPL
131037	2000 YN	—	December 16, 2000	Socorro	LINEAR	HNS	2.6 km	MPC · JPL
131038	2000 YP	—	December 16, 2000	Socorro	LINEAR	·	3.8 km	MPC · JPL
131039	2000 YO_{2}	—	December 17, 2000	Socorro	LINEAR	·	2.6 km	MPC · JPL
131040	2000 YM_{8}	—	December 16, 2000	Uccle	T. Pauwels	NYS	2.2 km	MPC · JPL
131041	2000 YA_{13}	—	December 24, 2000	Haleakala	NEAT	slow	2.3 km	MPC · JPL
131042	2000 YF_{16}	—	December 23, 2000	Desert Beaver	W. K. Y. Yeung	·	3.0 km	MPC · JPL
131043	2000 YU_{25}	—	December 22, 2000	Socorro	LINEAR	·	3.3 km	MPC · JPL
131044	2000 YB_{26}	—	December 23, 2000	Socorro	LINEAR	(5)	2.6 km	MPC · JPL
131045	2000 YH_{32}	—	December 30, 2000	Socorro	LINEAR	·	1.5 km	MPC · JPL
131046	2000 YX_{32}	—	December 30, 2000	Socorro	LINEAR	·	1.4 km	MPC · JPL
131047	2000 YB_{35}	—	December 28, 2000	Socorro	LINEAR	·	5.2 km	MPC · JPL
131048	2000 YM_{38}	—	December 30, 2000	Socorro	LINEAR	·	2.4 km	MPC · JPL
131049	2000 YP_{38}	—	December 30, 2000	Socorro	LINEAR	·	1.7 km	MPC · JPL
131050	2000 YF_{48}	—	December 30, 2000	Socorro	LINEAR	NYS	2.7 km	MPC · JPL
131051	2000 YK_{48}	—	December 30, 2000	Socorro	LINEAR	·	2.6 km	MPC · JPL
131052	2000 YW_{48}	—	December 30, 2000	Socorro	LINEAR	V	1.2 km	MPC · JPL
131053	2000 YY_{50}	—	December 30, 2000	Socorro	LINEAR	·	2.1 km	MPC · JPL
131054	2000 YA_{53}	—	December 30, 2000	Socorro	LINEAR	(5)	2.2 km	MPC · JPL
131055	2000 YP_{54}	—	December 30, 2000	Socorro	LINEAR	·	4.1 km	MPC · JPL
131056	2000 YU_{54}	—	December 30, 2000	Socorro	LINEAR	·	5.1 km	MPC · JPL
131057	2000 YG_{56}	—	December 30, 2000	Socorro	LINEAR	·	4.0 km	MPC · JPL
131058	2000 YE_{58}	—	December 30, 2000	Socorro	LINEAR	MAS	1.6 km	MPC · JPL
131059	2000 YP_{59}	—	December 30, 2000	Socorro	LINEAR	(5)	2.7 km	MPC · JPL
131060	2000 YB_{62}	—	December 30, 2000	Socorro	LINEAR	·	2.2 km	MPC · JPL
131061	2000 YG_{62}	—	December 30, 2000	Socorro	LINEAR	·	3.9 km	MPC · JPL
131062	2000 YG_{69}	—	December 30, 2000	Socorro	LINEAR	(5)	2.0 km	MPC · JPL
131063	2000 YP_{69}	—	December 30, 2000	Socorro	LINEAR	(5)	2.3 km	MPC · JPL
131064	2000 YA_{70}	—	December 30, 2000	Socorro	LINEAR	·	1.9 km	MPC · JPL
131065	2000 YS_{75}	—	December 30, 2000	Socorro	LINEAR	·	3.1 km	MPC · JPL
131066	2000 YF_{77}	—	December 30, 2000	Socorro	LINEAR	slow	2.7 km	MPC · JPL
131067	2000 YO_{78}	—	December 30, 2000	Socorro	LINEAR	·	2.6 km	MPC · JPL
131068	2000 YT_{79}	—	December 30, 2000	Socorro	LINEAR	·	2.4 km	MPC · JPL
131069	2000 YD_{83}	—	December 30, 2000	Socorro	LINEAR	·	2.7 km	MPC · JPL
131070	2000 YY_{85}	—	December 30, 2000	Socorro	LINEAR	·	2.4 km	MPC · JPL
131071	2000 YR_{89}	—	December 30, 2000	Socorro	LINEAR	·	2.4 km	MPC · JPL
131072	2000 YH_{91}	—	December 30, 2000	Socorro	LINEAR	MAS	1.4 km	MPC · JPL
131073	2000 YQ_{91}	—	December 30, 2000	Socorro	LINEAR	·	2.8 km	MPC · JPL
131074	2000 YZ_{92}	—	December 30, 2000	Socorro	LINEAR	·	2.1 km	MPC · JPL
131075	2000 YP_{94}	—	December 30, 2000	Socorro	LINEAR	·	2.7 km	MPC · JPL
131076	2000 YC_{103}	—	December 28, 2000	Socorro	LINEAR	·	2.4 km	MPC · JPL
131077	2000 YH_{105}	—	December 28, 2000	Socorro	LINEAR	fast	3.9 km	MPC · JPL
131078	2000 YL_{106}	—	December 30, 2000	Socorro	LINEAR	NYS	2.8 km	MPC · JPL
131079	2000 YG_{110}	—	December 30, 2000	Socorro	LINEAR	·	2.6 km	MPC · JPL
131080	2000 YC_{111}	—	December 30, 2000	Socorro	LINEAR	·	2.6 km	MPC · JPL
131081	2000 YG_{119}	—	December 29, 2000	Anderson Mesa	LONEOS	·	2.3 km	MPC · JPL
131082	2000 YG_{121}	—	December 21, 2000	Socorro	LINEAR	EUN	3.0 km	MPC · JPL
131083	2000 YV_{122}	—	December 28, 2000	Socorro	LINEAR	·	4.5 km	MPC · JPL
131084	2000 YE_{123}	—	December 28, 2000	Socorro	LINEAR	·	4.7 km	MPC · JPL
131085	2000 YL_{124}	—	December 29, 2000	Anderson Mesa	LONEOS	NYS ·	2.8 km	MPC · JPL
131086	2000 YT_{126}	—	December 29, 2000	Anderson Mesa	LONEOS	EUN	2.8 km	MPC · JPL
131087	2000 YM_{127}	—	December 29, 2000	Haleakala	NEAT	·	2.4 km	MPC · JPL
131088	2000 YZ_{131}	—	December 30, 2000	Socorro	LINEAR	·	3.4 km	MPC · JPL
131089	2000 YY_{134}	—	December 17, 2000	Anderson Mesa	LONEOS	EUN	2.6 km	MPC · JPL
131090	2000 YY_{136}	—	December 23, 2000	Socorro	LINEAR	·	2.6 km	MPC · JPL
131091	2000 YG_{140}	—	December 31, 2000	Anderson Mesa	LONEOS	MAR	2.8 km	MPC · JPL
131092	2000 YP_{142}	—	December 30, 2000	Socorro	LINEAR	·	2.0 km	MPC · JPL
131093	2000 YV_{142}	—	December 31, 2000	Anderson Mesa	LONEOS	BRU	5.4 km	MPC · JPL
131094	2001 AQ_{3}	—	January 2, 2001	Socorro	LINEAR	·	2.2 km	MPC · JPL
131095	2001 AW_{3}	—	January 2, 2001	Socorro	LINEAR	·	2.4 km	MPC · JPL
131096	2001 AT_{5}	—	January 2, 2001	Socorro	LINEAR	·	2.0 km	MPC · JPL
131097	2001 AG_{8}	—	January 2, 2001	Socorro	LINEAR	·	2.4 km	MPC · JPL
131098	2001 AL_{13}	—	January 2, 2001	Socorro	LINEAR	·	3.5 km	MPC · JPL
131099	2001 AP_{13}	—	January 2, 2001	Socorro	LINEAR	·	5.1 km	MPC · JPL
131100	2001 AB_{20}	—	January 2, 2001	Socorro	LINEAR	·	4.6 km	MPC · JPL

== 131101–131200 ==
back to top

Designation			Discovery			Properties		Ref
Permanent	Provisional	Named after	Date	Site	Discoverer(s)	Category	Diam.	Ref
131101	2001 AA_{21}	—	January 3, 2001	Socorro	LINEAR	V	1.1 km	MPC · JPL
131102	2001 AB_{24}	—	January 3, 2001	Socorro	LINEAR	·	2.4 km	MPC · JPL
131103	2001 AS_{26}	—	January 5, 2001	Socorro	LINEAR	·	3.8 km	MPC · JPL
131104	2001 AN_{28}	—	January 5, 2001	Socorro	LINEAR	·	2.5 km	MPC · JPL
131105	2001 AV_{28}	—	January 4, 2001	Socorro	LINEAR	NYS	2.4 km	MPC · JPL
131106	2001 AN_{29}	—	January 4, 2001	Socorro	LINEAR	·	3.0 km	MPC · JPL
131107	2001 AV_{30}	—	January 4, 2001	Socorro	LINEAR	EUN	2.3 km	MPC · JPL
131108	2001 AO_{32}	—	January 4, 2001	Socorro	LINEAR	·	2.2 km	MPC · JPL
131109	2001 AA_{33}	—	January 4, 2001	Socorro	LINEAR	(5)	2.1 km	MPC · JPL
131110	2001 AS_{34}	—	January 4, 2001	Socorro	LINEAR	(5)	3.0 km	MPC · JPL
131111	2001 AN_{35}	—	January 5, 2001	Socorro	LINEAR	GEF ·	5.2 km	MPC · JPL
131112	2001 AQ_{35}	—	January 5, 2001	Socorro	LINEAR	EUN	2.9 km	MPC · JPL
131113	2001 AO_{45}	—	January 15, 2001	Socorro	LINEAR	·	2.2 km	MPC · JPL
131114	2001 AY_{48}	—	January 15, 2001	Socorro	LINEAR	·	5.1 km	MPC · JPL
131115	2001 BN	—	January 17, 2001	Oizumi	T. Kobayashi	·	3.7 km	MPC · JPL
131116	2001 BS	—	January 17, 2001	Oizumi	T. Kobayashi	·	1.9 km	MPC · JPL
131117	2001 BC_{1}	—	January 16, 2001	Haleakala	NEAT	RAF	2.3 km	MPC · JPL
131118	2001 BA_{4}	—	January 18, 2001	Socorro	LINEAR	·	3.6 km	MPC · JPL
131119	2001 BK_{4}	—	January 18, 2001	Socorro	LINEAR	PHO	5.3 km	MPC · JPL
131120	2001 BY_{4}	—	January 18, 2001	Socorro	LINEAR	EUN	2.5 km	MPC · JPL
131121	2001 BS_{7}	—	January 19, 2001	Socorro	LINEAR	·	3.3 km	MPC · JPL
131122	2001 BG_{11}	—	January 19, 2001	Kitt Peak	Spacewatch	·	2.0 km	MPC · JPL
131123	2001 BO_{22}	—	January 20, 2001	Socorro	LINEAR	·	2.8 km	MPC · JPL
131124	2001 BT_{22}	—	January 20, 2001	Socorro	LINEAR	·	2.6 km	MPC · JPL
131125	2001 BD_{24}	—	January 20, 2001	Socorro	LINEAR	·	4.4 km	MPC · JPL
131126	2001 BD_{28}	—	January 20, 2001	Socorro	LINEAR	·	3.1 km	MPC · JPL
131127	2001 BJ_{31}	—	January 20, 2001	Socorro	LINEAR	·	2.3 km	MPC · JPL
131128	2001 BX_{31}	—	January 20, 2001	Socorro	LINEAR	·	2.1 km	MPC · JPL
131129	2001 BE_{36}	—	January 19, 2001	Socorro	LINEAR	·	3.5 km	MPC · JPL
131130	2001 BH_{36}	—	January 19, 2001	Socorro	LINEAR	·	2.3 km	MPC · JPL
131131	2001 BL_{36}	—	January 19, 2001	Socorro	LINEAR	GEF	2.6 km	MPC · JPL
131132	2001 BW_{36}	—	January 21, 2001	Socorro	LINEAR	·	2.1 km	MPC · JPL
131133	2001 BA_{41}	—	January 24, 2001	Socorro	LINEAR	·	3.8 km	MPC · JPL
131134	2001 BD_{44}	—	January 19, 2001	Socorro	LINEAR	·	2.6 km	MPC · JPL
131135	2001 BW_{46}	—	January 21, 2001	Socorro	LINEAR	·	3.9 km	MPC · JPL
131136	2001 BT_{47}	—	January 21, 2001	Socorro	LINEAR	·	2.6 km	MPC · JPL
131137	2001 BC_{50}	—	January 21, 2001	Socorro	LINEAR	·	5.0 km	MPC · JPL
131138	2001 BV_{50}	—	January 28, 2001	Oizumi	T. Kobayashi	·	3.9 km	MPC · JPL
131139	2001 BE_{52}	—	January 17, 2001	Kitt Peak	Spacewatch	·	2.9 km	MPC · JPL
131140	2001 BV_{52}	—	January 17, 2001	Haleakala	NEAT	EUN	2.8 km	MPC · JPL
131141	2001 BX_{53}	—	January 18, 2001	Haleakala	NEAT	RAF	2.1 km	MPC · JPL
131142	2001 BF_{57}	—	January 20, 2001	Socorro	LINEAR	·	2.6 km	MPC · JPL
131143	2001 BM_{62}	—	January 26, 2001	Socorro	LINEAR	·	4.2 km	MPC · JPL
131144	2001 BF_{63}	—	January 29, 2001	Socorro	LINEAR	·	4.6 km	MPC · JPL
131145	2001 BZ_{72}	—	January 27, 2001	Haleakala	NEAT	·	5.8 km	MPC · JPL
131146	2001 BN_{73}	—	January 29, 2001	Haleakala	NEAT	EUN	2.1 km	MPC · JPL
131147	2001 BD_{75}	—	January 31, 2001	Haleakala	NEAT	·	3.2 km	MPC · JPL
131148	2001 BM_{79}	—	January 21, 2001	Socorro	LINEAR	·	2.3 km	MPC · JPL
131149	2001 BF_{80}	—	January 21, 2001	Socorro	LINEAR	·	2.7 km	MPC · JPL
131150	2001 BE_{82}	—	January 31, 2001	Socorro	LINEAR	EUN	2.7 km	MPC · JPL
131151	2001 CD_{7}	—	February 1, 2001	Socorro	LINEAR	·	4.0 km	MPC · JPL
131152	2001 CH_{9}	—	February 1, 2001	Socorro	LINEAR	·	2.8 km	MPC · JPL
131153	2001 CV_{9}	—	February 2, 2001	Oaxaca	Roe, J. M.	·	3.5 km	MPC · JPL
131154	2001 CZ_{9}	—	February 3, 2001	Piera	Guarro, J.	·	2.7 km	MPC · JPL
131155	2001 CC_{10}	—	February 2, 2001	Farpoint	G. Hug	·	2.5 km	MPC · JPL
131156	2001 CK_{14}	—	February 1, 2001	Socorro	LINEAR	·	4.2 km	MPC · JPL
131157	2001 CH_{16}	—	February 1, 2001	Socorro	LINEAR	·	4.0 km	MPC · JPL
131158	2001 CD_{18}	—	February 2, 2001	Socorro	LINEAR	·	3.4 km	MPC · JPL
131159	2001 CS_{19}	—	February 2, 2001	Socorro	LINEAR	·	5.1 km	MPC · JPL
131160	2001 CQ_{21}	—	February 1, 2001	Anderson Mesa	LONEOS	·	4.7 km	MPC · JPL
131161	2001 CL_{23}	—	February 1, 2001	Anderson Mesa	LONEOS	·	6.2 km	MPC · JPL
131162	2001 CO_{24}	—	February 1, 2001	Anderson Mesa	LONEOS	·	4.1 km	MPC · JPL
131163	2001 CT_{26}	—	February 1, 2001	Kitt Peak	Spacewatch	·	2.8 km	MPC · JPL
131164	2001 CW_{27}	—	February 2, 2001	Anderson Mesa	LONEOS	·	2.1 km	MPC · JPL
131165	2001 CU_{28}	—	February 2, 2001	Anderson Mesa	LONEOS	·	5.0 km	MPC · JPL
131166	2001 CK_{30}	—	February 2, 2001	Socorro	LINEAR	fast	2.8 km	MPC · JPL
131167	2001 CH_{31}	—	February 3, 2001	Socorro	LINEAR	·	2.3 km	MPC · JPL
131168	2001 CR_{32}	—	February 13, 2001	Socorro	LINEAR	EUN	2.4 km	MPC · JPL
131169	2001 CX_{32}	—	February 13, 2001	Socorro	LINEAR	·	4.5 km	MPC · JPL
131170	2001 CD_{34}	—	February 13, 2001	Socorro	LINEAR	·	4.0 km	MPC · JPL
131171	2001 CO_{36}	—	February 15, 2001	Oizumi	T. Kobayashi	(5)	3.1 km	MPC · JPL
131172	2001 CV_{37}	—	February 15, 2001	Socorro	LINEAR	HNS	2.3 km	MPC · JPL
131173	2001 CN_{38}	—	February 13, 2001	Socorro	LINEAR	·	4.4 km	MPC · JPL
131174	2001 CW_{38}	—	February 13, 2001	Socorro	LINEAR	·	2.2 km	MPC · JPL
131175	2001 CX_{38}	—	February 13, 2001	Socorro	LINEAR	DOR	3.8 km	MPC · JPL
131176	2001 CE_{39}	—	February 13, 2001	Socorro	LINEAR	·	2.8 km	MPC · JPL
131177	2001 CL_{39}	—	February 13, 2001	Socorro	LINEAR	·	4.3 km	MPC · JPL
131178	2001 CK_{40}	—	February 13, 2001	Socorro	LINEAR	·	2.8 km	MPC · JPL
131179	2001 CW_{40}	—	February 15, 2001	Socorro	LINEAR	MAR	2.2 km	MPC · JPL
131180	2001 CR_{41}	—	February 15, 2001	Črni Vrh	Mikuž, H.	·	5.0 km	MPC · JPL
131181 Žebrák	2001 CT_{41}	Žebrák	February 15, 2001	Ondřejov	P. Pravec, L. Kotková	·	3.2 km	MPC · JPL
131182	2001 CC_{43}	—	February 15, 2001	Socorro	LINEAR	HNS	2.7 km	MPC · JPL
131183	2001 CJ_{45}	—	February 15, 2001	Socorro	LINEAR	·	2.4 km	MPC · JPL
131184	2001 CE_{46}	—	February 15, 2001	Socorro	LINEAR	·	3.2 km	MPC · JPL
131185	2001 CR_{46}	—	February 13, 2001	Socorro	LINEAR	·	3.7 km	MPC · JPL
131186 Pauluckas	2001 DS	Pauluckas	February 16, 2001	Nogales	P. R. Holvorcem, M. Schwartz	·	3.7 km	MPC · JPL
131187	2001 DW	—	February 16, 2001	Nogales	Tenagra II	·	2.2 km	MPC · JPL
131188	2001 DE_{2}	—	February 16, 2001	Kitt Peak	Spacewatch	·	3.6 km	MPC · JPL
131189	2001 DO_{3}	—	February 16, 2001	Socorro	LINEAR	·	2.7 km	MPC · JPL
131190	2001 DH_{6}	—	February 16, 2001	Socorro	LINEAR	·	2.5 km	MPC · JPL
131191	2001 DC_{7}	—	February 17, 2001	Farpoint	Farpoint	·	2.8 km	MPC · JPL
131192	2001 DN_{7}	—	February 16, 2001	Oizumi	T. Kobayashi	·	4.6 km	MPC · JPL
131193	2001 DY_{7}	—	February 17, 2001	Nogales	Tenagra II	·	2.6 km	MPC · JPL
131194	2001 DD_{10}	—	February 16, 2001	Socorro	LINEAR	·	4.0 km	MPC · JPL
131195	2001 DZ_{11}	—	February 17, 2001	Socorro	LINEAR	DOR	4.5 km	MPC · JPL
131196	2001 DY_{17}	—	February 16, 2001	Socorro	LINEAR	·	3.7 km	MPC · JPL
131197	2001 DA_{18}	—	February 16, 2001	Socorro	LINEAR	·	4.0 km	MPC · JPL
131198	2001 DW_{19}	—	February 16, 2001	Socorro	LINEAR	·	2.4 km	MPC · JPL
131199	2001 DO_{23}	—	February 17, 2001	Socorro	LINEAR	MRX	2.0 km	MPC · JPL
131200	2001 DD_{27}	—	February 17, 2001	Socorro	LINEAR	MRX	2.4 km	MPC · JPL

== 131201–131300 ==
back to top

Designation			Discovery			Properties		Ref
Permanent	Provisional	Named after	Date	Site	Discoverer(s)	Category	Diam.	Ref
131201	2001 DN_{27}	—	February 17, 2001	Socorro	LINEAR	·	2.6 km	MPC · JPL
131202	2001 DS_{28}	—	February 17, 2001	Socorro	LINEAR	·	3.5 km	MPC · JPL
131203	2001 DT_{29}	—	February 17, 2001	Socorro	LINEAR	·	4.3 km	MPC · JPL
131204	2001 DE_{32}	—	February 17, 2001	Socorro	LINEAR	·	1.9 km	MPC · JPL
131205	2001 DK_{36}	—	February 19, 2001	Socorro	LINEAR	fast	2.9 km	MPC · JPL
131206	2001 DV_{41}	—	February 19, 2001	Socorro	LINEAR	·	3.7 km	MPC · JPL
131207	2001 DH_{43}	—	February 19, 2001	Socorro	LINEAR	·	3.8 km	MPC · JPL
131208	2001 DH_{48}	—	February 16, 2001	Socorro	LINEAR	NEM	4.5 km	MPC · JPL
131209	2001 DS_{48}	—	February 16, 2001	Socorro	LINEAR	·	2.7 km	MPC · JPL
131210	2001 DV_{48}	—	February 16, 2001	Socorro	LINEAR	·	1.8 km	MPC · JPL
131211	2001 DE_{49}	—	February 16, 2001	Socorro	LINEAR	·	2.6 km	MPC · JPL
131212	2001 DU_{49}	—	February 16, 2001	Socorro	LINEAR	·	3.1 km	MPC · JPL
131213	2001 DP_{50}	—	February 16, 2001	Socorro	LINEAR	·	4.0 km	MPC · JPL
131214	2001 DV_{62}	—	February 19, 2001	Socorro	LINEAR	·	3.7 km	MPC · JPL
131215	2001 DB_{63}	—	February 19, 2001	Socorro	LINEAR	·	2.9 km	MPC · JPL
131216	2001 DL_{63}	—	February 19, 2001	Socorro	LINEAR	·	1.8 km	MPC · JPL
131217	2001 DW_{67}	—	February 19, 2001	Socorro	LINEAR	EUN	2.4 km	MPC · JPL
131218	2001 DL_{71}	—	February 19, 2001	Socorro	LINEAR	·	4.2 km	MPC · JPL
131219	2001 DT_{76}	—	February 21, 2001	Socorro	LINEAR	·	5.4 km	MPC · JPL
131220	2001 DN_{78}	—	February 22, 2001	Kitt Peak	Spacewatch	AST	4.5 km	MPC · JPL
131221	2001 DZ_{80}	—	February 22, 2001	Nogales	Tenagra II	·	3.5 km	MPC · JPL
131222	2001 DW_{82}	—	February 22, 2001	Kitt Peak	Spacewatch	·	3.4 km	MPC · JPL
131223	2001 DQ_{91}	—	February 20, 2001	Kitt Peak	Spacewatch	DOR	5.0 km	MPC · JPL
131224	2001 DT_{92}	—	February 19, 2001	Anderson Mesa	LONEOS	AGN	2.3 km	MPC · JPL
131225	2001 DD_{93}	—	February 19, 2001	Anderson Mesa	LONEOS	·	2.5 km	MPC · JPL
131226	2001 DM_{93}	—	February 19, 2001	Socorro	LINEAR	DOR	5.0 km	MPC · JPL
131227	2001 DZ_{95}	—	February 17, 2001	Socorro	LINEAR	·	4.5 km	MPC · JPL
131228	2001 DK_{97}	—	February 17, 2001	Socorro	LINEAR	·	2.8 km	MPC · JPL
131229	2001 DU_{100}	—	February 16, 2001	Socorro	LINEAR	ADE	4.9 km	MPC · JPL
131230	2001 DD_{101}	—	February 16, 2001	Socorro	LINEAR	·	4.1 km	MPC · JPL
131231	2001 DJ_{101}	—	February 16, 2001	Socorro	LINEAR	·	4.7 km	MPC · JPL
131232	2001 DC_{103}	—	February 16, 2001	Socorro	LINEAR	GEF	2.6 km	MPC · JPL
131233	2001 DL_{105}	—	February 16, 2001	Anderson Mesa	LONEOS	·	2.8 km	MPC · JPL
131234	2001 DT_{107}	—	February 22, 2001	Kitt Peak	Spacewatch	ADE	4.8 km	MPC · JPL
131235	2001 DA_{109}	—	February 17, 2001	Kitt Peak	Spacewatch	·	2.7 km	MPC · JPL
131236	2001 ER	—	March 4, 2001	Oaxaca	Roe, J. M.	·	2.3 km	MPC · JPL
131237	2001 EE_{1}	—	March 1, 2001	Socorro	LINEAR	·	4.4 km	MPC · JPL
131238	2001 EW_{1}	—	March 1, 2001	Socorro	LINEAR	·	3.7 km	MPC · JPL
131239	2001 EB_{2}	—	March 1, 2001	Socorro	LINEAR	ADE	5.1 km	MPC · JPL
131240	2001 EN_{8}	—	March 2, 2001	Anderson Mesa	LONEOS	·	3.4 km	MPC · JPL
131241	2001 EY_{8}	—	March 2, 2001	Anderson Mesa	LONEOS	·	4.4 km	MPC · JPL
131242	2001 EE_{9}	—	March 2, 2001	Anderson Mesa	LONEOS	·	2.7 km	MPC · JPL
131243	2001 EV_{14}	—	March 15, 2001	Socorro	LINEAR	·	1.9 km	MPC · JPL
131244	2001 FD	—	March 18, 2001	Oizumi	T. Kobayashi	DOR	4.1 km	MPC · JPL
131245 Bakich	2001 FF_{1}	Bakich	March 16, 2001	Junk Bond	D. Healy	HOF	4.9 km	MPC · JPL
131246	2001 FH_{4}	—	March 16, 2001	Kitt Peak	Spacewatch	·	2.5 km	MPC · JPL
131247	2001 FU_{4}	—	March 19, 2001	Prescott	P. G. Comba	·	4.6 km	MPC · JPL
131248	2001 FX_{8}	—	March 19, 2001	Socorro	LINEAR	·	2.6 km	MPC · JPL
131249	2001 FP_{12}	—	March 19, 2001	Anderson Mesa	LONEOS	·	3.3 km	MPC · JPL
131250	2001 FV_{13}	—	March 19, 2001	Anderson Mesa	LONEOS	KOR	2.4 km	MPC · JPL
131251	2001 FY_{13}	—	March 19, 2001	Anderson Mesa	LONEOS	KOR	3.3 km	MPC · JPL
131252	2001 FJ_{16}	—	March 19, 2001	Anderson Mesa	LONEOS	·	2.3 km	MPC · JPL
131253	2001 FA_{18}	—	March 19, 2001	Anderson Mesa	LONEOS	·	4.0 km	MPC · JPL
131254	2001 FN_{18}	—	March 19, 2001	Anderson Mesa	LONEOS	EOS	4.2 km	MPC · JPL
131255	2001 FB_{23}	—	March 21, 2001	Anderson Mesa	LONEOS	·	3.9 km	MPC · JPL
131256	2001 FA_{25}	—	March 18, 2001	Socorro	LINEAR	·	4.3 km	MPC · JPL
131257	2001 FG_{29}	—	March 19, 2001	Socorro	LINEAR	·	7.4 km	MPC · JPL
131258	2001 FD_{30}	—	March 20, 2001	Haleakala	NEAT	·	4.6 km	MPC · JPL
131259	2001 FE_{30}	—	March 20, 2001	Haleakala	NEAT	NAE	5.9 km	MPC · JPL
131260	2001 FG_{33}	—	March 17, 2001	Socorro	LINEAR	526	4.6 km	MPC · JPL
131261	2001 FU_{35}	—	March 18, 2001	Socorro	LINEAR	THM	4.3 km	MPC · JPL
131262	2001 FD_{36}	—	March 18, 2001	Socorro	LINEAR	·	5.5 km	MPC · JPL
131263	2001 FX_{39}	—	March 18, 2001	Socorro	LINEAR	slow	3.0 km	MPC · JPL
131264	2001 FA_{43}	—	March 18, 2001	Socorro	LINEAR	·	3.4 km	MPC · JPL
131265	2001 FD_{43}	—	March 18, 2001	Socorro	LINEAR	·	3.6 km	MPC · JPL
131266	2001 FM_{44}	—	March 18, 2001	Socorro	LINEAR	·	2.0 km	MPC · JPL
131267	2001 FX_{45}	—	March 18, 2001	Socorro	LINEAR	·	4.6 km	MPC · JPL
131268	2001 FW_{50}	—	March 18, 2001	Socorro	LINEAR	·	3.9 km	MPC · JPL
131269	2001 FF_{51}	—	March 18, 2001	Socorro	LINEAR	·	4.1 km	MPC · JPL
131270	2001 FY_{59}	—	March 19, 2001	Socorro	LINEAR	·	3.4 km	MPC · JPL
131271	2001 FT_{61}	—	March 19, 2001	Socorro	LINEAR	·	3.3 km	MPC · JPL
131272	2001 FR_{63}	—	March 19, 2001	Socorro	LINEAR	KOR	2.9 km	MPC · JPL
131273	2001 FQ_{64}	—	March 19, 2001	Socorro	LINEAR	·	3.1 km	MPC · JPL
131274	2001 FO_{65}	—	March 19, 2001	Socorro	LINEAR	·	5.2 km	MPC · JPL
131275	2001 FL_{66}	—	March 19, 2001	Socorro	LINEAR	(32418) · slow ·	3.2 km	MPC · JPL
131276	2001 FV_{67}	—	March 19, 2001	Socorro	LINEAR	·	5.4 km	MPC · JPL
131277	2001 FB_{69}	—	March 19, 2001	Socorro	LINEAR	KOR	2.8 km	MPC · JPL
131278	2001 FQ_{70}	—	March 19, 2001	Socorro	LINEAR	·	3.9 km	MPC · JPL
131279	2001 FC_{71}	—	March 19, 2001	Socorro	LINEAR	·	4.8 km	MPC · JPL
131280	2001 FX_{82}	—	March 23, 2001	Socorro	LINEAR	·	4.6 km	MPC · JPL
131281	2001 FP_{92}	—	March 16, 2001	Socorro	LINEAR	·	3.3 km	MPC · JPL
131282	2001 FW_{93}	—	March 16, 2001	Socorro	LINEAR	·	2.3 km	MPC · JPL
131283	2001 FX_{96}	—	March 16, 2001	Socorro	LINEAR	·	7.4 km	MPC · JPL
131284	2001 FH_{97}	—	March 16, 2001	Socorro	LINEAR	·	3.9 km	MPC · JPL
131285	2001 FO_{104}	—	March 18, 2001	Anderson Mesa	LONEOS	·	3.3 km	MPC · JPL
131286	2001 FP_{104}	—	March 18, 2001	Anderson Mesa	LONEOS	·	3.7 km	MPC · JPL
131287	2001 FS_{106}	—	March 18, 2001	Anderson Mesa	LONEOS	·	2.9 km	MPC · JPL
131288	2001 FT_{106}	—	March 18, 2001	Anderson Mesa	LONEOS	·	3.0 km	MPC · JPL
131289	2001 FD_{107}	—	March 18, 2001	Anderson Mesa	LONEOS	HOF	6.0 km	MPC · JPL
131290	2001 FL_{109}	—	March 18, 2001	Socorro	LINEAR	·	3.0 km	MPC · JPL
131291	2001 FD_{111}	—	March 18, 2001	Socorro	LINEAR	KOR	2.9 km	MPC · JPL
131292	2001 FD_{112}	—	March 18, 2001	Socorro	LINEAR	·	6.3 km	MPC · JPL
131293	2001 FY_{112}	—	March 18, 2001	Haleakala	NEAT	·	3.6 km	MPC · JPL
131294	2001 FM_{115}	—	March 19, 2001	Anderson Mesa	LONEOS	·	3.0 km	MPC · JPL
131295	2001 FH_{121}	—	March 26, 2001	Socorro	LINEAR	EUP	7.6 km	MPC · JPL
131296	2001 FK_{121}	—	March 23, 2001	Haleakala	NEAT	·	3.3 km	MPC · JPL
131297	2001 FB_{125}	—	March 29, 2001	Anderson Mesa	LONEOS	EOS	3.6 km	MPC · JPL
131298	2001 FJ_{125}	—	March 29, 2001	Anderson Mesa	LONEOS	·	2.9 km	MPC · JPL
131299	2001 FE_{128}	—	March 30, 2001	Anderson Mesa	LONEOS	T_{j} (2.95)	3.3 km	MPC · JPL
131300	2001 FF_{131}	—	March 20, 2001	Haleakala	NEAT	AGN	2.1 km	MPC · JPL

== 131301–131400 ==
back to top

Designation			Discovery			Properties		Ref
Permanent	Provisional	Named after	Date	Site	Discoverer(s)	Category	Diam.	Ref
131301	2001 FG_{139}	—	March 21, 2001	Haleakala	NEAT	·	3.4 km	MPC · JPL
131302	2001 FO_{143}	—	March 23, 2001	Kitt Peak	Spacewatch	·	4.2 km	MPC · JPL
131303	2001 FV_{144}	—	March 23, 2001	Haleakala	NEAT	·	2.9 km	MPC · JPL
131304	2001 FA_{145}	—	March 23, 2001	Haleakala	NEAT	JUN	2.3 km	MPC · JPL
131305	2001 FF_{145}	—	March 23, 2001	Haleakala	NEAT	TIR	5.8 km	MPC · JPL
131306	2001 FE_{152}	—	March 26, 2001	Socorro	LINEAR	·	3.9 km	MPC · JPL
131307	2001 FD_{154}	—	March 27, 2001	Anderson Mesa	LONEOS	·	4.9 km	MPC · JPL
131308	2001 FN_{154}	—	March 26, 2001	Socorro	LINEAR	·	1.7 km	MPC · JPL
131309	2001 FH_{158}	—	March 27, 2001	Haleakala	NEAT	DOR	2.9 km	MPC · JPL
131310	2001 FZ_{158}	—	March 29, 2001	Anderson Mesa	LONEOS	·	2.3 km	MPC · JPL
131311	2001 FF_{159}	—	March 29, 2001	Anderson Mesa	LONEOS	·	4.0 km	MPC · JPL
131312	2001 FR_{160}	—	March 29, 2001	Haleakala	NEAT	·	4.0 km	MPC · JPL
131313	2001 FO_{171}	—	March 24, 2001	Haleakala	NEAT	·	2.4 km	MPC · JPL
131314	2001 FW_{173}	—	March 21, 2001	Kitt Peak	Spacewatch	·	4.2 km	MPC · JPL
131315	2001 FK_{177}	—	March 18, 2001	Kitt Peak	Spacewatch	·	1.9 km	MPC · JPL
131316	2001 FE_{179}	—	March 20, 2001	Anderson Mesa	LONEOS	EOS	4.6 km	MPC · JPL
131317	2001 FF_{180}	—	March 20, 2001	Anderson Mesa	LONEOS	EUN	2.5 km	MPC · JPL
131318	2001 FL_{194}	—	March 22, 2001	Kitt Peak	D. Davis, B. Gladman, C. Neese, G. Esquardo	plutino	130 km	MPC · JPL
131319	2001 GB_{5}	—	April 15, 2001	Socorro	LINEAR	EUN	3.0 km	MPC · JPL
131320	2001 GJ_{8}	—	April 15, 2001	Socorro	LINEAR	·	4.1 km	MPC · JPL
131321	2001 GW_{8}	—	April 15, 2001	Kitt Peak	Spacewatch	EOS	3.6 km	MPC · JPL
131322	2001 GK_{9}	—	April 15, 2001	Socorro	LINEAR	EMA	7.4 km	MPC · JPL
131323	2001 GE_{11}	—	April 15, 2001	Haleakala	NEAT	·	4.9 km	MPC · JPL
131324	2001 HH_{7}	—	April 21, 2001	Socorro	LINEAR	H	910 m	MPC · JPL
131325	2001 HW_{8}	—	April 16, 2001	Socorro	LINEAR	·	6.4 km	MPC · JPL
131326	2001 HG_{18}	—	April 21, 2001	Socorro	LINEAR	EUP	7.3 km	MPC · JPL
131327	2001 HC_{23}	—	April 27, 2001	Emerald Lane	L. Ball	·	3.3 km	MPC · JPL
131328	2001 HM_{23}	—	April 23, 2001	Kitt Peak	Spacewatch	HOF	4.2 km	MPC · JPL
131329	2001 HP_{24}	—	April 27, 2001	Kitt Peak	Spacewatch	·	5.8 km	MPC · JPL
131330	2001 HW_{26}	—	April 27, 2001	Desert Beaver	W. K. Y. Yeung	·	9.3 km	MPC · JPL
131331	2001 HC_{27}	—	April 27, 2001	Desert Beaver	W. K. Y. Yeung	·	6.3 km	MPC · JPL
131332	2001 HK_{30}	—	April 27, 2001	Socorro	LINEAR	H	1.3 km	MPC · JPL
131333	2001 HZ_{31}	—	April 28, 2001	Desert Beaver	W. K. Y. Yeung	slow	5.3 km	MPC · JPL
131334	2001 HD_{34}	—	April 27, 2001	Socorro	LINEAR	·	4.0 km	MPC · JPL
131335	2001 HO_{34}	—	April 27, 2001	Socorro	LINEAR	·	3.4 km	MPC · JPL
131336	2001 HP_{35}	—	April 29, 2001	Socorro	LINEAR	·	5.8 km	MPC · JPL
131337	2001 HP_{37}	—	April 29, 2001	Socorro	LINEAR	EOS	4.9 km	MPC · JPL
131338	2001 HU_{41}	—	April 16, 2001	Kitt Peak	Spacewatch	EOS	4.0 km	MPC · JPL
131339	2001 HZ_{42}	—	April 16, 2001	Anderson Mesa	LONEOS	·	3.9 km	MPC · JPL
131340	2001 HW_{44}	—	April 16, 2001	Anderson Mesa	LONEOS	·	7.1 km	MPC · JPL
131341	2001 HN_{47}	—	April 18, 2001	Haleakala	NEAT	EOS	4.3 km	MPC · JPL
131342	2001 HG_{49}	—	April 21, 2001	Socorro	LINEAR	ADE	5.7 km	MPC · JPL
131343	2001 HX_{53}	—	April 24, 2001	Anderson Mesa	LONEOS	·	7.0 km	MPC · JPL
131344	2001 HK_{54}	—	April 24, 2001	Socorro	LINEAR	·	5.9 km	MPC · JPL
131345	2001 HY_{55}	—	April 24, 2001	Socorro	LINEAR	·	4.9 km	MPC · JPL
131346	2001 HU_{56}	—	April 24, 2001	Haleakala	NEAT	·	4.4 km	MPC · JPL
131347	2001 HE_{58}	—	April 25, 2001	Anderson Mesa	LONEOS	GEF	3.3 km	MPC · JPL
131348	2001 HB_{59}	—	April 21, 2001	Socorro	LINEAR	·	6.0 km	MPC · JPL
131349	2001 HN_{59}	—	April 23, 2001	Socorro	LINEAR	·	3.2 km	MPC · JPL
131350	2001 HC_{64}	—	April 27, 2001	Socorro	LINEAR	·	5.2 km	MPC · JPL
131351	2001 JE	—	May 2, 2001	Reedy Creek	J. Broughton	GEF	3.0 km	MPC · JPL
131352	2001 JA_{1}	—	May 11, 2001	Ondřejov	L. Kotková	HYG	6.5 km	MPC · JPL
131353	2001 JE_{2}	—	May 15, 2001	Kitt Peak	Spacewatch	·	7.8 km	MPC · JPL
131354	2001 JJ_{2}	—	May 15, 2001	Kitt Peak	Spacewatch	·	4.4 km	MPC · JPL
131355	2001 JV_{3}	—	May 15, 2001	Haleakala	NEAT	EOS	4.4 km	MPC · JPL
131356	2001 JB_{4}	—	May 15, 2001	Haleakala	NEAT	NAE	5.7 km	MPC · JPL
131357	2001 JM_{8}	—	May 15, 2001	Anderson Mesa	LONEOS	·	5.5 km	MPC · JPL
131358 Kamolergashev	2001 KA_{2}	Kamolergashev	May 19, 2001	Ondřejov	P. Pravec, P. Kušnirák	·	3.9 km	MPC · JPL
131359	2001 KJ_{2}	—	May 17, 2001	Haleakala	NEAT	·	2.7 km	MPC · JPL
131360	2001 KN_{4}	—	May 17, 2001	Socorro	LINEAR	·	5.3 km	MPC · JPL
131361	2001 KN_{5}	—	May 17, 2001	Socorro	LINEAR	·	5.8 km	MPC · JPL
131362	2001 KO_{5}	—	May 17, 2001	Socorro	LINEAR	·	4.6 km	MPC · JPL
131363	2001 KF_{7}	—	May 17, 2001	Socorro	LINEAR	·	8.8 km	MPC · JPL
131364	2001 KR_{7}	—	May 18, 2001	Socorro	LINEAR	·	3.9 km	MPC · JPL
131365	2001 KN_{11}	—	May 18, 2001	Socorro	LINEAR	·	8.5 km	MPC · JPL
131366	2001 KE_{16}	—	May 18, 2001	Socorro	LINEAR	·	5.0 km	MPC · JPL
131367	2001 KS_{16}	—	May 18, 2001	Socorro	LINEAR	fast	6.0 km	MPC · JPL
131368	2001 KR_{18}	—	May 21, 2001	Kitt Peak	Spacewatch	·	8.1 km	MPC · JPL
131369	2001 KX_{18}	—	May 18, 2001	Socorro	LINEAR	H	930 m	MPC · JPL
131370	2001 KF_{22}	—	May 17, 2001	Socorro	LINEAR	EUN	2.7 km	MPC · JPL
131371	2001 KJ_{25}	—	May 17, 2001	Socorro	LINEAR	·	4.9 km	MPC · JPL
131372	2001 KR_{26}	—	May 17, 2001	Socorro	LINEAR	EOS	4.9 km	MPC · JPL
131373	2001 KS_{26}	—	May 17, 2001	Socorro	LINEAR	·	4.8 km	MPC · JPL
131374	2001 KG_{29}	—	May 21, 2001	Socorro	LINEAR	·	4.9 km	MPC · JPL
131375	2001 KL_{30}	—	May 21, 2001	Socorro	LINEAR	·	7.1 km	MPC · JPL
131376	2001 KX_{31}	—	May 23, 2001	Socorro	LINEAR	T_{j} (2.99) · EUP	8.2 km	MPC · JPL
131377	2001 KQ_{33}	—	May 18, 2001	Socorro	LINEAR	VER	7.4 km	MPC · JPL
131378	2001 KP_{35}	—	May 18, 2001	Socorro	LINEAR	·	7.9 km	MPC · JPL
131379	2001 KT_{38}	—	May 22, 2001	Socorro	LINEAR	TIR	5.2 km	MPC · JPL
131380	2001 KL_{39}	—	May 22, 2001	Socorro	LINEAR	·	4.4 km	MPC · JPL
131381	2001 KU_{39}	—	May 22, 2001	Socorro	LINEAR	slow	10 km	MPC · JPL
131382	2001 KY_{39}	—	May 22, 2001	Socorro	LINEAR	·	9.6 km	MPC · JPL
131383	2001 KJ_{40}	—	May 22, 2001	Socorro	LINEAR	·	7.5 km	MPC · JPL
131384	2001 KC_{41}	—	May 23, 2001	Socorro	LINEAR	H	1.1 km	MPC · JPL
131385	2001 KE_{41}	—	May 23, 2001	Socorro	LINEAR	slow	8.3 km	MPC · JPL
131386	2001 KR_{42}	—	May 22, 2001	Socorro	LINEAR	·	6.1 km	MPC · JPL
131387	2001 KN_{49}	—	May 24, 2001	Socorro	LINEAR	·	9.3 km	MPC · JPL
131388	2001 KQ_{52}	—	May 18, 2001	Anderson Mesa	LONEOS	·	5.7 km	MPC · JPL
131389	2001 KG_{53}	—	May 18, 2001	Socorro	LINEAR	EOS	4.3 km	MPC · JPL
131390	2001 KN_{55}	—	May 22, 2001	Socorro	LINEAR	·	4.7 km	MPC · JPL
131391	2001 KR_{55}	—	May 22, 2001	Socorro	LINEAR	URS	7.5 km	MPC · JPL
131392	2001 KS_{55}	—	May 22, 2001	Socorro	LINEAR	·	4.9 km	MPC · JPL
131393	2001 KS_{56}	—	May 23, 2001	Socorro	LINEAR	·	6.4 km	MPC · JPL
131394	2001 KC_{60}	—	May 26, 2001	Socorro	LINEAR	·	5.6 km	MPC · JPL
131395	2001 KS_{61}	—	May 18, 2001	Goodricke-Pigott	R. A. Tucker	·	7.9 km	MPC · JPL
131396	2001 KK_{62}	—	May 18, 2001	Socorro	LINEAR	EOS	3.8 km	MPC · JPL
131397	2001 KX_{62}	—	May 18, 2001	Anderson Mesa	LONEOS	·	5.9 km	MPC · JPL
131398	2001 KZ_{64}	—	May 22, 2001	Anderson Mesa	LONEOS	·	7.5 km	MPC · JPL
131399	2001 KN_{65}	—	May 22, 2001	Anderson Mesa	LONEOS	·	6.7 km	MPC · JPL
131400	2001 KT_{74}	—	May 26, 2001	Socorro	LINEAR	·	11 km	MPC · JPL

== 131401–131500 ==
back to top

Designation			Discovery			Properties		Ref
Permanent	Provisional	Named after	Date	Site	Discoverer(s)	Category	Diam.	Ref
131401	2001 LY	—	June 13, 2001	Socorro	LINEAR	·	5.6 km	MPC · JPL
131402	2001 LP_{3}	—	June 13, 2001	Socorro	LINEAR	·	6.7 km	MPC · JPL
131403	2001 LS_{3}	—	June 13, 2001	Socorro	LINEAR	·	4.9 km	MPC · JPL
131404	2001 LZ_{4}	—	June 12, 2001	Haleakala	NEAT	·	4.8 km	MPC · JPL
131405	2001 LB_{8}	—	June 15, 2001	Palomar	NEAT	·	5.2 km	MPC · JPL
131406	2001 LB_{12}	—	June 15, 2001	Socorro	LINEAR	·	11 km	MPC · JPL
131407	2001 LR_{18}	—	June 15, 2001	Palomar	NEAT	·	7.3 km	MPC · JPL
131408	2001 MN_{3}	—	June 18, 2001	Socorro	LINEAR	T_{j} (2.94)	8.9 km	MPC · JPL
131409	2001 MX_{5}	—	June 18, 2001	Palomar	NEAT	·	5.1 km	MPC · JPL
131410	2001 MN_{8}	—	June 24, 2001	Desert Beaver	W. K. Y. Yeung	T_{j} (2.99)	8.4 km	MPC · JPL
131411	2001 MN_{9}	—	June 21, 2001	Palomar	NEAT	H	1.1 km	MPC · JPL
131412	2001 MP_{16}	—	June 27, 2001	Palomar	NEAT	·	6.8 km	MPC · JPL
131413	2001 NT	—	July 8, 2001	Palomar	NEAT	H	1.2 km	MPC · JPL
131414	2001 NB_{6}	—	July 14, 2001	Emerald Lane	L. Ball	·	5.5 km	MPC · JPL
131415	2001 NA_{19}	—	July 13, 2001	Palomar	NEAT	H	970 m	MPC · JPL
131416	2001 OA	—	July 16, 2001	Reedy Creek	J. Broughton	·	4.3 km	MPC · JPL
131417	2001 OC_{5}	—	July 17, 2001	Anderson Mesa	LONEOS	·	9.8 km	MPC · JPL
131418	2001 OO_{5}	—	July 17, 2001	Anderson Mesa	LONEOS	·	9.6 km	MPC · JPL
131419	2001 OH_{13}	—	July 20, 2001	Socorro	LINEAR	H	1.4 km	MPC · JPL
131420	2001 OO_{45}	—	July 16, 2001	Socorro	LINEAR	H	820 m	MPC · JPL
131421	2001 OL_{58}	—	July 20, 2001	Anderson Mesa	LONEOS	3:2	9.0 km	MPC · JPL
131422	2001 OU_{71}	—	July 21, 2001	Haleakala	NEAT	·	6.0 km	MPC · JPL
131423	2001 OF_{77}	—	July 29, 2001	Ondřejov	Ondrejov	·	6.0 km	MPC · JPL
131424	2001 OZ_{79}	—	July 29, 2001	Palomar	NEAT	THM	3.7 km	MPC · JPL
131425	2001 OK_{81}	—	July 29, 2001	Socorro	LINEAR	·	7.1 km	MPC · JPL
131426	2001 OX_{93}	—	July 27, 2001	Palomar	NEAT	slow	6.2 km	MPC · JPL
131427	2001 OW_{98}	—	July 26, 2001	Palomar	NEAT	·	11 km	MPC · JPL
131428	2001 OO_{100}	—	July 27, 2001	Anderson Mesa	LONEOS	·	5.2 km	MPC · JPL
131429	2001 OH_{101}	—	July 27, 2001	Haleakala	NEAT	·	15 km	MPC · JPL
131430	2001 OX_{102}	—	July 29, 2001	Anderson Mesa	LONEOS	·	8.7 km	MPC · JPL
131431	2001 PL_{4}	—	August 10, 2001	Palomar	NEAT	H	1.2 km	MPC · JPL
131432	2001 PX_{39}	—	August 11, 2001	Palomar	NEAT	·	4.6 km	MPC · JPL
131433	2001 PB_{40}	—	August 11, 2001	Palomar	NEAT	EOS	4.6 km	MPC · JPL
131434	2001 PX_{40}	—	August 11, 2001	Palomar	NEAT	·	5.6 km	MPC · JPL
131435	2001 PD_{42}	—	August 12, 2001	Palomar	NEAT	·	5.2 km	MPC · JPL
131436	2001 QS_{11}	—	August 16, 2001	Socorro	LINEAR	·	5.6 km	MPC · JPL
131437	2001 QX_{37}	—	August 16, 2001	Socorro	LINEAR	·	6.0 km	MPC · JPL
131438	2001 QS_{60}	—	August 16, 2001	Palomar	NEAT	·	8.8 km	MPC · JPL
131439	2001 QK_{68}	—	August 20, 2001	Oakley	Wolfe, C.	H	1.1 km	MPC · JPL
131440	2001 QB_{71}	—	August 17, 2001	Socorro	LINEAR	·	8.5 km	MPC · JPL
131441	2001 QS_{82}	—	August 17, 2001	Socorro	LINEAR	·	2.7 km	MPC · JPL
131442	2001 QX_{86}	—	August 17, 2001	Palomar	NEAT	·	8.5 km	MPC · JPL
131443	2001 QH_{88}	—	August 21, 2001	Kitt Peak	Spacewatch	CYB	4.3 km	MPC · JPL
131444	2001 QA_{91}	—	August 22, 2001	Socorro	LINEAR	H	1.3 km	MPC · JPL
131445	2001 QG_{94}	—	August 22, 2001	Socorro	LINEAR	H	970 m	MPC · JPL
131446	2001 QP_{100}	—	August 24, 2001	Emerald Lane	L. Ball	·	6.3 km	MPC · JPL
131447	2001 QZ_{113}	—	August 22, 2001	Socorro	LINEAR	L5	24 km	MPC · JPL
131448	2001 QD_{128}	—	August 20, 2001	Socorro	LINEAR	TEL	3.6 km	MPC · JPL
131449	2001 QL_{134}	—	August 22, 2001	Socorro	LINEAR	·	6.1 km	MPC · JPL
131450	2001 QH_{151}	—	August 23, 2001	Socorro	LINEAR	H	1.3 km	MPC · JPL
131451	2001 QD_{174}	—	August 26, 2001	Socorro	LINEAR	L5	21 km	MPC · JPL
131452	2001 QV_{186}	—	August 21, 2001	Kitt Peak	Spacewatch	EOS	3.1 km	MPC · JPL
131453	2001 QR_{189}	—	August 22, 2001	Socorro	LINEAR	·	4.7 km	MPC · JPL
131454	2001 QE_{190}	—	August 22, 2001	Socorro	LINEAR	·	4.1 km	MPC · JPL
131455	2001 QG_{190}	—	August 22, 2001	Socorro	LINEAR	TIR	6.8 km	MPC · JPL
131456	2001 QF_{191}	—	August 22, 2001	Palomar	NEAT	H	840 m	MPC · JPL
131457	2001 QJ_{191}	—	August 22, 2001	Palomar	NEAT	H	1.2 km	MPC · JPL
131458	2001 QA_{194}	—	August 22, 2001	Socorro	LINEAR	·	5.8 km	MPC · JPL
131459	2001 QC_{194}	—	August 22, 2001	Socorro	LINEAR	·	7.6 km	MPC · JPL
131460	2001 QE_{194}	—	August 22, 2001	Socorro	LINEAR	L5	16 km	MPC · JPL
131461	2001 QF_{221}	—	August 24, 2001	Anderson Mesa	LONEOS	·	5.5 km	MPC · JPL
131462	2001 QL_{227}	—	August 24, 2001	Anderson Mesa	LONEOS	EOS	3.1 km	MPC · JPL
131463	2001 QT_{286}	—	August 17, 2001	Palomar	NEAT	·	3.6 km	MPC · JPL
131464	2001 QK_{289}	—	August 16, 2001	Palomar	NEAT	·	7.2 km	MPC · JPL
131465	2001 QU_{290}	—	August 16, 2001	Palomar	NEAT	H	870 m	MPC · JPL
131466	2001 QU_{326}	—	August 23, 2001	Palomar	NEAT	·	6.4 km	MPC · JPL
131467	2001 RZ_{5}	—	September 8, 2001	Socorro	LINEAR	H	890 m	MPC · JPL
131468	2001 RM_{7}	—	September 7, 2001	Socorro	LINEAR	3:2	7.6 km	MPC · JPL
131469	2001 RR_{9}	—	September 10, 2001	Socorro	LINEAR	H	1.3 km	MPC · JPL
131470	2001 RN_{46}	—	September 11, 2001	Socorro	LINEAR	H	1.2 km	MPC · JPL
131471	2001 RY_{46}	—	September 11, 2001	Socorro	LINEAR	H	1.2 km	MPC · JPL
131472	2001 RV_{67}	—	September 10, 2001	Socorro	LINEAR	TIR	5.1 km	MPC · JPL
131473	2001 RQ_{73}	—	September 10, 2001	Socorro	LINEAR	·	3.0 km	MPC · JPL
131474	2001 RA_{82}	—	September 12, 2001	Goodricke-Pigott	R. A. Tucker	EOS	3.9 km	MPC · JPL
131475	2001 RL_{82}	—	September 11, 2001	Anderson Mesa	LONEOS	EOS	5.1 km	MPC · JPL
131476	2001 RB_{92}	—	September 11, 2001	Anderson Mesa	LONEOS	·	3.9 km	MPC · JPL
131477	2001 RN_{93}	—	September 11, 2001	Anderson Mesa	LONEOS	THM	4.8 km	MPC · JPL
131478	2001 RV_{95}	—	September 11, 2001	Kitt Peak	Spacewatch	·	1.0 km	MPC · JPL
131479	2001 RG_{99}	—	September 12, 2001	Socorro	LINEAR	·	830 m	MPC · JPL
131480	2001 RY_{101}	—	September 12, 2001	Socorro	LINEAR	CYB	7.1 km	MPC · JPL
131481	2001 RT_{111}	—	September 12, 2001	Socorro	LINEAR	3:2	8.0 km	MPC · JPL
131482	2001 SF_{30}	—	September 16, 2001	Socorro	LINEAR	·	1.2 km	MPC · JPL
131483	2001 SS_{34}	—	September 16, 2001	Socorro	LINEAR	THM	4.9 km	MPC · JPL
131484	2001 SU_{38}	—	September 16, 2001	Socorro	LINEAR	·	6.2 km	MPC · JPL
131485	2001 SO_{68}	—	September 17, 2001	Socorro	LINEAR	TIR	5.1 km	MPC · JPL
131486	2001 SZ_{78}	—	September 20, 2001	Socorro	LINEAR	H	810 m	MPC · JPL
131487	2001 SS_{90}	—	September 20, 2001	Socorro	LINEAR	·	1.2 km	MPC · JPL
131488	2001 SL_{94}	—	September 20, 2001	Socorro	LINEAR	·	1.5 km	MPC · JPL
131489	2001 SA_{159}	—	September 17, 2001	Socorro	LINEAR	·	1.4 km	MPC · JPL
131490	2001 SJ_{164}	—	September 17, 2001	Socorro	LINEAR	·	7.0 km	MPC · JPL
131491	2001 SW_{178}	—	September 17, 2001	Socorro	LINEAR	·	1.4 km	MPC · JPL
131492	2001 SP_{181}	—	September 19, 2001	Socorro	LINEAR	slow	6.8 km	MPC · JPL
131493	2001 SP_{185}	—	September 19, 2001	Socorro	LINEAR	·	4.0 km	MPC · JPL
131494	2001 ST_{227}	—	September 19, 2001	Socorro	LINEAR	·	920 m	MPC · JPL
131495	2001 SW_{236}	—	September 19, 2001	Socorro	LINEAR	·	880 m	MPC · JPL
131496	2001 SM_{239}	—	September 19, 2001	Socorro	LINEAR	·	1.3 km	MPC · JPL
131497	2001 SQ_{248}	—	September 19, 2001	Socorro	LINEAR	·	970 m	MPC · JPL
131498	2001 ST_{260}	—	September 20, 2001	Socorro	LINEAR	·	1.4 km	MPC · JPL
131499	2001 SU_{266}	—	September 25, 2001	Desert Eagle	W. K. Y. Yeung	·	1.5 km	MPC · JPL
131500	2001 SK_{270}	—	September 26, 2001	Fountain Hills	C. W. Juels, P. R. Holvorcem	·	9.2 km	MPC · JPL

== 131501–131600 ==
back to top

Designation			Discovery			Properties		Ref
Permanent	Provisional	Named after	Date	Site	Discoverer(s)	Category	Diam.	Ref
131501	2001 SX_{272}	—	September 26, 2001	Anderson Mesa	LONEOS	·	7.3 km	MPC · JPL
131502	2001 SW_{273}	—	September 19, 2001	Kitt Peak	Spacewatch	3:2 · SHU	8.7 km	MPC · JPL
131503	2001 SS_{279}	—	September 21, 2001	Anderson Mesa	LONEOS	·	1.3 km	MPC · JPL
131504	2001 SX_{280}	—	September 21, 2001	Anderson Mesa	LONEOS	·	1.2 km	MPC · JPL
131505	2001 SK_{283}	—	September 27, 2001	Socorro	LINEAR	·	1.4 km	MPC · JPL
131506	2001 SP_{288}	—	September 28, 2001	Palomar	NEAT	VER	5.4 km	MPC · JPL
131507	2001 SC_{305}	—	September 20, 2001	Socorro	LINEAR	·	750 m	MPC · JPL
131508	2001 SE_{318}	—	September 20, 2001	Socorro	LINEAR	·	1.4 km	MPC · JPL
131509	2001 TK_{11}	—	October 13, 2001	Socorro	LINEAR	·	2.1 km	MPC · JPL
131510	2001 TV_{33}	—	October 14, 2001	Socorro	LINEAR	·	1.2 km	MPC · JPL
131511	2001 TL_{43}	—	October 14, 2001	Socorro	LINEAR	·	1.8 km	MPC · JPL
131512	2001 TS_{46}	—	October 15, 2001	Socorro	LINEAR	·	1.9 km	MPC · JPL
131513	2001 TD_{69}	—	October 13, 2001	Socorro	LINEAR	·	930 m	MPC · JPL
131514	2001 TU_{79}	—	October 13, 2001	Socorro	LINEAR	·	1.5 km	MPC · JPL
131515	2001 TO_{96}	—	October 14, 2001	Socorro	LINEAR	·	1.3 km	MPC · JPL
131516	2001 TH_{117}	—	October 14, 2001	Socorro	LINEAR	·	1.9 km	MPC · JPL
131517	2001 TN_{120}	—	October 15, 2001	Socorro	LINEAR	·	8.0 km	MPC · JPL
131518	2001 TW_{120}	—	October 15, 2001	Socorro	LINEAR	·	7.4 km	MPC · JPL
131519	2001 TL_{191}	—	October 14, 2001	Socorro	LINEAR	·	1.2 km	MPC · JPL
131520	2001 TW_{192}	—	October 14, 2001	Socorro	LINEAR	·	1.7 km	MPC · JPL
131521	2001 TJ_{193}	—	October 14, 2001	Socorro	LINEAR	·	1.8 km	MPC · JPL
131522	2001 TW_{196}	—	October 15, 2001	Haleakala	NEAT	·	7.4 km	MPC · JPL
131523	2001 TY_{199}	—	October 11, 2001	Socorro	LINEAR	·	7.3 km	MPC · JPL
131524	2001 TD_{236}	—	October 15, 2001	Palomar	NEAT	·	1.6 km	MPC · JPL
131525	2001 UZ_{41}	—	October 17, 2001	Socorro	LINEAR	·	1.3 km	MPC · JPL
131526	2001 UJ_{46}	—	October 17, 2001	Socorro	LINEAR	·	1.1 km	MPC · JPL
131527	2001 UQ_{52}	—	October 17, 2001	Socorro	LINEAR	·	1.6 km	MPC · JPL
131528	2001 UT_{52}	—	October 17, 2001	Socorro	LINEAR	·	1.3 km	MPC · JPL
131529	2001 UE_{73}	—	October 17, 2001	Socorro	LINEAR	(3460)	3.7 km	MPC · JPL
131530	2001 UO_{79}	—	October 20, 2001	Socorro	LINEAR	·	3.0 km	MPC · JPL
131531	2001 UL_{81}	—	October 20, 2001	Socorro	LINEAR	·	2.4 km	MPC · JPL
131532	2001 UK_{95}	—	October 19, 2001	Palomar	NEAT	·	1.0 km	MPC · JPL
131533	2001 UV_{103}	—	October 20, 2001	Socorro	LINEAR	·	760 m	MPC · JPL
131534	2001 UQ_{104}	—	October 20, 2001	Socorro	LINEAR	NYS	1.4 km	MPC · JPL
131535	2001 UU_{111}	—	October 21, 2001	Socorro	LINEAR	·	1.2 km	MPC · JPL
131536	2001 UW_{112}	—	October 21, 2001	Socorro	LINEAR	·	1.5 km	MPC · JPL
131537	2001 UV_{115}	—	October 22, 2001	Socorro	LINEAR	·	920 m	MPC · JPL
131538	2001 UH_{123}	—	October 22, 2001	Socorro	LINEAR	·	1.7 km	MPC · JPL
131539	2001 US_{133}	—	October 21, 2001	Socorro	LINEAR	L5	10 km	MPC · JPL
131540	2001 UX_{150}	—	October 23, 2001	Socorro	LINEAR	·	920 m	MPC · JPL
131541	2001 UE_{153}	—	October 23, 2001	Socorro	LINEAR	·	1.5 km	MPC · JPL
131542	2001 UH_{153}	—	October 23, 2001	Socorro	LINEAR	·	1.5 km	MPC · JPL
131543	2001 UZ_{163}	—	October 17, 2001	Haleakala	NEAT	·	970 m	MPC · JPL
131544	2001 UD_{177}	—	October 21, 2001	Socorro	LINEAR	·	4.7 km	MPC · JPL
131545	2001 UK_{209}	—	October 20, 2001	Palomar	NEAT	·	1.2 km	MPC · JPL
131546	2001 VJ_{3}	—	November 9, 2001	Kitt Peak	Spacewatch	L5	10 km	MPC · JPL
131547	2001 VD_{12}	—	November 10, 2001	Socorro	LINEAR	·	1.4 km	MPC · JPL
131548	2001 VF_{17}	—	November 11, 2001	Ondřejov	P. Pravec, P. Kušnirák	NYS	1.5 km	MPC · JPL
131549	2001 VJ_{21}	—	November 9, 2001	Socorro	LINEAR	·	1.3 km	MPC · JPL
131550	2001 VX_{21}	—	November 9, 2001	Socorro	LINEAR	·	1.3 km	MPC · JPL
131551	2001 VX_{23}	—	November 9, 2001	Socorro	LINEAR	·	1.4 km	MPC · JPL
131552	2001 VG_{27}	—	November 9, 2001	Socorro	LINEAR	·	1.2 km	MPC · JPL
131553	2001 VN_{29}	—	November 9, 2001	Socorro	LINEAR	·	1.1 km	MPC · JPL
131554	2001 VK_{31}	—	November 9, 2001	Socorro	LINEAR	·	1.3 km	MPC · JPL
131555	2001 VS_{32}	—	November 9, 2001	Socorro	LINEAR	·	1.2 km	MPC · JPL
131556	2001 VP_{33}	—	November 9, 2001	Socorro	LINEAR	·	1.1 km	MPC · JPL
131557	2001 VS_{34}	—	November 9, 2001	Socorro	LINEAR	·	1.3 km	MPC · JPL
131558	2001 VB_{36}	—	November 9, 2001	Socorro	LINEAR	·	1.4 km	MPC · JPL
131559	2001 VU_{37}	—	November 9, 2001	Socorro	LINEAR	PHO	1.7 km	MPC · JPL
131560	2001 VT_{41}	—	November 9, 2001	Socorro	LINEAR	·	1.3 km	MPC · JPL
131561	2001 VN_{42}	—	November 9, 2001	Socorro	LINEAR	·	1.5 km	MPC · JPL
131562	2001 VR_{42}	—	November 9, 2001	Socorro	LINEAR	·	1.4 km	MPC · JPL
131563	2001 VY_{44}	—	November 9, 2001	Socorro	LINEAR	·	1.7 km	MPC · JPL
131564	2001 VR_{45}	—	November 9, 2001	Socorro	LINEAR	·	1.6 km	MPC · JPL
131565	2001 VX_{48}	—	November 9, 2001	Socorro	LINEAR	·	1.7 km	MPC · JPL
131566	2001 VM_{52}	—	November 10, 2001	Socorro	LINEAR	·	1.4 km	MPC · JPL
131567	2001 VG_{60}	—	November 10, 2001	Socorro	LINEAR	·	1.0 km	MPC · JPL
131568	2001 VK_{61}	—	November 10, 2001	Socorro	LINEAR	·	1.4 km	MPC · JPL
131569	2001 VE_{63}	—	November 10, 2001	Socorro	LINEAR	·	950 m	MPC · JPL
131570	2001 VJ_{66}	—	November 10, 2001	Socorro	LINEAR	·	1.3 km	MPC · JPL
131571	2001 VM_{66}	—	November 10, 2001	Socorro	LINEAR	·	1.8 km	MPC · JPL
131572	2001 VT_{66}	—	November 10, 2001	Socorro	LINEAR	·	3.3 km	MPC · JPL
131573	2001 VX_{78}	—	November 9, 2001	Palomar	NEAT	·	1.2 km	MPC · JPL
131574	2001 VE_{86}	—	November 12, 2001	Socorro	LINEAR	·	1.2 km	MPC · JPL
131575	2001 VP_{86}	—	November 13, 2001	Socorro	LINEAR	·	12 km	MPC · JPL
131576	2001 VT_{86}	—	November 13, 2001	Socorro	LINEAR	·	7.7 km	MPC · JPL
131577	2001 VW_{111}	—	November 12, 2001	Socorro	LINEAR	·	1.6 km	MPC · JPL
131578	2001 VT_{113}	—	November 12, 2001	Socorro	LINEAR	·	1.3 km	MPC · JPL
131579	2001 VA_{120}	—	November 12, 2001	Socorro	LINEAR	·	1.1 km	MPC · JPL
131580	2001 VX_{120}	—	November 12, 2001	Socorro	LINEAR	(2076)	1.7 km	MPC · JPL
131581	2001 VG_{121}	—	November 15, 2001	Kitt Peak	Spacewatch	L5	10 km	MPC · JPL
131582	2001 WK_{4}	—	November 20, 2001	Socorro	LINEAR	·	1.3 km	MPC · JPL
131583	2001 WM_{4}	—	November 20, 2001	Socorro	LINEAR	H	1.3 km	MPC · JPL
131584	2001 WT_{5}	—	November 22, 2001	Oizumi	T. Kobayashi	·	2.9 km	MPC · JPL
131585	2001 WW_{7}	—	November 17, 2001	Socorro	LINEAR	·	1.1 km	MPC · JPL
131586	2001 WH_{8}	—	November 17, 2001	Socorro	LINEAR	·	1.0 km	MPC · JPL
131587	2001 WA_{10}	—	November 17, 2001	Socorro	LINEAR	·	1.2 km	MPC · JPL
131588	2001 WF_{28}	—	November 17, 2001	Socorro	LINEAR	·	1.2 km	MPC · JPL
131589	2001 WW_{35}	—	November 17, 2001	Socorro	LINEAR	·	990 m	MPC · JPL
131590	2001 WV_{39}	—	November 17, 2001	Socorro	LINEAR	·	1.3 km	MPC · JPL
131591	2001 WX_{52}	—	November 19, 2001	Socorro	LINEAR	·	930 m	MPC · JPL
131592	2001 WT_{64}	—	November 20, 2001	Socorro	LINEAR	H	940 m	MPC · JPL
131593	2001 WH_{99}	—	November 17, 2001	Socorro	LINEAR	·	2.0 km	MPC · JPL
131594	2001 WL_{99}	—	November 17, 2001	Socorro	LINEAR	·	1.7 km	MPC · JPL
131595	2001 WP_{100}	—	November 16, 2001	Kitt Peak	Spacewatch	·	1.1 km	MPC · JPL
131596	2001 XK	—	December 4, 2001	Socorro	LINEAR	·	4.5 km	MPC · JPL
131597	2001 XT_{2}	—	December 8, 2001	Socorro	LINEAR	PHO	4.7 km	MPC · JPL
131598	2001 XK_{6}	—	December 12, 2001	Palomar	NEAT	H	1.0 km	MPC · JPL
131599	2001 XM_{7}	—	December 7, 2001	Socorro	LINEAR	·	1.4 km	MPC · JPL
131600	2001 XG_{9}	—	December 9, 2001	Socorro	LINEAR	·	990 m	MPC · JPL

== 131601–131700 ==
back to top

Designation			Discovery			Properties		Ref
Permanent	Provisional	Named after	Date	Site	Discoverer(s)	Category	Diam.	Ref
131601	2001 XV_{9}	—	December 9, 2001	Socorro	LINEAR	·	2.7 km	MPC · JPL
131602	2001 XS_{16}	—	December 9, 2001	Socorro	LINEAR	·	2.8 km	MPC · JPL
131603	2001 XD_{18}	—	December 9, 2001	Socorro	LINEAR	ERI	3.3 km	MPC · JPL
131604	2001 XE_{18}	—	December 9, 2001	Socorro	LINEAR	·	2.1 km	MPC · JPL
131605	2001 XH_{18}	—	December 9, 2001	Socorro	LINEAR	·	1.7 km	MPC · JPL
131606	2001 XM_{18}	—	December 9, 2001	Socorro	LINEAR	·	1.6 km	MPC · JPL
131607	2001 XQ_{19}	—	December 9, 2001	Socorro	LINEAR	·	1.8 km	MPC · JPL
131608	2001 XV_{19}	—	December 9, 2001	Socorro	LINEAR	·	1.8 km	MPC · JPL
131609	2001 XJ_{21}	—	December 9, 2001	Socorro	LINEAR	·	1.8 km	MPC · JPL
131610	2001 XN_{22}	—	December 9, 2001	Socorro	LINEAR	·	1.3 km	MPC · JPL
131611	2001 XX_{22}	—	December 9, 2001	Socorro	LINEAR	·	1.9 km	MPC · JPL
131612	2001 XU_{24}	—	December 10, 2001	Socorro	LINEAR	·	1.7 km	MPC · JPL
131613	2001 XA_{27}	—	December 10, 2001	Socorro	LINEAR	·	2.4 km	MPC · JPL
131614	2001 XK_{27}	—	December 10, 2001	Socorro	LINEAR	·	1.5 km	MPC · JPL
131615	2001 XF_{28}	—	December 10, 2001	Socorro	LINEAR	·	2.2 km	MPC · JPL
131616	2001 XX_{29}	—	December 11, 2001	Socorro	LINEAR	·	2.1 km	MPC · JPL
131617	2001 XX_{31}	—	December 10, 2001	Socorro	LINEAR	·	1.2 km	MPC · JPL
131618	2001 XX_{33}	—	December 7, 2001	Socorro	LINEAR	MAS	1.3 km	MPC · JPL
131619	2001 XE_{40}	—	December 9, 2001	Socorro	LINEAR	V	1.2 km	MPC · JPL
131620	2001 XQ_{41}	—	December 9, 2001	Socorro	LINEAR	·	1.3 km	MPC · JPL
131621	2001 XP_{45}	—	December 9, 2001	Socorro	LINEAR	·	1.6 km	MPC · JPL
131622	2001 XE_{46}	—	December 9, 2001	Socorro	LINEAR	·	1.6 km	MPC · JPL
131623	2001 XG_{46}	—	December 9, 2001	Socorro	LINEAR	·	1.6 km	MPC · JPL
131624	2001 XF_{52}	—	December 10, 2001	Socorro	LINEAR	·	1.6 km	MPC · JPL
131625	2001 XN_{56}	—	December 10, 2001	Socorro	LINEAR	·	1.4 km	MPC · JPL
131626	2001 XR_{58}	—	December 10, 2001	Socorro	LINEAR	·	1.7 km	MPC · JPL
131627	2001 XF_{60}	—	December 10, 2001	Socorro	LINEAR	·	1.7 km	MPC · JPL
131628	2001 XX_{60}	—	December 10, 2001	Socorro	LINEAR	·	1.5 km	MPC · JPL
131629	2001 XB_{62}	—	December 10, 2001	Socorro	LINEAR	·	2.1 km	MPC · JPL
131630	2001 XO_{64}	—	December 10, 2001	Socorro	LINEAR	·	1.7 km	MPC · JPL
131631	2001 XQ_{66}	—	December 10, 2001	Socorro	LINEAR	·	2.3 km	MPC · JPL
131632	2001 XT_{66}	—	December 10, 2001	Socorro	LINEAR	·	1.7 km	MPC · JPL
131633	2001 XK_{67}	—	December 10, 2001	Socorro	LINEAR	·	1.9 km	MPC · JPL
131634	2001 XN_{68}	—	December 10, 2001	Socorro	LINEAR	·	2.6 km	MPC · JPL
131635	2001 XW_{71}	—	December 11, 2001	Socorro	LINEAR	L5	10 km	MPC · JPL
131636	2001 XJ_{72}	—	December 11, 2001	Socorro	LINEAR	MAS	1.0 km	MPC · JPL
131637	2001 XU_{72}	—	December 11, 2001	Socorro	LINEAR	·	1.4 km	MPC · JPL
131638	2001 XB_{73}	—	December 11, 2001	Socorro	LINEAR	·	1.8 km	MPC · JPL
131639	2001 XE_{76}	—	December 11, 2001	Socorro	LINEAR	·	950 m	MPC · JPL
131640	2001 XK_{77}	—	December 11, 2001	Socorro	LINEAR	·	2.4 km	MPC · JPL
131641	2001 XX_{82}	—	December 11, 2001	Socorro	LINEAR	·	1.2 km	MPC · JPL
131642	2001 XO_{85}	—	December 11, 2001	Socorro	LINEAR	·	2.2 km	MPC · JPL
131643	2001 XS_{85}	—	December 11, 2001	Socorro	LINEAR	NYS	1.5 km	MPC · JPL
131644	2001 XM_{86}	—	December 11, 2001	Socorro	LINEAR	·	1.6 km	MPC · JPL
131645	2001 XS_{87}	—	December 13, 2001	Socorro	LINEAR	·	1.2 km	MPC · JPL
131646	2001 XH_{88}	—	December 14, 2001	Desert Eagle	W. K. Y. Yeung	(2076)	2.0 km	MPC · JPL
131647	2001 XP_{90}	—	December 10, 2001	Socorro	LINEAR	·	4.9 km	MPC · JPL
131648	2001 XH_{99}	—	December 10, 2001	Socorro	LINEAR	·	3.9 km	MPC · JPL
131649	2001 XK_{101}	—	December 10, 2001	Socorro	LINEAR	·	1.4 km	MPC · JPL
131650	2001 XA_{103}	—	December 14, 2001	Socorro	LINEAR	·	1.6 km	MPC · JPL
131651	2001 XC_{105}	—	December 14, 2001	Kitt Peak	Spacewatch	·	1.5 km	MPC · JPL
131652	2001 XM_{105}	—	December 9, 2001	Socorro	LINEAR	·	1.4 km	MPC · JPL
131653	2001 XO_{106}	—	December 10, 2001	Socorro	LINEAR	·	1.5 km	MPC · JPL
131654	2001 XC_{107}	—	December 10, 2001	Socorro	LINEAR	·	1.8 km	MPC · JPL
131655	2001 XT_{112}	—	December 11, 2001	Socorro	LINEAR	·	2.4 km	MPC · JPL
131656	2001 XL_{114}	—	December 13, 2001	Socorro	LINEAR	·	1.6 km	MPC · JPL
131657	2001 XP_{114}	—	December 13, 2001	Socorro	LINEAR	·	2.9 km	MPC · JPL
131658	2001 XM_{118}	—	December 13, 2001	Socorro	LINEAR	·	1.4 km	MPC · JPL
131659	2001 XQ_{134}	—	December 14, 2001	Socorro	LINEAR	·	1.3 km	MPC · JPL
131660	2001 XM_{144}	—	December 14, 2001	Socorro	LINEAR	·	2.0 km	MPC · JPL
131661	2001 XX_{146}	—	December 14, 2001	Socorro	LINEAR	·	1.2 km	MPC · JPL
131662	2001 XX_{149}	—	December 14, 2001	Socorro	LINEAR	·	1.3 km	MPC · JPL
131663	2001 XE_{150}	—	December 14, 2001	Socorro	LINEAR	·	1.3 km	MPC · JPL
131664	2001 XZ_{164}	—	December 14, 2001	Socorro	LINEAR	·	1.6 km	MPC · JPL
131665	2001 XA_{167}	—	December 14, 2001	Socorro	LINEAR	·	1.5 km	MPC · JPL
131666	2001 XC_{167}	—	December 14, 2001	Socorro	LINEAR	·	1.8 km	MPC · JPL
131667	2001 XW_{168}	—	December 14, 2001	Socorro	LINEAR	·	2.0 km	MPC · JPL
131668	2001 XO_{171}	—	December 14, 2001	Socorro	LINEAR	·	1.3 km	MPC · JPL
131669	2001 XP_{175}	—	December 14, 2001	Socorro	LINEAR	·	1.7 km	MPC · JPL
131670	2001 XJ_{176}	—	December 14, 2001	Socorro	LINEAR	·	1.4 km	MPC · JPL
131671	2001 XQ_{176}	—	December 14, 2001	Socorro	LINEAR	·	1.8 km	MPC · JPL
131672	2001 XV_{177}	—	December 14, 2001	Socorro	LINEAR	V	1.1 km	MPC · JPL
131673	2001 XH_{179}	—	December 14, 2001	Socorro	LINEAR	·	1.3 km	MPC · JPL
131674	2001 XE_{183}	—	December 14, 2001	Socorro	LINEAR	·	1.1 km	MPC · JPL
131675	2001 XG_{184}	—	December 14, 2001	Socorro	LINEAR	·	2.2 km	MPC · JPL
131676	2001 XY_{184}	—	December 14, 2001	Socorro	LINEAR	V	1.5 km	MPC · JPL
131677	2001 XZ_{184}	—	December 14, 2001	Socorro	LINEAR	·	1.9 km	MPC · JPL
131678	2001 XV_{186}	—	December 14, 2001	Socorro	LINEAR	·	1.3 km	MPC · JPL
131679	2001 XY_{186}	—	December 14, 2001	Socorro	LINEAR	·	1.9 km	MPC · JPL
131680	2001 XK_{187}	—	December 14, 2001	Socorro	LINEAR	·	1.5 km	MPC · JPL
131681	2001 XK_{189}	—	December 14, 2001	Socorro	LINEAR	·	870 m	MPC · JPL
131682	2001 XX_{192}	—	December 14, 2001	Socorro	LINEAR	BAP	2.2 km	MPC · JPL
131683	2001 XP_{194}	—	December 14, 2001	Socorro	LINEAR	·	1.5 km	MPC · JPL
131684	2001 XG_{197}	—	December 14, 2001	Socorro	LINEAR	·	1.7 km	MPC · JPL
131685	2001 XH_{201}	—	December 10, 2001	Bergisch Gladbach	W. Bickel	·	3.5 km	MPC · JPL
131686	2001 XG_{204}	—	December 11, 2001	Socorro	LINEAR	·	3.7 km	MPC · JPL
131687	2001 XW_{206}	—	December 11, 2001	Socorro	LINEAR	·	1.3 km	MPC · JPL
131688	2001 XW_{207}	—	December 11, 2001	Socorro	LINEAR	·	1.2 km	MPC · JPL
131689	2001 XT_{209}	—	December 11, 2001	Socorro	LINEAR	·	1.3 km	MPC · JPL
131690	2001 XR_{214}	—	December 11, 2001	Socorro	LINEAR	·	1.9 km	MPC · JPL
131691	2001 XN_{232}	—	December 15, 2001	Socorro	LINEAR	·	1.7 km	MPC · JPL
131692	2001 XK_{233}	—	December 15, 2001	Socorro	LINEAR	NYS	2.0 km	MPC · JPL
131693	2001 XC_{239}	—	December 15, 2001	Socorro	LINEAR	·	1.4 km	MPC · JPL
131694	2001 XZ_{239}	—	December 15, 2001	Socorro	LINEAR	·	1.6 km	MPC · JPL
131695	2001 XS_{254}	—	December 9, 2001	Mauna Kea	S. S. Sheppard, Kleyna, J., D. C. Jewitt	other TNO	109 km	MPC · JPL
131696	2001 XT_{254}	—	December 9, 2001	Mauna Kea	S. S. Sheppard, Kleyna, J., D. C. Jewitt	res · 3:7	116 km	MPC · JPL
131697	2001 XH_{255}	—	December 11, 2001	Mauna Kea	Kleyna, J., S. S. Sheppard, D. C. Jewitt	res · 4:5	80 km	MPC · JPL
131698	2001 XS_{257}	—	December 7, 2001	Palomar	NEAT	·	1.0 km	MPC · JPL
131699	2001 YA	—	December 16, 2001	Oaxaca	Roe, J. M.	·	1.2 km	MPC · JPL
131700	2001 YN	—	December 17, 2001	Fountain Hills	C. W. Juels, P. R. Holvorcem	PHO	2.0 km	MPC · JPL

== 131701–131800 ==
back to top

Designation			Discovery			Properties		Ref
Permanent	Provisional	Named after	Date	Site	Discoverer(s)	Category	Diam.	Ref
131701	2001 YV	—	December 18, 2001	Kingsnake	J. V. McClusky	·	3.5 km	MPC · JPL
131702	2001 YZ_{3}	—	December 22, 2001	Socorro	LINEAR	·	4.8 km	MPC · JPL
131703	2001 YF_{9}	—	December 17, 2001	Socorro	LINEAR	·	1.4 km	MPC · JPL
131704	2001 YB_{10}	—	December 17, 2001	Socorro	LINEAR	NYS	1.9 km	MPC · JPL
131705	2001 YE_{11}	—	December 17, 2001	Socorro	LINEAR	·	1.5 km	MPC · JPL
131706	2001 YS_{18}	—	December 17, 2001	Socorro	LINEAR	·	2.2 km	MPC · JPL
131707	2001 YM_{39}	—	December 18, 2001	Socorro	LINEAR	·	1.3 km	MPC · JPL
131708	2001 YB_{44}	—	December 18, 2001	Socorro	LINEAR	·	1.1 km	MPC · JPL
131709	2001 YE_{49}	—	December 18, 2001	Socorro	LINEAR	·	3.3 km	MPC · JPL
131710	2001 YM_{50}	—	December 18, 2001	Socorro	LINEAR	·	1.9 km	MPC · JPL
131711	2001 YJ_{54}	—	December 18, 2001	Socorro	LINEAR	·	3.3 km	MPC · JPL
131712	2001 YE_{65}	—	December 18, 2001	Socorro	LINEAR	MAS	1.2 km	MPC · JPL
131713	2001 YN_{65}	—	December 18, 2001	Socorro	LINEAR	·	1.6 km	MPC · JPL
131714	2001 YZ_{70}	—	December 18, 2001	Socorro	LINEAR	·	2.8 km	MPC · JPL
131715	2001 YD_{71}	—	December 18, 2001	Socorro	LINEAR	·	1.4 km	MPC · JPL
131716	2001 YJ_{71}	—	December 18, 2001	Socorro	LINEAR	·	1.5 km	MPC · JPL
131717	2001 YL_{71}	—	December 18, 2001	Socorro	LINEAR	(2076)	2.3 km	MPC · JPL
131718	2001 YB_{72}	—	December 18, 2001	Socorro	LINEAR	·	1.5 km	MPC · JPL
131719	2001 YR_{77}	—	December 18, 2001	Socorro	LINEAR	·	2.2 km	MPC · JPL
131720	2001 YG_{78}	—	December 18, 2001	Socorro	LINEAR	NYS	1.9 km	MPC · JPL
131721	2001 YK_{80}	—	December 18, 2001	Socorro	LINEAR	·	1.6 km	MPC · JPL
131722	2001 YR_{82}	—	December 18, 2001	Socorro	LINEAR	·	2.2 km	MPC · JPL
131723	2001 YT_{82}	—	December 18, 2001	Socorro	LINEAR	·	1.4 km	MPC · JPL
131724	2001 YZ_{83}	—	December 18, 2001	Socorro	LINEAR	·	1.9 km	MPC · JPL
131725	2001 YB_{86}	—	December 18, 2001	Socorro	LINEAR	·	2.3 km	MPC · JPL
131726	2001 YS_{86}	—	December 18, 2001	Socorro	LINEAR	NYS ·	2.6 km	MPC · JPL
131727	2001 YH_{87}	—	December 18, 2001	Socorro	LINEAR	·	2.3 km	MPC · JPL
131728	2001 YJ_{87}	—	December 18, 2001	Socorro	LINEAR	NYS ·	3.7 km	MPC · JPL
131729	2001 YP_{91}	—	December 17, 2001	Palomar	NEAT	·	1.6 km	MPC · JPL
131730	2001 YE_{92}	—	December 18, 2001	Palomar	NEAT	·	2.1 km	MPC · JPL
131731	2001 YX_{94}	—	December 17, 2001	Palomar	NEAT	MAS	1.1 km	MPC · JPL
131732	2001 YC_{103}	—	December 17, 2001	Socorro	LINEAR	·	2.2 km	MPC · JPL
131733	2001 YY_{108}	—	December 18, 2001	Socorro	LINEAR	·	1.0 km	MPC · JPL
131734	2001 YK_{111}	—	December 18, 2001	Anderson Mesa	LONEOS	·	1.7 km	MPC · JPL
131735	2001 YG_{113}	—	December 19, 2001	Socorro	LINEAR	·	1.4 km	MPC · JPL
131736	2001 YB_{114}	—	December 19, 2001	Socorro	LINEAR	·	2.1 km	MPC · JPL
131737	2001 YD_{114}	—	December 19, 2001	Socorro	LINEAR	·	1.9 km	MPC · JPL
131738	2001 YF_{114}	—	December 19, 2001	Goodricke-Pigott	R. A. Tucker	PHO	2.4 km	MPC · JPL
131739	2001 YJ_{115}	—	December 17, 2001	Socorro	LINEAR	·	2.0 km	MPC · JPL
131740	2001 YH_{117}	—	December 18, 2001	Socorro	LINEAR	fast	2.1 km	MPC · JPL
131741	2001 YV_{121}	—	December 17, 2001	Socorro	LINEAR	·	1.1 km	MPC · JPL
131742	2001 YX_{121}	—	December 17, 2001	Socorro	LINEAR	·	1.4 km	MPC · JPL
131743	2001 YH_{125}	—	December 17, 2001	Socorro	LINEAR	·	1.3 km	MPC · JPL
131744	2001 YW_{125}	—	December 17, 2001	Socorro	LINEAR	·	1.6 km	MPC · JPL
131745	2001 YT_{130}	—	December 17, 2001	Socorro	LINEAR	·	1.1 km	MPC · JPL
131746	2001 YW_{130}	—	December 17, 2001	Socorro	LINEAR	·	2.0 km	MPC · JPL
131747	2001 YJ_{133}	—	December 21, 2001	Haleakala	NEAT	·	2.4 km	MPC · JPL
131748	2001 YU_{133}	—	December 20, 2001	Kitt Peak	Spacewatch	·	1.5 km	MPC · JPL
131749	2001 YE_{134}	—	December 17, 2001	Socorro	LINEAR	·	1.6 km	MPC · JPL
131750	2001 YS_{137}	—	December 22, 2001	Socorro	LINEAR	·	1.9 km	MPC · JPL
131751	2001 YT_{151}	—	December 19, 2001	Palomar	NEAT	·	1.7 km	MPC · JPL
131752	2001 YQ_{154}	—	December 19, 2001	Palomar	NEAT	·	1.5 km	MPC · JPL
131753	2001 YR_{154}	—	December 19, 2001	Palomar	NEAT	·	1.9 km	MPC · JPL
131754	2002 AO	—	January 5, 2002	Oizumi	T. Kobayashi	·	1.9 km	MPC · JPL
131755	2002 AN_{1}	—	January 6, 2002	Oizumi	T. Kobayashi	·	4.4 km	MPC · JPL
131756	2002 AQ_{1}	—	January 6, 2002	Oizumi	T. Kobayashi	·	3.8 km	MPC · JPL
131757	2002 AV_{2}	—	January 6, 2002	Socorro	LINEAR	PHO	1.9 km	MPC · JPL
131758	2002 AV_{5}	—	January 4, 2002	Haleakala	NEAT	·	3.9 km	MPC · JPL
131759	2002 AP_{8}	—	January 6, 2002	Kitt Peak	Spacewatch	·	1.5 km	MPC · JPL
131760	2002 AW_{9}	—	January 11, 2002	Desert Eagle	W. K. Y. Yeung	·	4.0 km	MPC · JPL
131761	2002 AB_{10}	—	January 11, 2002	Desert Eagle	W. K. Y. Yeung	NYS	2.4 km	MPC · JPL
131762 Csonka	2002 AD_{11}	Csonka	January 11, 2002	Piszkéstető	K. Sárneczky, Z. Heiner	·	1.4 km	MPC · JPL
131763 Donátbánki	2002 AJ_{11}	Donátbánki	January 11, 2002	Piszkéstető	K. Sárneczky, Z. Heiner	MAS	1.1 km	MPC · JPL
131764 Clauteodorescu	2002 AZ_{11}	Clauteodorescu	January 10, 2002	Campo Imperatore	CINEOS	·	1.1 km	MPC · JPL
131765 Raphaelschneider	2002 AF_{12}	Raphaelschneider	January 10, 2002	Campo Imperatore	CINEOS	·	1.9 km	MPC · JPL
131766 Silviaferrara	2002 AT_{12}	Silviaferrara	January 10, 2002	Campo Imperatore	CINEOS	·	2.3 km	MPC · JPL
131767 Stefanomancuso	2002 AZ_{12}	Stefanomancuso	January 11, 2002	Campo Imperatore	CINEOS	·	1.5 km	MPC · JPL
131768	2002 AB_{14}	—	January 12, 2002	Desert Eagle	W. K. Y. Yeung	·	2.8 km	MPC · JPL
131769	2002 AE_{15}	—	January 6, 2002	Socorro	LINEAR	PHO	4.3 km	MPC · JPL
131770	2002 AZ_{16}	—	January 5, 2002	Haleakala	NEAT	V	1.4 km	MPC · JPL
131771	2002 AB_{17}	—	January 5, 2002	Haleakala	NEAT	·	1.8 km	MPC · JPL
131772	2002 AV_{18}	—	January 13, 2002	Oizumi	T. Kobayashi	·	2.4 km	MPC · JPL
131773	2002 AW_{18}	—	January 13, 2002	Oizumi	T. Kobayashi	·	2.0 km	MPC · JPL
131774	2002 AZ_{18}	—	January 8, 2002	Haleakala	NEAT	slow	2.7 km	MPC · JPL
131775	2002 AF_{20}	—	January 5, 2002	Haleakala	NEAT	·	1.8 km	MPC · JPL
131776	2002 AM_{20}	—	January 5, 2002	Haleakala	NEAT	·	2.0 km	MPC · JPL
131777	2002 AE_{21}	—	January 8, 2002	Socorro	LINEAR	·	1.8 km	MPC · JPL
131778	2002 AL_{23}	—	January 5, 2002	Haleakala	NEAT	·	1.3 km	MPC · JPL
131779	2002 AO_{23}	—	January 5, 2002	Haleakala	NEAT	·	1.8 km	MPC · JPL
131780	2002 AM_{24}	—	January 8, 2002	Palomar	NEAT	·	1.4 km	MPC · JPL
131781	2002 AL_{25}	—	January 6, 2002	Palomar	NEAT	·	1.7 km	MPC · JPL
131782	2002 AZ_{26}	—	January 14, 2002	Desert Eagle	W. K. Y. Yeung	·	1.7 km	MPC · JPL
131783	2002 AE_{27}	—	January 14, 2002	Desert Eagle	W. K. Y. Yeung	·	3.6 km	MPC · JPL
131784	2002 AL_{27}	—	January 5, 2002	Anderson Mesa	LONEOS	·	1.5 km	MPC · JPL
131785	2002 AU_{27}	—	January 7, 2002	Anderson Mesa	LONEOS	·	1.9 km	MPC · JPL
131786	2002 AH_{28}	—	January 7, 2002	Anderson Mesa	LONEOS	·	990 m	MPC · JPL
131787	2002 AR_{29}	—	January 8, 2002	Socorro	LINEAR	·	1.6 km	MPC · JPL
131788	2002 AS_{30}	—	January 9, 2002	Socorro	LINEAR	·	1.4 km	MPC · JPL
131789	2002 AU_{34}	—	January 10, 2002	Palomar	NEAT	NYS	2.2 km	MPC · JPL
131790	2002 AH_{39}	—	January 9, 2002	Socorro	LINEAR	NYS	1.5 km	MPC · JPL
131791	2002 AU_{39}	—	January 9, 2002	Socorro	LINEAR	NYS	1.5 km	MPC · JPL
131792	2002 AC_{41}	—	January 9, 2002	Socorro	LINEAR	·	1.5 km	MPC · JPL
131793	2002 AF_{41}	—	January 9, 2002	Socorro	LINEAR	NYS	1.5 km	MPC · JPL
131794	2002 AJ_{46}	—	January 9, 2002	Socorro	LINEAR	MAS	1.2 km	MPC · JPL
131795	2002 AU_{50}	—	January 9, 2002	Socorro	LINEAR	·	1.1 km	MPC · JPL
131796	2002 AB_{51}	—	January 9, 2002	Socorro	LINEAR	NYS	1.6 km	MPC · JPL
131797	2002 AQ_{52}	—	January 9, 2002	Socorro	LINEAR	MAS	1.1 km	MPC · JPL
131798	2002 AV_{52}	—	January 9, 2002	Socorro	LINEAR	·	1.7 km	MPC · JPL
131799	2002 AD_{53}	—	January 9, 2002	Socorro	LINEAR	NYS	1.4 km	MPC · JPL
131800	2002 AM_{53}	—	January 9, 2002	Socorro	LINEAR	·	1 km	MPC · JPL

== 131801–131900 ==
back to top

Designation			Discovery			Properties		Ref
Permanent	Provisional	Named after	Date	Site	Discoverer(s)	Category	Diam.	Ref
131801	2002 AU_{53}	—	January 9, 2002	Socorro	LINEAR	·	2.2 km	MPC · JPL
131802	2002 AR_{56}	—	January 9, 2002	Socorro	LINEAR	·	1.1 km	MPC · JPL
131803	2002 AD_{59}	—	January 9, 2002	Socorro	LINEAR	·	1.7 km	MPC · JPL
131804	2002 AY_{62}	—	January 11, 2002	Socorro	LINEAR	·	2.9 km	MPC · JPL
131805	2002 AE_{64}	—	January 11, 2002	Socorro	LINEAR	·	1.9 km	MPC · JPL
131806	2002 AS_{66}	—	January 12, 2002	Socorro	LINEAR	·	2.0 km	MPC · JPL
131807	2002 AN_{75}	—	January 8, 2002	Socorro	LINEAR	NYS	2.1 km	MPC · JPL
131808	2002 AB_{77}	—	January 8, 2002	Socorro	LINEAR	·	960 m	MPC · JPL
131809	2002 AW_{85}	—	January 9, 2002	Socorro	LINEAR	·	1.9 km	MPC · JPL
131810	2002 AV_{86}	—	January 9, 2002	Socorro	LINEAR	·	1.4 km	MPC · JPL
131811	2002 AC_{87}	—	January 9, 2002	Socorro	LINEAR	·	2.3 km	MPC · JPL
131812	2002 AK_{87}	—	January 9, 2002	Socorro	LINEAR	·	1.8 km	MPC · JPL
131813	2002 AR_{87}	—	January 9, 2002	Socorro	LINEAR	·	2.3 km	MPC · JPL
131814	2002 AW_{87}	—	January 9, 2002	Socorro	LINEAR	·	1.8 km	MPC · JPL
131815	2002 AT_{88}	—	January 9, 2002	Socorro	LINEAR	·	1.7 km	MPC · JPL
131816	2002 AS_{89}	—	January 11, 2002	Socorro	LINEAR	·	2.5 km	MPC · JPL
131817	2002 AH_{90}	—	January 11, 2002	Socorro	LINEAR	·	3.0 km	MPC · JPL
131818	2002 AB_{91}	—	January 13, 2002	Socorro	LINEAR	·	3.4 km	MPC · JPL
131819	2002 AO_{93}	—	January 8, 2002	Socorro	LINEAR	·	920 m	MPC · JPL
131820	2002 AX_{93}	—	January 8, 2002	Socorro	LINEAR	·	1.0 km	MPC · JPL
131821	2002 AG_{95}	—	January 8, 2002	Socorro	LINEAR	NYS	1.6 km	MPC · JPL
131822	2002 AM_{96}	—	January 8, 2002	Socorro	LINEAR	·	950 m	MPC · JPL
131823	2002 AY_{97}	—	January 8, 2002	Socorro	LINEAR	·	1.7 km	MPC · JPL
131824	2002 AQ_{98}	—	January 8, 2002	Socorro	LINEAR	·	1.6 km	MPC · JPL
131825	2002 AP_{99}	—	January 8, 2002	Socorro	LINEAR	slow	1.7 km	MPC · JPL
131826	2002 AS_{101}	—	January 8, 2002	Socorro	LINEAR	·	1.5 km	MPC · JPL
131827	2002 AO_{102}	—	January 8, 2002	Socorro	LINEAR	·	1.3 km	MPC · JPL
131828	2002 AQ_{106}	—	January 9, 2002	Socorro	LINEAR	·	1.6 km	MPC · JPL
131829	2002 AM_{107}	—	January 9, 2002	Socorro	LINEAR	NYS	1.4 km	MPC · JPL
131830	2002 AQ_{107}	—	January 9, 2002	Socorro	LINEAR	V	1.3 km	MPC · JPL
131831	2002 AC_{108}	—	January 9, 2002	Socorro	LINEAR	MAS	1.1 km	MPC · JPL
131832	2002 AK_{108}	—	January 9, 2002	Socorro	LINEAR	·	1.5 km	MPC · JPL
131833	2002 AJ_{110}	—	January 9, 2002	Socorro	LINEAR	·	1.6 km	MPC · JPL
131834	2002 AO_{110}	—	January 9, 2002	Socorro	LINEAR	NYS	1.8 km	MPC · JPL
131835	2002 AJ_{113}	—	January 9, 2002	Socorro	LINEAR	·	1.1 km	MPC · JPL
131836	2002 AP_{113}	—	January 9, 2002	Socorro	LINEAR	NYS ·	3.1 km	MPC · JPL
131837	2002 AX_{113}	—	January 9, 2002	Socorro	LINEAR	·	2.2 km	MPC · JPL
131838	2002 AG_{115}	—	January 9, 2002	Socorro	LINEAR	·	2.1 km	MPC · JPL
131839	2002 AO_{116}	—	January 9, 2002	Socorro	LINEAR	EUN	2.2 km	MPC · JPL
131840	2002 AV_{116}	—	January 9, 2002	Socorro	LINEAR	NYS	1.9 km	MPC · JPL
131841	2002 AK_{117}	—	January 9, 2002	Socorro	LINEAR	V	1.1 km	MPC · JPL
131842	2002 AY_{117}	—	January 9, 2002	Socorro	LINEAR	·	2.1 km	MPC · JPL
131843	2002 AM_{118}	—	January 9, 2002	Socorro	LINEAR	·	2.8 km	MPC · JPL
131844	2002 AW_{119}	—	January 9, 2002	Socorro	LINEAR	·	1.6 km	MPC · JPL
131845	2002 AH_{120}	—	January 9, 2002	Socorro	LINEAR	NYS ·	2.0 km	MPC · JPL
131846	2002 AU_{120}	—	January 9, 2002	Socorro	LINEAR	·	1.1 km	MPC · JPL
131847	2002 AN_{121}	—	January 9, 2002	Socorro	LINEAR	·	2.4 km	MPC · JPL
131848	2002 AK_{123}	—	January 9, 2002	Socorro	LINEAR	·	2.0 km	MPC · JPL
131849	2002 AP_{125}	—	January 11, 2002	Socorro	LINEAR	·	2.5 km	MPC · JPL
131850	2002 AT_{125}	—	January 11, 2002	Socorro	LINEAR	ERI	3.7 km	MPC · JPL
131851	2002 AW_{125}	—	January 11, 2002	Socorro	LINEAR	·	4.3 km	MPC · JPL
131852	2002 AC_{128}	—	January 13, 2002	Socorro	LINEAR	·	1.1 km	MPC · JPL
131853	2002 AL_{129}	—	January 13, 2002	Needville	Needville	·	1.7 km	MPC · JPL
131854	2002 AK_{130}	—	January 12, 2002	Palomar	NEAT	·	2.0 km	MPC · JPL
131855	2002 AL_{132}	—	January 8, 2002	Socorro	LINEAR	MAS	1.2 km	MPC · JPL
131856	2002 AQ_{137}	—	January 9, 2002	Socorro	LINEAR	·	1.2 km	MPC · JPL
131857	2002 AY_{144}	—	January 13, 2002	Socorro	LINEAR	·	1.7 km	MPC · JPL
131858	2002 AC_{145}	—	January 13, 2002	Socorro	LINEAR	·	2.3 km	MPC · JPL
131859	2002 AS_{147}	—	January 14, 2002	Socorro	LINEAR	NYS	1.9 km	MPC · JPL
131860	2002 AN_{148}	—	January 11, 2002	Anderson Mesa	LONEOS	·	2.1 km	MPC · JPL
131861	2002 AS_{148}	—	January 11, 2002	Socorro	LINEAR	NYS	2.5 km	MPC · JPL
131862	2002 AA_{151}	—	January 14, 2002	Socorro	LINEAR	·	3.1 km	MPC · JPL
131863	2002 AG_{152}	—	January 14, 2002	Socorro	LINEAR	·	1.5 km	MPC · JPL
131864	2002 AM_{152}	—	January 14, 2002	Socorro	LINEAR	·	2.6 km	MPC · JPL
131865	2002 AD_{153}	—	January 14, 2002	Socorro	LINEAR	MAS	1.4 km	MPC · JPL
131866	2002 AG_{153}	—	January 14, 2002	Socorro	LINEAR	·	3.1 km	MPC · JPL
131867	2002 AA_{154}	—	January 14, 2002	Socorro	LINEAR	NYS	2.0 km	MPC · JPL
131868	2002 AW_{154}	—	January 14, 2002	Socorro	LINEAR	(5)	2.8 km	MPC · JPL
131869	2002 AJ_{155}	—	January 14, 2002	Socorro	LINEAR	MAS	1.7 km	MPC · JPL
131870	2002 AU_{156}	—	January 13, 2002	Socorro	LINEAR	·	1.9 km	MPC · JPL
131871	2002 AP_{157}	—	January 13, 2002	Socorro	LINEAR	·	1.5 km	MPC · JPL
131872	2002 AN_{158}	—	January 13, 2002	Socorro	LINEAR	·	2.1 km	MPC · JPL
131873	2002 AJ_{159}	—	January 13, 2002	Socorro	LINEAR	BAP	1.6 km	MPC · JPL
131874	2002 AP_{160}	—	January 13, 2002	Socorro	LINEAR	·	1.3 km	MPC · JPL
131875	2002 AR_{161}	—	January 13, 2002	Socorro	LINEAR	NYS ·	1.7 km	MPC · JPL
131876	2002 AZ_{161}	—	January 13, 2002	Socorro	LINEAR	NYS	1.9 km	MPC · JPL
131877	2002 AG_{163}	—	January 13, 2002	Socorro	LINEAR	·	1.5 km	MPC · JPL
131878	2002 AY_{163}	—	January 13, 2002	Socorro	LINEAR	NYS	2.0 km	MPC · JPL
131879	2002 AR_{164}	—	January 13, 2002	Socorro	LINEAR	·	1.8 km	MPC · JPL
131880	2002 AV_{164}	—	January 13, 2002	Socorro	LINEAR	V	1.1 km	MPC · JPL
131881	2002 AZ_{165}	—	January 13, 2002	Socorro	LINEAR	·	1.9 km	MPC · JPL
131882	2002 AA_{166}	—	January 13, 2002	Socorro	LINEAR	·	1.9 km	MPC · JPL
131883	2002 AF_{166}	—	January 13, 2002	Socorro	LINEAR	·	2.0 km	MPC · JPL
131884	2002 AJ_{166}	—	January 13, 2002	Socorro	LINEAR	·	2.4 km	MPC · JPL
131885	2002 AP_{168}	—	January 14, 2002	Socorro	LINEAR	MAS	1.1 km	MPC · JPL
131886	2002 AU_{168}	—	January 15, 2002	Socorro	LINEAR	·	1.1 km	MPC · JPL
131887	2002 AC_{175}	—	January 14, 2002	Socorro	LINEAR	·	3.5 km	MPC · JPL
131888	2002 AY_{177}	—	January 14, 2002	Socorro	LINEAR	·	1.7 km	MPC · JPL
131889	2002 AD_{179}	—	January 14, 2002	Socorro	LINEAR	·	1.2 km	MPC · JPL
131890	2002 AE_{179}	—	January 14, 2002	Socorro	LINEAR	·	1.8 km	MPC · JPL
131891	2002 AQ_{179}	—	January 14, 2002	Socorro	LINEAR	·	2.2 km	MPC · JPL
131892	2002 AJ_{182}	—	January 5, 2002	Palomar	NEAT	·	1.5 km	MPC · JPL
131893	2002 AW_{182}	—	January 5, 2002	Anderson Mesa	LONEOS	·	1.1 km	MPC · JPL
131894	2002 AK_{184}	—	January 7, 2002	Palomar	NEAT	·	1.4 km	MPC · JPL
131895	2002 AH_{186}	—	January 8, 2002	Socorro	LINEAR	·	1.6 km	MPC · JPL
131896	2002 AQ_{189}	—	January 10, 2002	Palomar	NEAT	·	2.9 km	MPC · JPL
131897	2002 AL_{198}	—	January 8, 2002	Palomar	NEAT	·	1.7 km	MPC · JPL
131898	2002 BB_{1}	—	January 19, 2002	Fountain Hills	C. W. Juels, P. R. Holvorcem	·	4.5 km	MPC · JPL
131899	2002 BC_{1}	—	January 19, 2002	Desert Eagle	W. K. Y. Yeung	·	830 m	MPC · JPL
131900	2002 BG_{1}	—	January 19, 2002	Desert Eagle	W. K. Y. Yeung	NYS	2.1 km	MPC · JPL

== 131901–132000 ==
back to top

Designation			Discovery			Properties		Ref
Permanent	Provisional	Named after	Date	Site	Discoverer(s)	Category	Diam.	Ref
131901	2002 BY_{1}	—	January 21, 2002	Desert Eagle	W. K. Y. Yeung	·	2.3 km	MPC · JPL
131902	2002 BA_{2}	—	January 21, 2002	Desert Eagle	W. K. Y. Yeung	·	3.4 km	MPC · JPL
131903	2002 BE_{7}	—	January 18, 2002	Socorro	LINEAR	V	1.3 km	MPC · JPL
131904	2002 BD_{8}	—	January 18, 2002	Socorro	LINEAR	·	2.5 km	MPC · JPL
131905	2002 BQ_{9}	—	January 18, 2002	Socorro	LINEAR	·	2.1 km	MPC · JPL
131906	2002 BA_{10}	—	January 18, 2002	Socorro	LINEAR	·	1.8 km	MPC · JPL
131907	2002 BG_{14}	—	January 19, 2002	Socorro	LINEAR	NYS	2.7 km	MPC · JPL
131908	2002 BO_{14}	—	January 19, 2002	Socorro	LINEAR	·	1.2 km	MPC · JPL
131909	2002 BX_{14}	—	January 19, 2002	Socorro	LINEAR	NYS	1.5 km	MPC · JPL
131910	2002 BR_{15}	—	January 19, 2002	Socorro	LINEAR	·	2.1 km	MPC · JPL
131911	2002 BC_{16}	—	January 19, 2002	Socorro	LINEAR	NYS	1.5 km	MPC · JPL
131912	2002 BQ_{16}	—	January 19, 2002	Socorro	LINEAR	NYS ·	3.2 km	MPC · JPL
131913	2002 BA_{17}	—	January 19, 2002	Socorro	LINEAR	·	2.7 km	MPC · JPL
131914	2002 BD_{17}	—	January 19, 2002	Socorro	LINEAR	EUN	3.2 km	MPC · JPL
131915	2002 BB_{18}	—	January 21, 2002	Socorro	LINEAR	·	1.4 km	MPC · JPL
131916	2002 BJ_{18}	—	January 21, 2002	Socorro	LINEAR	·	1.9 km	MPC · JPL
131917	2002 BM_{19}	—	January 21, 2002	Palomar	NEAT	·	1.8 km	MPC · JPL
131918	2002 BA_{20}	—	January 22, 2002	Socorro	LINEAR	·	3.7 km	MPC · JPL
131919	2002 BM_{24}	—	January 23, 2002	Socorro	LINEAR	·	2.0 km	MPC · JPL
131920	2002 BA_{27}	—	January 19, 2002	Socorro	LINEAR	·	1.7 km	MPC · JPL
131921	2002 BH_{27}	—	January 19, 2002	Anderson Mesa	LONEOS	·	1.6 km	MPC · JPL
131922	2002 BX_{28}	—	January 19, 2002	Anderson Mesa	LONEOS	·	2.4 km	MPC · JPL
131923	2002 CR_{1}	—	February 4, 2002	Badlands	Dyvig, R.	NYS	2.0 km	MPC · JPL
131924	2002 CT_{1}	—	February 3, 2002	Palomar	NEAT	·	2.7 km	MPC · JPL
131925	2002 CB_{2}	—	February 3, 2002	Palomar	NEAT	·	2.1 km	MPC · JPL
131926	2002 CQ_{2}	—	February 3, 2002	Palomar	NEAT	·	1.1 km	MPC · JPL
131927	2002 CE_{3}	—	February 3, 2002	Palomar	NEAT	·	3.7 km	MPC · JPL
131928	2002 CV_{4}	—	February 5, 2002	Fountain Hills	C. W. Juels, P. R. Holvorcem	·	2.1 km	MPC · JPL
131929	2002 CN_{5}	—	February 4, 2002	Palomar	NEAT	·	1.6 km	MPC · JPL
131930	2002 CC_{6}	—	February 4, 2002	Haleakala	NEAT	MAS	1.6 km	MPC · JPL
131931	2002 CQ_{8}	—	February 5, 2002	Palomar	NEAT	NYS	1.4 km	MPC · JPL
131932	2002 CB_{11}	—	February 6, 2002	Desert Eagle	W. K. Y. Yeung	·	2.3 km	MPC · JPL
131933	2002 CC_{13}	—	February 8, 2002	Fountain Hills	C. W. Juels, P. R. Holvorcem	·	2.3 km	MPC · JPL
131934	2002 CF_{13}	—	February 8, 2002	Fountain Hills	C. W. Juels, P. R. Holvorcem	·	5.0 km	MPC · JPL
131935	2002 CW_{13}	—	February 8, 2002	Desert Eagle	W. K. Y. Yeung	NYS ·	1.9 km	MPC · JPL
131936	2002 CQ_{14}	—	February 9, 2002	Nashville	Clingan, R.	·	2.1 km	MPC · JPL
131937	2002 CB_{15}	—	February 9, 2002	Desert Eagle	W. K. Y. Yeung	·	2.1 km	MPC · JPL
131938	2002 CC_{15}	—	February 9, 2002	Desert Eagle	W. K. Y. Yeung	·	1.4 km	MPC · JPL
131939	2002 CH_{15}	—	February 9, 2002	Desert Eagle	W. K. Y. Yeung	·	1.3 km	MPC · JPL
131940	2002 CR_{24}	—	February 6, 2002	Haleakala	NEAT	·	2.2 km	MPC · JPL
131941	2002 CB_{25}	—	February 7, 2002	Kitt Peak	Spacewatch	MAS	1.5 km	MPC · JPL
131942	2002 CC_{28}	—	February 6, 2002	Socorro	LINEAR	(1338) (FLO)	1.5 km	MPC · JPL
131943	2002 CS_{28}	—	February 6, 2002	Socorro	LINEAR	·	1.8 km	MPC · JPL
131944	2002 CF_{29}	—	February 6, 2002	Socorro	LINEAR	·	2.2 km	MPC · JPL
131945	2002 CL_{29}	—	February 6, 2002	Socorro	LINEAR	·	2.7 km	MPC · JPL
131946	2002 CQ_{30}	—	February 6, 2002	Socorro	LINEAR	·	1.7 km	MPC · JPL
131947	2002 CM_{31}	—	February 6, 2002	Socorro	LINEAR	·	1.6 km	MPC · JPL
131948	2002 CS_{31}	—	February 6, 2002	Socorro	LINEAR	·	2.3 km	MPC · JPL
131949	2002 CC_{33}	—	February 6, 2002	Socorro	LINEAR	·	1.5 km	MPC · JPL
131950	2002 CO_{33}	—	February 6, 2002	Socorro	LINEAR	V	920 m	MPC · JPL
131951	2002 CS_{33}	—	February 6, 2002	Socorro	LINEAR	·	1.2 km	MPC · JPL
131952	2002 CQ_{34}	—	February 6, 2002	Socorro	LINEAR	·	1.7 km	MPC · JPL
131953	2002 CB_{36}	—	February 7, 2002	Socorro	LINEAR	NYS ·	2.0 km	MPC · JPL
131954	2002 CD_{36}	—	February 7, 2002	Socorro	LINEAR	NYS	2.1 km	MPC · JPL
131955	2002 CS_{36}	—	February 7, 2002	Socorro	LINEAR	·	1.2 km	MPC · JPL
131956	2002 CK_{37}	—	February 7, 2002	Socorro	LINEAR	MAS	1.6 km	MPC · JPL
131957	2002 CG_{39}	—	February 11, 2002	Desert Eagle	W. K. Y. Yeung	·	2.0 km	MPC · JPL
131958	2002 CS_{41}	—	February 7, 2002	Haleakala	NEAT	·	1.9 km	MPC · JPL
131959	2002 CJ_{42}	—	February 7, 2002	Haleakala	NEAT	·	2.9 km	MPC · JPL
131960	2002 CB_{43}	—	February 12, 2002	Fountain Hills	C. W. Juels, P. R. Holvorcem	·	2.3 km	MPC · JPL
131961	2002 CD_{43}	—	February 12, 2002	Fountain Hills	C. W. Juels, P. R. Holvorcem	·	4.7 km	MPC · JPL
131962	2002 CG_{45}	—	February 8, 2002	Kitt Peak	Spacewatch	·	1.6 km	MPC · JPL
131963	2002 CT_{49}	—	February 3, 2002	Haleakala	NEAT	V	1.2 km	MPC · JPL
131964	2002 CY_{49}	—	February 3, 2002	Haleakala	NEAT	·	1.8 km	MPC · JPL
131965	2002 CU_{50}	—	February 12, 2002	Desert Eagle	W. K. Y. Yeung	·	1.3 km	MPC · JPL
131966	2002 CP_{51}	—	February 12, 2002	Desert Eagle	W. K. Y. Yeung	·	2.2 km	MPC · JPL
131967	2002 CR_{52}	—	February 12, 2002	Fountain Hills	C. W. Juels, P. R. Holvorcem	V	1.6 km	MPC · JPL
131968	2002 CY_{52}	—	February 7, 2002	Socorro	LINEAR	·	1.6 km	MPC · JPL
131969	2002 CG_{53}	—	February 7, 2002	Socorro	LINEAR	·	2.6 km	MPC · JPL
131970	2002 CW_{53}	—	February 7, 2002	Socorro	LINEAR	NYS	2.0 km	MPC · JPL
131971	2002 CQ_{54}	—	February 7, 2002	Socorro	LINEAR	·	1.7 km	MPC · JPL
131972	2002 CG_{56}	—	February 7, 2002	Socorro	LINEAR	·	2.4 km	MPC · JPL
131973	2002 CK_{56}	—	February 7, 2002	Socorro	LINEAR	NYS	2.4 km	MPC · JPL
131974	2002 CQ_{57}	—	February 7, 2002	Socorro	LINEAR	NYS	2.3 km	MPC · JPL
131975	2002 CB_{58}	—	February 7, 2002	Kitt Peak	Spacewatch	·	1.2 km	MPC · JPL
131976	2002 CM_{61}	—	February 6, 2002	Socorro	LINEAR	·	2.3 km	MPC · JPL
131977	2002 CB_{62}	—	February 6, 2002	Socorro	LINEAR	·	2.4 km	MPC · JPL
131978	2002 CE_{62}	—	February 6, 2002	Socorro	LINEAR	·	2.5 km	MPC · JPL
131979	2002 CJ_{64}	—	February 6, 2002	Socorro	LINEAR	·	1.8 km	MPC · JPL
131980	2002 CG_{70}	—	February 7, 2002	Socorro	LINEAR	·	1.2 km	MPC · JPL
131981	2002 CQ_{72}	—	February 7, 2002	Socorro	LINEAR	·	1.1 km	MPC · JPL
131982	2002 CQ_{73}	—	February 7, 2002	Socorro	LINEAR	·	1.4 km	MPC · JPL
131983	2002 CH_{77}	—	February 7, 2002	Socorro	LINEAR	MAS	1.1 km	MPC · JPL
131984	2002 CZ_{77}	—	February 7, 2002	Socorro	LINEAR	NYS	2.5 km	MPC · JPL
131985	2002 CL_{80}	—	February 7, 2002	Socorro	LINEAR	MAS	1.2 km	MPC · JPL
131986	2002 CF_{81}	—	February 7, 2002	Socorro	LINEAR	ERI	1.8 km	MPC · JPL
131987	2002 CR_{82}	—	February 7, 2002	Socorro	LINEAR	KOR	2.7 km	MPC · JPL
131988	2002 CS_{83}	—	February 7, 2002	Socorro	LINEAR	·	2.3 km	MPC · JPL
131989	2002 CF_{87}	—	February 7, 2002	Socorro	LINEAR	·	1.4 km	MPC · JPL
131990	2002 CX_{89}	—	February 7, 2002	Socorro	LINEAR	NYS	1.5 km	MPC · JPL
131991	2002 CU_{92}	—	February 7, 2002	Socorro	LINEAR	·	2.7 km	MPC · JPL
131992	2002 CE_{94}	—	February 7, 2002	Socorro	LINEAR	MAS	1.6 km	MPC · JPL
131993	2002 CQ_{94}	—	February 7, 2002	Socorro	LINEAR	·	1.8 km	MPC · JPL
131994	2002 CH_{95}	—	February 7, 2002	Socorro	LINEAR	·	2.8 km	MPC · JPL
131995	2002 CT_{95}	—	February 7, 2002	Socorro	LINEAR	NYS	2.0 km	MPC · JPL
131996	2002 CC_{96}	—	February 7, 2002	Socorro	LINEAR	NYS	2.3 km	MPC · JPL
131997	2002 CM_{97}	—	February 7, 2002	Socorro	LINEAR	·	1.5 km	MPC · JPL
131998	2002 CP_{97}	—	February 7, 2002	Socorro	LINEAR	MAS	1.6 km	MPC · JPL
131999	2002 CT_{97}	—	February 7, 2002	Socorro	LINEAR	NYS	2.5 km	MPC · JPL
132000	2002 CZ_{97}	—	February 7, 2002	Socorro	LINEAR	·	2.7 km	MPC · JPL

back to top

== See also ==
- Meanings of minor-planet names: 131001–132000
