= Meanings of minor-planet names: 131001–132000 =

As minor planet discoveries are confirmed, they are given a permanent number by the IAU's Minor Planet Center (MPC), and the discoverers can then submit names for them, following the IAU's naming conventions. The list below concerns those minor planets in the specified number-range that have received names, and explains the meanings of those names.

Official naming citations of newly named small Solar System bodies are approved and published in a bulletin by IAU's Working Group for Small Bodies Nomenclature (WGSBN). Before May 2021, citations were published in MPC's Minor Planet Circulars for many decades. Recent citations can also be found on the JPL Small-Body Database (SBDB). Until his death in 2016, German astronomer Lutz D. Schmadel compiled these citations into the Dictionary of Minor Planet Names (DMP) and regularly updated the collection.

Based on Paul Herget's The Names of the Minor Planets, Schmadel also researched the unclear origin of numerous asteroids, most of which had been named prior to World War II. This article incorporates text from this source, which is in the public domain: SBDB New namings may only be added to this list below after official publication as the preannouncement of names is condemned. The WGSBN publishes a comprehensive guideline for the naming rules of non-cometary small Solar System bodies.

== 131001–131100 ==
Named minor planet	Provisional	This minor planet was named for...	Ref · Catalog
There are no named minor planets in this number range

== 131101–131200 ==
back to top

Named minor planet	Provisional	This minor planet was named for...	Ref · Catalog
131181 Žebrák	2001 CT_{41}	Žebrák is a historic town in Central Bohemia, Czech Republic, known for its medieval castles of Žebrák and Točník, a meteorite fall in 1824, and its creative astronomical observatory active in the field of public education.	IAU · 131181
131186 Pauluckas	2001 DS	Paul Luckas (born 1962), Australian amateur astronomer, discoverer of minor planets and supernovae	JPL · 131186

== 131201–131300 ==
back to top

Named minor planet	Provisional	This minor planet was named for...	Ref · Catalog
131245 Bakich	2001 FF_{1}	Michael E. Bakich (born 1953), American historian of astronomy, author, and senior editor of Astronomy	JPL · 131245

== 131301–131400 ==
back to top

Named minor planet	Provisional	This minor planet was named for...	Ref · Catalog
131358 Kamolergashev	2001 KA_{2}	Kamoliddin Ergashev, Uzbek astronomer at the Ulugh Beg Astronomical Institute.	IAU · 131358

== 131401–131500 ==
back to top

Named minor planet	Provisional	This minor planet was named for...	Ref · Catalog
There are no named minor planets in this number range

== 131501–131600 ==
back to top

Named minor planet	Provisional	This minor planet was named for...	Ref · Catalog
There are no named minor planets in this number range

== 131601–131700 ==
back to top

Named minor planet	Provisional	This minor planet was named for...	Ref · Catalog
There are no named minor planets in this number range

== 131701–131800 ==
back to top

Named minor planet	Provisional	This minor planet was named for...	Ref · Catalog
131762 Csonka	2002 AD_{11}	János Csonka (1852–1939), Hungarian engineer, inventor of the first Hungarian gas engine and co-inventor of the carburetor with Donát Bánki (this minor planet was discovered on the 150th anniversary of his birth)	JPL · 131762
131763 Donátbánki	2002 AJ_{11}	Donát Bánki (1859–1922), Hungarian mechanical engineer, co-inventor, with János Csonka, of the carburetor in 1893	JPL · 131763
131764 Clauteodorescu	2002 AZ_{11}	Claudiu Teodorescu, Romanian software engineer.	IAU · 131764
131765 Raphaelschneider	2002 AF_{12}	Raphael Schneider, German software engineer.	IAU · 131765
131766 Silviaferrara	2002 AT_{12}	Silvia Ferrara, Italian Professor of Aegean Philology at Bologna University, Principal Investigator of the Projects INSCRIBE and SAPIENCE	IAU · 131766
131767 Stefanomancuso	2002 AZ_{12}	Stefano Mancuso, Italian neuroscientist at Florence University and Director of the International Laboratory of Plant Neurobiology.	IAU · 131767

== 131801–131900 ==
back to top

Named minor planet	Provisional	This minor planet was named for...	Ref · Catalog
There are no named minor planets in this number range

== 131901–132000 ==
back to top

Named minor planet	Provisional	This minor planet was named for...	Ref · Catalog
There are no named minor planets in this number range

back to top

Preceded by 130,001–131,000	Meanings of minor-planet names List of minor planets: 131,001–132,000	Succeeded by 132,001–133,000
