= Dominik Brunner =

- Born: May 18, 1959; Stuttgart, West Germany
- Died: September 12, 2009 (aged 50); Munich, Germany
- Occupation: Businessman (CFO of Erlus AG)
- Known for: Dying while protecting schoolchildren from an attack
- Awards: Bavarian Order of Merit; Federal Cross of Merit

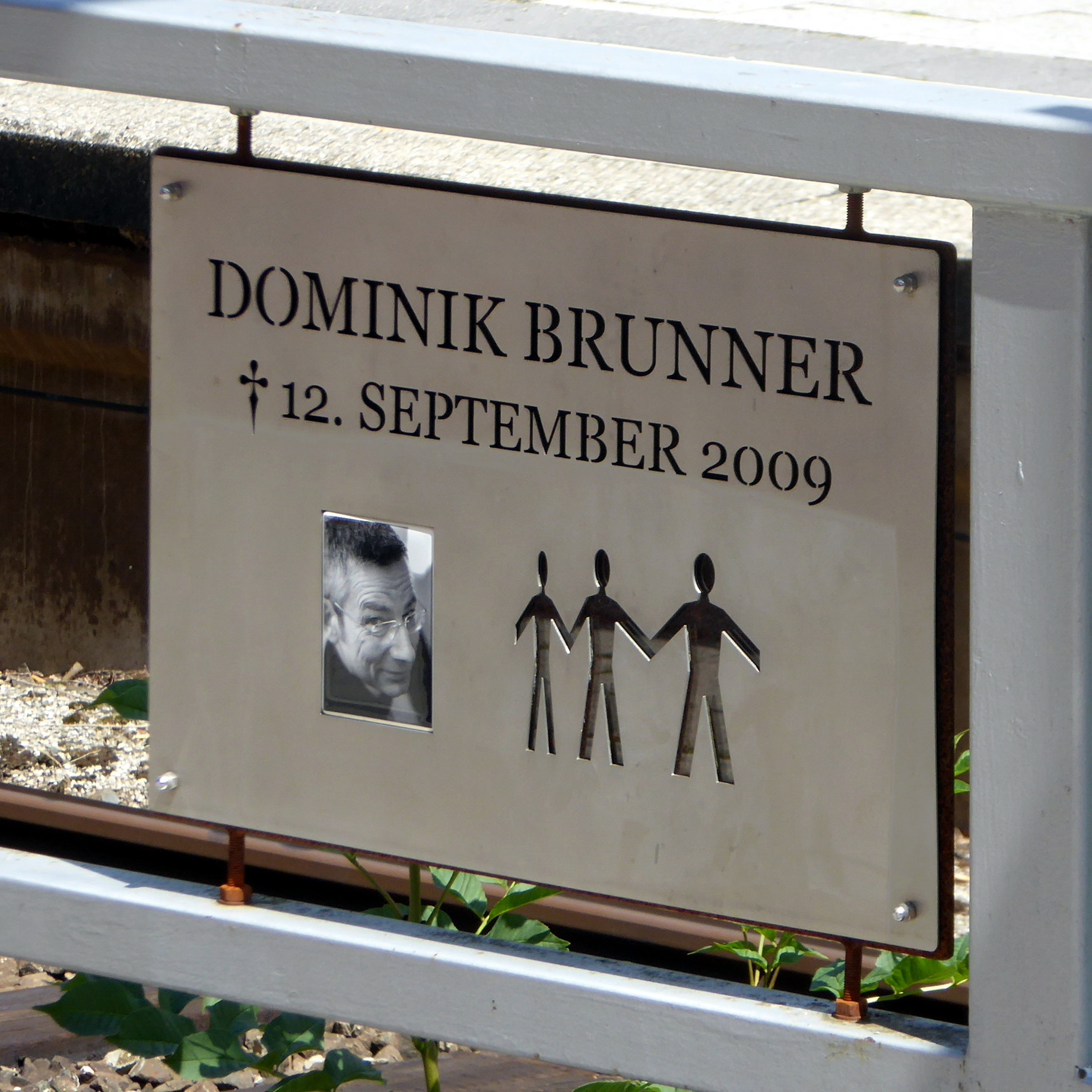
Commemorative plaque for Dominik Brunner at the platform of Munich-Solln station.

Dominik Florian Brunner (born 18 May 1959 in Stuttgart, died 12 September 2009 in Munich) was a German businessman. He was the CFO of Erlus AG, Germany’s largest roof tile manufacturer, and died in a fight which resulted from Brunner trying to protect a group of school children from attacks by teenagers.

== Biography ==
Brunner was born to a family of entrepreneurs. His father, Oscar Brunner, was the finance manager of one of Germany's largest roof tile manufacturers, Erlus AG. After receiving his Abitur in Landshut, Brunner studied law at LMU Munich and worked in office positions in San Francisco and Paris. He followed in his father's footsteps when he took a leading position at Erlus AG. His fields of responsibility included finance, organization, personnel, law and purchases.

In the 1990s, Brunner trained in kickboxing at Boxclub Straubing, but gave up the hobby after he noticed more and more young men arriving at the club to learn how to beat others.

== Death ==
On 12 September 2009, four school children were being threatened on a Munich S-Bahn train by two older teenagers, Markus Schiller and Sebastian Leibinger, who tried to rob and mug them. When Brunner and the young teens arrived at München Solln station, Brunner was punched and kicked over 20 times. He eventually died on-site due to a pre-existing heart condition.

Schiller and Leibinger were charged with murder. In the court case, it was proven that Brunner became involved with the aim of protecting the school children, but questions were raised whether he died due to the brutal beating by the accused, and there were differing versions of how the fight between Brunner and the accused started. When the accused were threatening the children, Brunner asked them to stop, or he would call the police. The accused did not listen, so Brunner informed the police. He then asked the children to "stay away", took up a combat position and started to hit and fight the accused. However, according to another witness, Brunner approached the accused, shouted "this is what you want", and then hit Markus Schiller in the face. Although he was described as a hero in early media reports, there was discussion later regarding how much blame for starting the fight lies with Brunner himself.

The court pronounced judgement on 6 September 2010: Schiller, who had by then turned 19, was sentenced to 9 years and 10 months in a youth facility as a primary accomplice in an attempted robbery with violence leading to murder; Leibinger was sentenced to 7 years in a youth facility as a primary accomplice in an attempted robbery with violence leading to grievous bodily harm resulting in death. The Federal Court of Justice rejected the defence appeal.

== Awards and honors ==
- Brunner was posthumously awarded the Bavarian Order of Merit (Bayerischer Verdienstorden) by Minister-President of Bavaria Horst Seehofer, and the Federal Cross of Merit by German President Horst Köhler.
- Asteroid 192293 Dominikbrunner, discovered by Freimut Börngen in 1990, was named in his memory. The official naming citation was published by the Minor Planet Center on 30 March 2010 (M.P.C. 69495).
