= Meanings of minor-planet names: 192001–193000 =

As minor planet discoveries are confirmed, they are given a permanent number by the IAU's Minor Planet Center (MPC), and the discoverers can then submit names for them, following the IAU's naming conventions. The list below concerns those minor planets in the specified number-range that have received names, and explains the meanings of those names.

Official naming citations of newly named small Solar System bodies are approved and published in a bulletin by IAU's Working Group for Small Bodies Nomenclature (WGSBN). Before May 2021, citations were published in MPC's Minor Planet Circulars for many decades. Recent citations can also be found on the JPL Small-Body Database (SBDB). Until his death in 2016, German astronomer Lutz D. Schmadel compiled these citations into the Dictionary of Minor Planet Names (DMP) and regularly updated the collection.

Based on Paul Herget's The Names of the Minor Planets, Schmadel also researched the unclear origin of numerous asteroids, most of which had been named prior to World War II. This article incorporates text from this source, which is in the public domain: SBDB New namings may only be added to this list below after official publication as the preannouncement of names is condemned. The WGSBN publishes a comprehensive guideline for the naming rules of non-cometary small Solar System bodies.

== 192001–192100 ==
Named minor planet	Provisional	This minor planet was named for...	Ref · Catalog
192001 Raynatedford	2005 XG_{112}	Rayna M. Tedford (born 1960), scientist with the Southwest Research Institute, who worked for the New Horizons mission to Pluto as the Pluto Encounter Deputy Logistics Lead	JPL · 192001

== 192101–192200 ==
back to top

Named minor planet	Provisional	This minor planet was named for...	Ref · Catalog
192155 Hargittai	2006 HZ_{17}	Magdolna Hargittai and István Hargittai, Hungarian chemists and members of the Hungarian Academy of Sciences, whose research is structural chemistry. In 2011, they received the annual science communication award of the Club of Hungarian Science Journalists.	JPL · 192155
192158 Christian	2006 XF_{4}	Christian Apitzsch (born 1968), son of German amateur astronomer Rolf Apitzsch who discovered this minor planet	JPL · 192158
192178 Lijieshou	2007 EA_{200}	Li Jieshou (born 1924), an academician of Chinese Engineering Academy, is the founder of surgical nutriology and therapies of refractory gastrointestinal disease in China.	JPL · 192178
192182 Ennedi	2007 EP_{217}	Ennedi Plateau, a remote sandstone massif in northeastern Chad, is famous for its dramatic landscapes and its displays of prehistoric rock paintings.	IAU · 192182

== 192201–192300 ==
back to top

Named minor planet	Provisional	This minor planet was named for...	Ref · Catalog
192208 Tzu Chi	2007 JX_{33}	The Buddhist Compassion Relief Tzu Chi Foundation, established in Taiwan in 1966, has grown to be an international humanitarian organization with over 10 million members in 47 countries	JPL · 192208
192220 Oicles	2007 RZ_{132}	Oicles (Oecles), from Greek mythology. He was an Argive king, father of Amphiaraus and son of Mantius.	JPL · 192220
192291 Palindrome	1990 QX_{19}	A palindrome is a word, number, phrase, or other sequence of characters which reads the same backward as forward, of which the permanent number of this minor planet is an example.	IAU · 192291
192293 Dominikbrunner	1990 TA_{2}	Dominik Brunner (1959–2009), Bavarian entrepreneur, killed in a fight which resulted from Brunner trying to protect a group of school children from attacks by teenagers	JPL · 192293

== 192301–192400 ==
back to top

Named minor planet	Provisional	This minor planet was named for...	Ref · Catalog
192353 Wangdazhong	1995 TS_{1}	Wang Dazhong (b. 1935), a Chinese nuclear reactor engineer, an educator, and an Academician of the Chinese Academy of Sciences.	IAU · 192353
192391 Yunda	1996 TQ_{2}	Yunda (Yunnan University).	IAU · 192391

== 192401–192500 ==
back to top

Named minor planet	Provisional	This minor planet was named for...	Ref · Catalog
192439 Cílek	1997 VC	Václav Cílek (born 1955), Czech geologist, climatologist, writer, philosopher and science popularizer	JPL · 192439
192450 Xinjiangdaxue	1997 WY_{21}	The Xinjiang University (Xinjiangdaxue) was founded in 1924 and is one of the national key comprehensive universities. It is listed as a comprehensive university for further development in the Great West Project of China.	JPL · 192450

== 192501–192600 ==
back to top

Named minor planet	Provisional	This minor planet was named for...	Ref · Catalog
192515 Xinanjiaoda	1998 RS_{15}	Founded in 1896, Southwest Jiaotong University (SWJTU, abbreviated as Xinanjiaoda) is a national key university that is listed on China’s “211 Project” and “Double First-class Initiative”. The university established its Astrophysical Center in 1998.	IAU · 192515

== 192601–192700 ==
back to top

Named minor planet	Provisional	This minor planet was named for...	Ref · Catalog
192609 Orlaparker	1999 GY_{3}	Orla Maria Parker (b. 2026) is the first granddaughter of the discoverer.	IAU · 192609
192626 Glennunderhill	1999 JR_{133}	Glenn Underhill (1926–2003), American educator and physicist.	JPL · 192626
192686 Aljuroma	1999 TU_{17}	Alexandra, Juri, Robin and Marlene, grandchildren of German amateur astronomer Norbert Ehring who discovered this Mars-crossing asteroid	JPL · 192686

== 192701–192800 ==
back to top

Named minor planet	Provisional	This minor planet was named for...	Ref · Catalog
There are no named minor planets in this number range

== 192801–192900 ==
back to top

Named minor planet	Provisional	This minor planet was named for...	Ref · Catalog
There are no named minor planets in this number range

== 192901–193000 ==
back to top

Named minor planet	Provisional	This minor planet was named for...	Ref · Catalog
There are no named minor planets in this number range

back to top

Preceded by 191,001–192,000	Meanings of minor-planet names List of minor planets: 192,001–193,000	Succeeded by 193,001–194,000
