= List of minor planets: 192001–193000 =

The following is a partial list of minor planets, running from minor-planet number 192001 through 193000, inclusive. The primary data for this and other partial lists is based on JPL's "Small-Body Orbital Elements" and data available from the Minor Planet Center. Critical list information is also provided by the MPC, unless otherwise specified from Lowell Observatory. A detailed description of the table's columns and additional sources are given on the main page including a complete list of every page in this series, and a statistical break-up on the dynamical classification of minor planets.

Also see the summary list of all named bodies in numerical and alphabetical order, and the corresponding naming citations for the number range of this particular list. New namings may only be added to this list after official publication, as the preannouncement of names is condemned by the Working Group for Small Bodies Nomenclature of the International Astronomical Union.

Near-Earth obj.	MBA (inner)	MBA (outer)	Centaur
Mars-crosser	MBA (middle)	Jupiter trojan	Trans-Neptunian obj.
Unclassified

== 192001–192100 ==
Designation			Discovery			Properties		Ref
Permanent	Provisional	Named after	Date	Site	Discoverer(s)	Category	Diam.	Ref
192001 Raynatedford	2005 XG_{112}	Raynatedford	December 2, 2005	Kitt Peak	M. W. Buie	·	3.0 km	MPC · JPL
192002	2005 XB_{117}	—	December 1, 2005	Mount Lemmon	Mount Lemmon Survey	·	1.7 km	MPC · JPL
192003	2005 YH_{1}	—	December 21, 2005	Catalina	CSS	·	2.0 km	MPC · JPL
192004	2005 YH_{24}	—	December 24, 2005	Kitt Peak	Spacewatch	·	1.8 km	MPC · JPL
192005	2005 YZ_{24}	—	December 24, 2005	Kitt Peak	Spacewatch	·	1.5 km	MPC · JPL
192006	2005 YO_{29}	—	December 24, 2005	Kitt Peak	Spacewatch	·	1.7 km	MPC · JPL
192007	2005 YO_{33}	—	December 24, 2005	Kitt Peak	Spacewatch	·	2.0 km	MPC · JPL
192008	2005 YJ_{35}	—	December 25, 2005	Kitt Peak	Spacewatch	NYS	1.9 km	MPC · JPL
192009	2005 YG_{41}	—	December 21, 2005	Kitt Peak	Spacewatch	·	1.4 km	MPC · JPL
192010	2005 YA_{42}	—	December 22, 2005	Kitt Peak	Spacewatch	·	1.7 km	MPC · JPL
192011	2005 YP_{42}	—	December 24, 2005	Kitt Peak	Spacewatch	·	3.7 km	MPC · JPL
192012	2005 YT_{60}	—	December 22, 2005	Kitt Peak	Spacewatch	·	2.2 km	MPC · JPL
192013	2005 YR_{61}	—	December 24, 2005	Kitt Peak	Spacewatch	·	3.2 km	MPC · JPL
192014	2005 YV_{66}	—	December 25, 2005	Kitt Peak	Spacewatch	·	3.0 km	MPC · JPL
192015	2005 YU_{70}	—	December 27, 2005	Mount Lemmon	Mount Lemmon Survey	·	1.4 km	MPC · JPL
192016	2005 YP_{72}	—	December 24, 2005	Kitt Peak	Spacewatch	·	1.6 km	MPC · JPL
192017	2005 YB_{77}	—	December 24, 2005	Kitt Peak	Spacewatch	·	7.1 km	MPC · JPL
192018	2005 YV_{109}	—	December 25, 2005	Kitt Peak	Spacewatch	·	3.2 km	MPC · JPL
192019	2005 YA_{116}	—	December 25, 2005	Kitt Peak	Spacewatch	NYS	2.1 km	MPC · JPL
192020	2005 YJ_{148}	—	December 25, 2005	Kitt Peak	Spacewatch	·	1.5 km	MPC · JPL
192021	2005 YN_{148}	—	December 25, 2005	Kitt Peak	Spacewatch	·	2.9 km	MPC · JPL
192022	2005 YG_{158}	—	December 27, 2005	Kitt Peak	Spacewatch	NYS	2.2 km	MPC · JPL
192023	2005 YK_{175}	—	December 22, 2005	Kitt Peak	Spacewatch	·	2.8 km	MPC · JPL
192024	2005 YA_{176}	—	December 22, 2005	Kitt Peak	Spacewatch	AGN	1.7 km	MPC · JPL
192025	2005 YH_{193}	—	December 30, 2005	Kitt Peak	Spacewatch	AGN	1.9 km	MPC · JPL
192026	2005 YM_{193}	—	December 30, 2005	Kitt Peak	Spacewatch	·	2.2 km	MPC · JPL
192027	2005 YG_{201}	—	December 22, 2005	Kitt Peak	Spacewatch	·	3.0 km	MPC · JPL
192028	2005 YO_{211}	—	December 28, 2005	Catalina	CSS	EUN	2.1 km	MPC · JPL
192029	2005 YS_{211}	—	December 28, 2005	Catalina	CSS	·	2.2 km	MPC · JPL
192030	2005 YS_{224}	—	December 25, 2005	Kitt Peak	Spacewatch	·	3.0 km	MPC · JPL
192031	2005 YU_{225}	—	December 25, 2005	Kitt Peak	Spacewatch	·	2.6 km	MPC · JPL
192032	2005 YF_{247}	—	December 30, 2005	Mount Lemmon	Mount Lemmon Survey	·	3.9 km	MPC · JPL
192033	2005 YG_{247}	—	December 30, 2005	Mount Lemmon	Mount Lemmon Survey	·	1.8 km	MPC · JPL
192034	2005 YL_{269}	—	December 25, 2005	Mount Lemmon	Mount Lemmon Survey	MAR	1.4 km	MPC · JPL
192035	2005 YV_{273}	—	December 30, 2005	Mount Lemmon	Mount Lemmon Survey	·	1.7 km	MPC · JPL
192036	2005 YW_{273}	—	December 30, 2005	Mount Lemmon	Mount Lemmon Survey	·	3.4 km	MPC · JPL
192037	2005 YU_{274}	—	December 25, 2005	Catalina	CSS	·	2.5 km	MPC · JPL
192038	2005 YE_{275}	—	December 25, 2005	Mount Lemmon	Mount Lemmon Survey	·	4.3 km	MPC · JPL
192039	2005 YM_{286}	—	December 30, 2005	Kitt Peak	Spacewatch	·	3.4 km	MPC · JPL
192040	2005 YF_{287}	—	December 25, 2005	Catalina	CSS	·	2.2 km	MPC · JPL
192041	2005 YG_{287}	—	December 29, 2005	Socorro	LINEAR	·	3.3 km	MPC · JPL
192042	2006 AP_{4}	—	January 4, 2006	Kitt Peak	Spacewatch	·	1.7 km	MPC · JPL
192043	2006 AK_{14}	—	January 5, 2006	Mount Lemmon	Mount Lemmon Survey	MAS · fast	1.0 km	MPC · JPL
192044	2006 AH_{32}	—	January 5, 2006	Catalina	CSS	·	5.0 km	MPC · JPL
192045	2006 AX_{45}	—	January 5, 2006	Kitt Peak	Spacewatch	·	4.1 km	MPC · JPL
192046	2006 AE_{73}	—	January 7, 2006	Anderson Mesa	LONEOS	·	2.4 km	MPC · JPL
192047	2006 AX_{78}	—	January 5, 2006	Kitt Peak	Spacewatch	·	3.6 km	MPC · JPL
192048	2006 AY_{85}	—	January 11, 2006	Anderson Mesa	LONEOS	·	6.3 km	MPC · JPL
192049	2006 AU_{92}	—	January 7, 2006	Mount Lemmon	Mount Lemmon Survey	·	1.9 km	MPC · JPL
192050	2006 AJ_{93}	—	January 7, 2006	Kitt Peak	Spacewatch	·	2.7 km	MPC · JPL
192051	2006 AT_{95}	—	January 9, 2006	Kitt Peak	Spacewatch	·	3.2 km	MPC · JPL
192052	2006 AU_{96}	—	January 10, 2006	Catalina	CSS	PHO	1.6 km	MPC · JPL
192053	2006 AV_{96}	—	January 10, 2006	Catalina	CSS	·	2.6 km	MPC · JPL
192054	2006 BO_{12}	—	January 21, 2006	Kitt Peak	Spacewatch	KOR	1.9 km	MPC · JPL
192055	2006 BA_{36}	—	January 23, 2006	Kitt Peak	Spacewatch	·	3.2 km	MPC · JPL
192056	2006 BR_{40}	—	January 21, 2006	Kitt Peak	Spacewatch	·	2.7 km	MPC · JPL
192057	2006 BC_{41}	—	January 22, 2006	Anderson Mesa	LONEOS	·	3.5 km	MPC · JPL
192058	2006 BT_{43}	—	January 23, 2006	Kitt Peak	Spacewatch	KOR	1.8 km	MPC · JPL
192059	2006 BA_{45}	—	January 23, 2006	Mount Lemmon	Mount Lemmon Survey	·	2.3 km	MPC · JPL
192060	2006 BW_{58}	—	January 23, 2006	Kitt Peak	Spacewatch	AGN	1.8 km	MPC · JPL
192061	2006 BE_{60}	—	January 26, 2006	Kitt Peak	Spacewatch	·	3.2 km	MPC · JPL
192062	2006 BY_{79}	—	January 23, 2006	Kitt Peak	Spacewatch	·	3.7 km	MPC · JPL
192063	2006 BF_{83}	—	January 24, 2006	Socorro	LINEAR	·	6.2 km	MPC · JPL
192064	2006 BX_{83}	—	January 25, 2006	Kitt Peak	Spacewatch	·	2.1 km	MPC · JPL
192065	2006 BY_{83}	—	January 25, 2006	Kitt Peak	Spacewatch	MAS	1.1 km	MPC · JPL
192066	2006 BF_{90}	—	January 25, 2006	Kitt Peak	Spacewatch	EOS	2.9 km	MPC · JPL
192067	2006 BT_{90}	—	January 25, 2006	Kitt Peak	Spacewatch	KOR	2.1 km	MPC · JPL
192068	2006 BA_{93}	—	January 26, 2006	Kitt Peak	Spacewatch	KOR	1.7 km	MPC · JPL
192069	2006 BU_{93}	—	January 26, 2006	Kitt Peak	Spacewatch	WIT	2.0 km	MPC · JPL
192070	2006 BH_{96}	—	January 26, 2006	Kitt Peak	Spacewatch	KOR	2.1 km	MPC · JPL
192071	2006 BW_{96}	—	January 26, 2006	Mount Lemmon	Mount Lemmon Survey	KOR	2.1 km	MPC · JPL
192072	2006 BG_{98}	—	January 27, 2006	Kitt Peak	Spacewatch	·	4.1 km	MPC · JPL
192073	2006 BW_{98}	—	January 25, 2006	Kitt Peak	Spacewatch	·	2.6 km	MPC · JPL
192074	2006 BY_{98}	—	January 25, 2006	Kitt Peak	Spacewatch	AST	3.4 km	MPC · JPL
192075	2006 BW_{101}	—	January 23, 2006	Mount Lemmon	Mount Lemmon Survey	·	2.8 km	MPC · JPL
192076	2006 BO_{103}	—	January 23, 2006	Mount Lemmon	Mount Lemmon Survey	·	2.4 km	MPC · JPL
192077	2006 BK_{116}	—	January 26, 2006	Kitt Peak	Spacewatch	·	2.8 km	MPC · JPL
192078	2006 BU_{123}	—	January 26, 2006	Kitt Peak	Spacewatch	THM	3.7 km	MPC · JPL
192079	2006 BC_{126}	—	January 26, 2006	Kitt Peak	Spacewatch	·	4.4 km	MPC · JPL
192080	2006 BF_{139}	—	January 28, 2006	Mount Lemmon	Mount Lemmon Survey	·	2.0 km	MPC · JPL
192081	2006 BW_{142}	—	January 26, 2006	Kitt Peak	Spacewatch	·	4.9 km	MPC · JPL
192082	2006 BX_{145}	—	January 30, 2006	7300 Observatory	W. K. Y. Yeung	·	3.6 km	MPC · JPL
192083	2006 BS_{155}	—	January 25, 2006	Kitt Peak	Spacewatch	HOF	4.6 km	MPC · JPL
192084	2006 BV_{155}	—	January 25, 2006	Kitt Peak	Spacewatch	·	7.0 km	MPC · JPL
192085	2006 BY_{163}	—	January 26, 2006	Mount Lemmon	Mount Lemmon Survey	WIT	1.6 km	MPC · JPL
192086	2006 BL_{166}	—	January 26, 2006	Mount Lemmon	Mount Lemmon Survey	WIT	1.8 km	MPC · JPL
192087	2006 BM_{167}	—	January 26, 2006	Mount Lemmon	Mount Lemmon Survey	·	4.1 km	MPC · JPL
192088	2006 BG_{169}	—	January 26, 2006	Mount Lemmon	Mount Lemmon Survey	·	3.0 km	MPC · JPL
192089	2006 BM_{183}	—	January 27, 2006	Anderson Mesa	LONEOS	·	3.7 km	MPC · JPL
192090	2006 BQ_{192}	—	January 30, 2006	Kitt Peak	Spacewatch	(5)	4.2 km	MPC · JPL
192091	2006 BQ_{196}	—	January 30, 2006	Kitt Peak	Spacewatch	·	3.2 km	MPC · JPL
192092	2006 BD_{200}	—	January 30, 2006	Kitt Peak	Spacewatch	THM	3.4 km	MPC · JPL
192093	2006 BG_{200}	—	January 31, 2006	Kitt Peak	Spacewatch	MAS	1.1 km	MPC · JPL
192094	2006 BH_{203}	—	January 31, 2006	Kitt Peak	Spacewatch	KOR	2.1 km	MPC · JPL
192095	2006 BJ_{207}	—	January 31, 2006	Mount Lemmon	Mount Lemmon Survey	AGN	1.9 km	MPC · JPL
192096	2006 BX_{207}	—	January 31, 2006	Catalina	CSS	·	2.6 km	MPC · JPL
192097	2006 BF_{210}	—	January 31, 2006	Catalina	CSS	EUP	5.5 km	MPC · JPL
192098	2006 BT_{252}	—	January 31, 2006	Kitt Peak	Spacewatch	KOR	1.9 km	MPC · JPL
192099	2006 BS_{253}	—	January 31, 2006	Kitt Peak	Spacewatch	KOR	1.9 km	MPC · JPL
192100	2006 BA_{269}	—	January 27, 2006	Catalina	CSS	·	3.6 km	MPC · JPL

== 192101–192200 ==
back to top

Designation			Discovery			Properties		Ref
Permanent	Provisional	Named after	Date	Site	Discoverer(s)	Category	Diam.	Ref
192101	2006 BO_{270}	—	January 31, 2006	Catalina	CSS	·	2.9 km	MPC · JPL
192102	2006 BY_{278}	—	January 26, 2006	Kitt Peak	Spacewatch	KOR	2.1 km	MPC · JPL
192103	2006 CL_{11}	—	February 1, 2006	Kitt Peak	Spacewatch	·	5.4 km	MPC · JPL
192104	2006 CK_{12}	—	February 1, 2006	Kitt Peak	Spacewatch	·	3.4 km	MPC · JPL
192105	2006 CL_{18}	—	February 1, 2006	Kitt Peak	Spacewatch	AGN	1.8 km	MPC · JPL
192106	2006 CE_{23}	—	February 1, 2006	Kitt Peak	Spacewatch	·	4.9 km	MPC · JPL
192107	2006 CD_{26}	—	February 2, 2006	Kitt Peak	Spacewatch	AGN	2.3 km	MPC · JPL
192108	2006 CO_{29}	—	February 2, 2006	Kitt Peak	Spacewatch	·	2.4 km	MPC · JPL
192109	2006 CK_{39}	—	February 2, 2006	Kitt Peak	Spacewatch	·	6.2 km	MPC · JPL
192110	2006 CR_{43}	—	February 2, 2006	Mount Lemmon	Mount Lemmon Survey	·	4.0 km	MPC · JPL
192111	2006 CT_{44}	—	February 3, 2006	Kitt Peak	Spacewatch	·	2.1 km	MPC · JPL
192112	2006 CX_{56}	—	February 4, 2006	Kitt Peak	Spacewatch	·	3.0 km	MPC · JPL
192113	2006 CB_{57}	—	February 4, 2006	Mount Lemmon	Mount Lemmon Survey	·	2.9 km	MPC · JPL
192114	2006 CR_{66}	—	February 2, 2006	Kitt Peak	Spacewatch	·	3.1 km	MPC · JPL
192115	2006 DG_{2}	—	February 20, 2006	Kitt Peak	Spacewatch	·	2.4 km	MPC · JPL
192116	2006 DM_{9}	—	February 21, 2006	Catalina	CSS	·	4.5 km	MPC · JPL
192117	2006 DF_{27}	—	February 20, 2006	Kitt Peak	Spacewatch	·	2.6 km	MPC · JPL
192118	2006 DN_{30}	—	February 20, 2006	Kitt Peak	Spacewatch	·	3.9 km	MPC · JPL
192119	2006 DG_{32}	—	February 20, 2006	Mount Lemmon	Mount Lemmon Survey	·	3.2 km	MPC · JPL
192120	2006 DB_{44}	—	February 20, 2006	Kitt Peak	Spacewatch	·	2.3 km	MPC · JPL
192121	2006 DG_{45}	—	February 20, 2006	Kitt Peak	Spacewatch	·	3.8 km	MPC · JPL
192122	2006 DB_{53}	—	February 24, 2006	Kitt Peak	Spacewatch	EOS	2.6 km	MPC · JPL
192123	2006 DJ_{59}	—	February 24, 2006	Mount Lemmon	Mount Lemmon Survey	·	3.0 km	MPC · JPL
192124	2006 DO_{59}	—	February 24, 2006	Mount Lemmon	Mount Lemmon Survey	KOR	1.9 km	MPC · JPL
192125	2006 DB_{69}	—	February 20, 2006	Catalina	CSS	·	3.6 km	MPC · JPL
192126	2006 DF_{74}	—	February 23, 2006	Anderson Mesa	LONEOS	EOS	3.6 km	MPC · JPL
192127	2006 DY_{77}	—	February 24, 2006	Kitt Peak	Spacewatch	·	2.5 km	MPC · JPL
192128	2006 DV_{94}	—	February 24, 2006	Kitt Peak	Spacewatch	·	1.8 km	MPC · JPL
192129	2006 DN_{98}	—	February 25, 2006	Kitt Peak	Spacewatch	·	3.7 km	MPC · JPL
192130	2006 DZ_{101}	—	February 25, 2006	Kitt Peak	Spacewatch	·	2.7 km	MPC · JPL
192131	2006 DD_{116}	—	February 27, 2006	Kitt Peak	Spacewatch	·	3.0 km	MPC · JPL
192132	2006 DK_{120}	—	February 21, 2006	Catalina	CSS	·	4.5 km	MPC · JPL
192133	2006 DZ_{120}	—	February 22, 2006	Catalina	CSS	·	4.2 km	MPC · JPL
192134	2006 DJ_{124}	—	February 24, 2006	Mount Lemmon	Mount Lemmon Survey	·	1.7 km	MPC · JPL
192135	2006 DF_{159}	—	February 27, 2006	Kitt Peak	Spacewatch	·	3.0 km	MPC · JPL
192136	2006 DS_{160}	—	February 27, 2006	Kitt Peak	Spacewatch	·	4.6 km	MPC · JPL
192137	2006 DZ_{187}	—	February 27, 2006	Kitt Peak	Spacewatch	·	5.1 km	MPC · JPL
192138	2006 DX_{195}	—	February 20, 2006	Kitt Peak	Spacewatch	·	3.3 km	MPC · JPL
192139	2006 DC_{198}	—	February 25, 2006	Anderson Mesa	LONEOS	EOS	5.3 km	MPC · JPL
192140	2006 EV_{26}	—	March 3, 2006	Kitt Peak	Spacewatch	·	6.0 km	MPC · JPL
192141	2006 EB_{41}	—	March 4, 2006	Kitt Peak	Spacewatch	·	4.5 km	MPC · JPL
192142	2006 FB_{2}	—	March 23, 2006	Catalina	CSS	·	7.4 km	MPC · JPL
192143	2006 FC_{8}	—	March 23, 2006	Mount Lemmon	Mount Lemmon Survey	·	2.6 km	MPC · JPL
192144	2006 FR_{9}	—	March 24, 2006	RAS	Lowe, A.	·	6.9 km	MPC · JPL
192145	2006 FG_{21}	—	March 24, 2006	Mount Lemmon	Mount Lemmon Survey	AGN	2.1 km	MPC · JPL
192146	2006 FP_{22}	—	March 24, 2006	Mount Lemmon	Mount Lemmon Survey	·	5.8 km	MPC · JPL
192147	2006 FS_{40}	—	March 26, 2006	Kitt Peak	Spacewatch	KOR	2.2 km	MPC · JPL
192148	2006 FK_{43}	—	March 29, 2006	Socorro	LINEAR	·	4.7 km	MPC · JPL
192149	2006 FV_{47}	—	March 24, 2006	Anderson Mesa	LONEOS	·	5.2 km	MPC · JPL
192150	2006 GC_{40}	—	April 6, 2006	Socorro	LINEAR	·	6.2 km	MPC · JPL
192151	2006 HD_{5}	—	April 19, 2006	Catalina	CSS	·	8.6 km	MPC · JPL
192152	2006 HC_{7}	—	April 19, 2006	Palomar	NEAT	·	5.0 km	MPC · JPL
192153	2006 HH_{8}	—	April 19, 2006	Kitt Peak	Spacewatch	·	3.3 km	MPC · JPL
192154	2006 HN_{9}	—	April 19, 2006	Anderson Mesa	LONEOS	·	8.4 km	MPC · JPL
192155 Hargittai	2006 HZ_{17}	Hargittai	April 21, 2006	Piszkéstető	K. Sárneczky	·	2.5 km	MPC · JPL
192156	2006 HP_{42}	—	April 23, 2006	Socorro	LINEAR	·	6.7 km	MPC · JPL
192157	2006 VZ_{113}	—	November 13, 2006	San Marcello	San Marcello	·	2.0 km	MPC · JPL
192158 Christian	2006 XF_{4}	Christian	December 14, 2006	Wildberg	R. Apitzsch	H	650 m	MPC · JPL
192159	2007 BP_{16}	—	January 17, 2007	Catalina	CSS	H	1.2 km	MPC · JPL
192160	2007 BX_{28}	—	January 24, 2007	Nyukasa	Japan Aerospace Exploration Agency	HOF	3.6 km	MPC · JPL
192161	2007 CY_{3}	—	February 6, 2007	Mount Lemmon	Mount Lemmon Survey	·	1.5 km	MPC · JPL
192162	2007 CN_{41}	—	February 7, 2007	Kitt Peak	Spacewatch	·	2.6 km	MPC · JPL
192163	2007 CM_{42}	—	February 7, 2007	Mount Lemmon	Mount Lemmon Survey	NYS	1.8 km	MPC · JPL
192164	2007 DB_{11}	—	February 17, 2007	Kitt Peak	Spacewatch	·	1.7 km	MPC · JPL
192165	2007 DG_{13}	—	February 16, 2007	Palomar	NEAT	·	1.6 km	MPC · JPL
192166	2007 DJ_{18}	—	February 17, 2007	Kitt Peak	Spacewatch	·	1.5 km	MPC · JPL
192167	2007 DQ_{18}	—	February 17, 2007	Kitt Peak	Spacewatch	·	2.0 km	MPC · JPL
192168	2007 DT_{53}	—	February 19, 2007	Mount Lemmon	Mount Lemmon Survey	·	860 m	MPC · JPL
192169	2007 DR_{75}	—	February 21, 2007	Kitt Peak	Spacewatch	·	2.0 km	MPC · JPL
192170	2007 DV_{82}	—	February 23, 2007	Kitt Peak	Spacewatch	·	1.8 km	MPC · JPL
192171	2007 DC_{83}	—	February 24, 2007	Socorro	LINEAR	·	2.4 km	MPC · JPL
192172	2007 DO_{105}	—	February 17, 2007	Kitt Peak	Spacewatch	·	1.2 km	MPC · JPL
192173	2007 EF_{42}	—	March 9, 2007	Kitt Peak	Spacewatch	·	1.8 km	MPC · JPL
192174	2007 EG_{51}	—	March 10, 2007	Palomar	NEAT	·	2.0 km	MPC · JPL
192175	2007 EL_{72}	—	March 10, 2007	Kitt Peak	Spacewatch	·	1.1 km	MPC · JPL
192176	2007 ER_{149}	—	March 12, 2007	Mount Lemmon	Mount Lemmon Survey	·	1.9 km	MPC · JPL
192177	2007 EB_{182}	—	March 14, 2007	Kitt Peak	Spacewatch	·	2.0 km	MPC · JPL
192178 Lijieshou	2007 EA_{200}	Lijieshou	March 10, 2007	XuYi	PMO NEO Survey Program	·	1.7 km	MPC · JPL
192179	2007 EQ_{210}	—	March 8, 2007	Palomar	NEAT	·	2.8 km	MPC · JPL
192180	2007 ED_{213}	—	March 14, 2007	Siding Spring	SSS	·	2.4 km	MPC · JPL
192181	2007 EC_{214}	—	March 12, 2007	Kitt Peak	Spacewatch	·	3.6 km	MPC · JPL
192182 Ennedi	2007 EP_{217}	Ennedi	March 11, 2007	Mount Lemmon	Mount Lemmon Survey	·	3.4 km	MPC · JPL
192183	2007 FG_{12}	—	March 17, 2007	Anderson Mesa	LONEOS	·	2.5 km	MPC · JPL
192184	2007 FW_{35}	—	March 25, 2007	Catalina	CSS	·	3.0 km	MPC · JPL
192185	2007 FS_{43}	—	March 18, 2007	Kitt Peak	Spacewatch	·	1.2 km	MPC · JPL
192186	2007 GA_{5}	—	April 12, 2007	Altschwendt	W. Ries	·	3.1 km	MPC · JPL
192187	2007 GF_{9}	—	April 8, 2007	Kitt Peak	Spacewatch	·	1.3 km	MPC · JPL
192188	2007 GR_{9}	—	April 8, 2007	Siding Spring	SSS	·	1.4 km	MPC · JPL
192189	2007 GT_{23}	—	April 11, 2007	Kitt Peak	Spacewatch	THM	3.0 km	MPC · JPL
192190	2007 GG_{33}	—	April 11, 2007	Catalina	CSS	·	5.5 km	MPC · JPL
192191	2007 GH_{39}	—	April 14, 2007	Kitt Peak	Spacewatch	THM	3.7 km	MPC · JPL
192192	2007 GX_{45}	—	April 14, 2007	Kitt Peak	Spacewatch	·	2.6 km	MPC · JPL
192193	2007 GP_{48}	—	April 14, 2007	Kitt Peak	Spacewatch	·	3.3 km	MPC · JPL
192194	2007 GW_{53}	—	April 14, 2007	Kitt Peak	Spacewatch	·	2.3 km	MPC · JPL
192195	2007 GM_{71}	—	April 14, 2007	Catalina	CSS	V	990 m	MPC · JPL
192196	2007 HU_{2}	—	April 16, 2007	Mount Lemmon	Mount Lemmon Survey	·	1.5 km	MPC · JPL
192197	2007 HR_{4}	—	April 19, 2007	Great Shefford	Birtwhistle, P.	MRX	1.7 km	MPC · JPL
192198	2007 HJ_{12}	—	April 19, 2007	Mount Lemmon	Mount Lemmon Survey	·	2.1 km	MPC · JPL
192199	2007 HE_{25}	—	April 18, 2007	Kitt Peak	Spacewatch	·	2.2 km	MPC · JPL
192200	2007 HN_{52}	—	April 20, 2007	Kitt Peak	Spacewatch	·	4.8 km	MPC · JPL

== 192201–192300 ==
back to top

Designation			Discovery			Properties		Ref
Permanent	Provisional	Named after	Date	Site	Discoverer(s)	Category	Diam.	Ref
192201	2007 HA_{61}	—	April 20, 2007	Kitt Peak	Spacewatch	·	1.5 km	MPC · JPL
192202	2007 HP_{70}	—	April 19, 2007	Kitt Peak	Spacewatch	·	2.7 km	MPC · JPL
192203	2007 HH_{90}	—	April 22, 2007	Siding Spring	SSS	HIL · 3:2	9.4 km	MPC · JPL
192204	2007 JN_{21}	—	May 12, 2007	Tiki	S. F. Hönig, Teamo, N.	·	3.0 km	MPC · JPL
192205	2007 JJ_{27}	—	May 9, 2007	Kitt Peak	Spacewatch	HYG	4.8 km	MPC · JPL
192206	2007 JR_{28}	—	May 10, 2007	Mount Lemmon	Mount Lemmon Survey	·	2.7 km	MPC · JPL
192207	2007 JB_{33}	—	May 12, 2007	Mount Lemmon	Mount Lemmon Survey	WIT	1.4 km	MPC · JPL
192208 Tzu Chi	2007 JX_{33}	Tzu Chi	May 11, 2007	Lulin Observatory	Shih, C.-Y., Q. Ye	·	6.8 km	MPC · JPL
192209	2007 JL_{38}	—	May 12, 2007	Mount Lemmon	Mount Lemmon Survey	·	2.3 km	MPC · JPL
192210	2007 JY_{41}	—	May 15, 2007	Mount Lemmon	Mount Lemmon Survey	·	4.5 km	MPC · JPL
192211	2007 KO_{3}	—	May 17, 2007	Catalina	CSS	EOS	4.2 km	MPC · JPL
192212	2007 LM_{1}	—	June 5, 2007	Catalina	CSS	·	2.7 km	MPC · JPL
192213	2007 LE_{28}	—	June 15, 2007	Kitt Peak	Spacewatch	VER	4.4 km	MPC · JPL
192214	2007 LA_{34}	—	June 5, 2007	Catalina	CSS	EOS	4.4 km	MPC · JPL
192215	2007 MH_{19}	—	June 21, 2007	Mount Lemmon	Mount Lemmon Survey	L4	10 km	MPC · JPL
192216	2007 ML_{20}	—	June 23, 2007	Kitt Peak	Spacewatch	·	5.1 km	MPC · JPL
192217	2007 PT_{9}	—	August 9, 2007	Chante-Perdrix	Chante-Perdrix	L4	14 km	MPC · JPL
192218	2007 PX_{45}	—	August 10, 2007	Kitt Peak	Spacewatch	L4	10 km	MPC · JPL
192219	2007 RO_{23}	—	September 3, 2007	Catalina	CSS	·	6.6 km	MPC · JPL
192220 Oicles	2007 RZ_{132}	Oicles	September 14, 2007	Taunus	E. Schwab, R. Kling	L4	10 km	MPC · JPL
192221	2007 RQ_{278}	—	September 5, 2007	Siding Spring	SSS	L4	21 km	MPC · JPL
192222	2007 RZ_{281}	—	September 15, 2007	Catalina	CSS	L4	19 km	MPC · JPL
192223	2007 VM_{6}	—	November 3, 2007	Mount Lemmon	Mount Lemmon Survey	L4	10 km	MPC · JPL
192224	2007 VO_{6}	—	November 4, 2007	Mount Lemmon	Mount Lemmon Survey	L4	11 km	MPC · JPL
192225	2007 WT_{20}	—	November 18, 2007	Mount Lemmon	Mount Lemmon Survey	·	3.6 km	MPC · JPL
192226	2008 AB_{112}	—	January 15, 2008	Kitt Peak	Spacewatch	·	2.5 km	MPC · JPL
192227	2008 AD_{118}	—	January 13, 2008	Catalina	CSS	·	6.3 km	MPC · JPL
192228	2008 BE_{33}	—	January 30, 2008	Kitt Peak	Spacewatch	KOR	1.8 km	MPC · JPL
192229	2008 CA_{12}	—	February 3, 2008	Kitt Peak	Spacewatch	EUN	1.4 km	MPC · JPL
192230	2008 CQ_{40}	—	February 2, 2008	Kitt Peak	Spacewatch	V	680 m	MPC · JPL
192231	2008 CK_{45}	—	February 2, 2008	Kitt Peak	Spacewatch	GEF	1.9 km	MPC · JPL
192232	2008 CN_{48}	—	February 3, 2008	Kitt Peak	Spacewatch	·	2.2 km	MPC · JPL
192233	2008 CV_{83}	—	February 7, 2008	Kitt Peak	Spacewatch	·	3.5 km	MPC · JPL
192234	2008 CS_{189}	—	February 13, 2008	Catalina	CSS	·	3.9 km	MPC · JPL
192235	2008 CE_{201}	—	February 13, 2008	Mount Lemmon	Mount Lemmon Survey	·	2.0 km	MPC · JPL
192236	2008 CO_{202}	—	February 8, 2008	Kitt Peak	Spacewatch	KOR	1.9 km	MPC · JPL
192237	2008 DS_{1}	—	February 24, 2008	Mount Lemmon	Mount Lemmon Survey	·	2.4 km	MPC · JPL
192238	2008 DP_{29}	—	February 26, 2008	Kitt Peak	Spacewatch	·	1.8 km	MPC · JPL
192239	2008 DG_{40}	—	February 27, 2008	Kitt Peak	Spacewatch	·	1.6 km	MPC · JPL
192240	2008 DL_{54}	—	February 27, 2008	Catalina	CSS	·	3.0 km	MPC · JPL
192241	2008 DA_{70}	—	February 26, 2008	Mount Lemmon	Mount Lemmon Survey	·	5.9 km	MPC · JPL
192242	2008 DF_{85}	—	February 28, 2008	Kitt Peak	Spacewatch	·	1.4 km	MPC · JPL
192243	2008 EY_{32}	—	March 1, 2008	Kitt Peak	Spacewatch	·	3.9 km	MPC · JPL
192244	2008 EP_{39}	—	March 4, 2008	Kitt Peak	Spacewatch	(13314)	2.8 km	MPC · JPL
192245	2008 EG_{50}	—	March 6, 2008	Mount Lemmon	Mount Lemmon Survey	AGN	1.3 km	MPC · JPL
192246	2008 EY_{57}	—	March 7, 2008	Mount Lemmon	Mount Lemmon Survey	·	1.9 km	MPC · JPL
192247	2008 EJ_{98}	—	March 2, 2008	Catalina	CSS	·	3.9 km	MPC · JPL
192248	2008 EK_{99}	—	March 4, 2008	Catalina	CSS	NAE	4.7 km	MPC · JPL
192249	2008 EC_{119}	—	March 9, 2008	Mount Lemmon	Mount Lemmon Survey	·	3.2 km	MPC · JPL
192250	2008 FS_{39}	—	March 28, 2008	Kitt Peak	Spacewatch	·	2.0 km	MPC · JPL
192251	2008 FF_{69}	—	March 28, 2008	Mount Lemmon	Mount Lemmon Survey	·	2.6 km	MPC · JPL
192252	2008 FC_{70}	—	March 28, 2008	Kitt Peak	Spacewatch	·	2.7 km	MPC · JPL
192253	2008 FK_{80}	—	March 27, 2008	Mount Lemmon	Mount Lemmon Survey	·	3.0 km	MPC · JPL
192254	2008 GB_{20}	—	April 3, 2008	Kitt Peak	Spacewatch	·	1.1 km	MPC · JPL
192255	2008 GM_{36}	—	April 3, 2008	Kitt Peak	Spacewatch	·	3.8 km	MPC · JPL
192256	2008 GS_{54}	—	April 5, 2008	Mount Lemmon	Mount Lemmon Survey	V	800 m	MPC · JPL
192257	2008 GD_{60}	—	April 5, 2008	Catalina	CSS	EOS	3.4 km	MPC · JPL
192258	2008 GB_{76}	—	April 7, 2008	Mount Lemmon	Mount Lemmon Survey	·	2.2 km	MPC · JPL
192259	2008 GR_{107}	—	April 12, 2008	Catalina	CSS	DOR	3.2 km	MPC · JPL
192260	2008 GQ_{134}	—	April 4, 2008	Catalina	CSS	·	2.8 km	MPC · JPL
192261	2008 HB_{6}	—	April 24, 2008	Kitt Peak	Spacewatch	·	2.8 km	MPC · JPL
192262	2008 HO_{8}	—	April 24, 2008	Kitt Peak	Spacewatch	L5	10 km	MPC · JPL
192263	2008 HZ_{16}	—	April 25, 2008	Catalina	CSS	·	2.7 km	MPC · JPL
192264	2008 HH_{38}	—	April 28, 2008	Socorro	LINEAR	·	1.0 km	MPC · JPL
192265	2008 KV_{15}	—	May 27, 2008	Kitt Peak	Spacewatch	PHO	1.2 km	MPC · JPL
192266	2008 KN_{31}	—	May 29, 2008	Kitt Peak	Spacewatch	·	1.1 km	MPC · JPL
192267	2008 KT_{33}	—	May 29, 2008	Mount Lemmon	Mount Lemmon Survey	EOS	2.4 km	MPC · JPL
192268	2008 LD_{12}	—	June 7, 2008	Kitt Peak	Spacewatch	L5	10 km	MPC · JPL
192269	2008 OB_{4}	—	July 26, 2008	Siding Spring	SSS	·	3.5 km	MPC · JPL
192270	7642 P-L	—	October 17, 1960	Palomar	C. J. van Houten, I. van Houten-Groeneveld, T. Gehrels	·	3.2 km	MPC · JPL
192271	3310 T-1	—	March 26, 1971	Palomar	C. J. van Houten, I. van Houten-Groeneveld, T. Gehrels	PHO	2.8 km	MPC · JPL
192272	1132 T-2	—	September 29, 1973	Palomar	C. J. van Houten, I. van Houten-Groeneveld, T. Gehrels	·	2.5 km	MPC · JPL
192273	2299 T-2	—	September 29, 1973	Palomar	C. J. van Houten, I. van Houten-Groeneveld, T. Gehrels	NYS	1.7 km	MPC · JPL
192274	1169 T-3	—	October 17, 1977	Palomar	C. J. van Houten, I. van Houten-Groeneveld, T. Gehrels	·	1.5 km	MPC · JPL
192275	2227 T-3	—	October 16, 1977	Palomar	C. J. van Houten, I. van Houten-Groeneveld, T. Gehrels	·	3.9 km	MPC · JPL
192276	2498 T-3	—	October 16, 1977	Palomar	C. J. van Houten, I. van Houten-Groeneveld, T. Gehrels	·	3.3 km	MPC · JPL
192277	3126 T-3	—	October 16, 1977	Palomar	C. J. van Houten, I. van Houten-Groeneveld, T. Gehrels	MRX	1.9 km	MPC · JPL
192278	3148 T-3	—	October 16, 1977	Palomar	C. J. van Houten, I. van Houten-Groeneveld, T. Gehrels	·	1.4 km	MPC · JPL
192279	3153 T-3	—	October 16, 1977	Palomar	C. J. van Houten, I. van Houten-Groeneveld, T. Gehrels	·	1.0 km	MPC · JPL
192280	3534 T-3	—	October 16, 1977	Palomar	C. J. van Houten, I. van Houten-Groeneveld, T. Gehrels	·	1.8 km	MPC · JPL
192281	1978 UC_{7}	—	October 27, 1978	Palomar	C. M. Olmstead	·	4.4 km	MPC · JPL
192282	1979 MY_{4}	—	June 25, 1979	Siding Spring	E. F. Helin, S. J. Bus	·	1.5 km	MPC · JPL
192283	1981 EE_{3}	—	March 2, 1981	Siding Spring	S. J. Bus	·	4.0 km	MPC · JPL
192284	1981 EL_{11}	—	March 7, 1981	Siding Spring	S. J. Bus	·	1.2 km	MPC · JPL
192285	1981 EU_{12}	—	March 1, 1981	Siding Spring	S. J. Bus	·	2.8 km	MPC · JPL
192286	1981 ES_{15}	—	March 1, 1981	Siding Spring	S. J. Bus	·	2.9 km	MPC · JPL
192287	1981 EL_{22}	—	March 2, 1981	Siding Spring	S. J. Bus	ERI	2.4 km	MPC · JPL
192288	1981 EF_{34}	—	March 1, 1981	Siding Spring	S. J. Bus	·	3.4 km	MPC · JPL
192289	1981 EQ_{45}	—	March 1, 1981	Siding Spring	S. J. Bus	·	1.8 km	MPC · JPL
192290	1989 QT	—	August 26, 1989	Siding Spring	R. H. McNaught	WAT	3.9 km	MPC · JPL
192291 Palindrome	1990 QX_{19}	Palindrome	August 17, 1990	Palomar	Lowe, A.	·	3.3 km	MPC · JPL
192292	1990 RC_{7}	—	September 13, 1990	La Silla	H. Debehogne	NYS	1.7 km	MPC · JPL
192293 Dominikbrunner	1990 TA_{2}	Dominikbrunner	October 10, 1990	Tautenburg Observatory	F. Börngen, L. D. Schmadel	MRX	1.6 km	MPC · JPL
192294	1991 TE_{15}	—	October 6, 1991	Palomar	Lowe, A.	·	1.0 km	MPC · JPL
192295	1991 TN_{15}	—	October 6, 1991	Palomar	Lowe, A.	·	920 m	MPC · JPL
192296	1991 TA_{16}	—	October 6, 1991	Palomar	Lowe, A.	NYS	1.3 km	MPC · JPL
192297	1992 DX_{9}	—	February 29, 1992	La Silla	UESAC	fast	1.4 km	MPC · JPL
192298	1992 ES_{2}	—	March 6, 1992	Kitt Peak	Spacewatch	·	1.8 km	MPC · JPL
192299	1992 EW_{4}	—	March 1, 1992	La Silla	UESAC	·	1.8 km	MPC · JPL
192300	1992 SY_{9}	—	September 27, 1992	Kitt Peak	Spacewatch	·	1.5 km	MPC · JPL

== 192301–192400 ==
back to top

Designation			Discovery			Properties		Ref
Permanent	Provisional	Named after	Date	Site	Discoverer(s)	Category	Diam.	Ref
192301	1992 SQ_{10}	—	September 27, 1992	Kitt Peak	Spacewatch	·	680 m	MPC · JPL
192302	1993 BL_{8}	—	January 21, 1993	Kitt Peak	Spacewatch	·	1.0 km	MPC · JPL
192303	1993 FJ_{7}	—	March 17, 1993	La Silla	UESAC	·	1.1 km	MPC · JPL
192304	1993 FK_{40}	—	March 19, 1993	La Silla	UESAC	·	4.4 km	MPC · JPL
192305	1993 FE_{45}	—	March 19, 1993	La Silla	UESAC	·	2.0 km	MPC · JPL
192306	1993 FB_{80}	—	March 17, 1993	La Silla	UESAC	·	2.5 km	MPC · JPL
192307	1993 RM_{16}	—	September 15, 1993	La Silla	H. Debehogne, E. W. Elst	·	2.8 km	MPC · JPL
192308	1993 TK_{7}	—	October 9, 1993	Kitt Peak	Spacewatch	·	1.6 km	MPC · JPL
192309	1993 TK_{26}	—	October 9, 1993	La Silla	E. W. Elst	slow	3.1 km	MPC · JPL
192310	1993 TN_{26}	—	October 9, 1993	La Silla	E. W. Elst	·	2.3 km	MPC · JPL
192311	1993 TS_{29}	—	October 9, 1993	La Silla	E. W. Elst	·	1.6 km	MPC · JPL
192312	1994 AT_{9}	—	January 8, 1994	Kitt Peak	Spacewatch	MAS	1.1 km	MPC · JPL
192313	1994 AV_{13}	—	January 12, 1994	Kitt Peak	Spacewatch	NYS	2.0 km	MPC · JPL
192314	1994 CN_{1}	—	February 9, 1994	Farra d'Isonzo	Farra d'Isonzo	·	1.7 km	MPC · JPL
192315	1994 JO_{4}	—	May 3, 1994	Kitt Peak	Spacewatch	·	1.5 km	MPC · JPL
192316	1994 JH_{6}	—	May 4, 1994	Kitt Peak	Spacewatch	·	2.8 km	MPC · JPL
192317	1994 PO_{26}	—	August 12, 1994	La Silla	E. W. Elst	·	1.2 km	MPC · JPL
192318	1994 RH_{16}	—	September 3, 1994	La Silla	E. W. Elst	·	4.3 km	MPC · JPL
192319	1994 RY_{24}	—	September 5, 1994	La Silla	E. W. Elst	·	3.0 km	MPC · JPL
192320	1994 RA_{28}	—	September 5, 1994	La Silla	E. W. Elst	·	3.7 km	MPC · JPL
192321	1994 SE_{11}	—	September 29, 1994	Kitt Peak	Spacewatch	AST	3.1 km	MPC · JPL
192322	1994 SN_{11}	—	September 29, 1994	Kitt Peak	Spacewatch	NEM	2.4 km	MPC · JPL
192323	1994 SD_{12}	—	September 29, 1994	Kitt Peak	Spacewatch	·	850 m	MPC · JPL
192324	1994 TD_{7}	—	October 4, 1994	Kitt Peak	Spacewatch	·	990 m	MPC · JPL
192325	1994 UL_{8}	—	October 28, 1994	Kitt Peak	Spacewatch	·	1.4 km	MPC · JPL
192326	1994 UT_{8}	—	October 28, 1994	Kitt Peak	Spacewatch	AGN	2.1 km	MPC · JPL
192327	1994 VS_{3}	—	November 1, 1994	Kitt Peak	Spacewatch	·	3.3 km	MPC · JPL
192328	1994 WW_{5}	—	November 28, 1994	Kitt Peak	Spacewatch	·	2.5 km	MPC · JPL
192329	1995 BE_{14}	—	January 31, 1995	Kitt Peak	Spacewatch	·	1.3 km	MPC · JPL
192330	1995 BN_{15}	—	January 31, 1995	Kitt Peak	Spacewatch	NYS	1.7 km	MPC · JPL
192331	1995 CB_{6}	—	February 1, 1995	Kitt Peak	Spacewatch	·	1.1 km	MPC · JPL
192332	1995 FA	—	March 21, 1995	Stroncone	Santa Lucia	·	1.9 km	MPC · JPL
192333	1995 FG_{5}	—	March 23, 1995	Kitt Peak	Spacewatch	PHO	1.6 km	MPC · JPL
192334	1995 GU_{6}	—	April 6, 1995	Kitt Peak	Spacewatch	HYG	3.2 km	MPC · JPL
192335	1995 HD_{4}	—	April 26, 1995	Kitt Peak	Spacewatch	·	2.2 km	MPC · JPL
192336	1995 KK_{3}	—	May 25, 1995	Kitt Peak	Spacewatch	·	5.8 km	MPC · JPL
192337	1995 ME_{2}	—	June 23, 1995	Kitt Peak	Spacewatch	·	1.7 km	MPC · JPL
192338	1995 MM_{5}	—	June 23, 1995	Kitt Peak	Spacewatch	·	4.1 km	MPC · JPL
192339	1995 OD_{4}	—	July 22, 1995	Kitt Peak	Spacewatch	·	1.9 km	MPC · JPL
192340	1995 OE_{14}	—	July 23, 1995	Kitt Peak	Spacewatch	·	1.8 km	MPC · JPL
192341	1995 QF_{6}	—	August 22, 1995	Kitt Peak	Spacewatch	·	3.5 km	MPC · JPL
192342	1995 SP_{14}	—	September 18, 1995	Kitt Peak	Spacewatch	·	2.4 km	MPC · JPL
192343	1995 SU_{14}	—	September 18, 1995	Kitt Peak	Spacewatch	L4	12 km	MPC · JPL
192344	1995 SY_{15}	—	September 18, 1995	Kitt Peak	Spacewatch	·	2.2 km	MPC · JPL
192345	1995 SG_{24}	—	September 19, 1995	Kitt Peak	Spacewatch	L4	10 km	MPC · JPL
192346	1995 ST_{31}	—	September 21, 1995	Kitt Peak	Spacewatch	·	1.7 km	MPC · JPL
192347	1995 SK_{32}	—	September 21, 1995	Kitt Peak	Spacewatch	MAR	1.9 km	MPC · JPL
192348	1995 SY_{37}	—	September 24, 1995	Kitt Peak	Spacewatch	·	1.5 km	MPC · JPL
192349	1995 SV_{44}	—	September 25, 1995	Kitt Peak	Spacewatch	·	2.8 km	MPC · JPL
192350	1995 SW_{49}	—	September 26, 1995	Kitt Peak	Spacewatch	·	3.6 km	MPC · JPL
192351	1995 SM_{51}	—	September 26, 1995	Kitt Peak	Spacewatch	·	2.1 km	MPC · JPL
192352	1995 SE_{86}	—	September 26, 1995	Kitt Peak	Spacewatch	JUN	1.9 km	MPC · JPL
192353 Wangdazhong	1995 TS_{1}	Wangdazhong	October 14, 1995	Xinglong	SCAP	·	2.9 km	MPC · JPL
192354	1995 TV_{2}	—	October 15, 1995	Kitt Peak	Spacewatch	·	2.6 km	MPC · JPL
192355	1995 TL_{3}	—	October 15, 1995	Kitt Peak	Spacewatch	·	3.2 km	MPC · JPL
192356	1995 UB_{12}	—	October 17, 1995	Kitt Peak	Spacewatch	·	1.8 km	MPC · JPL
192357	1995 UY_{16}	—	October 17, 1995	Kitt Peak	Spacewatch	·	3.4 km	MPC · JPL
192358	1995 VT_{4}	—	November 14, 1995	Kitt Peak	Spacewatch	·	1.0 km	MPC · JPL
192359	1995 VY_{7}	—	November 14, 1995	Kitt Peak	Spacewatch	·	2.3 km	MPC · JPL
192360	1995 VN_{11}	—	November 15, 1995	Kitt Peak	Spacewatch	·	3.2 km	MPC · JPL
192361	1995 VB_{17}	—	November 15, 1995	Kitt Peak	Spacewatch	·	1.8 km	MPC · JPL
192362	1995 VC_{18}	—	November 15, 1995	Kitt Peak	Spacewatch	NEM	3.1 km	MPC · JPL
192363	1995 WR_{9}	—	November 16, 1995	Kitt Peak	Spacewatch	·	2.6 km	MPC · JPL
192364	1995 WB_{16}	—	November 17, 1995	Kitt Peak	Spacewatch	·	1.1 km	MPC · JPL
192365	1995 WU_{25}	—	November 18, 1995	Kitt Peak	Spacewatch	·	2.9 km	MPC · JPL
192366	1995 XP_{3}	—	December 14, 1995	Kitt Peak	Spacewatch	·	3.7 km	MPC · JPL
192367	1995 YF_{25}	—	December 16, 1995	Kitt Peak	Spacewatch	ADE	3.4 km	MPC · JPL
192368	1996 AT_{5}	—	January 12, 1996	Kitt Peak	Spacewatch	(2076)	1.4 km	MPC · JPL
192369	1996 AC_{6}	—	January 12, 1996	Kitt Peak	Spacewatch	·	2.6 km	MPC · JPL
192370	1996 AG_{10}	—	January 13, 1996	Kitt Peak	Spacewatch	AGN	1.6 km	MPC · JPL
192371	1996 AD_{12}	—	January 14, 1996	Kitt Peak	Spacewatch	·	2.8 km	MPC · JPL
192372	1996 AB_{14}	—	January 15, 1996	Kitt Peak	Spacewatch	·	2.7 km	MPC · JPL
192373	1996 BL_{6}	—	January 18, 1996	Kitt Peak	Spacewatch	·	2.7 km	MPC · JPL
192374	1996 BP_{6}	—	January 19, 1996	Kitt Peak	Spacewatch	·	3.9 km	MPC · JPL
192375	1996 BR_{7}	—	January 19, 1996	Kitt Peak	Spacewatch	KOR	1.7 km	MPC · JPL
192376	1996 EH_{6}	—	March 11, 1996	Kitt Peak	Spacewatch	·	3.1 km	MPC · JPL
192377	1996 EL_{11}	—	March 12, 1996	Kitt Peak	Spacewatch	AGN	1.7 km	MPC · JPL
192378	1996 FZ_{10}	—	March 20, 1996	Kitt Peak	Spacewatch	·	3.0 km	MPC · JPL
192379	1996 GS_{6}	—	April 12, 1996	Kitt Peak	Spacewatch	·	2.9 km	MPC · JPL
192380	1996 GR_{11}	—	April 14, 1996	Kitt Peak	Spacewatch	NAE	5.3 km	MPC · JPL
192381	1996 HT_{4}	—	April 18, 1996	Kitt Peak	Spacewatch	V	960 m	MPC · JPL
192382	1996 JM_{8}	—	May 12, 1996	Kitt Peak	Spacewatch	NYS	1.4 km	MPC · JPL
192383	1996 JD_{10}	—	May 13, 1996	Kitt Peak	Spacewatch	·	1.1 km	MPC · JPL
192384	1996 KN_{2}	—	May 18, 1996	Kitt Peak	Spacewatch	V	990 m	MPC · JPL
192385	1996 RO_{12}	—	September 8, 1996	Kitt Peak	Spacewatch	·	1.9 km	MPC · JPL
192386	1996 RE_{14}	—	September 8, 1996	Kitt Peak	Spacewatch	L4	10 km	MPC · JPL
192387	1996 RV_{15}	—	September 13, 1996	Kitt Peak	Spacewatch	·	3.3 km	MPC · JPL
192388	1996 RD_{29}	—	September 11, 1996	La Silla	Uppsala-DLR Trojan Survey	L4 · ERY	10 km	MPC · JPL
192389	1996 RT_{29}	—	September 12, 1996	La Silla	Uppsala-DLR Trojan Survey	L4	16 km	MPC · JPL
192390	1996 RO_{30}	—	September 13, 1996	La Silla	Uppsala-DLR Trojan Survey	L4	10 km	MPC · JPL
192391 Yunda	1996 TQ_{2}	Yunda	October 3, 1996	Xinglong	SCAP	·	3.9 km	MPC · JPL
192392	1996 TM_{18}	—	October 4, 1996	Kitt Peak	Spacewatch	·	2.0 km	MPC · JPL
192393	1996 TT_{22}	—	October 6, 1996	Kitt Peak	Spacewatch	L4	10 km	MPC · JPL
192394	1996 TJ_{35}	—	October 11, 1996	Kitt Peak	Spacewatch	V	1.1 km	MPC · JPL
192395	1996 TN_{36}	—	October 12, 1996	Kitt Peak	Spacewatch	·	1.8 km	MPC · JPL
192396	1996 XP_{3}	—	December 1, 1996	Kitt Peak	Spacewatch	·	1.9 km	MPC · JPL
192397	1996 XZ_{5}	—	December 7, 1996	Oizumi	T. Kobayashi	(5)	2.2 km	MPC · JPL
192398	1996 XL_{10}	—	December 2, 1996	Kitt Peak	Spacewatch	·	1.6 km	MPC · JPL
192399	1996 XL_{29}	—	December 13, 1996	Kitt Peak	Spacewatch	·	1.6 km	MPC · JPL
192400	1997 AG_{2}	—	January 3, 1997	Oizumi	T. Kobayashi	(5)	2.5 km	MPC · JPL

== 192401–192500 ==
back to top

Designation			Discovery			Properties		Ref
Permanent	Provisional	Named after	Date	Site	Discoverer(s)	Category	Diam.	Ref
192401	1997 AR_{8}	—	January 2, 1997	Kitt Peak	Spacewatch	·	4.8 km	MPC · JPL
192402	1997 AW_{12}	—	January 10, 1997	Oizumi	T. Kobayashi	·	2.2 km	MPC · JPL
192403	1997 BQ_{4}	—	January 31, 1997	Kitt Peak	Spacewatch	·	2.6 km	MPC · JPL
192404	1997 EE_{19}	—	March 3, 1997	Kitt Peak	Spacewatch	·	2.1 km	MPC · JPL
192405	1997 EU_{21}	—	March 4, 1997	Kitt Peak	Spacewatch	·	2.2 km	MPC · JPL
192406	1997 EK_{26}	—	March 4, 1997	Kitt Peak	Spacewatch	WIT	1.2 km	MPC · JPL
192407	1997 EY_{30}	—	March 5, 1997	Kitt Peak	Spacewatch	·	2.3 km	MPC · JPL
192408	1997 GD_{1}	—	April 2, 1997	Kitt Peak	Spacewatch	·	2.9 km	MPC · JPL
192409	1997 GX_{13}	—	April 3, 1997	Socorro	LINEAR	·	2.0 km	MPC · JPL
192410	1997 GD_{25}	—	April 7, 1997	Kitt Peak	Spacewatch	·	2.6 km	MPC · JPL
192411	1997 GX_{31}	—	April 15, 1997	Kitt Peak	Spacewatch	·	1.4 km	MPC · JPL
192412	1997 HQ_{7}	—	April 30, 1997	Socorro	LINEAR	·	910 m	MPC · JPL
192413	1997 HN_{9}	—	April 30, 1997	Socorro	LINEAR	·	2.7 km	MPC · JPL
192414	1997 LG_{17}	—	June 8, 1997	La Silla	E. W. Elst	·	880 m	MPC · JPL
192415	1997 LM_{18}	—	June 8, 1997	Kitt Peak	Spacewatch	·	1.1 km	MPC · JPL
192416	1997 MA_{1}	—	June 28, 1997	Rand	G. R. Viscome	H	860 m	MPC · JPL
192417	1997 NS_{7}	—	July 7, 1997	Kitt Peak	Spacewatch	·	2.9 km	MPC · JPL
192418	1997 PC_{3}	—	August 10, 1997	Ondřejov	P. Pravec	·	4.6 km	MPC · JPL
192419	1997 SM_{18}	—	September 28, 1997	Kitt Peak	Spacewatch	·	3.9 km	MPC · JPL
192420	1997 SP_{20}	—	September 28, 1997	Kitt Peak	Spacewatch	·	2.2 km	MPC · JPL
192421	1997 SU_{20}	—	September 28, 1997	Kitt Peak	Spacewatch	·	4.0 km	MPC · JPL
192422	1997 SH_{21}	—	September 29, 1997	Kitt Peak	Spacewatch	·	1.3 km	MPC · JPL
192423	1997 SM_{26}	—	September 28, 1997	Kitt Peak	Spacewatch	L4	10 km	MPC · JPL
192424	1997 SL_{30}	—	September 30, 1997	Kitt Peak	Spacewatch	·	1.8 km	MPC · JPL
192425	1997 ST_{35}	—	September 29, 1997	Kitt Peak	Spacewatch	·	2.7 km	MPC · JPL
192426	1997 TJ_{3}	—	October 3, 1997	Caussols	ODAS	HYG	3.8 km	MPC · JPL
192427	1997 TD_{4}	—	October 3, 1997	Caussols	ODAS	MAS	880 m	MPC · JPL
192428	1997 TZ_{5}	—	October 2, 1997	Caussols	ODAS	·	4.3 km	MPC · JPL
192429	1997 TO_{9}	—	October 2, 1997	Kitt Peak	Spacewatch	·	1.6 km	MPC · JPL
192430	1997 TD_{13}	—	October 3, 1997	Kitt Peak	Spacewatch	NYS	970 m	MPC · JPL
192431	1997 TS_{21}	—	October 4, 1997	Kitt Peak	Spacewatch	·	1.1 km	MPC · JPL
192432	1997 TA_{24}	—	October 11, 1997	Kitt Peak	Spacewatch	NYS	1.4 km	MPC · JPL
192433	1997 TL_{26}	—	October 8, 1997	Uenohara	N. Kawasato	·	1.7 km	MPC · JPL
192434	1997 US_{1}	—	October 23, 1997	Kitt Peak	Spacewatch	·	4.3 km	MPC · JPL
192435	1997 UJ_{2}	—	October 24, 1997	Kitt Peak	Spacewatch	·	1.9 km	MPC · JPL
192436	1997 UU_{6}	—	October 23, 1997	Kitt Peak	Spacewatch	·	1.7 km	MPC · JPL
192437	1997 UA_{16}	—	October 23, 1997	Kitt Peak	Spacewatch	·	3.1 km	MPC · JPL
192438	1997 UN_{27}	—	October 26, 1997	Cima Ekar	Cima Ekar	·	1.6 km	MPC · JPL
192439 Cílek	1997 VC	Cílek	November 1, 1997	Kleť	J. Tichá, M. Tichý	NYS	1.5 km	MPC · JPL
192440	1997 VH_{7}	—	November 2, 1997	Xinglong	SCAP	·	2.2 km	MPC · JPL
192441	1997 WH_{1}	—	November 19, 1997	Xinglong	SCAP	·	1.8 km	MPC · JPL
192442	1997 WJ_{3}	—	November 22, 1997	Kitt Peak	Spacewatch	L4	15 km	MPC · JPL
192443	1997 WY_{5}	—	November 23, 1997	Kitt Peak	Spacewatch	·	2.8 km	MPC · JPL
192444	1997 WY_{9}	—	November 21, 1997	Kitt Peak	Spacewatch	MAS	880 m	MPC · JPL
192445	1997 WG_{14}	—	November 22, 1997	Kitt Peak	Spacewatch	THM	3.4 km	MPC · JPL
192446	1997 WA_{15}	—	November 23, 1997	Kitt Peak	Spacewatch	·	1.2 km	MPC · JPL
192447	1997 WR_{15}	—	November 23, 1997	Kitt Peak	Spacewatch	MAS	1.2 km	MPC · JPL
192448	1997 WY_{15}	—	November 23, 1997	Kitt Peak	Spacewatch	L4	10 km	MPC · JPL
192449	1997 WG_{20}	—	November 25, 1997	Kitt Peak	Spacewatch	NYS	1.6 km	MPC · JPL
192450 Xinjiangdaxue	1997 WY_{21}	Xinjiangdaxue	November 23, 1997	Xinglong	SCAP	·	7.5 km	MPC · JPL
192451	1997 WQ_{42}	—	November 29, 1997	Socorro	LINEAR	NYS	2.5 km	MPC · JPL
192452	1997 YQ_{2}	—	December 21, 1997	Chichibu	N. Satō	·	5.0 km	MPC · JPL
192453	1998 BV_{3}	—	January 18, 1998	Kitt Peak	Spacewatch	·	1.3 km	MPC · JPL
192454	1998 BQ_{5}	—	January 22, 1998	Kitt Peak	Spacewatch	HYG	3.6 km	MPC · JPL
192455	1998 BQ_{20}	—	January 22, 1998	Kitt Peak	Spacewatch	THM	4.5 km	MPC · JPL
192456	1998 BU_{23}	—	January 26, 1998	Kitt Peak	Spacewatch	·	2.1 km	MPC · JPL
192457	1998 BM_{33}	—	January 31, 1998	Oizumi	T. Kobayashi	·	2.5 km	MPC · JPL
192458	1998 DG_{1}	—	February 19, 1998	Kleť	Kleť	·	4.9 km	MPC · JPL
192459	1998 DS_{6}	—	February 17, 1998	Kitt Peak	Spacewatch	EUN	2.2 km	MPC · JPL
192460	1998 DT_{16}	—	February 22, 1998	Kitt Peak	Spacewatch	VER	5.9 km	MPC · JPL
192461	1998 DE_{19}	—	February 24, 1998	Kitt Peak	Spacewatch	NYS	1.2 km	MPC · JPL
192462	1998 EZ_{7}	—	March 2, 1998	Xinglong	SCAP	·	2.0 km	MPC · JPL
192463	1998 FU_{4}	—	March 23, 1998	Kitt Peak	Spacewatch	RAF	1.3 km	MPC · JPL
192464	1998 FJ_{8}	—	March 20, 1998	Kitt Peak	Spacewatch	·	2.0 km	MPC · JPL
192465	1998 FM_{14}	—	March 26, 1998	Caussols	ODAS	·	2.2 km	MPC · JPL
192466	1998 FJ_{16}	—	March 30, 1998	Kleť	Kleť	·	1.7 km	MPC · JPL
192467	1998 FH_{28}	—	March 20, 1998	Socorro	LINEAR	·	2.9 km	MPC · JPL
192468	1998 FH_{40}	—	March 20, 1998	Socorro	LINEAR	·	2.7 km	MPC · JPL
192469	1998 FF_{48}	—	March 20, 1998	Socorro	LINEAR	·	2.2 km	MPC · JPL
192470	1998 FV_{53}	—	March 20, 1998	Socorro	LINEAR	·	2.8 km	MPC · JPL
192471	1998 FF_{59}	—	March 20, 1998	Socorro	LINEAR	MAS	1.3 km	MPC · JPL
192472	1998 FO_{64}	—	March 20, 1998	Socorro	LINEAR	EUN	2.0 km	MPC · JPL
192473	1998 FX_{71}	—	March 20, 1998	Socorro	LINEAR	·	3.0 km	MPC · JPL
192474	1998 FM_{72}	—	March 20, 1998	Socorro	LINEAR	·	2.8 km	MPC · JPL
192475	1998 FR_{122}	—	March 20, 1998	Socorro	LINEAR	·	3.2 km	MPC · JPL
192476	1998 FN_{133}	—	March 20, 1998	Socorro	LINEAR	·	1.7 km	MPC · JPL
192477	1998 FF_{134}	—	March 20, 1998	Socorro	LINEAR	·	1.7 km	MPC · JPL
192478	1998 FM_{138}	—	March 28, 1998	Socorro	LINEAR	RAF	1.3 km	MPC · JPL
192479	1998 FO_{138}	—	March 28, 1998	Socorro	LINEAR	·	1.6 km	MPC · JPL
192480	1998 FZ_{138}	—	March 28, 1998	Socorro	LINEAR	·	3.5 km	MPC · JPL
192481	1998 GQ_{2}	—	April 2, 1998	Socorro	LINEAR	·	3.5 km	MPC · JPL
192482	1998 GS_{8}	—	April 2, 1998	Socorro	LINEAR	T_{j} (2.96)	8.4 km	MPC · JPL
192483	1998 HS_{2}	—	April 20, 1998	Kitt Peak	Spacewatch	·	2.0 km	MPC · JPL
192484	1998 HE_{4}	—	April 19, 1998	Kitt Peak	Spacewatch	·	2.1 km	MPC · JPL
192485	1998 HM_{5}	—	April 22, 1998	Kitt Peak	Spacewatch	·	1.6 km	MPC · JPL
192486	1998 HP_{7}	—	April 23, 1998	Socorro	LINEAR	·	3.4 km	MPC · JPL
192487	1998 HG_{11}	—	April 18, 1998	Kitt Peak	Spacewatch	·	3.9 km	MPC · JPL
192488	1998 HK_{22}	—	April 20, 1998	Socorro	LINEAR	·	2.4 km	MPC · JPL
192489	1998 HU_{22}	—	April 20, 1998	Socorro	LINEAR	·	3.1 km	MPC · JPL
192490	1998 HU_{23}	—	April 28, 1998	Kitt Peak	Spacewatch	·	1.7 km	MPC · JPL
192491	1998 HU_{27}	—	April 22, 1998	Kitt Peak	Spacewatch	·	2.2 km	MPC · JPL
192492	1998 HA_{35}	—	April 20, 1998	Socorro	LINEAR	·	3.5 km	MPC · JPL
192493	1998 HG_{42}	—	April 24, 1998	Kitt Peak	Spacewatch	·	2.3 km	MPC · JPL
192494	1998 HF_{62}	—	April 21, 1998	Socorro	LINEAR	EUN	3.3 km	MPC · JPL
192495	1998 HJ_{64}	—	April 21, 1998	Socorro	LINEAR	·	4.1 km	MPC · JPL
192496	1998 HS_{66}	—	April 21, 1998	Socorro	LINEAR	(5)	2.0 km	MPC · JPL
192497	1998 HJ_{89}	—	April 21, 1998	Socorro	LINEAR	·	1.4 km	MPC · JPL
192498	1998 KA_{7}	—	May 22, 1998	Anderson Mesa	LONEOS	·	4.6 km	MPC · JPL
192499	1998 KT_{10}	—	May 22, 1998	Kitt Peak	Spacewatch	·	2.1 km	MPC · JPL
192500	1998 KT_{15}	—	May 22, 1998	Socorro	LINEAR	EUN	2.2 km	MPC · JPL

== 192501–192600 ==
back to top

Designation			Discovery			Properties		Ref
Permanent	Provisional	Named after	Date	Site	Discoverer(s)	Category	Diam.	Ref
192501	1998 KD_{17}	—	May 26, 1998	Kitt Peak	Spacewatch	·	4.0 km	MPC · JPL
192502	1998 KN_{26}	—	May 26, 1998	Kitt Peak	Spacewatch	·	2.7 km	MPC · JPL
192503	1998 KO_{32}	—	May 22, 1998	Socorro	LINEAR	·	2.7 km	MPC · JPL
192504	1998 MC_{14}	—	June 20, 1998	Caussols	ODAS	·	4.1 km	MPC · JPL
192505	1998 MU_{14}	—	June 20, 1998	Kitt Peak	Spacewatch	·	2.5 km	MPC · JPL
192506	1998 MS_{15}	—	June 25, 1998	Kitt Peak	Spacewatch	·	2.7 km	MPC · JPL
192507	1998 MQ_{37}	—	June 24, 1998	Anderson Mesa	LONEOS	·	1.4 km	MPC · JPL
192508	1998 OP_{13}	—	July 26, 1998	La Silla	E. W. Elst	·	1.1 km	MPC · JPL
192509	1998 QL_{5}	—	August 22, 1998	Xinglong	SCAP	·	1.1 km	MPC · JPL
192510 Pengkunchi	1998 QX_{29}	Pengkunchi	August 25, 1998	Xinglong	SCAP	BRA	2.5 km	MPC · JPL
192511	1998 QR_{73}	—	August 24, 1998	Socorro	LINEAR	·	3.8 km	MPC · JPL
192512	1998 QB_{76}	—	August 24, 1998	Socorro	LINEAR	BRA	2.6 km	MPC · JPL
192513	1998 QZ_{103}	—	August 26, 1998	La Silla	E. W. Elst	·	1.0 km	MPC · JPL
192514	1998 RP_{12}	—	September 14, 1998	Kitt Peak	Spacewatch	·	2.6 km	MPC · JPL
192515 Xinanjiaoda	1998 RS_{15}	Xinanjiaoda	September 1, 1998	Xinglong	SCAP	·	1.1 km	MPC · JPL
192516	1998 RK_{16}	—	September 10, 1998	Caussols	ODAS	·	980 m	MPC · JPL
192517	1998 RF_{20}	—	September 14, 1998	Socorro	LINEAR	BRA	2.9 km	MPC · JPL
192518	1998 RW_{29}	—	September 14, 1998	Socorro	LINEAR	·	4.7 km	MPC · JPL
192519	1998 RE_{48}	—	September 14, 1998	Socorro	LINEAR	·	1.1 km	MPC · JPL
192520	1998 RS_{63}	—	September 14, 1998	Socorro	LINEAR	·	1.1 km	MPC · JPL
192521	1998 RK_{67}	—	September 14, 1998	Socorro	LINEAR	·	1.3 km	MPC · JPL
192522	1998 RJ_{76}	—	September 14, 1998	Socorro	LINEAR	·	1.3 km	MPC · JPL
192523	1998 RT_{80}	—	September 13, 1998	Kitt Peak	Spacewatch	·	1.0 km	MPC · JPL
192524	1998 RY_{80}	—	September 15, 1998	Anderson Mesa	LONEOS	·	1.0 km	MPC · JPL
192525	1998 SM_{12}	—	September 21, 1998	Višnjan Observatory	Višnjan	·	2.9 km	MPC · JPL
192526	1998 SP_{15}	—	September 16, 1998	Kitt Peak	Spacewatch	KOR	1.8 km	MPC · JPL
192527	1998 ST_{17}	—	September 17, 1998	Kitt Peak	Spacewatch	·	1.0 km	MPC · JPL
192528	1998 SG_{41}	—	September 25, 1998	Kitt Peak	Spacewatch	·	3.4 km	MPC · JPL
192529	1998 SU_{48}	—	September 27, 1998	Kitt Peak	Spacewatch	·	1.1 km	MPC · JPL
192530	1998 SE_{52}	—	September 28, 1998	Kitt Peak	Spacewatch	·	940 m	MPC · JPL
192531	1998 SC_{62}	—	September 18, 1998	Anderson Mesa	LONEOS	·	1.2 km	MPC · JPL
192532	1998 SZ_{63}	—	September 20, 1998	La Silla	E. W. Elst	·	1.4 km	MPC · JPL
192533	1998 SB_{70}	—	September 21, 1998	Socorro	LINEAR	·	1.1 km	MPC · JPL
192534	1998 SN_{80}	—	September 26, 1998	Socorro	LINEAR	·	1.3 km	MPC · JPL
192535	1998 SW_{85}	—	September 26, 1998	Socorro	LINEAR	·	820 m	MPC · JPL
192536	1998 SF_{88}	—	September 26, 1998	Socorro	LINEAR	·	920 m	MPC · JPL
192537	1998 SL_{89}	—	September 26, 1998	Socorro	LINEAR	·	890 m	MPC · JPL
192538	1998 SE_{97}	—	September 26, 1998	Socorro	LINEAR	·	970 m	MPC · JPL
192539	1998 SC_{119}	—	September 26, 1998	Socorro	LINEAR	·	1.3 km	MPC · JPL
192540	1998 SN_{120}	—	September 26, 1998	Socorro	LINEAR	·	990 m	MPC · JPL
192541	1998 SY_{124}	—	September 26, 1998	Socorro	LINEAR	·	1.2 km	MPC · JPL
192542	1998 SO_{144}	—	September 20, 1998	La Silla	E. W. Elst	·	960 m	MPC · JPL
192543	1998 SD_{146}	—	September 20, 1998	La Silla	E. W. Elst	EOS	4.3 km	MPC · JPL
192544	1998 SM_{157}	—	September 26, 1998	Socorro	LINEAR	·	940 m	MPC · JPL
192545	1998 SS_{160}	—	September 26, 1998	Socorro	LINEAR	·	1.2 km	MPC · JPL
192546	1998 TE_{1}	—	October 12, 1998	Kitt Peak	Spacewatch	·	1.0 km	MPC · JPL
192547	1998 TW_{6}	—	October 1, 1998	Kitt Peak	Spacewatch	·	750 m	MPC · JPL
192548	1998 TE_{7}	—	October 14, 1998	Caussols	ODAS	·	2.4 km	MPC · JPL
192549	1998 TJ_{14}	—	October 14, 1998	Kitt Peak	Spacewatch	·	2.3 km	MPC · JPL
192550	1998 TC_{20}	—	October 13, 1998	Kitt Peak	Spacewatch	·	1.7 km	MPC · JPL
192551	1998 TY_{24}	—	October 14, 1998	Kitt Peak	Spacewatch	·	2.4 km	MPC · JPL
192552	1998 TP_{26}	—	October 14, 1998	Kitt Peak	Spacewatch	·	3.3 km	MPC · JPL
192553	1998 TH_{27}	—	October 15, 1998	Kitt Peak	Spacewatch	·	740 m	MPC · JPL
192554	1998 TU_{27}	—	October 15, 1998	Kitt Peak	Spacewatch	KOR	1.9 km	MPC · JPL
192555	1998 TV_{27}	—	October 15, 1998	Kitt Peak	Spacewatch	BRA	2.0 km	MPC · JPL
192556	1998 UP_{5}	—	October 22, 1998	Caussols	ODAS	·	3.2 km	MPC · JPL
192557	1998 UE_{13}	—	October 18, 1998	Kitt Peak	Spacewatch	·	930 m	MPC · JPL
192558	1998 UM_{44}	—	October 17, 1998	Xinglong	SCAP	EOS	3.1 km	MPC · JPL
192559	1998 VO	—	November 10, 1998	Socorro	LINEAR	APO · PHA	290 m	MPC · JPL
192560	1998 VT	—	November 11, 1998	Anderson Mesa	LONEOS	H	1.3 km	MPC · JPL
192561	1998 VA_{9}	—	November 10, 1998	Socorro	LINEAR	·	930 m	MPC · JPL
192562	1998 VP_{17}	—	November 10, 1998	Socorro	LINEAR	·	1.3 km	MPC · JPL
192563	1998 WZ_{6}	—	November 23, 1998	Oizumi	T. Kobayashi	APO +1km · PHA	1.2 km	MPC · JPL
192564	1998 WL_{22}	—	November 18, 1998	Socorro	LINEAR	·	920 m	MPC · JPL
192565	1998 WS_{34}	—	November 17, 1998	Kitt Peak	Spacewatch	·	860 m	MPC · JPL
192566	1998 WA_{35}	—	November 18, 1998	Kitt Peak	Spacewatch	KOR	1.9 km	MPC · JPL
192567	1998 WD_{35}	—	November 18, 1998	Kitt Peak	Spacewatch	KOR	1.8 km	MPC · JPL
192568	1998 WZ_{35}	—	November 19, 1998	Kitt Peak	Spacewatch	·	1.3 km	MPC · JPL
192569	1998 WB_{36}	—	November 19, 1998	Kitt Peak	Spacewatch	·	4.7 km	MPC · JPL
192570	1998 WS_{36}	—	November 19, 1998	Kitt Peak	Spacewatch	V	990 m	MPC · JPL
192571	1998 WR_{38}	—	November 21, 1998	Kitt Peak	Spacewatch	·	3.3 km	MPC · JPL
192572	1998 WS_{40}	—	November 23, 1998	Kitt Peak	Spacewatch	·	6.2 km	MPC · JPL
192573	1998 XL	—	December 6, 1998	San Marcello	L. Tesi, A. Boattini	·	1.7 km	MPC · JPL
192574	1998 XQ_{6}	—	December 8, 1998	Kitt Peak	Spacewatch	·	3.8 km	MPC · JPL
192575	1998 XM_{20}	—	December 10, 1998	Kitt Peak	Spacewatch	·	5.3 km	MPC · JPL
192576	1998 XB_{22}	—	December 10, 1998	Kitt Peak	Spacewatch	·	3.2 km	MPC · JPL
192577	1998 XT_{25}	—	December 14, 1998	Kitt Peak	Spacewatch	·	2.4 km	MPC · JPL
192578	1998 XU_{61}	—	December 15, 1998	Kitt Peak	Spacewatch	·	990 m	MPC · JPL
192579	1998 XN_{62}	—	December 11, 1998	Socorro	LINEAR	EUP	6.8 km	MPC · JPL
192580	1998 XB_{98}	—	December 10, 1998	Kitt Peak	Spacewatch	·	4.9 km	MPC · JPL
192581	1998 YH_{16}	—	December 22, 1998	Kitt Peak	Spacewatch	HYG	5.0 km	MPC · JPL
192582	1998 YF_{18}	—	December 25, 1998	Kitt Peak	Spacewatch	·	2.8 km	MPC · JPL
192583	1999 AY_{9}	—	January 13, 1999	Xinglong	SCAP	H	760 m	MPC · JPL
192584	1999 AY_{14}	—	January 8, 1999	Kitt Peak	Spacewatch	·	2.0 km	MPC · JPL
192585	1999 AX_{22}	—	January 15, 1999	Catalina	CSS	EUP	5.9 km	MPC · JPL
192586	1999 AV_{29}	—	January 13, 1999	Kitt Peak	Spacewatch	·	1.4 km	MPC · JPL
192587	1999 AA_{31}	—	January 14, 1999	Kitt Peak	Spacewatch	·	4.5 km	MPC · JPL
192588	1999 BH_{1}	—	January 18, 1999	Kleť	Kleť	·	1.2 km	MPC · JPL
192589	1999 BM_{11}	—	January 20, 1999	Caussols	ODAS	THM	5.0 km	MPC · JPL
192590	1999 BW_{11}	—	January 21, 1999	Caussols	ODAS	·	1.8 km	MPC · JPL
192591	1999 CE_{8}	—	February 13, 1999	Eskridge	G. Hug, G. Bell	LIX	5.9 km	MPC · JPL
192592	1999 CB_{11}	—	February 12, 1999	Socorro	LINEAR	PHO	1.4 km	MPC · JPL
192593	1999 CJ_{26}	—	February 10, 1999	Socorro	LINEAR	·	6.0 km	MPC · JPL
192594	1999 CO_{37}	—	February 10, 1999	Socorro	LINEAR	·	5.1 km	MPC · JPL
192595	1999 CS_{47}	—	February 10, 1999	Socorro	LINEAR	·	7.4 km	MPC · JPL
192596	1999 CU_{87}	—	February 10, 1999	Socorro	LINEAR	·	1.3 km	MPC · JPL
192597	1999 CW_{95}	—	February 10, 1999	Socorro	LINEAR	·	3.4 km	MPC · JPL
192598	1999 CV_{126}	—	February 11, 1999	Socorro	LINEAR	·	7.7 km	MPC · JPL
192599	1999 CT_{137}	—	February 9, 1999	Kitt Peak	Spacewatch	V	910 m	MPC · JPL
192600	1999 CE_{147}	—	February 9, 1999	Kitt Peak	Spacewatch	MAS	930 m	MPC · JPL

== 192601–192700 ==
back to top

Designation			Discovery			Properties		Ref
Permanent	Provisional	Named after	Date	Site	Discoverer(s)	Category	Diam.	Ref
192601	1999 CK_{159}	—	February 9, 1999	Kitt Peak	Spacewatch	NYS	2.4 km	MPC · JPL
192602	1999 EQ_{2}	—	March 10, 1999	Kitt Peak	Spacewatch	MAS	900 m	MPC · JPL
192603	1999 EA_{9}	—	March 15, 1999	Kitt Peak	Spacewatch	·	1.0 km	MPC · JPL
192604	1999 EO_{13}	—	March 10, 1999	Kitt Peak	Spacewatch	VER	4.3 km	MPC · JPL
192605	1999 FE_{12}	—	March 18, 1999	Kitt Peak	Spacewatch	LIX	7.4 km	MPC · JPL
192606	1999 FE_{42}	—	March 20, 1999	Socorro	LINEAR	·	4.1 km	MPC · JPL
192607	1999 FB_{60}	—	March 19, 1999	Kitt Peak	Spacewatch	·	2.0 km	MPC · JPL
192608	1999 FH_{60}	—	March 19, 1999	Caussols	ODAS	·	1.9 km	MPC · JPL
192609 Orlaparker	1999 GY_{3}	Orlaparker	April 12, 1999	Cocoa	I. P. Griffin	·	2.6 km	MPC · JPL
192610	1999 GH_{10}	—	April 11, 1999	Kitt Peak	Spacewatch	·	2.0 km	MPC · JPL
192611	1999 GX_{26}	—	April 7, 1999	Socorro	LINEAR	NYS	2.0 km	MPC · JPL
192612	1999 GT_{39}	—	April 12, 1999	Socorro	LINEAR	·	1.6 km	MPC · JPL
192613	1999 GL_{46}	—	April 12, 1999	Socorro	LINEAR	·	2.5 km	MPC · JPL
192614	1999 GY_{54}	—	April 6, 1999	Kitt Peak	Spacewatch	·	3.4 km	MPC · JPL
192615	1999 GP_{56}	—	April 9, 1999	Kitt Peak	Spacewatch	·	1.4 km	MPC · JPL
192616	1999 GF_{58}	—	April 7, 1999	Socorro	LINEAR	·	2.1 km	MPC · JPL
192617	1999 HX_{9}	—	April 17, 1999	Socorro	LINEAR	·	3.3 km	MPC · JPL
192618	1999 JP_{4}	—	May 10, 1999	Socorro	LINEAR	H	930 m	MPC · JPL
192619	1999 JQ_{4}	—	May 10, 1999	Socorro	LINEAR	PHO	1.9 km	MPC · JPL
192620	1999 JV_{5}	—	May 12, 1999	Socorro	LINEAR	PHO	3.2 km	MPC · JPL
192621	1999 JN_{11}	—	May 10, 1999	Socorro	LINEAR	·	3.0 km	MPC · JPL
192622	1999 JW_{26}	—	May 10, 1999	Socorro	LINEAR	·	3.5 km	MPC · JPL
192623	1999 JR_{36}	—	May 10, 1999	Socorro	LINEAR	·	2.0 km	MPC · JPL
192624	1999 JJ_{44}	—	May 10, 1999	Socorro	LINEAR	·	2.3 km	MPC · JPL
192625	1999 JS_{101}	—	May 13, 1999	Socorro	LINEAR	·	3.1 km	MPC · JPL
192626 Glennunderhill	1999 JR_{133}	Glennunderhill	May 14, 1999	Catalina	CSS	·	2.0 km	MPC · JPL
192627	1999 KS	—	May 16, 1999	Catalina	CSS	·	1.7 km	MPC · JPL
192628	1999 KK_{3}	—	May 17, 1999	Kitt Peak	Spacewatch	·	1.8 km	MPC · JPL
192629	1999 KM_{11}	—	May 18, 1999	Socorro	LINEAR	·	1.8 km	MPC · JPL
192630	1999 LL	—	June 5, 1999	Woomera	F. B. Zoltowski	·	2.2 km	MPC · JPL
192631	1999 LG_{29}	—	June 9, 1999	Kitt Peak	Spacewatch	·	1.9 km	MPC · JPL
192632	1999 NL_{53}	—	July 12, 1999	Socorro	LINEAR	·	3.0 km	MPC · JPL
192633	1999 NT_{56}	—	July 12, 1999	Socorro	LINEAR	EUN	2.6 km	MPC · JPL
192634	1999 NF_{60}	—	July 13, 1999	Socorro	LINEAR	·	3.2 km	MPC · JPL
192635	1999 QT	—	August 17, 1999	Kitt Peak	Spacewatch	·	2.6 km	MPC · JPL
192636	1999 QL_{2}	—	August 31, 1999	Ondřejov	L. Kotková	·	4.0 km	MPC · JPL
192637	1999 RD_{6}	—	September 3, 1999	Kitt Peak	Spacewatch	·	2.7 km	MPC · JPL
192638	1999 RC_{10}	—	September 7, 1999	Socorro	LINEAR	·	3.7 km	MPC · JPL
192639	1999 RR_{20}	—	September 7, 1999	Socorro	LINEAR	GAL	2.2 km	MPC · JPL
192640	1999 RY_{20}	—	September 7, 1999	Socorro	LINEAR	·	3.3 km	MPC · JPL
192641	1999 RG_{23}	—	September 7, 1999	Socorro	LINEAR	·	2.9 km	MPC · JPL
192642	1999 RD_{32}	—	September 8, 1999	Socorro	LINEAR	T_{j} (2.87) · APO +1km	1.8 km	MPC · JPL
192643	1999 RG_{39}	—	September 6, 1999	Catalina	CSS	JUN	1.8 km	MPC · JPL
192644	1999 RS_{39}	—	September 7, 1999	Catalina	CSS	·	4.6 km	MPC · JPL
192645	1999 RJ_{47}	—	September 7, 1999	Socorro	LINEAR	JUN	1.7 km	MPC · JPL
192646	1999 RZ_{67}	—	September 7, 1999	Socorro	LINEAR	·	2.2 km	MPC · JPL
192647	1999 RU_{71}	—	September 7, 1999	Socorro	LINEAR	·	2.5 km	MPC · JPL
192648	1999 RO_{76}	—	September 7, 1999	Socorro	LINEAR	·	2.5 km	MPC · JPL
192649	1999 RV_{78}	—	September 7, 1999	Socorro	LINEAR	EUN	2.5 km	MPC · JPL
192650	1999 RF_{80}	—	September 7, 1999	Socorro	LINEAR	·	3.1 km	MPC · JPL
192651	1999 RS_{80}	—	September 7, 1999	Socorro	LINEAR	MIS	4.5 km	MPC · JPL
192652	1999 RM_{81}	—	September 7, 1999	Socorro	LINEAR	·	3.3 km	MPC · JPL
192653	1999 RD_{103}	—	September 8, 1999	Socorro	LINEAR	EUN	2.2 km	MPC · JPL
192654	1999 RZ_{106}	—	September 8, 1999	Socorro	LINEAR	·	3.6 km	MPC · JPL
192655	1999 RQ_{107}	—	September 8, 1999	Socorro	LINEAR	·	3.4 km	MPC · JPL
192656	1999 RF_{121}	—	September 9, 1999	Socorro	LINEAR	JUN	1.6 km	MPC · JPL
192657	1999 RD_{125}	—	September 9, 1999	Socorro	LINEAR	·	3.0 km	MPC · JPL
192658	1999 RU_{130}	—	September 9, 1999	Socorro	LINEAR	·	3.4 km	MPC · JPL
192659	1999 RJ_{134}	—	September 9, 1999	Socorro	LINEAR	·	3.9 km	MPC · JPL
192660	1999 RD_{150}	—	September 9, 1999	Socorro	LINEAR	EUN	2.3 km	MPC · JPL
192661	1999 RU_{155}	—	September 9, 1999	Socorro	LINEAR	·	2.6 km	MPC · JPL
192662	1999 RK_{161}	—	September 9, 1999	Socorro	LINEAR	·	2.8 km	MPC · JPL
192663	1999 RS_{169}	—	September 9, 1999	Socorro	LINEAR	·	3.7 km	MPC · JPL
192664	1999 RK_{179}	—	September 9, 1999	Socorro	LINEAR	·	3.2 km	MPC · JPL
192665	1999 RS_{181}	—	September 14, 1999	Kitt Peak	Spacewatch	(11882)	2.5 km	MPC · JPL
192666	1999 RC_{189}	—	September 9, 1999	Socorro	LINEAR	MIS	3.1 km	MPC · JPL
192667	1999 RC_{199}	—	September 10, 1999	Socorro	LINEAR	EUN	2.4 km	MPC · JPL
192668	1999 RQ_{199}	—	September 8, 1999	Socorro	LINEAR	ADE	3.6 km	MPC · JPL
192669	1999 RD_{203}	—	September 8, 1999	Socorro	LINEAR	·	3.6 km	MPC · JPL
192670	1999 RR_{206}	—	September 8, 1999	Socorro	LINEAR	·	3.1 km	MPC · JPL
192671	1999 RF_{213}	—	September 11, 1999	Socorro	LINEAR	·	2.5 km	MPC · JPL
192672	1999 RW_{219}	—	September 4, 1999	Catalina	CSS	·	2.9 km	MPC · JPL
192673	1999 RD_{222}	—	September 7, 1999	Catalina	CSS	JUN	2.2 km	MPC · JPL
192674	1999 RB_{224}	—	September 7, 1999	Catalina	CSS	·	3.1 km	MPC · JPL
192675	1999 RG_{226}	—	September 4, 1999	Catalina	CSS	·	3.5 km	MPC · JPL
192676	1999 RK_{239}	—	September 8, 1999	Catalina	CSS	·	3.1 km	MPC · JPL
192677	1999 RR_{252}	—	September 8, 1999	Socorro	LINEAR	·	2.5 km	MPC · JPL
192678	1999 SM_{10}	—	September 30, 1999	Socorro	LINEAR	·	3.2 km	MPC · JPL
192679	1999 SO_{12}	—	September 30, 1999	Socorro	LINEAR	·	2.7 km	MPC · JPL
192680	1999 SE_{17}	—	September 30, 1999	Catalina	CSS	ADE	4.8 km	MPC · JPL
192681	1999 SJ_{21}	—	September 30, 1999	Kitt Peak	Spacewatch	·	2.6 km	MPC · JPL
192682	1999 SF_{26}	—	September 30, 1999	Kitt Peak	Spacewatch	PAD	3.6 km	MPC · JPL
192683	1999 SO_{27}	—	September 29, 1999	Anderson Mesa	LONEOS	·	3.7 km	MPC · JPL
192684	1999 TW_{6}	—	October 6, 1999	Višnjan Observatory	K. Korlević, M. Jurić	·	3.8 km	MPC · JPL
192685	1999 TA_{8}	—	October 7, 1999	Črni Vrh	Mikuž, H.	·	4.4 km	MPC · JPL
192686 Aljuroma	1999 TU_{17}	Aljuroma	October 15, 1999	Bornheim	Ehring, N.	·	3.5 km	MPC · JPL
192687	1999 TC_{21}	—	October 7, 1999	Goodricke-Pigott	R. A. Tucker	·	3.5 km	MPC · JPL
192688	1999 TQ_{22}	—	October 3, 1999	Kitt Peak	Spacewatch	·	2.4 km	MPC · JPL
192689	1999 TF_{25}	—	October 3, 1999	Socorro	LINEAR	·	2.8 km	MPC · JPL
192690	1999 TO_{35}	—	October 4, 1999	Socorro	LINEAR	(1547)	2.4 km	MPC · JPL
192691	1999 TY_{39}	—	October 3, 1999	Catalina	CSS	·	3.3 km	MPC · JPL
192692	1999 TH_{41}	—	October 2, 1999	Kitt Peak	Spacewatch	·	3.0 km	MPC · JPL
192693	1999 TH_{42}	—	October 3, 1999	Kitt Peak	Spacewatch	·	1.7 km	MPC · JPL
192694	1999 TM_{44}	—	October 3, 1999	Kitt Peak	Spacewatch	AGN	1.5 km	MPC · JPL
192695	1999 TB_{48}	—	October 4, 1999	Kitt Peak	Spacewatch	·	2.3 km	MPC · JPL
192696	1999 TO_{54}	—	October 6, 1999	Kitt Peak	Spacewatch	AGN	1.9 km	MPC · JPL
192697	1999 TB_{60}	—	October 7, 1999	Kitt Peak	Spacewatch	AGN	1.5 km	MPC · JPL
192698	1999 TF_{60}	—	October 7, 1999	Kitt Peak	Spacewatch	WIT	1.2 km	MPC · JPL
192699	1999 TL_{60}	—	October 7, 1999	Kitt Peak	Spacewatch	·	3.4 km	MPC · JPL
192700	1999 TJ_{61}	—	October 7, 1999	Kitt Peak	Spacewatch	PAD	2.1 km	MPC · JPL

== 192701–192800 ==
back to top

Designation			Discovery			Properties		Ref
Permanent	Provisional	Named after	Date	Site	Discoverer(s)	Category	Diam.	Ref
192701	1999 TB_{63}	—	October 7, 1999	Kitt Peak	Spacewatch	·	3.9 km	MPC · JPL
192702	1999 TR_{67}	—	October 8, 1999	Kitt Peak	Spacewatch	KOR	1.9 km	MPC · JPL
192703	1999 TD_{77}	—	October 10, 1999	Kitt Peak	Spacewatch	NEM	3.5 km	MPC · JPL
192704	1999 TQ_{78}	—	October 11, 1999	Kitt Peak	Spacewatch	·	4.5 km	MPC · JPL
192705	1999 TN_{81}	—	October 12, 1999	Kitt Peak	Spacewatch	·	2.1 km	MPC · JPL
192706	1999 TX_{90}	—	October 2, 1999	Socorro	LINEAR	·	3.6 km	MPC · JPL
192707	1999 TM_{94}	—	October 2, 1999	Socorro	LINEAR	·	3.0 km	MPC · JPL
192708	1999 TW_{102}	—	October 2, 1999	Socorro	LINEAR	·	2.1 km	MPC · JPL
192709	1999 TM_{105}	—	October 3, 1999	Socorro	LINEAR	·	2.2 km	MPC · JPL
192710	1999 TF_{107}	—	October 4, 1999	Socorro	LINEAR	(1547)	2.8 km	MPC · JPL
192711	1999 TJ_{107}	—	October 4, 1999	Socorro	LINEAR	·	4.8 km	MPC · JPL
192712	1999 TC_{112}	—	October 4, 1999	Socorro	LINEAR	·	3.3 km	MPC · JPL
192713	1999 TB_{124}	—	October 4, 1999	Socorro	LINEAR	·	2.9 km	MPC · JPL
192714	1999 TN_{125}	—	October 4, 1999	Socorro	LINEAR	·	2.9 km	MPC · JPL
192715	1999 TP_{127}	—	October 4, 1999	Socorro	LINEAR	·	4.2 km	MPC · JPL
192716	1999 TL_{130}	—	October 6, 1999	Socorro	LINEAR	·	3.3 km	MPC · JPL
192717	1999 TJ_{133}	—	October 6, 1999	Socorro	LINEAR	·	2.5 km	MPC · JPL
192718	1999 TM_{138}	—	October 6, 1999	Socorro	LINEAR	·	2.6 km	MPC · JPL
192719	1999 TT_{138}	—	October 6, 1999	Socorro	LINEAR	·	3.1 km	MPC · JPL
192720	1999 TA_{140}	—	October 6, 1999	Socorro	LINEAR	·	4.0 km	MPC · JPL
192721	1999 TH_{145}	—	October 7, 1999	Socorro	LINEAR	·	3.3 km	MPC · JPL
192722	1999 TW_{145}	—	October 7, 1999	Socorro	LINEAR	·	3.7 km	MPC · JPL
192723	1999 TS_{149}	—	October 7, 1999	Socorro	LINEAR	·	2.3 km	MPC · JPL
192724	1999 TF_{157}	—	October 9, 1999	Socorro	LINEAR	·	3.8 km	MPC · JPL
192725	1999 TZ_{159}	—	October 9, 1999	Socorro	LINEAR	·	2.3 km	MPC · JPL
192726	1999 TJ_{161}	—	October 9, 1999	Socorro	LINEAR	·	2.8 km	MPC · JPL
192727	1999 TS_{169}	—	October 10, 1999	Socorro	LINEAR	·	2.8 km	MPC · JPL
192728	1999 TU_{169}	—	October 10, 1999	Socorro	LINEAR	·	3.0 km	MPC · JPL
192729	1999 TR_{182}	—	October 11, 1999	Socorro	LINEAR	·	2.4 km	MPC · JPL
192730	1999 TR_{188}	—	October 12, 1999	Socorro	LINEAR	·	2.6 km	MPC · JPL
192731	1999 TG_{190}	—	October 12, 1999	Socorro	LINEAR	·	3.5 km	MPC · JPL
192732	1999 TF_{192}	—	October 12, 1999	Socorro	LINEAR	·	3.4 km	MPC · JPL
192733	1999 TV_{192}	—	October 12, 1999	Socorro	LINEAR	·	4.1 km	MPC · JPL
192734	1999 TD_{193}	—	October 12, 1999	Socorro	LINEAR	·	3.6 km	MPC · JPL
192735	1999 TK_{193}	—	October 12, 1999	Socorro	LINEAR	·	3.6 km	MPC · JPL
192736	1999 TQ_{201}	—	October 13, 1999	Socorro	LINEAR	·	2.1 km	MPC · JPL
192737	1999 TR_{205}	—	October 13, 1999	Socorro	LINEAR	GEF	2.5 km	MPC · JPL
192738	1999 TU_{212}	—	October 15, 1999	Socorro	LINEAR	·	3.7 km	MPC · JPL
192739	1999 TZ_{213}	—	October 15, 1999	Socorro	LINEAR	·	3.5 km	MPC · JPL
192740	1999 TF_{214}	—	October 15, 1999	Socorro	LINEAR	WIT	1.7 km	MPC · JPL
192741	1999 TX_{214}	—	October 15, 1999	Socorro	LINEAR	·	3.0 km	MPC · JPL
192742	1999 TL_{215}	—	October 15, 1999	Socorro	LINEAR	·	3.9 km	MPC · JPL
192743	1999 TG_{225}	—	October 2, 1999	Kitt Peak	Spacewatch	·	2.3 km	MPC · JPL
192744	1999 TQ_{225}	—	October 2, 1999	Kitt Peak	Spacewatch	·	3.3 km	MPC · JPL
192745	1999 TO_{226}	—	October 3, 1999	Kitt Peak	Spacewatch	·	3.1 km	MPC · JPL
192746	1999 TT_{237}	—	October 4, 1999	Kitt Peak	Spacewatch	·	5.6 km	MPC · JPL
192747	1999 TX_{242}	—	October 4, 1999	Kitt Peak	Spacewatch	·	3.0 km	MPC · JPL
192748	1999 TX_{249}	—	October 9, 1999	Catalina	CSS	·	4.9 km	MPC · JPL
192749	1999 TN_{251}	—	October 9, 1999	Catalina	CSS	·	2.8 km	MPC · JPL
192750	1999 TB_{254}	—	October 11, 1999	Kitt Peak	Spacewatch	HOF	2.8 km	MPC · JPL
192751	1999 TF_{255}	—	October 9, 1999	Kitt Peak	Spacewatch	(12739)	2.6 km	MPC · JPL
192752	1999 TH_{256}	—	October 9, 1999	Socorro	LINEAR	·	3.2 km	MPC · JPL
192753	1999 TD_{259}	—	October 9, 1999	Socorro	LINEAR	·	3.4 km	MPC · JPL
192754	1999 TU_{262}	—	October 15, 1999	Kitt Peak	Spacewatch	·	2.7 km	MPC · JPL
192755	1999 TL_{265}	—	October 3, 1999	Socorro	LINEAR	·	3.7 km	MPC · JPL
192756	1999 TQ_{268}	—	October 3, 1999	Socorro	LINEAR	DOR	4.3 km	MPC · JPL
192757	1999 TH_{270}	—	October 3, 1999	Socorro	LINEAR	·	3.2 km	MPC · JPL
192758	1999 TU_{271}	—	October 3, 1999	Socorro	LINEAR	·	2.5 km	MPC · JPL
192759	1999 TK_{280}	—	October 8, 1999	Socorro	LINEAR	·	4.1 km	MPC · JPL
192760	1999 TH_{289}	—	October 10, 1999	Socorro	LINEAR	GEF	2.1 km	MPC · JPL
192761	1999 TR_{292}	—	October 12, 1999	Socorro	LINEAR	·	5.6 km	MPC · JPL
192762	1999 TR_{293}	—	October 12, 1999	Socorro	LINEAR	·	3.0 km	MPC · JPL
192763	1999 TW_{297}	—	October 2, 1999	Kitt Peak	Spacewatch	MRX	1.6 km	MPC · JPL
192764	1999 TF_{302}	—	October 3, 1999	Catalina	CSS	·	3.4 km	MPC · JPL
192765	1999 TV_{313}	—	October 9, 1999	Socorro	LINEAR	·	2.6 km	MPC · JPL
192766	1999 TH_{315}	—	October 9, 1999	Socorro	LINEAR	·	1.7 km	MPC · JPL
192767	1999 TV_{319}	—	October 9, 1999	Kitt Peak	Spacewatch	·	3.4 km	MPC · JPL
192768	1999 TB_{320}	—	October 10, 1999	Socorro	LINEAR	GEF	2.1 km	MPC · JPL
192769	1999 TF_{321}	—	October 11, 1999	Kitt Peak	Spacewatch	AGN	2.1 km	MPC · JPL
192770	1999 TB_{322}	—	October 8, 1999	Anderson Mesa	LONEOS	·	4.0 km	MPC · JPL
192771	1999 UY_{6}	—	October 29, 1999	Kitt Peak	Spacewatch	·	2.6 km	MPC · JPL
192772	1999 UH_{11}	—	October 31, 1999	Bergisch Gladbach	W. Bickel	AGN	1.9 km	MPC · JPL
192773	1999 UB_{12}	—	October 29, 1999	Kitt Peak	Spacewatch	MRX	1.7 km	MPC · JPL
192774	1999 UY_{12}	—	October 29, 1999	Catalina	CSS	·	2.4 km	MPC · JPL
192775	1999 UE_{16}	—	October 29, 1999	Catalina	CSS	·	2.4 km	MPC · JPL
192776	1999 UQ_{16}	—	October 29, 1999	Catalina	CSS	·	2.9 km	MPC · JPL
192777	1999 UU_{17}	—	October 30, 1999	Kitt Peak	Spacewatch	(12739)	2.2 km	MPC · JPL
192778	1999 UW_{19}	—	October 31, 1999	Kitt Peak	Spacewatch	·	2.1 km	MPC · JPL
192779	1999 UO_{24}	—	October 28, 1999	Catalina	CSS	CLO	4.5 km	MPC · JPL
192780	1999 UY_{24}	—	October 28, 1999	Catalina	CSS	(18466)	3.2 km	MPC · JPL
192781	1999 UG_{25}	—	October 28, 1999	Catalina	CSS	·	1.7 km	MPC · JPL
192782	1999 UU_{25}	—	October 30, 1999	Catalina	CSS	·	2.5 km	MPC · JPL
192783	1999 UV_{26}	—	October 30, 1999	Catalina	CSS	MRX	1.9 km	MPC · JPL
192784	1999 UH_{27}	—	October 30, 1999	Kitt Peak	Spacewatch	·	2.8 km	MPC · JPL
192785	1999 UK_{30}	—	October 31, 1999	Kitt Peak	Spacewatch	·	2.2 km	MPC · JPL
192786	1999 UW_{30}	—	October 31, 1999	Kitt Peak	Spacewatch	MRX	1.2 km	MPC · JPL
192787	1999 UE_{34}	—	October 31, 1999	Kitt Peak	Spacewatch	HOF	2.5 km	MPC · JPL
192788	1999 UH_{34}	—	October 31, 1999	Kitt Peak	Spacewatch	·	2.6 km	MPC · JPL
192789	1999 UA_{35}	—	October 31, 1999	Kitt Peak	Spacewatch	·	3.2 km	MPC · JPL
192790	1999 UC_{35}	—	October 31, 1999	Kitt Peak	Spacewatch	·	2.0 km	MPC · JPL
192791	1999 UX_{41}	—	October 19, 1999	Kitt Peak	Spacewatch	·	3.6 km	MPC · JPL
192792	1999 UT_{45}	—	October 31, 1999	Catalina	CSS	·	4.5 km	MPC · JPL
192793	1999 UT_{54}	—	October 19, 1999	Kitt Peak	Spacewatch	AGN	1.6 km	MPC · JPL
192794	1999 UY_{54}	—	October 19, 1999	Kitt Peak	Spacewatch	·	2.3 km	MPC · JPL
192795	1999 UX_{55}	—	October 19, 1999	Kitt Peak	Spacewatch	·	1.9 km	MPC · JPL
192796	1999 UR_{56}	—	October 28, 1999	Catalina	CSS	GEF	2.5 km	MPC · JPL
192797	1999 US_{56}	—	October 28, 1999	Catalina	CSS	·	4.9 km	MPC · JPL
192798	1999 UV_{58}	—	October 30, 1999	Kitt Peak	Spacewatch	·	3.0 km	MPC · JPL
192799	1999 VB_{1}	—	November 4, 1999	Powell	Powell	·	2.7 km	MPC · JPL
192800	1999 VZ_{3}	—	November 1, 1999	Catalina	CSS	·	2.5 km	MPC · JPL

== 192801–192900 ==
back to top

Designation			Discovery			Properties		Ref
Permanent	Provisional	Named after	Date	Site	Discoverer(s)	Category	Diam.	Ref
192801	1999 VG_{4}	—	November 1, 1999	Catalina	CSS	MRX	2.0 km	MPC · JPL
192802	1999 VO_{16}	—	November 2, 1999	Kitt Peak	Spacewatch	(13314)	4.0 km	MPC · JPL
192803	1999 VF_{21}	—	November 10, 1999	Višnjan Observatory	K. Korlević	AEO	1.8 km	MPC · JPL
192804	1999 VZ_{31}	—	November 3, 1999	Socorro	LINEAR	·	2.9 km	MPC · JPL
192805	1999 VX_{44}	—	November 4, 1999	Catalina	CSS	·	3.2 km	MPC · JPL
192806	1999 VR_{45}	—	November 4, 1999	Catalina	CSS	·	5.3 km	MPC · JPL
192807	1999 VX_{56}	—	November 4, 1999	Socorro	LINEAR	·	2.6 km	MPC · JPL
192808	1999 VO_{59}	—	November 4, 1999	Socorro	LINEAR	AEO	1.6 km	MPC · JPL
192809	1999 VW_{61}	—	November 4, 1999	Socorro	LINEAR	·	2.5 km	MPC · JPL
192810	1999 VL_{63}	—	November 4, 1999	Socorro	LINEAR	·	3.3 km	MPC · JPL
192811	1999 VC_{68}	—	November 4, 1999	Socorro	LINEAR	·	3.5 km	MPC · JPL
192812	1999 VO_{69}	—	November 4, 1999	Socorro	LINEAR	·	2.2 km	MPC · JPL
192813	1999 VO_{70}	—	November 4, 1999	Socorro	LINEAR	·	4.4 km	MPC · JPL
192814	1999 VG_{71}	—	November 4, 1999	Socorro	LINEAR	·	4.5 km	MPC · JPL
192815	1999 VP_{76}	—	November 5, 1999	Kitt Peak	Spacewatch	·	2.4 km	MPC · JPL
192816	1999 VR_{76}	—	November 5, 1999	Kitt Peak	Spacewatch	·	2.6 km	MPC · JPL
192817	1999 VQ_{79}	—	November 4, 1999	Socorro	LINEAR	·	2.2 km	MPC · JPL
192818	1999 VK_{81}	—	November 4, 1999	Socorro	LINEAR	·	2.7 km	MPC · JPL
192819	1999 VK_{82}	—	November 5, 1999	Socorro	LINEAR	NEM	4.2 km	MPC · JPL
192820	1999 VO_{82}	—	November 5, 1999	Socorro	LINEAR	·	5.1 km	MPC · JPL
192821	1999 VU_{82}	—	November 1, 1999	Kitt Peak	Spacewatch	ADE	4.2 km	MPC · JPL
192822	1999 VP_{88}	—	November 4, 1999	Socorro	LINEAR	AST	4.1 km	MPC · JPL
192823	1999 VD_{89}	—	November 4, 1999	Socorro	LINEAR	GEF	1.9 km	MPC · JPL
192824	1999 VD_{91}	—	November 5, 1999	Socorro	LINEAR	·	3.4 km	MPC · JPL
192825	1999 VT_{91}	—	November 7, 1999	Socorro	LINEAR	·	4.3 km	MPC · JPL
192826	1999 VO_{94}	—	November 9, 1999	Socorro	LINEAR	·	4.6 km	MPC · JPL
192827	1999 VJ_{97}	—	November 9, 1999	Socorro	LINEAR	·	2.8 km	MPC · JPL
192828	1999 VJ_{99}	—	November 9, 1999	Socorro	LINEAR	·	2.8 km	MPC · JPL
192829	1999 VL_{100}	—	November 9, 1999	Socorro	LINEAR	·	2.7 km	MPC · JPL
192830	1999 VU_{101}	—	November 9, 1999	Socorro	LINEAR	·	3.6 km	MPC · JPL
192831	1999 VY_{101}	—	November 9, 1999	Socorro	LINEAR	·	2.7 km	MPC · JPL
192832	1999 VF_{102}	—	November 9, 1999	Socorro	LINEAR	·	2.3 km	MPC · JPL
192833	1999 VP_{107}	—	November 9, 1999	Socorro	LINEAR	·	1.8 km	MPC · JPL
192834	1999 VZ_{117}	—	November 9, 1999	Kitt Peak	Spacewatch	·	3.7 km	MPC · JPL
192835	1999 VB_{118}	—	November 9, 1999	Kitt Peak	Spacewatch	·	3.3 km	MPC · JPL
192836	1999 VC_{121}	—	November 4, 1999	Kitt Peak	Spacewatch	AGN	1.6 km	MPC · JPL
192837	1999 VL_{125}	—	November 6, 1999	Kitt Peak	Spacewatch	·	3.0 km	MPC · JPL
192838	1999 VQ_{130}	—	November 9, 1999	Kitt Peak	Spacewatch	·	2.2 km	MPC · JPL
192839	1999 VK_{132}	—	November 9, 1999	Kitt Peak	Spacewatch	·	2.6 km	MPC · JPL
192840	1999 VN_{137}	—	November 12, 1999	Socorro	LINEAR	AGN	2.1 km	MPC · JPL
192841	1999 VV_{138}	—	November 9, 1999	Kitt Peak	Spacewatch	·	2.8 km	MPC · JPL
192842	1999 VC_{143}	—	November 13, 1999	Kitt Peak	Spacewatch	·	2.4 km	MPC · JPL
192843	1999 VM_{148}	—	November 14, 1999	Socorro	LINEAR	·	3.5 km	MPC · JPL
192844	1999 VD_{152}	—	November 9, 1999	Kitt Peak	Spacewatch	AEO	1.6 km	MPC · JPL
192845	1999 VX_{154}	—	November 13, 1999	Kitt Peak	Spacewatch	MIS	3.9 km	MPC · JPL
192846	1999 VK_{155}	—	November 15, 1999	Kitt Peak	Spacewatch	AGN	1.9 km	MPC · JPL
192847	1999 VK_{156}	—	November 12, 1999	Socorro	LINEAR	(18466)	2.5 km	MPC · JPL
192848	1999 VD_{157}	—	November 12, 1999	Socorro	LINEAR	·	3.8 km	MPC · JPL
192849	1999 VS_{161}	—	November 14, 1999	Socorro	LINEAR	·	2.7 km	MPC · JPL
192850	1999 VH_{166}	—	November 14, 1999	Socorro	LINEAR	·	2.8 km	MPC · JPL
192851	1999 VL_{175}	—	November 10, 1999	Kitt Peak	Spacewatch	·	5.4 km	MPC · JPL
192852	1999 VD_{176}	—	November 2, 1999	Catalina	CSS	BAR	2.2 km	MPC · JPL
192853	1999 VU_{176}	—	November 5, 1999	Socorro	LINEAR	·	3.4 km	MPC · JPL
192854	1999 VA_{178}	—	November 6, 1999	Socorro	LINEAR	BAR	2.1 km	MPC · JPL
192855	1999 VT_{187}	—	November 15, 1999	Socorro	LINEAR	DOR	4.1 km	MPC · JPL
192856	1999 VG_{190}	—	November 15, 1999	Socorro	LINEAR	·	3.6 km	MPC · JPL
192857	1999 VX_{198}	—	November 3, 1999	Catalina	CSS	·	3.8 km	MPC · JPL
192858	1999 VT_{201}	—	November 3, 1999	Socorro	LINEAR	(32418)	3.3 km	MPC · JPL
192859	1999 VB_{213}	—	November 12, 1999	Socorro	LINEAR	KOR	1.6 km	MPC · JPL
192860	1999 VS_{219}	—	November 5, 1999	Kitt Peak	Spacewatch	·	3.0 km	MPC · JPL
192861	1999 VO_{220}	—	November 3, 1999	Socorro	LINEAR	·	2.8 km	MPC · JPL
192862	1999 VE_{223}	—	November 5, 1999	Socorro	LINEAR	·	3.6 km	MPC · JPL
192863	1999 WR_{5}	—	November 29, 1999	Kitt Peak	Spacewatch	·	2.7 km	MPC · JPL
192864	1999 WP_{9}	—	November 30, 1999	Chiyoda	T. Kojima	·	4.6 km	MPC · JPL
192865	1999 WL_{15}	—	November 29, 1999	Kitt Peak	Spacewatch	·	3.3 km	MPC · JPL
192866	1999 WS_{16}	—	November 30, 1999	Kitt Peak	Spacewatch	·	3.4 km	MPC · JPL
192867	1999 WS_{18}	—	November 30, 1999	Kitt Peak	Spacewatch	·	3.0 km	MPC · JPL
192868	1999 WZ_{18}	—	November 30, 1999	Kitt Peak	Spacewatch	KOR	1.6 km	MPC · JPL
192869	1999 XB_{14}	—	December 5, 1999	Socorro	LINEAR	·	2.4 km	MPC · JPL
192870	1999 XE_{19}	—	December 3, 1999	Socorro	LINEAR	·	3.6 km	MPC · JPL
192871	1999 XV_{20}	—	December 5, 1999	Socorro	LINEAR	·	2.5 km	MPC · JPL
192872	1999 XK_{25}	—	December 6, 1999	Socorro	LINEAR	·	4.4 km	MPC · JPL
192873	1999 XJ_{27}	—	December 6, 1999	Socorro	LINEAR	·	4.8 km	MPC · JPL
192874	1999 XN_{30}	—	December 6, 1999	Socorro	LINEAR	GEF ·	4.7 km	MPC · JPL
192875	1999 XF_{39}	—	December 6, 1999	Socorro	LINEAR	AEO	2.1 km	MPC · JPL
192876	1999 XE_{43}	—	December 7, 1999	Socorro	LINEAR	·	3.3 km	MPC · JPL
192877	1999 XP_{46}	—	December 7, 1999	Socorro	LINEAR	AEO	1.8 km	MPC · JPL
192878	1999 XD_{47}	—	December 7, 1999	Socorro	LINEAR	·	2.9 km	MPC · JPL
192879	1999 XX_{52}	—	December 7, 1999	Socorro	LINEAR	·	3.4 km	MPC · JPL
192880	1999 XP_{59}	—	December 7, 1999	Socorro	LINEAR	·	3.7 km	MPC · JPL
192881	1999 XR_{59}	—	December 7, 1999	Socorro	LINEAR	·	3.8 km	MPC · JPL
192882	1999 XT_{61}	—	December 7, 1999	Socorro	LINEAR	MAR	1.8 km	MPC · JPL
192883	1999 XT_{67}	—	December 7, 1999	Socorro	LINEAR	·	3.8 km	MPC · JPL
192884	1999 XJ_{75}	—	December 7, 1999	Socorro	LINEAR	·	4.7 km	MPC · JPL
192885	1999 XA_{94}	—	December 7, 1999	Socorro	LINEAR	·	4.0 km	MPC · JPL
192886	1999 XR_{100}	—	December 7, 1999	Socorro	LINEAR	·	5.6 km	MPC · JPL
192887	1999 XZ_{103}	—	December 3, 1999	Nachi-Katsuura	Y. Shimizu, T. Urata	·	5.4 km	MPC · JPL
192888	1999 XB_{113}	—	December 11, 1999	Socorro	LINEAR	·	3.8 km	MPC · JPL
192889	1999 XA_{115}	—	December 11, 1999	Socorro	LINEAR	·	4.2 km	MPC · JPL
192890	1999 XP_{115}	—	December 5, 1999	Catalina	CSS	·	3.7 km	MPC · JPL
192891	1999 XK_{117}	—	December 5, 1999	Catalina	CSS	·	5.3 km	MPC · JPL
192892	1999 XZ_{118}	—	December 5, 1999	Catalina	CSS	·	3.8 km	MPC · JPL
192893	1999 XM_{122}	—	December 7, 1999	Catalina	CSS	·	3.0 km	MPC · JPL
192894	1999 XU_{130}	—	December 12, 1999	Socorro	LINEAR	·	2.8 km	MPC · JPL
192895	1999 XS_{134}	—	December 5, 1999	Socorro	LINEAR	·	2.8 km	MPC · JPL
192896	1999 XW_{137}	—	December 2, 1999	Kitt Peak	Spacewatch	·	2.8 km	MPC · JPL
192897	1999 XH_{142}	—	December 12, 1999	Socorro	LINEAR	·	7.3 km	MPC · JPL
192898	1999 XB_{145}	—	December 7, 1999	Kitt Peak	Spacewatch	·	3.6 km	MPC · JPL
192899	1999 XE_{146}	—	December 7, 1999	Kitt Peak	Spacewatch	·	3.3 km	MPC · JPL
192900	1999 XN_{151}	—	December 7, 1999	Kitt Peak	Spacewatch	·	2.8 km	MPC · JPL

== 192901–193000 ==
back to top

Designation			Discovery			Properties		Ref
Permanent	Provisional	Named after	Date	Site	Discoverer(s)	Category	Diam.	Ref
192901	1999 XR_{151}	—	December 7, 1999	Kitt Peak	Spacewatch	·	4.2 km	MPC · JPL
192902	1999 XC_{156}	—	December 8, 1999	Socorro	LINEAR	·	3.3 km	MPC · JPL
192903	1999 XX_{177}	—	December 10, 1999	Socorro	LINEAR	·	3.1 km	MPC · JPL
192904	1999 XG_{185}	—	December 12, 1999	Socorro	LINEAR	·	3.8 km	MPC · JPL
192905	1999 XU_{210}	—	December 13, 1999	Socorro	LINEAR	·	4.7 km	MPC · JPL
192906	1999 XJ_{213}	—	December 14, 1999	Socorro	LINEAR	·	4.7 km	MPC · JPL
192907	1999 XU_{213}	—	December 14, 1999	Socorro	LINEAR	·	3.3 km	MPC · JPL
192908	1999 XG_{223}	—	December 13, 1999	Kitt Peak	Spacewatch	AEO	1.3 km	MPC · JPL
192909	1999 XD_{227}	—	December 15, 1999	Kitt Peak	Spacewatch	·	2.8 km	MPC · JPL
192910	1999 XG_{233}	—	December 2, 1999	Anderson Mesa	LONEOS	·	4.4 km	MPC · JPL
192911	1999 XB_{237}	—	December 5, 1999	Kitt Peak	Spacewatch	·	3.1 km	MPC · JPL
192912	1999 XU_{245}	—	December 5, 1999	Socorro	LINEAR	·	2.7 km	MPC · JPL
192913	1999 XC_{247}	—	December 5, 1999	Kitt Peak	Spacewatch	HOF	3.3 km	MPC · JPL
192914	1999 XY_{247}	—	December 6, 1999	Socorro	LINEAR	DOR	4.4 km	MPC · JPL
192915	1999 XD_{251}	—	December 5, 1999	Kitt Peak	Spacewatch	KOR	1.7 km	MPC · JPL
192916	1999 XR_{256}	—	December 7, 1999	Catalina	CSS	·	3.5 km	MPC · JPL
192917	1999 YA_{4}	—	December 19, 1999	Socorro	LINEAR	·	4.8 km	MPC · JPL
192918	1999 YV_{9}	—	December 27, 1999	Kitt Peak	Spacewatch	HOF	4.5 km	MPC · JPL
192919	1999 YH_{10}	—	December 27, 1999	Kitt Peak	Spacewatch	·	2.5 km	MPC · JPL
192920	1999 YT_{10}	—	December 27, 1999	Kitt Peak	Spacewatch	HOF	3.2 km	MPC · JPL
192921	1999 YD_{11}	—	December 27, 1999	Kitt Peak	Spacewatch	·	2.6 km	MPC · JPL
192922	1999 YM_{14}	—	December 30, 1999	Socorro	LINEAR	·	2.7 km	MPC · JPL
192923	1999 YY_{14}	—	December 30, 1999	Monte Agliale	S. Donati	·	3.7 km	MPC · JPL
192924	1999 YU_{20}	—	December 30, 1999	Mauna Kea	Veillet, C.	·	4.0 km	MPC · JPL
192925	1999 YU_{25}	—	December 27, 1999	Kitt Peak	Spacewatch	·	2.6 km	MPC · JPL
192926	2000 AN_{5}	—	January 4, 2000	Višnjan Observatory	K. Korlević	·	3.0 km	MPC · JPL
192927	2000 AH_{6}	—	January 3, 2000	San Marcello	A. Boattini, G. Forti	·	3.8 km	MPC · JPL
192928	2000 AP_{6}	—	January 5, 2000	Kleť	Kleť	·	2.9 km	MPC · JPL
192929	2000 AT_{44}	—	January 5, 2000	Kitt Peak	Spacewatch	L4 · ERY	13 km	MPC · JPL
192930	2000 AV_{52}	—	January 4, 2000	Socorro	LINEAR	JUN	1.7 km	MPC · JPL
192931	2000 AW_{71}	—	January 5, 2000	Socorro	LINEAR	·	5.4 km	MPC · JPL
192932	2000 AO_{92}	—	January 2, 2000	Socorro	LINEAR	·	4.5 km	MPC · JPL
192933	2000 AN_{111}	—	January 5, 2000	Socorro	LINEAR	·	3.3 km	MPC · JPL
192934	2000 AY_{121}	—	January 5, 2000	Socorro	LINEAR	·	6.0 km	MPC · JPL
192935	2000 AZ_{149}	—	January 7, 2000	Socorro	LINEAR	·	3.7 km	MPC · JPL
192936	2000 AV_{153}	—	January 2, 2000	Socorro	LINEAR	·	3.8 km	MPC · JPL
192937	2000 AS_{170}	—	January 7, 2000	Socorro	LINEAR	·	3.2 km	MPC · JPL
192938	2000 AJ_{185}	—	January 7, 2000	Socorro	LINEAR	L4	15 km	MPC · JPL
192939	2000 AK_{188}	—	January 8, 2000	Socorro	LINEAR	·	3.9 km	MPC · JPL
192940	2000 AG_{206}	—	January 3, 2000	Kitt Peak	Spacewatch	HOF	5.0 km	MPC · JPL
192941	2000 AD_{207}	—	January 3, 2000	Kitt Peak	Spacewatch	·	2.7 km	MPC · JPL
192942	2000 AB_{219}	—	January 8, 2000	Kitt Peak	Spacewatch	L4	10 km	MPC · JPL
192943	2000 AJ_{223}	—	January 9, 2000	Kitt Peak	Spacewatch	·	2.0 km	MPC · JPL
192944	2000 AC_{226}	—	January 12, 2000	Kitt Peak	Spacewatch	·	3.5 km	MPC · JPL
192945	2000 AD_{227}	—	January 10, 2000	Kitt Peak	Spacewatch	·	2.7 km	MPC · JPL
192946	2000 AQ_{230}	—	January 3, 2000	Socorro	LINEAR	(40134)	3.3 km	MPC · JPL
192947	2000 AR_{250}	—	January 2, 2000	Kitt Peak	Spacewatch	·	3.7 km	MPC · JPL
192948	2000 BA	—	January 16, 2000	Prescott	P. G. Comba	·	990 m	MPC · JPL
192949	2000 BP_{1}	—	January 27, 2000	Kitt Peak	Spacewatch	·	5.1 km	MPC · JPL
192950	2000 BQ_{2}	—	January 28, 2000	Socorro	LINEAR	·	4.4 km	MPC · JPL
192951	2000 BK_{7}	—	January 29, 2000	Socorro	LINEAR	EOS	3.2 km	MPC · JPL
192952	2000 BZ_{18}	—	January 30, 2000	Socorro	LINEAR	·	1.3 km	MPC · JPL
192953	2000 BJ_{21}	—	January 29, 2000	Kitt Peak	Spacewatch	·	1.0 km	MPC · JPL
192954	2000 BF_{22}	—	January 30, 2000	Kitt Peak	Spacewatch	·	3.2 km	MPC · JPL
192955	2000 BX_{39}	—	January 27, 2000	Kitt Peak	Spacewatch	·	1.0 km	MPC · JPL
192956	2000 CF_{8}	—	February 2, 2000	Socorro	LINEAR	DOR	3.7 km	MPC · JPL
192957	2000 CC_{35}	—	February 2, 2000	Socorro	LINEAR	·	3.2 km	MPC · JPL
192958	2000 CY_{68}	—	February 1, 2000	Kitt Peak	Spacewatch	·	3.7 km	MPC · JPL
192959	2000 CW_{71}	—	February 7, 2000	Kitt Peak	Spacewatch	·	3.3 km	MPC · JPL
192960	2000 CY_{77}	—	February 7, 2000	Kitt Peak	Spacewatch	·	4.0 km	MPC · JPL
192961	2000 CH_{80}	—	February 4, 2000	Socorro	LINEAR	·	1.4 km	MPC · JPL
192962	2000 CF_{101}	—	February 12, 2000	Kitt Peak	Spacewatch	·	2.5 km	MPC · JPL
192963	2000 CO_{110}	—	February 6, 2000	Socorro	LINEAR	·	1.3 km	MPC · JPL
192964	2000 CF_{127}	—	February 2, 2000	Socorro	LINEAR	L4	15 km	MPC · JPL
192965	2000 CP_{129}	—	February 3, 2000	Kitt Peak	Spacewatch	·	1.1 km	MPC · JPL
192966	2000 CS_{140}	—	February 6, 2000	Kitt Peak	Spacewatch	L4	12 km	MPC · JPL
192967	2000 DF_{9}	—	February 26, 2000	Kitt Peak	Spacewatch	·	4.9 km	MPC · JPL
192968	2000 DP_{9}	—	February 26, 2000	Kitt Peak	Spacewatch	EOS	2.2 km	MPC · JPL
192969	2000 DH_{10}	—	February 26, 2000	Kitt Peak	Spacewatch	·	960 m	MPC · JPL
192970	2000 DV_{10}	—	February 26, 2000	Kitt Peak	Spacewatch	·	3.1 km	MPC · JPL
192971	2000 DE_{14}	—	February 28, 2000	Kitt Peak	Spacewatch	HYG	4.4 km	MPC · JPL
192972	2000 DH_{20}	—	February 29, 2000	Socorro	LINEAR	MRX	1.8 km	MPC · JPL
192973	2000 DL_{23}	—	February 29, 2000	Socorro	LINEAR	·	2.9 km	MPC · JPL
192974	2000 DF_{30}	—	February 29, 2000	Socorro	LINEAR	·	990 m	MPC · JPL
192975	2000 DC_{33}	—	February 29, 2000	Socorro	LINEAR	·	3.7 km	MPC · JPL
192976	2000 DB_{37}	—	February 29, 2000	Socorro	LINEAR	·	3.8 km	MPC · JPL
192977	2000 DM_{39}	—	February 29, 2000	Socorro	LINEAR	·	1.4 km	MPC · JPL
192978	2000 DO_{41}	—	February 29, 2000	Socorro	LINEAR	·	3.1 km	MPC · JPL
192979	2000 DG_{50}	—	February 29, 2000	Socorro	LINEAR	EOS	2.9 km	MPC · JPL
192980	2000 DF_{57}	—	February 29, 2000	Socorro	LINEAR	·	2.2 km	MPC · JPL
192981	2000 DK_{57}	—	February 29, 2000	Socorro	LINEAR	·	1.0 km	MPC · JPL
192982	2000 DX_{59}	—	February 29, 2000	Socorro	LINEAR	·	5.5 km	MPC · JPL
192983	2000 DK_{64}	—	February 29, 2000	Socorro	LINEAR	·	2.3 km	MPC · JPL
192984	2000 DM_{64}	—	February 29, 2000	Socorro	LINEAR	·	4.2 km	MPC · JPL
192985	2000 DA_{65}	—	February 29, 2000	Socorro	LINEAR	·	6.3 km	MPC · JPL
192986	2000 DM_{65}	—	February 29, 2000	Socorro	LINEAR	·	4.6 km	MPC · JPL
192987	2000 DD_{67}	—	February 29, 2000	Socorro	LINEAR	·	3.2 km	MPC · JPL
192988	2000 DN_{70}	—	February 29, 2000	Socorro	LINEAR	·	2.9 km	MPC · JPL
192989	2000 DX_{72}	—	February 29, 2000	Socorro	LINEAR	·	3.9 km	MPC · JPL
192990	2000 DK_{75}	—	February 29, 2000	Socorro	LINEAR	TEL	2.2 km	MPC · JPL
192991	2000 DG_{78}	—	February 29, 2000	Socorro	LINEAR	·	1.1 km	MPC · JPL
192992	2000 DR_{87}	—	February 29, 2000	Socorro	LINEAR	·	2.7 km	MPC · JPL
192993	2000 DF_{90}	—	February 27, 2000	Kitt Peak	Spacewatch	KOR	1.6 km	MPC · JPL
192994	2000 DQ_{90}	—	February 27, 2000	Kitt Peak	Spacewatch	EOS	2.3 km	MPC · JPL
192995	2000 DT_{92}	—	February 28, 2000	Kitt Peak	Spacewatch	·	710 m	MPC · JPL
192996	2000 DW_{108}	—	February 29, 2000	Socorro	LINEAR	·	1.2 km	MPC · JPL
192997	2000 DP_{109}	—	February 29, 2000	Socorro	LINEAR	·	1.1 km	MPC · JPL
192998	2000 DJ_{110}	—	February 25, 2000	Uccle	T. Pauwels	·	3.5 km	MPC · JPL
192999	2000 DG_{111}	—	February 29, 2000	Socorro	LINEAR	·	6.1 km	MPC · JPL
193000	2000 DW_{112}	—	February 25, 2000	Kitt Peak	Spacewatch	THM	3.3 km	MPC · JPL

back to top

== See also ==
- Meanings of minor-planet names: 192001–193000
