= Oakley Observatory =

Observatory in Terre Haute, Indiana, United States

- Alternative names: Rose-Hulman Observatory
- Organization: Rose–Hulman Institute of Technology
- Observatory code: 916
- Location: Terre Haute, Indiana, United States
- Coordinates: 39°29′1.5″N 87°18′59″W
- Website: https://www.rose-hulman.edu/academics/learning-and-research-facilities/oakley-observatory/index.html

Minor planets discovered: 4
see § List of discovered minor planets

Oakley Observatory or Rose–Hulman Observatory (observatory code: 916) is an astronomical observatory operated by Rose–Hulman Institute of Technology in Terre Haute, Indiana, United States.

The Oakley Observatory is a teaching observatory with eight permanently mounted telescopes. One of the telescopes is a six-inch refractor built by Clark and Sons in 1886. The other telescopes are all reflecting telescopes ranging in size from eight to twenty two inches. In addition to being used for astronomy classes students use the observatory for research and recreation. Several minor planets have been discovered at Rose-Hulman, most notably numerous discoveries by American astronomer Chris Wolfe (also see Category:Discoveries by Chris Wolfe).

== List of discovered minor planets ==
In addition, the Minor Planet Center credits the discovery of the following minor planets directly to the Oakley observatory:

(61445) 2000 QF_{25}	26 August 2000	list
(139841) 2001 RG_{43}	11 September 2001	list
(193946) 2001 RH_{43}	11 September 2001	list
(247249) 2001 RF_{43}	11 September 2001	list

== See also ==
- List of minor planet discoverers § Oakley
- List of observatories
