= Henry Throop =

American astronomer and planetary scientist

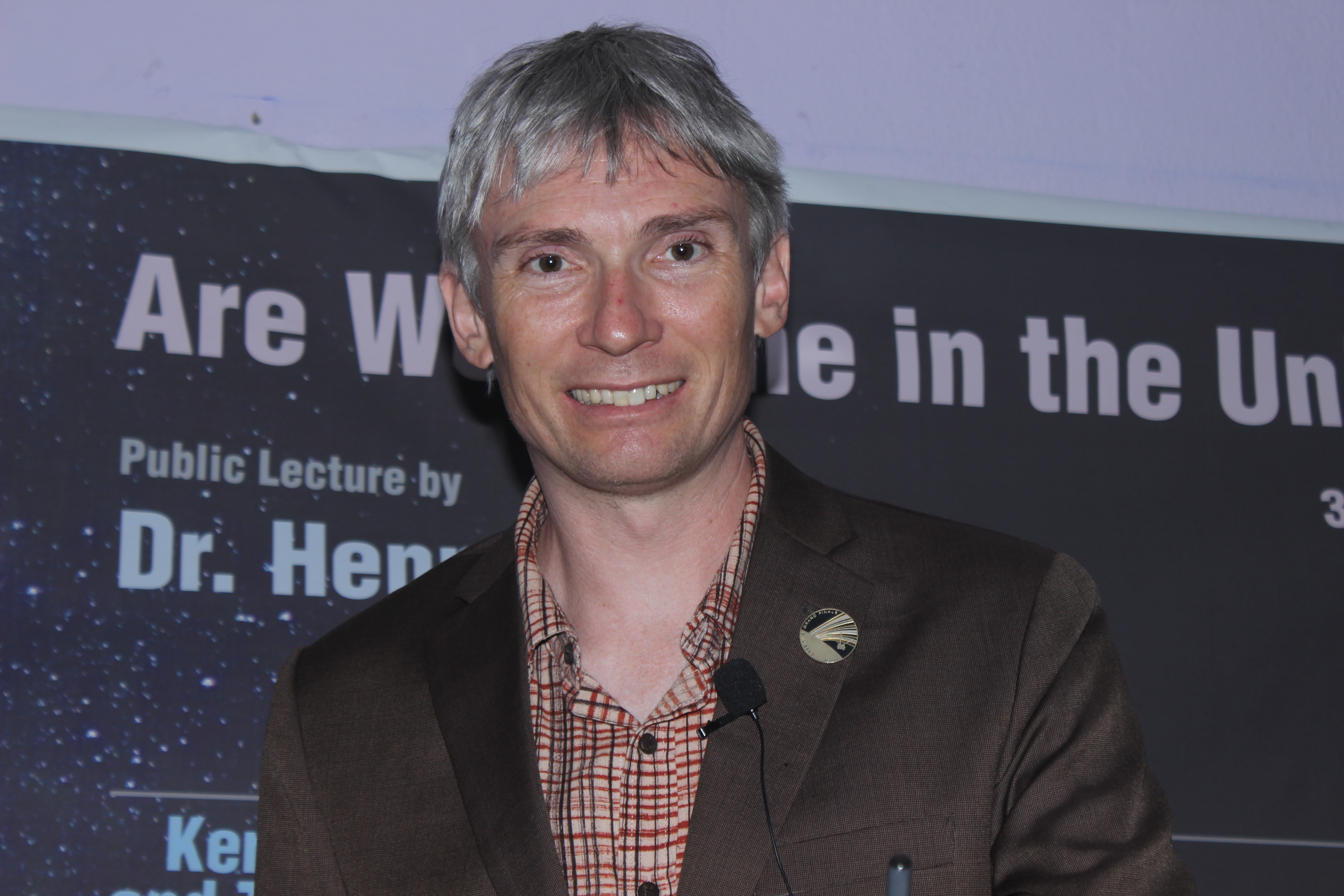
Throop at Kerala State Science and Technology Museum(KSSTM), Thiruvananthapuram India

Henry B. Throop (born 1972), is an American astronomer and planetary scientist who specializes in the dynamics of rings and dust in the outer solar system. Throop is a member of the science team for NASA's New Horizons mission to Pluto and the Kuiper Belt, and has been involved with NASA missions throughout the Solar System. Throop lives in Washington, DC where he runs NASA's science programs in the outer Solar System. He has done extensive education and outreach around the world, having spent nearly a decade as an astronomer living in South Africa, India, and Mexico. The asteroid 193736 Henrythroop is named after him.

== Professional History ==
Throop had his BA from Grinnell College, 1994 and he received a PhD in Planetary Science from the University of Colorado, USA, in 2000. Then he left the University of Colorado and moved to Southwest Research Institute (SWRI), Boulder as a Senior Research Scientist during 2000–2008. There he worked on Cassini rings observations at Jupiter (December 2000) and Saturn (July 2004). From October 2003 he has been working as a member of the Spacecraft Hazard Team on the New Horizons mission to Pluto.

He is a frequent consultant to NASA and the National Science Foundation. While working at NASA, he managed two of NASA's major scientific research programs.

In August 2007 the History Channel had put a documentary in which Throop and others discuss Pluto and New Horizons. The show was called "Outer Planets" and is part of their series "The Universe." Show first aired in August 2007, and had been seen in re-runs during 2008.

He moved to the Astronomy department of the National Autonomous University of Mexico in Mexico City as a senior research scientist during 2008–2009. During February 2013 he moved to Pretoria, South Africa. He was a faculty at the University of Pretoria, where he was working to start up their astronomy program. While living in Africa, he worked extensively with rural schools, helping to develop their science programs and inspire the next generation of leaders. At the same time, he was affiliated with the Planetary Science Institute in Tucson, Arizona, USA and also continued to work on New Horizons and other projects at SWRI.

Throop lived in Mumbai, India from 2015 through 2018, where continued to work with PSI and SWRI, and taught astronomy at St. Xavier's College, Mumbai.

He has presented more than 150 lectures for science festivals, planetariums, school groups, and public events across the US, Mexico, Africa, and India. Dr. Throop's work has been featured in Science, Nature, Time, The Washington Post, on the National Geographic TV.

=== Research interests ===
- Planetary Rings
- Protoplanetary Disks
- Dust in the Solar System
- Formation of Organic Molecules
- Early History of the Solar System
- Formation of Extrasolar Planets
- New Horizons mission to Pluto

== Achievements ==
He worked at NASA HQ as the program officer for two programs: Cassini Data Analysis and Participating Scientists (CDAPS), and Origins of Solar Systems (OSS). He was involved in its historic flyby of Pluto on July 14, 2015, working with the visible-IR spectrometer (Ralph) team.

He has also been involved with the Cassini mission's imaging team in the data acquisition and analysis of ring studies in particular.

He is responsible for writing award-winning software for operations planning – a Solar System simulator used for planning observations. It was issued by New Horizons, Cassini, Rosetta, Lunar Recon Orbiter, MESSENGER, and many other missions. A web-based observing planning tool for seeing what the sky looks like from a spacecraft or the Earth. The software has won the 'IDL Applications of the Year' award, from RSI.

== Awards and honors ==
Asteroid 193736 Henrythroop, discovered by Marc Buie at the Kitt Peak National Observatory in 2001, was named after him. The official naming citation was published by the Minor Planet Center on 11 July 2018 (M.P.C. 110637).

Throop was awarded the American Foreign Service Association's Avis Bohlen Award in 2017, for his efforts to bring astronomy to rural schools in Africa and India.

Throop was awarded the Carl Sagan Medal for Excellence in Public Communication in Planetary Science by the American Astronomical Society's Division for Planetary Science in 2017, for Throop's work communicating science to the public. Throop's citation states:

Also receiving the Carl Sagan Medal is Henry B. Throop (Planetary Science Institute) for his efforts to kindle interest in worlds beyond Earth throughout the developing world. Throop’s presentations in South Africa, India, Sri Lanka, Namibia, Botswana, Nepal, and Mexico reach audiences who might otherwise not be exposed to planetary science. He closely collaborates with teachers and works with a diverse group of students and the public to stimulate their curiosity and show them how they can explore the world around them. With his engaging personality and genuine interest in interacting with students and teachers in far-flung places, Throop presents a positive face for science using planetary exploration as a driver.
