= List of minor planets: 193001–194000 =

The following is a partial list of minor planets, running from minor-planet number 193001 through 194000, inclusive. The primary data for this and other partial lists is based on JPL's "Small-Body Orbital Elements" and data available from the Minor Planet Center. Critical list information is also provided by the MPC, unless otherwise specified from Lowell Observatory. A detailed description of the table's columns and additional sources are given on the main page including a complete list of every page in this series, and a statistical break-up on the dynamical classification of minor planets.

Also see the summary list of all named bodies in numerical and alphabetical order, and the corresponding naming citations for the number range of this particular list. New namings may only be added to this list after official publication, as the preannouncement of names is condemned by the Working Group for Small Bodies Nomenclature of the International Astronomical Union.

Near-Earth obj.	MBA (inner)	MBA (outer)	Centaur
Mars-crosser	MBA (middle)	Jupiter trojan	Trans-Neptunian obj.
Unclassified

== 193001–193100 ==
Designation			Discovery			Properties		Ref
Permanent	Provisional	Named after	Date	Site	Discoverer(s)	Category	Diam.	Ref
193001	2000 DZ_{114}	—	February 27, 2000	Kitt Peak	Spacewatch	·	2.7 km	MPC · JPL
193002	2000 DZ_{116}	—	February 25, 2000	Kitt Peak	Spacewatch	·	4.8 km	MPC · JPL
193003	2000 EO_{2}	—	March 3, 2000	Socorro	LINEAR	·	3.2 km	MPC · JPL
193004	2000 EJ_{5}	—	March 2, 2000	Kitt Peak	Spacewatch	·	4.2 km	MPC · JPL
193005	2000 ER_{5}	—	March 2, 2000	Kitt Peak	Spacewatch	·	2.5 km	MPC · JPL
193006	2000 ES_{9}	—	March 3, 2000	Socorro	LINEAR	·	1.3 km	MPC · JPL
193007	2000 ER_{11}	—	March 4, 2000	Socorro	LINEAR	·	6.8 km	MPC · JPL
193008	2000 EH_{16}	—	March 3, 2000	Socorro	LINEAR	·	1.1 km	MPC · JPL
193009	2000 EA_{18}	—	March 4, 2000	Socorro	LINEAR	·	3.6 km	MPC · JPL
193010	2000 EJ_{18}	—	March 4, 2000	Socorro	LINEAR	GEF	2.1 km	MPC · JPL
193011	2000 EO_{19}	—	March 5, 2000	Socorro	LINEAR	TIR ·	6.3 km	MPC · JPL
193012	2000 EV_{25}	—	March 8, 2000	Kitt Peak	Spacewatch	·	4.2 km	MPC · JPL
193013	2000 EP_{26}	—	March 8, 2000	Socorro	LINEAR	PHO	2.0 km	MPC · JPL
193014	2000 EC_{33}	—	March 5, 2000	Socorro	LINEAR	·	3.6 km	MPC · JPL
193015	2000 EN_{37}	—	March 8, 2000	Socorro	LINEAR	·	4.2 km	MPC · JPL
193016	2000 EQ_{38}	—	March 8, 2000	Socorro	LINEAR	THB	6.5 km	MPC · JPL
193017	2000 EF_{42}	—	March 8, 2000	Socorro	LINEAR	·	5.1 km	MPC · JPL
193018	2000 EV_{42}	—	March 8, 2000	Socorro	LINEAR	·	7.1 km	MPC · JPL
193019	2000 EX_{42}	—	March 8, 2000	Socorro	LINEAR	·	1.4 km	MPC · JPL
193020	2000 EE_{51}	—	March 3, 2000	Kitt Peak	Spacewatch	(43176)	4.6 km	MPC · JPL
193021	2000 EU_{52}	—	March 3, 2000	Kitt Peak	Spacewatch	·	1.3 km	MPC · JPL
193022	2000 EA_{57}	—	March 8, 2000	Socorro	LINEAR	·	5.5 km	MPC · JPL
193023	2000 ET_{57}	—	March 8, 2000	Socorro	LINEAR	·	5.1 km	MPC · JPL
193024	2000 ET_{60}	—	March 10, 2000	Socorro	LINEAR	·	1.5 km	MPC · JPL
193025	2000 EQ_{61}	—	March 10, 2000	Socorro	LINEAR	·	3.5 km	MPC · JPL
193026	2000 EJ_{66}	—	March 10, 2000	Socorro	LINEAR	·	4.7 km	MPC · JPL
193027	2000 EX_{67}	—	March 10, 2000	Socorro	LINEAR	·	3.4 km	MPC · JPL
193028	2000 EX_{70}	—	March 10, 2000	Catalina	CSS	·	3.9 km	MPC · JPL
193029	2000 EB_{74}	—	March 10, 2000	Kitt Peak	Spacewatch	·	3.7 km	MPC · JPL
193030	2000 EU_{74}	—	March 11, 2000	Kitt Peak	Spacewatch	THM	3.4 km	MPC · JPL
193031	2000 EV_{76}	—	March 5, 2000	Socorro	LINEAR	·	1.4 km	MPC · JPL
193032	2000 ED_{80}	—	March 5, 2000	Socorro	LINEAR	·	1.8 km	MPC · JPL
193033	2000 EV_{91}	—	March 9, 2000	Socorro	LINEAR	·	5.2 km	MPC · JPL
193034	2000 ED_{115}	—	March 10, 2000	Kitt Peak	Spacewatch	·	1.3 km	MPC · JPL
193035	2000 EH_{127}	—	March 11, 2000	Anderson Mesa	LONEOS	·	3.1 km	MPC · JPL
193036	2000 EP_{127}	—	March 11, 2000	Anderson Mesa	LONEOS	·	1.4 km	MPC · JPL
193037	2000 ET_{128}	—	March 11, 2000	Anderson Mesa	LONEOS	·	4.6 km	MPC · JPL
193038	2000 ER_{130}	—	March 11, 2000	Anderson Mesa	LONEOS	·	1.3 km	MPC · JPL
193039	2000 ES_{133}	—	March 11, 2000	Anderson Mesa	LONEOS	EOS	3.3 km	MPC · JPL
193040	2000 EC_{160}	—	March 3, 2000	Socorro	LINEAR	·	4.4 km	MPC · JPL
193041	2000 ER_{160}	—	March 3, 2000	Socorro	LINEAR	·	4.2 km	MPC · JPL
193042	2000 EO_{162}	—	March 3, 2000	Socorro	LINEAR	·	1.8 km	MPC · JPL
193043	2000 EF_{174}	—	March 4, 2000	Socorro	LINEAR	·	5.6 km	MPC · JPL
193044	2000 FL_{2}	—	March 25, 2000	Kitt Peak	Spacewatch	·	860 m	MPC · JPL
193045	2000 FE_{6}	—	March 25, 2000	Kitt Peak	Spacewatch	·	1.2 km	MPC · JPL
193046	2000 FS_{8}	—	March 29, 2000	Kitt Peak	Spacewatch	·	3.8 km	MPC · JPL
193047	2000 FW_{11}	—	March 28, 2000	Socorro	LINEAR	·	8.3 km	MPC · JPL
193048	2000 FW_{14}	—	March 29, 2000	Socorro	LINEAR	PHO	2.3 km	MPC · JPL
193049	2000 FJ_{27}	—	March 27, 2000	Anderson Mesa	LONEOS	·	4.8 km	MPC · JPL
193050	2000 FS_{28}	—	March 27, 2000	Anderson Mesa	LONEOS	·	5.4 km	MPC · JPL
193051	2000 FB_{29}	—	March 27, 2000	Anderson Mesa	LONEOS	·	1.2 km	MPC · JPL
193052	2000 FE_{33}	—	March 29, 2000	Socorro	LINEAR	V	1.0 km	MPC · JPL
193053	2000 FE_{39}	—	March 29, 2000	Socorro	LINEAR	·	1.6 km	MPC · JPL
193054	2000 FR_{43}	—	March 29, 2000	Socorro	LINEAR	·	6.7 km	MPC · JPL
193055	2000 FJ_{45}	—	March 29, 2000	Socorro	LINEAR	ERI	3.3 km	MPC · JPL
193056	2000 FY_{50}	—	March 29, 2000	Kitt Peak	Spacewatch	NYS	1.4 km	MPC · JPL
193057	2000 FR_{51}	—	March 29, 2000	Kitt Peak	Spacewatch	MAS	970 m	MPC · JPL
193058	2000 FE_{64}	—	March 29, 2000	Socorro	LINEAR	·	7.8 km	MPC · JPL
193059	2000 FS_{66}	—	March 25, 2000	Kitt Peak	Spacewatch	·	5.3 km	MPC · JPL
193060	2000 GL	—	April 2, 2000	Prescott	P. G. Comba	·	2.2 km	MPC · JPL
193061	2000 GP	—	April 1, 2000	Kitt Peak	Spacewatch	·	3.4 km	MPC · JPL
193062	2000 GJ_{5}	—	April 4, 2000	Socorro	LINEAR	·	3.0 km	MPC · JPL
193063	2000 GF_{7}	—	April 4, 2000	Socorro	LINEAR	·	4.7 km	MPC · JPL
193064	2000 GD_{9}	—	April 5, 2000	Socorro	LINEAR	·	1.0 km	MPC · JPL
193065	2000 GB_{12}	—	April 5, 2000	Socorro	LINEAR	HYG	5.0 km	MPC · JPL
193066	2000 GW_{13}	—	April 5, 2000	Socorro	LINEAR	EOS	2.7 km	MPC · JPL
193067	2000 GZ_{13}	—	April 5, 2000	Socorro	LINEAR	THM	4.0 km	MPC · JPL
193068	2000 GE_{15}	—	April 5, 2000	Socorro	LINEAR	·	1.4 km	MPC · JPL
193069	2000 GS_{17}	—	April 5, 2000	Socorro	LINEAR	MAS	1.1 km	MPC · JPL
193070	2000 GB_{21}	—	April 5, 2000	Socorro	LINEAR	·	970 m	MPC · JPL
193071	2000 GJ_{23}	—	April 5, 2000	Socorro	LINEAR	·	4.4 km	MPC · JPL
193072	2000 GF_{24}	—	April 5, 2000	Socorro	LINEAR	NYS	1.2 km	MPC · JPL
193073	2000 GN_{25}	—	April 5, 2000	Socorro	LINEAR	·	1.2 km	MPC · JPL
193074	2000 GF_{26}	—	April 5, 2000	Socorro	LINEAR	·	6.4 km	MPC · JPL
193075	2000 GX_{29}	—	April 5, 2000	Socorro	LINEAR	·	1.4 km	MPC · JPL
193076	2000 GT_{30}	—	April 5, 2000	Socorro	LINEAR	THM	3.4 km	MPC · JPL
193077	2000 GV_{30}	—	April 5, 2000	Socorro	LINEAR	·	860 m	MPC · JPL
193078	2000 GB_{31}	—	April 5, 2000	Socorro	LINEAR	·	1.1 km	MPC · JPL
193079	2000 GD_{34}	—	April 5, 2000	Socorro	LINEAR	·	3.6 km	MPC · JPL
193080	2000 GW_{36}	—	April 5, 2000	Socorro	LINEAR	·	4.7 km	MPC · JPL
193081	2000 GZ_{36}	—	April 5, 2000	Socorro	LINEAR	·	720 m	MPC · JPL
193082	2000 GS_{37}	—	April 5, 2000	Socorro	LINEAR	MAS	1.0 km	MPC · JPL
193083	2000 GD_{44}	—	April 5, 2000	Socorro	LINEAR	·	1.9 km	MPC · JPL
193084	2000 GA_{53}	—	April 5, 2000	Socorro	LINEAR	·	1.7 km	MPC · JPL
193085	2000 GO_{63}	—	April 5, 2000	Socorro	LINEAR	·	3.4 km	MPC · JPL
193086	2000 GP_{64}	—	April 5, 2000	Socorro	LINEAR	·	2.0 km	MPC · JPL
193087	2000 GW_{73}	—	April 5, 2000	Socorro	LINEAR	·	6.3 km	MPC · JPL
193088	2000 GV_{74}	—	April 5, 2000	Socorro	LINEAR	·	5.5 km	MPC · JPL
193089	2000 GE_{76}	—	April 5, 2000	Socorro	LINEAR	·	6.2 km	MPC · JPL
193090	2000 GF_{80}	—	April 6, 2000	Socorro	LINEAR	(2076)	1.0 km	MPC · JPL
193091	2000 GP_{80}	—	April 6, 2000	Socorro	LINEAR	·	4.5 km	MPC · JPL
193092	2000 GN_{99}	—	April 7, 2000	Socorro	LINEAR	·	1.7 km	MPC · JPL
193093	2000 GJ_{103}	—	April 7, 2000	Socorro	LINEAR	·	4.6 km	MPC · JPL
193094	2000 GT_{110}	—	April 2, 2000	Anderson Mesa	LONEOS	·	1.3 km	MPC · JPL
193095	2000 GB_{112}	—	April 3, 2000	Anderson Mesa	LONEOS	·	1.4 km	MPC · JPL
193096	2000 GD_{113}	—	April 5, 2000	Socorro	LINEAR	·	1.0 km	MPC · JPL
193097	2000 GE_{115}	—	April 8, 2000	Socorro	LINEAR	·	2.5 km	MPC · JPL
193098	2000 GM_{118}	—	April 3, 2000	Kitt Peak	Spacewatch	·	3.2 km	MPC · JPL
193099	2000 GW_{119}	—	April 5, 2000	Kitt Peak	Spacewatch	·	990 m	MPC · JPL
193100	2000 GN_{121}	—	April 6, 2000	Kitt Peak	Spacewatch	·	870 m	MPC · JPL

== 193101–193200 ==
back to top

Designation			Discovery			Properties		Ref
Permanent	Provisional	Named after	Date	Site	Discoverer(s)	Category	Diam.	Ref
193101	2000 GQ_{121}	—	April 6, 2000	Kitt Peak	Spacewatch	·	870 m	MPC · JPL
193102	2000 GT_{121}	—	April 6, 2000	Kitt Peak	Spacewatch	·	3.8 km	MPC · JPL
193103	2000 GD_{123}	—	April 11, 2000	Prescott	P. G. Comba	·	1.5 km	MPC · JPL
193104	2000 GL_{128}	—	April 5, 2000	Kitt Peak	Spacewatch	·	1.1 km	MPC · JPL
193105	2000 GD_{131}	—	April 7, 2000	Kitt Peak	Spacewatch	·	1.4 km	MPC · JPL
193106	2000 GT_{132}	—	April 8, 2000	Socorro	LINEAR	·	2.5 km	MPC · JPL
193107	2000 GE_{135}	—	April 8, 2000	Socorro	LINEAR	·	6.1 km	MPC · JPL
193108	2000 GB_{138}	—	April 4, 2000	Anderson Mesa	LONEOS	·	6.1 km	MPC · JPL
193109	2000 GP_{151}	—	April 5, 2000	Socorro	LINEAR	·	5.1 km	MPC · JPL
193110	2000 GZ_{151}	—	April 6, 2000	Socorro	LINEAR	·	4.5 km	MPC · JPL
193111	2000 GC_{153}	—	April 6, 2000	Anderson Mesa	LONEOS	·	1.3 km	MPC · JPL
193112	2000 GU_{155}	—	April 6, 2000	Anderson Mesa	LONEOS	URS	5.5 km	MPC · JPL
193113	2000 GF_{159}	—	April 7, 2000	Socorro	LINEAR	EUP	7.9 km	MPC · JPL
193114	2000 GE_{166}	—	April 5, 2000	Socorro	LINEAR	·	4.4 km	MPC · JPL
193115	2000 GY_{170}	—	April 5, 2000	Anderson Mesa	LONEOS	·	1.1 km	MPC · JPL
193116	2000 GG_{174}	—	April 5, 2000	Anderson Mesa	LONEOS	·	6.2 km	MPC · JPL
193117	2000 GX_{174}	—	April 3, 2000	Kitt Peak	Spacewatch	THM	4.7 km	MPC · JPL
193118	2000 HJ	—	April 24, 2000	Kitt Peak	Spacewatch	·	4.2 km	MPC · JPL
193119	2000 HT	—	April 24, 2000	Kitt Peak	Spacewatch	·	1.1 km	MPC · JPL
193120	2000 HE_{4}	—	April 26, 2000	Kitt Peak	Spacewatch	V	800 m	MPC · JPL
193121	2000 HG_{7}	—	April 28, 2000	Kitt Peak	Spacewatch	·	5.9 km	MPC · JPL
193122	2000 HT_{9}	—	April 27, 2000	Socorro	LINEAR	·	4.6 km	MPC · JPL
193123	2000 HC_{11}	—	April 27, 2000	Socorro	LINEAR	·	1.1 km	MPC · JPL
193124	2000 HK_{22}	—	April 29, 2000	Socorro	LINEAR	·	800 m	MPC · JPL
193125	2000 HL_{25}	—	April 24, 2000	Anderson Mesa	LONEOS	·	1.2 km	MPC · JPL
193126	2000 HN_{25}	—	April 24, 2000	Anderson Mesa	LONEOS	·	1.8 km	MPC · JPL
193127	2000 HQ_{25}	—	April 24, 2000	Anderson Mesa	LONEOS	·	960 m	MPC · JPL
193128	2000 HU_{25}	—	April 24, 2000	Anderson Mesa	LONEOS	·	4.2 km	MPC · JPL
193129	2000 HM_{28}	—	April 29, 2000	Socorro	LINEAR	·	970 m	MPC · JPL
193130	2000 HQ_{43}	—	April 29, 2000	Kitt Peak	Spacewatch	MAS	780 m	MPC · JPL
193131	2000 HZ_{44}	—	April 26, 2000	Anderson Mesa	LONEOS	·	1.2 km	MPC · JPL
193132	2000 HY_{47}	—	April 29, 2000	Socorro	LINEAR	HYG	4.1 km	MPC · JPL
193133	2000 HA_{50}	—	April 29, 2000	Socorro	LINEAR	·	1.7 km	MPC · JPL
193134	2000 HY_{56}	—	April 24, 2000	Anderson Mesa	LONEOS	·	3.0 km	MPC · JPL
193135	2000 HV_{59}	—	April 25, 2000	Anderson Mesa	LONEOS	·	950 m	MPC · JPL
193136	2000 HB_{62}	—	April 25, 2000	Kitt Peak	Spacewatch	·	5.2 km	MPC · JPL
193137	2000 HC_{62}	—	April 25, 2000	Kitt Peak	Spacewatch	·	1.2 km	MPC · JPL
193138	2000 HE_{62}	—	April 25, 2000	Kitt Peak	Spacewatch	·	1.2 km	MPC · JPL
193139	2000 HR_{63}	—	April 26, 2000	Anderson Mesa	LONEOS	MAS	960 m	MPC · JPL
193140	2000 HQ_{67}	—	April 27, 2000	Anderson Mesa	LONEOS	EOS	3.4 km	MPC · JPL
193141	2000 HT_{68}	—	April 28, 2000	Kitt Peak	Spacewatch	THM	4.5 km	MPC · JPL
193142	2000 HK_{72}	—	April 26, 2000	Anderson Mesa	LONEOS	·	960 m	MPC · JPL
193143	2000 HV_{81}	—	April 29, 2000	Socorro	LINEAR	NYS	1.3 km	MPC · JPL
193144	2000 HR_{89}	—	April 29, 2000	Socorro	LINEAR	·	1.9 km	MPC · JPL
193145	2000 HN_{90}	—	April 29, 2000	Socorro	LINEAR	HYG	3.8 km	MPC · JPL
193146	2000 HV_{97}	—	April 26, 2000	Anderson Mesa	LONEOS	·	1.1 km	MPC · JPL
193147	2000 HZ_{99}	—	April 27, 2000	Anderson Mesa	LONEOS	·	1.8 km	MPC · JPL
193148	2000 JX_{3}	—	May 4, 2000	Socorro	LINEAR	PHO	1.5 km	MPC · JPL
193149	2000 JY_{4}	—	May 3, 2000	Kitt Peak	Spacewatch	·	2.1 km	MPC · JPL
193150	2000 JU_{8}	—	May 7, 2000	Prescott	P. G. Comba	NYS	1.4 km	MPC · JPL
193151	2000 JU_{21}	—	May 6, 2000	Socorro	LINEAR	(2076)	1.0 km	MPC · JPL
193152	2000 JS_{22}	—	May 7, 2000	Socorro	LINEAR	·	1.7 km	MPC · JPL
193153	2000 JU_{25}	—	May 7, 2000	Socorro	LINEAR	·	3.7 km	MPC · JPL
193154	2000 JP_{43}	—	May 7, 2000	Socorro	LINEAR	·	4.5 km	MPC · JPL
193155	2000 JZ_{44}	—	May 7, 2000	Socorro	LINEAR	·	1.5 km	MPC · JPL
193156	2000 JD_{64}	—	May 10, 2000	Socorro	LINEAR	·	1.6 km	MPC · JPL
193157	2000 JT_{82}	—	May 7, 2000	Socorro	LINEAR	·	1.5 km	MPC · JPL
193158 Haechan	2000 KJ_{4}	Haechan	May 28, 2000	Bohyunsan	Kim, S.-L.	·	4.6 km	MPC · JPL
193159	2000 KL_{7}	—	May 27, 2000	Socorro	LINEAR	·	1.2 km	MPC · JPL
193160	2000 KR_{8}	—	May 28, 2000	Socorro	LINEAR	NYS	1.8 km	MPC · JPL
193161	2000 KS_{8}	—	May 28, 2000	Socorro	LINEAR	(2076)	1.1 km	MPC · JPL
193162	2000 KU_{8}	—	May 28, 2000	Socorro	LINEAR	THM	5.0 km	MPC · JPL
193163	2000 KS_{9}	—	May 28, 2000	Socorro	LINEAR	·	4.4 km	MPC · JPL
193164	2000 KT_{9}	—	May 28, 2000	Socorro	LINEAR	·	5.7 km	MPC · JPL
193165	2000 KZ_{9}	—	May 28, 2000	Socorro	LINEAR	·	1.4 km	MPC · JPL
193166	2000 KM_{29}	—	May 28, 2000	Socorro	LINEAR	·	1.8 km	MPC · JPL
193167	2000 KK_{41}	—	May 31, 2000	Prescott	P. G. Comba	MAS	1.3 km	MPC · JPL
193168	2000 KU_{42}	—	May 25, 2000	Kitt Peak	Spacewatch	V	910 m	MPC · JPL
193169	2000 KN_{49}	—	May 30, 2000	Kitt Peak	Spacewatch	(1298)	6.4 km	MPC · JPL
193170	2000 KT_{49}	—	May 30, 2000	Kitt Peak	Spacewatch	·	4.1 km	MPC · JPL
193171	2000 KT_{51}	—	May 31, 2000	Kitt Peak	Spacewatch	·	4.4 km	MPC · JPL
193172	2000 LN_{8}	—	June 7, 2000	Prescott	P. G. Comba	·	1.6 km	MPC · JPL
193173	2000 LE_{9}	—	June 5, 2000	Socorro	LINEAR	·	1.6 km	MPC · JPL
193174	2000 LF_{22}	—	June 6, 2000	Kitt Peak	Spacewatch	·	4.7 km	MPC · JPL
193175	2000 OV_{7}	—	July 30, 2000	Socorro	LINEAR	·	3.2 km	MPC · JPL
193176	2000 OV_{10}	—	July 23, 2000	Socorro	LINEAR	·	2.6 km	MPC · JPL
193177	2000 OX_{18}	—	July 23, 2000	Socorro	LINEAR	·	5.9 km	MPC · JPL
193178	2000 PK_{5}	—	August 4, 2000	Socorro	LINEAR	APO +1km	1 km	MPC · JPL
193179	2000 PP_{14}	—	August 1, 2000	Socorro	LINEAR	NYS ·	3.3 km	MPC · JPL
193180	2000 PU_{25}	—	August 4, 2000	Socorro	LINEAR	H	800 m	MPC · JPL
193181	2000 PK_{28}	—	August 4, 2000	Haleakala	NEAT	·	2.7 km	MPC · JPL
193182	2000 QR	—	August 22, 2000	Drebach	G. Lehmann	NYS	1.6 km	MPC · JPL
193183	2000 QE_{16}	—	August 24, 2000	Socorro	LINEAR	NYS	1.4 km	MPC · JPL
193184	2000 QV_{37}	—	August 24, 2000	Socorro	LINEAR	NYS	1.3 km	MPC · JPL
193185	2000 QN_{42}	—	August 24, 2000	Socorro	LINEAR	PHO	3.2 km	MPC · JPL
193186	2000 QY_{45}	—	August 24, 2000	Socorro	LINEAR	·	1.7 km	MPC · JPL
193187	2000 QZ_{51}	—	August 24, 2000	Socorro	LINEAR	MAS	940 m	MPC · JPL
193188	2000 QQ_{56}	—	August 26, 2000	Socorro	LINEAR	·	1.4 km	MPC · JPL
193189	2000 QS_{56}	—	August 26, 2000	Socorro	LINEAR	NYS	1.5 km	MPC · JPL
193190	2000 QY_{59}	—	August 26, 2000	Socorro	LINEAR	MAS	1.1 km	MPC · JPL
193191	2000 QT_{85}	—	August 25, 2000	Socorro	LINEAR	·	1.8 km	MPC · JPL
193192	2000 QS_{93}	—	August 26, 2000	Socorro	LINEAR	·	2.1 km	MPC · JPL
193193	2000 QD_{112}	—	August 24, 2000	Socorro	LINEAR	·	1.3 km	MPC · JPL
193194	2000 QH_{118}	—	August 25, 2000	Socorro	LINEAR	·	1.7 km	MPC · JPL
193195	2000 QP_{124}	—	August 29, 2000	Socorro	LINEAR	·	2.3 km	MPC · JPL
193196	2000 QS_{125}	—	August 31, 2000	Socorro	LINEAR	·	2.1 km	MPC · JPL
193197	2000 QQ_{129}	—	August 30, 2000	Višnjan Observatory	K. Korlević	·	1.9 km	MPC · JPL
193198	2000 QT_{137}	—	August 31, 2000	Socorro	LINEAR	·	1.3 km	MPC · JPL
193199	2000 QL_{139}	—	August 31, 2000	Socorro	LINEAR	·	2.1 km	MPC · JPL
193200	2000 QZ_{146}	—	August 31, 2000	Socorro	LINEAR	·	2.0 km	MPC · JPL

== 193201–193300 ==
back to top

Designation			Discovery			Properties		Ref
Permanent	Provisional	Named after	Date	Site	Discoverer(s)	Category	Diam.	Ref
193201	2000 QR_{147}	—	August 31, 2000	Socorro	LINEAR	H	850 m	MPC · JPL
193202	2000 QE_{155}	—	August 31, 2000	Socorro	LINEAR	·	2.0 km	MPC · JPL
193203	2000 QF_{159}	—	August 31, 2000	Socorro	LINEAR	·	2.0 km	MPC · JPL
193204	2000 QE_{172}	—	August 31, 2000	Socorro	LINEAR	·	1.2 km	MPC · JPL
193205	2000 QC_{192}	—	August 26, 2000	Socorro	LINEAR	·	2.5 km	MPC · JPL
193206	2000 QL_{194}	—	August 31, 2000	Socorro	LINEAR	·	1.4 km	MPC · JPL
193207	2000 QU_{197}	—	August 29, 2000	Socorro	LINEAR	·	1.9 km	MPC · JPL
193208	2000 QJ_{204}	—	August 29, 2000	Socorro	LINEAR	·	3.6 km	MPC · JPL
193209	2000 QC_{206}	—	August 31, 2000	Socorro	LINEAR	·	2.1 km	MPC · JPL
193210	2000 QZ_{208}	—	August 31, 2000	Socorro	LINEAR	NYS	2.3 km	MPC · JPL
193211	2000 QC_{212}	—	August 31, 2000	Socorro	LINEAR	MAS	1.1 km	MPC · JPL
193212	2000 QE_{224}	—	August 26, 2000	Socorro	LINEAR	·	3.1 km	MPC · JPL
193213	2000 QZ_{226}	—	August 31, 2000	Socorro	LINEAR	V	1.3 km	MPC · JPL
193214	2000 QB_{230}	—	August 31, 2000	Socorro	LINEAR	·	1.6 km	MPC · JPL
193215	2000 QG_{232}	—	August 31, 2000	Bergisch Gladbach	W. Bickel	·	1.8 km	MPC · JPL
193216	2000 RC	—	September 1, 2000	Socorro	LINEAR	H	890 m	MPC · JPL
193217	2000 RM_{8}	—	September 1, 2000	Socorro	LINEAR	H	950 m	MPC · JPL
193218	2000 RP_{25}	—	September 1, 2000	Socorro	LINEAR	·	2.2 km	MPC · JPL
193219	2000 RG_{29}	—	September 1, 2000	Socorro	LINEAR	·	3.0 km	MPC · JPL
193220	2000 RP_{30}	—	September 1, 2000	Socorro	LINEAR	·	1.9 km	MPC · JPL
193221	2000 RZ_{34}	—	September 1, 2000	Socorro	LINEAR	·	1.8 km	MPC · JPL
193222	2000 RS_{36}	—	September 2, 2000	Socorro	LINEAR	H	760 m	MPC · JPL
193223	2000 RJ_{44}	—	September 3, 2000	Socorro	LINEAR	·	1.5 km	MPC · JPL
193224	2000 RK_{45}	—	September 3, 2000	Socorro	LINEAR	·	1.3 km	MPC · JPL
193225	2000 RG_{47}	—	September 3, 2000	Socorro	LINEAR	·	3.8 km	MPC · JPL
193226	2000 RM_{49}	—	September 5, 2000	Socorro	LINEAR	·	2.7 km	MPC · JPL
193227	2000 RP_{53}	—	September 7, 2000	Kitt Peak	Spacewatch	H	870 m	MPC · JPL
193228	2000 RZ_{57}	—	September 7, 2000	Kitt Peak	Spacewatch	·	2.1 km	MPC · JPL
193229	2000 RF_{80}	—	September 1, 2000	Socorro	LINEAR	·	2.3 km	MPC · JPL
193230	2000 RO_{82}	—	September 1, 2000	Socorro	LINEAR	·	2.0 km	MPC · JPL
193231	2000 RU_{83}	—	September 1, 2000	Socorro	LINEAR	·	2.6 km	MPC · JPL
193232	2000 RB_{91}	—	September 3, 2000	Socorro	LINEAR	·	1.6 km	MPC · JPL
193233	2000 RE_{103}	—	September 5, 2000	Anderson Mesa	LONEOS	·	2.5 km	MPC · JPL
193234	2000 SY	—	September 17, 2000	Socorro	LINEAR	·	5.9 km	MPC · JPL
193235	2000 SE_{2}	—	September 20, 2000	Socorro	LINEAR	·	2.6 km	MPC · JPL
193236	2000 SY_{7}	—	September 22, 2000	Kitt Peak	Spacewatch	·	1.6 km	MPC · JPL
193237	2000 SB_{9}	—	September 23, 2000	Socorro	LINEAR	H	890 m	MPC · JPL
193238	2000 ST_{21}	—	September 24, 2000	Socorro	LINEAR	H	680 m	MPC · JPL
193239	2000 SB_{22}	—	September 24, 2000	Socorro	LINEAR	H	1.2 km	MPC · JPL
193240	2000 SC_{24}	—	September 24, 2000	Socorro	LINEAR	H	840 m	MPC · JPL
193241	2000 ST_{33}	—	September 24, 2000	Socorro	LINEAR	T_{j} (2.98) · 3:2	7.7 km	MPC · JPL
193242	2000 SC_{35}	—	September 24, 2000	Socorro	LINEAR	·	1.6 km	MPC · JPL
193243	2000 SS_{42}	—	September 28, 2000	Socorro	LINEAR	H	1.0 km	MPC · JPL
193244	2000 SP_{45}	—	September 22, 2000	Socorro	LINEAR	PHO	1.7 km	MPC · JPL
193245	2000 SZ_{51}	—	September 23, 2000	Socorro	LINEAR	EUN	1.2 km	MPC · JPL
193246	2000 SS_{59}	—	September 24, 2000	Socorro	LINEAR	·	1.6 km	MPC · JPL
193247	2000 SC_{62}	—	September 24, 2000	Socorro	LINEAR	·	2.0 km	MPC · JPL
193248	2000 SA_{75}	—	September 24, 2000	Socorro	LINEAR	T_{j} (2.97) · HIL · 3:2	9.6 km	MPC · JPL
193249	2000 SJ_{75}	—	September 24, 2000	Socorro	LINEAR	·	1.9 km	MPC · JPL
193250	2000 SV_{76}	—	September 24, 2000	Socorro	LINEAR	·	1.8 km	MPC · JPL
193251	2000 SF_{77}	—	September 24, 2000	Socorro	LINEAR	(5)	2.2 km	MPC · JPL
193252	2000 SZ_{77}	—	September 24, 2000	Socorro	LINEAR	·	1.6 km	MPC · JPL
193253	2000 SW_{78}	—	September 24, 2000	Socorro	LINEAR	NYS	1.5 km	MPC · JPL
193254	2000 SV_{79}	—	September 24, 2000	Socorro	LINEAR	·	1.8 km	MPC · JPL
193255	2000 SR_{85}	—	September 24, 2000	Socorro	LINEAR	·	2.5 km	MPC · JPL
193256	2000 SG_{104}	—	September 24, 2000	Socorro	LINEAR	·	2.0 km	MPC · JPL
193257	2000 SK_{106}	—	September 24, 2000	Socorro	LINEAR	·	1.7 km	MPC · JPL
193258	2000 SC_{120}	—	September 24, 2000	Socorro	LINEAR	·	1.7 km	MPC · JPL
193259	2000 SP_{120}	—	September 24, 2000	Socorro	LINEAR	·	2.4 km	MPC · JPL
193260	2000 SK_{123}	—	September 24, 2000	Socorro	LINEAR	(5)	2.3 km	MPC · JPL
193261	2000 SZ_{150}	—	September 24, 2000	Socorro	LINEAR	·	1.2 km	MPC · JPL
193262	2000 ST_{151}	—	September 24, 2000	Socorro	LINEAR	·	2.6 km	MPC · JPL
193263	2000 SJ_{155}	—	September 24, 2000	Socorro	LINEAR	·	2.5 km	MPC · JPL
193264	2000 SQ_{155}	—	September 24, 2000	Socorro	LINEAR	·	2.2 km	MPC · JPL
193265	2000 SH_{159}	—	September 27, 2000	Kitt Peak	Spacewatch	·	1.3 km	MPC · JPL
193266	2000 SN_{163}	—	September 30, 2000	Ondřejov	P. Kušnirák, P. Pravec	NYS	1.9 km	MPC · JPL
193267	2000 SY_{171}	—	September 27, 2000	Socorro	LINEAR	·	2.7 km	MPC · JPL
193268	2000 SQ_{174}	—	September 28, 2000	Socorro	LINEAR	T_{j} (2.98) · 3:2	8.5 km	MPC · JPL
193269	2000 SK_{180}	—	September 28, 2000	Socorro	LINEAR	EUN	2.1 km	MPC · JPL
193270	2000 SL_{183}	—	September 20, 2000	Haleakala	NEAT	·	1.3 km	MPC · JPL
193271	2000 SC_{184}	—	September 20, 2000	Kitt Peak	Spacewatch	·	2.0 km	MPC · JPL
193272	2000 SM_{188}	—	September 21, 2000	Haleakala	NEAT	·	1.5 km	MPC · JPL
193273	2000 ST_{190}	—	September 23, 2000	Kitt Peak	Spacewatch	·	2.4 km	MPC · JPL
193274	2000 SV_{192}	—	September 24, 2000	Socorro	LINEAR	·	1.7 km	MPC · JPL
193275	2000 SR_{204}	—	September 24, 2000	Socorro	LINEAR	NYS	1.5 km	MPC · JPL
193276	2000 SY_{204}	—	September 24, 2000	Socorro	LINEAR	·	2.3 km	MPC · JPL
193277	2000 SZ_{209}	—	September 25, 2000	Socorro	LINEAR	·	3.2 km	MPC · JPL
193278	2000 SL_{212}	—	September 25, 2000	Socorro	LINEAR	·	2.8 km	MPC · JPL
193279	2000 SV_{212}	—	September 25, 2000	Socorro	LINEAR	V	1.3 km	MPC · JPL
193280	2000 SH_{213}	—	September 25, 2000	Socorro	LINEAR	·	1.7 km	MPC · JPL
193281	2000 SD_{214}	—	September 26, 2000	Socorro	LINEAR	·	2.8 km	MPC · JPL
193282	2000 SU_{215}	—	September 26, 2000	Socorro	LINEAR	·	3.7 km	MPC · JPL
193283	2000 SP_{220}	—	September 26, 2000	Socorro	LINEAR	·	2.7 km	MPC · JPL
193284	2000 SU_{226}	—	September 27, 2000	Socorro	LINEAR	·	2.5 km	MPC · JPL
193285	2000 SC_{227}	—	September 27, 2000	Socorro	LINEAR	PHO	2.1 km	MPC · JPL
193286	2000 SX_{231}	—	September 24, 2000	Socorro	LINEAR	·	2.4 km	MPC · JPL
193287	2000 SY_{231}	—	September 24, 2000	Socorro	LINEAR	H	920 m	MPC · JPL
193288	2000 SD_{232}	—	September 26, 2000	Socorro	LINEAR	H	850 m	MPC · JPL
193289	2000 SL_{232}	—	September 27, 2000	Socorro	LINEAR	·	4.8 km	MPC · JPL
193290	2000 SO_{232}	—	September 28, 2000	Socorro	LINEAR	H	750 m	MPC · JPL
193291	2000 SU_{236}	—	September 24, 2000	Socorro	LINEAR	T_{j} (2.95) · HIL	7.7 km	MPC · JPL
193292	2000 SL_{238}	—	September 26, 2000	Socorro	LINEAR	·	2.0 km	MPC · JPL
193293	2000 SO_{239}	—	September 27, 2000	Socorro	LINEAR	3:2 · SHU	8.7 km	MPC · JPL
193294	2000 SO_{240}	—	September 26, 2000	Socorro	LINEAR	H	1.3 km	MPC · JPL
193295	2000 SK_{242}	—	September 24, 2000	Socorro	LINEAR	·	1.4 km	MPC · JPL
193296	2000 SR_{245}	—	September 24, 2000	Socorro	LINEAR	·	1.2 km	MPC · JPL
193297	2000 SF_{249}	—	September 24, 2000	Socorro	LINEAR	MAS	1.1 km	MPC · JPL
193298	2000 SG_{264}	—	September 26, 2000	Socorro	LINEAR	V	970 m	MPC · JPL
193299	2000 SB_{273}	—	September 28, 2000	Socorro	LINEAR	·	2.0 km	MPC · JPL
193300	2000 SO_{275}	—	September 28, 2000	Socorro	LINEAR	·	2.9 km	MPC · JPL

== 193301–193400 ==
back to top

Designation			Discovery			Properties		Ref
Permanent	Provisional	Named after	Date	Site	Discoverer(s)	Category	Diam.	Ref
193301	2000 SN_{276}	—	September 30, 2000	Socorro	LINEAR	·	2.3 km	MPC · JPL
193302	2000 SU_{277}	—	September 30, 2000	Socorro	LINEAR	·	1.6 km	MPC · JPL
193303	2000 SF_{278}	—	September 30, 2000	Socorro	LINEAR	·	2.6 km	MPC · JPL
193304	2000 SQ_{279}	—	September 25, 2000	Socorro	LINEAR	·	2.1 km	MPC · JPL
193305	2000 SS_{281}	—	September 23, 2000	Socorro	LINEAR	·	2.1 km	MPC · JPL
193306	2000 SD_{285}	—	September 23, 2000	Socorro	LINEAR	T_{j} (2.93) · 3:2	11 km	MPC · JPL
193307	2000 SZ_{294}	—	September 27, 2000	Socorro	LINEAR	·	2.8 km	MPC · JPL
193308	2000 SG_{300}	—	September 28, 2000	Socorro	LINEAR	·	1.8 km	MPC · JPL
193309	2000 SP_{303}	—	September 28, 2000	Socorro	LINEAR	·	2.4 km	MPC · JPL
193310	2000 SR_{303}	—	September 28, 2000	Socorro	LINEAR	·	2.2 km	MPC · JPL
193311	2000 SY_{304}	—	September 30, 2000	Socorro	LINEAR	HIL · 3:2	8.1 km	MPC · JPL
193312	2000 SK_{305}	—	September 30, 2000	Socorro	LINEAR	·	3.6 km	MPC · JPL
193313	2000 SR_{308}	—	September 30, 2000	Socorro	LINEAR	slow	2.8 km	MPC · JPL
193314	2000 SK_{309}	—	September 30, 2000	Socorro	LINEAR	(5)	2.0 km	MPC · JPL
193315	2000 SQ_{317}	—	September 30, 2000	Socorro	LINEAR	·	2.2 km	MPC · JPL
193316	2000 SW_{317}	—	September 30, 2000	Socorro	LINEAR	PHO	1.6 km	MPC · JPL
193317	2000 SS_{322}	—	September 28, 2000	Socorro	LINEAR	·	2.2 km	MPC · JPL
193318	2000 SV_{322}	—	September 28, 2000	Socorro	LINEAR	CYB	7.2 km	MPC · JPL
193319	2000 SA_{325}	—	September 28, 2000	Kitt Peak	Spacewatch	·	1.7 km	MPC · JPL
193320	2000 SE_{328}	—	September 30, 2000	Socorro	LINEAR	·	2.2 km	MPC · JPL
193321	2000 SN_{334}	—	September 26, 2000	Kitt Peak	Spacewatch	·	2.4 km	MPC · JPL
193322	2000 SM_{366}	—	September 23, 2000	Anderson Mesa	LONEOS	·	1.8 km	MPC · JPL
193323	2000 SS_{367}	—	September 23, 2000	Socorro	LINEAR	T_{j} (2.99) · HIL · 3:2	8.3 km	MPC · JPL
193324	2000 ST_{376}	—	September 25, 2000	Anderson Mesa	LONEOS	·	2.3 km	MPC · JPL
193325	2000 TE_{3}	—	October 1, 2000	Socorro	LINEAR	NYS	1.4 km	MPC · JPL
193326	2000 TA_{10}	—	October 1, 2000	Socorro	LINEAR	·	1.9 km	MPC · JPL
193327	2000 TO_{11}	—	October 1, 2000	Socorro	LINEAR	·	1.7 km	MPC · JPL
193328	2000 TW_{14}	—	October 1, 2000	Socorro	LINEAR	(5)	2.2 km	MPC · JPL
193329	2000 TZ_{21}	—	October 2, 2000	Socorro	LINEAR	·	2.2 km	MPC · JPL
193330	2000 TM_{26}	—	October 2, 2000	Socorro	LINEAR	(5)	1.5 km	MPC · JPL
193331	2000 TN_{29}	—	October 3, 2000	Socorro	LINEAR	·	1.8 km	MPC · JPL
193332	2000 TP_{35}	—	October 6, 2000	Anderson Mesa	LONEOS	3:2	6.3 km	MPC · JPL
193333	2000 TS_{36}	—	October 6, 2000	Anderson Mesa	LONEOS	·	1.5 km	MPC · JPL
193334	2000 TL_{49}	—	October 1, 2000	Anderson Mesa	LONEOS	·	1.5 km	MPC · JPL
193335	2000 TB_{65}	—	October 1, 2000	Socorro	LINEAR	·	1.6 km	MPC · JPL
193336	2000 TB_{67}	—	October 2, 2000	Socorro	LINEAR	·	1.4 km	MPC · JPL
193337	2000 TZ_{67}	—	October 3, 2000	Socorro	LINEAR	·	1.9 km	MPC · JPL
193338	2000 UR_{4}	—	October 24, 2000	Socorro	LINEAR	·	2.2 km	MPC · JPL
193339	2000 UO_{5}	—	October 24, 2000	Socorro	LINEAR	·	2.8 km	MPC · JPL
193340	2000 UU_{5}	—	October 19, 2000	Kitt Peak	Spacewatch	·	2.4 km	MPC · JPL
193341	2000 UE_{7}	—	October 24, 2000	Socorro	LINEAR	·	2.0 km	MPC · JPL
193342	2000 UG_{7}	—	October 24, 2000	Socorro	LINEAR	·	1.7 km	MPC · JPL
193343	2000 UZ_{11}	—	October 18, 2000	Socorro	LINEAR	·	2.0 km	MPC · JPL
193344	2000 UX_{14}	—	October 25, 2000	Socorro	LINEAR	·	3.1 km	MPC · JPL
193345	2000 UC_{17}	—	October 24, 2000	Socorro	LINEAR	·	1.4 km	MPC · JPL
193346	2000 UD_{18}	—	October 24, 2000	Socorro	LINEAR	·	1.5 km	MPC · JPL
193347	2000 UL_{19}	—	October 24, 2000	Socorro	LINEAR	·	4.3 km	MPC · JPL
193348	2000 US_{21}	—	October 24, 2000	Socorro	LINEAR	·	2.4 km	MPC · JPL
193349	2000 UU_{22}	—	October 24, 2000	Socorro	LINEAR	·	4.7 km	MPC · JPL
193350	2000 US_{24}	—	October 24, 2000	Socorro	LINEAR	T_{j} (2.97) · 3:2	8.1 km	MPC · JPL
193351	2000 UF_{29}	—	October 31, 2000	Socorro	LINEAR	·	2.3 km	MPC · JPL
193352	2000 UL_{30}	—	October 31, 2000	Socorro	LINEAR	H	860 m	MPC · JPL
193353	2000 UU_{32}	—	October 29, 2000	Kitt Peak	Spacewatch	·	2.1 km	MPC · JPL
193354	2000 UX_{34}	—	October 24, 2000	Socorro	LINEAR	3:2	8.5 km	MPC · JPL
193355	2000 UO_{42}	—	October 24, 2000	Socorro	LINEAR	·	2.0 km	MPC · JPL
193356	2000 UB_{43}	—	October 24, 2000	Socorro	LINEAR	MAS	1.3 km	MPC · JPL
193357	2000 UM_{45}	—	October 24, 2000	Socorro	LINEAR	·	2.2 km	MPC · JPL
193358	2000 UN_{46}	—	October 24, 2000	Socorro	LINEAR	(5)	2.1 km	MPC · JPL
193359	2000 UQ_{49}	—	October 24, 2000	Socorro	LINEAR	·	2.1 km	MPC · JPL
193360	2000 UB_{50}	—	October 24, 2000	Socorro	LINEAR	·	1.7 km	MPC · JPL
193361	2000 UC_{52}	—	October 24, 2000	Socorro	LINEAR	NYS	2.4 km	MPC · JPL
193362	2000 UT_{59}	—	October 25, 2000	Socorro	LINEAR	·	3.5 km	MPC · JPL
193363	2000 UL_{62}	—	October 25, 2000	Socorro	LINEAR	·	1.6 km	MPC · JPL
193364	2000 UC_{63}	—	October 25, 2000	Socorro	LINEAR	·	1.7 km	MPC · JPL
193365	2000 UV_{65}	—	October 25, 2000	Socorro	LINEAR	·	2.0 km	MPC · JPL
193366	2000 UJ_{67}	—	October 25, 2000	Socorro	LINEAR	·	1.9 km	MPC · JPL
193367	2000 UC_{71}	—	October 25, 2000	Socorro	LINEAR	·	2.2 km	MPC · JPL
193368	2000 UL_{71}	—	October 25, 2000	Socorro	LINEAR	(5)	1.9 km	MPC · JPL
193369	2000 UH_{73}	—	October 25, 2000	Socorro	LINEAR	·	2.1 km	MPC · JPL
193370	2000 UH_{83}	—	October 30, 2000	Socorro	LINEAR	·	2.0 km	MPC · JPL
193371	2000 UM_{88}	—	October 31, 2000	Socorro	LINEAR	·	5.5 km	MPC · JPL
193372	2000 UV_{98}	—	October 25, 2000	Socorro	LINEAR	·	2.8 km	MPC · JPL
193373	2000 UF_{105}	—	October 29, 2000	Socorro	LINEAR	·	1.9 km	MPC · JPL
193374	2000 UT_{107}	—	October 30, 2000	Socorro	LINEAR	·	2.5 km	MPC · JPL
193375	2000 UB_{108}	—	October 30, 2000	Socorro	LINEAR	·	2.1 km	MPC · JPL
193376	2000 UP_{109}	—	October 31, 2000	Socorro	LINEAR	·	2.1 km	MPC · JPL
193377	2000 VD_{1}	—	November 1, 2000	Kitt Peak	Spacewatch	·	1.9 km	MPC · JPL
193378	2000 VY_{16}	—	November 1, 2000	Socorro	LINEAR	MAR	2.5 km	MPC · JPL
193379	2000 VP_{19}	—	November 1, 2000	Socorro	LINEAR	(5)	2.1 km	MPC · JPL
193380	2000 VY_{23}	—	November 1, 2000	Socorro	LINEAR	·	1.8 km	MPC · JPL
193381	2000 VK_{24}	—	November 1, 2000	Socorro	LINEAR	fast	2.1 km	MPC · JPL
193382	2000 VO_{24}	—	November 1, 2000	Socorro	LINEAR	·	4.8 km	MPC · JPL
193383	2000 VT_{27}	—	November 1, 2000	Socorro	LINEAR	(5)	2.5 km	MPC · JPL
193384	2000 VW_{28}	—	November 1, 2000	Socorro	LINEAR	·	2.3 km	MPC · JPL
193385	2000 VC_{30}	—	November 1, 2000	Socorro	LINEAR	·	2.2 km	MPC · JPL
193386	2000 VV_{30}	—	November 1, 2000	Socorro	LINEAR	PHO	1.6 km	MPC · JPL
193387	2000 VD_{35}	—	November 1, 2000	Socorro	LINEAR	JUN	1.7 km	MPC · JPL
193388	2000 VM_{35}	—	November 1, 2000	Socorro	LINEAR	·	2.3 km	MPC · JPL
193389	2000 VV_{44}	—	November 2, 2000	Socorro	LINEAR	H	900 m	MPC · JPL
193390	2000 VX_{44}	—	November 3, 2000	Socorro	LINEAR	·	7.4 km	MPC · JPL
193391	2000 VQ_{45}	—	November 2, 2000	Socorro	LINEAR	·	4.3 km	MPC · JPL
193392	2000 VA_{54}	—	November 3, 2000	Socorro	LINEAR	·	2.1 km	MPC · JPL
193393	2000 VX_{61}	—	November 9, 2000	Socorro	LINEAR	H	950 m	MPC · JPL
193394	2000 WX_{1}	—	November 17, 2000	Kitt Peak	Spacewatch	·	2.4 km	MPC · JPL
193395	2000 WU_{6}	—	November 19, 2000	Socorro	LINEAR	·	1.5 km	MPC · JPL
193396	2000 WH_{8}	—	November 20, 2000	Socorro	LINEAR	(5)	3.9 km	MPC · JPL
193397	2000 WQ_{9}	—	November 22, 2000	Bohyunsan	Bohyunsan	(5)	1.8 km	MPC · JPL
193398	2000 WY_{13}	—	November 20, 2000	Socorro	LINEAR	T_{j} (2.97) · 3:2	7.7 km	MPC · JPL
193399	2000 WG_{15}	—	November 20, 2000	Socorro	LINEAR	·	3.2 km	MPC · JPL
193400	2000 WC_{18}	—	November 21, 2000	Socorro	LINEAR	·	2.0 km	MPC · JPL

== 193401–193500 ==
back to top

Designation			Discovery			Properties		Ref
Permanent	Provisional	Named after	Date	Site	Discoverer(s)	Category	Diam.	Ref
193401	2000 WA_{20}	—	November 23, 2000	Kitt Peak	Spacewatch	·	2.3 km	MPC · JPL
193402	2000 WK_{25}	—	November 21, 2000	Socorro	LINEAR	·	1.7 km	MPC · JPL
193403	2000 WK_{29}	—	November 21, 2000	Socorro	LINEAR	H	820 m	MPC · JPL
193404	2000 WS_{29}	—	November 25, 2000	Socorro	LINEAR	H	1.1 km	MPC · JPL
193405	2000 WW_{30}	—	November 20, 2000	Socorro	LINEAR	·	2.2 km	MPC · JPL
193406	2000 WL_{36}	—	November 20, 2000	Socorro	LINEAR	·	2.4 km	MPC · JPL
193407	2000 WT_{37}	—	November 20, 2000	Socorro	LINEAR	·	3.1 km	MPC · JPL
193408	2000 WB_{38}	—	November 20, 2000	Socorro	LINEAR	(5)	1.8 km	MPC · JPL
193409	2000 WF_{38}	—	November 20, 2000	Socorro	LINEAR	·	2.2 km	MPC · JPL
193410	2000 WS_{50}	—	November 26, 2000	Socorro	LINEAR	EUN	2.4 km	MPC · JPL
193411	2000 WR_{53}	—	November 27, 2000	Kitt Peak	Spacewatch	·	1.6 km	MPC · JPL
193412	2000 WV_{59}	—	November 21, 2000	Socorro	LINEAR	·	4.7 km	MPC · JPL
193413	2000 WH_{61}	—	November 21, 2000	Socorro	LINEAR	·	5.0 km	MPC · JPL
193414	2000 WQ_{65}	—	November 28, 2000	Kitt Peak	Spacewatch	·	2.4 km	MPC · JPL
193415	2000 WB_{67}	—	November 26, 2000	Socorro	LINEAR	H	700 m	MPC · JPL
193416	2000 WZ_{67}	—	November 29, 2000	Kitt Peak	Kitt Peak	·	2.0 km	MPC · JPL
193417	2000 WJ_{69}	—	November 19, 2000	Socorro	LINEAR	·	2.2 km	MPC · JPL
193418	2000 WY_{69}	—	November 19, 2000	Socorro	LINEAR	·	3.1 km	MPC · JPL
193419	2000 WG_{85}	—	November 20, 2000	Socorro	LINEAR	·	2.4 km	MPC · JPL
193420	2000 WX_{87}	—	November 20, 2000	Socorro	LINEAR	·	3.3 km	MPC · JPL
193421	2000 WD_{88}	—	November 20, 2000	Socorro	LINEAR	·	3.3 km	MPC · JPL
193422	2000 WT_{88}	—	November 20, 2000	Socorro	LINEAR	·	5.7 km	MPC · JPL
193423	2000 WS_{92}	—	November 21, 2000	Socorro	LINEAR	·	1.5 km	MPC · JPL
193424	2000 WZ_{92}	—	November 21, 2000	Socorro	LINEAR	NYS	2.3 km	MPC · JPL
193425	2000 WA_{93}	—	November 21, 2000	Socorro	LINEAR	·	2.9 km	MPC · JPL
193426	2000 WL_{93}	—	November 21, 2000	Socorro	LINEAR	·	2.2 km	MPC · JPL
193427	2000 WB_{97}	—	November 21, 2000	Socorro	LINEAR	(5)	2.4 km	MPC · JPL
193428	2000 WE_{101}	—	November 21, 2000	Socorro	LINEAR	·	3.2 km	MPC · JPL
193429	2000 WJ_{102}	—	November 26, 2000	Socorro	LINEAR	·	2.3 km	MPC · JPL
193430	2000 WP_{108}	—	November 20, 2000	Socorro	LINEAR	·	2.4 km	MPC · JPL
193431	2000 WX_{108}	—	November 20, 2000	Socorro	LINEAR	RAF	1.7 km	MPC · JPL
193432	2000 WA_{111}	—	November 20, 2000	Socorro	LINEAR	·	1.8 km	MPC · JPL
193433	2000 WE_{113}	—	November 20, 2000	Socorro	LINEAR	·	2.2 km	MPC · JPL
193434	2000 WZ_{115}	—	November 20, 2000	Socorro	LINEAR	(5) · fast	2.2 km	MPC · JPL
193435	2000 WO_{116}	—	November 20, 2000	Socorro	LINEAR	·	2.7 km	MPC · JPL
193436	2000 WB_{117}	—	November 20, 2000	Socorro	LINEAR	·	2.9 km	MPC · JPL
193437	2000 WK_{120}	—	November 20, 2000	Socorro	LINEAR	(5)	2.6 km	MPC · JPL
193438	2000 WF_{123}	—	November 29, 2000	Socorro	LINEAR	·	2.5 km	MPC · JPL
193439	2000 WS_{124}	—	November 29, 2000	Socorro	LINEAR	H	980 m	MPC · JPL
193440	2000 WR_{126}	—	November 16, 2000	Kitt Peak	Spacewatch	·	2.3 km	MPC · JPL
193441	2000 WO_{127}	—	November 17, 2000	Kitt Peak	Spacewatch	·	2.2 km	MPC · JPL
193442	2000 WC_{129}	—	November 19, 2000	Kitt Peak	Spacewatch	(5)	2.2 km	MPC · JPL
193443	2000 WC_{131}	—	November 20, 2000	Anderson Mesa	LONEOS	·	1.9 km	MPC · JPL
193444	2000 WL_{135}	—	November 19, 2000	Socorro	LINEAR	·	3.2 km	MPC · JPL
193445	2000 WJ_{136}	—	November 20, 2000	Socorro	LINEAR	·	2.0 km	MPC · JPL
193446	2000 WR_{139}	—	November 21, 2000	Socorro	LINEAR	·	2.2 km	MPC · JPL
193447	2000 WS_{140}	—	November 21, 2000	Socorro	LINEAR	(5)	2.0 km	MPC · JPL
193448	2000 WG_{143}	—	November 20, 2000	Anderson Mesa	LONEOS	·	2.4 km	MPC · JPL
193449	2000 WW_{146}	—	November 28, 2000	Haleakala	NEAT	T_{j} (2.9)	9.1 km	MPC · JPL
193450	2000 WQ_{151}	—	November 29, 2000	Višnjan Observatory	K. Korlević	·	2.1 km	MPC · JPL
193451	2000 WB_{158}	—	November 30, 2000	Socorro	LINEAR	·	5.0 km	MPC · JPL
193452	2000 WO_{168}	—	November 25, 2000	Anderson Mesa	LONEOS	·	2.7 km	MPC · JPL
193453	2000 WV_{169}	—	November 24, 2000	Anderson Mesa	LONEOS	MAR	2.5 km	MPC · JPL
193454	2000 WX_{174}	—	November 26, 2000	Socorro	LINEAR	·	2.1 km	MPC · JPL
193455	2000 WH_{181}	—	November 30, 2000	Anderson Mesa	LONEOS	·	2.6 km	MPC · JPL
193456	2000 XZ_{1}	—	December 1, 2000	Socorro	LINEAR	H	970 m	MPC · JPL
193457	2000 XJ_{2}	—	December 1, 2000	Bohyunsan	Bohyunsan	·	1.3 km	MPC · JPL
193458	2000 XQ_{4}	—	December 1, 2000	Socorro	LINEAR	·	1.7 km	MPC · JPL
193459	2000 XK_{5}	—	December 1, 2000	Socorro	LINEAR	MAR	2.0 km	MPC · JPL
193460	2000 XE_{6}	—	December 1, 2000	Socorro	LINEAR	·	1.2 km	MPC · JPL
193461	2000 XZ_{6}	—	December 1, 2000	Socorro	LINEAR	·	1.5 km	MPC · JPL
193462	2000 XE_{7}	—	December 1, 2000	Socorro	LINEAR	·	2.6 km	MPC · JPL
193463	2000 XF_{10}	—	December 1, 2000	Socorro	LINEAR	EUN	2.7 km	MPC · JPL
193464	2000 XH_{12}	—	December 4, 2000	Socorro	LINEAR	·	4.1 km	MPC · JPL
193465	2000 XJ_{13}	—	December 4, 2000	Socorro	LINEAR	·	4.0 km	MPC · JPL
193466	2000 XA_{16}	—	December 1, 2000	Socorro	LINEAR	·	2.6 km	MPC · JPL
193467	2000 XK_{17}	—	December 1, 2000	Socorro	LINEAR	·	2.4 km	MPC · JPL
193468	2000 XL_{17}	—	December 1, 2000	Socorro	LINEAR	·	2.0 km	MPC · JPL
193469	2000 XL_{18}	—	December 4, 2000	Socorro	LINEAR	EUN	3.0 km	MPC · JPL
193470	2000 XU_{19}	—	December 4, 2000	Socorro	LINEAR	EUN	2.4 km	MPC · JPL
193471	2000 XR_{20}	—	December 4, 2000	Socorro	LINEAR	·	2.7 km	MPC · JPL
193472	2000 XH_{22}	—	December 4, 2000	Socorro	LINEAR	·	2.7 km	MPC · JPL
193473	2000 XV_{24}	—	December 4, 2000	Socorro	LINEAR	EUN	2.4 km	MPC · JPL
193474	2000 XH_{25}	—	December 4, 2000	Socorro	LINEAR	·	2.7 km	MPC · JPL
193475	2000 XO_{27}	—	December 4, 2000	Socorro	LINEAR	·	5.2 km	MPC · JPL
193476	2000 XR_{31}	—	December 4, 2000	Socorro	LINEAR	·	3.5 km	MPC · JPL
193477	2000 XO_{36}	—	December 5, 2000	Socorro	LINEAR	·	2.2 km	MPC · JPL
193478	2000 XN_{37}	—	December 5, 2000	Socorro	LINEAR	·	4.4 km	MPC · JPL
193479	2000 XG_{41}	—	December 5, 2000	Socorro	LINEAR	·	2.8 km	MPC · JPL
193480	2000 XL_{41}	—	December 5, 2000	Socorro	LINEAR	·	2.6 km	MPC · JPL
193481	2000 XU_{42}	—	December 5, 2000	Socorro	LINEAR	·	2.9 km	MPC · JPL
193482	2000 XQ_{43}	—	December 5, 2000	Socorro	LINEAR	·	4.3 km	MPC · JPL
193483	2000 XN_{46}	—	December 7, 2000	Socorro	LINEAR	·	2.7 km	MPC · JPL
193484	2000 XY_{52}	—	December 6, 2000	Socorro	LINEAR	BRG	3.5 km	MPC · JPL
193485	2000 XD_{53}	—	December 6, 2000	Socorro	LINEAR	·	2.9 km	MPC · JPL
193486	2000 XF_{53}	—	December 6, 2000	Socorro	LINEAR	·	3.7 km	MPC · JPL
193487	2000 XL_{53}	—	December 14, 2000	Bohyunsan	Jeon, Y.-B., Lee, B.-C.	·	1.9 km	MPC · JPL
193488	2000 YQ	—	December 16, 2000	Socorro	LINEAR	·	3.8 km	MPC · JPL
193489	2000 YT_{1}	—	December 17, 2000	Socorro	LINEAR	·	3.3 km	MPC · JPL
193490	2000 YW_{5}	—	December 19, 2000	Socorro	LINEAR	·	3.4 km	MPC · JPL
193491	2000 YE_{6}	—	December 20, 2000	Socorro	LINEAR	(5)	2.3 km	MPC · JPL
193492	2000 YH_{6}	—	December 20, 2000	Socorro	LINEAR	(5)	2.2 km	MPC · JPL
193493	2000 YZ_{7}	—	December 21, 2000	Heppenheim	Starkenburg	(5)	1.5 km	MPC · JPL
193494	2000 YX_{9}	—	December 20, 2000	Socorro	LINEAR	·	2.4 km	MPC · JPL
193495	2000 YK_{10}	—	December 21, 2000	Socorro	LINEAR	·	4.7 km	MPC · JPL
193496	2000 YA_{16}	—	December 22, 2000	Anderson Mesa	LONEOS	·	1.9 km	MPC · JPL
193497	2000 YR_{16}	—	December 20, 2000	Socorro	LINEAR	H	960 m	MPC · JPL
193498	2000 YS_{17}	—	December 25, 2000	Ondřejov	P. Kušnirák	(5)	4.1 km	MPC · JPL
193499	2000 YL_{20}	—	December 27, 2000	Kitt Peak	Spacewatch	EUN	2.6 km	MPC · JPL
193500	2000 YX_{22}	—	December 28, 2000	Kitt Peak	Spacewatch	·	2.1 km	MPC · JPL

== 193501–193600 ==
back to top

Designation			Discovery			Properties		Ref
Permanent	Provisional	Named after	Date	Site	Discoverer(s)	Category	Diam.	Ref
193501	2000 YL_{23}	—	December 28, 2000	Kitt Peak	Spacewatch	T_{j} (2.97) · HIL · 3:2	7.1 km	MPC · JPL
193502	2000 YR_{24}	—	December 28, 2000	Kitt Peak	Spacewatch	·	2.2 km	MPC · JPL
193503	2000 YC_{27}	—	December 26, 2000	Haleakala	NEAT	HNS	1.8 km	MPC · JPL
193504	2000 YH_{36}	—	December 30, 2000	Socorro	LINEAR	(5)	2.2 km	MPC · JPL
193505	2000 YP_{36}	—	December 30, 2000	Socorro	LINEAR	·	4.5 km	MPC · JPL
193506	2000 YY_{38}	—	December 30, 2000	Socorro	LINEAR	·	3.7 km	MPC · JPL
193507	2000 YF_{40}	—	December 30, 2000	Socorro	LINEAR	·	2.7 km	MPC · JPL
193508	2000 YG_{46}	—	December 30, 2000	Socorro	LINEAR	(5)	1.9 km	MPC · JPL
193509	2000 YV_{46}	—	December 30, 2000	Socorro	LINEAR	·	2.5 km	MPC · JPL
193510	2000 YL_{50}	—	December 30, 2000	Socorro	LINEAR	(5)	1.9 km	MPC · JPL
193511	2000 YS_{50}	—	December 30, 2000	Socorro	LINEAR	EUN	2.5 km	MPC · JPL
193512	2000 YG_{52}	—	December 30, 2000	Socorro	LINEAR	·	4.8 km	MPC · JPL
193513	2000 YG_{53}	—	December 30, 2000	Socorro	LINEAR	KON	4.4 km	MPC · JPL
193514	2000 YA_{55}	—	December 30, 2000	Socorro	LINEAR	·	2.6 km	MPC · JPL
193515	2000 YU_{55}	—	December 30, 2000	Socorro	LINEAR	·	2.7 km	MPC · JPL
193516	2000 YL_{57}	—	December 30, 2000	Socorro	LINEAR	·	3.4 km	MPC · JPL
193517	2000 YR_{57}	—	December 30, 2000	Socorro	LINEAR	(5) · fast	1.9 km	MPC · JPL
193518	2000 YA_{59}	—	December 30, 2000	Socorro	LINEAR	·	2.9 km	MPC · JPL
193519	2000 YP_{60}	—	December 30, 2000	Socorro	LINEAR	·	4.9 km	MPC · JPL
193520	2000 YS_{60}	—	December 30, 2000	Socorro	LINEAR	·	3.5 km	MPC · JPL
193521	2000 YG_{63}	—	December 30, 2000	Socorro	LINEAR	·	2.5 km	MPC · JPL
193522	2000 YL_{66}	—	December 30, 2000	Haleakala	NEAT	H	920 m	MPC · JPL
193523	2000 YE_{73}	—	December 30, 2000	Socorro	LINEAR	·	2.3 km	MPC · JPL
193524	2000 YZ_{74}	—	December 30, 2000	Socorro	LINEAR	·	1.7 km	MPC · JPL
193525	2000 YL_{80}	—	December 30, 2000	Socorro	LINEAR	·	2.7 km	MPC · JPL
193526	2000 YB_{83}	—	December 30, 2000	Socorro	LINEAR	·	3.2 km	MPC · JPL
193527	2000 YU_{83}	—	December 30, 2000	Socorro	LINEAR	·	2.8 km	MPC · JPL
193528	2000 YB_{86}	—	December 30, 2000	Socorro	LINEAR	·	1.8 km	MPC · JPL
193529	2000 YV_{86}	—	December 30, 2000	Socorro	LINEAR	·	2.0 km	MPC · JPL
193530	2000 YM_{91}	—	December 30, 2000	Socorro	LINEAR	·	4.7 km	MPC · JPL
193531	2000 YZ_{91}	—	December 30, 2000	Socorro	LINEAR	·	2.6 km	MPC · JPL
193532	2000 YC_{96}	—	December 30, 2000	Socorro	LINEAR	MIS	3.2 km	MPC · JPL
193533	2000 YD_{97}	—	December 30, 2000	Socorro	LINEAR	EUN	2.3 km	MPC · JPL
193534	2000 YQ_{109}	—	December 30, 2000	Socorro	LINEAR	·	4.0 km	MPC · JPL
193535	2000 YS_{109}	—	December 30, 2000	Socorro	LINEAR	L4	10 km	MPC · JPL
193536	2000 YT_{109}	—	December 30, 2000	Socorro	LINEAR	·	2.3 km	MPC · JPL
193537	2000 YU_{112}	—	December 30, 2000	Socorro	LINEAR	·	1.9 km	MPC · JPL
193538	2000 YX_{112}	—	December 30, 2000	Socorro	LINEAR	MIS	2.7 km	MPC · JPL
193539	2000 YJ_{113}	—	December 30, 2000	Socorro	LINEAR	EUN	2.4 km	MPC · JPL
193540	2000 YN_{113}	—	December 30, 2000	Socorro	LINEAR	·	3.0 km	MPC · JPL
193541	2000 YO_{113}	—	December 30, 2000	Socorro	LINEAR	·	4.8 km	MPC · JPL
193542	2000 YC_{114}	—	December 30, 2000	Socorro	LINEAR	·	1.8 km	MPC · JPL
193543	2000 YT_{115}	—	December 30, 2000	Socorro	LINEAR	(5)	2.2 km	MPC · JPL
193544	2000 YL_{117}	—	December 30, 2000	Socorro	LINEAR	·	2.2 km	MPC · JPL
193545	2000 YN_{117}	—	December 30, 2000	Socorro	LINEAR	·	3.9 km	MPC · JPL
193546	2000 YJ_{120}	—	December 19, 2000	Socorro	LINEAR	JUN	2.0 km	MPC · JPL
193547	2000 YY_{120}	—	December 20, 2000	Socorro	LINEAR	EUN	1.9 km	MPC · JPL
193548	2000 YD_{121}	—	December 21, 2000	Socorro	LINEAR	·	2.2 km	MPC · JPL
193549	2000 YE_{122}	—	December 28, 2000	Kitt Peak	Spacewatch	·	2.4 km	MPC · JPL
193550	2000 YM_{125}	—	December 29, 2000	Anderson Mesa	LONEOS	·	2.7 km	MPC · JPL
193551	2000 YX_{125}	—	December 29, 2000	Anderson Mesa	LONEOS	·	2.5 km	MPC · JPL
193552	2000 YR_{126}	—	December 29, 2000	Anderson Mesa	LONEOS	·	1.8 km	MPC · JPL
193553	2000 YF_{132}	—	December 30, 2000	Socorro	LINEAR	·	2.7 km	MPC · JPL
193554	2000 YH_{133}	—	December 31, 2000	Anderson Mesa	LONEOS	·	1.8 km	MPC · JPL
193555	2000 YL_{136}	—	December 23, 2000	Socorro	LINEAR	·	1.9 km	MPC · JPL
193556	2000 YX_{139}	—	December 31, 2000	Anderson Mesa	LONEOS	·	2.3 km	MPC · JPL
193557	2001 AS_{3}	—	January 2, 2001	Socorro	LINEAR	·	2.1 km	MPC · JPL
193558	2001 AA_{4}	—	January 2, 2001	Socorro	LINEAR	·	3.4 km	MPC · JPL
193559	2001 AM_{4}	—	January 2, 2001	Socorro	LINEAR	·	2.0 km	MPC · JPL
193560	2001 AW_{10}	—	January 2, 2001	Socorro	LINEAR	·	3.1 km	MPC · JPL
193561	2001 AG_{11}	—	January 2, 2001	Socorro	LINEAR	·	1.8 km	MPC · JPL
193562	2001 AZ_{11}	—	January 2, 2001	Socorro	LINEAR	·	7.4 km	MPC · JPL
193563	2001 AO_{12}	—	January 2, 2001	Socorro	LINEAR	ADE	5.4 km	MPC · JPL
193564	2001 AW_{15}	—	January 2, 2001	Socorro	LINEAR	·	2.3 km	MPC · JPL
193565	2001 AJ_{27}	—	January 5, 2001	Socorro	LINEAR	·	2.3 km	MPC · JPL
193566	2001 AR_{30}	—	January 4, 2001	Socorro	LINEAR	·	2.0 km	MPC · JPL
193567	2001 AE_{32}	—	January 4, 2001	Socorro	LINEAR	·	2.7 km	MPC · JPL
193568	2001 AO_{33}	—	January 4, 2001	Socorro	LINEAR	·	2.9 km	MPC · JPL
193569	2001 AB_{34}	—	January 4, 2001	Socorro	LINEAR	·	2.5 km	MPC · JPL
193570	2001 AR_{36}	—	January 5, 2001	Socorro	LINEAR	L4	20 km	MPC · JPL
193571	2001 AG_{40}	—	January 3, 2001	Anderson Mesa	LONEOS	(5)	1.9 km	MPC · JPL
193572	2001 AW_{40}	—	January 3, 2001	Anderson Mesa	LONEOS	(5)	2.3 km	MPC · JPL
193573	2001 AM_{42}	—	January 4, 2001	Anderson Mesa	LONEOS	(5)	1.6 km	MPC · JPL
193574	2001 BB	—	January 17, 2001	Oizumi	T. Kobayashi	MRX	2.5 km	MPC · JPL
193575	2001 BF	—	January 17, 2001	Oizumi	T. Kobayashi	GEF	2.5 km	MPC · JPL
193576	2001 BG	—	January 17, 2001	Oizumi	T. Kobayashi	·	2.0 km	MPC · JPL
193577	2001 BY_{1}	—	January 16, 2001	Kitt Peak	Spacewatch	·	1.9 km	MPC · JPL
193578	2001 BH_{2}	—	January 16, 2001	Haleakala	NEAT	·	3.0 km	MPC · JPL
193579	2001 BS_{2}	—	January 18, 2001	Socorro	LINEAR	H	940 m	MPC · JPL
193580	2001 BM_{6}	—	January 19, 2001	Socorro	LINEAR	·	3.1 km	MPC · JPL
193581	2001 BW_{9}	—	January 16, 2001	Kitt Peak	Spacewatch	·	2.2 km	MPC · JPL
193582	2001 BF_{11}	—	January 16, 2001	Haleakala	NEAT	JUN	1.8 km	MPC · JPL
193583	2001 BG_{21}	—	January 19, 2001	Socorro	LINEAR	(5)	2.3 km	MPC · JPL
193584	2001 BL_{22}	—	January 20, 2001	Socorro	LINEAR	·	6.1 km	MPC · JPL
193585	2001 BB_{26}	—	January 20, 2001	Socorro	LINEAR	·	4.7 km	MPC · JPL
193586	2001 BT_{37}	—	January 21, 2001	Socorro	LINEAR	·	2.2 km	MPC · JPL
193587	2001 BQ_{38}	—	January 23, 2001	Oizumi	T. Kobayashi	·	3.9 km	MPC · JPL
193588	2001 BE_{40}	—	January 18, 2001	Socorro	LINEAR	·	6.0 km	MPC · JPL
193589	2001 BS_{42}	—	January 19, 2001	Socorro	LINEAR	·	3.0 km	MPC · JPL
193590	2001 BQ_{45}	—	January 21, 2001	Socorro	LINEAR	ADE	5.5 km	MPC · JPL
193591	2001 BV_{45}	—	January 21, 2001	Socorro	LINEAR	·	2.6 km	MPC · JPL
193592	2001 BN_{46}	—	January 21, 2001	Socorro	LINEAR	L4	10 km	MPC · JPL
193593	2001 BR_{46}	—	January 21, 2001	Socorro	LINEAR	(18466)	4.7 km	MPC · JPL
193594	2001 BQ_{49}	—	January 21, 2001	Socorro	LINEAR	·	2.5 km	MPC · JPL
193595	2001 BK_{55}	—	January 19, 2001	Socorro	LINEAR	RAF	1.6 km	MPC · JPL
193596	2001 BV_{60}	—	January 26, 2001	Socorro	LINEAR	·	3.1 km	MPC · JPL
193597	2001 BO_{63}	—	January 29, 2001	Socorro	LINEAR	·	2.1 km	MPC · JPL
193598	2001 BF_{65}	—	January 26, 2001	Socorro	LINEAR	·	2.1 km	MPC · JPL
193599	2001 BJ_{66}	—	January 26, 2001	Socorro	LINEAR	·	3.2 km	MPC · JPL
193600	2001 BO_{67}	—	January 31, 2001	Socorro	LINEAR	·	3.5 km	MPC · JPL

== 193601–193700 ==
back to top

Designation			Discovery			Properties		Ref
Permanent	Provisional	Named after	Date	Site	Discoverer(s)	Category	Diam.	Ref
193601	2001 BQ_{68}	—	January 31, 2001	Socorro	LINEAR	·	2.5 km	MPC · JPL
193602	2001 BL_{70}	—	January 21, 2001	Socorro	LINEAR	L4	20 km	MPC · JPL
193603	2001 BU_{71}	—	January 29, 2001	Socorro	LINEAR	·	2.6 km	MPC · JPL
193604	2001 BG_{73}	—	January 28, 2001	Haleakala	NEAT	JUN	1.6 km	MPC · JPL
193605	2001 BX_{75}	—	January 26, 2001	Socorro	LINEAR	DOR	4.8 km	MPC · JPL
193606	2001 BF_{78}	—	January 24, 2001	Kitt Peak	Spacewatch	·	4.6 km	MPC · JPL
193607	2001 BH_{82}	—	January 18, 2001	Socorro	LINEAR	·	2.3 km	MPC · JPL
193608	2001 CD_{2}	—	February 1, 2001	Socorro	LINEAR	(5)	2.1 km	MPC · JPL
193609	2001 CA_{7}	—	February 1, 2001	Socorro	LINEAR	·	3.4 km	MPC · JPL
193610	2001 CS_{8}	—	February 1, 2001	Socorro	LINEAR	(5)	2.7 km	MPC · JPL
193611	2001 CQ_{12}	—	February 1, 2001	Socorro	LINEAR	·	2.9 km	MPC · JPL
193612	2001 CG_{13}	—	February 1, 2001	Socorro	LINEAR	·	4.4 km	MPC · JPL
193613	2001 CW_{13}	—	February 1, 2001	Socorro	LINEAR	·	5.8 km	MPC · JPL
193614	2001 CZ_{13}	—	February 1, 2001	Socorro	LINEAR	DOR	3.8 km	MPC · JPL
193615	2001 CY_{16}	—	February 1, 2001	Socorro	LINEAR	·	3.4 km	MPC · JPL
193616	2001 CZ_{17}	—	February 2, 2001	Socorro	LINEAR	EUN	2.3 km	MPC · JPL
193617	2001 CO_{18}	—	February 2, 2001	Socorro	LINEAR	·	2.5 km	MPC · JPL
193618	2001 CP_{19}	—	February 2, 2001	Socorro	LINEAR	·	3.1 km	MPC · JPL
193619	2001 CL_{21}	—	February 1, 2001	Anderson Mesa	LONEOS	·	3.7 km	MPC · JPL
193620	2001 CZ_{21}	—	February 1, 2001	Anderson Mesa	LONEOS	MIS	3.4 km	MPC · JPL
193621	2001 CU_{24}	—	February 1, 2001	Socorro	LINEAR	·	2.8 km	MPC · JPL
193622	2001 CR_{25}	—	February 1, 2001	Socorro	LINEAR	ADE	4.0 km	MPC · JPL
193623	2001 CC_{26}	—	February 1, 2001	Kitt Peak	Spacewatch	·	2.6 km	MPC · JPL
193624	2001 CW_{26}	—	February 1, 2001	Haleakala	NEAT	·	3.1 km	MPC · JPL
193625	2001 CD_{29}	—	February 2, 2001	Anderson Mesa	LONEOS	·	2.4 km	MPC · JPL
193626	2001 CV_{31}	—	February 5, 2001	Socorro	LINEAR	·	5.0 km	MPC · JPL
193627	2001 CD_{33}	—	February 13, 2001	Socorro	LINEAR	·	3.4 km	MPC · JPL
193628	2001 CQ_{33}	—	February 13, 2001	Socorro	LINEAR	·	1.8 km	MPC · JPL
193629	2001 CY_{33}	—	February 13, 2001	Socorro	LINEAR	·	4.8 km	MPC · JPL
193630	2001 CY_{34}	—	February 13, 2001	Socorro	LINEAR	EUN	2.1 km	MPC · JPL
193631	2001 CA_{37}	—	February 14, 2001	Ondřejov	L. Kotková	(5)	1.4 km	MPC · JPL
193632	2001 CU_{37}	—	February 15, 2001	Socorro	LINEAR	H	1.1 km	MPC · JPL
193633	2001 CY_{39}	—	February 13, 2001	Socorro	LINEAR	·	3.7 km	MPC · JPL
193634	2001 CS_{44}	—	February 15, 2001	Socorro	LINEAR	·	3.8 km	MPC · JPL
193635	2001 CQ_{45}	—	February 15, 2001	Socorro	LINEAR	·	3.9 km	MPC · JPL
193636	2001 CS_{45}	—	February 15, 2001	Socorro	LINEAR	·	1.8 km	MPC · JPL
193637	2001 CQ_{48}	—	February 12, 2001	Anderson Mesa	LONEOS	·	2.4 km	MPC · JPL
193638	2001 DY_{2}	—	February 16, 2001	Socorro	LINEAR	H	1.3 km	MPC · JPL
193639	2001 DK_{13}	—	February 19, 2001	Oizumi	T. Kobayashi	DOR	4.7 km	MPC · JPL
193640	2001 DJ_{15}	—	February 16, 2001	Socorro	LINEAR	·	4.0 km	MPC · JPL
193641	2001 DH_{16}	—	February 16, 2001	Socorro	LINEAR	L4	13 km	MPC · JPL
193642	2001 DH_{18}	—	February 16, 2001	Socorro	LINEAR	·	5.3 km	MPC · JPL
193643	2001 DK_{18}	—	February 16, 2001	Socorro	LINEAR	·	2.9 km	MPC · JPL
193644	2001 DL_{22}	—	February 16, 2001	Socorro	LINEAR	·	3.7 km	MPC · JPL
193645	2001 DL_{23}	—	February 17, 2001	Socorro	LINEAR	GEF	2.1 km	MPC · JPL
193646	2001 DF_{26}	—	February 17, 2001	Socorro	LINEAR	(5)	3.5 km	MPC · JPL
193647	2001 DB_{28}	—	February 17, 2001	Socorro	LINEAR	·	2.8 km	MPC · JPL
193648	2001 DT_{30}	—	February 17, 2001	Socorro	LINEAR	·	2.6 km	MPC · JPL
193649	2001 DA_{38}	—	February 19, 2001	Socorro	LINEAR	·	3.4 km	MPC · JPL
193650	2001 DU_{38}	—	February 19, 2001	Socorro	LINEAR	·	2.6 km	MPC · JPL
193651	2001 DL_{41}	—	February 19, 2001	Socorro	LINEAR	·	4.7 km	MPC · JPL
193652	2001 DX_{41}	—	February 19, 2001	Socorro	LINEAR	·	2.8 km	MPC · JPL
193653	2001 DB_{42}	—	February 19, 2001	Socorro	LINEAR	·	2.8 km	MPC · JPL
193654	2001 DV_{42}	—	February 19, 2001	Socorro	LINEAR	·	2.2 km	MPC · JPL
193655	2001 DV_{44}	—	February 19, 2001	Socorro	LINEAR	·	2.6 km	MPC · JPL
193656	2001 DK_{45}	—	February 19, 2001	Socorro	LINEAR	MIS	3.8 km	MPC · JPL
193657	2001 DP_{48}	—	February 16, 2001	Socorro	LINEAR	·	2.3 km	MPC · JPL
193658	2001 DH_{50}	—	February 16, 2001	Socorro	LINEAR	·	4.5 km	MPC · JPL
193659	2001 DX_{53}	—	February 20, 2001	Črni Vrh	Matičič, S.	·	2.2 km	MPC · JPL
193660	2001 DB_{55}	—	February 16, 2001	Kitt Peak	Spacewatch	KOR	1.6 km	MPC · JPL
193661	2001 DH_{56}	—	February 16, 2001	Kitt Peak	Spacewatch	AGN	1.9 km	MPC · JPL
193662	2001 DA_{60}	—	February 19, 2001	Socorro	LINEAR	·	1.8 km	MPC · JPL
193663	2001 DG_{62}	—	February 19, 2001	Socorro	LINEAR	DOR	3.1 km	MPC · JPL
193664	2001 DR_{62}	—	February 19, 2001	Socorro	LINEAR	MIS	3.1 km	MPC · JPL
193665	2001 DU_{62}	—	February 19, 2001	Socorro	LINEAR	·	3.8 km	MPC · JPL
193666	2001 DE_{63}	—	February 19, 2001	Socorro	LINEAR	·	2.0 km	MPC · JPL
193667	2001 DU_{64}	—	February 19, 2001	Socorro	LINEAR	·	2.7 km	MPC · JPL
193668	2001 DJ_{66}	—	February 19, 2001	Socorro	LINEAR	·	3.4 km	MPC · JPL
193669	2001 DV_{66}	—	February 19, 2001	Socorro	LINEAR	AGN	1.9 km	MPC · JPL
193670	2001 DY_{76}	—	February 22, 2001	Kitt Peak	Spacewatch	L4	10 km	MPC · JPL
193671	2001 DV_{84}	—	February 23, 2001	Cerro Tololo	Deep Lens Survey	·	2.6 km	MPC · JPL
193672	2001 DA_{91}	—	February 21, 2001	Haleakala	NEAT	·	3.4 km	MPC · JPL
193673	2001 DQ_{96}	—	February 17, 2001	Socorro	LINEAR	·	1.9 km	MPC · JPL
193674	2001 DT_{99}	—	February 17, 2001	Haleakala	NEAT	·	3.8 km	MPC · JPL
193675	2001 DA_{100}	—	February 17, 2001	Haleakala	NEAT	EUN	2.2 km	MPC · JPL
193676	2001 DN_{103}	—	February 16, 2001	Socorro	LINEAR	·	3.1 km	MPC · JPL
193677	2001 DH_{104}	—	February 16, 2001	Anderson Mesa	LONEOS	·	4.6 km	MPC · JPL
193678	2001 DA_{105}	—	February 16, 2001	Anderson Mesa	LONEOS	ADE	3.4 km	MPC · JPL
193679	2001 EO_{1}	—	March 1, 2001	Socorro	LINEAR	·	2.2 km	MPC · JPL
193680	2001 EX_{1}	—	March 1, 2001	Socorro	LINEAR	ADE	4.6 km	MPC · JPL
193681	2001 EE_{8}	—	March 2, 2001	Anderson Mesa	LONEOS	·	2.6 km	MPC · JPL
193682	2001 EH_{14}	—	March 15, 2001	Socorro	LINEAR	·	8.5 km	MPC · JPL
193683	2001 EO_{14}	—	March 15, 2001	Socorro	LINEAR	·	4.4 km	MPC · JPL
193684	2001 EP_{15}	—	March 14, 2001	Socorro	LINEAR	·	6.1 km	MPC · JPL
193685	2001 EG_{16}	—	March 15, 2001	Haleakala	NEAT	·	1.8 km	MPC · JPL
193686	2001 EP_{25}	—	March 15, 2001	Haleakala	NEAT	·	3.3 km	MPC · JPL
193687	2001 ET_{27}	—	March 2, 2001	Anderson Mesa	LONEOS	·	2.2 km	MPC · JPL
193688	2001 FY_{2}	—	March 18, 2001	Socorro	LINEAR	·	3.3 km	MPC · JPL
193689	2001 FQ_{4}	—	March 19, 2001	Kitt Peak	Spacewatch	·	2.9 km	MPC · JPL
193690	2001 FE_{10}	—	March 19, 2001	Anderson Mesa	LONEOS	·	3.1 km	MPC · JPL
193691	2001 FG_{11}	—	March 19, 2001	Anderson Mesa	LONEOS	·	3.2 km	MPC · JPL
193692	2001 FA_{13}	—	March 19, 2001	Anderson Mesa	LONEOS	KOR	2.9 km	MPC · JPL
193693	2001 FZ_{24}	—	March 18, 2001	Socorro	LINEAR	·	4.0 km	MPC · JPL
193694	2001 FK_{25}	—	March 18, 2001	Socorro	LINEAR	·	6.1 km	MPC · JPL
193695	2001 FU_{29}	—	March 19, 2001	Haleakala	NEAT	·	4.7 km	MPC · JPL
193696	2001 FN_{37}	—	March 18, 2001	Socorro	LINEAR	·	3.8 km	MPC · JPL
193697	2001 FV_{42}	—	March 18, 2001	Socorro	LINEAR	·	2.1 km	MPC · JPL
193698	2001 FR_{45}	—	March 18, 2001	Socorro	LINEAR	(18466)	2.5 km	MPC · JPL
193699	2001 FQ_{52}	—	March 18, 2001	Socorro	LINEAR	·	2.5 km	MPC · JPL
193700	2001 FV_{57}	—	March 21, 2001	Socorro	LINEAR	·	2.2 km	MPC · JPL

== 193701–193800 ==
back to top

Designation			Discovery			Properties		Ref
Permanent	Provisional	Named after	Date	Site	Discoverer(s)	Category	Diam.	Ref
193701	2001 FH_{58}	—	March 19, 2001	Socorro	LINEAR	·	1.1 km	MPC · JPL
193702	2001 FS_{62}	—	March 19, 2001	Socorro	LINEAR	(5)	1.8 km	MPC · JPL
193703	2001 FX_{63}	—	March 19, 2001	Socorro	LINEAR	KOR	3.1 km	MPC · JPL
193704	2001 FQ_{65}	—	March 19, 2001	Socorro	LINEAR	·	3.6 km	MPC · JPL
193705	2001 FT_{69}	—	March 19, 2001	Socorro	LINEAR	EOS	3.1 km	MPC · JPL
193706	2001 FB_{75}	—	March 19, 2001	Socorro	LINEAR	·	7.0 km	MPC · JPL
193707	2001 FK_{79}	—	March 21, 2001	Socorro	LINEAR	·	4.7 km	MPC · JPL
193708	2001 FE_{80}	—	March 21, 2001	Socorro	LINEAR	·	3.0 km	MPC · JPL
193709	2001 FG_{82}	—	March 23, 2001	Socorro	LINEAR	·	3.5 km	MPC · JPL
193710	2001 FT_{82}	—	March 23, 2001	Socorro	LINEAR	·	5.3 km	MPC · JPL
193711	2001 FC_{83}	—	March 24, 2001	Socorro	LINEAR	·	4.5 km	MPC · JPL
193712	2001 FO_{84}	—	March 26, 2001	Kitt Peak	Spacewatch	·	3.4 km	MPC · JPL
193713	2001 FG_{87}	—	March 21, 2001	Anderson Mesa	LONEOS	EOS	3.3 km	MPC · JPL
193714	2001 FA_{90}	—	March 27, 2001	Kitt Peak	Spacewatch	·	2.9 km	MPC · JPL
193715	2001 FP_{91}	—	March 16, 2001	Kitt Peak	Spacewatch	·	3.8 km	MPC · JPL
193716	2001 FF_{100}	—	March 17, 2001	Socorro	LINEAR	·	6.9 km	MPC · JPL
193717	2001 FP_{102}	—	March 17, 2001	Eskridge	Farpoint	DOR	3.9 km	MPC · JPL
193718	2001 FW_{106}	—	March 18, 2001	Anderson Mesa	LONEOS	·	2.9 km	MPC · JPL
193719	2001 FY_{106}	—	March 18, 2001	Anderson Mesa	LONEOS	(5)	2.3 km	MPC · JPL
193720	2001 FE_{107}	—	March 18, 2001	Anderson Mesa	LONEOS	·	4.4 km	MPC · JPL
193721	2001 FN_{107}	—	March 18, 2001	Anderson Mesa	LONEOS	·	3.5 km	MPC · JPL
193722	2001 FR_{111}	—	March 18, 2001	Socorro	LINEAR	EOS ·	2.7 km	MPC · JPL
193723	2001 FP_{112}	—	March 18, 2001	Haleakala	NEAT	·	3.7 km	MPC · JPL
193724	2001 FT_{113}	—	March 19, 2001	Anderson Mesa	LONEOS	·	3.7 km	MPC · JPL
193725	2001 FR_{114}	—	March 19, 2001	Anderson Mesa	LONEOS	·	2.2 km	MPC · JPL
193726	2001 FQ_{139}	—	March 21, 2001	Kitt Peak	Spacewatch	·	4.9 km	MPC · JPL
193727	2001 FS_{139}	—	March 21, 2001	Kitt Peak	Spacewatch	·	930 m	MPC · JPL
193728	2001 FJ_{149}	—	March 24, 2001	Socorro	LINEAR	·	2.3 km	MPC · JPL
193729	2001 FZ_{153}	—	March 26, 2001	Socorro	LINEAR	·	4.8 km	MPC · JPL
193730	2001 FE_{156}	—	March 26, 2001	Haleakala	NEAT	·	3.1 km	MPC · JPL
193731	2001 FY_{162}	—	March 18, 2001	Socorro	LINEAR	·	3.7 km	MPC · JPL
193732	2001 FF_{168}	—	March 21, 2001	Kitt Peak	Spacewatch	·	3.1 km	MPC · JPL
193733	2001 FX_{169}	—	March 24, 2001	Kitt Peak	Spacewatch	·	2.8 km	MPC · JPL
193734	2001 FY_{179}	—	March 20, 2001	Anderson Mesa	LONEOS	·	4.3 km	MPC · JPL
193735	2001 FD_{180}	—	March 20, 2001	Anderson Mesa	LONEOS	GEF	2.4 km	MPC · JPL
193736 Henrythroop	2001 FQ_{182}	Henrythroop	March 25, 2001	Kitt Peak	M. W. Buie	·	2.5 km	MPC · JPL
193737	2001 FY_{185}	—	March 16, 2001	Socorro	LINEAR	·	4.1 km	MPC · JPL
193738	2001 FT_{186}	—	March 18, 2001	Anderson Mesa	LONEOS	·	3.2 km	MPC · JPL
193739	2001 FQ_{187}	—	March 20, 2001	Kitt Peak	Spacewatch	KOR	1.7 km	MPC · JPL
193740	2001 FK_{188}	—	March 16, 2001	Socorro	LINEAR	·	2.7 km	MPC · JPL
193741	2001 HY_{19}	—	April 26, 2001	Kitt Peak	Spacewatch	·	3.3 km	MPC · JPL
193742	2001 HE_{33}	—	April 27, 2001	Socorro	LINEAR	·	4.2 km	MPC · JPL
193743	2001 HG_{54}	—	April 24, 2001	Anderson Mesa	LONEOS	·	6.5 km	MPC · JPL
193744	2001 HW_{56}	—	April 24, 2001	Haleakala	NEAT	T_{j} (2.99)	8.7 km	MPC · JPL
193745	2001 HX_{58}	—	April 17, 2001	Anderson Mesa	LONEOS	slow	8.2 km	MPC · JPL
193746	2001 JB_{3}	—	May 15, 2001	Anderson Mesa	LONEOS	·	5.4 km	MPC · JPL
193747	2001 JZ_{3}	—	May 15, 2001	Haleakala	NEAT	·	4.6 km	MPC · JPL
193748	2001 JS_{9}	—	May 15, 2001	Haleakala	NEAT	VER	6.3 km	MPC · JPL
193749	2001 KG	—	May 17, 2001	Socorro	LINEAR	·	1.4 km	MPC · JPL
193750	2001 KC_{3}	—	May 17, 2001	Socorro	LINEAR	·	5.4 km	MPC · JPL
193751	2001 KH_{9}	—	May 18, 2001	Socorro	LINEAR	·	4.6 km	MPC · JPL
193752	2001 KR_{15}	—	May 18, 2001	Socorro	LINEAR	·	1.2 km	MPC · JPL
193753	2001 KB_{25}	—	May 17, 2001	Socorro	LINEAR	·	3.6 km	MPC · JPL
193754	2001 KH_{31}	—	May 22, 2001	Socorro	LINEAR	·	1.1 km	MPC · JPL
193755	2001 KP_{40}	—	May 23, 2001	Socorro	LINEAR	·	8.4 km	MPC · JPL
193756	2001 KA_{51}	—	May 21, 2001	Socorro	LINEAR	·	5.9 km	MPC · JPL
193757	2001 KV_{60}	—	May 17, 2001	Kitt Peak	Spacewatch	·	1.0 km	MPC · JPL
193758	2001 KN_{66}	—	May 23, 2001	Socorro	LINEAR	·	4.9 km	MPC · JPL
193759	2001 KG_{72}	—	May 24, 2001	Socorro	LINEAR	·	7.3 km	MPC · JPL
193760	2001 KY_{73}	—	May 25, 2001	Kitt Peak	Spacewatch	·	5.1 km	MPC · JPL
193761	2001 KB_{74}	—	May 25, 2001	Kitt Peak	Spacewatch	EOS	2.7 km	MPC · JPL
193762	2001 KO_{74}	—	May 26, 2001	Socorro	LINEAR	·	4.6 km	MPC · JPL
193763	2001 LF_{12}	—	June 15, 2001	Socorro	LINEAR	·	7.2 km	MPC · JPL
193764	2001 LG_{13}	—	June 15, 2001	Socorro	LINEAR	·	1.1 km	MPC · JPL
193765	2001 MQ	—	June 17, 2001	Palomar	NEAT	·	7.7 km	MPC · JPL
193766	2001 MW_{1}	—	June 18, 2001	Wise	Wise	·	1.8 km	MPC · JPL
193767	2001 ME_{13}	—	June 23, 2001	Palomar	NEAT	·	1.3 km	MPC · JPL
193768	2001 MW_{16}	—	June 27, 2001	Palomar	NEAT	·	940 m	MPC · JPL
193769	2001 MH_{23}	—	June 27, 2001	Haleakala	NEAT	·	1.2 km	MPC · JPL
193770	2001 NK	—	July 9, 2001	Needville	J. Dellinger, W. G. Dillon	·	1.1 km	MPC · JPL
193771	2001 NW_{2}	—	July 12, 2001	Palomar	NEAT	·	5.5 km	MPC · JPL
193772	2001 NK_{4}	—	July 13, 2001	Palomar	NEAT	·	5.4 km	MPC · JPL
193773	2001 OX	—	July 17, 2001	Haleakala	NEAT	·	1.3 km	MPC · JPL
193774	2001 OK_{5}	—	July 17, 2001	Anderson Mesa	LONEOS	·	1.4 km	MPC · JPL
193775	2001 OL_{5}	—	July 17, 2001	Anderson Mesa	LONEOS	·	1.6 km	MPC · JPL
193776	2001 OT_{11}	—	July 18, 2001	Haleakala	NEAT	·	1.1 km	MPC · JPL
193777	2001 OG_{15}	—	July 18, 2001	Palomar	NEAT	·	1.0 km	MPC · JPL
193778	2001 OM_{16}	—	July 22, 2001	Jonathan B. Postel	Pozzoli, V.	·	880 m	MPC · JPL
193779	2001 OT_{17}	—	July 17, 2001	Haleakala	NEAT	·	1.2 km	MPC · JPL
193780	2001 OX_{24}	—	July 16, 2001	Anderson Mesa	LONEOS	·	1.0 km	MPC · JPL
193781	2001 OR_{25}	—	July 18, 2001	Haleakala	NEAT	·	1.1 km	MPC · JPL
193782	2001 OA_{34}	—	July 19, 2001	Palomar	NEAT	·	1.1 km	MPC · JPL
193783	2001 OT_{34}	—	July 19, 2001	Palomar	NEAT	·	940 m	MPC · JPL
193784	2001 OT_{40}	—	July 20, 2001	Palomar	NEAT	·	1.1 km	MPC · JPL
193785	2001 OX_{44}	—	July 16, 2001	Anderson Mesa	LONEOS	·	1.2 km	MPC · JPL
193786	2001 OP_{48}	—	July 16, 2001	Haleakala	NEAT	·	1.2 km	MPC · JPL
193787	2001 OJ_{51}	—	July 21, 2001	Palomar	NEAT	·	2.0 km	MPC · JPL
193788	2001 OZ_{53}	—	July 21, 2001	Palomar	NEAT	PHO	1.9 km	MPC · JPL
193789	2001 OB_{59}	—	July 21, 2001	Haleakala	NEAT	·	1.1 km	MPC · JPL
193790	2001 OL_{72}	—	July 21, 2001	Anderson Mesa	LONEOS	·	1.6 km	MPC · JPL
193791	2001 OE_{73}	—	July 21, 2001	Anderson Mesa	LONEOS	·	1.4 km	MPC · JPL
193792	2001 OB_{79}	—	July 26, 2001	Palomar	NEAT	·	1.1 km	MPC · JPL
193793	2001 OR_{79}	—	July 27, 2001	Palomar	NEAT	·	840 m	MPC · JPL
193794	2001 OB_{87}	—	July 29, 2001	Palomar	NEAT	·	1.5 km	MPC · JPL
193795	2001 OF_{98}	—	July 25, 2001	Haleakala	NEAT	·	1.3 km	MPC · JPL
193796	2001 OB_{104}	—	July 30, 2001	Socorro	LINEAR	·	990 m	MPC · JPL
193797	2001 OO_{106}	—	July 29, 2001	Socorro	LINEAR	·	1.6 km	MPC · JPL
193798	2001 PF_{8}	—	August 11, 2001	Palomar	NEAT	·	960 m	MPC · JPL
193799	2001 PE_{12}	—	August 11, 2001	Haleakala	NEAT	·	960 m	MPC · JPL
193800	2001 PM_{12}	—	August 12, 2001	Palomar	NEAT	·	1.3 km	MPC · JPL

== 193801–193900 ==
back to top

Designation			Discovery			Properties		Ref
Permanent	Provisional	Named after	Date	Site	Discoverer(s)	Category	Diam.	Ref
193801	2001 PV_{13}	—	August 14, 2001	Emerald Lane	L. Ball	·	780 m	MPC · JPL
193802	2001 PS_{17}	—	August 9, 2001	Palomar	NEAT	·	990 m	MPC · JPL
193803	2001 PF_{19}	—	August 10, 2001	Palomar	NEAT	·	1.3 km	MPC · JPL
193804	2001 PQ_{20}	—	August 10, 2001	Palomar	NEAT	·	1.4 km	MPC · JPL
193805	2001 PA_{21}	—	August 10, 2001	Haleakala	NEAT	·	1.1 km	MPC · JPL
193806	2001 PO_{21}	—	August 10, 2001	Haleakala	NEAT	·	1.1 km	MPC · JPL
193807	2001 PM_{22}	—	August 10, 2001	Haleakala	NEAT	·	3.5 km	MPC · JPL
193808	2001 PK_{23}	—	August 11, 2001	Haleakala	NEAT	·	1.1 km	MPC · JPL
193809	2001 PQ_{27}	—	August 11, 2001	Haleakala	NEAT	·	1.7 km	MPC · JPL
193810	2001 PA_{39}	—	August 11, 2001	Palomar	NEAT	CYB	7.7 km	MPC · JPL
193811	2001 PP_{42}	—	August 12, 2001	Palomar	NEAT	·	1.3 km	MPC · JPL
193812	2001 PV_{50}	—	August 10, 2001	Palomar	NEAT	slow	990 m	MPC · JPL
193813	2001 PM_{52}	—	August 15, 2001	Haleakala	NEAT	·	1.4 km	MPC · JPL
193814	2001 PV_{57}	—	August 14, 2001	Haleakala	NEAT	·	1.1 km	MPC · JPL
193815	2001 PW_{57}	—	August 14, 2001	Haleakala	NEAT	·	830 m	MPC · JPL
193816	2001 PM_{65}	—	August 12, 2001	Palomar	NEAT	·	2.4 km	MPC · JPL
193817	2001 PR_{65}	—	August 13, 2001	Haleakala	NEAT	·	1.7 km	MPC · JPL
193818 Polidoro	2001 QH	Polidoro	August 16, 2001	San Marcello	L. Tesi, G. Forti	·	1.4 km	MPC · JPL
193819	2001 QE_{8}	—	August 16, 2001	Socorro	LINEAR	·	1.3 km	MPC · JPL
193820	2001 QV_{9}	—	August 16, 2001	Socorro	LINEAR	·	820 m	MPC · JPL
193821	2001 QN_{17}	—	August 16, 2001	Socorro	LINEAR	·	840 m	MPC · JPL
193822	2001 QD_{20}	—	August 16, 2001	Socorro	LINEAR	·	1.0 km	MPC · JPL
193823	2001 QL_{26}	—	August 16, 2001	Socorro	LINEAR	·	1.3 km	MPC · JPL
193824	2001 QO_{26}	—	August 16, 2001	Socorro	LINEAR	·	1.4 km	MPC · JPL
193825	2001 QT_{27}	—	August 16, 2001	Socorro	LINEAR	·	1.5 km	MPC · JPL
193826	2001 QM_{32}	—	August 17, 2001	Socorro	LINEAR	HYG	4.8 km	MPC · JPL
193827	2001 QX_{34}	—	August 16, 2001	Socorro	LINEAR	·	980 m	MPC · JPL
193828	2001 QC_{35}	—	August 16, 2001	Socorro	LINEAR	·	940 m	MPC · JPL
193829	2001 QX_{38}	—	August 16, 2001	Socorro	LINEAR	·	850 m	MPC · JPL
193830	2001 QS_{41}	—	August 16, 2001	Socorro	LINEAR	·	4.4 km	MPC · JPL
193831	2001 QU_{42}	—	August 16, 2001	Socorro	LINEAR	·	1.4 km	MPC · JPL
193832	2001 QW_{42}	—	August 16, 2001	Socorro	LINEAR	·	1.1 km	MPC · JPL
193833	2001 QG_{43}	—	August 16, 2001	Socorro	LINEAR	·	1.2 km	MPC · JPL
193834	2001 QQ_{43}	—	August 16, 2001	Socorro	LINEAR	·	900 m	MPC · JPL
193835	2001 QZ_{47}	—	August 16, 2001	Socorro	LINEAR	·	1.0 km	MPC · JPL
193836	2001 QG_{48}	—	August 16, 2001	Socorro	LINEAR	·	1.4 km	MPC · JPL
193837	2001 QQ_{52}	—	August 16, 2001	Socorro	LINEAR	·	950 m	MPC · JPL
193838	2001 QQ_{55}	—	August 16, 2001	Socorro	LINEAR	·	1.2 km	MPC · JPL
193839	2001 QM_{56}	—	August 16, 2001	Socorro	LINEAR	·	1.5 km	MPC · JPL
193840	2001 QC_{59}	—	August 17, 2001	Socorro	LINEAR	ERI	1.9 km	MPC · JPL
193841	2001 QJ_{63}	—	August 16, 2001	Socorro	LINEAR	NYS	2.0 km	MPC · JPL
193842	2001 QX_{67}	—	August 19, 2001	Socorro	LINEAR	·	1.1 km	MPC · JPL
193843	2001 QU_{72}	—	August 20, 2001	Palomar	NEAT	·	1.6 km	MPC · JPL
193844	2001 QR_{81}	—	August 17, 2001	Socorro	LINEAR	·	1.8 km	MPC · JPL
193845	2001 QL_{100}	—	August 21, 2001	Palomar	NEAT	·	930 m	MPC · JPL
193846	2001 QZ_{103}	—	August 20, 2001	Socorro	LINEAR	·	1.5 km	MPC · JPL
193847	2001 QG_{109}	—	August 20, 2001	Palomar	NEAT	·	1.2 km	MPC · JPL
193848	2001 QL_{109}	—	August 20, 2001	Haleakala	NEAT	·	930 m	MPC · JPL
193849	2001 QK_{111}	—	August 26, 2001	Eskridge	Farpoint	·	1.3 km	MPC · JPL
193850	2001 QT_{112}	—	August 25, 2001	Socorro	LINEAR	·	1.4 km	MPC · JPL
193851	2001 QM_{114}	—	August 17, 2001	Socorro	LINEAR	·	1.2 km	MPC · JPL
193852	2001 QS_{114}	—	August 17, 2001	Socorro	LINEAR	·	1.1 km	MPC · JPL
193853	2001 QY_{115}	—	August 17, 2001	Socorro	LINEAR	·	1.3 km	MPC · JPL
193854	2001 QH_{117}	—	August 17, 2001	Socorro	LINEAR	V	1.2 km	MPC · JPL
193855	2001 QZ_{120}	—	August 19, 2001	Socorro	LINEAR	·	1.1 km	MPC · JPL
193856	2001 QX_{123}	—	August 19, 2001	Socorro	LINEAR	·	1.1 km	MPC · JPL
193857	2001 QY_{125}	—	August 19, 2001	Socorro	LINEAR	·	900 m	MPC · JPL
193858	2001 QD_{127}	—	August 20, 2001	Socorro	LINEAR	·	1.1 km	MPC · JPL
193859	2001 QZ_{128}	—	August 20, 2001	Socorro	LINEAR	·	1.2 km	MPC · JPL
193860	2001 QT_{133}	—	August 21, 2001	Socorro	LINEAR	·	1.2 km	MPC · JPL
193861	2001 QD_{137}	—	August 22, 2001	Socorro	LINEAR	·	2.3 km	MPC · JPL
193862	2001 QK_{141}	—	August 24, 2001	Socorro	LINEAR	TIR	5.4 km	MPC · JPL
193863	2001 QY_{141}	—	August 24, 2001	Socorro	LINEAR	·	2.5 km	MPC · JPL
193864	2001 QA_{142}	—	August 24, 2001	Socorro	LINEAR	·	1.7 km	MPC · JPL
193865	2001 QS_{142}	—	August 24, 2001	Goodricke-Pigott	R. A. Tucker	V	780 m	MPC · JPL
193866	2001 QC_{143}	—	August 21, 2001	Kitt Peak	Spacewatch	NYS	1.1 km	MPC · JPL
193867	2001 QO_{145}	—	August 24, 2001	Kitt Peak	Spacewatch	·	1.1 km	MPC · JPL
193868	2001 QC_{149}	—	August 21, 2001	Haleakala	NEAT	·	980 m	MPC · JPL
193869	2001 QD_{153}	—	August 26, 2001	Desert Eagle	W. K. Y. Yeung	·	1.1 km	MPC · JPL
193870	2001 QF_{154}	—	August 29, 2001	Ondřejov	M. Wolf, L. Kotková	·	980 m	MPC · JPL
193871	2001 QA_{156}	—	August 23, 2001	Anderson Mesa	LONEOS	·	1.2 km	MPC · JPL
193872	2001 QO_{156}	—	August 23, 2001	Anderson Mesa	LONEOS	·	1.1 km	MPC · JPL
193873	2001 QX_{157}	—	August 23, 2001	Anderson Mesa	LONEOS	·	1.1 km	MPC · JPL
193874	2001 QA_{161}	—	August 23, 2001	Anderson Mesa	LONEOS	·	1.0 km	MPC · JPL
193875	2001 QW_{161}	—	August 23, 2001	Anderson Mesa	LONEOS	NYS	1.1 km	MPC · JPL
193876	2001 QW_{166}	—	August 24, 2001	Haleakala	NEAT	·	1.1 km	MPC · JPL
193877	2001 QF_{174}	—	August 26, 2001	Socorro	LINEAR	·	1.4 km	MPC · JPL
193878	2001 QT_{178}	—	August 27, 2001	Palomar	NEAT	·	1.3 km	MPC · JPL
193879	2001 QQ_{179}	—	August 25, 2001	Palomar	NEAT	·	870 m	MPC · JPL
193880	2001 QE_{180}	—	August 25, 2001	Palomar	NEAT	·	1.3 km	MPC · JPL
193881	2001 QT_{180}	—	August 26, 2001	Palomar	NEAT	·	1.2 km	MPC · JPL
193882	2001 QW_{182}	—	August 17, 2001	Palomar	NEAT	PHO	3.8 km	MPC · JPL
193883	2001 QC_{183}	—	August 27, 2001	Palomar	NEAT	·	2.1 km	MPC · JPL
193884	2001 QZ_{186}	—	August 21, 2001	Desert Eagle	W. K. Y. Yeung	·	1.3 km	MPC · JPL
193885	2001 QN_{201}	—	August 22, 2001	Kitt Peak	Spacewatch	·	1.0 km	MPC · JPL
193886	2001 QO_{202}	—	August 23, 2001	Anderson Mesa	LONEOS	·	960 m	MPC · JPL
193887	2001 QO_{203}	—	August 23, 2001	Socorro	LINEAR	·	3.1 km	MPC · JPL
193888	2001 QL_{206}	—	August 23, 2001	Anderson Mesa	LONEOS	·	870 m	MPC · JPL
193889	2001 QW_{208}	—	August 23, 2001	Anderson Mesa	LONEOS	·	950 m	MPC · JPL
193890	2001 QK_{215}	—	August 23, 2001	Anderson Mesa	LONEOS	·	1.2 km	MPC · JPL
193891	2001 QM_{215}	—	August 23, 2001	Anderson Mesa	LONEOS	·	990 m	MPC · JPL
193892	2001 QZ_{215}	—	August 23, 2001	Anderson Mesa	LONEOS	NYS	1.5 km	MPC · JPL
193893	2001 QF_{218}	—	August 23, 2001	Anderson Mesa	LONEOS	·	1.5 km	MPC · JPL
193894	2001 QH_{225}	—	August 24, 2001	Desert Eagle	W. K. Y. Yeung	·	1.2 km	MPC · JPL
193895	2001 QJ_{226}	—	August 24, 2001	Anderson Mesa	LONEOS	(2076)	1.5 km	MPC · JPL
193896	2001 QX_{229}	—	August 24, 2001	Anderson Mesa	LONEOS	·	1.4 km	MPC · JPL
193897	2001 QF_{230}	—	August 24, 2001	Anderson Mesa	LONEOS	LIX	7.2 km	MPC · JPL
193898	2001 QK_{230}	—	August 24, 2001	Anderson Mesa	LONEOS	·	1.3 km	MPC · JPL
193899	2001 QY_{230}	—	August 24, 2001	Anderson Mesa	LONEOS	CYB	5.7 km	MPC · JPL
193900	2001 QE_{234}	—	August 24, 2001	Socorro	LINEAR	·	1.4 km	MPC · JPL

== 193901–194000 ==
back to top

Designation			Discovery			Properties		Ref
Permanent	Provisional	Named after	Date	Site	Discoverer(s)	Category	Diam.	Ref
193901	2001 QZ_{237}	—	August 24, 2001	Socorro	LINEAR	·	2.8 km	MPC · JPL
193902	2001 QJ_{242}	—	August 24, 2001	Socorro	LINEAR	·	3.2 km	MPC · JPL
193903	2001 QC_{245}	—	August 24, 2001	Socorro	LINEAR	·	1.0 km	MPC · JPL
193904	2001 QB_{247}	—	August 24, 2001	Socorro	LINEAR	·	2.3 km	MPC · JPL
193905	2001 QN_{247}	—	August 24, 2001	Socorro	LINEAR	·	1.5 km	MPC · JPL
193906	2001 QP_{247}	—	August 24, 2001	Socorro	LINEAR	·	1.6 km	MPC · JPL
193907	2001 QT_{247}	—	August 24, 2001	Socorro	LINEAR	·	990 m	MPC · JPL
193908	2001 QR_{248}	—	August 24, 2001	Socorro	LINEAR	·	1.4 km	MPC · JPL
193909	2001 QH_{249}	—	August 24, 2001	Socorro	LINEAR	NYS	1.2 km	MPC · JPL
193910	2001 QY_{249}	—	August 24, 2001	Haleakala	NEAT	·	1.2 km	MPC · JPL
193911	2001 QW_{252}	—	August 25, 2001	Socorro	LINEAR	·	1.2 km	MPC · JPL
193912	2001 QT_{255}	—	August 25, 2001	Socorro	LINEAR	·	1.2 km	MPC · JPL
193913	2001 QV_{255}	—	August 25, 2001	Socorro	LINEAR	V	1.0 km	MPC · JPL
193914	2001 QA_{261}	—	August 25, 2001	Socorro	LINEAR	·	1.2 km	MPC · JPL
193915	2001 QE_{268}	—	August 20, 2001	Socorro	LINEAR	·	1.3 km	MPC · JPL
193916	2001 QF_{270}	—	August 19, 2001	Socorro	LINEAR	·	890 m	MPC · JPL
193917	2001 QF_{273}	—	August 19, 2001	Socorro	LINEAR	·	1.3 km	MPC · JPL
193918	2001 QH_{276}	—	August 19, 2001	Socorro	LINEAR	(2076)	1.3 km	MPC · JPL
193919	2001 QS_{278}	—	August 19, 2001	Socorro	LINEAR	·	1.0 km	MPC · JPL
193920	2001 QO_{284}	—	August 30, 2001	Palomar	NEAT	·	1.1 km	MPC · JPL
193921	2001 QE_{287}	—	August 17, 2001	Socorro	LINEAR	·	3.6 km	MPC · JPL
193922	2001 QC_{288}	—	August 17, 2001	Socorro	LINEAR	V	950 m	MPC · JPL
193923	2001 QY_{291}	—	August 16, 2001	Socorro	LINEAR	·	1.3 km	MPC · JPL
193924	2001 QR_{293}	—	August 28, 2001	Bergisch Gladbach	W. Bickel	·	920 m	MPC · JPL
193925	2001 QC_{330}	—	August 25, 2001	Anderson Mesa	LONEOS	·	2.5 km	MPC · JPL
193926	2001 RW_{2}	—	September 9, 2001	Desert Eagle	W. K. Y. Yeung	·	1.1 km	MPC · JPL
193927	2001 RQ_{5}	—	September 9, 2001	Desert Eagle	W. K. Y. Yeung	·	1.0 km	MPC · JPL
193928	2001 RJ_{15}	—	September 10, 2001	Socorro	LINEAR	·	1.2 km	MPC · JPL
193929	2001 RF_{21}	—	September 7, 2001	Socorro	LINEAR	·	960 m	MPC · JPL
193930	2001 RF_{22}	—	September 7, 2001	Socorro	LINEAR	MAS	890 m	MPC · JPL
193931	2001 RM_{25}	—	September 7, 2001	Socorro	LINEAR	·	1.3 km	MPC · JPL
193932	2001 RO_{25}	—	September 7, 2001	Socorro	LINEAR	V	870 m	MPC · JPL
193933	2001 RR_{25}	—	September 7, 2001	Socorro	LINEAR	·	1.1 km	MPC · JPL
193934	2001 RW_{27}	—	September 7, 2001	Socorro	LINEAR	·	1.2 km	MPC · JPL
193935	2001 RX_{27}	—	September 7, 2001	Socorro	LINEAR	·	730 m	MPC · JPL
193936	2001 RG_{28}	—	September 7, 2001	Socorro	LINEAR	·	990 m	MPC · JPL
193937	2001 RT_{28}	—	September 7, 2001	Socorro	LINEAR	·	790 m	MPC · JPL
193938	2001 RU_{30}	—	September 7, 2001	Socorro	LINEAR	NYS	2.5 km	MPC · JPL
193939	2001 RL_{32}	—	September 8, 2001	Socorro	LINEAR	V	800 m	MPC · JPL
193940	2001 RC_{34}	—	September 8, 2001	Socorro	LINEAR	·	760 m	MPC · JPL
193941	2001 RV_{34}	—	September 8, 2001	Socorro	LINEAR	·	1.2 km	MPC · JPL
193942	2001 RQ_{36}	—	September 8, 2001	Socorro	LINEAR	·	1.2 km	MPC · JPL
193943	2001 RV_{37}	—	September 8, 2001	Socorro	LINEAR	·	5.5 km	MPC · JPL
193944	2001 RY_{38}	—	September 9, 2001	Socorro	LINEAR	·	1.1 km	MPC · JPL
193945	2001 RT_{42}	—	September 11, 2001	Socorro	LINEAR	·	860 m	MPC · JPL
193946	2001 RH_{43}	—	September 11, 2001	Oakley	Oakley	·	850 m	MPC · JPL
193947	2001 RA_{46}	—	September 15, 2001	Emerald Lane	L. Ball	·	1.4 km	MPC · JPL
193948	2001 RQ_{47}	—	September 12, 2001	Socorro	LINEAR	·	1.6 km	MPC · JPL
193949	2001 RM_{52}	—	September 12, 2001	Socorro	LINEAR	·	1.2 km	MPC · JPL
193950	2001 RP_{56}	—	September 12, 2001	Socorro	LINEAR	·	900 m	MPC · JPL
193951	2001 RK_{58}	—	September 12, 2001	Socorro	LINEAR	·	4.7 km	MPC · JPL
193952	2001 RH_{62}	—	September 12, 2001	Socorro	LINEAR	·	920 m	MPC · JPL
193953	2001 RP_{64}	—	September 10, 2001	Socorro	LINEAR	·	1.6 km	MPC · JPL
193954	2001 RW_{65}	—	September 10, 2001	Socorro	LINEAR	·	1.6 km	MPC · JPL
193955	2001 RC_{68}	—	September 10, 2001	Socorro	LINEAR	·	1.2 km	MPC · JPL
193956	2001 RU_{68}	—	September 10, 2001	Socorro	LINEAR	·	1.4 km	MPC · JPL
193957	2001 RX_{72}	—	September 10, 2001	Socorro	LINEAR	V	1.0 km	MPC · JPL
193958	2001 RH_{74}	—	September 10, 2001	Socorro	LINEAR	·	1.8 km	MPC · JPL
193959	2001 RL_{80}	—	September 13, 2001	Palomar	NEAT	·	1.2 km	MPC · JPL
193960	2001 RG_{81}	—	September 14, 2001	Palomar	NEAT	·	1.8 km	MPC · JPL
193961	2001 RE_{83}	—	September 11, 2001	Anderson Mesa	LONEOS	·	1.4 km	MPC · JPL
193962	2001 RK_{86}	—	September 11, 2001	Anderson Mesa	LONEOS	·	830 m	MPC · JPL
193963	2001 RM_{88}	—	September 11, 2001	Anderson Mesa	LONEOS	·	1.1 km	MPC · JPL
193964	2001 RD_{90}	—	September 11, 2001	Anderson Mesa	LONEOS	slow	780 m	MPC · JPL
193965	2001 RE_{90}	—	September 11, 2001	Anderson Mesa	LONEOS	·	910 m	MPC · JPL
193966	2001 RA_{92}	—	September 11, 2001	Anderson Mesa	LONEOS	·	1.1 km	MPC · JPL
193967	2001 RC_{93}	—	September 11, 2001	Anderson Mesa	LONEOS	·	1.1 km	MPC · JPL
193968	2001 RV_{93}	—	September 11, 2001	Anderson Mesa	LONEOS	·	1.3 km	MPC · JPL
193969	2001 RY_{94}	—	September 11, 2001	Anderson Mesa	LONEOS	V	1.2 km	MPC · JPL
193970	2001 RW_{98}	—	September 12, 2001	Socorro	LINEAR	·	980 m	MPC · JPL
193971	2001 RW_{99}	—	September 12, 2001	Socorro	LINEAR	·	970 m	MPC · JPL
193972	2001 RD_{102}	—	September 12, 2001	Socorro	LINEAR	·	990 m	MPC · JPL
193973	2001 RA_{103}	—	September 12, 2001	Socorro	LINEAR	·	820 m	MPC · JPL
193974	2001 RW_{104}	—	September 12, 2001	Socorro	LINEAR	·	1.0 km	MPC · JPL
193975	2001 RQ_{106}	—	September 12, 2001	Socorro	LINEAR	·	800 m	MPC · JPL
193976	2001 RV_{116}	—	September 12, 2001	Socorro	LINEAR	·	1.3 km	MPC · JPL
193977	2001 RG_{120}	—	September 12, 2001	Socorro	LINEAR	·	1.3 km	MPC · JPL
193978	2001 RD_{121}	—	September 12, 2001	Socorro	LINEAR	·	960 m	MPC · JPL
193979	2001 RK_{124}	—	September 12, 2001	Socorro	LINEAR	·	1.1 km	MPC · JPL
193980	2001 RL_{125}	—	September 12, 2001	Socorro	LINEAR	·	1.3 km	MPC · JPL
193981	2001 RB_{126}	—	September 12, 2001	Socorro	LINEAR	·	1.0 km	MPC · JPL
193982	2001 RK_{126}	—	September 12, 2001	Socorro	LINEAR	·	950 m	MPC · JPL
193983	2001 RE_{127}	—	September 12, 2001	Socorro	LINEAR	·	950 m	MPC · JPL
193984	2001 RU_{130}	—	September 12, 2001	Socorro	LINEAR	·	1.2 km	MPC · JPL
193985	2001 RQ_{132}	—	September 12, 2001	Socorro	LINEAR	·	5.2 km	MPC · JPL
193986	2001 RC_{134}	—	September 12, 2001	Socorro	LINEAR	·	1.5 km	MPC · JPL
193987	2001 RZ_{135}	—	September 12, 2001	Socorro	LINEAR	·	1.1 km	MPC · JPL
193988	2001 RC_{137}	—	September 12, 2001	Socorro	LINEAR	·	1.3 km	MPC · JPL
193989	2001 RC_{141}	—	September 12, 2001	Socorro	LINEAR	·	1.2 km	MPC · JPL
193990	2001 RQ_{147}	—	September 9, 2001	Haleakala	NEAT	slow	1.2 km	MPC · JPL
193991	2001 RA_{149}	—	September 10, 2001	Anderson Mesa	LONEOS	·	1.5 km	MPC · JPL
193992	2001 RJ_{149}	—	September 10, 2001	Socorro	LINEAR	·	1.8 km	MPC · JPL
193993	2001 RX_{150}	—	September 11, 2001	Anderson Mesa	LONEOS	·	1.4 km	MPC · JPL
193994	2001 RE_{151}	—	September 11, 2001	Anderson Mesa	LONEOS	·	1.3 km	MPC · JPL
193995	2001 RK_{151}	—	September 11, 2001	Anderson Mesa	LONEOS	·	1.5 km	MPC · JPL
193996	2001 RE_{152}	—	September 11, 2001	Anderson Mesa	LONEOS	·	1.3 km	MPC · JPL
193997	2001 RM_{152}	—	September 11, 2001	Anderson Mesa	LONEOS	·	840 m	MPC · JPL
193998	2001 RP_{152}	—	September 11, 2001	Anderson Mesa	LONEOS	·	1.3 km	MPC · JPL
193999	2001 RO_{153}	—	September 13, 2001	Nashville	Clingan, R.	·	6.2 km	MPC · JPL
194000	2001 RC_{154}	—	September 15, 2001	Palomar	NEAT	·	7.4 km	MPC · JPL

back to top

== See also ==
- Meanings of minor-planet names: 193001–194000
