= List of minor planets: 195001–196000 =

The following is a partial list of minor planets, running from minor-planet number 195001 through 196000, inclusive. The primary data for this and other partial lists is based on JPL's "Small-Body Orbital Elements" and data available from the Minor Planet Center. Critical list information is also provided by the MPC, unless otherwise specified from Lowell Observatory. A detailed description of the table's columns and additional sources are given on the main page including a complete list of every page in this series, and a statistical break-up on the dynamical classification of minor planets.

Also see the summary list of all named bodies in numerical and alphabetical order, and the corresponding naming citations for the number range of this particular list. New namings may only be added to this list after official publication, as the preannouncement of names is condemned by the Working Group for Small Bodies Nomenclature of the International Astronomical Union.

Near-Earth obj.	MBA (inner)	MBA (outer)	Centaur
Mars-crosser	MBA (middle)	Jupiter trojan	Trans-Neptunian obj.
Unclassified

== 195001–195100 ==
Designation			Discovery			Properties		Ref
Permanent	Provisional	Named after	Date	Site	Discoverer(s)	Category	Diam.	Ref
195001	2002 BA_{28}	—	January 20, 2002	Anderson Mesa	LONEOS	·	1.7 km	MPC · JPL
195002	2002 BS_{28}	—	January 19, 2002	Anderson Mesa	LONEOS	·	1.9 km	MPC · JPL
195003	2002 BA_{29}	—	January 20, 2002	Anderson Mesa	LONEOS	·	2.0 km	MPC · JPL
195004	2002 CX_{3}	—	February 3, 2002	Palomar	NEAT	·	2.4 km	MPC · JPL
195005	2002 CA_{4}	—	February 3, 2002	Palomar	NEAT	·	1.8 km	MPC · JPL
195006	2002 CW_{5}	—	February 4, 2002	Haleakala	NEAT	·	1.8 km	MPC · JPL
195007	2002 CW_{7}	—	February 6, 2002	Desert Eagle	W. K. Y. Yeung	MAS	1.1 km	MPC · JPL
195008	2002 CQ_{12}	—	February 5, 2002	Črni Vrh	Mikuž, H.	·	3.1 km	MPC · JPL
195009	2002 CK_{13}	—	February 8, 2002	Fountain Hills	C. W. Juels, P. R. Holvorcem	·	2.8 km	MPC · JPL
195010	2002 CF_{15}	—	February 9, 2002	Desert Eagle	W. K. Y. Yeung	·	2.6 km	MPC · JPL
195011	2002 CB_{16}	—	February 10, 2002	Desert Eagle	W. K. Y. Yeung	·	2.2 km	MPC · JPL
195012	2002 CF_{17}	—	February 6, 2002	Socorro	LINEAR	V	980 m	MPC · JPL
195013	2002 CL_{17}	—	February 6, 2002	Socorro	LINEAR	NYS	2.1 km	MPC · JPL
195014	2002 CM_{18}	—	February 6, 2002	Socorro	LINEAR	·	2.1 km	MPC · JPL
195015	2002 CR_{21}	—	February 5, 2002	Palomar	NEAT	·	1.6 km	MPC · JPL
195016	2002 CU_{21}	—	February 5, 2002	Palomar	NEAT	MAS	1.0 km	MPC · JPL
195017	2002 CW_{22}	—	February 5, 2002	Palomar	NEAT	(5)	1.6 km	MPC · JPL
195018	2002 CW_{23}	—	February 6, 2002	Palomar	NEAT	·	1.4 km	MPC · JPL
195019	2002 CX_{26}	—	February 6, 2002	Socorro	LINEAR	·	2.4 km	MPC · JPL
195020	2002 CE_{27}	—	February 6, 2002	Socorro	LINEAR	·	1.6 km	MPC · JPL
195021	2002 CG_{27}	—	February 6, 2002	Socorro	LINEAR	·	1.8 km	MPC · JPL
195022	2002 CZ_{27}	—	February 6, 2002	Socorro	LINEAR	(194)	3.3 km	MPC · JPL
195023	2002 CO_{28}	—	February 6, 2002	Socorro	LINEAR	·	2.5 km	MPC · JPL
195024	2002 CK_{31}	—	February 6, 2002	Socorro	LINEAR	·	2.3 km	MPC · JPL
195025	2002 CL_{31}	—	February 6, 2002	Socorro	LINEAR	·	1.8 km	MPC · JPL
195026	2002 CY_{36}	—	February 7, 2002	Socorro	LINEAR	·	1.6 km	MPC · JPL
195027	2002 CJ_{39}	—	February 11, 2002	Desert Eagle	W. K. Y. Yeung	·	1.2 km	MPC · JPL
195028	2002 CD_{40}	—	February 5, 2002	Haleakala	NEAT	·	2.5 km	MPC · JPL
195029	2002 CD_{41}	—	February 7, 2002	Palomar	NEAT	·	1.7 km	MPC · JPL
195030	2002 CP_{44}	—	February 6, 2002	Kitt Peak	Spacewatch	MAS	940 m	MPC · JPL
195031	2002 CE_{46}	—	February 8, 2002	Palomar	NEAT	·	2.8 km	MPC · JPL
195032	2002 CO_{50}	—	February 12, 2002	Desert Eagle	W. K. Y. Yeung	MAS	1.0 km	MPC · JPL
195033	2002 CP_{50}	—	February 12, 2002	Desert Eagle	W. K. Y. Yeung	·	2.0 km	MPC · JPL
195034	2002 CK_{53}	—	February 7, 2002	Socorro	LINEAR	(5)	1.8 km	MPC · JPL
195035	2002 CL_{53}	—	February 7, 2002	Socorro	LINEAR	·	2.3 km	MPC · JPL
195036	2002 CO_{54}	—	February 7, 2002	Socorro	LINEAR	·	1.8 km	MPC · JPL
195037	2002 CF_{55}	—	February 7, 2002	Socorro	LINEAR	NYS	2.3 km	MPC · JPL
195038	2002 CL_{55}	—	February 7, 2002	Socorro	LINEAR	(5)	1.5 km	MPC · JPL
195039	2002 CA_{58}	—	February 7, 2002	Kitt Peak	Spacewatch	NYS	1.5 km	MPC · JPL
195040	2002 CR_{58}	—	February 12, 2002	Desert Eagle	W. K. Y. Yeung	MAS	840 m	MPC · JPL
195041	2002 CV_{58}	—	February 10, 2002	Socorro	LINEAR	L4	10 km	MPC · JPL
195042	2002 CM_{60}	—	February 6, 2002	Socorro	LINEAR	·	1.4 km	MPC · JPL
195043	2002 CP_{61}	—	February 6, 2002	Socorro	LINEAR	·	2.1 km	MPC · JPL
195044	2002 CX_{65}	—	February 6, 2002	Socorro	LINEAR	·	2.0 km	MPC · JPL
195045	2002 CU_{66}	—	February 7, 2002	Socorro	LINEAR	NYS	1.4 km	MPC · JPL
195046	2002 CS_{68}	—	February 7, 2002	Socorro	LINEAR	·	1.6 km	MPC · JPL
195047	2002 CF_{69}	—	February 7, 2002	Socorro	LINEAR	MAS	920 m	MPC · JPL
195048	2002 CW_{70}	—	February 7, 2002	Socorro	LINEAR	·	2.0 km	MPC · JPL
195049	2002 CL_{71}	—	February 7, 2002	Socorro	LINEAR	MAS	1.0 km	MPC · JPL
195050	2002 CH_{72}	—	February 7, 2002	Socorro	LINEAR	·	1.3 km	MPC · JPL
195051	2002 CB_{73}	—	February 7, 2002	Socorro	LINEAR	·	2.6 km	MPC · JPL
195052	2002 CJ_{73}	—	February 7, 2002	Socorro	LINEAR	·	2.5 km	MPC · JPL
195053	2002 CE_{74}	—	February 7, 2002	Socorro	LINEAR	EUN	2.2 km	MPC · JPL
195054	2002 CZ_{74}	—	February 7, 2002	Socorro	LINEAR	MAS	950 m	MPC · JPL
195055	2002 CU_{76}	—	February 7, 2002	Socorro	LINEAR	·	1.4 km	MPC · JPL
195056	2002 CN_{80}	—	February 7, 2002	Socorro	LINEAR	L4	10 km	MPC · JPL
195057	2002 CY_{80}	—	February 7, 2002	Socorro	LINEAR	·	1.5 km	MPC · JPL
195058	2002 CK_{82}	—	February 7, 2002	Socorro	LINEAR	·	2.8 km	MPC · JPL
195059	2002 CZ_{82}	—	February 7, 2002	Socorro	LINEAR	·	1.9 km	MPC · JPL
195060	2002 CA_{84}	—	February 7, 2002	Socorro	LINEAR	MAS	940 m	MPC · JPL
195061	2002 CA_{86}	—	February 7, 2002	Socorro	LINEAR	·	1.5 km	MPC · JPL
195062	2002 CU_{86}	—	February 7, 2002	Socorro	LINEAR	·	1.6 km	MPC · JPL
195063	2002 CH_{87}	—	February 7, 2002	Socorro	LINEAR	·	1.7 km	MPC · JPL
195064	2002 CB_{88}	—	February 7, 2002	Socorro	LINEAR	·	2.1 km	MPC · JPL
195065	2002 CA_{91}	—	February 7, 2002	Socorro	LINEAR	·	1.9 km	MPC · JPL
195066	2002 CK_{91}	—	February 7, 2002	Socorro	LINEAR	·	1.4 km	MPC · JPL
195067	2002 CY_{91}	—	February 7, 2002	Socorro	LINEAR	ERI	3.0 km	MPC · JPL
195068	2002 CY_{94}	—	February 7, 2002	Socorro	LINEAR	·	1.8 km	MPC · JPL
195069	2002 CN_{95}	—	February 7, 2002	Socorro	LINEAR	·	2.4 km	MPC · JPL
195070	2002 CJ_{96}	—	February 7, 2002	Socorro	LINEAR	NYS	2.3 km	MPC · JPL
195071	2002 CV_{96}	—	February 7, 2002	Socorro	LINEAR	·	1.7 km	MPC · JPL
195072	2002 CW_{97}	—	February 7, 2002	Socorro	LINEAR	·	2.1 km	MPC · JPL
195073	2002 CP_{99}	—	February 7, 2002	Socorro	LINEAR	·	1.9 km	MPC · JPL
195074	2002 CQ_{99}	—	February 7, 2002	Socorro	LINEAR	·	1.8 km	MPC · JPL
195075	2002 CH_{100}	—	February 7, 2002	Socorro	LINEAR	·	1.6 km	MPC · JPL
195076	2002 CC_{105}	—	February 7, 2002	Socorro	LINEAR	·	1.6 km	MPC · JPL
195077	2002 CR_{105}	—	February 7, 2002	Socorro	LINEAR	(5)	1.9 km	MPC · JPL
195078	2002 CV_{105}	—	February 7, 2002	Socorro	LINEAR	GEF	2.2 km	MPC · JPL
195079	2002 CL_{107}	—	February 7, 2002	Socorro	LINEAR	·	1.6 km	MPC · JPL
195080	2002 CX_{107}	—	February 7, 2002	Socorro	LINEAR	NYS	2.0 km	MPC · JPL
195081	2002 CY_{107}	—	February 7, 2002	Socorro	LINEAR	H	850 m	MPC · JPL
195082	2002 CC_{108}	—	February 7, 2002	Socorro	LINEAR	·	2.4 km	MPC · JPL
195083	2002 CD_{108}	—	February 7, 2002	Socorro	LINEAR	·	2.1 km	MPC · JPL
195084	2002 CL_{109}	—	February 7, 2002	Socorro	LINEAR	L4	10 km	MPC · JPL
195085	2002 CM_{109}	—	February 7, 2002	Socorro	LINEAR	·	2.3 km	MPC · JPL
195086	2002 CO_{109}	—	February 7, 2002	Socorro	LINEAR	·	1.6 km	MPC · JPL
195087	2002 CB_{112}	—	February 7, 2002	Socorro	LINEAR	HNS	2.7 km	MPC · JPL
195088	2002 CW_{112}	—	February 8, 2002	Socorro	LINEAR	·	1.8 km	MPC · JPL
195089	2002 CP_{115}	—	February 8, 2002	Needville	Needville	·	1.8 km	MPC · JPL
195090	2002 CL_{116}	—	February 15, 2002	Uccle	E. W. Elst, H. Debehogne	·	3.5 km	MPC · JPL
195091	2002 CH_{118}	—	February 14, 2002	Desert Eagle	W. K. Y. Yeung	·	1.4 km	MPC · JPL
195092	2002 CN_{118}	—	February 7, 2002	Kitt Peak	Spacewatch	MAS	1.1 km	MPC · JPL
195093	2002 CZ_{118}	—	February 7, 2002	Socorro	LINEAR	·	2.0 km	MPC · JPL
195094	2002 CR_{119}	—	February 7, 2002	Socorro	LINEAR	·	1.7 km	MPC · JPL
195095	2002 CG_{121}	—	February 7, 2002	Socorro	LINEAR	·	1.4 km	MPC · JPL
195096	2002 CU_{124}	—	February 7, 2002	Socorro	LINEAR	·	2.2 km	MPC · JPL
195097	2002 CW_{124}	—	February 7, 2002	Socorro	LINEAR	NYS	1.5 km	MPC · JPL
195098	2002 CE_{125}	—	February 7, 2002	Socorro	LINEAR	·	1.7 km	MPC · JPL
195099	2002 CF_{126}	—	February 7, 2002	Socorro	LINEAR	·	4.4 km	MPC · JPL
195100	2002 CX_{128}	—	February 7, 2002	Socorro	LINEAR	·	2.6 km	MPC · JPL

== 195101–195200 ==
back to top

Designation			Discovery			Properties		Ref
Permanent	Provisional	Named after	Date	Site	Discoverer(s)	Category	Diam.	Ref
195101	2002 CY_{129}	—	February 7, 2002	Socorro	LINEAR	·	1.8 km	MPC · JPL
195102	2002 CB_{130}	—	February 7, 2002	Socorro	LINEAR	·	2.3 km	MPC · JPL
195103	2002 CE_{130}	—	February 7, 2002	Socorro	LINEAR	MAS	950 m	MPC · JPL
195104	2002 CN_{130}	—	February 7, 2002	Socorro	LINEAR	L4	20 km	MPC · JPL
195105	2002 CC_{132}	—	February 7, 2002	Socorro	LINEAR	·	1.7 km	MPC · JPL
195106	2002 CN_{132}	—	February 7, 2002	Socorro	LINEAR	·	3.1 km	MPC · JPL
195107	2002 CL_{133}	—	February 7, 2002	Socorro	LINEAR	NYS	1.6 km	MPC · JPL
195108	2002 CN_{135}	—	February 8, 2002	Socorro	LINEAR	·	2.5 km	MPC · JPL
195109	2002 CN_{136}	—	February 8, 2002	Socorro	LINEAR	·	2.3 km	MPC · JPL
195110	2002 CN_{137}	—	February 8, 2002	Socorro	LINEAR	·	2.4 km	MPC · JPL
195111	2002 CQ_{137}	—	February 8, 2002	Socorro	LINEAR	·	1.8 km	MPC · JPL
195112	2002 CU_{137}	—	February 8, 2002	Socorro	LINEAR	ERI	1.9 km	MPC · JPL
195113	2002 CF_{139}	—	February 8, 2002	Socorro	LINEAR	·	1.7 km	MPC · JPL
195114	2002 CU_{139}	—	February 8, 2002	Socorro	LINEAR	(5)	1.8 km	MPC · JPL
195115	2002 CW_{140}	—	February 8, 2002	Socorro	LINEAR	·	1.9 km	MPC · JPL
195116	2002 CD_{143}	—	February 9, 2002	Socorro	LINEAR	·	1.9 km	MPC · JPL
195117	2002 CT_{143}	—	February 9, 2002	Socorro	LINEAR	L4	10 km	MPC · JPL
195118	2002 CP_{144}	—	February 9, 2002	Socorro	LINEAR	NYS	1.9 km	MPC · JPL
195119	2002 CH_{145}	—	February 9, 2002	Socorro	LINEAR	·	1.7 km	MPC · JPL
195120	2002 CG_{146}	—	February 9, 2002	Socorro	LINEAR	·	3.9 km	MPC · JPL
195121	2002 CB_{154}	—	February 9, 2002	Kitt Peak	Spacewatch	·	3.1 km	MPC · JPL
195122	2002 CZ_{156}	—	February 7, 2002	Socorro	LINEAR	NYS	2.1 km	MPC · JPL
195123	2002 CG_{157}	—	February 7, 2002	Socorro	LINEAR	·	2.1 km	MPC · JPL
195124	2002 CW_{157}	—	February 7, 2002	Socorro	LINEAR	·	2.2 km	MPC · JPL
195125	2002 CX_{158}	—	February 7, 2002	Socorro	LINEAR	NYS	1.5 km	MPC · JPL
195126	2002 CY_{158}	—	February 7, 2002	Socorro	LINEAR	L4	10 km	MPC · JPL
195127	2002 CZ_{158}	—	February 7, 2002	Socorro	LINEAR	·	3.2 km	MPC · JPL
195128	2002 CH_{159}	—	February 7, 2002	Socorro	LINEAR	NYS	1.9 km	MPC · JPL
195129	2002 CJ_{159}	—	February 7, 2002	Socorro	LINEAR	·	2.5 km	MPC · JPL
195130	2002 CY_{159}	—	February 8, 2002	Socorro	LINEAR	·	1.5 km	MPC · JPL
195131	2002 CP_{163}	—	February 8, 2002	Socorro	LINEAR	·	4.1 km	MPC · JPL
195132	2002 CT_{163}	—	February 8, 2002	Socorro	LINEAR	·	3.7 km	MPC · JPL
195133	2002 CO_{168}	—	February 8, 2002	Socorro	LINEAR	·	3.1 km	MPC · JPL
195134	2002 CR_{168}	—	February 8, 2002	Socorro	LINEAR	·	1.7 km	MPC · JPL
195135	2002 CE_{171}	—	February 8, 2002	Socorro	LINEAR	·	2.5 km	MPC · JPL
195136	2002 CK_{172}	—	February 8, 2002	Socorro	LINEAR	·	1.9 km	MPC · JPL
195137	2002 CA_{177}	—	February 10, 2002	Socorro	LINEAR	MAS	1.3 km	MPC · JPL
195138	2002 CG_{179}	—	February 10, 2002	Socorro	LINEAR	(5)	1.5 km	MPC · JPL
195139	2002 CH_{181}	—	February 10, 2002	Socorro	LINEAR	NYS	1.4 km	MPC · JPL
195140	2002 CP_{187}	—	February 10, 2002	Socorro	LINEAR	NYS	1.6 km	MPC · JPL
195141	2002 CN_{189}	—	February 10, 2002	Socorro	LINEAR	·	1.6 km	MPC · JPL
195142	2002 CM_{192}	—	February 10, 2002	Socorro	LINEAR	·	1.5 km	MPC · JPL
195143	2002 CS_{194}	—	February 10, 2002	Socorro	LINEAR	fast	1.6 km	MPC · JPL
195144	2002 CZ_{199}	—	February 10, 2002	Socorro	LINEAR	·	1.5 km	MPC · JPL
195145	2002 CX_{200}	—	February 10, 2002	Socorro	LINEAR	MAS	1.0 km	MPC · JPL
195146	2002 CS_{201}	—	February 10, 2002	Socorro	LINEAR	MAR	2.2 km	MPC · JPL
195147	2002 CX_{201}	—	February 10, 2002	Socorro	LINEAR	·	1.8 km	MPC · JPL
195148	2002 CM_{202}	—	February 10, 2002	Socorro	LINEAR	·	1.4 km	MPC · JPL
195149	2002 CW_{206}	—	February 10, 2002	Socorro	LINEAR	·	2.4 km	MPC · JPL
195150	2002 CA_{207}	—	February 10, 2002	Socorro	LINEAR	MAS	1.1 km	MPC · JPL
195151	2002 CQ_{208}	—	February 10, 2002	Socorro	LINEAR	·	1.6 km	MPC · JPL
195152	2002 CW_{210}	—	February 10, 2002	Socorro	LINEAR	L4	10 km	MPC · JPL
195153	2002 CG_{213}	—	February 10, 2002	Socorro	LINEAR	L4	14 km	MPC · JPL
195154	2002 CW_{215}	—	February 10, 2002	Socorro	LINEAR	·	3.1 km	MPC · JPL
195155	2002 CB_{216}	—	February 10, 2002	Socorro	LINEAR	·	1.4 km	MPC · JPL
195156	2002 CK_{217}	—	February 10, 2002	Socorro	LINEAR	·	1.8 km	MPC · JPL
195157	2002 CZ_{217}	—	February 10, 2002	Socorro	LINEAR	HNS	1.5 km	MPC · JPL
195158	2002 CG_{218}	—	February 10, 2002	Socorro	LINEAR	·	1.6 km	MPC · JPL
195159	2002 CY_{222}	—	February 11, 2002	Socorro	LINEAR	·	1.8 km	MPC · JPL
195160	2002 CE_{225}	—	February 14, 2002	Bergisch Gladbach	W. Bickel	EUN	1.9 km	MPC · JPL
195161	2002 CA_{226}	—	February 3, 2002	Haleakala	NEAT	·	3.2 km	MPC · JPL
195162	2002 CY_{226}	—	February 6, 2002	Palomar	NEAT	V	1.3 km	MPC · JPL
195163	2002 CR_{230}	—	February 12, 2002	Kitt Peak	Spacewatch	·	2.3 km	MPC · JPL
195164	2002 CJ_{233}	—	February 11, 2002	Socorro	LINEAR	·	2.0 km	MPC · JPL
195165	2002 CT_{234}	—	February 8, 2002	Kitt Peak	Spacewatch	KOR	1.5 km	MPC · JPL
195166	2002 CF_{235}	—	February 12, 2002	Kitt Peak	Spacewatch	·	1.8 km	MPC · JPL
195167	2002 CT_{235}	—	February 8, 2002	Socorro	LINEAR	L4	20 km	MPC · JPL
195168	2002 CB_{237}	—	February 10, 2002	Socorro	LINEAR	·	2.5 km	MPC · JPL
195169	2002 CN_{237}	—	February 10, 2002	Socorro	LINEAR	·	2.7 km	MPC · JPL
195170	2002 CF_{240}	—	February 11, 2002	Socorro	LINEAR	·	2.1 km	MPC · JPL
195171	2002 CE_{242}	—	February 11, 2002	Socorro	LINEAR	·	3.5 km	MPC · JPL
195172	2002 CN_{242}	—	February 11, 2002	Socorro	LINEAR	EUN	2.1 km	MPC · JPL
195173	2002 CZ_{243}	—	February 11, 2002	Socorro	LINEAR	·	1.6 km	MPC · JPL
195174	2002 CF_{244}	—	February 11, 2002	Socorro	LINEAR	·	3.0 km	MPC · JPL
195175	2002 CA_{246}	—	February 15, 2002	Haleakala	NEAT	EUN	2.2 km	MPC · JPL
195176	2002 CT_{248}	—	February 14, 2002	Haleakala	NEAT	ERI	3.3 km	MPC · JPL
195177	2002 CE_{250}	—	February 6, 2002	Kitt Peak	M. W. Buie	MIS	3.5 km	MPC · JPL
195178	2002 CS_{254}	—	February 6, 2002	Socorro	LINEAR	·	2.2 km	MPC · JPL
195179	2002 CR_{258}	—	February 6, 2002	Palomar	NEAT	·	2.3 km	MPC · JPL
195180	2002 CL_{263}	—	February 6, 2002	Kitt Peak	M. W. Buie	·	1.4 km	MPC · JPL
195181	2002 CQ_{263}	—	February 7, 2002	Palomar	NEAT	·	2.1 km	MPC · JPL
195182	2002 CX_{263}	—	February 7, 2002	Kitt Peak	M. W. Buie	·	1.1 km	MPC · JPL
195183	2002 CP_{266}	—	February 7, 2002	Palomar	NEAT	·	2.5 km	MPC · JPL
195184	2002 CP_{267}	—	February 7, 2002	Kitt Peak	Spacewatch	·	3.3 km	MPC · JPL
195185	2002 CM_{269}	—	February 7, 2002	Kitt Peak	M. W. Buie	NYS	2.2 km	MPC · JPL
195186	2002 CK_{272}	—	February 8, 2002	Anderson Mesa	LONEOS	·	2.3 km	MPC · JPL
195187	2002 CO_{273}	—	February 8, 2002	Kitt Peak	M. W. Buie	·	1.7 km	MPC · JPL
195188	2002 CS_{273}	—	February 8, 2002	Kitt Peak	Spacewatch	L4	13 km	MPC · JPL
195189	2002 CD_{274}	—	February 8, 2002	Kitt Peak	M. W. Buie	·	1.7 km	MPC · JPL
195190	2002 CR_{277}	—	February 7, 2002	Palomar	NEAT	·	2.0 km	MPC · JPL
195191 Constantinetsang	2002 CC_{281}	Constantinetsang	February 8, 2002	Kitt Peak	M. W. Buie	MAS	880 m	MPC · JPL
195192	2002 CN_{284}	—	February 9, 2002	Kitt Peak	Spacewatch	MAS	990 m	MPC · JPL
195193	2002 CO_{284}	—	February 9, 2002	Kitt Peak	Spacewatch	·	1.7 km	MPC · JPL
195194	2002 CF_{288}	—	February 9, 2002	Kitt Peak	Spacewatch	·	1.8 km	MPC · JPL
195195	2002 CN_{288}	—	February 10, 2002	Socorro	LINEAR	·	1.5 km	MPC · JPL
195196	2002 CB_{290}	—	February 10, 2002	Socorro	LINEAR	PHO	2.5 km	MPC · JPL
195197	2002 CG_{291}	—	February 10, 2002	Socorro	LINEAR	·	2.2 km	MPC · JPL
195198	2002 CH_{291}	—	February 10, 2002	Socorro	LINEAR	·	2.9 km	MPC · JPL
195199	2002 CL_{291}	—	February 10, 2002	Anderson Mesa	LONEOS	EUN	2.3 km	MPC · JPL
195200	2002 CA_{295}	—	February 10, 2002	Socorro	LINEAR	·	2.1 km	MPC · JPL

== 195201–195300 ==
back to top

Designation			Discovery			Properties		Ref
Permanent	Provisional	Named after	Date	Site	Discoverer(s)	Category	Diam.	Ref
195201	2002 CR_{296}	—	February 10, 2002	Socorro	LINEAR	·	1.9 km	MPC · JPL
195202	2002 CF_{301}	—	February 11, 2002	Socorro	LINEAR	·	2.9 km	MPC · JPL
195203	2002 CN_{301}	—	February 11, 2002	Socorro	LINEAR	·	2.4 km	MPC · JPL
195204	2002 CR_{306}	—	February 7, 2002	Socorro	LINEAR	HIL · 3:2	7.7 km	MPC · JPL
195205	2002 DH	—	February 16, 2002	Eskridge	G. Hug	H	660 m	MPC · JPL
195206	2002 DF_{1}	—	February 16, 2002	Uccle	T. Pauwels	·	1.9 km	MPC · JPL
195207	2002 DN_{2}	—	February 19, 2002	Socorro	LINEAR	(10369)	4.1 km	MPC · JPL
195208	2002 DZ_{3}	—	February 22, 2002	Socorro	LINEAR	·	2.0 km	MPC · JPL
195209	2002 DC_{4}	—	February 21, 2002	Socorro	LINEAR	PHO	1.8 km	MPC · JPL
195210	2002 DV_{5}	—	February 16, 2002	Palomar	NEAT	·	2.3 km	MPC · JPL
195211	2002 DQ_{6}	—	February 20, 2002	Kitt Peak	Spacewatch	·	1.5 km	MPC · JPL
195212	2002 DX_{8}	—	February 19, 2002	Socorro	LINEAR	·	3.8 km	MPC · JPL
195213	2002 DV_{9}	—	February 19, 2002	Socorro	LINEAR	·	2.5 km	MPC · JPL
195214	2002 DL_{11}	—	February 20, 2002	Socorro	LINEAR	·	1.9 km	MPC · JPL
195215	2002 DP_{11}	—	February 20, 2002	Socorro	LINEAR	·	1.7 km	MPC · JPL
195216	2002 DR_{11}	—	February 17, 2002	Palomar	NEAT	·	2.5 km	MPC · JPL
195217	2002 DU_{11}	—	February 20, 2002	Kitt Peak	Spacewatch	L4	10 km	MPC · JPL
195218	2002 DX_{12}	—	February 24, 2002	Palomar	NEAT	L4	12 km	MPC · JPL
195219	2002 DN_{13}	—	February 16, 2002	Palomar	NEAT	·	2.1 km	MPC · JPL
195220	2002 DZ_{13}	—	February 16, 2002	Palomar	NEAT	·	2.1 km	MPC · JPL
195221	2002 DD_{14}	—	February 16, 2002	Palomar	NEAT	MAS	870 m	MPC · JPL
195222	2002 DL_{14}	—	February 16, 2002	Palomar	NEAT	·	1.5 km	MPC · JPL
195223	2002 DE_{17}	—	February 20, 2002	Anderson Mesa	LONEOS	·	2.1 km	MPC · JPL
195224	2002 DS_{17}	—	February 20, 2002	Socorro	LINEAR	MAS	960 m	MPC · JPL
195225	2002 DZ_{17}	—	February 20, 2002	Socorro	LINEAR	MAS	1.0 km	MPC · JPL
195226	2002 DG_{18}	—	February 20, 2002	Socorro	LINEAR	PAD	3.5 km	MPC · JPL
195227	2002 DH_{18}	—	February 20, 2002	Socorro	LINEAR	·	1.4 km	MPC · JPL
195228	2002 DJ_{18}	—	February 21, 2002	Kvistaberg	Uppsala-DLR Asteroid Survey	EUN	1.5 km	MPC · JPL
195229	2002 DT_{19}	—	February 17, 2002	Palomar	NEAT	·	2.3 km	MPC · JPL
195230	2002 ER_{4}	—	March 10, 2002	Cima Ekar	ADAS	L4	10 km	MPC · JPL
195231	2002 EU_{4}	—	March 10, 2002	Cima Ekar	ADAS	HNS	1.2 km	MPC · JPL
195232	2002 EB_{8}	—	March 12, 2002	Palomar	NEAT	L4	10 km	MPC · JPL
195233	2002 EK_{10}	—	March 14, 2002	Palomar	NEAT	·	3.3 km	MPC · JPL
195234	2002 EG_{11}	—	March 14, 2002	Desert Eagle	W. K. Y. Yeung	·	4.0 km	MPC · JPL
195235	2002 EU_{12}	—	March 14, 2002	Desert Eagle	W. K. Y. Yeung	·	3.1 km	MPC · JPL
195236	2002 EL_{14}	—	March 5, 2002	Haleakala	NEAT	·	2.0 km	MPC · JPL
195237	2002 EV_{15}	—	March 6, 2002	Palomar	NEAT	·	5.0 km	MPC · JPL
195238	2002 ET_{16}	—	March 6, 2002	Socorro	LINEAR	·	2.6 km	MPC · JPL
195239	2002 ES_{17}	—	March 5, 2002	Kitt Peak	Spacewatch	·	2.2 km	MPC · JPL
195240	2002 EG_{22}	—	March 10, 2002	Haleakala	NEAT	(18466)	3.0 km	MPC · JPL
195241	2002 EM_{22}	—	March 10, 2002	Haleakala	NEAT	·	2.7 km	MPC · JPL
195242	2002 EY_{24}	—	March 5, 2002	Kitt Peak	Spacewatch	·	2.4 km	MPC · JPL
195243	2002 EF_{30}	—	March 9, 2002	Socorro	LINEAR	·	2.0 km	MPC · JPL
195244	2002 EP_{34}	—	March 11, 2002	Palomar	NEAT	·	1.5 km	MPC · JPL
195245	2002 EN_{37}	—	March 9, 2002	Kitt Peak	Spacewatch	L4	10 km	MPC · JPL
195246	2002 ES_{40}	—	March 9, 2002	Socorro	LINEAR	(32418)	4.0 km	MPC · JPL
195247	2002 EE_{41}	—	March 10, 2002	Socorro	LINEAR	·	1.9 km	MPC · JPL
195248	2002 EQ_{41}	—	March 12, 2002	Socorro	LINEAR	·	1.7 km	MPC · JPL
195249	2002 EX_{42}	—	March 12, 2002	Socorro	LINEAR	·	1.4 km	MPC · JPL
195250	2002 EG_{46}	—	March 11, 2002	Palomar	NEAT	·	2.7 km	MPC · JPL
195251	2002 EL_{46}	—	March 11, 2002	Palomar	NEAT	·	2.4 km	MPC · JPL
195252	2002 EK_{48}	—	March 12, 2002	Palomar	NEAT	·	1.1 km	MPC · JPL
195253	2002 EA_{49}	—	March 12, 2002	Palomar	NEAT	·	1.8 km	MPC · JPL
195254	2002 EM_{49}	—	March 12, 2002	Palomar	NEAT	·	3.5 km	MPC · JPL
195255	2002 EU_{50}	—	March 12, 2002	Palomar	NEAT	·	1.4 km	MPC · JPL
195256	2002 ER_{51}	—	March 9, 2002	Socorro	LINEAR	EUN	2.1 km	MPC · JPL
195257	2002 EM_{52}	—	March 9, 2002	Socorro	LINEAR	·	1.9 km	MPC · JPL
195258	2002 EN_{52}	—	March 9, 2002	Socorro	LINEAR	L4	10 km	MPC · JPL
195259	2002 EY_{53}	—	March 13, 2002	Socorro	LINEAR	MAS	1.1 km	MPC · JPL
195260	2002 ED_{54}	—	March 13, 2002	Socorro	LINEAR	·	2.8 km	MPC · JPL
195261	2002 EW_{54}	—	March 9, 2002	Socorro	LINEAR	RAF	1.3 km	MPC · JPL
195262	2002 EB_{55}	—	March 9, 2002	Socorro	LINEAR	·	5.1 km	MPC · JPL
195263	2002 ET_{55}	—	March 13, 2002	Socorro	LINEAR	·	2.1 km	MPC · JPL
195264	2002 EN_{56}	—	March 13, 2002	Socorro	LINEAR	·	1.6 km	MPC · JPL
195265	2002 EX_{56}	—	March 13, 2002	Socorro	LINEAR	·	2.0 km	MPC · JPL
195266	2002 EQ_{60}	—	March 13, 2002	Socorro	LINEAR	·	1.7 km	MPC · JPL
195267	2002 ET_{60}	—	March 13, 2002	Socorro	LINEAR	·	1.8 km	MPC · JPL
195268	2002 EY_{60}	—	March 13, 2002	Socorro	LINEAR	(5)	3.2 km	MPC · JPL
195269	2002 EZ_{60}	—	March 13, 2002	Socorro	LINEAR	L4	10 km	MPC · JPL
195270	2002 EG_{62}	—	March 13, 2002	Socorro	LINEAR	·	2.3 km	MPC · JPL
195271	2002 EX_{62}	—	March 13, 2002	Socorro	LINEAR	·	1.6 km	MPC · JPL
195272	2002 EP_{63}	—	March 13, 2002	Socorro	LINEAR	·	1.7 km	MPC · JPL
195273	2002 EW_{63}	—	March 13, 2002	Socorro	LINEAR	L4	14 km	MPC · JPL
195274	2002 EY_{65}	—	March 13, 2002	Socorro	LINEAR	·	1.5 km	MPC · JPL
195275	2002 EQ_{66}	—	March 13, 2002	Socorro	LINEAR	·	1.3 km	MPC · JPL
195276	2002 EK_{67}	—	March 13, 2002	Socorro	LINEAR	·	4.2 km	MPC · JPL
195277	2002 EA_{68}	—	March 13, 2002	Socorro	LINEAR	·	1.3 km	MPC · JPL
195278	2002 EH_{72}	—	March 13, 2002	Socorro	LINEAR	·	3.2 km	MPC · JPL
195279	2002 EP_{72}	—	March 13, 2002	Socorro	LINEAR	·	3.6 km	MPC · JPL
195280	2002 EK_{73}	—	March 13, 2002	Socorro	LINEAR	·	3.7 km	MPC · JPL
195281	2002 EU_{73}	—	March 13, 2002	Socorro	LINEAR	KON	4.0 km	MPC · JPL
195282	2002 EA_{74}	—	March 13, 2002	Socorro	LINEAR	HNS	1.7 km	MPC · JPL
195283	2002 ES_{75}	—	March 14, 2002	Palomar	NEAT	·	3.0 km	MPC · JPL
195284	2002 EC_{76}	—	March 10, 2002	Kitt Peak	Spacewatch	L4	13 km	MPC · JPL
195285	2002 EY_{78}	—	March 10, 2002	Haleakala	NEAT	·	2.0 km	MPC · JPL
195286	2002 EC_{79}	—	March 10, 2002	Haleakala	NEAT	L4	10 km	MPC · JPL
195287	2002 EV_{79}	—	March 12, 2002	Palomar	NEAT	L4 · ERY	13 km	MPC · JPL
195288	2002 ET_{82}	—	March 13, 2002	Palomar	NEAT	·	1.8 km	MPC · JPL
195289	2002 EZ_{82}	—	March 13, 2002	Palomar	NEAT	·	3.1 km	MPC · JPL
195290	2002 EC_{83}	—	March 13, 2002	Palomar	NEAT	HNS	1.8 km	MPC · JPL
195291	2002 EN_{83}	—	March 9, 2002	Socorro	LINEAR	·	3.3 km	MPC · JPL
195292	2002 EB_{85}	—	March 9, 2002	Socorro	LINEAR	·	2.2 km	MPC · JPL
195293	2002 EO_{85}	—	March 9, 2002	Socorro	LINEAR	(5)	3.9 km	MPC · JPL
195294	2002 EE_{86}	—	March 9, 2002	Socorro	LINEAR	·	3.0 km	MPC · JPL
195295	2002 ER_{87}	—	March 9, 2002	Socorro	LINEAR	·	3.4 km	MPC · JPL
195296	2002 EB_{88}	—	March 9, 2002	Socorro	LINEAR	·	1.7 km	MPC · JPL
195297	2002 EF_{88}	—	March 9, 2002	Socorro	LINEAR	EUN	1.8 km	MPC · JPL
195298	2002 EY_{90}	—	March 12, 2002	Socorro	LINEAR	·	2.4 km	MPC · JPL
195299	2002 EB_{92}	—	March 13, 2002	Socorro	LINEAR	·	1.6 km	MPC · JPL
195300	2002 EA_{93}	—	March 14, 2002	Socorro	LINEAR	·	2.7 km	MPC · JPL

== 195301–195400 ==
back to top

Designation			Discovery			Properties		Ref
Permanent	Provisional	Named after	Date	Site	Discoverer(s)	Category	Diam.	Ref
195301	2002 EH_{94}	—	March 14, 2002	Socorro	LINEAR	·	2.3 km	MPC · JPL
195302	2002 EK_{94}	—	March 14, 2002	Socorro	LINEAR	·	1.2 km	MPC · JPL
195303	2002 EW_{95}	—	March 14, 2002	Socorro	LINEAR	·	2.6 km	MPC · JPL
195304	2002 EJ_{96}	—	March 10, 2002	Kitt Peak	Spacewatch	·	920 m	MPC · JPL
195305	2002 EX_{96}	—	March 11, 2002	Kitt Peak	Spacewatch	MIS	3.8 km	MPC · JPL
195306	2002 EF_{100}	—	March 5, 2002	Anderson Mesa	LONEOS	HNS · slow	2.0 km	MPC · JPL
195307	2002 EC_{102}	—	March 6, 2002	Socorro	LINEAR	·	2.1 km	MPC · JPL
195308	2002 EK_{106}	—	March 9, 2002	Anderson Mesa	LONEOS	L4	12 km	MPC · JPL
195309	2002 EY_{106}	—	March 9, 2002	Anderson Mesa	LONEOS	L4	15 km	MPC · JPL
195310	2002 ES_{108}	—	March 9, 2002	Palomar	NEAT	MAS	1.2 km	MPC · JPL
195311	2002 EN_{109}	—	March 9, 2002	Kitt Peak	Spacewatch	·	2.5 km	MPC · JPL
195312	2002 EW_{109}	—	March 9, 2002	Kitt Peak	Spacewatch	L4	11 km	MPC · JPL
195313	2002 ED_{112}	—	March 9, 2002	Kitt Peak	Spacewatch	·	1.9 km	MPC · JPL
195314	2002 EU_{112}	—	March 10, 2002	Kitt Peak	Spacewatch	·	1.2 km	MPC · JPL
195315	2002 EF_{113}	—	March 10, 2002	Kitt Peak	Spacewatch	L4	10 km	MPC · JPL
195316	2002 EL_{113}	—	March 10, 2002	Kitt Peak	Spacewatch	(5)	1.5 km	MPC · JPL
195317	2002 ES_{114}	—	March 10, 2002	Kitt Peak	Spacewatch	·	1.9 km	MPC · JPL
195318	2002 EE_{116}	—	March 11, 2002	Palomar	NEAT	L4	14 km	MPC · JPL
195319	2002 EV_{116}	—	March 9, 2002	Kitt Peak	Spacewatch	·	1.5 km	MPC · JPL
195320	2002 EY_{116}	—	March 9, 2002	Kitt Peak	Spacewatch	·	1.8 km	MPC · JPL
195321	2002 EQ_{117}	—	March 10, 2002	Kitt Peak	Spacewatch	·	2.7 km	MPC · JPL
195322	2002 EF_{121}	—	March 11, 2002	Kitt Peak	Spacewatch	·	3.2 km	MPC · JPL
195323	2002 EL_{123}	—	March 12, 2002	Anderson Mesa	LONEOS	·	2.1 km	MPC · JPL
195324	2002 EO_{123}	—	March 12, 2002	Palomar	NEAT	L4	11 km	MPC · JPL
195325	2002 EH_{126}	—	March 12, 2002	Socorro	LINEAR	HNS	1.7 km	MPC · JPL
195326	2002 ES_{127}	—	March 12, 2002	Palomar	NEAT	·	3.3 km	MPC · JPL
195327	2002 EY_{127}	—	March 12, 2002	Palomar	NEAT	·	2.2 km	MPC · JPL
195328	2002 EG_{128}	—	March 12, 2002	Palomar	NEAT	BRG	2.7 km	MPC · JPL
195329	2002 EN_{128}	—	March 12, 2002	Palomar	NEAT	·	1.9 km	MPC · JPL
195330	2002 EO_{128}	—	March 12, 2002	Palomar	NEAT	AGN	1.7 km	MPC · JPL
195331	2002 EP_{128}	—	March 12, 2002	Palomar	NEAT	·	1.6 km	MPC · JPL
195332	2002 EZ_{132}	—	March 13, 2002	Palomar	NEAT	(5)	2.1 km	MPC · JPL
195333	2002 EE_{135}	—	March 13, 2002	Palomar	NEAT	·	1.6 km	MPC · JPL
195334	2002 EG_{135}	—	March 13, 2002	Palomar	NEAT	·	1.6 km	MPC · JPL
195335	2002 EZ_{135}	—	March 12, 2002	Palomar	NEAT	·	1.7 km	MPC · JPL
195336	2002 EV_{139}	—	March 12, 2002	Kitt Peak	Spacewatch	·	3.4 km	MPC · JPL
195337	2002 EG_{142}	—	March 12, 2002	Palomar	NEAT	L4	20 km	MPC · JPL
195338	2002 EW_{142}	—	March 12, 2002	Palomar	NEAT	·	2.0 km	MPC · JPL
195339	2002 EF_{143}	—	March 12, 2002	Palomar	NEAT	·	2.0 km	MPC · JPL
195340	2002 EM_{146}	—	March 14, 2002	Anderson Mesa	LONEOS	·	2.1 km	MPC · JPL
195341	2002 ER_{146}	—	March 14, 2002	Anderson Mesa	LONEOS	·	1.7 km	MPC · JPL
195342	2002 EQ_{147}	—	March 15, 2002	Palomar	NEAT	·	1.3 km	MPC · JPL
195343	2002 EH_{148}	—	March 15, 2002	Palomar	NEAT	·	1.6 km	MPC · JPL
195344	2002 ER_{150}	—	March 15, 2002	Palomar	NEAT	·	1.5 km	MPC · JPL
195345	2002 EP_{151}	—	March 15, 2002	Kitt Peak	Spacewatch	·	2.4 km	MPC · JPL
195346	2002 ET_{151}	—	March 15, 2002	Socorro	LINEAR	MRX	1.5 km	MPC · JPL
195347	2002 EV_{151}	—	March 15, 2002	Socorro	LINEAR	·	3.4 km	MPC · JPL
195348	2002 EX_{152}	—	March 15, 2002	Palomar	NEAT	·	2.6 km	MPC · JPL
195349	2002 EC_{154}	—	March 9, 2002	Socorro	LINEAR	·	2.3 km	MPC · JPL
195350	2002 EA_{155}	—	March 12, 2002	Socorro	LINEAR	·	2.3 km	MPC · JPL
195351	2002 EH_{157}	—	March 13, 2002	Palomar	NEAT	L4	10 km	MPC · JPL
195352	2002 EB_{160}	—	March 6, 2002	Palomar	NEAT	·	1.7 km	MPC · JPL
195353	2002 FB_{1}	—	March 18, 2002	Desert Eagle	W. K. Y. Yeung	·	2.8 km	MPC · JPL
195354	2002 FG_{5}	—	March 20, 2002	Socorro	LINEAR	H	620 m	MPC · JPL
195355	2002 FS_{8}	—	March 16, 2002	Socorro	LINEAR	MAR	2.2 km	MPC · JPL
195356	2002 FV_{8}	—	March 16, 2002	Socorro	LINEAR	·	3.5 km	MPC · JPL
195357	2002 FW_{9}	—	March 16, 2002	Socorro	LINEAR	·	2.6 km	MPC · JPL
195358	2002 FH_{10}	—	March 16, 2002	Socorro	LINEAR	·	2.4 km	MPC · JPL
195359	2002 FJ_{10}	—	March 16, 2002	Socorro	LINEAR	·	2.0 km	MPC · JPL
195360	2002 FF_{13}	—	March 16, 2002	Socorro	LINEAR	·	2.7 km	MPC · JPL
195361	2002 FO_{13}	—	March 16, 2002	Socorro	LINEAR	·	1.5 km	MPC · JPL
195362	2002 FH_{15}	—	March 16, 2002	Haleakala	NEAT	·	2.3 km	MPC · JPL
195363	2002 FF_{24}	—	March 18, 2002	Haleakala	NEAT	·	3.6 km	MPC · JPL
195364	2002 FH_{25}	—	March 19, 2002	Palomar	NEAT	(194)	3.4 km	MPC · JPL
195365	2002 FM_{25}	—	March 19, 2002	Palomar	NEAT	·	3.0 km	MPC · JPL
195366	2002 FS_{26}	—	March 20, 2002	Socorro	LINEAR	EUN	1.8 km	MPC · JPL
195367	2002 FJ_{27}	—	March 20, 2002	Socorro	LINEAR	ADE	6.1 km	MPC · JPL
195368	2002 FR_{28}	—	March 20, 2002	Socorro	LINEAR	·	3.1 km	MPC · JPL
195369	2002 FZ_{29}	—	March 20, 2002	Socorro	LINEAR	·	2.4 km	MPC · JPL
195370	2002 FF_{30}	—	March 20, 2002	Palomar	NEAT	EUN	1.9 km	MPC · JPL
195371	2002 FS_{31}	—	March 19, 2002	Anderson Mesa	LONEOS	·	1.5 km	MPC · JPL
195372	2002 FY_{31}	—	March 20, 2002	Anderson Mesa	LONEOS	·	1.9 km	MPC · JPL
195373	2002 FH_{32}	—	March 20, 2002	Anderson Mesa	LONEOS	·	2.1 km	MPC · JPL
195374	2002 FX_{32}	—	March 21, 2002	Palomar	NEAT	·	2.2 km	MPC · JPL
195375	2002 FY_{32}	—	March 19, 2002	Anderson Mesa	LONEOS	·	6.3 km	MPC · JPL
195376	2002 FD_{34}	—	March 20, 2002	Socorro	LINEAR	·	2.7 km	MPC · JPL
195377	2002 FT_{37}	—	March 31, 2002	Palomar	NEAT	·	3.5 km	MPC · JPL
195378	2002 FV_{37}	—	March 31, 2002	Palomar	NEAT	EUN · slow	1.8 km	MPC · JPL
195379	2002 FD_{40}	—	March 20, 2002	Socorro	LINEAR	·	4.0 km	MPC · JPL
195380	2002 GY	—	April 3, 2002	Palomar	NEAT	·	4.9 km	MPC · JPL
195381	2002 GL_{1}	—	April 2, 2002	Eskridge	Farpoint	·	2.1 km	MPC · JPL
195382	2002 GY_{4}	—	April 10, 2002	Palomar	NEAT	·	3.7 km	MPC · JPL
195383	2002 GJ_{5}	—	April 10, 2002	Socorro	LINEAR	H	790 m	MPC · JPL
195384	2002 GP_{6}	—	April 9, 2002	Socorro	LINEAR	H	870 m	MPC · JPL
195385	2002 GN_{7}	—	April 14, 2002	Desert Eagle	W. K. Y. Yeung	·	1.4 km	MPC · JPL
195386	2002 GY_{7}	—	April 14, 2002	Desert Eagle	W. K. Y. Yeung	·	3.1 km	MPC · JPL
195387	2002 GN_{8}	—	April 4, 2002	Palomar	NEAT	TIN	1.6 km	MPC · JPL
195388	2002 GK_{9}	—	April 15, 2002	Desert Eagle	W. K. Y. Yeung	fast	2.2 km	MPC · JPL
195389	2002 GQ_{9}	—	April 10, 2002	Socorro	LINEAR	H	920 m	MPC · JPL
195390	2002 GJ_{10}	—	April 5, 2002	Bergisch Gladbach	W. Bickel	·	2.5 km	MPC · JPL
195391	2002 GV_{10}	—	April 10, 2002	Socorro	LINEAR	H	970 m	MPC · JPL
195392	2002 GJ_{11}	—	April 14, 2002	Desert Eagle	W. K. Y. Yeung	·	3.0 km	MPC · JPL
195393	2002 GK_{12}	—	April 14, 2002	Haleakala	NEAT	·	3.0 km	MPC · JPL
195394	2002 GF_{14}	—	April 14, 2002	Socorro	LINEAR	GEF	2.2 km	MPC · JPL
195395	2002 GU_{14}	—	April 15, 2002	Socorro	LINEAR	·	1.6 km	MPC · JPL
195396	2002 GH_{15}	—	April 15, 2002	Socorro	LINEAR	·	2.1 km	MPC · JPL
195397	2002 GB_{16}	—	April 15, 2002	Socorro	LINEAR	GEF	2.2 km	MPC · JPL
195398	2002 GV_{17}	—	April 15, 2002	Socorro	LINEAR	·	1.8 km	MPC · JPL
195399	2002 GK_{20}	—	April 14, 2002	Socorro	LINEAR	BRA	3.1 km	MPC · JPL
195400	2002 GO_{20}	—	April 14, 2002	Socorro	LINEAR	·	2.3 km	MPC · JPL

== 195401–195500 ==
back to top

Designation			Discovery			Properties		Ref
Permanent	Provisional	Named after	Date	Site	Discoverer(s)	Category	Diam.	Ref
195401	2002 GO_{21}	—	April 14, 2002	Socorro	LINEAR	·	1.9 km	MPC · JPL
195402	2002 GV_{21}	—	April 14, 2002	Socorro	LINEAR	·	1.6 km	MPC · JPL
195403	2002 GU_{22}	—	April 14, 2002	Haleakala	NEAT	·	1.6 km	MPC · JPL
195404	2002 GY_{23}	—	April 15, 2002	Palomar	NEAT	·	5.7 km	MPC · JPL
195405 Lentyler	2002 GQ_{27}	Lentyler	April 6, 2002	Cerro Tololo	M. W. Buie	·	1.0 km	MPC · JPL
195406	2002 GT_{35}	—	April 2, 2002	Kitt Peak	Spacewatch	·	2.2 km	MPC · JPL
195407	2002 GJ_{37}	—	April 3, 2002	Kitt Peak	Spacewatch	·	2.8 km	MPC · JPL
195408	2002 GW_{37}	—	April 3, 2002	Kitt Peak	Spacewatch	AGN	1.8 km	MPC · JPL
195409	2002 GK_{38}	—	April 2, 2002	Kitt Peak	Spacewatch	·	3.5 km	MPC · JPL
195410	2002 GO_{38}	—	April 2, 2002	Kitt Peak	Spacewatch	·	2.1 km	MPC · JPL
195411	2002 GX_{38}	—	April 2, 2002	Kitt Peak	Spacewatch	·	3.6 km	MPC · JPL
195412	2002 GF_{39}	—	April 4, 2002	Palomar	NEAT	L4 · ERY	19 km	MPC · JPL
195413	2002 GC_{40}	—	April 4, 2002	Palomar	NEAT	·	2.3 km	MPC · JPL
195414	2002 GF_{40}	—	April 4, 2002	Palomar	NEAT	·	2.9 km	MPC · JPL
195415	2002 GJ_{40}	—	April 4, 2002	Palomar	NEAT	L4	17 km	MPC · JPL
195416	2002 GA_{41}	—	April 4, 2002	Haleakala	NEAT	·	2.4 km	MPC · JPL
195417	2002 GQ_{42}	—	April 4, 2002	Palomar	NEAT	·	2.5 km	MPC · JPL
195418	2002 GU_{42}	—	April 4, 2002	Palomar	NEAT	·	2.2 km	MPC · JPL
195419	2002 GL_{43}	—	April 4, 2002	Palomar	NEAT	·	2.3 km	MPC · JPL
195420	2002 GT_{43}	—	April 4, 2002	Palomar	NEAT	·	2.5 km	MPC · JPL
195421	2002 GW_{44}	—	April 4, 2002	Haleakala	NEAT	·	3.3 km	MPC · JPL
195422	2002 GN_{46}	—	April 4, 2002	Haleakala	NEAT	·	3.3 km	MPC · JPL
195423	2002 GQ_{46}	—	April 5, 2002	Anderson Mesa	LONEOS	·	1.7 km	MPC · JPL
195424	2002 GN_{49}	—	April 5, 2002	Palomar	NEAT	·	1.9 km	MPC · JPL
195425	2002 GL_{50}	—	April 5, 2002	Palomar	NEAT	·	3.4 km	MPC · JPL
195426	2002 GU_{51}	—	April 5, 2002	Palomar	NEAT	·	2.6 km	MPC · JPL
195427	2002 GY_{51}	—	April 5, 2002	Palomar	NEAT	·	3.0 km	MPC · JPL
195428	2002 GW_{54}	—	April 5, 2002	Palomar	NEAT	·	2.0 km	MPC · JPL
195429	2002 GQ_{58}	—	April 8, 2002	Palomar	NEAT	·	1.7 km	MPC · JPL
195430	2002 GP_{60}	—	April 8, 2002	Kitt Peak	Spacewatch	EUN	2.2 km	MPC · JPL
195431	2002 GM_{61}	—	April 8, 2002	Palomar	NEAT	·	1.7 km	MPC · JPL
195432	2002 GY_{61}	—	April 8, 2002	Palomar	NEAT	·	2.9 km	MPC · JPL
195433	2002 GP_{64}	—	April 8, 2002	Palomar	NEAT	MIS	2.9 km	MPC · JPL
195434	2002 GL_{65}	—	April 8, 2002	Kitt Peak	Spacewatch	·	2.5 km	MPC · JPL
195435	2002 GY_{65}	—	April 8, 2002	Palomar	NEAT	·	2.5 km	MPC · JPL
195436	2002 GV_{66}	—	April 8, 2002	Palomar	NEAT	·	2.4 km	MPC · JPL
195437	2002 GZ_{67}	—	April 8, 2002	Palomar	NEAT	·	2.6 km	MPC · JPL
195438	2002 GR_{69}	—	April 8, 2002	Palomar	NEAT	·	3.8 km	MPC · JPL
195439	2002 GQ_{72}	—	April 9, 2002	Anderson Mesa	LONEOS	·	2.7 km	MPC · JPL
195440	2002 GB_{73}	—	April 9, 2002	Anderson Mesa	LONEOS	·	1.8 km	MPC · JPL
195441	2002 GN_{73}	—	April 9, 2002	Anderson Mesa	LONEOS	NEM	3.3 km	MPC · JPL
195442	2002 GT_{75}	—	April 9, 2002	Socorro	LINEAR	·	1.7 km	MPC · JPL
195443	2002 GF_{76}	—	April 9, 2002	Anderson Mesa	LONEOS	PHO	1.9 km	MPC · JPL
195444	2002 GG_{77}	—	April 9, 2002	Anderson Mesa	LONEOS	·	3.1 km	MPC · JPL
195445	2002 GQ_{78}	—	April 9, 2002	Anderson Mesa	LONEOS	MAR	1.9 km	MPC · JPL
195446	2002 GH_{79}	—	April 10, 2002	Socorro	LINEAR	slow	2.9 km	MPC · JPL
195447	2002 GY_{81}	—	April 10, 2002	Socorro	LINEAR	NEM	3.5 km	MPC · JPL
195448	2002 GD_{82}	—	April 10, 2002	Socorro	LINEAR	·	2.0 km	MPC · JPL
195449	2002 GZ_{84}	—	April 10, 2002	Socorro	LINEAR	·	3.5 km	MPC · JPL
195450	2002 GA_{85}	—	April 10, 2002	Socorro	LINEAR	·	2.4 km	MPC · JPL
195451	2002 GX_{85}	—	April 10, 2002	Socorro	LINEAR	HNS	1.7 km	MPC · JPL
195452	2002 GQ_{90}	—	April 8, 2002	Palomar	NEAT	PAD	4.1 km	MPC · JPL
195453	2002 GA_{92}	—	April 9, 2002	Socorro	LINEAR	DOR	3.9 km	MPC · JPL
195454	2002 GP_{92}	—	April 9, 2002	Palomar	NEAT	·	1.3 km	MPC · JPL
195455	2002 GH_{93}	—	April 9, 2002	Socorro	LINEAR	·	3.3 km	MPC · JPL
195456	2002 GR_{93}	—	April 9, 2002	Socorro	LINEAR	HNS	1.9 km	MPC · JPL
195457	2002 GE_{94}	—	April 9, 2002	Socorro	LINEAR	·	2.7 km	MPC · JPL
195458	2002 GC_{95}	—	April 9, 2002	Socorro	LINEAR	·	4.4 km	MPC · JPL
195459	2002 GE_{99}	—	April 10, 2002	Socorro	LINEAR	·	2.8 km	MPC · JPL
195460	2002 GA_{103}	—	April 10, 2002	Socorro	LINEAR	·	1.7 km	MPC · JPL
195461	2002 GD_{104}	—	April 10, 2002	Socorro	LINEAR	(5)	2.0 km	MPC · JPL
195462	2002 GL_{104}	—	April 10, 2002	Socorro	LINEAR	·	2.6 km	MPC · JPL
195463	2002 GS_{104}	—	April 10, 2002	Socorro	LINEAR	·	3.3 km	MPC · JPL
195464	2002 GT_{104}	—	April 10, 2002	Socorro	LINEAR	·	3.8 km	MPC · JPL
195465	2002 GH_{111}	—	April 10, 2002	Socorro	LINEAR	·	2.8 km	MPC · JPL
195466	2002 GR_{112}	—	April 10, 2002	Socorro	LINEAR	·	3.4 km	MPC · JPL
195467	2002 GT_{114}	—	April 11, 2002	Socorro	LINEAR	L4	15 km	MPC · JPL
195468	2002 GM_{115}	—	April 11, 2002	Socorro	LINEAR	·	1.9 km	MPC · JPL
195469	2002 GY_{115}	—	April 11, 2002	Socorro	LINEAR	·	3.2 km	MPC · JPL
195470	2002 GY_{118}	—	April 12, 2002	Palomar	NEAT	·	1.3 km	MPC · JPL
195471	2002 GV_{119}	—	April 12, 2002	Socorro	LINEAR	MAR	1.7 km	MPC · JPL
195472	2002 GF_{124}	—	April 12, 2002	Socorro	LINEAR	·	2.1 km	MPC · JPL
195473	2002 GY_{125}	—	April 12, 2002	Socorro	LINEAR	·	2.9 km	MPC · JPL
195474	2002 GL_{126}	—	April 12, 2002	Socorro	LINEAR	·	2.9 km	MPC · JPL
195475	2002 GQ_{126}	—	April 12, 2002	Socorro	LINEAR	·	1.4 km	MPC · JPL
195476	2002 GT_{127}	—	April 12, 2002	Socorro	LINEAR	·	2.2 km	MPC · JPL
195477	2002 GK_{129}	—	April 12, 2002	Socorro	LINEAR	AGN	1.6 km	MPC · JPL
195478	2002 GV_{129}	—	April 12, 2002	Socorro	LINEAR	·	3.0 km	MPC · JPL
195479	2002 GX_{130}	—	April 12, 2002	Socorro	LINEAR	·	1.7 km	MPC · JPL
195480	2002 GK_{132}	—	April 12, 2002	Socorro	LINEAR	·	2.5 km	MPC · JPL
195481	2002 GO_{132}	—	April 12, 2002	Socorro	LINEAR	AEO	1.6 km	MPC · JPL
195482	2002 GF_{134}	—	April 12, 2002	Socorro	LINEAR	·	2.9 km	MPC · JPL
195483	2002 GV_{137}	—	April 12, 2002	Palomar	NEAT	·	2.1 km	MPC · JPL
195484	2002 GH_{139}	—	April 13, 2002	Kitt Peak	Spacewatch	·	2.9 km	MPC · JPL
195485	2002 GG_{142}	—	April 13, 2002	Palomar	NEAT	GEF	2.2 km	MPC · JPL
195486	2002 GP_{145}	—	April 12, 2002	Socorro	LINEAR	·	2.3 km	MPC · JPL
195487	2002 GF_{146}	—	April 13, 2002	Palomar	NEAT	·	2.6 km	MPC · JPL
195488	2002 GB_{149}	—	April 14, 2002	Kitt Peak	Spacewatch	·	3.2 km	MPC · JPL
195489	2002 GH_{150}	—	April 14, 2002	Socorro	LINEAR	EUN	2.1 km	MPC · JPL
195490	2002 GO_{150}	—	April 14, 2002	Socorro	LINEAR	L4	11 km	MPC · JPL
195491	2002 GR_{151}	—	April 14, 2002	Palomar	NEAT	·	2.7 km	MPC · JPL
195492	2002 GO_{160}	—	April 15, 2002	Palomar	NEAT	·	2.2 km	MPC · JPL
195493	2002 GK_{161}	—	April 15, 2002	Anderson Mesa	LONEOS	·	2.0 km	MPC · JPL
195494	2002 GP_{162}	—	April 14, 2002	Palomar	NEAT	·	2.0 km	MPC · JPL
195495	2002 GY_{162}	—	April 14, 2002	Palomar	NEAT	L4	11 km	MPC · JPL
195496	2002 GM_{164}	—	April 14, 2002	Palomar	NEAT	·	2.9 km	MPC · JPL
195497	2002 GL_{165}	—	April 14, 2002	Palomar	NEAT	·	2.3 km	MPC · JPL
195498	2002 GX_{168}	—	April 9, 2002	Socorro	LINEAR	·	2.6 km	MPC · JPL
195499	2002 GJ_{169}	—	April 9, 2002	Socorro	LINEAR	·	2.6 km	MPC · JPL
195500	2002 GK_{170}	—	April 9, 2002	Socorro	LINEAR	·	1.7 km	MPC · JPL

== 195501–195600 ==
back to top

Designation			Discovery			Properties		Ref
Permanent	Provisional	Named after	Date	Site	Discoverer(s)	Category	Diam.	Ref
195501	2002 GT_{170}	—	April 9, 2002	Socorro	LINEAR	·	2.0 km	MPC · JPL
195502	2002 GY_{172}	—	April 10, 2002	Socorro	LINEAR	·	3.2 km	MPC · JPL
195503	2002 GJ_{174}	—	April 11, 2002	Socorro	LINEAR	·	2.3 km	MPC · JPL
195504	2002 GM_{177}	—	April 12, 2002	Palomar	White, M., M. Collins	HNS	1.6 km	MPC · JPL
195505	2002 GT_{179}	—	April 14, 2002	Palomar	NEAT	L4	11 km	MPC · JPL
195506	2002 GW_{181}	—	April 10, 2002	Socorro	LINEAR	GEF	2.4 km	MPC · JPL
195507	2002 GN_{182}	—	April 15, 2002	Palomar	NEAT	·	2.3 km	MPC · JPL
195508	2002 HJ	—	April 16, 2002	Desert Eagle	W. K. Y. Yeung	·	3.4 km	MPC · JPL
195509	2002 HT_{4}	—	April 17, 2002	Socorro	LINEAR	H	810 m	MPC · JPL
195510	2002 HX_{4}	—	April 16, 2002	Socorro	LINEAR	DOR	6.6 km	MPC · JPL
195511	2002 HV_{5}	—	April 19, 2002	Emerald Lane	L. Ball	NYS	1.7 km	MPC · JPL
195512	2002 HH_{6}	—	April 17, 2002	Palomar	NEAT	·	2.8 km	MPC · JPL
195513	2002 HY_{7}	—	April 20, 2002	Kitt Peak	Spacewatch	·	2.6 km	MPC · JPL
195514	2002 HG_{14}	—	April 16, 2002	Socorro	LINEAR	·	3.6 km	MPC · JPL
195515	2002 HN_{14}	—	April 16, 2002	Socorro	LINEAR	·	4.1 km	MPC · JPL
195516	2002 HR_{15}	—	April 17, 2002	Socorro	LINEAR	·	2.0 km	MPC · JPL
195517	2002 JX_{1}	—	May 4, 2002	Desert Eagle	W. K. Y. Yeung	DOR	6.2 km	MPC · JPL
195518	2002 JB_{6}	—	May 5, 2002	Palomar	NEAT	·	3.3 km	MPC · JPL
195519	2002 JN_{7}	—	May 4, 2002	Palomar	NEAT	·	3.0 km	MPC · JPL
195520	2002 JK_{8}	—	May 6, 2002	Palomar	NEAT	(18466)	4.2 km	MPC · JPL
195521	2002 JV_{16}	—	May 6, 2002	Palomar	NEAT	·	4.8 km	MPC · JPL
195522	2002 JW_{16}	—	May 7, 2002	Palomar	NEAT	·	1.9 km	MPC · JPL
195523	2002 JW_{19}	—	May 7, 2002	Palomar	NEAT	·	3.4 km	MPC · JPL
195524	2002 JN_{20}	—	May 7, 2002	Palomar	NEAT	·	3.7 km	MPC · JPL
195525	2002 JN_{21}	—	May 8, 2002	Haleakala	NEAT	EUN	2.1 km	MPC · JPL
195526	2002 JF_{24}	—	May 8, 2002	Socorro	LINEAR	·	2.1 km	MPC · JPL
195527	2002 JC_{27}	—	May 8, 2002	Socorro	LINEAR	·	1.8 km	MPC · JPL
195528	2002 JT_{27}	—	May 8, 2002	Socorro	LINEAR	·	1.7 km	MPC · JPL
195529	2002 JQ_{28}	—	May 9, 2002	Socorro	LINEAR	·	5.3 km	MPC · JPL
195530	2002 JV_{28}	—	May 9, 2002	Socorro	LINEAR	·	3.1 km	MPC · JPL
195531	2002 JY_{29}	—	May 9, 2002	Socorro	LINEAR	·	4.3 km	MPC · JPL
195532	2002 JA_{35}	—	May 9, 2002	Socorro	LINEAR	HNS	1.8 km	MPC · JPL
195533	2002 JQ_{37}	—	May 8, 2002	Haleakala	NEAT	·	1.9 km	MPC · JPL
195534	2002 JB_{40}	—	May 8, 2002	Socorro	LINEAR	·	4.3 km	MPC · JPL
195535	2002 JJ_{41}	—	May 8, 2002	Socorro	LINEAR	·	2.4 km	MPC · JPL
195536	2002 JC_{44}	—	May 9, 2002	Socorro	LINEAR	·	5.1 km	MPC · JPL
195537	2002 JJ_{44}	—	May 9, 2002	Socorro	LINEAR	·	4.7 km	MPC · JPL
195538	2002 JO_{45}	—	May 9, 2002	Socorro	LINEAR	·	2.9 km	MPC · JPL
195539	2002 JQ_{45}	—	May 9, 2002	Socorro	LINEAR	·	2.1 km	MPC · JPL
195540	2002 JG_{46}	—	May 9, 2002	Socorro	LINEAR	·	2.7 km	MPC · JPL
195541	2002 JM_{46}	—	May 9, 2002	Socorro	LINEAR	·	2.5 km	MPC · JPL
195542	2002 JO_{48}	—	May 9, 2002	Socorro	LINEAR	·	2.8 km	MPC · JPL
195543	2002 JO_{56}	—	May 9, 2002	Socorro	LINEAR	·	2.6 km	MPC · JPL
195544	2002 JP_{57}	—	May 9, 2002	Socorro	LINEAR	GEF	2.2 km	MPC · JPL
195545	2002 JG_{60}	—	May 10, 2002	Socorro	LINEAR	·	3.5 km	MPC · JPL
195546	2002 JE_{62}	—	May 8, 2002	Socorro	LINEAR	·	3.5 km	MPC · JPL
195547	2002 JN_{62}	—	May 8, 2002	Socorro	LINEAR	·	2.2 km	MPC · JPL
195548	2002 JP_{65}	—	May 9, 2002	Socorro	LINEAR	·	3.0 km	MPC · JPL
195549	2002 JP_{66}	—	May 10, 2002	Socorro	LINEAR	·	3.7 km	MPC · JPL
195550	2002 JB_{67}	—	May 10, 2002	Socorro	LINEAR	·	3.8 km	MPC · JPL
195551	2002 JE_{67}	—	May 10, 2002	Socorro	LINEAR	·	3.5 km	MPC · JPL
195552	2002 JL_{67}	—	May 11, 2002	Socorro	LINEAR	·	4.8 km	MPC · JPL
195553	2002 JA_{68}	—	May 11, 2002	Palomar	NEAT	EUN	1.6 km	MPC · JPL
195554	2002 JD_{68}	—	May 8, 2002	Socorro	LINEAR	H	630 m	MPC · JPL
195555	2002 JR_{68}	—	May 6, 2002	Socorro	LINEAR	·	3.7 km	MPC · JPL
195556	2002 JB_{69}	—	May 7, 2002	Socorro	LINEAR	·	4.9 km	MPC · JPL
195557	2002 JH_{69}	—	May 7, 2002	Socorro	LINEAR	·	4.5 km	MPC · JPL
195558	2002 JB_{71}	—	May 8, 2002	Socorro	LINEAR	·	2.5 km	MPC · JPL
195559	2002 JT_{71}	—	May 8, 2002	Socorro	LINEAR	·	4.5 km	MPC · JPL
195560	2002 JK_{72}	—	May 8, 2002	Socorro	LINEAR	·	4.8 km	MPC · JPL
195561	2002 JR_{73}	—	May 8, 2002	Socorro	LINEAR	·	3.0 km	MPC · JPL
195562	2002 JN_{76}	—	May 11, 2002	Socorro	LINEAR	·	2.6 km	MPC · JPL
195563	2002 JX_{76}	—	May 11, 2002	Socorro	LINEAR	·	1.8 km	MPC · JPL
195564	2002 JC_{77}	—	May 11, 2002	Socorro	LINEAR	·	3.6 km	MPC · JPL
195565	2002 JB_{78}	—	May 11, 2002	Socorro	LINEAR	·	2.7 km	MPC · JPL
195566	2002 JR_{80}	—	May 11, 2002	Socorro	LINEAR	·	2.4 km	MPC · JPL
195567	2002 JA_{81}	—	May 11, 2002	Socorro	LINEAR	·	2.0 km	MPC · JPL
195568	2002 JB_{81}	—	May 11, 2002	Socorro	LINEAR	HNS	1.9 km	MPC · JPL
195569	2002 JQ_{82}	—	May 11, 2002	Socorro	LINEAR	·	2.7 km	MPC · JPL
195570	2002 JF_{84}	—	May 11, 2002	Socorro	LINEAR	·	4.3 km	MPC · JPL
195571	2002 JT_{84}	—	May 11, 2002	Socorro	LINEAR	·	3.6 km	MPC · JPL
195572	2002 JY_{84}	—	May 11, 2002	Socorro	LINEAR	·	2.4 km	MPC · JPL
195573	2002 JW_{92}	—	May 11, 2002	Socorro	LINEAR	HOF	4.3 km	MPC · JPL
195574	2002 JG_{97}	—	May 12, 2002	Palomar	NEAT	·	3.1 km	MPC · JPL
195575	2002 JH_{97}	—	May 12, 2002	Palomar	NEAT	·	4.2 km	MPC · JPL
195576	2002 JT_{99}	—	May 11, 2002	Socorro	LINEAR	H	1.0 km	MPC · JPL
195577	2002 JU_{99}	—	May 12, 2002	Ondřejov	P. Kušnirák	·	4.0 km	MPC · JPL
195578	2002 JB_{100}	—	May 11, 2002	Socorro	LINEAR	·	6.9 km	MPC · JPL
195579	2002 JB_{101}	—	May 6, 2002	Socorro	LINEAR	·	7.2 km	MPC · JPL
195580	2002 JY_{101}	—	May 9, 2002	Socorro	LINEAR	·	3.2 km	MPC · JPL
195581	2002 JX_{103}	—	May 10, 2002	Socorro	LINEAR	·	2.6 km	MPC · JPL
195582	2002 JY_{109}	—	May 11, 2002	Socorro	LINEAR	·	3.9 km	MPC · JPL
195583	2002 JQ_{118}	—	May 5, 2002	Palomar	NEAT	·	3.5 km	MPC · JPL
195584	2002 JG_{119}	—	May 5, 2002	Anderson Mesa	LONEOS	·	2.6 km	MPC · JPL
195585	2002 JS_{119}	—	May 5, 2002	Palomar	NEAT	·	3.1 km	MPC · JPL
195586	2002 JE_{121}	—	May 5, 2002	Palomar	NEAT	·	2.3 km	MPC · JPL
195587	2002 JF_{121}	—	May 5, 2002	Palomar	NEAT	·	2.2 km	MPC · JPL
195588	2002 JR_{124}	—	May 6, 2002	Palomar	NEAT	·	2.9 km	MPC · JPL
195589	2002 JL_{125}	—	May 7, 2002	Palomar	NEAT	·	2.6 km	MPC · JPL
195590	2002 JC_{127}	—	May 7, 2002	Anderson Mesa	LONEOS	WIT	2.0 km	MPC · JPL
195591	2002 JU_{129}	—	May 8, 2002	Socorro	LINEAR	·	4.9 km	MPC · JPL
195592	2002 JW_{129}	—	May 8, 2002	Socorro	LINEAR	(5)	1.6 km	MPC · JPL
195593	2002 JZ_{130}	—	May 8, 2002	Socorro	LINEAR	·	4.8 km	MPC · JPL
195594	2002 JV_{131}	—	May 9, 2002	Palomar	NEAT	·	2.4 km	MPC · JPL
195595	2002 JV_{133}	—	May 9, 2002	Socorro	LINEAR	GEF	2.4 km	MPC · JPL
195596	2002 JT_{139}	—	May 10, 2002	Palomar	NEAT	·	3.0 km	MPC · JPL
195597	2002 JN_{143}	—	May 13, 2002	Palomar	NEAT	·	3.5 km	MPC · JPL
195598	2002 JC_{144}	—	May 13, 2002	Socorro	LINEAR	·	1.6 km	MPC · JPL
195599	2002 JA_{146}	—	May 15, 2002	Palomar	NEAT	·	2.4 km	MPC · JPL
195600 Scheithauer	2002 JH_{148}	Scheithauer	May 15, 2002	Palomar	M. Meyer	·	3.0 km	MPC · JPL

== 195601–195700 ==
back to top

Designation			Discovery			Properties		Ref
Permanent	Provisional	Named after	Date	Site	Discoverer(s)	Category	Diam.	Ref
195601	2002 JU_{148}	—	May 9, 2002	Palomar	NEAT	AGN	1.9 km	MPC · JPL
195602	2002 KN_{1}	—	May 17, 2002	Palomar	NEAT	·	2.0 km	MPC · JPL
195603	2002 KO_{2}	—	May 17, 2002	Palomar	NEAT	·	4.5 km	MPC · JPL
195604	2002 KX_{2}	—	May 18, 2002	Palomar	NEAT	·	2.1 km	MPC · JPL
195605	2002 KY_{9}	—	May 16, 2002	Socorro	LINEAR	·	2.1 km	MPC · JPL
195606	2002 KO_{10}	—	May 16, 2002	Socorro	LINEAR	WIT	2.0 km	MPC · JPL
195607	2002 KS_{10}	—	May 16, 2002	Socorro	LINEAR	·	2.0 km	MPC · JPL
195608	2002 KO_{11}	—	May 17, 2002	Socorro	LINEAR	H	1.1 km	MPC · JPL
195609	2002 KM_{13}	—	May 18, 2002	Palomar	NEAT	·	2.9 km	MPC · JPL
195610	2002 LS_{1}	—	June 2, 2002	Palomar	NEAT	·	2.0 km	MPC · JPL
195611	2002 LP_{12}	—	June 5, 2002	Socorro	LINEAR	·	4.0 km	MPC · JPL
195612	2002 LB_{14}	—	June 6, 2002	Socorro	LINEAR	·	4.2 km	MPC · JPL
195613	2002 LQ_{16}	—	June 6, 2002	Socorro	LINEAR	·	3.0 km	MPC · JPL
195614	2002 LG_{20}	—	June 6, 2002	Socorro	LINEAR	·	8.0 km	MPC · JPL
195615	2002 LN_{20}	—	June 6, 2002	Socorro	LINEAR	·	3.3 km	MPC · JPL
195616	2002 LD_{25}	—	June 2, 2002	Palomar	NEAT	·	5.4 km	MPC · JPL
195617	2002 LP_{25}	—	June 5, 2002	Socorro	LINEAR	·	3.2 km	MPC · JPL
195618	2002 LA_{32}	—	June 8, 2002	Socorro	LINEAR	·	4.8 km	MPC · JPL
195619	2002 LN_{37}	—	June 12, 2002	Socorro	LINEAR	·	5.0 km	MPC · JPL
195620	2002 LD_{41}	—	June 10, 2002	Socorro	LINEAR	·	2.4 km	MPC · JPL
195621	2002 LN_{44}	—	June 4, 2002	Palomar	NEAT	·	2.2 km	MPC · JPL
195622	2002 LC_{45}	—	June 5, 2002	Anderson Mesa	LONEOS	·	3.8 km	MPC · JPL
195623	2002 LO_{46}	—	June 11, 2002	Socorro	LINEAR	·	5.6 km	MPC · JPL
195624	2002 LZ_{50}	—	June 8, 2002	Palomar	NEAT	GEF	2.5 km	MPC · JPL
195625	2002 LQ_{54}	—	June 8, 2002	Palomar	NEAT	LUT	7.1 km	MPC · JPL
195626	2002 LA_{58}	—	June 14, 2002	Socorro	LINEAR	·	4.7 km	MPC · JPL
195627	2002 LS_{60}	—	June 3, 2002	Needville	Needville	·	2.1 km	MPC · JPL
195628	2002 LA_{62}	—	June 6, 2002	Kitt Peak	Spacewatch	·	4.9 km	MPC · JPL
195629	2002 MB_{5}	—	June 16, 2002	Palomar	NEAT	·	2.8 km	MPC · JPL
195630	2002 NE_{3}	—	July 5, 2002	Palomar	NEAT	·	3.9 km	MPC · JPL
195631	2002 NG_{3}	—	July 5, 2002	Palomar	NEAT	·	3.2 km	MPC · JPL
195632	2002 NQ_{3}	—	July 8, 2002	Palomar	NEAT	·	4.5 km	MPC · JPL
195633	2002 NM_{4}	—	July 3, 2002	Palomar	NEAT	·	4.6 km	MPC · JPL
195634	2002 NP_{4}	—	July 9, 2002	Campo Imperatore	CINEOS	·	4.4 km	MPC · JPL
195635	2002 NB_{6}	—	July 11, 2002	Campo Imperatore	CINEOS	·	3.6 km	MPC · JPL
195636	2002 ND_{8}	—	July 12, 2002	Palomar	NEAT	·	4.5 km	MPC · JPL
195637	2002 NM_{10}	—	July 4, 2002	Palomar	NEAT	TEL	4.0 km	MPC · JPL
195638	2002 NT_{16}	—	July 7, 2002	Palomar	NEAT	·	6.2 km	MPC · JPL
195639	2002 NE_{24}	—	July 9, 2002	Socorro	LINEAR	·	6.6 km	MPC · JPL
195640	2002 NT_{27}	—	July 9, 2002	Socorro	LINEAR	T_{j} (2.99) · EUP	6.7 km	MPC · JPL
195641	2002 NU_{27}	—	July 9, 2002	Socorro	LINEAR	·	7.5 km	MPC · JPL
195642	2002 NM_{28}	—	July 12, 2002	Palomar	NEAT	EOS ·	6.9 km	MPC · JPL
195643	2002 NN_{29}	—	July 14, 2002	Reedy Creek	J. Broughton	·	6.4 km	MPC · JPL
195644	2002 NC_{34}	—	July 14, 2002	Palomar	NEAT	·	3.0 km	MPC · JPL
195645	2002 NB_{36}	—	July 9, 2002	Socorro	LINEAR	·	4.8 km	MPC · JPL
195646	2002 NN_{36}	—	July 9, 2002	Socorro	LINEAR	·	6.1 km	MPC · JPL
195647	2002 NW_{36}	—	July 9, 2002	Socorro	LINEAR	EOS	3.7 km	MPC · JPL
195648	2002 NV_{39}	—	July 14, 2002	Palomar	NEAT	·	2.7 km	MPC · JPL
195649	2002 NB_{44}	—	July 11, 2002	Campo Imperatore	CINEOS	·	2.7 km	MPC · JPL
195650	2002 NQ_{45}	—	July 13, 2002	Palomar	NEAT	·	3.1 km	MPC · JPL
195651	2002 NR_{58}	—	July 12, 2002	Palomar	NEAT	·	4.5 km	MPC · JPL
195652	2002 NV_{58}	—	July 12, 2002	Palomar	NEAT	EOS	2.3 km	MPC · JPL
195653	2002 NX_{58}	—	July 12, 2002	Palomar	NEAT	·	5.9 km	MPC · JPL
195654	2002 NZ_{58}	—	July 14, 2002	Palomar	NEAT	·	2.2 km	MPC · JPL
195655	2002 NO_{59}	—	July 15, 2002	Palomar	NEAT	·	2.3 km	MPC · JPL
195656	2002 NR_{59}	—	July 9, 2002	Palomar	NEAT	·	3.3 km	MPC · JPL
195657 Zhuangqining	2002 NN_{60}	Zhuangqining	July 12, 2002	Palomar	NEAT	EOS	2.7 km	MPC · JPL
195658	2002 NV_{61}	—	July 9, 2002	Socorro	LINEAR	·	3.3 km	MPC · JPL
195659	2002 NF_{62}	—	July 5, 2002	Palomar	NEAT	·	2.5 km	MPC · JPL
195660	2002 NB_{63}	—	July 9, 2002	Palomar	NEAT	KOR	1.7 km	MPC · JPL
195661	2002 NH_{65}	—	July 5, 2002	Palomar	NEAT	·	2.2 km	MPC · JPL
195662	2002 NW_{66}	—	July 8, 2002	Palomar	NEAT	EOS	2.1 km	MPC · JPL
195663	2002 NN_{67}	—	July 5, 2002	Palomar	NEAT	·	2.9 km	MPC · JPL
195664	2002 OM	—	July 17, 2002	Socorro	LINEAR	·	8.9 km	MPC · JPL
195665	2002 OU_{4}	—	July 16, 2002	Haleakala	NEAT	·	6.8 km	MPC · JPL
195666	2002 OT_{5}	—	July 20, 2002	Palomar	NEAT	LIX	3.8 km	MPC · JPL
195667	2002 OJ_{6}	—	July 20, 2002	Palomar	NEAT	·	5.5 km	MPC · JPL
195668	2002 OY_{6}	—	July 20, 2002	Palomar	NEAT	·	4.6 km	MPC · JPL
195669	2002 OS_{9}	—	July 21, 2002	Palomar	NEAT	EOS	3.2 km	MPC · JPL
195670	2002 OZ_{9}	—	July 21, 2002	Palomar	NEAT	·	5.2 km	MPC · JPL
195671	2002 OO_{14}	—	July 18, 2002	Socorro	LINEAR	EOS	3.5 km	MPC · JPL
195672	2002 OY_{17}	—	July 18, 2002	Socorro	LINEAR	·	4.6 km	MPC · JPL
195673	2002 OA_{18}	—	July 18, 2002	Socorro	LINEAR	·	4.0 km	MPC · JPL
195674	2002 OW_{20}	—	July 22, 2002	Palomar	NEAT	·	3.8 km	MPC · JPL
195675	2002 OQ_{22}	—	July 18, 2002	Socorro	LINEAR	·	6.1 km	MPC · JPL
195676	2002 OM_{23}	—	July 22, 2002	Palomar	NEAT	·	5.4 km	MPC · JPL
195677	2002 OQ_{23}	—	July 22, 2002	Palomar	NEAT	·	7.0 km	MPC · JPL
195678	2002 OX_{24}	—	July 23, 2002	Palomar	S. F. Hönig	·	5.6 km	MPC · JPL
195679	2002 OY_{25}	—	July 23, 2002	Palomar	NEAT	·	3.5 km	MPC · JPL
195680	2002 OG_{29}	—	July 21, 2002	Palomar	NEAT	·	4.6 km	MPC · JPL
195681	2002 OD_{30}	—	July 21, 2002	Palomar	NEAT	·	3.8 km	MPC · JPL
195682	2002 OE_{30}	—	July 21, 2002	Palomar	NEAT	·	5.4 km	MPC · JPL
195683	2002 OL_{30}	—	July 18, 2002	Palomar	NEAT	·	2.5 km	MPC · JPL
195684	2002 PY	—	August 1, 2002	Socorro	LINEAR	·	8.4 km	MPC · JPL
195685	2002 PW_{2}	—	August 3, 2002	Palomar	NEAT	·	7.1 km	MPC · JPL
195686	2002 PR_{4}	—	August 4, 2002	Palomar	NEAT	·	6.2 km	MPC · JPL
195687	2002 PT_{4}	—	August 4, 2002	Palomar	NEAT	EOS	3.1 km	MPC · JPL
195688	2002 PS_{5}	—	August 4, 2002	Palomar	NEAT	EOS	3.1 km	MPC · JPL
195689	2002 PP_{8}	—	August 5, 2002	Palomar	NEAT	·	5.6 km	MPC · JPL
195690	2002 PF_{10}	—	August 5, 2002	Palomar	NEAT	EOS	2.7 km	MPC · JPL
195691	2002 PS_{10}	—	August 5, 2002	Palomar	NEAT	·	6.4 km	MPC · JPL
195692	2002 PJ_{11}	—	August 5, 2002	Campo Imperatore	CINEOS	·	2.3 km	MPC · JPL
195693	2002 PC_{12}	—	August 5, 2002	Palomar	NEAT	HYG	3.4 km	MPC · JPL
195694	2002 PX_{12}	—	August 5, 2002	Palomar	NEAT	EOS	3.2 km	MPC · JPL
195695	2002 PU_{16}	—	August 6, 2002	Palomar	NEAT	·	4.4 km	MPC · JPL
195696	2002 PM_{18}	—	August 6, 2002	Palomar	NEAT	·	4.9 km	MPC · JPL
195697	2002 PR_{23}	—	August 6, 2002	Palomar	NEAT	VER	4.1 km	MPC · JPL
195698	2002 PC_{25}	—	August 6, 2002	Palomar	NEAT	·	6.9 km	MPC · JPL
195699	2002 PP_{25}	—	August 6, 2002	Palomar	NEAT	·	2.5 km	MPC · JPL
195700	2002 PY_{26}	—	August 6, 2002	Palomar	NEAT	EOS	3.5 km	MPC · JPL

== 195701–195800 ==
back to top

Designation			Discovery			Properties		Ref
Permanent	Provisional	Named after	Date	Site	Discoverer(s)	Category	Diam.	Ref
195701	2002 PH_{28}	—	August 6, 2002	Palomar	NEAT	·	6.6 km	MPC · JPL
195702	2002 PB_{30}	—	August 6, 2002	Palomar	NEAT	·	4.9 km	MPC · JPL
195703	2002 PQ_{32}	—	August 6, 2002	Palomar	NEAT	EOS	2.9 km	MPC · JPL
195704	2002 PH_{35}	—	August 6, 2002	Palomar	NEAT	·	4.3 km	MPC · JPL
195705	2002 PV_{35}	—	August 6, 2002	Palomar	NEAT	EOS	3.3 km	MPC · JPL
195706	2002 PO_{36}	—	August 6, 2002	Palomar	NEAT	·	3.1 km	MPC · JPL
195707	2002 PQ_{36}	—	August 6, 2002	Palomar	NEAT	·	6.7 km	MPC · JPL
195708	2002 PV_{38}	—	August 6, 2002	Palomar	NEAT	HYG	3.4 km	MPC · JPL
195709	2002 PP_{40}	—	August 6, 2002	Socorro	LINEAR	·	6.9 km	MPC · JPL
195710	2002 PA_{47}	—	August 10, 2002	Socorro	LINEAR	EOS	3.2 km	MPC · JPL
195711	2002 PL_{47}	—	August 10, 2002	Socorro	LINEAR	·	5.2 km	MPC · JPL
195712	2002 PD_{49}	—	August 10, 2002	Socorro	LINEAR	EOS	4.5 km	MPC · JPL
195713	2002 PO_{49}	—	August 10, 2002	Socorro	LINEAR	·	6.2 km	MPC · JPL
195714	2002 PM_{53}	—	August 8, 2002	Palomar	NEAT	·	6.2 km	MPC · JPL
195715	2002 PE_{57}	—	August 9, 2002	Socorro	LINEAR	·	5.4 km	MPC · JPL
195716	2002 PM_{57}	—	August 9, 2002	Socorro	LINEAR	·	8.6 km	MPC · JPL
195717	2002 PD_{58}	—	August 9, 2002	Socorro	LINEAR	·	11 km	MPC · JPL
195718	2002 PJ_{59}	—	August 10, 2002	Socorro	LINEAR	·	6.8 km	MPC · JPL
195719	2002 PV_{59}	—	August 10, 2002	Socorro	LINEAR	TIR	5.8 km	MPC · JPL
195720	2002 PF_{61}	—	August 11, 2002	Socorro	LINEAR	·	7.4 km	MPC · JPL
195721	2002 PG_{61}	—	August 11, 2002	Socorro	LINEAR	·	6.0 km	MPC · JPL
195722	2002 PK_{63}	—	August 8, 2002	Palomar	NEAT	EOS	3.7 km	MPC · JPL
195723	2002 PL_{69}	—	August 11, 2002	Socorro	LINEAR	·	4.7 km	MPC · JPL
195724	2002 PM_{70}	—	August 11, 2002	Socorro	LINEAR	·	5.5 km	MPC · JPL
195725	2002 PM_{71}	—	August 12, 2002	Socorro	LINEAR	·	3.6 km	MPC · JPL
195726	2002 PY_{74}	—	August 12, 2002	Socorro	LINEAR	·	5.2 km	MPC · JPL
195727	2002 PP_{75}	—	August 8, 2002	Palomar	NEAT	·	4.4 km	MPC · JPL
195728	2002 PY_{75}	—	August 8, 2002	Palomar	NEAT	·	2.4 km	MPC · JPL
195729	2002 PO_{79}	—	August 11, 2002	Palomar	NEAT	·	4.2 km	MPC · JPL
195730	2002 PL_{80}	—	August 6, 2002	Kvistaberg	Uppsala-DLR Asteroid Survey	·	4.9 km	MPC · JPL
195731	2002 PB_{82}	—	August 9, 2002	Socorro	LINEAR	·	5.0 km	MPC · JPL
195732	2002 PC_{88}	—	August 12, 2002	Socorro	LINEAR	·	3.9 km	MPC · JPL
195733	2002 PB_{90}	—	August 11, 2002	Socorro	LINEAR	URS ·	5.7 km	MPC · JPL
195734	2002 PU_{90}	—	August 12, 2002	Haleakala	NEAT	·	6.8 km	MPC · JPL
195735	2002 PE_{91}	—	August 13, 2002	Socorro	LINEAR	·	5.8 km	MPC · JPL
195736	2002 PA_{92}	—	August 14, 2002	Palomar	NEAT	·	4.2 km	MPC · JPL
195737	2002 PQ_{92}	—	August 14, 2002	Palomar	NEAT	·	6.9 km	MPC · JPL
195738	2002 PV_{92}	—	August 14, 2002	Palomar	NEAT	·	5.6 km	MPC · JPL
195739	2002 PF_{93}	—	August 14, 2002	Palomar	NEAT	·	5.9 km	MPC · JPL
195740	2002 PN_{95}	—	August 14, 2002	Socorro	LINEAR	EOS	3.0 km	MPC · JPL
195741	2002 PN_{98}	—	August 14, 2002	Socorro	LINEAR	·	4.2 km	MPC · JPL
195742	2002 PD_{101}	—	August 12, 2002	Socorro	LINEAR	LIX	6.7 km	MPC · JPL
195743	2002 PW_{101}	—	August 12, 2002	Socorro	LINEAR	EOS	3.4 km	MPC · JPL
195744	2002 PB_{102}	—	August 12, 2002	Socorro	LINEAR	·	4.8 km	MPC · JPL
195745	2002 PS_{102}	—	August 12, 2002	Socorro	LINEAR	·	3.8 km	MPC · JPL
195746	2002 PZ_{102}	—	August 12, 2002	Socorro	LINEAR	·	3.7 km	MPC · JPL
195747	2002 PD_{103}	—	August 12, 2002	Socorro	LINEAR	·	4.5 km	MPC · JPL
195748	2002 PK_{103}	—	August 12, 2002	Socorro	LINEAR	·	5.5 km	MPC · JPL
195749	2002 PZ_{103}	—	August 12, 2002	Socorro	LINEAR	·	5.3 km	MPC · JPL
195750	2002 PA_{104}	—	August 12, 2002	Socorro	LINEAR	URS	6.8 km	MPC · JPL
195751	2002 PM_{104}	—	August 12, 2002	Socorro	LINEAR	EOS	2.7 km	MPC · JPL
195752	2002 PU_{104}	—	August 12, 2002	Socorro	LINEAR	·	5.7 km	MPC · JPL
195753	2002 PX_{104}	—	August 12, 2002	Socorro	LINEAR	·	3.9 km	MPC · JPL
195754	2002 PZ_{104}	—	August 12, 2002	Socorro	LINEAR	TEL	1.9 km	MPC · JPL
195755	2002 PB_{105}	—	August 12, 2002	Socorro	LINEAR	EOS	3.6 km	MPC · JPL
195756	2002 PO_{105}	—	August 12, 2002	Socorro	LINEAR	VER	4.6 km	MPC · JPL
195757	2002 PO_{106}	—	August 12, 2002	Socorro	LINEAR	·	5.2 km	MPC · JPL
195758	2002 PQ_{106}	—	August 12, 2002	Socorro	LINEAR	VER	3.8 km	MPC · JPL
195759	2002 PU_{106}	—	August 12, 2002	Socorro	LINEAR	EOS	2.9 km	MPC · JPL
195760	2002 PU_{107}	—	August 13, 2002	Palomar	NEAT	EOS	3.1 km	MPC · JPL
195761	2002 PZ_{111}	—	August 14, 2002	Socorro	LINEAR	·	4.5 km	MPC · JPL
195762	2002 PW_{117}	—	August 13, 2002	Palomar	NEAT	·	4.0 km	MPC · JPL
195763	2002 PT_{118}	—	August 13, 2002	Anderson Mesa	LONEOS	EOS	2.8 km	MPC · JPL
195764	2002 PF_{121}	—	August 13, 2002	Anderson Mesa	LONEOS	·	4.2 km	MPC · JPL
195765	2002 PK_{121}	—	August 13, 2002	Anderson Mesa	LONEOS	LUT	7.7 km	MPC · JPL
195766	2002 PT_{122}	—	August 14, 2002	Anderson Mesa	LONEOS	·	4.5 km	MPC · JPL
195767	2002 PN_{125}	—	August 14, 2002	Socorro	LINEAR	·	4.7 km	MPC · JPL
195768	2002 PQ_{125}	—	August 14, 2002	Socorro	LINEAR	·	6.8 km	MPC · JPL
195769	2002 PO_{127}	—	August 14, 2002	Socorro	LINEAR	HYG	5.1 km	MPC · JPL
195770	2002 PG_{129}	—	August 14, 2002	Socorro	LINEAR	·	3.8 km	MPC · JPL
195771	2002 PK_{131}	—	August 14, 2002	Palomar	NEAT	·	7.8 km	MPC · JPL
195772 Shirleygrace	2002 PG_{133}	Shirleygrace	August 14, 2002	Socorro	LINEAR	EOS	3.0 km	MPC · JPL
195773	2002 PD_{136}	—	August 14, 2002	Socorro	LINEAR	·	3.7 km	MPC · JPL
195774	2002 PL_{137}	—	August 15, 2002	Anderson Mesa	LONEOS	HYG	4.1 km	MPC · JPL
195775	2002 PF_{141}	—	August 4, 2002	Socorro	LINEAR	·	7.7 km	MPC · JPL
195776	2002 PJ_{151}	—	August 8, 2002	Palomar	NEAT	·	3.7 km	MPC · JPL
195777 Sheepman	2002 PP_{154}	Sheepman	August 12, 2002	Cerro Tololo	Chiang, E., M. W. Buie	TEL	2.4 km	MPC · JPL
195778	2002 PC_{156}	—	August 8, 2002	Palomar	S. F. Hönig	·	2.8 km	MPC · JPL
195779	2002 PM_{157}	—	August 8, 2002	Palomar	S. F. Hönig	EOS	2.8 km	MPC · JPL
195780	2002 PN_{160}	—	August 8, 2002	Palomar	S. F. Hönig	KOR	2.1 km	MPC · JPL
195781	2002 PL_{162}	—	August 8, 2002	Palomar	S. F. Hönig	·	2.2 km	MPC · JPL
195782	2002 PS_{162}	—	August 8, 2002	Palomar	S. F. Hönig	·	3.7 km	MPC · JPL
195783	2002 PO_{163}	—	August 8, 2002	Palomar	S. F. Hönig	·	2.4 km	MPC · JPL
195784	2002 PZ_{163}	—	August 8, 2002	Palomar	S. F. Hönig	·	4.1 km	MPC · JPL
195785	2002 PA_{164}	—	August 8, 2002	Palomar	S. F. Hönig	·	5.7 km	MPC · JPL
195786	2002 PY_{166}	—	August 15, 2002	Palomar	NEAT	·	5.1 km	MPC · JPL
195787	2002 PN_{168}	—	August 8, 2002	Palomar	NEAT	THM	2.9 km	MPC · JPL
195788	2002 PH_{171}	—	August 8, 2002	Palomar	NEAT	·	3.0 km	MPC · JPL
195789	2002 PM_{171}	—	August 7, 2002	Palomar	NEAT	·	2.7 km	MPC · JPL
195790	2002 PC_{172}	—	August 8, 2002	Palomar	NEAT	·	3.7 km	MPC · JPL
195791	2002 PU_{172}	—	August 11, 2002	Palomar	NEAT	KOR	1.8 km	MPC · JPL
195792	2002 PS_{176}	—	August 7, 2002	Palomar	NEAT	·	2.4 km	MPC · JPL
195793	2002 PR_{179}	—	August 8, 2002	Palomar	NEAT	·	2.9 km	MPC · JPL
195794	2002 PJ_{181}	—	August 15, 2002	Palomar	NEAT	·	4.9 km	MPC · JPL
195795	2002 QD_{2}	—	August 16, 2002	Palomar	NEAT	(159)	4.0 km	MPC · JPL
195796	2002 QE_{3}	—	August 16, 2002	Palomar	NEAT	EOS	3.2 km	MPC · JPL
195797	2002 QJ_{3}	—	August 16, 2002	Palomar	NEAT	·	4.0 km	MPC · JPL
195798	2002 QF_{4}	—	August 16, 2002	Haleakala	NEAT	·	3.9 km	MPC · JPL
195799	2002 QW_{7}	—	August 19, 2002	Palomar	NEAT	·	3.7 km	MPC · JPL
195800	2002 QD_{8}	—	August 19, 2002	Palomar	NEAT	·	4.5 km	MPC · JPL

== 195801–195900 ==
back to top

Designation			Discovery			Properties		Ref
Permanent	Provisional	Named after	Date	Site	Discoverer(s)	Category	Diam.	Ref
195801	2002 QE_{8}	—	August 19, 2002	Palomar	NEAT	TIR	5.5 km	MPC · JPL
195802	2002 QG_{9}	—	August 19, 2002	Palomar	NEAT	URS	7.4 km	MPC · JPL
195803	2002 QC_{11}	—	August 24, 2002	Palomar	NEAT	EUP	5.1 km	MPC · JPL
195804	2002 QB_{12}	—	August 26, 2002	Palomar	NEAT	·	5.9 km	MPC · JPL
195805	2002 QN_{14}	—	August 26, 2002	Palomar	NEAT	VER	6.0 km	MPC · JPL
195806	2002 QP_{16}	—	August 26, 2002	Palomar	NEAT	·	3.6 km	MPC · JPL
195807	2002 QF_{17}	—	August 24, 2002	Palomar	NEAT	·	810 m	MPC · JPL
195808	2002 QN_{17}	—	August 27, 2002	Palomar	NEAT	EOS	3.1 km	MPC · JPL
195809	2002 QL_{18}	—	August 28, 2002	Palomar	NEAT	·	6.5 km	MPC · JPL
195810	2002 QP_{18}	—	August 26, 2002	Palomar	NEAT	·	3.0 km	MPC · JPL
195811	2002 QA_{19}	—	August 26, 2002	Palomar	NEAT	·	4.6 km	MPC · JPL
195812	2002 QL_{19}	—	August 26, 2002	Palomar	NEAT	·	4.8 km	MPC · JPL
195813	2002 QY_{19}	—	August 28, 2002	Palomar	NEAT	·	4.6 km	MPC · JPL
195814	2002 QB_{20}	—	August 28, 2002	Palomar	NEAT	·	5.7 km	MPC · JPL
195815	2002 QJ_{21}	—	August 28, 2002	Palomar	NEAT	EOS	3.1 km	MPC · JPL
195816	2002 QP_{21}	—	August 26, 2002	Palomar	NEAT	THM	3.4 km	MPC · JPL
195817	2002 QP_{22}	—	August 27, 2002	Palomar	NEAT	·	4.0 km	MPC · JPL
195818	2002 QU_{27}	—	August 28, 2002	Palomar	NEAT	·	4.5 km	MPC · JPL
195819	2002 QY_{30}	—	August 29, 2002	Palomar	NEAT	THM	3.2 km	MPC · JPL
195820	2002 QF_{31}	—	August 29, 2002	Palomar	NEAT	·	3.7 km	MPC · JPL
195821	2002 QL_{35}	—	August 29, 2002	Palomar	NEAT	·	3.8 km	MPC · JPL
195822	2002 QV_{36}	—	August 30, 2002	Kitt Peak	Spacewatch	THM	4.1 km	MPC · JPL
195823	2002 QA_{37}	—	August 30, 2002	Kitt Peak	Spacewatch	URS	5.7 km	MPC · JPL
195824	2002 QB_{37}	—	August 30, 2002	Kitt Peak	Spacewatch	·	2.4 km	MPC · JPL
195825	2002 QJ_{40}	—	August 30, 2002	Palomar	NEAT	·	5.4 km	MPC · JPL
195826	2002 QQ_{45}	—	August 31, 2002	Anderson Mesa	LONEOS	·	6.0 km	MPC · JPL
195827	2002 QE_{48}	—	August 27, 2002	Palomar	S. F. Hönig	·	3.4 km	MPC · JPL
195828	2002 QZ_{53}	—	August 29, 2002	Palomar	S. F. Hönig	·	4.0 km	MPC · JPL
195829	2002 QH_{55}	—	August 29, 2002	Palomar	S. F. Hönig	·	6.4 km	MPC · JPL
195830	2002 QX_{56}	—	August 18, 2002	Palomar	Lowe, A.	THM	3.1 km	MPC · JPL
195831	2002 QN_{59}	—	August 19, 2002	Palomar	NEAT	EOS	2.6 km	MPC · JPL
195832	2002 QO_{59}	—	August 16, 2002	Palomar	NEAT	·	2.8 km	MPC · JPL
195833	2002 QE_{62}	—	August 27, 2002	Palomar	NEAT	·	3.5 km	MPC · JPL
195834	2002 QJ_{62}	—	August 18, 2002	Palomar	NEAT	·	2.8 km	MPC · JPL
195835	2002 QU_{62}	—	August 18, 2002	Palomar	NEAT	·	3.3 km	MPC · JPL
195836	2002 QQ_{64}	—	August 18, 2002	Palomar	NEAT	·	2.5 km	MPC · JPL
195837	2002 QT_{65}	—	August 17, 2002	Palomar	NEAT	·	2.0 km	MPC · JPL
195838	2002 QM_{66}	—	August 29, 2002	Palomar	NEAT	CYB	4.4 km	MPC · JPL
195839	2002 QO_{67}	—	August 18, 2002	Palomar	NEAT	THM	3.1 km	MPC · JPL
195840	2002 QV_{67}	—	August 28, 2002	Palomar	NEAT	EMA	5.1 km	MPC · JPL
195841	2002 QF_{68}	—	August 29, 2002	Palomar	NEAT	·	2.8 km	MPC · JPL
195842	2002 QD_{69}	—	August 30, 2002	Palomar	NEAT	EOS	2.5 km	MPC · JPL
195843	2002 QA_{71}	—	August 19, 2002	Palomar	NEAT	·	6.1 km	MPC · JPL
195844	2002 QA_{72}	—	August 28, 2002	Palomar	NEAT	·	3.9 km	MPC · JPL
195845	2002 QB_{72}	—	August 18, 2002	Palomar	NEAT	·	3.3 km	MPC · JPL
195846	2002 QM_{72}	—	August 28, 2002	Palomar	NEAT	EOS	2.3 km	MPC · JPL
195847	2002 QJ_{75}	—	August 18, 2002	Palomar	NEAT	·	3.6 km	MPC · JPL
195848	2002 QL_{77}	—	August 29, 2002	Palomar	NEAT	·	2.4 km	MPC · JPL
195849	2002 QO_{77}	—	August 16, 2002	Haleakala	NEAT	·	5.0 km	MPC · JPL
195850	2002 QH_{78}	—	August 17, 2002	Palomar	NEAT	THM	2.7 km	MPC · JPL
195851	2002 QH_{79}	—	August 16, 2002	Palomar	NEAT	·	4.1 km	MPC · JPL
195852	2002 QN_{79}	—	August 16, 2002	Palomar	NEAT	·	3.8 km	MPC · JPL
195853 Ouyangtianjing	2002 QA_{80}	Ouyangtianjing	August 18, 2002	Palomar	NEAT	HYG	3.5 km	MPC · JPL
195854	2002 QO_{80}	—	August 30, 2002	Palomar	NEAT	·	3.8 km	MPC · JPL
195855	2002 QS_{80}	—	August 19, 2002	Palomar	NEAT	(159)	3.3 km	MPC · JPL
195856	2002 QE_{83}	—	August 16, 2002	Palomar	NEAT	·	2.1 km	MPC · JPL
195857	2002 QO_{85}	—	August 17, 2002	Palomar	NEAT	·	2.8 km	MPC · JPL
195858	2002 QU_{86}	—	August 16, 2002	Palomar	NEAT	·	3.3 km	MPC · JPL
195859	2002 QM_{88}	—	August 30, 2002	Palomar	NEAT	·	2.9 km	MPC · JPL
195860	2002 QN_{89}	—	August 17, 2002	Palomar	NEAT	·	4.7 km	MPC · JPL
195861	2002 QC_{90}	—	August 19, 2002	Palomar	NEAT	TEL	2.3 km	MPC · JPL
195862	2002 QR_{90}	—	August 30, 2002	Palomar	NEAT	·	4.7 km	MPC · JPL
195863	2002 QV_{90}	—	August 30, 2002	Palomar	NEAT	·	4.7 km	MPC · JPL
195864	2002 QR_{92}	—	August 29, 2002	Palomar	NEAT	·	2.8 km	MPC · JPL
195865	2002 QK_{96}	—	August 16, 2002	Palomar	NEAT	·	3.0 km	MPC · JPL
195866	2002 QJ_{97}	—	August 18, 2002	Palomar	NEAT	KOR	1.9 km	MPC · JPL
195867	2002 QN_{98}	—	August 18, 2002	Palomar	NEAT	EOS	2.2 km	MPC · JPL
195868	2002 QW_{98}	—	August 26, 2002	Palomar	NEAT	URS ·	4.6 km	MPC · JPL
195869	2002 QK_{102}	—	August 20, 2002	Palomar	NEAT	·	4.1 km	MPC · JPL
195870	2002 QZ_{116}	—	August 16, 2002	Palomar	NEAT	·	3.0 km	MPC · JPL
195871	2002 QY_{124}	—	August 27, 2002	Palomar	NEAT	·	2.7 km	MPC · JPL
195872	2002 QT_{125}	—	August 18, 2002	Palomar	NEAT	·	2.4 km	MPC · JPL
195873	2002 RD	—	September 1, 2002	Palomar	NEAT	·	5.9 km	MPC · JPL
195874	2002 RC_{1}	—	September 3, 2002	Emerald Lane	L. Ball	·	5.4 km	MPC · JPL
195875	2002 RQ_{3}	—	September 1, 2002	Haleakala	NEAT	T_{j} (2.97)	6.7 km	MPC · JPL
195876	2002 RT_{3}	—	September 1, 2002	Haleakala	NEAT	EOS	3.3 km	MPC · JPL
195877	2002 RB_{6}	—	September 1, 2002	Haleakala	NEAT	EOS	3.4 km	MPC · JPL
195878	2002 RC_{6}	—	September 1, 2002	Haleakala	NEAT	·	3.4 km	MPC · JPL
195879	2002 RO_{7}	—	September 3, 2002	Haleakala	NEAT	HYG	5.0 km	MPC · JPL
195880	2002 RG_{11}	—	September 4, 2002	Palomar	NEAT	·	4.2 km	MPC · JPL
195881	2002 RN_{12}	—	September 4, 2002	Anderson Mesa	LONEOS	·	5.3 km	MPC · JPL
195882	2002 RT_{12}	—	September 4, 2002	Anderson Mesa	LONEOS	THM	3.4 km	MPC · JPL
195883	2002 RY_{12}	—	September 4, 2002	Anderson Mesa	LONEOS	TIR	3.9 km	MPC · JPL
195884	2002 RB_{15}	—	September 4, 2002	Anderson Mesa	LONEOS	·	6.0 km	MPC · JPL
195885	2002 RZ_{15}	—	September 4, 2002	Anderson Mesa	LONEOS	·	5.9 km	MPC · JPL
195886	2002 RG_{16}	—	September 4, 2002	Anderson Mesa	LONEOS	·	6.7 km	MPC · JPL
195887	2002 RU_{18}	—	September 4, 2002	Anderson Mesa	LONEOS	THM	4.4 km	MPC · JPL
195888	2002 RE_{20}	—	September 4, 2002	Anderson Mesa	LONEOS	LIX	7.9 km	MPC · JPL
195889	2002 RC_{22}	—	September 4, 2002	Anderson Mesa	LONEOS	EOS	3.1 km	MPC · JPL
195890	2002 RJ_{22}	—	September 4, 2002	Anderson Mesa	LONEOS	·	6.0 km	MPC · JPL
195891	2002 RL_{24}	—	September 4, 2002	Anderson Mesa	LONEOS	·	5.0 km	MPC · JPL
195892	2002 RM_{24}	—	September 4, 2002	Anderson Mesa	LONEOS	EOS	3.5 km	MPC · JPL
195893	2002 RH_{30}	—	September 4, 2002	Anderson Mesa	LONEOS	·	5.6 km	MPC · JPL
195894	2002 RA_{31}	—	September 4, 2002	Anderson Mesa	LONEOS	·	5.3 km	MPC · JPL
195895	2002 RK_{33}	—	September 4, 2002	Anderson Mesa	LONEOS	·	7.6 km	MPC · JPL
195896	2002 RY_{34}	—	September 4, 2002	Anderson Mesa	LONEOS	·	3.1 km	MPC · JPL
195897	2002 RZ_{36}	—	September 5, 2002	Anderson Mesa	LONEOS	·	6.6 km	MPC · JPL
195898	2002 RH_{39}	—	September 5, 2002	Socorro	LINEAR	·	3.7 km	MPC · JPL
195899	2002 RP_{39}	—	September 5, 2002	Socorro	LINEAR	THB	5.0 km	MPC · JPL
195900 Rogersudbury	2002 RS_{41}	Rogersudbury	September 5, 2002	Socorro	LINEAR	·	6.0 km	MPC · JPL

== 195901–196000 ==
back to top

Designation			Discovery			Properties		Ref
Permanent	Provisional	Named after	Date	Site	Discoverer(s)	Category	Diam.	Ref
195901	2002 RU_{43}	—	September 5, 2002	Socorro	LINEAR	EOS	3.2 km	MPC · JPL
195902	2002 RY_{44}	—	September 5, 2002	Socorro	LINEAR	THM	3.8 km	MPC · JPL
195903	2002 RP_{47}	—	September 5, 2002	Socorro	LINEAR	·	3.8 km	MPC · JPL
195904	2002 RB_{48}	—	September 5, 2002	Socorro	LINEAR	·	4.3 km	MPC · JPL
195905	2002 RB_{55}	—	September 5, 2002	Anderson Mesa	LONEOS	·	5.6 km	MPC · JPL
195906	2002 RG_{56}	—	September 5, 2002	Anderson Mesa	LONEOS	·	7.3 km	MPC · JPL
195907	2002 RC_{64}	—	September 5, 2002	Socorro	LINEAR	TIR	5.5 km	MPC · JPL
195908	2002 RK_{64}	—	September 5, 2002	Anderson Mesa	LONEOS	·	5.8 km	MPC · JPL
195909	2002 RF_{70}	—	September 4, 2002	Palomar	NEAT	TEL	2.5 km	MPC · JPL
195910	2002 RS_{70}	—	September 4, 2002	Palomar	NEAT	EOS	3.8 km	MPC · JPL
195911	2002 RD_{71}	—	September 4, 2002	Palomar	NEAT	EOS	4.3 km	MPC · JPL
195912	2002 RJ_{71}	—	September 4, 2002	Palomar	NEAT	EMA	4.7 km	MPC · JPL
195913	2002 RG_{73}	—	September 5, 2002	Socorro	LINEAR	VER	4.6 km	MPC · JPL
195914	2002 RS_{75}	—	September 5, 2002	Socorro	LINEAR	·	4.0 km	MPC · JPL
195915	2002 RT_{77}	—	September 5, 2002	Socorro	LINEAR	·	6.0 km	MPC · JPL
195916	2002 RJ_{78}	—	September 5, 2002	Socorro	LINEAR	·	6.6 km	MPC · JPL
195917	2002 RA_{79}	—	September 5, 2002	Socorro	LINEAR	·	5.9 km	MPC · JPL
195918	2002 RJ_{82}	—	September 5, 2002	Socorro	LINEAR	EOS	3.3 km	MPC · JPL
195919	2002 RX_{83}	—	September 5, 2002	Socorro	LINEAR	·	5.0 km	MPC · JPL
195920	2002 RT_{84}	—	September 5, 2002	Socorro	LINEAR	·	6.2 km	MPC · JPL
195921	2002 RZ_{85}	—	September 5, 2002	Socorro	LINEAR	TIR	4.6 km	MPC · JPL
195922	2002 RB_{86}	—	September 5, 2002	Socorro	LINEAR	·	3.3 km	MPC · JPL
195923	2002 RF_{92}	—	September 5, 2002	Socorro	LINEAR	·	3.5 km	MPC · JPL
195924	2002 RJ_{92}	—	September 5, 2002	Socorro	LINEAR	·	4.9 km	MPC · JPL
195925	2002 RQ_{94}	—	September 5, 2002	Socorro	LINEAR	·	5.7 km	MPC · JPL
195926	2002 RR_{95}	—	September 5, 2002	Socorro	LINEAR	·	4.1 km	MPC · JPL
195927	2002 RW_{109}	—	September 6, 2002	Socorro	LINEAR	·	4.4 km	MPC · JPL
195928	2002 RZ_{109}	—	September 6, 2002	Socorro	LINEAR	·	5.9 km	MPC · JPL
195929	2002 RZ_{110}	—	September 6, 2002	Socorro	LINEAR	EOS	4.1 km	MPC · JPL
195930	2002 RO_{113}	—	September 5, 2002	Socorro	LINEAR	·	7.8 km	MPC · JPL
195931	2002 RG_{115}	—	September 6, 2002	Socorro	LINEAR	HYG	4.8 km	MPC · JPL
195932	2002 RM_{117}	—	September 7, 2002	Socorro	LINEAR	slow	5.7 km	MPC · JPL
195933	2002 RL_{119}	—	September 6, 2002	Socorro	LINEAR	AGN	2.2 km	MPC · JPL
195934	2002 RW_{121}	—	September 8, 2002	Haleakala	NEAT	·	8.5 km	MPC · JPL
195935	2002 RC_{122}	—	September 8, 2002	Haleakala	NEAT	·	3.6 km	MPC · JPL
195936	2002 RO_{123}	—	September 9, 2002	Campo Imperatore	CINEOS	·	5.1 km	MPC · JPL
195937	2002 RM_{127}	—	September 10, 2002	Palomar	NEAT	·	8.2 km	MPC · JPL
195938	2002 RG_{128}	—	September 10, 2002	Palomar	NEAT	·	4.8 km	MPC · JPL
195939	2002 RX_{128}	—	September 10, 2002	Palomar	NEAT	·	5.0 km	MPC · JPL
195940	2002 RO_{130}	—	September 10, 2002	Palomar	NEAT	URS	6.9 km	MPC · JPL
195941	2002 RS_{130}	—	September 11, 2002	Palomar	NEAT	EOS ·	5.2 km	MPC · JPL
195942	2002 RA_{132}	—	September 11, 2002	Palomar	NEAT	·	6.4 km	MPC · JPL
195943	2002 RM_{133}	—	September 10, 2002	Palomar	NEAT	·	8.3 km	MPC · JPL
195944	2002 RJ_{134}	—	September 10, 2002	Palomar	NEAT	THB	7.2 km	MPC · JPL
195945	2002 RV_{136}	—	September 11, 2002	Haleakala	NEAT	·	4.9 km	MPC · JPL
195946	2002 RB_{137}	—	September 13, 2002	Michael Adrian	Kretlow, M.	·	3.6 km	MPC · JPL
195947	2002 RL_{139}	—	September 10, 2002	Palomar	NEAT	THB	5.6 km	MPC · JPL
195948	2002 RG_{145}	—	September 11, 2002	Palomar	NEAT	·	3.5 km	MPC · JPL
195949	2002 RE_{146}	—	September 11, 2002	Palomar	NEAT	TIR	2.9 km	MPC · JPL
195950	2002 RO_{149}	—	September 11, 2002	Haleakala	NEAT	·	3.6 km	MPC · JPL
195951	2002 RJ_{153}	—	September 12, 2002	Palomar	NEAT	EOS	3.5 km	MPC · JPL
195952	2002 RN_{153}	—	September 12, 2002	Palomar	NEAT	·	4.5 km	MPC · JPL
195953	2002 RK_{157}	—	September 11, 2002	Palomar	NEAT	·	4.4 km	MPC · JPL
195954	2002 RD_{162}	—	September 12, 2002	Palomar	NEAT	HYG	3.5 km	MPC · JPL
195955	2002 RG_{163}	—	September 12, 2002	Palomar	NEAT	·	4.1 km	MPC · JPL
195956	2002 RP_{164}	—	September 12, 2002	Palomar	NEAT	·	3.7 km	MPC · JPL
195957	2002 RJ_{165}	—	September 13, 2002	Palomar	NEAT	EMA · slow	6.7 km	MPC · JPL
195958	2002 RO_{166}	—	September 13, 2002	Palomar	NEAT	·	4.7 km	MPC · JPL
195959	2002 RP_{167}	—	September 13, 2002	Palomar	NEAT	·	3.7 km	MPC · JPL
195960	2002 RA_{169}	—	September 13, 2002	Palomar	NEAT	EOS	3.0 km	MPC · JPL
195961	2002 RY_{169}	—	September 13, 2002	Palomar	NEAT	·	3.8 km	MPC · JPL
195962	2002 RF_{172}	—	September 13, 2002	Anderson Mesa	LONEOS	·	7.4 km	MPC · JPL
195963	2002 RD_{174}	—	September 13, 2002	Palomar	NEAT	·	7.1 km	MPC · JPL
195964	2002 RO_{174}	—	September 13, 2002	Palomar	NEAT	·	4.5 km	MPC · JPL
195965	2002 RW_{174}	—	September 13, 2002	Palomar	NEAT	·	4.6 km	MPC · JPL
195966	2002 RZ_{175}	—	September 13, 2002	Palomar	NEAT	EOS	2.4 km	MPC · JPL
195967	2002 RC_{176}	—	September 13, 2002	Palomar	NEAT	·	7.1 km	MPC · JPL
195968	2002 RU_{176}	—	September 13, 2002	Palomar	NEAT	·	3.9 km	MPC · JPL
195969	2002 RV_{178}	—	September 14, 2002	Kitt Peak	Spacewatch	THM	2.7 km	MPC · JPL
195970	2002 RL_{184}	—	September 12, 2002	Palomar	NEAT	·	5.7 km	MPC · JPL
195971	2002 RT_{184}	—	September 12, 2002	Palomar	NEAT	·	2.8 km	MPC · JPL
195972	2002 RH_{185}	—	September 12, 2002	Palomar	NEAT	·	6.1 km	MPC · JPL
195973	2002 RH_{186}	—	September 12, 2002	Palomar	NEAT	·	5.5 km	MPC · JPL
195974	2002 RK_{186}	—	September 12, 2002	Palomar	NEAT	·	6.7 km	MPC · JPL
195975	2002 RW_{186}	—	September 12, 2002	Palomar	NEAT	·	4.2 km	MPC · JPL
195976	2002 RO_{190}	—	September 14, 2002	Palomar	NEAT	EOS	3.7 km	MPC · JPL
195977	2002 RG_{192}	—	September 12, 2002	Palomar	NEAT	THM	4.7 km	MPC · JPL
195978	2002 RG_{193}	—	September 12, 2002	Palomar	NEAT	HYG	5.3 km	MPC · JPL
195979	2002 RU_{193}	—	September 12, 2002	Palomar	NEAT	·	4.3 km	MPC · JPL
195980	2002 RL_{196}	—	September 12, 2002	Palomar	NEAT	·	6.4 km	MPC · JPL
195981	2002 RU_{196}	—	September 12, 2002	Haleakala	NEAT	THM	3.2 km	MPC · JPL
195982	2002 RS_{197}	—	September 13, 2002	Palomar	NEAT	·	3.5 km	MPC · JPL
195983	2002 RU_{200}	—	September 13, 2002	Socorro	LINEAR	·	4.0 km	MPC · JPL
195984	2002 RR_{204}	—	September 14, 2002	Palomar	NEAT	(1298)	4.5 km	MPC · JPL
195985	2002 RE_{211}	—	September 14, 2002	Haleakala	NEAT	EUP	6.0 km	MPC · JPL
195986	2002 RO_{216}	—	September 13, 2002	Haleakala	NEAT	·	5.3 km	MPC · JPL
195987	2002 RC_{219}	—	September 15, 2002	Palomar	NEAT	·	4.4 km	MPC · JPL
195988	2002 RG_{219}	—	September 15, 2002	Palomar	NEAT	THM	3.4 km	MPC · JPL
195989	2002 RX_{219}	—	September 15, 2002	Palomar	NEAT	THM	3.2 km	MPC · JPL
195990	2002 RZ_{219}	—	September 15, 2002	Palomar	NEAT	·	4.0 km	MPC · JPL
195991	2002 RV_{220}	—	September 15, 2002	Palomar	NEAT	EOS	2.8 km	MPC · JPL
195992	2002 RO_{224}	—	September 13, 2002	Anderson Mesa	LONEOS	EOS	2.9 km	MPC · JPL
195993	2002 RZ_{224}	—	September 13, 2002	Haleakala	NEAT	·	3.7 km	MPC · JPL
195994	2002 RL_{228}	—	September 14, 2002	Haleakala	NEAT	·	4.5 km	MPC · JPL
195995	2002 RK_{229}	—	September 14, 2002	Haleakala	NEAT	·	5.6 km	MPC · JPL
195996	2002 RD_{234}	—	September 14, 2002	Palomar	R. Matson	·	3.3 km	MPC · JPL
195997	2002 RS_{234}	—	September 4, 2002	Palomar	S. F. Hönig	·	2.5 km	MPC · JPL
195998 Skipwilson	2002 RO_{235}	Skipwilson	September 1, 2002	Haleakala	R. Matson	·	4.9 km	MPC · JPL
195999	2002 RZ_{236}	—	September 12, 2002	Palomar	R. Matson	·	2.6 km	MPC · JPL
196000 Izzard	2002 RY_{237}	Izzard	September 15, 2002	Palomar	R. Matson	·	3.7 km	MPC · JPL

back to top

== See also ==
- Meanings of minor-planet names: 195001–196000
