= Meanings of minor-planet names: 195001–196000 =

As minor planet discoveries are confirmed, they are given a permanent number by the IAU's Minor Planet Center (MPC), and the discoverers can then submit names for them, following the IAU's naming conventions. The list below concerns those minor planets in the specified number-range that have received names, and explains the meanings of those names.

Official naming citations of newly named small Solar System bodies are approved and published in a bulletin by IAU's Working Group for Small Bodies Nomenclature (WGSBN). Before May 2021, citations were published in MPC's Minor Planet Circulars for many decades. Recent citations can also be found on the JPL Small-Body Database (SBDB). Until his death in 2016, German astronomer Lutz D. Schmadel compiled these citations into the Dictionary of Minor Planet Names (DMP) and regularly updated the collection.

Based on Paul Herget's The Names of the Minor Planets, Schmadel also researched the unclear origin of numerous asteroids, most of which had been named prior to World War II. This article incorporates text from this source, which is in the public domain: SBDB New namings may only be added to this list below after official publication as the preannouncement of names is condemned. The WGSBN publishes a comprehensive guideline for the naming rules of non-cometary small Solar System bodies.

== 195001–195100 ==
Named minor planet	Provisional	This minor planet was named for...	Ref · Catalog
There are no named minor planets in this number range

== 195101–195200 ==
back to top

Named minor planet	Provisional	This minor planet was named for...	Ref · Catalog
195191 Constantinetsang	2002 CC_{281}	Constantine C. C. Tsang (born 1981) is a Senior Research Scientist at the Southwest Research Institute, and served as a Science Team Collaborator for imaging data analysis for the New Horizons mission to Pluto.	JPL · 195191

== 195201–195300 ==
back to top

Named minor planet	Provisional	This minor planet was named for...	Ref · Catalog
There are no named minor planets in this number range

== 195301–195400 ==
back to top

Named minor planet	Provisional	This minor planet was named for...	Ref · Catalog
There are no named minor planets in this number range

== 195401–195500 ==
back to top

Named minor planet	Provisional	This minor planet was named for...	Ref · Catalog
195405 Lentyler	2002 GQ_{27}	G. Leonard Tyler (born 1940), formerly of Stanford University, worked for the New Horizons mission to Pluto as a Science Team Co-investigator and as the REX instrument radio science principal investigator	JPL · 195405

== 195501–195600 ==
back to top

Named minor planet	Provisional	This minor planet was named for...	Ref · Catalog
195600 Scheithauer	2002 JH_{148}	Christian Friedrich Scheithauer (1771–1846), a German teacher and amateur astronomer from Chemnitz	JPL · 195600

== 195601–195700 ==
back to top

Named minor planet	Provisional	This minor planet was named for...	Ref · Catalog
195657 Zhuangqining	2002 NN_{60}	Zhuangqining (born 1945), a Chinese teacher and the first Secretary-General of the Ningbo Astronomy Amateur Association	JPL · 195657

== 195701–195800 ==
back to top

Named minor planet	Provisional	This minor planet was named for...	Ref · Catalog
195772 Shirleygrace	2002 PG_{133}	Shirley Grace Aguilar (b. 1957; née Cresser) is an American writer/editor who has demonstrated an unwavering support for astronomy and science education as a professional journalist on the New Horizons Pluto Mission and as editor of award-winning books on astronomy, with her enthusiasm for community science education.	IAU · 195772
195777 Sheepman	2002 PP_{154}	Sheepman, a fictional character featured in the novels A Wild Sheep Chase and Dance Dance Dance by Japanese writer Haruki Murakami. The Sheepman is a shabby but oracular creature and appears as an unshaven man dressed in sheepskin who instructs the protagonist to "dance so it all keeps spinning."	JPL · 195777

== 195801–195900 ==
back to top

Named minor planet	Provisional	This minor planet was named for...	Ref · Catalog
195853 Ouyangtianjing	2002 QA_{80}	Ouyang Tianjing (1944–2015), a Chinese amateur astronomer.	IAU · 195853
195900 Rogersudbury	2002 RS_{41}	Roger Sudbury (born 1938) provided leadership and expertise in the national security community since joining the Massachusetts Institute of Technology's Lincoln Laboratory in 1969. As a key senior leader at the Laboratory, he assisted in initiating the LINEAR Ceres Connection program.	JPL · 195900

== 195901–196000 ==
back to top

Named minor planet	Provisional	This minor planet was named for...	Ref · Catalog
195998 Skipwilson	2002 RO_{235}	Ivan "Skip" Wilson (born 1941), pioneer of systematic meteorite recovery	JPL · 195998
196000 Izzard	2002 RY_{237}	Eddie Izzard (born 1962), a British stand-up comic and dramatic actor	JPL · 196000

back to top

Preceded by 194,001–195,000	Meanings of minor-planet names List of minor planets: 195,001–196,000	Succeeded by 196,001–197,000
