= List of minor planets: 194001–195000 =

The following is a partial list of minor planets, running from minor-planet number 194001 through 195000, inclusive. The primary data for this and other partial lists is based on JPL's "Small-Body Orbital Elements" and data available from the Minor Planet Center. Critical list information is also provided by the MPC, unless otherwise specified from Lowell Observatory. A detailed description of the table's columns and additional sources are given on the main page including a complete list of every page in this series, and a statistical break-up on the dynamical classification of minor planets.

Also see the summary list of all named bodies in numerical and alphabetical order, and the corresponding naming citations for the number range of this particular list. New namings may only be added to this list after official publication, as the preannouncement of names is condemned by the Working Group for Small Bodies Nomenclature of the International Astronomical Union.

Near-Earth obj.	MBA (inner)	MBA (outer)	Centaur
Mars-crosser	MBA (middle)	Jupiter trojan	Trans-Neptunian obj.
Unclassified

== 194001–194100 ==
Designation			Discovery			Properties		Ref
Permanent	Provisional	Named after	Date	Site	Discoverer(s)	Category	Diam.	Ref
194001	2001 RV_{155}	—	September 12, 2001	Kitt Peak	Spacewatch	·	1.1 km	MPC · JPL
194002	2001 SG_{1}	—	September 17, 2001	Desert Eagle	W. K. Y. Yeung	·	1.2 km	MPC · JPL
194003	2001 SP_{2}	—	September 17, 2001	Desert Eagle	W. K. Y. Yeung	·	1.5 km	MPC · JPL
194004	2001 SB_{5}	—	September 18, 2001	Kleť	Kleť	·	1.8 km	MPC · JPL
194005	2001 SH_{5}	—	September 16, 2001	Socorro	LINEAR	PHO	2.8 km	MPC · JPL
194006	2001 SG_{10}	—	September 19, 2001	Anderson Mesa	LONEOS	APO · PHA	290 m	MPC · JPL
194007	2001 SX_{12}	—	September 16, 2001	Socorro	LINEAR	·	1.3 km	MPC · JPL
194008	2001 SE_{17}	—	September 16, 2001	Socorro	LINEAR	·	1.1 km	MPC · JPL
194009	2001 SE_{18}	—	September 16, 2001	Socorro	LINEAR	·	970 m	MPC · JPL
194010	2001 SC_{19}	—	September 16, 2001	Socorro	LINEAR	THM	3.5 km	MPC · JPL
194011	2001 SX_{20}	—	September 16, 2001	Socorro	LINEAR	·	1.3 km	MPC · JPL
194012	2001 SX_{25}	—	September 16, 2001	Socorro	LINEAR	·	2.3 km	MPC · JPL
194013	2001 SO_{27}	—	September 16, 2001	Socorro	LINEAR	·	850 m	MPC · JPL
194014	2001 SS_{28}	—	September 16, 2001	Socorro	LINEAR	·	1.1 km	MPC · JPL
194015	2001 SK_{29}	—	September 16, 2001	Socorro	LINEAR	·	890 m	MPC · JPL
194016	2001 SR_{30}	—	September 16, 2001	Socorro	LINEAR	·	1.4 km	MPC · JPL
194017	2001 SF_{33}	—	September 16, 2001	Socorro	LINEAR	·	970 m	MPC · JPL
194018	2001 SD_{34}	—	September 16, 2001	Socorro	LINEAR	·	1.1 km	MPC · JPL
194019	2001 SQ_{34}	—	September 16, 2001	Socorro	LINEAR	·	1.1 km	MPC · JPL
194020	2001 SF_{36}	—	September 16, 2001	Socorro	LINEAR	MAS	820 m	MPC · JPL
194021	2001 SG_{36}	—	September 16, 2001	Socorro	LINEAR	·	1.1 km	MPC · JPL
194022	2001 SC_{38}	—	September 16, 2001	Socorro	LINEAR	·	4.7 km	MPC · JPL
194023	2001 SW_{39}	—	September 16, 2001	Socorro	LINEAR	·	1.6 km	MPC · JPL
194024	2001 SJ_{40}	—	September 16, 2001	Socorro	LINEAR	·	1.4 km	MPC · JPL
194025	2001 SN_{50}	—	September 16, 2001	Socorro	LINEAR	(2076)	910 m	MPC · JPL
194026	2001 SG_{51}	—	September 16, 2001	Socorro	LINEAR	NYS	1.0 km	MPC · JPL
194027	2001 SH_{58}	—	September 17, 2001	Socorro	LINEAR	·	1.3 km	MPC · JPL
194028	2001 SQ_{62}	—	September 17, 2001	Socorro	LINEAR	·	1.3 km	MPC · JPL
194029	2001 SK_{64}	—	September 17, 2001	Socorro	LINEAR	·	980 m	MPC · JPL
194030	2001 SN_{70}	—	September 17, 2001	Socorro	LINEAR	·	1.8 km	MPC · JPL
194031	2001 SQ_{75}	—	September 19, 2001	Anderson Mesa	LONEOS	·	1.2 km	MPC · JPL
194032	2001 SV_{77}	—	September 19, 2001	Socorro	LINEAR	PHO	1.5 km	MPC · JPL
194033	2001 SD_{78}	—	September 19, 2001	Socorro	LINEAR	·	1.1 km	MPC · JPL
194034	2001 SU_{78}	—	September 19, 2001	Socorro	LINEAR	·	1.1 km	MPC · JPL
194035	2001 SU_{81}	—	September 20, 2001	Socorro	LINEAR	·	1.3 km	MPC · JPL
194036	2001 SA_{84}	—	September 20, 2001	Socorro	LINEAR	·	1.1 km	MPC · JPL
194037	2001 SW_{84}	—	September 20, 2001	Socorro	LINEAR	·	960 m	MPC · JPL
194038	2001 SV_{87}	—	September 20, 2001	Socorro	LINEAR	CYB	6.9 km	MPC · JPL
194039	2001 SF_{88}	—	September 20, 2001	Socorro	LINEAR	·	1.4 km	MPC · JPL
194040	2001 SY_{91}	—	September 20, 2001	Socorro	LINEAR	·	1.5 km	MPC · JPL
194041	2001 SZ_{93}	—	September 20, 2001	Socorro	LINEAR	·	1.5 km	MPC · JPL
194042	2001 SL_{95}	—	September 20, 2001	Socorro	LINEAR	·	980 m	MPC · JPL
194043	2001 SJ_{98}	—	September 20, 2001	Socorro	LINEAR	NYS	1.4 km	MPC · JPL
194044	2001 SV_{98}	—	September 20, 2001	Socorro	LINEAR	·	1.8 km	MPC · JPL
194045	2001 SV_{99}	—	September 20, 2001	Socorro	LINEAR	V	790 m	MPC · JPL
194046	2001 SB_{100}	—	September 20, 2001	Socorro	LINEAR	·	1.0 km	MPC · JPL
194047	2001 ST_{100}	—	September 20, 2001	Socorro	LINEAR	·	1.1 km	MPC · JPL
194048	2001 SK_{102}	—	September 20, 2001	Socorro	LINEAR	·	630 m	MPC · JPL
194049	2001 SD_{105}	—	September 20, 2001	Socorro	LINEAR	·	2.0 km	MPC · JPL
194050	2001 SF_{105}	—	September 20, 2001	Socorro	LINEAR	·	940 m	MPC · JPL
194051	2001 SV_{106}	—	September 20, 2001	Socorro	LINEAR	(2076)	1.5 km	MPC · JPL
194052	2001 SY_{106}	—	September 20, 2001	Socorro	LINEAR	·	1.6 km	MPC · JPL
194053	2001 SX_{116}	—	September 16, 2001	Socorro	LINEAR	·	1.2 km	MPC · JPL
194054	2001 SX_{117}	—	September 16, 2001	Socorro	LINEAR	·	1.1 km	MPC · JPL
194055	2001 SS_{118}	—	September 16, 2001	Socorro	LINEAR	·	980 m	MPC · JPL
194056	2001 SW_{121}	—	September 16, 2001	Socorro	LINEAR	·	1.3 km	MPC · JPL
194057	2001 SX_{122}	—	September 16, 2001	Socorro	LINEAR	·	1.3 km	MPC · JPL
194058	2001 SA_{123}	—	September 16, 2001	Socorro	LINEAR	·	1.0 km	MPC · JPL
194059	2001 SY_{123}	—	September 16, 2001	Socorro	LINEAR	·	2.1 km	MPC · JPL
194060	2001 SQ_{125}	—	September 16, 2001	Socorro	LINEAR	·	1.6 km	MPC · JPL
194061	2001 SS_{125}	—	September 16, 2001	Socorro	LINEAR	·	1.0 km	MPC · JPL
194062	2001 SS_{126}	—	September 16, 2001	Socorro	LINEAR	·	1.4 km	MPC · JPL
194063	2001 SL_{128}	—	September 16, 2001	Socorro	LINEAR	·	1.3 km	MPC · JPL
194064	2001 SG_{129}	—	September 16, 2001	Socorro	LINEAR	·	990 m	MPC · JPL
194065	2001 SX_{129}	—	September 16, 2001	Socorro	LINEAR	·	1.1 km	MPC · JPL
194066	2001 SE_{130}	—	September 16, 2001	Socorro	LINEAR	·	1.1 km	MPC · JPL
194067	2001 SQ_{139}	—	September 16, 2001	Socorro	LINEAR	SYL · CYB	6.5 km	MPC · JPL
194068	2001 SB_{140}	—	September 16, 2001	Socorro	LINEAR	·	960 m	MPC · JPL
194069	2001 SP_{141}	—	September 16, 2001	Socorro	LINEAR	·	1.1 km	MPC · JPL
194070	2001 SM_{142}	—	September 16, 2001	Socorro	LINEAR	·	1.2 km	MPC · JPL
194071	2001 SL_{144}	—	September 16, 2001	Socorro	LINEAR	·	970 m	MPC · JPL
194072	2001 SO_{144}	—	September 16, 2001	Socorro	LINEAR	·	1.1 km	MPC · JPL
194073	2001 SY_{144}	—	September 16, 2001	Socorro	LINEAR	·	1.4 km	MPC · JPL
194074	2001 SO_{145}	—	September 16, 2001	Socorro	LINEAR	·	1.3 km	MPC · JPL
194075	2001 SW_{146}	—	September 16, 2001	Socorro	LINEAR	·	870 m	MPC · JPL
194076	2001 SP_{148}	—	September 17, 2001	Socorro	LINEAR	·	1.5 km	MPC · JPL
194077	2001 SN_{149}	—	September 17, 2001	Socorro	LINEAR	·	1.7 km	MPC · JPL
194078	2001 SW_{150}	—	September 17, 2001	Socorro	LINEAR	V	980 m	MPC · JPL
194079	2001 SB_{153}	—	September 17, 2001	Socorro	LINEAR	V	960 m	MPC · JPL
194080	2001 SE_{156}	—	September 17, 2001	Socorro	LINEAR	·	1.3 km	MPC · JPL
194081	2001 SM_{156}	—	September 17, 2001	Socorro	LINEAR	·	1.5 km	MPC · JPL
194082	2001 SK_{157}	—	September 17, 2001	Socorro	LINEAR	·	1.4 km	MPC · JPL
194083	2001 SP_{159}	—	September 17, 2001	Socorro	LINEAR	·	1.6 km	MPC · JPL
194084	2001 SP_{163}	—	September 17, 2001	Socorro	LINEAR	·	1.3 km	MPC · JPL
194085	2001 SG_{166}	—	September 19, 2001	Socorro	LINEAR	·	970 m	MPC · JPL
194086	2001 SP_{167}	—	September 19, 2001	Socorro	LINEAR	V	870 m	MPC · JPL
194087	2001 ST_{168}	—	September 19, 2001	Socorro	LINEAR	·	1.5 km	MPC · JPL
194088	2001 SQ_{171}	—	September 16, 2001	Socorro	LINEAR	·	1.4 km	MPC · JPL
194089	2001 SE_{174}	—	September 16, 2001	Socorro	LINEAR	·	1.3 km	MPC · JPL
194090	2001 SH_{176}	—	September 16, 2001	Socorro	LINEAR	·	2.0 km	MPC · JPL
194091	2001 SH_{182}	—	September 19, 2001	Socorro	LINEAR	·	850 m	MPC · JPL
194092	2001 SG_{186}	—	September 19, 2001	Socorro	LINEAR	·	970 m	MPC · JPL
194093	2001 SA_{199}	—	September 19, 2001	Socorro	LINEAR	·	790 m	MPC · JPL
194094	2001 SG_{201}	—	September 19, 2001	Socorro	LINEAR	·	1.4 km	MPC · JPL
194095	2001 SS_{204}	—	September 19, 2001	Socorro	LINEAR	·	1.3 km	MPC · JPL
194096	2001 SS_{206}	—	September 19, 2001	Socorro	LINEAR	·	1.1 km	MPC · JPL
194097	2001 SB_{207}	—	September 19, 2001	Socorro	LINEAR	·	1.2 km	MPC · JPL
194098	2001 SV_{208}	—	September 19, 2001	Socorro	LINEAR	·	990 m	MPC · JPL
194099	2001 SW_{208}	—	September 19, 2001	Socorro	LINEAR	·	1.1 km	MPC · JPL
194100	2001 SG_{210}	—	September 19, 2001	Socorro	LINEAR	·	1.4 km	MPC · JPL

== 194101–194200 ==
back to top

Designation			Discovery			Properties		Ref
Permanent	Provisional	Named after	Date	Site	Discoverer(s)	Category	Diam.	Ref
194101	2001 SE_{212}	—	September 19, 2001	Socorro	LINEAR	·	710 m	MPC · JPL
194102	2001 SX_{212}	—	September 19, 2001	Socorro	LINEAR	·	840 m	MPC · JPL
194103	2001 SW_{214}	—	September 19, 2001	Socorro	LINEAR	·	1.1 km	MPC · JPL
194104	2001 SF_{215}	—	September 19, 2001	Socorro	LINEAR	·	1.2 km	MPC · JPL
194105	2001 SJ_{222}	—	September 19, 2001	Socorro	LINEAR	·	970 m	MPC · JPL
194106	2001 SY_{223}	—	September 19, 2001	Socorro	LINEAR	·	1.2 km	MPC · JPL
194107	2001 SG_{225}	—	September 19, 2001	Socorro	LINEAR	·	1.5 km	MPC · JPL
194108	2001 SH_{230}	—	September 19, 2001	Socorro	LINEAR	NYS	1.3 km	MPC · JPL
194109	2001 SX_{231}	—	September 19, 2001	Socorro	LINEAR	·	1.4 km	MPC · JPL
194110	2001 SW_{233}	—	September 19, 2001	Socorro	LINEAR	·	1.5 km	MPC · JPL
194111	2001 SK_{236}	—	September 19, 2001	Socorro	LINEAR	·	700 m	MPC · JPL
194112	2001 SF_{237}	—	September 19, 2001	Socorro	LINEAR	·	1.1 km	MPC · JPL
194113	2001 SU_{243}	—	September 19, 2001	Socorro	LINEAR	·	1.3 km	MPC · JPL
194114	2001 SB_{249}	—	September 19, 2001	Socorro	LINEAR	·	1.6 km	MPC · JPL
194115	2001 SL_{249}	—	September 19, 2001	Socorro	LINEAR	·	2.3 km	MPC · JPL
194116	2001 SS_{250}	—	September 19, 2001	Socorro	LINEAR	NYS	1.4 km	MPC · JPL
194117	2001 SV_{253}	—	September 19, 2001	Socorro	LINEAR	·	1.2 km	MPC · JPL
194118	2001 SM_{257}	—	September 19, 2001	Socorro	LINEAR	MAS	1.1 km	MPC · JPL
194119	2001 SN_{258}	—	September 20, 2001	Socorro	LINEAR	EOS	3.1 km	MPC · JPL
194120	2001 SE_{261}	—	September 20, 2001	Socorro	LINEAR	·	1.3 km	MPC · JPL
194121	2001 SO_{261}	—	September 20, 2001	Socorro	LINEAR	V	1.3 km	MPC · JPL
194122	2001 SU_{262}	—	September 24, 2001	Socorro	LINEAR	PHO	2.1 km	MPC · JPL
194123	2001 SA_{263}	—	September 24, 2001	Socorro	LINEAR	PHO	2.8 km	MPC · JPL
194124	2001 SD_{263}	—	September 25, 2001	Emerald Lane	L. Ball	·	1.7 km	MPC · JPL
194125	2001 SV_{266}	—	September 25, 2001	Desert Eagle	W. K. Y. Yeung	·	1.2 km	MPC · JPL
194126	2001 SG_{276}	—	September 26, 2001	Anderson Mesa	LONEOS	AMO +1km	950 m	MPC · JPL
194127	2001 SF_{281}	—	September 21, 2001	Anderson Mesa	LONEOS	·	1.6 km	MPC · JPL
194128	2001 SP_{281}	—	September 21, 2001	Anderson Mesa	LONEOS	·	1.4 km	MPC · JPL
194129	2001 SO_{285}	—	September 22, 2001	Kitt Peak	Spacewatch	·	1.8 km	MPC · JPL
194130	2001 SJ_{293}	—	September 19, 2001	Socorro	LINEAR	·	1.2 km	MPC · JPL
194131	2001 SE_{299}	—	September 20, 2001	Socorro	LINEAR	CYB	5.8 km	MPC · JPL
194132	2001 SX_{300}	—	September 20, 2001	Socorro	LINEAR	·	1.0 km	MPC · JPL
194133	2001 SG_{301}	—	September 20, 2001	Socorro	LINEAR	·	890 m	MPC · JPL
194134	2001 SY_{312}	—	September 21, 2001	Socorro	LINEAR	·	1.2 km	MPC · JPL
194135	2001 SJ_{314}	—	September 22, 2001	Socorro	LINEAR	·	2.3 km	MPC · JPL
194136	2001 SD_{315}	—	September 25, 2001	Socorro	LINEAR	·	3.0 km	MPC · JPL
194137	2001 SF_{315}	—	September 25, 2001	Socorro	LINEAR	PHO	3.4 km	MPC · JPL
194138	2001 SX_{318}	—	September 21, 2001	Socorro	LINEAR	·	890 m	MPC · JPL
194139	2001 SQ_{321}	—	September 25, 2001	Socorro	LINEAR	V	990 m	MPC · JPL
194140	2001 ST_{323}	—	September 25, 2001	Socorro	LINEAR	·	1.8 km	MPC · JPL
194141	2001 SB_{324}	—	September 26, 2001	Socorro	LINEAR	V	1.0 km	MPC · JPL
194142	2001 SW_{324}	—	September 16, 2001	Socorro	LINEAR	·	5.2 km	MPC · JPL
194143	2001 SP_{326}	—	September 18, 2001	Anderson Mesa	LONEOS	V	1.1 km	MPC · JPL
194144	2001 SE_{328}	—	September 19, 2001	Kitt Peak	Spacewatch	(2076)	860 m	MPC · JPL
194145	2001 SC_{337}	—	September 20, 2001	Socorro	LINEAR	·	810 m	MPC · JPL
194146	2001 SE_{337}	—	September 20, 2001	Socorro	LINEAR	·	850 m	MPC · JPL
194147	2001 SW_{349}	—	September 19, 2001	Socorro	LINEAR	(260) · CYB	6.1 km	MPC · JPL
194148	2001 SP_{350}	—	September 26, 2001	Desert Eagle	W. K. Y. Yeung	·	1.0 km	MPC · JPL
194149	2001 TJ	—	October 6, 2001	Palomar	NEAT	·	960 m	MPC · JPL
194150	2001 TF_{4}	—	October 7, 2001	Palomar	NEAT	·	1.2 km	MPC · JPL
194151	2001 TT_{6}	—	October 10, 2001	Palomar	NEAT	·	1.5 km	MPC · JPL
194152	2001 TW_{7}	—	October 11, 2001	Desert Eagle	W. K. Y. Yeung	·	1.4 km	MPC · JPL
194153	2001 TW_{9}	—	October 13, 2001	Socorro	LINEAR	·	1.0 km	MPC · JPL
194154	2001 TA_{10}	—	October 13, 2001	Socorro	LINEAR	·	1.1 km	MPC · JPL
194155	2001 TE_{11}	—	October 13, 2001	Socorro	LINEAR	·	1.3 km	MPC · JPL
194156	2001 TL_{11}	—	October 13, 2001	Socorro	LINEAR	·	1.0 km	MPC · JPL
194157	2001 TK_{12}	—	October 13, 2001	Socorro	LINEAR	ERI	2.9 km	MPC · JPL
194158	2001 TH_{16}	—	October 11, 2001	Socorro	LINEAR	·	1.7 km	MPC · JPL
194159	2001 TN_{18}	—	October 14, 2001	Desert Eagle	W. K. Y. Yeung	·	1.8 km	MPC · JPL
194160	2001 TO_{18}	—	October 14, 2001	Desert Eagle	W. K. Y. Yeung	·	1.3 km	MPC · JPL
194161	2001 TQ_{19}	—	October 9, 2001	Socorro	LINEAR	·	1.5 km	MPC · JPL
194162	2001 TK_{22}	—	October 13, 2001	Socorro	LINEAR	NYS	990 m	MPC · JPL
194163	2001 TV_{22}	—	October 13, 2001	Socorro	LINEAR	·	1.0 km	MPC · JPL
194164	2001 TE_{23}	—	October 13, 2001	Socorro	LINEAR	NYS	1.6 km	MPC · JPL
194165	2001 TQ_{26}	—	October 14, 2001	Socorro	LINEAR	·	1.8 km	MPC · JPL
194166	2001 TC_{28}	—	October 14, 2001	Socorro	LINEAR	·	1.9 km	MPC · JPL
194167	2001 TC_{31}	—	October 14, 2001	Socorro	LINEAR	·	2.5 km	MPC · JPL
194168	2001 TA_{32}	—	October 14, 2001	Socorro	LINEAR	·	2.5 km	MPC · JPL
194169	2001 TC_{32}	—	October 14, 2001	Socorro	LINEAR	·	2.0 km	MPC · JPL
194170	2001 TG_{36}	—	October 14, 2001	Socorro	LINEAR	·	1.8 km	MPC · JPL
194171	2001 TW_{37}	—	October 14, 2001	Socorro	LINEAR	·	2.6 km	MPC · JPL
194172	2001 TU_{38}	—	October 14, 2001	Socorro	LINEAR	·	2.7 km	MPC · JPL
194173	2001 TM_{44}	—	October 14, 2001	Socorro	LINEAR	·	2.3 km	MPC · JPL
194174	2001 TY_{49}	—	October 13, 2001	Socorro	LINEAR	·	1.1 km	MPC · JPL
194175	2001 TB_{51}	—	October 13, 2001	Socorro	LINEAR	·	930 m	MPC · JPL
194176	2001 TR_{51}	—	October 13, 2001	Socorro	LINEAR	·	1.5 km	MPC · JPL
194177	2001 TD_{53}	—	October 13, 2001	Socorro	LINEAR	NYS	1.4 km	MPC · JPL
194178	2001 TF_{54}	—	October 14, 2001	Socorro	LINEAR	PHO	1.2 km	MPC · JPL
194179	2001 TY_{57}	—	October 13, 2001	Socorro	LINEAR	·	1.1 km	MPC · JPL
194180	2001 TF_{59}	—	October 13, 2001	Socorro	LINEAR	·	1.3 km	MPC · JPL
194181	2001 TN_{59}	—	October 13, 2001	Socorro	LINEAR	·	1.8 km	MPC · JPL
194182	2001 TC_{60}	—	October 13, 2001	Socorro	LINEAR	NYS	2.7 km	MPC · JPL
194183	2001 TJ_{62}	—	October 13, 2001	Socorro	LINEAR	·	1.3 km	MPC · JPL
194184	2001 TM_{63}	—	October 13, 2001	Socorro	LINEAR	·	1.3 km	MPC · JPL
194185	2001 TV_{65}	—	October 13, 2001	Socorro	LINEAR	·	1.7 km	MPC · JPL
194186	2001 TE_{66}	—	October 13, 2001	Socorro	LINEAR	·	1.6 km	MPC · JPL
194187	2001 TH_{69}	—	October 13, 2001	Socorro	LINEAR	·	1.7 km	MPC · JPL
194188	2001 TV_{69}	—	October 13, 2001	Socorro	LINEAR	·	1.4 km	MPC · JPL
194189	2001 TQ_{70}	—	October 13, 2001	Socorro	LINEAR	·	1.3 km	MPC · JPL
194190	2001 TU_{73}	—	October 13, 2001	Socorro	LINEAR	NYS	1.4 km	MPC · JPL
194191	2001 TG_{75}	—	October 13, 2001	Socorro	LINEAR	·	930 m	MPC · JPL
194192	2001 TE_{78}	—	October 13, 2001	Socorro	LINEAR	·	2.0 km	MPC · JPL
194193	2001 TA_{81}	—	October 14, 2001	Socorro	LINEAR	V	990 m	MPC · JPL
194194	2001 TL_{81}	—	October 14, 2001	Socorro	LINEAR	·	1.3 km	MPC · JPL
194195	2001 TK_{82}	—	October 14, 2001	Socorro	LINEAR	V	1.0 km	MPC · JPL
194196	2001 TV_{82}	—	October 14, 2001	Socorro	LINEAR	PHO	1.0 km	MPC · JPL
194197	2001 TN_{85}	—	October 14, 2001	Socorro	LINEAR	·	1.3 km	MPC · JPL
194198	2001 TX_{85}	—	October 14, 2001	Socorro	LINEAR	·	1.4 km	MPC · JPL
194199	2001 TE_{88}	—	October 14, 2001	Socorro	LINEAR	·	910 m	MPC · JPL
194200	2001 TS_{90}	—	October 14, 2001	Socorro	LINEAR	·	1.5 km	MPC · JPL

== 194201–194300 ==
back to top

Designation			Discovery			Properties		Ref
Permanent	Provisional	Named after	Date	Site	Discoverer(s)	Category	Diam.	Ref
194201	2001 TQ_{91}	—	October 14, 2001	Socorro	LINEAR	·	860 m	MPC · JPL
194202	2001 TE_{93}	—	October 14, 2001	Socorro	LINEAR	·	1.6 km	MPC · JPL
194203	2001 TE_{97}	—	October 14, 2001	Socorro	LINEAR	·	1.5 km	MPC · JPL
194204	2001 TE_{98}	—	October 14, 2001	Socorro	LINEAR	·	2.0 km	MPC · JPL
194205	2001 TV_{98}	—	October 14, 2001	Socorro	LINEAR	V	950 m	MPC · JPL
194206	2001 TD_{99}	—	October 14, 2001	Socorro	LINEAR	·	1.1 km	MPC · JPL
194207	2001 TG_{99}	—	October 14, 2001	Socorro	LINEAR	3:2	9.7 km	MPC · JPL
194208	2001 TT_{101}	—	October 15, 2001	Socorro	LINEAR	·	1.3 km	MPC · JPL
194209	2001 TJ_{104}	—	October 15, 2001	Desert Eagle	W. K. Y. Yeung	NYS	1.2 km	MPC · JPL
194210	2001 TW_{110}	—	October 14, 2001	Socorro	LINEAR	·	970 m	MPC · JPL
194211	2001 TE_{111}	—	October 14, 2001	Socorro	LINEAR	·	1.6 km	MPC · JPL
194212	2001 TH_{114}	—	October 14, 2001	Socorro	LINEAR	·	1.0 km	MPC · JPL
194213	2001 TA_{123}	—	October 12, 2001	Anderson Mesa	LONEOS	PHO	1.6 km	MPC · JPL
194214	2001 TD_{124}	—	October 12, 2001	Haleakala	NEAT	·	1.5 km	MPC · JPL
194215	2001 TE_{124}	—	October 12, 2001	Haleakala	NEAT	·	8.2 km	MPC · JPL
194216	2001 TM_{133}	—	October 12, 2001	Haleakala	NEAT	·	970 m	MPC · JPL
194217	2001 TW_{133}	—	October 12, 2001	Haleakala	NEAT	·	1.4 km	MPC · JPL
194218	2001 TU_{135}	—	October 13, 2001	Palomar	NEAT	V	920 m	MPC · JPL
194219	2001 TD_{137}	—	October 14, 2001	Palomar	NEAT	·	1.5 km	MPC · JPL
194220	2001 TK_{139}	—	October 10, 2001	Palomar	NEAT	·	1.4 km	MPC · JPL
194221	2001 TN_{141}	—	October 10, 2001	Palomar	NEAT	(2076)	1.0 km	MPC · JPL
194222	2001 TX_{143}	—	October 10, 2001	Palomar	NEAT	V	780 m	MPC · JPL
194223	2001 TE_{145}	—	October 10, 2001	Palomar	NEAT	·	1.1 km	MPC · JPL
194224	2001 TR_{145}	—	October 10, 2001	Palomar	NEAT	(2076)	1.2 km	MPC · JPL
194225	2001 TX_{145}	—	October 10, 2001	Palomar	NEAT	CYB	5.8 km	MPC · JPL
194226	2001 TQ_{147}	—	October 10, 2001	Palomar	NEAT	·	1.3 km	MPC · JPL
194227	2001 TW_{147}	—	October 10, 2001	Palomar	NEAT	·	1.1 km	MPC · JPL
194228	2001 TL_{150}	—	October 10, 2001	Palomar	NEAT	·	1.3 km	MPC · JPL
194229	2001 TR_{150}	—	October 10, 2001	Palomar	NEAT	V	690 m	MPC · JPL
194230	2001 TF_{152}	—	October 10, 2001	Palomar	NEAT	·	1.6 km	MPC · JPL
194231	2001 TW_{154}	—	October 15, 2001	Palomar	NEAT	·	1.3 km	MPC · JPL
194232	2001 TR_{157}	—	October 14, 2001	Kitt Peak	Spacewatch	NYS	1.7 km	MPC · JPL
194233	2001 TY_{157}	—	October 10, 2001	Palomar	NEAT	·	1.6 km	MPC · JPL
194234	2001 TU_{160}	—	October 15, 2001	Kitt Peak	Spacewatch	·	1.2 km	MPC · JPL
194235	2001 TT_{163}	—	October 11, 2001	Palomar	NEAT	(2076)	1.1 km	MPC · JPL
194236	2001 TA_{164}	—	October 11, 2001	Palomar	NEAT	·	1.1 km	MPC · JPL
194237	2001 TV_{165}	—	October 14, 2001	Socorro	LINEAR	·	2.3 km	MPC · JPL
194238	2001 TB_{166}	—	October 14, 2001	Socorro	LINEAR	·	2.0 km	MPC · JPL
194239	2001 TV_{175}	—	October 14, 2001	Socorro	LINEAR	·	1.4 km	MPC · JPL
194240	2001 TT_{178}	—	October 14, 2001	Socorro	LINEAR	V	920 m	MPC · JPL
194241	2001 TO_{179}	—	October 14, 2001	Socorro	LINEAR	·	1.9 km	MPC · JPL
194242	2001 TG_{189}	—	October 14, 2001	Socorro	LINEAR	·	1.4 km	MPC · JPL
194243	2001 TQ_{190}	—	October 14, 2001	Socorro	LINEAR	·	1.7 km	MPC · JPL
194244	2001 TX_{190}	—	October 14, 2001	Socorro	LINEAR	·	1.6 km	MPC · JPL
194245	2001 TZ_{190}	—	October 14, 2001	Socorro	LINEAR	(2076)	1.3 km	MPC · JPL
194246	2001 TG_{192}	—	October 14, 2001	Socorro	LINEAR	·	1.4 km	MPC · JPL
194247	2001 TM_{195}	—	October 15, 2001	Palomar	NEAT	PHO	1.3 km	MPC · JPL
194248	2001 TA_{199}	—	October 11, 2001	Socorro	LINEAR	V	1.4 km	MPC · JPL
194249	2001 TL_{199}	—	October 11, 2001	Socorro	LINEAR	·	1.1 km	MPC · JPL
194250	2001 TB_{204}	—	October 11, 2001	Socorro	LINEAR	·	1.9 km	MPC · JPL
194251	2001 TS_{204}	—	October 11, 2001	Socorro	LINEAR	·	1.2 km	MPC · JPL
194252	2001 TX_{205}	—	October 11, 2001	Socorro	LINEAR	PHO	1.5 km	MPC · JPL
194253	2001 TW_{212}	—	October 13, 2001	Anderson Mesa	LONEOS	·	2.1 km	MPC · JPL
194254	2001 TF_{224}	—	October 14, 2001	Socorro	LINEAR	·	1.4 km	MPC · JPL
194255	2001 TU_{227}	—	October 15, 2001	Socorro	LINEAR	·	1.0 km	MPC · JPL
194256	2001 TH_{230}	—	October 15, 2001	Palomar	NEAT	·	1.4 km	MPC · JPL
194257	2001 TW_{231}	—	October 15, 2001	Kitt Peak	Spacewatch	·	1.0 km	MPC · JPL
194258	2001 TG_{235}	—	October 15, 2001	Palomar	NEAT	·	1.1 km	MPC · JPL
194259	2001 TQ_{237}	—	October 10, 2001	Palomar	NEAT	·	2.6 km	MPC · JPL
194260	2001 TC_{240}	—	October 10, 2001	Palomar	NEAT	NYS	1.3 km	MPC · JPL
194261	2001 TP_{250}	—	October 14, 2001	Apache Point	SDSS	·	1.0 km	MPC · JPL
194262 Nové Zámky	2001 TE_{257}	Nové Zámky	October 10, 2001	Palomar	NEAT	·	1.1 km	MPC · JPL
194263	2001 UL	—	October 16, 2001	Socorro	LINEAR	PHO	1.5 km	MPC · JPL
194264	2001 UY	—	October 17, 2001	Socorro	LINEAR	·	1.9 km	MPC · JPL
194265	2001 UB_{1}	—	October 17, 2001	Desert Eagle	W. K. Y. Yeung	·	1.2 km	MPC · JPL
194266	2001 UV_{1}	—	October 17, 2001	Socorro	LINEAR	PHO	1.7 km	MPC · JPL
194267	2001 UU_{3}	—	October 16, 2001	Socorro	LINEAR	·	1.3 km	MPC · JPL
194268	2001 UY_{4}	—	October 16, 2001	Socorro	LINEAR	APO +1km · PHA	1.2 km	MPC · JPL
194269	2001 UU_{7}	—	October 17, 2001	Socorro	LINEAR	·	1.3 km	MPC · JPL
194270	2001 UT_{10}	—	October 21, 2001	Desert Eagle	W. K. Y. Yeung	V	980 m	MPC · JPL
194271	2001 UN_{12}	—	October 24, 2001	Desert Eagle	W. K. Y. Yeung	V	990 m	MPC · JPL
194272	2001 UU_{12}	—	October 24, 2001	Desert Eagle	W. K. Y. Yeung	·	1.9 km	MPC · JPL
194273	2001 UH_{13}	—	October 24, 2001	Desert Eagle	W. K. Y. Yeung	·	1.1 km	MPC · JPL
194274	2001 UL_{16}	—	October 25, 2001	Eskridge	G. Hug	·	2.4 km	MPC · JPL
194275	2001 UJ_{21}	—	October 17, 2001	Socorro	LINEAR	PHO	1.6 km	MPC · JPL
194276	2001 UJ_{24}	—	October 18, 2001	Socorro	LINEAR	·	1.3 km	MPC · JPL
194277	2001 UC_{28}	—	October 16, 2001	Socorro	LINEAR	·	890 m	MPC · JPL
194278	2001 UN_{29}	—	October 16, 2001	Socorro	LINEAR	·	1.8 km	MPC · JPL
194279	2001 UX_{30}	—	October 16, 2001	Socorro	LINEAR	·	1.3 km	MPC · JPL
194280	2001 UC_{33}	—	October 16, 2001	Socorro	LINEAR	·	1.1 km	MPC · JPL
194281	2001 UP_{35}	—	October 16, 2001	Socorro	LINEAR	·	1.9 km	MPC · JPL
194282	2001 UE_{42}	—	October 17, 2001	Socorro	LINEAR	·	1.5 km	MPC · JPL
194283	2001 UZ_{42}	—	October 17, 2001	Socorro	LINEAR	·	1.8 km	MPC · JPL
194284	2001 UB_{47}	—	October 17, 2001	Socorro	LINEAR	·	1.3 km	MPC · JPL
194285	2001 UL_{47}	—	October 17, 2001	Socorro	LINEAR	·	1.3 km	MPC · JPL
194286	2001 UF_{49}	—	October 17, 2001	Socorro	LINEAR	·	1.1 km	MPC · JPL
194287	2001 UL_{49}	—	October 17, 2001	Socorro	LINEAR	·	1.7 km	MPC · JPL
194288	2001 UU_{49}	—	October 17, 2001	Socorro	LINEAR	·	1.5 km	MPC · JPL
194289	2001 UN_{52}	—	October 17, 2001	Socorro	LINEAR	NYS	1.4 km	MPC · JPL
194290	2001 UP_{52}	—	October 17, 2001	Socorro	LINEAR	·	1.5 km	MPC · JPL
194291	2001 UC_{54}	—	October 17, 2001	Socorro	LINEAR	·	3.8 km	MPC · JPL
194292	2001 UC_{55}	—	October 16, 2001	Socorro	LINEAR	·	1.3 km	MPC · JPL
194293	2001 UE_{60}	—	October 17, 2001	Socorro	LINEAR	·	1.1 km	MPC · JPL
194294	2001 UH_{60}	—	October 17, 2001	Socorro	LINEAR	V	1.1 km	MPC · JPL
194295	2001 UK_{60}	—	October 17, 2001	Socorro	LINEAR	V	820 m	MPC · JPL
194296	2001 US_{61}	—	October 17, 2001	Socorro	LINEAR	·	1.1 km	MPC · JPL
194297	2001 UG_{62}	—	October 17, 2001	Socorro	LINEAR	·	950 m	MPC · JPL
194298	2001 UA_{63}	—	October 17, 2001	Socorro	LINEAR	·	1.3 km	MPC · JPL
194299	2001 UJ_{64}	—	October 18, 2001	Socorro	LINEAR	·	1.4 km	MPC · JPL
194300	2001 UO_{64}	—	October 18, 2001	Socorro	LINEAR	·	1.7 km	MPC · JPL

== 194301–194400 ==
back to top

Designation			Discovery			Properties		Ref
Permanent	Provisional	Named after	Date	Site	Discoverer(s)	Category	Diam.	Ref
194301	2001 UP_{65}	—	October 18, 2001	Socorro	LINEAR	·	1.7 km	MPC · JPL
194302	2001 UU_{65}	—	October 18, 2001	Socorro	LINEAR	ERI	3.2 km	MPC · JPL
194303	2001 UB_{67}	—	October 20, 2001	Socorro	LINEAR	·	1.2 km	MPC · JPL
194304	2001 UV_{71}	—	October 20, 2001	Kitt Peak	Spacewatch	·	1.4 km	MPC · JPL
194305	2001 UR_{75}	—	October 17, 2001	Socorro	LINEAR	·	1.4 km	MPC · JPL
194306	2001 UW_{75}	—	October 17, 2001	Socorro	LINEAR	·	1.3 km	MPC · JPL
194307	2001 UW_{78}	—	October 20, 2001	Socorro	LINEAR	NYS	1.4 km	MPC · JPL
194308	2001 UF_{82}	—	October 20, 2001	Socorro	LINEAR	·	1.5 km	MPC · JPL
194309	2001 UR_{85}	—	October 16, 2001	Kitt Peak	Spacewatch	NYS	1.1 km	MPC · JPL
194310	2001 UE_{87}	—	October 18, 2001	Kitt Peak	Spacewatch	CLA	2.4 km	MPC · JPL
194311	2001 UR_{89}	—	October 25, 2001	Socorro	LINEAR	PHO	1.5 km	MPC · JPL
194312	2001 UJ_{92}	—	October 18, 2001	Palomar	NEAT	NYS	1.2 km	MPC · JPL
194313	2001 UW_{92}	—	October 19, 2001	Palomar	NEAT	·	1.2 km	MPC · JPL
194314	2001 UH_{95}	—	October 19, 2001	Palomar	NEAT	·	3.4 km	MPC · JPL
194315	2001 UQ_{98}	—	October 17, 2001	Socorro	LINEAR	·	870 m	MPC · JPL
194316	2001 UV_{110}	—	October 21, 2001	Socorro	LINEAR	NYS	1.6 km	MPC · JPL
194317	2001 UR_{111}	—	October 21, 2001	Socorro	LINEAR	·	920 m	MPC · JPL
194318	2001 UE_{115}	—	October 22, 2001	Socorro	LINEAR	·	2.1 km	MPC · JPL
194319	2001 UF_{115}	—	October 22, 2001	Socorro	LINEAR	NYS	1.3 km	MPC · JPL
194320	2001 UM_{115}	—	October 22, 2001	Socorro	LINEAR	NYS	1.6 km	MPC · JPL
194321	2001 UH_{117}	—	October 22, 2001	Socorro	LINEAR	·	1.6 km	MPC · JPL
194322	2001 UR_{117}	—	October 22, 2001	Socorro	LINEAR	·	1.3 km	MPC · JPL
194323	2001 UV_{117}	—	October 22, 2001	Socorro	LINEAR	·	1.6 km	MPC · JPL
194324	2001 UL_{118}	—	October 22, 2001	Socorro	LINEAR	NYS	1.4 km	MPC · JPL
194325	2001 UP_{120}	—	October 22, 2001	Socorro	LINEAR	V	710 m	MPC · JPL
194326	2001 UA_{122}	—	October 22, 2001	Socorro	LINEAR	V	1.1 km	MPC · JPL
194327	2001 UJ_{122}	—	October 22, 2001	Socorro	LINEAR	NYS	1.6 km	MPC · JPL
194328	2001 UG_{130}	—	October 20, 2001	Socorro	LINEAR	·	1.6 km	MPC · JPL
194329	2001 UQ_{131}	—	October 20, 2001	Socorro	LINEAR	·	1.5 km	MPC · JPL
194330	2001 UN_{133}	—	October 21, 2001	Socorro	LINEAR	PHO	1.1 km	MPC · JPL
194331	2001 UZ_{133}	—	October 21, 2001	Socorro	LINEAR	·	820 m	MPC · JPL
194332	2001 UO_{134}	—	October 21, 2001	Socorro	LINEAR	MAS	900 m	MPC · JPL
194333	2001 UT_{134}	—	October 21, 2001	Socorro	LINEAR	·	1.8 km	MPC · JPL
194334	2001 UP_{136}	—	October 22, 2001	Socorro	LINEAR	·	2.0 km	MPC · JPL
194335	2001 UX_{137}	—	October 23, 2001	Socorro	LINEAR	·	1.5 km	MPC · JPL
194336	2001 UV_{139}	—	October 23, 2001	Socorro	LINEAR	·	1.5 km	MPC · JPL
194337	2001 UQ_{140}	—	October 23, 2001	Socorro	LINEAR	·	980 m	MPC · JPL
194338	2001 UZ_{145}	—	October 23, 2001	Socorro	LINEAR	·	1.2 km	MPC · JPL
194339	2001 UR_{146}	—	October 23, 2001	Socorro	LINEAR	·	1.6 km	MPC · JPL
194340	2001 UK_{149}	—	October 23, 2001	Socorro	LINEAR	V	930 m	MPC · JPL
194341	2001 UH_{151}	—	October 23, 2001	Socorro	LINEAR	NYS	1.4 km	MPC · JPL
194342	2001 UU_{151}	—	October 23, 2001	Socorro	LINEAR	·	1.8 km	MPC · JPL
194343	2001 UE_{152}	—	October 23, 2001	Socorro	LINEAR	·	1.2 km	MPC · JPL
194344	2001 UP_{152}	—	October 23, 2001	Socorro	LINEAR	·	1.8 km	MPC · JPL
194345	2001 UR_{154}	—	October 23, 2001	Socorro	LINEAR	V	1.1 km	MPC · JPL
194346	2001 US_{155}	—	October 23, 2001	Socorro	LINEAR	·	1.4 km	MPC · JPL
194347	2001 UA_{156}	—	October 23, 2001	Socorro	LINEAR	·	1.1 km	MPC · JPL
194348	2001 US_{156}	—	October 23, 2001	Socorro	LINEAR	·	1.5 km	MPC · JPL
194349	2001 UG_{157}	—	October 23, 2001	Socorro	LINEAR	·	1.3 km	MPC · JPL
194350	2001 UW_{157}	—	October 23, 2001	Socorro	LINEAR	NYS	1.2 km	MPC · JPL
194351	2001 UY_{157}	—	October 23, 2001	Socorro	LINEAR	·	1.7 km	MPC · JPL
194352	2001 UT_{159}	—	October 23, 2001	Socorro	LINEAR	·	1.3 km	MPC · JPL
194353	2001 UJ_{161}	—	October 23, 2001	Socorro	LINEAR	·	1.1 km	MPC · JPL
194354	2001 UQ_{164}	—	October 19, 2001	Palomar	NEAT	·	1.4 km	MPC · JPL
194355	2001 US_{165}	—	October 23, 2001	Palomar	NEAT	·	1.2 km	MPC · JPL
194356	2001 UW_{169}	—	October 21, 2001	Socorro	LINEAR	V	980 m	MPC · JPL
194357	2001 UL_{170}	—	October 21, 2001	Socorro	LINEAR	NYS	1.6 km	MPC · JPL
194358	2001 UM_{170}	—	October 21, 2001	Socorro	LINEAR	·	1.3 km	MPC · JPL
194359	2001 UQ_{170}	—	October 21, 2001	Socorro	LINEAR	NYS	1.8 km	MPC · JPL
194360	2001 UB_{172}	—	October 18, 2001	Palomar	NEAT	·	970 m	MPC · JPL
194361	2001 UC_{175}	—	October 24, 2001	Palomar	NEAT	NYS	1.0 km	MPC · JPL
194362	2001 UX_{175}	—	October 19, 2001	Kitt Peak	Spacewatch	·	1.5 km	MPC · JPL
194363	2001 UC_{177}	—	October 21, 2001	Socorro	LINEAR	·	1.4 km	MPC · JPL
194364	2001 UX_{177}	—	October 23, 2001	Socorro	LINEAR	NYS	1.4 km	MPC · JPL
194365	2001 UG_{178}	—	October 23, 2001	Palomar	NEAT	·	1.2 km	MPC · JPL
194366	2001 UW_{183}	—	October 16, 2001	Socorro	LINEAR	·	970 m	MPC · JPL
194367	2001 UR_{187}	—	October 17, 2001	Palomar	NEAT	·	960 m	MPC · JPL
194368	2001 UQ_{189}	—	October 18, 2001	Palomar	NEAT	·	950 m	MPC · JPL
194369	2001 UG_{195}	—	October 18, 2001	Palomar	NEAT	·	910 m	MPC · JPL
194370	2001 UF_{196}	—	October 18, 2001	Kitt Peak	Spacewatch	V	1.1 km	MPC · JPL
194371	2001 UJ_{196}	—	October 18, 2001	Kitt Peak	Spacewatch	·	1.3 km	MPC · JPL
194372	2001 UW_{201}	—	October 19, 2001	Palomar	NEAT	·	1.1 km	MPC · JPL
194373	2001 UE_{205}	—	October 19, 2001	Palomar	NEAT	·	1.8 km	MPC · JPL
194374	2001 UM_{210}	—	October 21, 2001	Socorro	LINEAR	·	1.6 km	MPC · JPL
194375	2001 UY_{211}	—	October 21, 2001	Socorro	LINEAR	(2076)	1.1 km	MPC · JPL
194376	2001 US_{212}	—	October 21, 2001	Kitt Peak	Spacewatch	·	1 km	MPC · JPL
194377	2001 UJ_{213}	—	October 23, 2001	Socorro	LINEAR	·	1.1 km	MPC · JPL
194378	2001 UE_{215}	—	October 23, 2001	Kitt Peak	Spacewatch	NYS	1.7 km	MPC · JPL
194379	2001 UH_{217}	—	October 24, 2001	Socorro	LINEAR	·	2.3 km	MPC · JPL
194380	2001 UO_{221}	—	October 23, 2001	Socorro	LINEAR	V	810 m	MPC · JPL
194381	2001 VY_{1}	—	November 8, 2001	Bisei SG Center	BATTeRS	·	2.2 km	MPC · JPL
194382	2001 VL_{2}	—	November 10, 2001	Badlands	Dyvig, R.	NYS	2.0 km	MPC · JPL
194383	2001 VE_{3}	—	November 9, 2001	Kitt Peak	Spacewatch	V	770 m	MPC · JPL
194384	2001 VK_{3}	—	November 9, 2001	Kitt Peak	Spacewatch	3:2 · SHU	7.0 km	MPC · JPL
194385	2001 VD_{4}	—	November 11, 2001	Kitt Peak	Spacewatch	·	3.1 km	MPC · JPL
194386	2001 VG_{5}	—	November 10, 2001	Socorro	LINEAR	APO +1km	920 m	MPC · JPL
194387	2001 VY_{6}	—	November 9, 2001	Socorro	LINEAR	·	1.6 km	MPC · JPL
194388	2001 VG_{7}	—	November 9, 2001	Socorro	LINEAR	V	1.0 km	MPC · JPL
194389	2001 VR_{9}	—	November 9, 2001	Socorro	LINEAR	·	2.0 km	MPC · JPL
194390	2001 VG_{10}	—	November 10, 2001	Socorro	LINEAR	·	1.5 km	MPC · JPL
194391	2001 VB_{14}	—	November 10, 2001	Socorro	LINEAR	·	1.8 km	MPC · JPL
194392	2001 VJ_{15}	—	November 10, 2001	Socorro	LINEAR	·	1.5 km	MPC · JPL
194393	2001 VD_{18}	—	November 9, 2001	Socorro	LINEAR	·	1.2 km	MPC · JPL
194394	2001 VO_{19}	—	November 9, 2001	Socorro	LINEAR	·	1.4 km	MPC · JPL
194395	2001 VW_{21}	—	November 9, 2001	Socorro	LINEAR	·	1.4 km	MPC · JPL
194396	2001 VM_{22}	—	November 9, 2001	Socorro	LINEAR	V	1.2 km	MPC · JPL
194397	2001 VO_{23}	—	November 9, 2001	Socorro	LINEAR	MAS	880 m	MPC · JPL
194398	2001 VV_{23}	—	November 9, 2001	Socorro	LINEAR	·	2.2 km	MPC · JPL
194399	2001 VF_{24}	—	November 9, 2001	Socorro	LINEAR	3:2	8.5 km	MPC · JPL
194400	2001 VO_{24}	—	November 9, 2001	Socorro	LINEAR	MAS	1.3 km	MPC · JPL

== 194401–194500 ==
back to top

Designation			Discovery			Properties		Ref
Permanent	Provisional	Named after	Date	Site	Discoverer(s)	Category	Diam.	Ref
194401	2001 VS_{24}	—	November 9, 2001	Socorro	LINEAR	·	1.7 km	MPC · JPL
194402	2001 VK_{26}	—	November 9, 2001	Socorro	LINEAR	·	2.2 km	MPC · JPL
194403	2001 VM_{27}	—	November 9, 2001	Socorro	LINEAR	NYS	1.8 km	MPC · JPL
194404	2001 VP_{30}	—	November 9, 2001	Socorro	LINEAR	·	1.8 km	MPC · JPL
194405	2001 VA_{33}	—	November 9, 2001	Socorro	LINEAR	NYS	1.6 km	MPC · JPL
194406	2001 VB_{33}	—	November 9, 2001	Socorro	LINEAR	·	1.5 km	MPC · JPL
194407	2001 VG_{33}	—	November 9, 2001	Socorro	LINEAR	·	1.5 km	MPC · JPL
194408	2001 VR_{35}	—	November 9, 2001	Socorro	LINEAR	·	1.6 km	MPC · JPL
194409	2001 VV_{35}	—	November 9, 2001	Socorro	LINEAR	·	1.9 km	MPC · JPL
194410	2001 VA_{38}	—	November 9, 2001	Socorro	LINEAR	·	920 m	MPC · JPL
194411	2001 VG_{40}	—	November 9, 2001	Socorro	LINEAR	·	1.9 km	MPC · JPL
194412	2001 VJ_{46}	—	November 9, 2001	Socorro	LINEAR	PHO	3.5 km	MPC · JPL
194413	2001 VS_{46}	—	November 9, 2001	Socorro	LINEAR	·	1.7 km	MPC · JPL
194414	2001 VZ_{50}	—	November 10, 2001	Socorro	LINEAR	·	3.7 km	MPC · JPL
194415	2001 VN_{53}	—	November 10, 2001	Socorro	LINEAR	·	1.6 km	MPC · JPL
194416	2001 VO_{56}	—	November 10, 2001	Socorro	LINEAR	·	1.7 km	MPC · JPL
194417	2001 VW_{56}	—	November 10, 2001	Socorro	LINEAR	·	1.1 km	MPC · JPL
194418	2001 VG_{57}	—	November 10, 2001	Socorro	LINEAR	NYS	1.4 km	MPC · JPL
194419	2001 VH_{59}	—	November 10, 2001	Socorro	LINEAR	·	2.0 km	MPC · JPL
194420	2001 VY_{59}	—	November 10, 2001	Socorro	LINEAR	·	1.5 km	MPC · JPL
194421	2001 VM_{61}	—	November 10, 2001	Socorro	LINEAR	·	2.6 km	MPC · JPL
194422	2001 VR_{61}	—	November 10, 2001	Socorro	LINEAR	·	1.4 km	MPC · JPL
194423	2001 VC_{62}	—	November 10, 2001	Socorro	LINEAR	·	1.2 km	MPC · JPL
194424	2001 VV_{62}	—	November 10, 2001	Socorro	LINEAR	PHO	1.3 km	MPC · JPL
194425	2001 VK_{65}	—	November 10, 2001	Socorro	LINEAR	·	2.0 km	MPC · JPL
194426	2001 VF_{66}	—	November 10, 2001	Socorro	LINEAR	NYS	1.7 km	MPC · JPL
194427	2001 VZ_{68}	—	November 11, 2001	Socorro	LINEAR	·	930 m	MPC · JPL
194428	2001 VY_{70}	—	November 11, 2001	Socorro	LINEAR	·	1.9 km	MPC · JPL
194429	2001 VR_{71}	—	November 10, 2001	Ondřejov	P. Pravec, P. Kušnirák	·	1.5 km	MPC · JPL
194430	2001 VO_{77}	—	November 12, 2001	Haleakala	NEAT	·	1.2 km	MPC · JPL
194431	2001 VP_{80}	—	November 10, 2001	Palomar	NEAT	·	1.9 km	MPC · JPL
194432	2001 VJ_{82}	—	November 10, 2001	Socorro	LINEAR	·	1.8 km	MPC · JPL
194433	2001 VY_{82}	—	November 10, 2001	Socorro	LINEAR	·	1.1 km	MPC · JPL
194434	2001 VH_{83}	—	November 10, 2001	Socorro	LINEAR	NYS	1.3 km	MPC · JPL
194435	2001 VF_{86}	—	November 12, 2001	Socorro	LINEAR	·	2.0 km	MPC · JPL
194436	2001 VQ_{87}	—	November 15, 2001	Palomar	NEAT	ERI	2.7 km	MPC · JPL
194437	2001 VP_{88}	—	November 15, 2001	Palomar	NEAT	NYS	1.2 km	MPC · JPL
194438	2001 VF_{100}	—	November 12, 2001	Socorro	LINEAR	NYS	2.4 km	MPC · JPL
194439	2001 VD_{106}	—	November 12, 2001	Socorro	LINEAR	·	1.7 km	MPC · JPL
194440	2001 VU_{107}	—	November 12, 2001	Socorro	LINEAR	·	1.8 km	MPC · JPL
194441	2001 VV_{108}	—	November 12, 2001	Socorro	LINEAR	NYS	1.2 km	MPC · JPL
194442	2001 VB_{110}	—	November 12, 2001	Socorro	LINEAR	MAS	820 m	MPC · JPL
194443	2001 VN_{110}	—	November 12, 2001	Socorro	LINEAR	·	1.5 km	MPC · JPL
194444	2001 VV_{111}	—	November 12, 2001	Socorro	LINEAR	·	1.7 km	MPC · JPL
194445	2001 VX_{111}	—	November 12, 2001	Socorro	LINEAR	·	1.5 km	MPC · JPL
194446	2001 VX_{112}	—	November 12, 2001	Socorro	LINEAR	NYS	1.1 km	MPC · JPL
194447	2001 VP_{113}	—	November 12, 2001	Socorro	LINEAR	MAS	1.2 km	MPC · JPL
194448	2001 VA_{114}	—	November 12, 2001	Socorro	LINEAR	·	2.1 km	MPC · JPL
194449	2001 VP_{115}	—	November 12, 2001	Socorro	LINEAR	NYS	1.2 km	MPC · JPL
194450	2001 VF_{116}	—	November 12, 2001	Socorro	LINEAR	·	1.7 km	MPC · JPL
194451	2001 VC_{117}	—	November 12, 2001	Socorro	LINEAR	NYS	2.2 km	MPC · JPL
194452	2001 VG_{117}	—	November 12, 2001	Socorro	LINEAR	NYS	1.5 km	MPC · JPL
194453	2001 VK_{117}	—	November 12, 2001	Socorro	LINEAR	·	2.0 km	MPC · JPL
194454	2001 VW_{117}	—	November 12, 2001	Socorro	LINEAR	·	2.2 km	MPC · JPL
194455	2001 VO_{120}	—	November 12, 2001	Socorro	LINEAR	·	1.9 km	MPC · JPL
194456	2001 VT_{120}	—	November 12, 2001	Socorro	LINEAR	·	1.6 km	MPC · JPL
194457	2001 VX_{123}	—	November 9, 2001	Palomar	NEAT	·	1.4 km	MPC · JPL
194458	2001 VX_{124}	—	November 11, 2001	Socorro	LINEAR	V	990 m	MPC · JPL
194459	2001 WE_{2}	—	November 20, 2001	Anderson Mesa	LONEOS	·	1.9 km	MPC · JPL
194460	2001 WO_{2}	—	November 17, 2001	Socorro	LINEAR	·	1.4 km	MPC · JPL
194461	2001 WF_{3}	—	November 16, 2001	Kitt Peak	Spacewatch	·	1.4 km	MPC · JPL
194462	2001 WZ_{3}	—	November 17, 2001	Kitt Peak	Spacewatch	MAS	730 m	MPC · JPL
194463	2001 WL_{7}	—	November 17, 2001	Socorro	LINEAR	·	2.1 km	MPC · JPL
194464	2001 WU_{9}	—	November 17, 2001	Socorro	LINEAR	·	2.1 km	MPC · JPL
194465	2001 WJ_{11}	—	November 17, 2001	Socorro	LINEAR	·	1.2 km	MPC · JPL
194466	2001 WO_{11}	—	November 17, 2001	Socorro	LINEAR	·	1.6 km	MPC · JPL
194467	2001 WU_{11}	—	November 17, 2001	Socorro	LINEAR	·	2.2 km	MPC · JPL
194468	2001 WY_{11}	—	November 17, 2001	Socorro	LINEAR	·	1.2 km	MPC · JPL
194469	2001 WB_{14}	—	November 17, 2001	Socorro	LINEAR	·	2.8 km	MPC · JPL
194470	2001 WF_{15}	—	November 17, 2001	Anderson Mesa	LONEOS	PHO	1.5 km	MPC · JPL
194471	2001 WF_{19}	—	November 17, 2001	Socorro	LINEAR	·	1.2 km	MPC · JPL
194472	2001 WJ_{19}	—	November 17, 2001	Socorro	LINEAR	NYS	1.2 km	MPC · JPL
194473	2001 WQ_{21}	—	November 18, 2001	Socorro	LINEAR	·	1.1 km	MPC · JPL
194474	2001 WT_{25}	—	November 17, 2001	Socorro	LINEAR	·	1.7 km	MPC · JPL
194475	2001 WF_{27}	—	November 17, 2001	Socorro	LINEAR	·	1.6 km	MPC · JPL
194476	2001 WT_{27}	—	November 17, 2001	Socorro	LINEAR	·	1.7 km	MPC · JPL
194477	2001 WP_{33}	—	November 17, 2001	Socorro	LINEAR	·	1.5 km	MPC · JPL
194478	2001 WW_{34}	—	November 17, 2001	Socorro	LINEAR	·	1.4 km	MPC · JPL
194479	2001 WE_{35}	—	November 17, 2001	Socorro	LINEAR	·	1.6 km	MPC · JPL
194480	2001 WY_{36}	—	November 17, 2001	Socorro	LINEAR	·	1.7 km	MPC · JPL
194481	2001 WA_{37}	—	November 17, 2001	Socorro	LINEAR	·	1.1 km	MPC · JPL
194482	2001 WG_{39}	—	November 17, 2001	Socorro	LINEAR	·	2.0 km	MPC · JPL
194483	2001 WR_{45}	—	November 19, 2001	Socorro	LINEAR	·	1.4 km	MPC · JPL
194484	2001 WT_{46}	—	November 19, 2001	Socorro	LINEAR	·	1.3 km	MPC · JPL
194485	2001 WW_{46}	—	November 19, 2001	Socorro	LINEAR	V	950 m	MPC · JPL
194486	2001 WN_{47}	—	November 17, 2001	Anderson Mesa	LONEOS	·	2.5 km	MPC · JPL
194487	2001 WM_{53}	—	November 19, 2001	Socorro	LINEAR	V	1.7 km	MPC · JPL
194488	2001 WC_{55}	—	November 19, 2001	Socorro	LINEAR	·	2.2 km	MPC · JPL
194489	2001 WS_{55}	—	November 19, 2001	Socorro	LINEAR	·	1.3 km	MPC · JPL
194490	2001 WJ_{59}	—	November 19, 2001	Socorro	LINEAR	·	2.4 km	MPC · JPL
194491	2001 WQ_{60}	—	November 19, 2001	Socorro	LINEAR	·	1.3 km	MPC · JPL
194492	2001 WV_{63}	—	November 19, 2001	Socorro	LINEAR	·	1.2 km	MPC · JPL
194493	2001 WY_{64}	—	November 20, 2001	Socorro	LINEAR	·	990 m	MPC · JPL
194494	2001 WN_{72}	—	November 20, 2001	Socorro	LINEAR	NYS	870 m	MPC · JPL
194495	2001 WS_{73}	—	November 20, 2001	Socorro	LINEAR	MAS	1.1 km	MPC · JPL
194496	2001 WY_{77}	—	November 20, 2001	Socorro	LINEAR	·	980 m	MPC · JPL
194497	2001 WT_{80}	—	November 20, 2001	Socorro	LINEAR	·	1.5 km	MPC · JPL
194498	2001 WO_{81}	—	November 20, 2001	Socorro	LINEAR	MAS	1.5 km	MPC · JPL
194499	2001 WX_{81}	—	November 20, 2001	Socorro	LINEAR	MAS	950 m	MPC · JPL
194500	2001 WF_{82}	—	November 20, 2001	Socorro	LINEAR	·	1.9 km	MPC · JPL

== 194501–194600 ==
back to top

Designation			Discovery			Properties		Ref
Permanent	Provisional	Named after	Date	Site	Discoverer(s)	Category	Diam.	Ref
194501	2001 WJ_{85}	—	November 20, 2001	Socorro	LINEAR	3:2	5.0 km	MPC · JPL
194502	2001 WE_{87}	—	November 19, 2001	Socorro	LINEAR	·	1.6 km	MPC · JPL
194503	2001 WM_{87}	—	November 19, 2001	Socorro	LINEAR	NYS	1.5 km	MPC · JPL
194504	2001 WX_{87}	—	November 19, 2001	Socorro	LINEAR	·	1.4 km	MPC · JPL
194505	2001 WO_{88}	—	November 19, 2001	Socorro	LINEAR	·	1.0 km	MPC · JPL
194506	2001 WD_{90}	—	November 21, 2001	Socorro	LINEAR	V	900 m	MPC · JPL
194507	2001 WR_{92}	—	November 21, 2001	Socorro	LINEAR	·	1.5 km	MPC · JPL
194508	2001 WF_{99}	—	November 17, 2001	Socorro	LINEAR	·	1.2 km	MPC · JPL
194509	2001 WZ_{99}	—	November 21, 2001	Socorro	LINEAR	MAS	900 m	MPC · JPL
194510	2001 WV_{100}	—	November 16, 2001	Kitt Peak	Spacewatch	·	880 m	MPC · JPL
194511	2001 WY_{101}	—	November 18, 2001	Kitt Peak	Spacewatch	·	1.3 km	MPC · JPL
194512	2001 XR	—	December 7, 2001	Eskridge	G. Hug	3:2	7.2 km	MPC · JPL
194513	2001 XR_{2}	—	December 8, 2001	Socorro	LINEAR	·	2.7 km	MPC · JPL
194514	2001 XS_{6}	—	December 9, 2001	Kitt Peak	Spacewatch	NYS	1.2 km	MPC · JPL
194515	2001 XV_{6}	—	December 9, 2001	Socorro	LINEAR	·	3.0 km	MPC · JPL
194516	2001 XD_{8}	—	December 8, 2001	Socorro	LINEAR	MAS	890 m	MPC · JPL
194517	2001 XZ_{8}	—	December 9, 2001	Socorro	LINEAR	·	2.1 km	MPC · JPL
194518	2001 XC_{9}	—	December 9, 2001	Socorro	LINEAR	·	1.8 km	MPC · JPL
194519	2001 XD_{11}	—	December 7, 2001	Socorro	LINEAR	·	2.1 km	MPC · JPL
194520	2001 XL_{12}	—	December 9, 2001	Socorro	LINEAR	V	1.1 km	MPC · JPL
194521	2001 XA_{13}	—	December 9, 2001	Socorro	LINEAR	·	2.1 km	MPC · JPL
194522	2001 XF_{14}	—	December 9, 2001	Socorro	LINEAR	·	2.0 km	MPC · JPL
194523	2001 XC_{17}	—	December 9, 2001	Socorro	LINEAR	·	2.4 km	MPC · JPL
194524	2001 XO_{17}	—	December 9, 2001	Socorro	LINEAR	·	2.2 km	MPC · JPL
194525	2001 XV_{17}	—	December 9, 2001	Socorro	LINEAR	·	1.6 km	MPC · JPL
194526	2001 XJ_{20}	—	December 9, 2001	Socorro	LINEAR	·	1.9 km	MPC · JPL
194527	2001 XX_{20}	—	December 9, 2001	Socorro	LINEAR	V	1.6 km	MPC · JPL
194528	2001 XR_{25}	—	December 10, 2001	Socorro	LINEAR	·	1.7 km	MPC · JPL
194529	2001 XV_{32}	—	December 10, 2001	Kitt Peak	Spacewatch	V	920 m	MPC · JPL
194530	2001 XQ_{34}	—	December 9, 2001	Socorro	LINEAR	·	2.7 km	MPC · JPL
194531	2001 XD_{37}	—	December 9, 2001	Socorro	LINEAR	·	2.0 km	MPC · JPL
194532	2001 XD_{40}	—	December 9, 2001	Socorro	LINEAR	·	1.7 km	MPC · JPL
194533	2001 XP_{40}	—	December 9, 2001	Socorro	LINEAR	·	2.0 km	MPC · JPL
194534	2001 XT_{41}	—	December 9, 2001	Socorro	LINEAR	·	2.2 km	MPC · JPL
194535	2001 XN_{45}	—	December 9, 2001	Socorro	LINEAR	·	1.8 km	MPC · JPL
194536	2001 XO_{47}	—	December 9, 2001	Socorro	LINEAR	·	3.0 km	MPC · JPL
194537	2001 XB_{49}	—	December 10, 2001	Socorro	LINEAR	MAS	1.2 km	MPC · JPL
194538	2001 XC_{49}	—	December 10, 2001	Socorro	LINEAR	NYS	3.0 km	MPC · JPL
194539	2001 XP_{49}	—	December 10, 2001	Socorro	LINEAR	·	1.5 km	MPC · JPL
194540	2001 XP_{51}	—	December 10, 2001	Socorro	LINEAR	·	1.5 km	MPC · JPL
194541	2001 XU_{52}	—	December 11, 2001	Socorro	LINEAR	·	2.9 km	MPC · JPL
194542	2001 XZ_{60}	—	December 10, 2001	Socorro	LINEAR	V	1.0 km	MPC · JPL
194543	2001 XW_{63}	—	December 10, 2001	Socorro	LINEAR	·	1.6 km	MPC · JPL
194544	2001 XO_{65}	—	December 10, 2001	Socorro	LINEAR	NYS	1.9 km	MPC · JPL
194545	2001 XN_{66}	—	December 10, 2001	Socorro	LINEAR	·	2.0 km	MPC · JPL
194546	2001 XH_{67}	—	December 10, 2001	Socorro	LINEAR	·	1.5 km	MPC · JPL
194547	2001 XT_{67}	—	December 10, 2001	Socorro	LINEAR	MAS	1.3 km	MPC · JPL
194548	2001 XC_{72}	—	December 11, 2001	Socorro	LINEAR	·	2.0 km	MPC · JPL
194549	2001 XE_{72}	—	December 11, 2001	Socorro	LINEAR	·	2.7 km	MPC · JPL
194550	2001 XW_{73}	—	December 11, 2001	Socorro	LINEAR	·	1.7 km	MPC · JPL
194551	2001 XM_{74}	—	December 11, 2001	Socorro	LINEAR	·	1.3 km	MPC · JPL
194552	2001 XU_{74}	—	December 11, 2001	Socorro	LINEAR	NYS	1.3 km	MPC · JPL
194553	2001 XK_{76}	—	December 11, 2001	Socorro	LINEAR	·	1.6 km	MPC · JPL
194554	2001 XZ_{76}	—	December 11, 2001	Socorro	LINEAR	·	1.5 km	MPC · JPL
194555	2001 XE_{77}	—	December 11, 2001	Socorro	LINEAR	MAS	960 m	MPC · JPL
194556	2001 XF_{79}	—	December 11, 2001	Socorro	LINEAR	·	1.4 km	MPC · JPL
194557	2001 XR_{79}	—	December 11, 2001	Socorro	LINEAR	NYS	1.3 km	MPC · JPL
194558	2001 XZ_{80}	—	December 11, 2001	Socorro	LINEAR	NYS	2.0 km	MPC · JPL
194559	2001 XY_{82}	—	December 11, 2001	Socorro	LINEAR	·	1.5 km	MPC · JPL
194560	2001 XK_{84}	—	December 11, 2001	Socorro	LINEAR	·	1.8 km	MPC · JPL
194561	2001 XF_{88}	—	December 14, 2001	Desert Eagle	W. K. Y. Yeung	ERI	2.5 km	MPC · JPL
194562	2001 XS_{89}	—	December 10, 2001	Socorro	LINEAR	MAS	1.2 km	MPC · JPL
194563	2001 XU_{89}	—	December 10, 2001	Socorro	LINEAR	·	1.4 km	MPC · JPL
194564	2001 XY_{89}	—	December 10, 2001	Socorro	LINEAR	MAS	660 m	MPC · JPL
194565	2001 XC_{91}	—	December 10, 2001	Socorro	LINEAR	NYS	1.2 km	MPC · JPL
194566	2001 XH_{91}	—	December 10, 2001	Socorro	LINEAR	NYS	1.8 km	MPC · JPL
194567	2001 XR_{91}	—	December 10, 2001	Socorro	LINEAR	MAS	1 km	MPC · JPL
194568	2001 XT_{91}	—	December 10, 2001	Socorro	LINEAR	·	1.5 km	MPC · JPL
194569	2001 XQ_{92}	—	December 10, 2001	Socorro	LINEAR	NYS	1.4 km	MPC · JPL
194570	2001 XS_{92}	—	December 10, 2001	Socorro	LINEAR	·	1.2 km	MPC · JPL
194571	2001 XL_{93}	—	December 10, 2001	Socorro	LINEAR	NYS	2.0 km	MPC · JPL
194572	2001 XR_{94}	—	December 10, 2001	Socorro	LINEAR	V	1.1 km	MPC · JPL
194573	2001 XY_{94}	—	December 10, 2001	Socorro	LINEAR	·	1.8 km	MPC · JPL
194574	2001 XB_{95}	—	December 10, 2001	Socorro	LINEAR	NYS	1.3 km	MPC · JPL
194575	2001 XR_{95}	—	December 10, 2001	Socorro	LINEAR	MAS	1.1 km	MPC · JPL
194576	2001 XP_{97}	—	December 10, 2001	Socorro	LINEAR	·	1.6 km	MPC · JPL
194577	2001 XP_{98}	—	December 10, 2001	Socorro	LINEAR	NYS ·	3.1 km	MPC · JPL
194578	2001 XQ_{98}	—	December 10, 2001	Socorro	LINEAR	·	1.4 km	MPC · JPL
194579	2001 XX_{101}	—	December 10, 2001	Socorro	LINEAR	·	1.8 km	MPC · JPL
194580	2001 XY_{102}	—	December 14, 2001	Socorro	LINEAR	·	1.9 km	MPC · JPL
194581	2001 XK_{104}	—	December 15, 2001	Socorro	LINEAR	PHO	6.2 km	MPC · JPL
194582	2001 XG_{106}	—	December 10, 2001	Socorro	LINEAR	CLA	2.0 km	MPC · JPL
194583	2001 XK_{107}	—	December 10, 2001	Socorro	LINEAR	NYS ·	2.9 km	MPC · JPL
194584	2001 XU_{107}	—	December 10, 2001	Socorro	LINEAR	·	1.8 km	MPC · JPL
194585	2001 XS_{108}	—	December 10, 2001	Socorro	LINEAR	·	2.0 km	MPC · JPL
194586	2001 XK_{110}	—	December 11, 2001	Socorro	LINEAR	·	1.1 km	MPC · JPL
194587	2001 XD_{111}	—	December 11, 2001	Socorro	LINEAR	·	2.0 km	MPC · JPL
194588	2001 XH_{111}	—	December 11, 2001	Socorro	LINEAR	V	1 km	MPC · JPL
194589	2001 XV_{114}	—	December 13, 2001	Socorro	LINEAR	·	1.9 km	MPC · JPL
194590	2001 XA_{117}	—	December 13, 2001	Socorro	LINEAR	·	2.4 km	MPC · JPL
194591	2001 XE_{117}	—	December 13, 2001	Socorro	LINEAR	·	1.8 km	MPC · JPL
194592	2001 XH_{117}	—	December 13, 2001	Socorro	LINEAR	·	2.0 km	MPC · JPL
194593	2001 XL_{118}	—	December 13, 2001	Socorro	LINEAR	·	2.3 km	MPC · JPL
194594	2001 XW_{118}	—	December 13, 2001	Socorro	LINEAR	·	2.6 km	MPC · JPL
194595	2001 XB_{119}	—	December 13, 2001	Socorro	LINEAR	·	2.3 km	MPC · JPL
194596	2001 XG_{120}	—	December 14, 2001	Socorro	LINEAR	·	2.8 km	MPC · JPL
194597	2001 XL_{121}	—	December 14, 2001	Socorro	LINEAR	·	1.5 km	MPC · JPL
194598	2001 XQ_{124}	—	December 14, 2001	Socorro	LINEAR	·	1.7 km	MPC · JPL
194599	2001 XT_{124}	—	December 14, 2001	Socorro	LINEAR	MAS	1.0 km	MPC · JPL
194600	2001 XW_{127}	—	December 14, 2001	Socorro	LINEAR	MAS	1.1 km	MPC · JPL

== 194601–194700 ==
back to top

Designation			Discovery			Properties		Ref
Permanent	Provisional	Named after	Date	Site	Discoverer(s)	Category	Diam.	Ref
194601	2001 XC_{129}	—	December 14, 2001	Socorro	LINEAR	NYS	1.3 km	MPC · JPL
194602	2001 XR_{129}	—	December 14, 2001	Socorro	LINEAR	·	1.7 km	MPC · JPL
194603	2001 XX_{129}	—	December 14, 2001	Socorro	LINEAR	·	1.2 km	MPC · JPL
194604	2001 XW_{130}	—	December 14, 2001	Socorro	LINEAR	·	1.8 km	MPC · JPL
194605	2001 XX_{130}	—	December 14, 2001	Socorro	LINEAR	V	920 m	MPC · JPL
194606	2001 XG_{131}	—	December 14, 2001	Socorro	LINEAR	·	2.2 km	MPC · JPL
194607	2001 XZ_{131}	—	December 14, 2001	Socorro	LINEAR	MAS	1.1 km	MPC · JPL
194608	2001 XF_{133}	—	December 14, 2001	Socorro	LINEAR	·	1.3 km	MPC · JPL
194609	2001 XX_{133}	—	December 14, 2001	Socorro	LINEAR	MAS	940 m	MPC · JPL
194610	2001 XG_{135}	—	December 14, 2001	Socorro	LINEAR	NYS	1.4 km	MPC · JPL
194611	2001 XW_{135}	—	December 14, 2001	Socorro	LINEAR	·	1.3 km	MPC · JPL
194612	2001 XF_{136}	—	December 14, 2001	Socorro	LINEAR	·	990 m	MPC · JPL
194613	2001 XE_{139}	—	December 14, 2001	Socorro	LINEAR	MAS	920 m	MPC · JPL
194614	2001 XD_{140}	—	December 14, 2001	Socorro	LINEAR	·	1.2 km	MPC · JPL
194615	2001 XB_{143}	—	December 14, 2001	Socorro	LINEAR	MAS	1.2 km	MPC · JPL
194616	2001 XN_{147}	—	December 14, 2001	Socorro	LINEAR	NYS	1.5 km	MPC · JPL
194617	2001 XU_{147}	—	December 14, 2001	Socorro	LINEAR	NYS	1.2 km	MPC · JPL
194618	2001 XV_{147}	—	December 14, 2001	Socorro	LINEAR	·	1.6 km	MPC · JPL
194619	2001 XQ_{149}	—	December 14, 2001	Socorro	LINEAR	MAS	1.3 km	MPC · JPL
194620	2001 XW_{149}	—	December 14, 2001	Socorro	LINEAR	·	1.8 km	MPC · JPL
194621	2001 XP_{150}	—	December 14, 2001	Socorro	LINEAR	·	1.6 km	MPC · JPL
194622	2001 XE_{151}	—	December 14, 2001	Socorro	LINEAR	·	1.8 km	MPC · JPL
194623	2001 XG_{151}	—	December 14, 2001	Socorro	LINEAR	·	1.5 km	MPC · JPL
194624	2001 XV_{152}	—	December 14, 2001	Socorro	LINEAR	NYS	1.1 km	MPC · JPL
194625	2001 XM_{154}	—	December 14, 2001	Socorro	LINEAR	ERI	4.1 km	MPC · JPL
194626	2001 XR_{154}	—	December 14, 2001	Socorro	LINEAR	MAS	900 m	MPC · JPL
194627	2001 XV_{156}	—	December 14, 2001	Socorro	LINEAR	NYS	1.5 km	MPC · JPL
194628	2001 XJ_{157}	—	December 14, 2001	Socorro	LINEAR	·	1.8 km	MPC · JPL
194629	2001 XD_{158}	—	December 14, 2001	Socorro	LINEAR	NYS	2.0 km	MPC · JPL
194630	2001 XA_{159}	—	December 14, 2001	Socorro	LINEAR	NYS ·	2.3 km	MPC · JPL
194631	2001 XE_{162}	—	December 14, 2001	Socorro	LINEAR	3:2	6.0 km	MPC · JPL
194632	2001 XJ_{162}	—	December 14, 2001	Socorro	LINEAR	NYS	1.5 km	MPC · JPL
194633	2001 XF_{163}	—	December 14, 2001	Socorro	LINEAR	MAS	1.1 km	MPC · JPL
194634	2001 XW_{163}	—	December 14, 2001	Socorro	LINEAR	MAS	980 m	MPC · JPL
194635	2001 XG_{164}	—	December 14, 2001	Socorro	LINEAR	·	1.1 km	MPC · JPL
194636	2001 XJ_{165}	—	December 14, 2001	Socorro	LINEAR	NYS	1.5 km	MPC · JPL
194637	2001 XR_{165}	—	December 14, 2001	Socorro	LINEAR	NYS	1.4 km	MPC · JPL
194638	2001 XO_{166}	—	December 14, 2001	Socorro	LINEAR	NYS ·	1.9 km	MPC · JPL
194639	2001 XX_{166}	—	December 14, 2001	Socorro	LINEAR	NYS	1.2 km	MPC · JPL
194640	2001 XP_{168}	—	December 14, 2001	Socorro	LINEAR	·	1.9 km	MPC · JPL
194641	2001 XS_{169}	—	December 14, 2001	Socorro	LINEAR	NYS	1.7 km	MPC · JPL
194642	2001 XH_{170}	—	December 14, 2001	Socorro	LINEAR	·	1.0 km	MPC · JPL
194643	2001 XO_{172}	—	December 14, 2001	Socorro	LINEAR	·	1.6 km	MPC · JPL
194644	2001 XS_{172}	—	December 14, 2001	Socorro	LINEAR	CLA	3.2 km	MPC · JPL
194645	2001 XX_{172}	—	December 14, 2001	Socorro	LINEAR	·	2.1 km	MPC · JPL
194646	2001 XE_{173}	—	December 14, 2001	Socorro	LINEAR	MAS	1.0 km	MPC · JPL
194647	2001 XV_{173}	—	December 14, 2001	Socorro	LINEAR	V	1.2 km	MPC · JPL
194648	2001 XQ_{175}	—	December 14, 2001	Socorro	LINEAR	NYS	1.6 km	MPC · JPL
194649	2001 XS_{175}	—	December 14, 2001	Socorro	LINEAR	NYS	1.3 km	MPC · JPL
194650	2001 XB_{176}	—	December 14, 2001	Socorro	LINEAR	NYS	1.6 km	MPC · JPL
194651	2001 XE_{177}	—	December 14, 2001	Socorro	LINEAR	·	1.5 km	MPC · JPL
194652	2001 XL_{177}	—	December 14, 2001	Socorro	LINEAR	·	1.8 km	MPC · JPL
194653	2001 XS_{177}	—	December 14, 2001	Socorro	LINEAR	·	1.7 km	MPC · JPL
194654	2001 XY_{177}	—	December 14, 2001	Socorro	LINEAR	·	3.2 km	MPC · JPL
194655	2001 XG_{180}	—	December 14, 2001	Socorro	LINEAR	·	2.3 km	MPC · JPL
194656	2001 XK_{180}	—	December 14, 2001	Socorro	LINEAR	·	2.2 km	MPC · JPL
194657	2001 XQ_{180}	—	December 14, 2001	Socorro	LINEAR	·	1.6 km	MPC · JPL
194658	2001 XR_{180}	—	December 14, 2001	Socorro	LINEAR	·	1.9 km	MPC · JPL
194659	2001 XX_{180}	—	December 14, 2001	Socorro	LINEAR	·	1.7 km	MPC · JPL
194660	2001 XA_{181}	—	December 14, 2001	Socorro	LINEAR	·	2.1 km	MPC · JPL
194661	2001 XH_{181}	—	December 14, 2001	Socorro	LINEAR	MAS	1.2 km	MPC · JPL
194662	2001 XL_{183}	—	December 14, 2001	Socorro	LINEAR	·	1.7 km	MPC · JPL
194663	2001 XP_{184}	—	December 14, 2001	Socorro	LINEAR	·	1.8 km	MPC · JPL
194664	2001 XV_{185}	—	December 14, 2001	Socorro	LINEAR	·	3.0 km	MPC · JPL
194665	2001 XN_{186}	—	December 14, 2001	Socorro	LINEAR	MAS	960 m	MPC · JPL
194666	2001 XL_{187}	—	December 14, 2001	Socorro	LINEAR	·	1.9 km	MPC · JPL
194667	2001 XB_{190}	—	December 14, 2001	Socorro	LINEAR	·	1.8 km	MPC · JPL
194668	2001 XL_{190}	—	December 14, 2001	Socorro	LINEAR	·	2.0 km	MPC · JPL
194669	2001 XW_{192}	—	December 14, 2001	Socorro	LINEAR	·	2.2 km	MPC · JPL
194670	2001 XN_{193}	—	December 14, 2001	Socorro	LINEAR	·	1.8 km	MPC · JPL
194671	2001 XT_{193}	—	December 14, 2001	Socorro	LINEAR	NYS	1.7 km	MPC · JPL
194672	2001 XA_{194}	—	December 14, 2001	Socorro	LINEAR	·	2.9 km	MPC · JPL
194673	2001 XQ_{195}	—	December 14, 2001	Socorro	LINEAR	·	1.5 km	MPC · JPL
194674	2001 XR_{195}	—	December 14, 2001	Socorro	LINEAR	·	1.5 km	MPC · JPL
194675	2001 XP_{197}	—	December 14, 2001	Socorro	LINEAR	·	2.1 km	MPC · JPL
194676	2001 XY_{197}	—	December 14, 2001	Socorro	LINEAR	·	1.8 km	MPC · JPL
194677	2001 XP_{198}	—	December 14, 2001	Socorro	LINEAR	·	1.9 km	MPC · JPL
194678	2001 XK_{199}	—	December 14, 2001	Socorro	LINEAR	·	1.3 km	MPC · JPL
194679	2001 XA_{202}	—	December 14, 2001	Kitt Peak	Spacewatch	(2076)	1.4 km	MPC · JPL
194680	2001 XJ_{204}	—	December 11, 2001	Socorro	LINEAR	·	1.5 km	MPC · JPL
194681	2001 XX_{204}	—	December 11, 2001	Socorro	LINEAR	·	1.7 km	MPC · JPL
194682	2001 XG_{214}	—	December 11, 2001	Socorro	LINEAR	·	1.9 km	MPC · JPL
194683	2001 XA_{215}	—	December 13, 2001	Socorro	LINEAR	·	3.3 km	MPC · JPL
194684	2001 XR_{215}	—	December 14, 2001	Socorro	LINEAR	NYS	1.5 km	MPC · JPL
194685	2001 XQ_{217}	—	December 14, 2001	Socorro	LINEAR	·	1.4 km	MPC · JPL
194686	2001 XT_{220}	—	December 15, 2001	Socorro	LINEAR	V	910 m	MPC · JPL
194687	2001 XZ_{220}	—	December 15, 2001	Socorro	LINEAR	·	1.1 km	MPC · JPL
194688	2001 XK_{221}	—	December 15, 2001	Socorro	LINEAR	PHO	1.8 km	MPC · JPL
194689	2001 XE_{224}	—	December 15, 2001	Socorro	LINEAR	·	1.5 km	MPC · JPL
194690	2001 XY_{224}	—	December 15, 2001	Socorro	LINEAR	·	2.5 km	MPC · JPL
194691	2001 XU_{225}	—	December 15, 2001	Socorro	LINEAR	·	1.5 km	MPC · JPL
194692	2001 XS_{226}	—	December 15, 2001	Socorro	LINEAR	·	1.5 km	MPC · JPL
194693	2001 XB_{227}	—	December 15, 2001	Socorro	LINEAR	V	1.1 km	MPC · JPL
194694	2001 XF_{227}	—	December 15, 2001	Socorro	LINEAR	·	1.1 km	MPC · JPL
194695	2001 XW_{227}	—	December 15, 2001	Socorro	LINEAR	·	1.5 km	MPC · JPL
194696	2001 XG_{228}	—	December 15, 2001	Socorro	LINEAR	·	1.4 km	MPC · JPL
194697	2001 XO_{229}	—	December 15, 2001	Socorro	LINEAR	·	2.1 km	MPC · JPL
194698	2001 XD_{231}	—	December 15, 2001	Socorro	LINEAR	·	1.9 km	MPC · JPL
194699	2001 XZ_{231}	—	December 15, 2001	Socorro	LINEAR	MAS	860 m	MPC · JPL
194700	2001 XL_{232}	—	December 15, 2001	Socorro	LINEAR	NYS	1.5 km	MPC · JPL

== 194701–194800 ==
back to top

Designation			Discovery			Properties		Ref
Permanent	Provisional	Named after	Date	Site	Discoverer(s)	Category	Diam.	Ref
194701	2001 XT_{232}	—	December 15, 2001	Socorro	LINEAR	NYS	1.3 km	MPC · JPL
194702	2001 XN_{235}	—	December 15, 2001	Socorro	LINEAR	·	1.9 km	MPC · JPL
194703	2001 XS_{235}	—	December 15, 2001	Socorro	LINEAR	·	2.4 km	MPC · JPL
194704	2001 XX_{235}	—	December 15, 2001	Socorro	LINEAR	MAS	1.0 km	MPC · JPL
194705	2001 XO_{236}	—	December 15, 2001	Socorro	LINEAR	NYS	1.2 km	MPC · JPL
194706	2001 XP_{236}	—	December 15, 2001	Socorro	LINEAR	·	1.9 km	MPC · JPL
194707	2001 XK_{237}	—	December 15, 2001	Socorro	LINEAR	·	1.8 km	MPC · JPL
194708	2001 XL_{238}	—	December 15, 2001	Socorro	LINEAR	MAS	1.5 km	MPC · JPL
194709	2001 XB_{239}	—	December 15, 2001	Socorro	LINEAR	·	1.4 km	MPC · JPL
194710	2001 XB_{240}	—	December 15, 2001	Socorro	LINEAR	NYS	2.0 km	MPC · JPL
194711	2001 XE_{240}	—	December 15, 2001	Socorro	LINEAR	NYS	1.9 km	MPC · JPL
194712	2001 XQ_{240}	—	December 15, 2001	Socorro	LINEAR	·	2.3 km	MPC · JPL
194713	2001 XG_{244}	—	December 15, 2001	Socorro	LINEAR	NYS	1.6 km	MPC · JPL
194714	2001 XK_{246}	—	December 15, 2001	Socorro	LINEAR	MAS	1.0 km	MPC · JPL
194715	2001 XY_{246}	—	December 15, 2001	Socorro	LINEAR	·	1.7 km	MPC · JPL
194716	2001 XD_{247}	—	December 15, 2001	Socorro	LINEAR	·	1.2 km	MPC · JPL
194717	2001 XE_{247}	—	December 15, 2001	Socorro	LINEAR	·	1.7 km	MPC · JPL
194718	2001 XQ_{247}	—	December 15, 2001	Socorro	LINEAR	·	2.1 km	MPC · JPL
194719	2001 XU_{247}	—	December 15, 2001	Socorro	LINEAR	·	2.1 km	MPC · JPL
194720	2001 XY_{247}	—	December 15, 2001	Socorro	LINEAR	·	3.4 km	MPC · JPL
194721	2001 XG_{248}	—	December 14, 2001	Kitt Peak	Spacewatch	·	1.9 km	MPC · JPL
194722	2001 XH_{250}	—	December 14, 2001	Socorro	LINEAR	·	2.0 km	MPC · JPL
194723	2001 XR_{253}	—	December 14, 2001	Socorro	LINEAR	NYS	1.7 km	MPC · JPL
194724	2001 XR_{257}	—	December 7, 2001	Palomar	NEAT	3:2	7.1 km	MPC · JPL
194725	2001 XE_{258}	—	December 8, 2001	Anderson Mesa	LONEOS	·	2.1 km	MPC · JPL
194726	2001 XT_{258}	—	December 8, 2001	Anderson Mesa	LONEOS	·	1.1 km	MPC · JPL
194727	2001 XU_{259}	—	December 9, 2001	Anderson Mesa	LONEOS	·	1.6 km	MPC · JPL
194728	2001 XG_{263}	—	December 14, 2001	Kitt Peak	Spacewatch	·	1.3 km	MPC · JPL
194729	2001 XX_{263}	—	December 14, 2001	Socorro	LINEAR	·	1.3 km	MPC · JPL
194730	2001 XO_{265}	—	December 14, 2001	Socorro	LINEAR	NYS	1.5 km	MPC · JPL
194731	2001 YB	—	December 16, 2001	Oaxaca	Roe, J. M.	NYS	1.4 km	MPC · JPL
194732	2001 YL_{3}	—	December 19, 2001	Fountain Hills	C. W. Juels, P. R. Holvorcem	PHO	2.0 km	MPC · JPL
194733	2001 YH_{5}	—	December 17, 2001	Cima Ekar	ADAS	·	1.4 km	MPC · JPL
194734	2001 YS_{7}	—	December 17, 2001	Socorro	LINEAR	·	1.7 km	MPC · JPL
194735	2001 YQ_{8}	—	December 17, 2001	Socorro	LINEAR	·	1.7 km	MPC · JPL
194736	2001 YS_{14}	—	December 17, 2001	Socorro	LINEAR	·	1.7 km	MPC · JPL
194737	2001 YM_{16}	—	December 17, 2001	Socorro	LINEAR	MAS	890 m	MPC · JPL
194738	2001 YD_{18}	—	December 17, 2001	Socorro	LINEAR	MAS	1.1 km	MPC · JPL
194739	2001 YD_{20}	—	December 18, 2001	Socorro	LINEAR	NYS	1.2 km	MPC · JPL
194740	2001 YE_{20}	—	December 18, 2001	Socorro	LINEAR	·	1.9 km	MPC · JPL
194741	2001 YH_{20}	—	December 18, 2001	Socorro	LINEAR	3:2 · SHU	7.4 km	MPC · JPL
194742	2001 YN_{20}	—	December 18, 2001	Socorro	LINEAR	3:2 · SHU	7.6 km	MPC · JPL
194743	2001 YD_{21}	—	December 18, 2001	Socorro	LINEAR	3:2 · SHU	7.3 km	MPC · JPL
194744	2001 YQ_{21}	—	December 18, 2001	Socorro	LINEAR	·	1.1 km	MPC · JPL
194745	2001 YF_{22}	—	December 18, 2001	Socorro	LINEAR	MAS	1.3 km	MPC · JPL
194746	2001 YJ_{25}	—	December 18, 2001	Socorro	LINEAR	·	2.3 km	MPC · JPL
194747	2001 YV_{25}	—	December 18, 2001	Socorro	LINEAR	NYS	1.0 km	MPC · JPL
194748	2001 YT_{28}	—	December 18, 2001	Socorro	LINEAR	·	1.3 km	MPC · JPL
194749	2001 YU_{31}	—	December 18, 2001	Socorro	LINEAR	MAS	1.2 km	MPC · JPL
194750	2001 YC_{33}	—	December 18, 2001	Socorro	LINEAR	NYS	1.6 km	MPC · JPL
194751	2001 YT_{38}	—	December 18, 2001	Socorro	LINEAR	·	1.9 km	MPC · JPL
194752	2001 YU_{41}	—	December 18, 2001	Socorro	LINEAR	·	2.1 km	MPC · JPL
194753	2001 YU_{43}	—	December 18, 2001	Socorro	LINEAR	MAS	1.2 km	MPC · JPL
194754	2001 YD_{44}	—	December 18, 2001	Socorro	LINEAR	·	1.6 km	MPC · JPL
194755	2001 YJ_{44}	—	December 18, 2001	Socorro	LINEAR	·	2.0 km	MPC · JPL
194756	2001 YZ_{44}	—	December 18, 2001	Socorro	LINEAR	·	2.5 km	MPC · JPL
194757	2001 YJ_{46}	—	December 18, 2001	Socorro	LINEAR	·	1.5 km	MPC · JPL
194758	2001 YX_{47}	—	December 18, 2001	Socorro	LINEAR	·	2.0 km	MPC · JPL
194759	2001 YC_{49}	—	December 18, 2001	Socorro	LINEAR	NYS	1.4 km	MPC · JPL
194760	2001 YW_{49}	—	December 18, 2001	Socorro	LINEAR	·	1.5 km	MPC · JPL
194761	2001 YF_{50}	—	December 18, 2001	Socorro	LINEAR	·	1.4 km	MPC · JPL
194762	2001 YK_{52}	—	December 18, 2001	Socorro	LINEAR	·	2.7 km	MPC · JPL
194763	2001 YS_{52}	—	December 18, 2001	Socorro	LINEAR	·	2.4 km	MPC · JPL
194764	2001 YV_{52}	—	December 18, 2001	Socorro	LINEAR	NYS	1.7 km	MPC · JPL
194765	2001 YK_{54}	—	December 18, 2001	Socorro	LINEAR	NYS	2.4 km	MPC · JPL
194766	2001 YG_{56}	—	December 18, 2001	Socorro	LINEAR	·	1.7 km	MPC · JPL
194767	2001 YR_{59}	—	December 18, 2001	Socorro	LINEAR	NYS	2.3 km	MPC · JPL
194768	2001 YZ_{59}	—	December 18, 2001	Socorro	LINEAR	NYS	1.6 km	MPC · JPL
194769	2001 YB_{64}	—	December 18, 2001	Socorro	LINEAR	NYS	1.5 km	MPC · JPL
194770	2001 YE_{64}	—	December 18, 2001	Socorro	LINEAR	NYS	1.8 km	MPC · JPL
194771	2001 YW_{64}	—	December 18, 2001	Socorro	LINEAR	NYS	1.4 km	MPC · JPL
194772	2001 YZ_{64}	—	December 18, 2001	Socorro	LINEAR	·	1.9 km	MPC · JPL
194773	2001 YC_{67}	—	December 18, 2001	Socorro	LINEAR	·	2.9 km	MPC · JPL
194774	2001 YD_{69}	—	December 18, 2001	Socorro	LINEAR	·	2.1 km	MPC · JPL
194775	2001 YD_{70}	—	December 18, 2001	Socorro	LINEAR	·	1.5 km	MPC · JPL
194776	2001 YG_{72}	—	December 18, 2001	Socorro	LINEAR	NYS	1.5 km	MPC · JPL
194777	2001 YA_{74}	—	December 18, 2001	Socorro	LINEAR	·	1.3 km	MPC · JPL
194778	2001 YP_{80}	—	December 18, 2001	Socorro	LINEAR	·	2.7 km	MPC · JPL
194779	2001 YW_{80}	—	December 18, 2001	Socorro	LINEAR	NYS	2.1 km	MPC · JPL
194780	2001 YV_{81}	—	December 18, 2001	Socorro	LINEAR	MAS	1.3 km	MPC · JPL
194781	2001 YA_{82}	—	December 18, 2001	Socorro	LINEAR	·	2.7 km	MPC · JPL
194782	2001 YN_{82}	—	December 18, 2001	Socorro	LINEAR	·	1.4 km	MPC · JPL
194783	2001 YZ_{82}	—	December 18, 2001	Socorro	LINEAR	NYS	1.7 km	MPC · JPL
194784	2001 YE_{83}	—	December 18, 2001	Socorro	LINEAR	·	1.5 km	MPC · JPL
194785	2001 YQ_{83}	—	December 18, 2001	Socorro	LINEAR	·	1.2 km	MPC · JPL
194786	2001 YR_{84}	—	December 18, 2001	Socorro	LINEAR	·	1.8 km	MPC · JPL
194787	2001 YD_{87}	—	December 18, 2001	Socorro	LINEAR	NYS	2.3 km	MPC · JPL
194788	2001 YG_{88}	—	December 18, 2001	Socorro	LINEAR	MAS	1.1 km	MPC · JPL
194789	2001 YU_{89}	—	December 18, 2001	Socorro	LINEAR	·	1.6 km	MPC · JPL
194790	2001 YV_{89}	—	December 18, 2001	Socorro	LINEAR	ULA · CYB	11 km	MPC · JPL
194791	2001 YB_{90}	—	December 18, 2001	Socorro	LINEAR	NYS ·	3.0 km	MPC · JPL
194792	2001 YL_{90}	—	December 18, 2001	Socorro	LINEAR	·	2.0 km	MPC · JPL
194793	2001 YP_{90}	—	December 18, 2001	Socorro	LINEAR	MAS	1 km	MPC · JPL
194794	2001 YN_{91}	—	December 17, 2001	Palomar	NEAT	NYS	2.1 km	MPC · JPL
194795	2001 YU_{94}	—	December 17, 2001	Palomar	NEAT	NYS	1.4 km	MPC · JPL
194796	2001 YV_{94}	—	December 17, 2001	Palomar	NEAT	·	1.6 km	MPC · JPL
194797	2001 YZ_{96}	—	December 17, 2001	Socorro	LINEAR	V	980 m	MPC · JPL
194798	2001 YW_{97}	—	December 17, 2001	Socorro	LINEAR	·	2.3 km	MPC · JPL
194799	2001 YS_{99}	—	December 17, 2001	Socorro	LINEAR	·	2.5 km	MPC · JPL
194800	2001 YX_{99}	—	December 17, 2001	Socorro	LINEAR	MAS	970 m	MPC · JPL

== 194801–194900 ==
back to top

Designation			Discovery			Properties		Ref
Permanent	Provisional	Named after	Date	Site	Discoverer(s)	Category	Diam.	Ref
194801	2001 YX_{101}	—	December 17, 2001	Socorro	LINEAR	·	2.4 km	MPC · JPL
194802	2001 YT_{102}	—	December 17, 2001	Socorro	LINEAR	·	1.5 km	MPC · JPL
194803	2001 YJ_{103}	—	December 17, 2001	Socorro	LINEAR	·	2.0 km	MPC · JPL
194804	2001 YL_{103}	—	December 17, 2001	Socorro	LINEAR	·	1.7 km	MPC · JPL
194805	2001 YS_{103}	—	December 17, 2001	Socorro	LINEAR	·	2.5 km	MPC · JPL
194806	2001 YA_{104}	—	December 17, 2001	Socorro	LINEAR	MAS	970 m	MPC · JPL
194807	2001 YH_{104}	—	December 17, 2001	Socorro	LINEAR	·	2.0 km	MPC · JPL
194808	2001 YC_{106}	—	December 17, 2001	Socorro	LINEAR	·	2.0 km	MPC · JPL
194809	2001 YD_{106}	—	December 17, 2001	Socorro	LINEAR	·	1.4 km	MPC · JPL
194810	2001 YQ_{106}	—	December 17, 2001	Socorro	LINEAR	·	1.9 km	MPC · JPL
194811	2001 YS_{106}	—	December 17, 2001	Socorro	LINEAR	NYS	1.4 km	MPC · JPL
194812	2001 YC_{107}	—	December 17, 2001	Socorro	LINEAR	·	2.9 km	MPC · JPL
194813	2001 YL_{109}	—	December 18, 2001	Socorro	LINEAR	NYS	2.3 km	MPC · JPL
194814	2001 YS_{109}	—	December 18, 2001	Socorro	LINEAR	NYS	2.0 km	MPC · JPL
194815	2001 YR_{112}	—	December 18, 2001	Anderson Mesa	LONEOS	EUN	2.4 km	MPC · JPL
194816	2001 YJ_{116}	—	December 17, 2001	Socorro	LINEAR	NYS	1.4 km	MPC · JPL
194817	2001 YA_{117}	—	December 18, 2001	Socorro	LINEAR	·	2.4 km	MPC · JPL
194818	2001 YP_{117}	—	December 18, 2001	Socorro	LINEAR	NYS	2.2 km	MPC · JPL
194819	2001 YQ_{117}	—	December 18, 2001	Socorro	LINEAR	NYS	1.7 km	MPC · JPL
194820	2001 YT_{117}	—	December 18, 2001	Socorro	LINEAR	·	2.0 km	MPC · JPL
194821	2001 YT_{120}	—	December 20, 2001	Socorro	LINEAR	·	3.1 km	MPC · JPL
194822	2001 YO_{123}	—	December 17, 2001	Socorro	LINEAR	·	1.8 km	MPC · JPL
194823	2001 YY_{123}	—	December 17, 2001	Socorro	LINEAR	·	1.8 km	MPC · JPL
194824	2001 YU_{124}	—	December 17, 2001	Socorro	LINEAR	·	1.3 km	MPC · JPL
194825	2001 YD_{127}	—	December 17, 2001	Socorro	LINEAR	SUL	3.4 km	MPC · JPL
194826	2001 YJ_{128}	—	December 17, 2001	Socorro	LINEAR	·	2.2 km	MPC · JPL
194827	2001 YS_{130}	—	December 17, 2001	Socorro	LINEAR	·	2.0 km	MPC · JPL
194828	2001 YM_{131}	—	December 18, 2001	Socorro	LINEAR	·	1.7 km	MPC · JPL
194829	2001 YX_{131}	—	December 19, 2001	Socorro	LINEAR	·	2.6 km	MPC · JPL
194830	2001 YL_{141}	—	December 17, 2001	Socorro	LINEAR	V	1.1 km	MPC · JPL
194831	2001 YO_{143}	—	December 17, 2001	Socorro	LINEAR	·	1.8 km	MPC · JPL
194832	2001 YY_{151}	—	December 19, 2001	Palomar	NEAT	·	1.6 km	MPC · JPL
194833	2001 YL_{152}	—	December 19, 2001	Palomar	NEAT	·	2.6 km	MPC · JPL
194834	2001 YY_{155}	—	December 20, 2001	Palomar	NEAT	·	2.3 km	MPC · JPL
194835	2001 YZ_{157}	—	December 18, 2001	Apache Point	SDSS	·	1.7 km	MPC · JPL
194836	2001 YP_{161}	—	December 17, 2001	Socorro	LINEAR	·	2.3 km	MPC · JPL
194837 Paolomasetti	2002 AJ	Paolomasetti	January 4, 2002	San Marcello	M. Tombelli, A. Boattini	·	1.2 km	MPC · JPL
194838	2002 AU_{3}	—	January 8, 2002	Oizumi	T. Kobayashi	·	1.8 km	MPC · JPL
194839	2002 AB_{4}	—	January 5, 2002	Socorro	LINEAR	·	4.5 km	MPC · JPL
194840	2002 AA_{6}	—	January 4, 2002	Palomar	NEAT	·	2.0 km	MPC · JPL
194841	2002 AP_{10}	—	January 5, 2002	Haleakala	NEAT	·	1.7 km	MPC · JPL
194842	2002 AX_{10}	—	January 11, 2002	Desert Eagle	W. K. Y. Yeung	·	1.9 km	MPC · JPL
194843	2002 AW_{12}	—	January 10, 2002	Campo Imperatore	CINEOS	NYS	1.8 km	MPC · JPL
194844	2002 AB_{13}	—	January 11, 2002	Campo Imperatore	CINEOS	MAS	950 m	MPC · JPL
194845	2002 AW_{15}	—	January 4, 2002	Haleakala	NEAT	·	1.9 km	MPC · JPL
194846	2002 AY_{16}	—	January 5, 2002	Haleakala	NEAT	V	1.2 km	MPC · JPL
194847	2002 AM_{17}	—	January 15, 2002	Socorro	LINEAR	·	1.8 km	MPC · JPL
194848	2002 AU_{18}	—	January 13, 2002	Oizumi	T. Kobayashi	·	3.2 km	MPC · JPL
194849	2002 AN_{20}	—	January 6, 2002	Palomar	NEAT	·	3.1 km	MPC · JPL
194850	2002 AW_{23}	—	January 6, 2002	Haleakala	NEAT	NYS	1.6 km	MPC · JPL
194851	2002 AU_{24}	—	January 8, 2002	Palomar	NEAT	PHO	3.8 km	MPC · JPL
194852	2002 AZ_{24}	—	January 8, 2002	Palomar	NEAT	·	1.7 km	MPC · JPL
194853	2002 AB_{25}	—	January 8, 2002	Palomar	NEAT	·	2.5 km	MPC · JPL
194854	2002 AC_{25}	—	January 8, 2002	Palomar	NEAT	·	1.9 km	MPC · JPL
194855	2002 AE_{28}	—	January 7, 2002	Anderson Mesa	LONEOS	(5)	2.2 km	MPC · JPL
194856	2002 AM_{28}	—	January 7, 2002	Anderson Mesa	LONEOS	·	2.3 km	MPC · JPL
194857	2002 AL_{29}	—	January 8, 2002	Socorro	LINEAR	PHO	4.3 km	MPC · JPL
194858	2002 AB_{32}	—	January 10, 2002	Bergisch Gladbach	W. Bickel	NYS	2.0 km	MPC · JPL
194859	2002 AQ_{35}	—	January 8, 2002	Socorro	LINEAR	MAS	1.1 km	MPC · JPL
194860	2002 AF_{36}	—	January 9, 2002	Socorro	LINEAR	3:2 · SHU	10 km	MPC · JPL
194861	2002 AX_{38}	—	January 9, 2002	Socorro	LINEAR	V	1.0 km	MPC · JPL
194862	2002 AY_{39}	—	January 9, 2002	Socorro	LINEAR	·	2.4 km	MPC · JPL
194863	2002 AA_{40}	—	January 9, 2002	Socorro	LINEAR	NYS	1.8 km	MPC · JPL
194864	2002 AY_{40}	—	January 9, 2002	Socorro	LINEAR	·	1.3 km	MPC · JPL
194865	2002 AL_{42}	—	January 9, 2002	Socorro	LINEAR	·	1.6 km	MPC · JPL
194866	2002 AN_{42}	—	January 9, 2002	Socorro	LINEAR	·	1.9 km	MPC · JPL
194867	2002 AO_{42}	—	January 9, 2002	Socorro	LINEAR	·	1.1 km	MPC · JPL
194868	2002 AH_{45}	—	January 9, 2002	Socorro	LINEAR	NYS	1.6 km	MPC · JPL
194869	2002 AH_{50}	—	January 9, 2002	Socorro	LINEAR	·	2.3 km	MPC · JPL
194870	2002 AP_{50}	—	January 9, 2002	Socorro	LINEAR	·	1.2 km	MPC · JPL
194871	2002 AD_{51}	—	January 9, 2002	Socorro	LINEAR	MAS	1.4 km	MPC · JPL
194872	2002 AE_{56}	—	January 9, 2002	Socorro	LINEAR	NYS	1.4 km	MPC · JPL
194873	2002 AJ_{56}	—	January 9, 2002	Socorro	LINEAR	NYS	1.7 km	MPC · JPL
194874	2002 AV_{56}	—	January 9, 2002	Socorro	LINEAR	·	3.3 km	MPC · JPL
194875	2002 AJ_{57}	—	January 9, 2002	Socorro	LINEAR	·	3.0 km	MPC · JPL
194876	2002 AD_{58}	—	January 9, 2002	Socorro	LINEAR	·	2.1 km	MPC · JPL
194877	2002 AH_{58}	—	January 9, 2002	Socorro	LINEAR	NYS	2.3 km	MPC · JPL
194878	2002 AG_{69}	—	January 13, 2002	Kitt Peak	Spacewatch	·	1.3 km	MPC · JPL
194879	2002 AL_{70}	—	January 8, 2002	Socorro	LINEAR	·	1.5 km	MPC · JPL
194880	2002 AK_{72}	—	January 8, 2002	Socorro	LINEAR	MAS	1.1 km	MPC · JPL
194881	2002 AQ_{72}	—	January 8, 2002	Socorro	LINEAR	MAS	1.0 km	MPC · JPL
194882	2002 AA_{76}	—	January 8, 2002	Socorro	LINEAR	MAS	1.0 km	MPC · JPL
194883	2002 AU_{76}	—	January 8, 2002	Socorro	LINEAR	·	1.5 km	MPC · JPL
194884	2002 AW_{76}	—	January 8, 2002	Socorro	LINEAR	NYS	1.4 km	MPC · JPL
194885	2002 AJ_{77}	—	January 8, 2002	Socorro	LINEAR	NYS	1.8 km	MPC · JPL
194886	2002 AK_{78}	—	January 8, 2002	Socorro	LINEAR	·	1.6 km	MPC · JPL
194887	2002 AT_{79}	—	January 8, 2002	Socorro	LINEAR	·	1.8 km	MPC · JPL
194888	2002 AM_{81}	—	January 9, 2002	Socorro	LINEAR	ERI	2.1 km	MPC · JPL
194889	2002 AY_{81}	—	January 9, 2002	Socorro	LINEAR	·	1.8 km	MPC · JPL
194890	2002 AQ_{83}	—	January 9, 2002	Socorro	LINEAR	·	2.3 km	MPC · JPL
194891	2002 AW_{83}	—	January 9, 2002	Socorro	LINEAR	·	3.0 km	MPC · JPL
194892	2002 AP_{90}	—	January 12, 2002	Socorro	LINEAR	(5)	3.3 km	MPC · JPL
194893	2002 AX_{94}	—	January 8, 2002	Socorro	LINEAR	NYS	1.5 km	MPC · JPL
194894	2002 AM_{95}	—	January 8, 2002	Socorro	LINEAR	·	1.1 km	MPC · JPL
194895	2002 AR_{95}	—	January 8, 2002	Socorro	LINEAR	·	1.0 km	MPC · JPL
194896	2002 AW_{95}	—	January 8, 2002	Socorro	LINEAR	·	1.6 km	MPC · JPL
194897	2002 AF_{96}	—	January 8, 2002	Socorro	LINEAR	·	1.8 km	MPC · JPL
194898	2002 AB_{97}	—	January 8, 2002	Socorro	LINEAR	MAS	1.0 km	MPC · JPL
194899	2002 AG_{97}	—	January 8, 2002	Socorro	LINEAR	·	1.3 km	MPC · JPL
194900	2002 AB_{98}	—	January 8, 2002	Socorro	LINEAR	MAS	860 m	MPC · JPL

== 194901–195000 ==
back to top

Designation			Discovery			Properties		Ref
Permanent	Provisional	Named after	Date	Site	Discoverer(s)	Category	Diam.	Ref
194901	2002 AY_{98}	—	January 8, 2002	Socorro	LINEAR	·	1.7 km	MPC · JPL
194902	2002 AG_{99}	—	January 8, 2002	Socorro	LINEAR	·	2.4 km	MPC · JPL
194903	2002 AP_{103}	—	January 9, 2002	Socorro	LINEAR	NYS	1.4 km	MPC · JPL
194904	2002 AR_{105}	—	January 9, 2002	Socorro	LINEAR	MAS	940 m	MPC · JPL
194905	2002 AU_{105}	—	January 9, 2002	Socorro	LINEAR	MAS	940 m	MPC · JPL
194906	2002 AM_{106}	—	January 9, 2002	Socorro	LINEAR	·	1.1 km	MPC · JPL
194907	2002 AC_{107}	—	January 9, 2002	Socorro	LINEAR	·	1.8 km	MPC · JPL
194908	2002 AV_{107}	—	January 9, 2002	Socorro	LINEAR	·	2.0 km	MPC · JPL
194909	2002 AC_{110}	—	January 9, 2002	Socorro	LINEAR	MAS	1.4 km	MPC · JPL
194910	2002 AD_{112}	—	January 9, 2002	Socorro	LINEAR	·	2.2 km	MPC · JPL
194911	2002 AE_{113}	—	January 9, 2002	Socorro	LINEAR	NYS	1.8 km	MPC · JPL
194912	2002 AG_{114}	—	January 9, 2002	Socorro	LINEAR	V	1.3 km	MPC · JPL
194913	2002 AT_{115}	—	January 9, 2002	Socorro	LINEAR	NYS	2.0 km	MPC · JPL
194914	2002 AT_{120}	—	January 9, 2002	Socorro	LINEAR	·	2.4 km	MPC · JPL
194915	2002 AD_{121}	—	January 9, 2002	Socorro	LINEAR	NYS	1.6 km	MPC · JPL
194916	2002 AS_{121}	—	January 9, 2002	Socorro	LINEAR	NYS	2.1 km	MPC · JPL
194917	2002 AY_{121}	—	January 9, 2002	Socorro	LINEAR	·	1.6 km	MPC · JPL
194918	2002 AC_{122}	—	January 9, 2002	Socorro	LINEAR	·	2.0 km	MPC · JPL
194919	2002 AU_{122}	—	January 9, 2002	Socorro	LINEAR	·	1.6 km	MPC · JPL
194920	2002 AB_{124}	—	January 9, 2002	Socorro	LINEAR	·	3.1 km	MPC · JPL
194921	2002 AO_{124}	—	January 9, 2002	Socorro	LINEAR	·	1.8 km	MPC · JPL
194922	2002 AK_{125}	—	January 11, 2002	Socorro	LINEAR	H	850 m	MPC · JPL
194923	2002 AH_{126}	—	January 12, 2002	Socorro	LINEAR	V	790 m	MPC · JPL
194924	2002 AP_{128}	—	January 14, 2002	Desert Eagle	W. K. Y. Yeung	·	1.6 km	MPC · JPL
194925	2002 AS_{128}	—	January 14, 2002	Desert Eagle	W. K. Y. Yeung	·	4.2 km	MPC · JPL
194926	2002 AM_{133}	—	January 9, 2002	Socorro	LINEAR	·	2.1 km	MPC · JPL
194927	2002 AL_{134}	—	January 9, 2002	Socorro	LINEAR	3:2 · SHU	8.0 km	MPC · JPL
194928	2002 AQ_{134}	—	January 9, 2002	Socorro	LINEAR	MAS	1.2 km	MPC · JPL
194929	2002 AD_{137}	—	January 9, 2002	Socorro	LINEAR	·	3.0 km	MPC · JPL
194930	2002 AG_{137}	—	January 9, 2002	Socorro	LINEAR	MAS	920 m	MPC · JPL
194931	2002 AJ_{139}	—	January 9, 2002	Socorro	LINEAR	·	2.0 km	MPC · JPL
194932	2002 AQ_{139}	—	January 12, 2002	Socorro	LINEAR	·	1.5 km	MPC · JPL
194933	2002 AP_{141}	—	January 13, 2002	Socorro	LINEAR	·	1.9 km	MPC · JPL
194934	2002 AQ_{143}	—	January 13, 2002	Socorro	LINEAR	MAS	1.0 km	MPC · JPL
194935	2002 AP_{144}	—	January 13, 2002	Socorro	LINEAR	MAS	730 m	MPC · JPL
194936	2002 AE_{146}	—	January 13, 2002	Socorro	LINEAR	NYS	1.7 km	MPC · JPL
194937	2002 AH_{147}	—	January 14, 2002	Socorro	LINEAR	·	3.0 km	MPC · JPL
194938	2002 AG_{149}	—	January 14, 2002	Socorro	LINEAR	·	1.5 km	MPC · JPL
194939	2002 AH_{150}	—	January 14, 2002	Socorro	LINEAR	MAS	1.0 km	MPC · JPL
194940	2002 AU_{150}	—	January 14, 2002	Socorro	LINEAR	NYS	1.8 km	MPC · JPL
194941	2002 AW_{150}	—	January 14, 2002	Socorro	LINEAR	·	2.0 km	MPC · JPL
194942	2002 AE_{152}	—	January 14, 2002	Socorro	LINEAR	·	1.9 km	MPC · JPL
194943	2002 AF_{152}	—	January 14, 2002	Socorro	LINEAR	·	1.7 km	MPC · JPL
194944	2002 AB_{153}	—	January 14, 2002	Socorro	LINEAR	·	2.6 km	MPC · JPL
194945	2002 AM_{154}	—	January 14, 2002	Socorro	LINEAR	·	2.2 km	MPC · JPL
194946	2002 AD_{157}	—	January 13, 2002	Socorro	LINEAR	·	3.6 km	MPC · JPL
194947	2002 AR_{158}	—	January 13, 2002	Socorro	LINEAR	·	2.3 km	MPC · JPL
194948	2002 AE_{160}	—	January 13, 2002	Socorro	LINEAR	·	2.1 km	MPC · JPL
194949	2002 AW_{160}	—	January 13, 2002	Socorro	LINEAR	·	2.2 km	MPC · JPL
194950	2002 AX_{160}	—	January 13, 2002	Socorro	LINEAR	·	4.3 km	MPC · JPL
194951	2002 AV_{161}	—	January 13, 2002	Socorro	LINEAR	·	1.8 km	MPC · JPL
194952	2002 AT_{162}	—	January 13, 2002	Socorro	LINEAR	·	2.1 km	MPC · JPL
194953	2002 AA_{165}	—	January 13, 2002	Socorro	LINEAR	V	1.1 km	MPC · JPL
194954	2002 AS_{165}	—	January 13, 2002	Socorro	LINEAR	·	1.4 km	MPC · JPL
194955	2002 AE_{168}	—	January 14, 2002	Socorro	LINEAR	MAS	960 m	MPC · JPL
194956	2002 AO_{168}	—	January 14, 2002	Socorro	LINEAR	·	1.6 km	MPC · JPL
194957	2002 AT_{168}	—	January 15, 2002	Socorro	LINEAR	V	1.0 km	MPC · JPL
194958	2002 AL_{170}	—	January 14, 2002	Socorro	LINEAR	·	2.0 km	MPC · JPL
194959	2002 AK_{171}	—	January 14, 2002	Socorro	LINEAR	MAS	880 m	MPC · JPL
194960	2002 AM_{171}	—	January 14, 2002	Socorro	LINEAR	NYS	1.8 km	MPC · JPL
194961	2002 AS_{172}	—	January 14, 2002	Socorro	LINEAR	·	2.2 km	MPC · JPL
194962	2002 AM_{173}	—	January 14, 2002	Socorro	LINEAR	NYS	1.3 km	MPC · JPL
194963	2002 AD_{174}	—	January 14, 2002	Socorro	LINEAR	NYS	2.0 km	MPC · JPL
194964	2002 AV_{174}	—	January 14, 2002	Socorro	LINEAR	NYS	1.7 km	MPC · JPL
194965	2002 AX_{174}	—	January 14, 2002	Socorro	LINEAR	·	1.9 km	MPC · JPL
194966	2002 AU_{176}	—	January 14, 2002	Socorro	LINEAR	·	1.3 km	MPC · JPL
194967	2002 AN_{177}	—	January 14, 2002	Socorro	LINEAR	·	2.4 km	MPC · JPL
194968	2002 AQ_{178}	—	January 14, 2002	Socorro	LINEAR	·	3.7 km	MPC · JPL
194969	2002 AJ_{179}	—	January 14, 2002	Socorro	LINEAR	·	2.0 km	MPC · JPL
194970 Márai	2002 AY_{179}	Márai	January 13, 2002	Piszkéstető	K. Sárneczky, Z. Heiner	·	2.0 km	MPC · JPL
194971	2002 AY_{180}	—	January 5, 2002	Palomar	NEAT	PHO	1.3 km	MPC · JPL
194972	2002 AJ_{185}	—	January 8, 2002	Socorro	LINEAR	MAS	1.1 km	MPC · JPL
194973	2002 AF_{187}	—	January 8, 2002	Socorro	LINEAR	·	3.4 km	MPC · JPL
194974	2002 AL_{189}	—	January 10, 2002	Palomar	NEAT	·	4.8 km	MPC · JPL
194975	2002 AO_{190}	—	January 11, 2002	Desert Eagle	W. K. Y. Yeung	MAS	960 m	MPC · JPL
194976	2002 AW_{200}	—	January 9, 2002	Socorro	LINEAR	NYS	1.2 km	MPC · JPL
194977	2002 AT_{202}	—	January 13, 2002	Socorro	LINEAR	·	3.0 km	MPC · JPL
194978	2002 AU_{202}	—	January 13, 2002	Socorro	LINEAR	MAS	810 m	MPC · JPL
194979	2002 AE_{203}	—	January 11, 2002	Cima Ekar	ADAS	·	4.1 km	MPC · JPL
194980	2002 AS_{203}	—	January 12, 2002	Kitt Peak	Spacewatch	·	1.5 km	MPC · JPL
194981	2002 AU_{203}	—	January 12, 2002	Kitt Peak	Spacewatch	·	1.7 km	MPC · JPL
194982 Furia	2002 BH	Furia	January 19, 2002	Schiaparelli	L. Buzzi	·	2.6 km	MPC · JPL
194983	2002 BK	—	January 18, 2002	Powell	Powell	·	2.4 km	MPC · JPL
194984	2002 BO_{1}	—	January 19, 2002	Desert Eagle	W. K. Y. Yeung	·	2.5 km	MPC · JPL
194985	2002 BR_{1}	—	January 20, 2002	Desert Eagle	W. K. Y. Yeung	NYS	1.9 km	MPC · JPL
194986	2002 BC_{2}	—	January 19, 2002	Desert Eagle	W. K. Y. Yeung	NYS	1.5 km	MPC · JPL
194987	2002 BE_{6}	—	January 18, 2002	Socorro	LINEAR	·	2.9 km	MPC · JPL
194988	2002 BY_{6}	—	January 18, 2002	Socorro	LINEAR	KON	4.3 km	MPC · JPL
194989	2002 BZ_{6}	—	January 18, 2002	Socorro	LINEAR	T_{j} (2.98) · HIL · 3:2	7.4 km	MPC · JPL
194990	2002 BS_{7}	—	January 18, 2002	Socorro	LINEAR	·	1.5 km	MPC · JPL
194991	2002 BW_{7}	—	January 18, 2002	Socorro	LINEAR	NYS	2.0 km	MPC · JPL
194992	2002 BH_{8}	—	January 18, 2002	Socorro	LINEAR	MAS	1.1 km	MPC · JPL
194993	2002 BJ_{11}	—	January 19, 2002	Socorro	LINEAR	MAS	1.3 km	MPC · JPL
194994	2002 BN_{14}	—	January 19, 2002	Socorro	LINEAR	·	1.9 km	MPC · JPL
194995	2002 BJ_{15}	—	January 19, 2002	Socorro	LINEAR	·	1.6 km	MPC · JPL
194996	2002 BH_{16}	—	January 19, 2002	Socorro	LINEAR	·	1.6 km	MPC · JPL
194997	2002 BJ_{17}	—	January 20, 2002	Kitt Peak	Spacewatch	MAS	900 m	MPC · JPL
194998	2002 BS_{18}	—	January 21, 2002	Socorro	LINEAR	·	2.5 km	MPC · JPL
194999	2002 BO_{27}	—	January 20, 2002	Anderson Mesa	LONEOS	·	2.9 km	MPC · JPL
195000	2002 BZ_{27}	—	January 20, 2002	Anderson Mesa	LONEOS	·	2.4 km	MPC · JPL

back to top

== See also ==
- Meanings of minor-planet names: 194001–195000
