= Meanings of minor-planet names: 21001–22000 =

As minor planet discoveries are confirmed, they are given a permanent number by the IAU's Minor Planet Center (MPC), and the discoverers can then submit names for them, following the IAU's naming conventions. The list below concerns those minor planets in the specified number-range that have received names, and explains the meanings of those names.

Official naming citations of newly named small Solar System bodies are approved and published in a bulletin by IAU's Working Group for Small Bodies Nomenclature (WGSBN). Before May 2021, citations were published in MPC's Minor Planet Circulars for many decades. Recent citations can also be found on the JPL Small-Body Database (SBDB). Until his death in 2016, German astronomer Lutz D. Schmadel compiled these citations into the Dictionary of Minor Planet Names (DMP) and regularly updated the collection.

Based on Paul Herget's The Names of the Minor Planets, Schmadel also researched the unclear origin of numerous asteroids, most of which had been named prior to World War II. This article incorporates text from this source, which is in the public domain: SBDB New namings may only be added to this list below after official publication as the preannouncement of names is condemned. The WGSBN publishes a comprehensive guideline for the naming rules of non-cometary small Solar System bodies.

== 21001–21100 ==
Named minor planet	Provisional	This minor planet was named for...	Ref; Catalog
21001 Trogrlic	1987 GF	Yvan, Marie, Jean, Émilienne, Yvonne and Liliane Trogrlic, respectively grandfather, grandmother, uncle, mother and aunts of the discoverer	JPL · 21001
21004 Thérèsemarjou	1988 BM_{4}	Barbe-Thérèse Marjou (born 1755), wife of Pierre Méchain, a French astronomer.	IAU · 21004
21007 Lo Campo	1988 FD_{3}	Lo Campo (born 1965), Italian scientific journalist covering astronautics and astronomy	IAU · 21007
21008 Ottewell	1988 PE	Guy Ottewell, British educator who published his Astronomical Calendar every year from 1974 to 2026.	IAU · 21008
21009 Agilkia	1988 PN_{1}	Agilkia, the name of an island on the Nile in Egypt.	JPL · 21009
21010 Kishon	1988 PL_{2}	Ephraim Kishon, Israeli author, journalist, satirist, and script-writer	JPL · 21010
21011 Johannaterlinden	1988 RP_{4}	Johanna Helena Terlinden (1920-1989), wife of Dutch astronomer Theodore Walraven.	JPL · 21011
21014 Daishi	1988 TS_{1}	Daishi grade school, Kōchi, Japan, attended by the discoverer 1937–1943	JPL · 21014
21015 Shigenari	1988 UF	Shigenari Oonishi (born 1946) is a famous illustrator, who has designed many record covers. He opened his private art museum, Shigechan Land, in his hometown (Tsubetsu town, Hokkaido, Japan) in 2001.	JPL · 21015
21016 Miyazawaseiroku	1988 VA	Seiroku Miyazawa, Japanese publisher, brother of Kenji Miyazawa, the author of Night On The Milky Way Train and The Twin Stars	JPL · 21016
21022 Ike	1989 CR	Koichi Ike, Japanese friend and assistant of the discoverer	JPL · 21022
21029 Adorno	1989 TA_{6}	Theodor W. Adorno (1903–1969), German philosopher and musicologist, was a leading figure in the Frankfurter Schule of critical theory.	JPL · 21029
21033 Akahirakiyozo	1989 UM	Kiyozo Akahira (born 1941) is a science historian and an amateur astronomer. He has been a high school teacher of physics for more than 35 years.	JPL · 21033
21035 Iwabu	1990 AE	Shimeichi Iwabu (born 1914) became enthralled with total eclipses after witnessing his first in Hokkaido in 1963.	JPL · 21035
21036 Nakamurayoshi	1990 BA_{2}	Yoshihiro Nakamura (born 1947) retired from his planetarium manufacturing company in 2007 and is now well known as an amateur astronomer in Chiba Prefecture.	JPL · 21036
21038 Bazzano	1990 EP_{3}	Angela Bazzano, Italian astrophysicist.	IAU · 21038
21039 Zank	1990 ES_{4}	Gary Zank, American space physicist.	IAU · 21039
21040 Güntherreitz	1990 OZ	Günther Reitz, German biophysicist.	IAU · 21040
21041 Wangjinsong	1990 QO_{1}	Wang Jinsong, Chinese space physicist and meteorologist.	IAU · 21041
21042 Sibeck	1990 QT_{7}	David Gary Sibeck, American space physicist.	IAU · 21042
21043 Pascalwillis	1990 RT_{2}	Pascal Willis, French geodesist.	IAU · 21043
21044 Rummel	1990 SE_{1}	John Rummel, American exobiologist.	IAU · 21044
21045 Juangabriel	1990 SQ_{1}	Juan Carlos Gabriel, Argentinean-German high-energy physicist who has been engaged with COSPAR’s Panel on Capacity Building activities for 25 years as lecturer, Vice-Chair, and then Chair.	IAU · 21045
21047 Hodierna	1990 SE_{5}	Giovanni Batista Hodierna, Italian (Sicilian) mathematician and astronomer.	JPL · 21047
21050 Beck	1990 TG_{2}	Hans G. Beck, German astronomer and head of the department for astronomical instruments of Carl Zeiss, Jena	JPL · 21050
21054 Ojmjakon	1990 VL_{5}	The coldest city on earth, Ojmjakon, lies in the Republic of Yakutia (Siberia, Russia), in the valley of the upper Indigirka river, at 740 metres above sea level. With an average temperature of -48oC in January, it has a lowest record of -70oC.	JPL · 21054
21057 Garikisraelian	1991 GJ_{8}	Garik Israelian (born 1963), an astrophysicist at the Institute of Astrophysics, Tenerife, known for his studies of stellar abundances and observational evidence of the supernova origin of black holes.	JPL · 21057
21059 Penderecki	1991 GR_{10}	Krzysztof Penderecki, Polish composer and conductor	JPL · 21059
21062 Iasky	1991 JW_{1}	Robert Iasky (born 1956), geophysicist with the Geological Survey of Western Australia, discovered the 120 km-diameter late Devonian Woodleigh impact structure in the Carnarvon Basin. In addition, he has found other probable impact structures, one in the Carnarvon Basin and two in the western Officer Basin.	JPL · 21062
21064 Yangliwei	1991 LY_{1}	Yang Liwei, first Chinese citizen in space †	MPC · 21064
21065 Jamesmelka	1991 NM	James Melka (born 1942), an amateur astronomer.	JPL · 21065
21073 Darksky	1991 RE	Part of a worldwide initiative, Dark Sky Scotland promotes the use of Scotland's dark rural areas for astronomy outreach. Its events encourage the public to enjoy the night sky and learn how astronomers are exploring the wonders of the Universe	JPL · 21073
21074 Rügen	1991 RA_{4}	The island of Rügen in the Baltic Sea, a popular resort	JPL · 21074
21075 Heussinger	1991 RF_{4}	Adalbert Heussinger, Austrian Catholic Minorite, theologian and philosopher	JPL · 21075
21076 Kokoschka	1991 RG_{4}	Oskar Kokoschka, Austrian Expressionist painter and poet	JPL · 21076
21082 Araimasaru	1991 TG_{2}	Masaru Arai, Japanese amateur astronomer, discoverer of comet C/1991 A2	JPL · 21082
21087 Petsimpallas	1992 BH_{2}	Peter Simon Pallas, 18th/19th-century German naturalist and explorer, discoverer of pallasites, Pallas's cat and several other animals and plants	JPL · 21087
21088 Chelyabinsk	1992 BL_{2}	Chelyabinsk, a city in the Urals, Siberia.	JPL · 21088
21089 Mochizuki	1992 CQ	Seiji Mochizuki, Japanese designer of the 0.6-m reflector at Geisei Observatory	JPL · 21089

== 21101–21200 ==
back to top

Named minor planet	Provisional	This minor planet was named for...	Ref; Catalog
21104 Sveshnikov	1992 PY	Mikhail Leonidovich Sveshnikov (born 1941) is a well-known expert in celestial mechanics and astrometry. He is Editor-in-Chief of the Russian Naval Astronomical Almanac. From 2001 to 2004, he headed the Laboratory of the astronomical yearbooks of the Institute of Applied Astronomy of the Russian Academy of Sciences	JPL · 21104
21109 Sünkel	1992 RY	Hans Sünkel (born 1948), an Austrian mathematical geodesist and geoinformatician	JPL · 21109
21110 Karlvalentin	1992 RC_{1}	Karl Valentin (1882–1948), German (Bavarian) actor, comedian, and writer	JPL · 21110
21114 Bernson	1992 RS_{5}	Reysa Bernson (1904–1944) had a passion for science and after an encounter with Flammarion, who inspired her for astronomy, she founded the Astronomical Association of the North. During the 1937 Universal Exposition she directed the Paris planetarium.This led to the foundation of many new planetaria.	JPL · 21114
21117 Tashimaseizo	1992 SB_{13}	Seizo Tashima (born 1940) is well known as an author of illustrated books. He has won many national and international prizes for his books and pictures.	JPL · 21117
21118 Hezimmermann	1992 SB_{17}	Helmut Zimmermann (1926–2011), a German astronomer and director of the Jena Observatory from 1969 to 1978. His research included the interstellar medium and the collision of clouds. He was instrumental in the new study course of astronomy for student teachers in Germany.	JPL · 21118
21120 Naritaatsushi	1992 WP	Atsushi Narita (born 1951), a Japanese amateur astronomer. He is known for his two-point observational pictures of meteors.	IAU · 21120
21121 Andoshoeki	1992 WV	Andō Shōeki (1703–1762) was a doctor and one of the foremost philosophers of early modern Japan. He desired to create an equal and peaceful symbiotic society based on people's mutual aid.	IAU · 21121
21125 Orff	1992 YZ_{4}	Carl Orff (1895–1982), German composer, best known for his Carmina Burana	JPL · 21125
21126 Katsuyoshi	1993 BJ_{2}	Katsuyoshi Yoshimi (born 1951) is an amateur astrophotographer and has contributed to many minor-planet discoveries at Geisei Observatory by hyper-sensitizing films for use at the observatory	JPL · 21126
21128 Chapuis	1993 BJ_{5}	Grégoire Chapuis (1761–1794), Belgian surgeon and educator, mayor of Verviers, beheaded for blasphemy for his promotion of civil weddings	JPL · 21128
21148 Billramsey	1993 HN_{1}	William ("Bill") D. Ramsey, American amateur astronomer who assisted in organizing the photographic glass plate archive of the 1.2-m Schmidt Oschin Telescope at Palomar Observatory	JPL · 21148
21149 Kenmitchell	1993 HY_{5}	Ken Mitchell, Australian geological field assistant for the Australian Geological Survey Organization and other exploration groups, who discovered the shatter cones at Lawn Hill, Queensland, and at Amelia Creek in the Davenport Ranges of the Northern Territory	JPL · 21149
21156 Didierlockwood	1993 QP_{7}	Didier Lockwood, French jazz violinist.	IAU · 21156
21160 Saveriolombardi	1993 TJ	An expert in physics and mathematics, Saverio Lombardi (born 1924) has always shared his knowledge and experience with the astronomers at St. Lucia	JPL · 21160
21161 Yamashitaharuo	1993 TR_{1}	Haruo Yamashita (born 1937) is the author of more than 500 works including novels and children's stories. He has been awarded many prizes including the Medal with Purple Ribbon from the Emperor of Japan.	JPL · 21161
21166 Nobuyukishouji	1993 XH	Nobuyuki Maeda (born 1957) and Shouji Higasioka (born 1958) are brothers living in Aki city in Kochi prefecture. Nobuyuki, formerly a high school teacher, teaches astronomy at Geisel Observatory. Shouji is a comet hunter and volunteers for astronomy outreach activities.	JPL · 21166
21182 Teshiogawa	1994 EC_{2}	Teshio River (Teshio-gawa) is a 256-km long river which runs through the northern part of Hokkaido into the Sea of Japan. Nayoro Observatory, equipped with the 1.6-m Pirka telescope, is located near this river.	JPL · 21182
21187 Setsuo	1994 FY	Setsuo Fukushima (born 1961) was moved by astronomical images he first saw in middle school. His work as a volunteer lecturer at the Children's Astronomical Classroom at the Takamatsu City Planetarium spans over ten years.	JPL · 21187
21188 Kiyohiro	1994 GN	Kiyohiro Kozai (born 1964) is well known as an enthusiastic amateur astronomer in Kagawa Prefecture. He is a popular lecturer to the families that come to hear him at the astronomical classrooms of his local community center.	JPL · 21188
21189 Robertonesci	1994 JB	Roberto Nesci (b. 1949), a former Italian professor of astrophysics at La Sapienza University of Rome.	IAU · 21189
21190 Martamaffei	1994 JQ	Marta Maffei (b. 1957), the founder of a cultural center for the promotion of scientific studies dedicated to her father, the Italian astronomer Paolo Maffei.	IAU · 21190
21192 Seccisergio	1994 NA	Sergio Secci (1956–1980) was a researcher and author who graduated with top honors at the University of Bologna	JPL · 21192

== 21201–21300 ==
back to top

Named minor planet	Provisional	This minor planet was named for...	Ref; Catalog
21219 Mascagni	1994 WV_{1}	Pietro Mascagni (1863–1945), an Italian conductor and composer.	JPL · 21219
21229 Sušil	1995 SM_{1}	František Sušil, Czech folklorist †	MPC · 21229
21234 Nakashima	1995 WG	Takashi Nakashima, Japanese amateur astronomer, member of the Kumamoto Civil Astronomical Observatory	JPL · 21234
21236 Moneta	1995 WE_{3}	Ernesto Teodoro Moneta (1833–1918) was an Italian journalist, revolutionary soldier and later a pacifist. He won the 1907 Nobel Peace Prize “for his work in the press and in peace meetings, both public and private, for an understanding between France and Italy.” His motto ‘In varietate unitas!’ later inspired the motto of the European Union.	IAU · 21236
21237 Suematsu	1995 WF_{5}	Kenji Suematsu (born 1966) teaches physics and earth sciences as a high school teacher in Nagasaki Prefecture. He is an enthusiastic teacher for students of all grades, from elementary through high school, and shows a particular passion for lectures on astronomy.	JPL · 21237
21238 Panarea	1995 WV_{7}	Panarea, a volcanic island placed in the south of Italy.	JPL · 21238
21250 Kamikouchi	1995 YQ_{2}	Kamikouchi, a Japanese scenic point nominated as a "Special Natural Treasure" in 1952	JPL · 21250
21254 Jonan	1996 BG_{2}	Jonan, Kumamoto, Japan, where the Kumamoto Civil Astronomical Observatory is located, on the occasion of the observatory's twentieth anniversary	JPL · 21254
21256 Robertobattiston	1996 CK_{7}	Roberto Battiston (born 1956) is an Italian experimental physicist specializing in detectors and technologies for fundamental, elementary and astroparticle physics. He holds the Chair of Experimental Physics at the University of Trento, and since 2014 has been President of the Italian Space Agency ASI.	JPL · 21256
21257 Jižní Čechy	1996 DS_{2}	Jižní Čechy, region of the Czech republic † ‡	MPC · 21257
21258 Huckins	1996 EH_{1}	Earle Knowlen Huckins III, American Deputy Associate Administrator in the Office of Space Science at NASA Headquarters	JPL · 21258
21262 Kanba	1996 HA_{2}	Minatsu Kanba, Japanese member of the Matsue Astronomy Club and an observing partner of the discoverer	JPL · 21262
21269 Bechini	1996 LG	Roberto Bechini, Italian amateur astronomer †	MPC · 21269
21270 Otokar	1996 OK	Otokar Březina (Václav Jebavý), Czech lyric poet, and one of the leaders of the symbolist movement † ‡	MPC · 21270
21272 Suyi	1996 SA_{1}	Su Yi, Professor Emeritus at Nankai University and a longtime advocate of astronomy education in China.	IAU · 21272
21275 Tosiyasu	1996 SJ_{7}	Tosiyasu Funakosi, Japanese amateur astronomer	JPL · 21275
21276 Feller	1996 TF_{5}	William (Vilim) Feller, Croatian-American mathematician	JPL · 21276
21282 Shimizuyuka	1996 TD_{15}	Yuka Shimizu (born 2009) is the discoverer's granddaughter. Yuka is interested in the constellations and enjoys watching the stars with her parents at Geisei Observatory's public viewing nights.	JPL · 21282
21284 Pandion	1996 TC_{51}	Pandion was a Greek fighter who helped Menestheus, the leader of the Athenian soldiers, to escape from the attack by Sarpedon	JPL · 21284
21287 Santa-Lucia	1996 UU_{3}	Santa-Lucia, a small Italian village on the green hills of Stroncone where a famous olive oil is produced.	IAU · 21287
21289 Giacomel	1996 VB_{1}	Luigino Giacomel, an engineer for the Italian company European Industrial Engineering.	JPL · 21289
21290 Vydra	1996 VR_{1}	The Vydra, a river in southern Bohemia, Czech Republic † ‡	MPC · 21290
21291 Mercalli	1996 VG_{6}	Luca Mercalli (born 1966), an Italian meteorologist, climatologist and science communicator.	IAU · 21291
21292 Kanetakoichi	1996 VQ_{8}	Koichi Kaneta (born 1946) became enthralled with total eclipses after witnessing his first in Hokkaido, Japan in 1963. Since then, he has taken part in solar eclipse expeditions to every corner of the world. In China, he witnessed the 2009 total eclipse on what was his sixth expedition.	IAU · 21292
21293 Fujimototoyoshi	1996 VS_{8}	Toyoshi Fujimoto (born 1960) worked for 37 years as a science teacher in a Japanese elementary school. He guided young people in astronomical observations and raised their interest in astronomy.	IAU · 21293
21294 Yamaguchiyuko	1996 VZ_{8}	Yuko Yamaguchi (1952–2019) was an artist who painted wooden tablets that were offered to a Shinto shrine or Buddhist temple when praying for divine protection. She was also active as an amateur astronomer in Hida Furukawa, Japan.	IAU · 21294

== 21301–21400 ==
back to top

Named minor planet	Provisional	This minor planet was named for...	Ref; Catalog
21301 Zanin	1996 WE_{3}	Antonio Zanin (1921–1997) was a respected Italian entrepreneur, active in the field of mechanical engineering and manufacturing and distinctly remembered by his employers for his ability to establish sincere and humane relationships	JPL · 21301
21302 Shirakamisanchi	1996 XU	Shirakamisanchi is a mountain district spreading over Aomori Prefecture and Akita Prefecture, Japan. It is famous for a primeval forest of beech trees and was registered as a World Nature Heritage site in 1993	JPL · 21302
21306 Marani	1996 XF_{2}	Giorgio "Doddo" Marani, Italian mechanic, friend of the discoverer	JPL · 21306
21311 Servius	1996 XC_{9}	Servius Tullius, sixth king of Rome, who constructed the first wall around the city	JPL · 21311
21313 Xiuyanyu	1996 XY_{14}	Xiuyanyu, a reputed kind of jade produced in Xiuyan County, in northeastern China	JPL · 21313
21326 Nitta-machi	1997 AW_{6}	Nitta-machi was a town with a population of 29,000 in county Nitta-Gun county, in the southeastern part of Gunma prefecture. In 2005, the town merged with Ota city, Ojima town and Yabuzuka-Honmachi town.	JPL · 21326
21327 Yabuzuka	1997 AJ_{13}	Yabuzuka, the abbreviated name for Yabuzuka-Honmachi town, in Nitta-Gun county, in the southeastern part of Gunma prefecture, had a population of 19 \, 000. In 2005 the town became part of new Ota city, when it merged with Ota city, Ojima town and Nitta town.	JPL · 21327
21328 Otashi	1997 AM_{13}	Ota, Gunma prefecture, Japan	JPL · 21328
21330 Alanwhitman	1997 AT_{20}	Alan Douglas Whitman (born 1946), a Canadian amateur astronomer and former weather service officer.	JPL · 21330
21331 Lodovicoferrari	1997 BO	Lodovico Ferrari, 16th-century Italian mathematician	JPL · 21331
21336 Andyblanchard	1997 BU_{8}	Andy Blanchard (born 1956) founded AstroCATS, an annualtelescope exhibit, in 2013, and won a Service Award from the Royal Astronomical Society of Canada in 2016.	JPL · 21336
21337 Sansepolcro	1997 BN_{9}	Sansepolcro, a town located in Tuscany, Italy, and a centre of the Italian Renaissance and birthplace of Piero della Francesca.	JPL · 21337
21346 Marieladislav	1997 EL_{11}	Marie Pravcová and Ladislav Pravec, parents of the discoverer †	MPC · 21346
21348 Toyoteru	1997 EM_{25}	Toyoteru is a district in Niigata city, Niigata prefecture, famous for the festival Niigata So-Odori, which dates back to the seventeenth century. In Toyoteru, there is Japan's first child-daycare facility, Akazawa Hoikuen, established in 1890	JPL · 21348
21349 Bevoke	1997 ER_{31}	John Beverly "Bev" Oke (1928–2004) did his PhD at Princeton University and had an outstanding career in spectroscopy and instrument design for large telescopes.	JPL · 21349
21350 Billgardner	1997 EN_{32}	William David Anstruther Gardner (born 1974), an amateur astronomer in Ingersoll, Ontario, active in the Royal Astronomical Society of Canada, London Centre.	JPL · 21350
21351 Bhagwat	1997 EC_{36}	Samuel Mohun Bhagwat, American finalist in the 2005 Intel Science Talent Search (ISTS) † ‡	MPC · 21351
21355 Pikovskaya	1997 FZ_{3}	Olga Pikovskaya, American finalist in the 2005 ISTS †	MPC · 21355
21356 Karlplank	1997 FG_{4}	Karl James Plank, American finalist in the 2005 ISTS †	MPC · 21356
21357 Davidying	1997 FJ_{4}	David Qianli Ying, American finalist in the 2005 ISTS †	MPC · 21357
21358 Mijerbarany	1997 GT_{15}	Michael Jeremy Barany, American finalist in the 2005 ISTS †	MPC · 21358
21359 Geng	1997 GN_{22}	Sherri Yifan Geng, American finalist in the 2005 ISTS †	MPC · 21359
21360 Bobduff	1997 GW_{30}	Robert Ian Duff (born 1946) is an amateur astronomer who has served as Librarian and Outreach Coordinator for the Royal Astronomical Society of Canada, London Centre.	JPL · 21360
21361 Carsonmark	1997 HQ	Jordan Carson Mark (1913–1997) worked as a physicist and administrator at Los Alamos National Laboratory and as an advisor on the safety of nuclear reactors..	JPL · 21361
21362 Dickarmstrong	1997 HS_{3}	Richard Lee Armstrong (1937–1991) studied radiogenic isotope geochemistry, geology of the American Cordillera, geochronology, and Earth's geochemical evolution.	JPL · 21362
21363 Jotwani	1997 HX_{11}	Pooja Sunil Jotwani, American finalist in the 2005 ISTS †	MPC · 21363
21364 Lingpan	1997 HS_{12}	Ling Pan, American finalist in the 2005 ISTS †	MPC · 21364
21367 Edwardpleva	1997 LU_{1}	Edward Gustav Pleva (1912–2008), a geography educator who taught for 39 years at Western University and was editor of The Canadian Oxford School Atlas. JPL	MPC · 21367
21368 Shiodayama	1997 LE_{10}	Shiodayama is a 406-m mountain located in the north of the discoverer's home town, Shirataka, Yamagata prefecture, Japan	JPL · 21368
21369 Gertfinger	1997 NO_{4}	Gert Finger, of the European Southern Observatory, leader in the use of infrared sensors in the highest quality instrumentation	JPL · 21369
21375 Fanshawe	1997 YZ_{17}	Located in London, Canada, Fanshawe College was founded in 1967, and developed a particular reputation for arts, media, landscape design and hospitality studies. Name suggested by R. and P. Jedicke.	JPL · 21375
21380 Devanssay	1998 DB_{20}	Jean Benoît De Vanssay, French amateur astronomer and optician	JPL · 21380
21387 Wafakhalil	1998 FW_{16}	Wafa Khalil, Intel International Science and Engineering Fair (ISEF) Excellence in Teaching Award winner for 2004 †	MPC · 21387
21388 Moyanodeburt	1998 FJ_{25}	Maria Adela Moyano de Burt, Intel ISEF Excellence in Teaching Award winner for 2004 †	MPC · 21388
21389 Pshenichka	1998 FX_{27}	Paul Pshenichka, Intel ISEF Excellence in Teaching Award winner for 2004 †	MPC · 21389
21390 Shindo	1998 FV_{28}	Shindo Akihiko, Intel ISEF Excellence in Teaching Award winner for 2004 †	MPC · 21390
21391 Rotanner	1998 FY_{31}	Roberta Tanner, Intel ISEF Excellence in Teaching Award winner for 2004 †	MPC · 21391
21392 Helibrochier	1998 FH_{32}	Hélio Luiz Brochier, Intel ISEF Excellence in Teaching Award winner for 2003 †	MPC · 21392
21393 Kalygeringer	1998 FF_{34}	Karen Lynn Geringer, American finalist in the 2005 Intel Science Talent Search (ISTS) †	MPC · 21393
21394 Justinbecker	1998 FY_{35}	Justin Scott Becker, American finalist in the 2005 ISTS †	MPC · 21394
21395 Albertofilho	1998 FJ_{41}	Alberto Dal Molin Filho, Intel International Science and Engineering Fair (ISEF) Excellence in Teaching Award winner for 2003 †	MPC · 21395
21396 Fisher-Ives	1998 FC_{52}	Russ Fisher-Ives, Intel ISEF Excellence in Teaching Award winner for 2003 †	MPC · 21396
21397 Leontovich	1998 FJ_{54}	Alexander Leontovich, Intel ISEF Excellence in Teaching Award winner for 2003 †	MPC · 21397
21398 Zengguoshou	1998 FX_{55}	Zeng Guoshou, Intel ISEF Excellence in Teaching Award winner for 2003 †	MPC · 21398
21399 Bateman	1998 FG_{57}	Ailish Elizabeth Bateman, American finalist in the 2005 Intel Science Talent Search (ISTS) †	MPC · 21399
21400 Ahdout	1998 FM_{57}	Zimra Payvand Ahdout, American finalist in the 2006 Intel International Science and Engineering Fair (ISEF) †	MPC · 21400

== 21401–21500 ==
back to top

Named minor planet	Provisional	This minor planet was named for...	Ref; Catalog
21401 Justinkovac	1998 FC_{58}	Justin Alexander Kovac, American Intel Science Talent Search (ISTS) 2005 finalist †	MPC · 21401
21402 Shanhuang	1998 FE_{58}	Shan Yuan Huang, American ISTS 2005 finalist †	MPC · 21402
21403 Haken	1998 FN_{58}	Ian Robert Haken, American ISTS 2005 finalist †	MPC · 21403
21404 Atluri	1998 FD_{61}	Kamalakar Atluri, American finalist in the 2006 Intel International Science and Engineering Fair (ISEF) †	MPC · 21404
21405 Sagarmehta	1998 FU_{61}	Sagar Viplov Mehta, American Intel Science Talent Search (ISTS) 2005 finalist †	MPC · 21405
21406 Jimyang	1998 FZ_{63}	Jimmy Chen Yang, American ISTS 2005 finalist †	MPC · 21406
21407 Jessicabaker	1998 FL_{64}	Jessica Leann Baker, American finalist in the 2006 Intel International Science and Engineering Fair (ISEF) †	MPC · 21407
21408 Lyrahaas	1998 FZ_{64}	Lyra Creamer Haas, American Intel Science Talent Search (ISTS) 2005 finalist †	MPC · 21408
21409 Forbes	1998 FC_{65}	Michael Andrew Forbes, American ISTS 2005 finalist †	MPC · 21409
21410 Cahill	1998 FH_{65}	James Andrew Cahill, American ISTS 2005 finalist †	MPC · 21410
21411 Abifraeman	1998 FY_{66}	Abigail Ann Fraeman, American ISTS 2005 finalist †	MPC · 21411
21412 Sinchanban	1998 FJ_{67}	Sinchan Banerjee, American finalist in the 2006 Intel International Science and Engineering Fair (ISEF) · 21412	
21413 Albertsao	1998 FS_{68}	Albert Tsao, American ISTS 2005 finalist †	MPC · 21413
21414 Blumenthal	1998 FQ_{69}	Daniel Abraham Blumenthal, American finalist in the 2006 Intel International Science and Engineering Fair (ISEF) †	MPC · 21414
21415 Nicobrenner	1998 FM_{70}	Nicole Rachelle Brenner, American finalist in the 2006 Intel ISEF †	MPC · 21415
21416 Sisichen	1998 FN_{70}	Sisi Monica Chen, American Intel Science Talent Search (ISTS) 2005 finalist †	MPC · 21416
21417 Kelleyharris	1998 FF_{71}	Kelley Harris, American ISTS 2005 finalist †	MPC · 21417
21418 Bustos	1998 FY_{71}	Miguel Angel Bustos, American finalist in the 2006 Intel International Science and Engineering Fair (ISEF) †	MPC · 21418
21419 Devience	1998 FP_{72}	Stephen Jacob DeVience, American Intel Science Talent Search (ISTS) 2005 finalist †	MPC · 21419
21420 Steinicke	1998 FL_{74}	Wolfgang Steinicke, German physicist and historian of astronomy, and a core member of the International Revised NGC/IC Project.	IAU · 21420
21421 Nealwadhwa	1998 FJ_{78}	Neal Wadhwa, American ISTS 2005 finalist †	MPC · 21421
21422 Alexacarey	1998 FL_{78}	Alexa A. Carey, American finalist in the 2006 Intel International Science and Engineering Fair (ISEF) †	MPC · 21422
21423 Credo	1998 FJ_{79}	Timothy Frank Credo, American Intel Science Talent Search (ISTS) 2005 finalist †	MPC · 21423
21424 Faithchang	1998 FU_{79}	Faith Kan Chang, American finalist in the 2006 Intel International Science and Engineering Fair (ISEF) †	MPC · 21424
21425 Cordwell	1998 FR_{90}	Robert Thomas Cordwell, American Intel Science Talent Search (ISTS) 2005 finalist †	MPC · 21425
21426 Davidbauer	1998 FP_{93}	David Lawrence Vigliarolo Bauer, American ISTS 2005 finalist †	MPC · 21426
21427 Ryanharrison	1998 FK_{97}	Ryan Marques Harrison, American ISTS 2005 finalist †	MPC · 21427
21428 Junehokim	1998 FR_{103}	June-Ho Kim, American ISTS 2005 finalist †	MPC · 21428
21429 Gulati	1998 FG_{104}	Abhi Gulati, American ISTS 2005 finalist †	MPC · 21429
21430 Brubrew	1998 FG_{107}	Bruce Xiangji Brewington, American ISTS 2005 finalist †	MPC · 21430
21431 Amberhess	1998 FR_{113}	Amber Victoria Irish Hess, American ISTS 2005 finalist †	MPC · 21431
21432 Polingloh	1998 FJ_{115}	Po-Ling Loh, American ISTS 2005 finalist †	MPC · 21432
21433 Stekramer	1998 FO_{115}	Stephen Curt Kramer, American ISTS 2005 finalist †	MPC · 21433
21434 Stanchiang	1998 FG_{116}	Stanley Shang Chiang, American ISTS 2005 finalist †	MPC · 21434
21435 Aharon	1998 FH_{116}	Terri Aharon, American mentor of a finalist in the 2005 ISTS †	MPC · 21435
21436 Chaoyichi	1998 FL_{116}	Yi-Chi Chao, Taiwanese finalist in the 2006 Intel International Science and Engineering Fair (ISEF) and Seaborg Stockholm International Youth Science Seminar (SIYSS) Award recipient †	MPC · 21436
21437 Georgechen	1998 FG_{117}	George Chen, American finalist in the 2006 Intel ISEF and International Movement for Leisure in Science and Technology (MILSET) winner †	MPC · 21437
21438 Camibarnett	1998 FP_{122}	Camille Barnett, American mentor of a finalist in the 2005 Intel Science Talent Search (ISTS) †	MPC · 21438
21439 Robenzing	1998 FN_{123}	Robert Benzing, American mentor of a finalist in the 2005 ISTS †	MPC · 21439
21440 Elizacollins	1998 FB_{125}	Eliza Collins, American mentor of a finalist in the 2005 ISTS †	MPC · 21440
21441 Stevencondie	1998 FC_{144}	Steven Condie, Illinois Mathematics and Science Academy (IMSA) Edyth May Sliffe Award for Distinguished High School Mathematics Teaching winner for 2002 also mentored a finalist in the 2005 ISTS †	MPC · 21441
21445 Pegconnolly	1998 HG_{17}	Peggy Connolly, American mentor of a finalist in the 2005 ISTS †	MPC · 21445
21446 Tedflint	1998 HV_{18}	Ted Flint, American mentor of a finalist in the 2005 ISTS †	MPC · 21446
21447 Yungchieh	1998 HZ_{18}	Yung-Chieh Chen, Taiwanese finalist in the 2006 Intel International Science and Engineering Fair (ISEF) †	MPC · 21447
21448 Galindo	1998 HE_{21}	Armando Galindo, American mentor of a finalist in the 2005 Intel Science Talent Search (ISTS) †	MPC · 21448
21449 Hemmick	1998 HQ_{22}	Lucinda Hemmick, American mentor of a finalist in the 2005 ISTS †	MPC · 21449
21450 Kissel	1998 HD_{23}	Stacy Kissel, American mentor of a finalist in the 2005 ISTS †	MPC · 21450
21451 Fisher	1998 HS_{23}	Sir Ronald Fisher, English biologist and statistician	JPL · 21451
21453 Victorlevine	1998 HA_{33}	Victor Levine, American mentor of a finalist in the 2005 Intel Science Talent Search (ISTS) †	MPC · 21453
21454 Chernoby	1998 HE_{40}	Grant Fabian Chernoby, American finalist in the 2006 Intel International Science and Engineering Fair (ISEF) †	MPC · 21454
21455 Mcfarland	1998 HH_{41}	Jennifer McFarland, American mentor of a finalist in the 2005 Intel Science Talent Search (ISTS) †	MPC · 21455
21456 Myers	1998 HM_{46}	Robert Myers, American mentor of a finalist in the 2005 ISTS †	MPC · 21456
21457 Fevig	1998 HD_{51}	Ronald A. Fevig, American planetary scientist at the University of North Dakota	JPL · 21457
21458 Susank	1998 HN_{51}	Susan D. Benecchi, née Kern ("Susan K"), American postdoctoral researcher at the Space Telescope Science Institute, Baltimore	JPL · 21458
21459 Chrisrussell	1998 HS_{51}	Christopher T. Russell, American professor of geophysics and planetary physics at the University of California, Los Angeles, and principal investigator of the Dawn mission to 1 Ceres and 4 Vesta	JPL · 21459
21460 Ryozo	1998 HP_{52}	Ryozo Suzuki, Japanese amateur astronomer	JPL · 21460
21461 Alexchernyak	1998 HS_{60}	Alexander Chernyak, American finalist in the 2006 Intel International Science and Engineering Fair (ISEF) †	MPC · 21461
21462 Karenedbal	1998 HC_{78}	Karen Nedbal, American mentor of a finalist in the 2005 Intel Science Talent Search (ISTS) †	MPC · 21462
21463 Nickerson	1998 HX_{78}	Laura Nickerson, American mentor of a finalist in the 2005 ISTS †	MPC · 21463
21464 Chinaroonchai	1998 HH_{88}	Tanongsak Chinaroonchai, Thai finalist in the 2006 Intel International Science and Engineering Fair (ISEF) †	MPC · 21464
21465 Michelepatt	1998 HG_{90}	Michele Patterson, American mentor of a finalist in the 2005 Intel Science Talent Search (ISTS) †	MPC · 21465
21466 Franpelrine	1998 HZ_{91}	Frances Pelrine, American mentor of a finalist in the 2005 ISTS †	MPC · 21466
21467 Rosenstein	1998 HX_{93}	Peter Rosenstein, American mentor of a finalist in the 2005 ISTS †	MPC · 21467
21468 Saylor	1998 HD_{97}	Charlotte Saylor, American mentor of a finalist in the 2005 ISTS †	MPC · 21468
21469 Robschum	1998 HO_{97}	Robert Schumacher, American mentor of a finalist in the 2005 ISTS †	MPC · 21469
21470 Frankchuang	1998 HV_{97}	Frank Fu-Han Chuang, American finalist in the 2006 Intel International Science and Engineering Fair (ISEF) and International Movement for Leisure in Science and Technology (MILSET) winner †	MPC · 21470
21471 Pavelchvykov	1998 HA_{98}	Pavel V. Chvykov, American finalist in the 2006 Intel International Science and Engineering Fair (ISEF) †	MPC · 21471
21472 Stimson	1998 HU_{98}	George Stimson, American mentor of a finalist in the 2005 Intel Science Talent Search (ISTS) †	MPC · 21472
21473 Petesullivan	1998 HH_{99}	Peter Sullivan, American mentor of a finalist in the 2005 ISTS †	MPC · 21473
21474 Pamelatsai	1998 HO_{99}	Pamela Tsai, American mentor of a finalist in the 2005 ISTS †	MPC · 21474
21475 Jasonclain	1998 HQ_{100}	Jason Bernard Clain, American Second Place Winner at the 2006 Intel International Science and Engineering Fair (ISEF) †	MPC · 21475
21476 Petrie	1998 HW_{101}	William Flinders Petrie, British surveyor and archaeologist, father of modern archaeology	JPL · 21476
21477 Terikdaly	1998 HX_{112}	Terik Daly, American finalist in the 2006 Intel International Science and Engineering Fair (ISEF) †	MPC · 21477
21478 Maggiedelano	1998 HW_{118}	Maggie Delano, American finalist in the 2006 Intel ISEF	MPC · 21478
21479 Marymartha	1998 HN_{124}	Mary Martha Ferrari Douglas, American finalist in the 2006 Intel ISEF †	MPC · 21479
21480 Jilltucker	1998 HO_{125}	Jill Tucker, American mentor of a finalist in the 2005 Intel Science Talent Search (ISTS) †	MPC · 21480
21481 Johnwarren	1998 HP_{125}	John Warren, American mentor of a finalist in the 2005 ISTS †	MPC · 21481
21482 Patashnick	1998 HQ_{132}	Harvey Patashnick, American mentor of a finalist in the 2005 ISTS †	MPC · 21482
21483 Abdulrasool	1998 HJ_{134}	Ameen Abdulrasool, American 2005 Intel International Science and Engineering Fair (ISEF) winner, and recipient of an Intel Young Scientist Award and a Seaborg Stockholm International Youth Science Seminar (SIYSS) Award	JPL · 21483
21484 Eppard	1998 HR_{134}	Erin F. Eppard, American finalist in the 2006 Intel ISEF †	MPC · 21484
21485 Ash	1998 HV_{137}	Lesley Elizabeth Ash, American 2005 Intel ISEF winner	JPL · 21485
21488 Danyellelee	1998 HT_{150}	Danyelle Lee Evans, American finalist in the 2006 Intel ISEF †	MPC · 21488
21495 Feaga	1998 JP_{2}	Lori Michele (Lanier) Feaga, American planetary spectroscopist	JPL · 21495
21496 Lijianyang	1998 JQ_{2}	Jianyang Li, American planetary scientist at the University of Maryland	JPL · 21496
21497 Alicehine	1998 JJ_{3}	Alice Hine, American radar data analyst at the Arecibo Observatory	JPL · 21497
21498 Keenanferar	1998 KQ_{2}	Keenan Joseph Ferar, American finalist in the 2006 Intel ISEF † ‡	MPC · 21498
21499 Perillat	1998 KS_{4}	Phil Perillat, American senior software specialist at the Arecibo Observatory	JPL · 21499
21500 Vazquez	1998 KS_{6}	Angel Vasquez, American PC network specialist and telescope operator at the Arecibo Observatory	JPL · 21500

== 21501–21600 ==
back to top

Named minor planet	Provisional	This minor planet was named for...	Ref; Catalog
21501 Acevedo	1998 KC_{8}	Tony Acevedo, American multimedia graphic designer and media officer at the Arecibo Observatory	JPL · 21501
21502 Cruz	1998 KB_{9}	Jose Cruz, American operations group head and telescope operator at the Arecibo Observatory	JPL · 21502
21503 Beksha	1998 KL_{18}	Daniel B. Beksha II, American 2005 Intel International Science and Engineering Fair (ISEF) winner † ‡	MPC · 21503
21504 Caseyfreeman	1998 KS_{19}	Casey Jo Freeman, American finalist in the 2006 Intel ISEF †	MPC · 21504
21505 Bernert	1998 KG_{28}	Michael James Bernert, American second-place winner in the 2005 Intel ISEF † ‡	MPC · 21505
21506 Betsill	1998 KH_{30}	Alayna Rachelle Betsill, American second-place winner in the 2005 Intel ISEF † ‡	MPC · 21506
21507 Bhasin	1998 KZ_{30}	Jeffrey M. Bhasin, American winner in the 2005 Intel ISEF † ‡	MPC · 21507
21508 Benbrewer	1998 KU_{33}	Benjamin Wayne Brewer, American second-place winner in the 2005 Intel ISEF † ‡	MPC · 21508
21509 Lucascavin	1998 KL_{35}	Lucas James Cavin, American second-place winner in the 2005 Intel ISEF † ‡	MPC · 21509
21510 Chemnitz	1998 KF_{36}	Mario Chemnitz, German second-place winner in the 2005 Intel ISEF † ‡	MPC · 21510
21511 Chiardola	1998 KT_{36}	Hugo Gualterio Chiardola, Argentine second-place winner in the 2005 Intel ISEF † ‡	MPC · 21511
21512 Susieclary	1998 KE_{40}	Susannah Lee Clary, American second-place winner in the 2005 Intel ISEF, and recipient of the Intel Foundation Achievement Award † ‡	MPC · 21512
21513 Bethcochran	1998 KM_{46}	Elizabeth Jean Cochran, American winner in the 2005 Intel ISEF † ‡	MPC · 21513
21514 Gamalski	1998 KS_{48}	Andrew David Gamalski, American finalist in the 2006 Intel ISEF †	MPC · 21514
21515 Gavini	1998 KR_{50}	Madhavi Pulakat Gavini, American finalist in the 2006 Intel ISEF and Intel Foundation Young Scientist Award recipient †	MPC · 21515
21516 Mariagodinez	1998 KS_{51}	Maria Estela Godniez, Mexican finalist in the 2006 Intel ISEF †	MPC · 21516
21517 Dobi	1998 KS_{52}	Kledin Dobi, American winner in the 2005 Intel ISEF † ‡	MPC · 21517
21518 Maysunhasan	1998 KO_{53}	Maysun Mazhar Hasan, American finalist in the 2006 Intel ISEF †	MPC · 21518
21519 Josephhenry	1998 KR_{54}	Joseph Kent Henry, American finalist in the 2006 Intel ISEF †	MPC · 21519
21520 Dianaeheart	1998 KR_{55}	Diana Lynn Eheart, American second-place winner in the 2005 Intel ISEF † ‡	MPC · 21520
21521 Hippalgaonkar	1998 KU_{55}	Varun Rajendra Hippalgaonkar, American finalist in the 2006 Intel ISEF †	MPC · 21521
21522 Entwisle	1998 MX_{11}	Richard William Entwisle, British winner in the 2005 Intel ISEF † ‡	MPC · 21522
21523 GONG	1998 MW_{15}	National Solar Observatory's Global Oscillation Network Group †	MPC · 21523
21526 Mirano	1998 MS_{24}	Mirano Silvestri, Italian amateur astronomer †	MPC · 21526
21527 Horton	1998 MV_{27}	Douglas Ray Horton, American finalist in the 2006 Intel International Science and Engineering Fair (ISEF) †	MPC · 21527
21528 Chrisfaust	1998 MU_{33}	Christina Lynn Faust, American winner in the 2005 Intel ISEF † ‡	MPC · 21528
21529 Johnjames	1998 MF_{37}	John James Hutchison, American finalist in the 2006 Intel ISEF †	MPC · 21529
21530 Despiau	1998 MB_{38}	Norberto Despiau, American staff technician and telescope operator at the Arecibo Observatory	JPL · 21530
21531 Billcollin	1998 OS	Bill Collin, contributor to the design and manufacture of the Auxiliary Telescope System of the European Southern Observatory's Very Large Telescope	JPL · 21531
21537 Fréchet	1998 PQ	Maurice René Fréchet, French mathematician	JPL · 21537
21539 Josefhlávka	1998 QO_{4}	Josef Hlávka, Czech architect and philanthropist, founder of the Czech Academy of Science and Arts (1891–1952)	JPL · 21539
21540 Itthipanyanan	1998 QE_{11}	Suksun Itthipanyanan, Thai finalist in the 2006 Intel International Science and Engineering Fair (ISEF) †	MPC · 21540
21541 Friskop	1998 QP_{16}	Andrew John Friskop, American winner in the 2005 Intel ISEF † ‡	MPC · 21541
21542 Kennajeannet	1998 QA_{22}	Kennan L. Jeannet, American finalist in the 2006 Intel ISEF †	MPC · 21542
21543 Jessop	1998 QQ_{24}	Forrest Connell Jessop, American finalist in the 2006 Intel ISEF †	MPC · 21543
21544 Hermainkhan	1998 QL_{33}	Hermain Suhail Khan, American finalist in the 2006 Intel ISEF †	MPC · 21544
21545 Koirala	1998 QO_{33}	Pratistha Koirala, American finalist in the 2006 Intel ISEF †	MPC · 21545
21546 Konermann	1998 QH_{34}	Silvana Konermann, German finalist in the 2006 Intel ISEF †	MPC · 21546
21547 Kottapalli	1998 QK_{38}	Anjaney Pramod Kottapalli, American finalist in the 2006 Intel ISEF †	MPC · 21547
21548 Briekugler	1998 QX_{38}	Brienne Ashley Kugler, American finalist in the 2006 Intel ISEF †	MPC · 21548
21549 Carolinelang	1998 QJ_{44}	Caroline Janet Lang, American finalist in the 2006 Intel ISEF †	MPC · 21549
21550 Laviolette	1998 QS_{44}	Jessica Lynn Laviolette, American finalist in the 2006 Intel ISEF †	MPC · 21550
21551 Geyang	1998 QH_{45}	Ge Yang, Chinese second-place winner in the 2005 Intel ISEF † ‡	MPC · 21551
21552 Richardlee	1998 QC_{52}	Richard C. Lee, American finalist in the 2006 Intel ISEF †	MPC · 21552
21553 Monchicourt	1998 QT_{55}	Marie Odile Monchicourt, French science journalist, producer and host on Radio-France and France television ‡	MPC · 21553
21554 Leechaohsi	1998 QR_{69}	Chao-Hsi Lee, Taiwanese finalist in the 2006 Intel ISEF †	MPC · 21554
21555 Levary	1998 QF_{70}	David Andrew Levary, American finalist in the 2006 Intel ISEF †	MPC · 21555
21556 Christineli	1998 QE_{71}	Christine Weizer Li, American finalist in the 2006 Intel ISEF †	MPC · 21556
21557 Daniellitt	1998 QE_{73}	Daniel Abraham Litt, American finalist in the 2006 Intel ISEF †	MPC · 21557
21558 Alisonliu	1998 QW_{77}	Alison W. Liu, American finalist in the 2006 Intel ISEF †	MPC · 21558
21559 Jingyuanluo	1998 QE_{78}	Jingyuan Luo, American finalist in the 2006 Intel ISEF †	MPC · 21559
21560 Analyons	1998 QC_{91}	Ana Marie Lyons, American finalist in the 2006 Intel ISEF †	MPC · 21560
21561 Masterman	1998 QR_{93}	Mary Masterman, American finalist in the 2006 Intel ISEF †	MPC · 21561
21562 Chrismessick	1998 QZ_{94}	Christopher D. Messick, American finalist in the 2006 Intel ISEF †	MPC · 21562
21563 Chetgervais	1998 QW_{95}	Chetley L. C. Gervais, Canadian winner in the 2005 Intel ISEF † ‡	MPC · 21563
21564 Widmanstätten	1998 QQ_{101}	Count Alois von Widmanstätten, 18th/19th-century Austrian chemist, who discovered the Widmanstätten patterns peculiar to iron meteorites	JPL · 21564
21568 Evanmorikawa	1998 RM_{3}	Evan Takashi Morikawa, American finalist in the 2006 Intel ISEF †	MPC · 21568
21570 Muralidhar	1998 RK_{33}	Vinayak Muralidhar, American finalist in the 2006 Intel ISEF †	MPC · 21570
21571 Naegeli	1998 RD_{51}	Kaleb Markus Naegeli, American finalist in the 2006 Intel ISEF †	MPC · 21571
21572 Nguyen-McCarty	1998 RQ_{52}	Michelle Andrea Nguyen-McCarty, American finalist in the 2006 Intel ISEF †	MPC · 21572
21574 Ouzan	1998 RZ_{71}	Raphael Ouzan, Israeli finalist in the 2006 Intel ISEF †	MPC · 21574
21575 Padmanabhan	1998 RB_{80}	Hamsa Padmanabhan, Indian finalist in the 2006 Intel ISEF †	MPC · 21575
21576 McGivney	1998 SH_{4}	Michael J. McGivney, 19th-century parish priest of St. Mary's Church in New Haven, Connecticut, founder of the Knights of Columbus	JPL · 21576
21577 Negron	1998 SU_{24}	Victor Negron, American electronics technician and transmitter operator at the Arecibo Observatory	JPL · 21577
21578 Davidgillette	1998 SN_{27}	David D. Gillette (1946–2025), American paleontologist.	JPL · 21578
21580 Portalatin	1998 SY_{57}	Wilfredo Portalatin, American staff technician and telescope operator at the Arecibo Observatory	JPL · 21580
21581 Ernestoruiz	1998 SD_{58}	Ernesto Ruiz, American electronics technician and telescope operator at the Arecibo Observatory	JPL · 21581
21582 Arunvenkataraman	1998 SE_{58}	Arun Venkataraman, American head of the computer department of the Arecibo Observatory	JPL · 21582
21583 Caropietsch	1998 SQ_{108}	Caroline Elizabeth Pietsch, American finalist in the 2006 Intel ISEF †	MPC · 21583
21584 Polepeddi	1998 SK_{121}	Lalith Kumar Polepeddi, American finalist in the 2006 Intel ISEF †	MPC · 21584
21585 Polmear	1998 SX_{126}	Michael McCord Polmear, American finalist in the 2006 Intel ISEF †	MPC · 21585
21586 Pourkaviani	1998 SU_{129}	Shahin Pourkaviani, American finalist in the 2006 Intel ISEF †	MPC · 21586
21587 Christopynn	1998 SE_{132}	Christopher Donald Pynn, American finalist in the 2006 Intel ISEF †	MPC · 21587
21588 Gianelli	1998 SK_{157}	Gabrielle Alyce Gianelli, American winner in the 2005 Intel ISEF and recipient of the Intel Young Scientist Award † ‡	MPC · 21588
21589 Rafes	1998 SR_{162}	Courtney Anne Rafes, American finalist in the 2006 Intel ISEF †	MPC · 21589

== 21601–21700 ==
back to top

Named minor planet	Provisional	This minor planet was named for...	Ref; Catalog
21601 Aias	1998 XO_{89}	Aias, also known as Ajax the Lesser, leader of the Locrians who fought with the Acheans.	MPC · 21601
21602 Ialmenus	1998 YW_{1}	Ialmenus, son of Ares and Astyoche, one of the Achaean leaders, one of those who entered Troy in the Wooden Horse, an Argonaut, and a suitor of Helen † ‡	MPC · 21602
21605 Reynoso	1999 CL_{81}	Jeremy Rosendo Reynoso, American finalist in the 2006 Intel ISEF	MPC · 21605
21607 Robel	1999 GG_{34}	Alexander Abram Robel, American finalist in the 2006 Intel ISEF	MPC · 21607
21608 Gloyna	1999 GQ_{35}	Tara Ellen Gloyna, American second-place winner in the 2005 Intel ISEF	MPC · 21608
21609 Williamcaleb	1999 JQ_{41}	William Caleb Rodgers, American finalist in the 2006 Intel ISEF	MPC · 21609
21610 Rosengard	1999 JE_{48}	Jamie Erin Rosengard, American finalist in the 2006 Intel ISEF	MPC · 21610
21611 Rosoff	1999 JV_{50}	Matthew Scott Rosoff, American finalist in the 2006 Intel ISEF	MPC · 21611
21612 Chelsagloria	1999 JS_{57}	Chelsea Gloria Gordon, American winner in the 2005 Intel ISEF, and recipient of the Intel Foundation Achievement Award † ‡	MPC · 21612
21613 Schlecht	1999 JF_{68}	Alissa Raenelle Schlecht, American finalist in the 2006 Intel ISEF	MPC · 21613
21614 Grochowski	1999 JW_{75}	Julia Caroline Grochowski, Canadian second-place winner in the 2005 Intel ISEF † ‡	MPC · 21614
21615 Guardamano	1999 JQ_{76}	Andrew Lacson Guardamano, Canadian second-place winner in the 2005 Intel ISEF † ‡	MPC · 21615
21616 Guhagilford	1999 JQ_{82}	Tristan Guha-Gilford, American second-place winner in the 2005 Intel ISEF † ‡	MPC · 21616
21617 Johnhagen	1999 JO_{119}	John Thomas Hagen, American second-place winner in the 2005 Intel ISEF † ‡	MPC · 21617
21618 Sheikh	1999 JT_{122}	Hamza Sheikh, Pakistani finalist in the 2006 Intel ISEF	MPC · 21618
21619 Johnshopkins	1999 JN_{136}	Johns Hopkins, 19th-century American entrepreneur and philanthropist of Baltimore, Maryland, best known for his creation of Johns Hopkins University and its affiliated institutions, including the Applied Physics Laboratory	JPL · 21619
21621 Sherman	1999 KR_{4}	Eric Alan Sherman, American finalist in the 2006 Intel ISEF	MPC · 21621
21622 Victorshia	1999 LV_{22}	Victor Andrew Shia, American finalist in the 2006 Intel ISEF and International Movement for Leisure in Science and Technology (MILSET) winner	MPC · 21622
21623 Albertshieh	1999 LS_{24}	Albert David Shieh, American finalist in the 2006 Intel ISEF	MPC · 21623
21625 Seira	1999 NN_{2}	Seira Shimoyama, Japanese finalist in the 2006 Intel ISEF	MPC · 21625
21626 Matthewhall	1999 NP_{2}	Matthew J. Hall, American winner in the 2005 Intel ISEF	MPC · 21626
21627 Sillis	1999 NZ_{3}	Arnaud Georges Sillis, American finalist in the 2006 Intel ISEF	MPC · 21627
21628 Lucashof	1999 ND_{4}	Lucas Hudson Hofmeister, American second-place winner in the 2005 Intel ISEF † ‡	MPC · 21628
21629 Siperstein	1999 NT_{8}	Brian Furness Siperstein, American finalist in the 2006 Intel ISEF	MPC · 21629
21630 Wootensmith	1999 NM_{9}	Lauren Wooten Smith, American finalist in the 2006 Intel ISEF	MPC · 21630
21631 Stephenhonan	1999 NU_{10}	Stephen Goodwin Honan, American winner in the 2005 Intel ISEF † ‡	MPC · 21631
21632 Suwanasri	1999 NR_{11}	Krongrath Suwanasri, Thai finalist in the 2006 Intel ISEF	MPC · 21632
21633 Hsingpenyuan	1999 NW_{11}	Pen-Yuan Hsing, Taiwanese winner in the 2005 Intel ISEF, and recipient of the EU Contest for Young Scientists Award † ‡	MPC · 21633
21634 Huangweikang	1999 NB_{18}	Huang Wei-Kang, Taiwanese winner in the 2005 Intel ISEF, and recipient of the EU Contest for Young Scientists Award † ‡	MPC · 21634
21635 Micahtoll	1999 NU_{19}	Micah Lathaniel Toll, American finalist in the 2006 Intel ISEF	MPC · 21635
21636 Huertas	1999 NS_{34}	Johiry Huertas, Puerto Rican second-place winner in the 2005 Intel ISEF † ‡	MPC · 21636
21637 Ninahuffman	1999 NH_{36}	Nina Maria Huffman, American second-place winner in the 2005 Intel ISEF † ‡	MPC · 21637
21638 Nicjachowski	1999 NA_{39}	Nicholas Robert Apau Jachowski, American winner in the 2005 Intel ISEF † ‡	MPC · 21638
21639 Davidkaufman	1999 ND_{39}	David Brooks Kaufman, American second-place winner in the 2005 Intel ISEF † ‡	MPC · 21639
21640 Petekirkland	1999 NX_{39}	Peter Jonathan Kirkland, Northern Irish winner in the 2005 Intel ISEF † ‡	MPC · 21640
21641 Tiffanyko	1999 NC_{40}	Tiffany Sain-Yee Ko, American winner in the 2005 Intel ISEF † ‡	MPC · 21641
21642 Kominers	1999 NH_{41}	Scott Duke Kominers, American second-place winner in the 2005 Intel ISEF † ‡	MPC · 21642
21643 Kornev	1999 NJ_{42}	Aleksey Borisovich Kornev, Russian second-place winner in the 2005 Intel ISEF † ‡	MPC · 21643
21644 Vinay	1999 NA_{50}	Vinay Tripuraneni, American finalist in the 2006 Intel ISEF	MPC · 21644
21645 Chentsaiwei	1999 NZ_{50}	Chen Wei Tsai, Taiwanese finalist in the 2006 Intel ISEF	MPC · 21645
21646 Joshuaturner	1999 NK_{53}	Joshua Robert Turner, American finalist in the 2006 Intel ISEF	MPC · 21646
21647 Carlturner	1999 NE_{54}	Carl Anthony Turner, American finalist in the 2006 Intel ISEF	MPC · 21647
21648 Gravanschaik	1999 NB_{57}	Graham William Wakefield Van Schaik, American finalist in the 2006 Intel ISEF	MPC · 21648
21649 Vardhana	1999 NQ_{59}	Anarghya A. Vardhana, American finalist in the 2006 Intel ISEF	MPC · 21649
21650 Tilgner	1999 OB_{1}	Bruno Tilgner, of the European Space Agency, who helped the discoverer in identifying artificial satellites †	MPC · 21650
21651 Mission Valley	1999 OF_{1}	Mission Valley High School, on the grounds of which is situated Farpoint Observatory	JPL · 21651
21652 Vasishtha	1999 OQ_{2}	Dhruv Vasishtha, American finalist in the 2006 Intel ISEF	MPC · 21652
21653 Davidwang	1999 OH_{3}	David Jueyu Wang, Canadian finalist in the 2006 Intel ISEF	MPC · 21653
21654 Telmo	1999 PZ	Telmo Fernández Castro, Director of the Madrid Planetarium; he holds a doctorate in astrophysics from the Universidad Complutense de Madrid, with expertise in symbiotic binary stars.	IAU · 21654
21655 Niklauswirth	1999 PC_{1}	Niklaus Wirth (1934-2024), Swiss computer scientist	JPL · 21655
21656 Knuth	1999 PX_{1}	Donald Knuth (born 1938), American computer scientist	JPL · 21656
21657 Alinecarter	1999 PZ_{1}	Aline Badger Carter (1892-1972), Poet Laureate of Texas from 1947 to 1949, human rights activist, and astronomy teacher	IAU · 21657
21659 Fredholm	1999 PR_{3}	Erik Ivar Fredholm (1866–1927), Swedish mathematician	JPL · 21659
21660 Velenia	1999 QZ_{1}	Miroslav Velen (born 1972), who developed software for the reduction of photometric and astrometric data at Ondřejov Observatory †	MPC · 21660
21661 Olgagermani	1999 RA	Olga Germani (1900–1983), Italian poet	JPL · 21661
21662 Benigni	1999 RC	Roberto Benigni (born 1952), Italian actor, comedian, screenwriter, and film director	JPL · 21662
21663 Banat	1999 RM	Banat, a region in central Europe lying between Transylvania and Walachia, and the rivers Tisza, Mureş, and Danube, home of the Danube Swabians †	MPC · 21663
21664 Konradzuse	1999 RG_{1}	Konrad Zuse, German engineer and computer pioneer	JPL · 21664
21665 Frege	1999 RR_{1}	Friedrich Ludwig Gottlob Frege, German mathematician	JPL · 21665
21670 Kuan	1999 RD_{11}	Aaron Tzeyang Kuan, American second-place winner in the 2005 Intel International Science and Engineering Fair (ISEF) † ‡	MPC · 21670
21671 Warrener	1999 RP_{12}	Stephen Gerald Warrener, American finalist in the 2006 Intel ISEF	MPC · 21671
21672 Laichunju	1999 RK_{14}	Lai Chun-Ju, Chinese second-place winner in the 2005 Intel ISEF † ‡	MPC · 21672
21673 Leatherman	1999 RL_{15}	Amanda Kay Leatherman, American second-place winner in the 2005 Intel ISEF † ‡	MPC · 21673
21674 Renaldowebb	1999 RG_{18}	Renaldo Michael Webb, American finalist in the 2006 Intel ISEF	MPC · 21674
21675 Kaitlinmaria	1999 RM_{22}	Kaitlin Maria Luther, American second-place winner in the 2005 Intel ISEF † ‡	MPC · 21675
21676 Maureenanne	1999 RB_{23}	Maureen Anne Williams, American finalist in the 2006 Intel ISEF	MPC · 21676
21677 Tylerlyon	1999 RO_{23}	Tyler Glen Lyon, American second-place winner in the 2005 Intel ISEF † ‡	MPC · 21677
21678 Lindner	1999 RK_{27}	Klaus Lindner (born 1935), German school teacher of astronomy and author	JPL · 21678
21679 Bettypalermiti	1999 RD_{28}	Betty M. Palermiti, American dental hygienist and optical specialist, Pro Class drag-racing driver, and wife of amateur astronomer Michael Palermiti of Palermiti Observatory, Jupiter, Florida	JPL · 21679
21680 Richardschwartz	1999 RS_{31}	Richard K. Schwartz (1933–1998), American amateur astronomer and pioneer of the CCD revolution †	MPC · 21680
21682 Peštafrantišek	1999 RT_{32}	František Pešta (1905–1982), Czech founder of the popular observatory (Hvězdárna Františka Pešty) in Sezimovo Ústí †	MPC · 21682
21683 Segal	1999 RL_{33}	Bruce A. Segal (born 1959), American and amateur astronomer and discoverer of minor planets. He is an eye physician and surgeon by profession.	JPL · 21683
21684 Alinafiocca	1999 RR_{33}	Alina Fiocca, young daughter of close friends of the discoverers † ‡	MPC · 21684
21685 Francomallia	1999 RL_{35}	Franco Mallia (born 1961), Italian amateur astronomer and discoverer of minor planets	JPL · 21685
21686 Koschny	1999 RB_{36}	Detlef Koschny (born 1962), German aerospace engineer and amateur astronomer, Planetary Science Operations Manager at ESA's Planetary Missions † ‡	MPC · 21686
21687 Filopanti	1999 RB_{37}	Quirico Filopanti, pseudonym of Giuseppe Barilli, Italian patriot, author, and professor of mathematics at Bologna University	JPL · 21687
21694 Allisowilson	1999 RL_{48}	Allison Ruth Wilson, American finalist in the 2006 Intel International Science and Engineering Fair (ISEF)	MPC · 21694
21695 Hannahwolf	1999 RG_{49}	Hannah Louise Wolf, American finalist in the 2006 Intel ISEF and Intel Foundation Young Scientist Award recipient	MPC · 21695
21696 Ermalmquist	1999 RC_{52}	Eric Ragnarson Malmquist, American second-place winner in the 2005 Intel ISEF † ‡	MPC · 21696
21697 Mascharak	1999 RW_{54}	Smita Mascharak, American second-place winner in the 2005 Intel ISEF † ‡	MPC · 21697
21698 McCarron	1999 RD_{56}	Tara Anne McCarron, American second-place winner in the 2005 Intel ISEF † ‡	MPC · 21698
21699 Wolpert	1999 RE_{64}	Maya Nina Wolpert, American winner in the 2006 Intel ISEF	MPC · 21699
21700 Caseynicole	1999 RD_{72}	Casey Nicole McDonald, American second-place winner in the 2005 Intel ISEF † ‡	MPC · 21700

== 21701–21800 ==
back to top

Named minor planet	Provisional	This minor planet was named for...	Ref; Catalog
21701 Gabemendoza	1999 RP_{72}	Gabriel Joel Mendoza, American second-place winner in the 2005 Intel International Science and Engineering Fair (ISEF) †	JPL · 21701
21702 Prisymendoza	1999 RA_{73}	Priscilla Yvette Mendoza, American second-place winner in the 2005 Intel ISEF †	JPL · 21702
21703 Shravanimikk	1999 RM_{73}	Shravani Mikkilineni, American second-place winner in the 2005 Intel ISEF †	JPL · 21703
21704 Mikkilineni	1999 RD_{85}	Sohan Venkat Mikkilineni, American second-place winner in the 2005 Intel ISEF †	JPL · 21704
21705 Subinmin	1999 RA_{86}	Su Bin Min, South Korean second-place winner in the 2005 Intel ISEF †	JPL · 21705
21706 Robminehart	1999 RM_{87}	Robert Francis Minehart III, American second-place winner in the 2005 Intel ISEF †	JPL · 21706
21707 Johnmoore	1999 RY_{88}	John Pease Moore IV, American second-place winner in the 2005 Intel ISEF, and recipient of the Intel Foundation Achievement Award †	JPL · 21707
21708 Mulhall	1999 RV_{90}	Michael Mulhall, Irish winner in the 2005 Intel ISEF †	JPL · 21708
21709 Sethmurray	1999 RK_{92}	Seth Asa Murray, American second-place winner in the 2005 Intel ISEF †	JPL · 21709
21710 Nijhawan	1999 RS_{92}	Sonia Nijhawan, American second-place winner in the 2005 Intel ISEF †	JPL · 21710
21711 Wilfredwong	1999 RE_{95}	Wilfred Chung-Him Wong, American finalist in the 2006 Intel ISEF †	JPL · 21711
21712 Obaid	1999 RL_{96}	Sami Obaid, Canadian second-place winner in the 2005 Intel ISEF †	JPL · 21712
21713 Michaelolson	1999 RW_{97}	Michael R. Olson, American winner in the 2005 Intel ISEF, and recipient of the MILSET Expo-Science Award †	JPL · 21713
21714 Geoffreywoo	1999 RX_{109}	Geoffrey Hubert Woo, American finalist in the 2006 Intel ISEF †	JPL · 21714
21715 Palaniappan	1999 RA_{110}	Anand M. Palaniappan, American second-place winner in the 2005 Intel ISEF, and recipient of the Intel Foundation Achievement Award †	JPL · 21715
21716 Panchamia	1999 RX_{113}	Rohan Kirit Panchamia, American second-place winner in the 2005 Intel ISEF †	JPL · 21716
21717 Pang	1999 RO_{114}	Genevieve C. Pang, American second-place winner in the 2005 Intel ISEF †	JPL · 21717
21718 Cheonghapark	1999 RO_{115}	Cheong Ha Park, South Korean second-place winner in the 2005 Intel ISEF †	JPL · 21718
21719 Pasricha	1999 RR_{115}	Trisha Satya Pasricha, American second-place winner in the 2005 Intel ISEF †	JPL · 21719
21720 Pilishvili	1999 RQ_{119}	Anna Pilishvili, American second-place winner in the 2005 Intel ISEF †	JPL · 21720
21721 Feiniqu	1999 RY_{119}	Feini Qu, American winner in the 2005 Intel ISEF, and recipient of the Intel Foundation Achievement Award †	JPL · 21721
21722 Rambhia	1999 RX_{120}	Suraj Hitendra Rambhia, American winner in the 2005 Intel ISEF †	JPL · 21722
21723 Yinyinwu	1999 RT_{128}	Yin Yin Wu, American finalist in the 2006 Intel ISEF †	JPL · 21723
21724 Ratai	1999 RA_{132}	Daniel Ratai, Hungarian winner in the 2005 Intel ISEF, and recipient of the Intel Foundation Achievement Award and the Seaborg SIYSS Award †	JPL · 21724
21725 Zhongyuechen	1999 RB_{132}	Zhong Yuechen (born 1988) was awarded second place in the 2006 Intel International Science and Engineering Fair for her botany project. She attends the Beijing No.101 Middle School, Beijing, China.	JPL · 21725
21726 Rezvanian	1999 RB_{134}	Jason Hamid Rezvanian, American second-place winner in the 2005 Intel ISEF †	JPL · 21726
21727 Rhines	1999 RY_{135}	Allison Shelton Rhines, American second-place winner in the 2005 Intel ISEF †	JPL · 21727
21728 Zhuzhirui	1999 RH_{136}	Zhirui Zhu, Chinese finalist in the 2006 Intel ISEF †	JPL · 21728
21729 Kimrichards	1999 RE_{137}	Kimberly Skye Richards, Canadian second-place winner in the 2005 Intel ISEF †	JPL · 21729
21730 Ignaciorod	1999 RG_{138}	Ignacio Gabriel Rodriguez, Argentine second-place winner in the 2005 Intel ISEF †	JPL · 21730
21731 Zhuruochen	1999 RT_{142}	RuoChen Zhu, Chinese finalist in the 2006 Intel ISEF †	JPL · 21731
21732 Rumery	1999 RW_{142}	Rhett Lee Rumery, American second-place winner in the 2005 Intel ISEF †	JPL · 21732
21733 Schlottmann	1999 RX_{145}	Chad Avery Schlottmann, American winner in the 2005 Intel ISEF, and recipient of the MILSET Expo-Science Award †	MPC · 21733
21735 Nissaschmidt	1999 RV_{146}	Nissa Leigh Schmidt, American second-place winner in the 2005 Intel ISEF †	JPL · 21735
21736 Samaschneid	1999 RW_{149}	Samantha Leigh Schneider, American second-place winner in the 2005 Intel ISEF †	JPL · 21736
21737 Stephenshulz	1999 RV_{151}	Stephen Schulz, German winner in the 2005 Intel ISEF, and recipient of the Intel Foundation Achievement Award, the Intel Young Scientist Award, and the Seaborg SIYSS Award †	MPC · 21737
21738 Schwank	1999 RB_{153}	Benjamin Albert Schwank was awarded first place and Best in Category in the 2005 Intel ISEF †	JPL · 21738
21739 Annekeschwob	1999 RN_{157}	Anneke Ellen Schwob, American second-place winner in the 2005 Intel ISEF †	JPL · 21739
21742 Rachaelscott	1999 RU_{163}	Rachael Ann Scott, American winner in the 2005 Intel ISEF †	JPL · 21742
21743 Michaelsegal	1999 RB_{164}	Michael Segal, American winner in the 2005 Intel ISEF †	JPL · 21743
21744 Meliselinger	1999 RF_{168}	Melissa C. Selinger, American second-place winner in the 2005 Intel ISEF †	JPL · 21744
21745 Shadfan	1999 RX_{168}	Basil Harbi Shadfan, American second-place winner in the 2005 Intel ISEF †	JPL · 21745
21746 Carrieshaw	1999 RZ_{169}	Carrie Elizabeth Shaw, American second-place winner in the 2005 Intel ISEF †	JPL · 21746
21747 Justsolomon	1999 RD_{170}	Justin Moore Solomon, American winner in the 2005 Intel ISEF †	JPL · 21747
21748 Srinivasan	1999 RH_{170}	Harish Mayur Srinivasan, American second-place winner in the 2005 Intel ISEF †	JPL · 21748
21750 Tartakahashi	1999 RG_{173}	Taryn Mahealani Takahashi, American second-place winner in the 2005 Intel ISEF †	JPL · 21750
21751 Jennytaylor	1999 RT_{176}	Jennifer Ann Taylor, American second-place winner in the 2005 Intel ISEF †	JPL · 21751
21752 Johnthurmon	1999 RC_{179}	John Thomas Thurmon, American second-place winner in the 2005 Intel ISEF †	JPL · 21752
21753 Trudel	1999 RJ_{180}	Thomas Andrew Trudel, American second-place winner in the 2005 Intel ISEF †	JPL · 21753
21754 Tvaruzkova	1999 RZ_{183}	Zuzana Tvaruzkova, Czech winner in the 2005 Intel ISEF †	JPL · 21754
21758 Adrianveres	1999 RT_{196}	Adrian Veres, Romanian-born Canadian winner in the 2005 Intel ISEF †	JPL · 21758
21770 Wangyiran	1999 RF_{211}	Wang YiRan, Chinese second-place winner in the 2005 Intel ISEF †	JPL · 21770
21774 O'Brien	1999 RR_{217}	David P. O'Brien (born 1976), an American planetary scientist at the Planetary Science Institute, Tucson, whose research includes the collisional evolution of the asteroid belt, leaving craters on main-belt asteroids such as 951 Gaspra. He also investigates the shaping of the asteroid belt during the accretion of the primordial protoplanetary disk.	JPL · 21774
21775 Tsiganis	1999 RC_{221}	Kleomenis Tsiganis (born 1974), a Greek planetary scientist at the University of Thessaloniki, whose research includes the chaotic diffusion of minor planets and the impact of the Late Heavy Bombardment on the structure of the asteroid belt and the Trojan camps.	JPL · 21775
21776 Kryszczyńska	1999 RE_{221}	Agnieszka Kryszczyńska (born 1965) is a Polish planetary scientist at Adam Mickiewicz University, Poznań. Using photometry, she has studied the physical properties of minor planets. She discovered the binary nature of (809) Lundia and maintains a database of the pole coordinates and shapes of minor planets.	JPL · 21776
21778 Andrewarren	1999 RF_{225}	Andrew David Warren, American second-place winner in the 2005 Intel ISEF †	JPL · 21778
21782 Davemcdonald	1999 RV_{239}	David McDonald (born 1964), Irish amateur astronomer, discoverer of minor planets and astronomy promoter	JPL · 21782
21785 Méchain	1999 SS_{2}	Pierre Méchain (1744–1804), a French astronomer and discoverer of many comets and deep-sky objects. A colleague and friend of Messier, he contributed much to Messier's catalogue of nebulae.	JPL · 21785
21789 Frankwasser	1999 SH_{7}	Francis Wasser, Irish winner in the 2005 Intel International Science and Engineering Fair (ISEF) †	JPL · 21789
21791 Mattweegman	1999 SR_{7}	Matt Moraco Weegman, American second-place winner in the 2005 Intel ISEF †	JPL · 21791
21795 Masi	1999 SN_{9}	Gianluca Masi (born 1972), Italian astrophysicist and "amateur" astronomer, as well as a science communicator	JPL · 21795
21798 Mitchweegman	1999 SZ_{16}	Mitch Dale Weegman, American second-place winner in the 2005 Intel International Science and Engineering Fair (ISEF) †	JPL · 21798
21799 Ciociaria	1999 TP	Ciociaria, region of Italy comprising the southern Latium, southern Abruzzo and Molise, which takes its name from the ciocia, the ancient footwear of its early inhabitants	JPL · 21799

== 21801–21900 ==
back to top

Named minor planet	Provisional	This minor planet was named for...	Ref; Catalog
21801 Ančerl	1999 TW_{3}	Karel Ančerl (1908–1973), chief conductor of the Czech Philharmonic Orchestra	MPC · 21801
21802 Svoreň	1999 TE_{6}	Ján Svoreň (born 1949), Slovak astronomer	MPC · 21802
21804 Václavneumann	1999 TC_{8}	Václav Neumann (1920–1995), Czech violinist and viola player, chief conductor of the Czech Philharmonic Orchestra	MPC · 21804
21811 Burroughs	1999 TR_{20}	Edgar Rice Burroughs (1875–1950), American author, best known for Tarzan of the Apes	JPL · 21811
21813 Danwinegar	1999 TK_{25}	Daniel Rees Winegar, American second-place winner in the 2005 Intel International Science and Engineering Fair (ISEF) †	MPC · 21813
21814 Shanawolff	1999 TQ_{27}	Shana Marie Wolff, American winner in the 2005 Intel ISEF †	MPC · 21814
21815 Fanyang	1999 TF_{29}	Fan Yang, American second-place winner in the 2005 Intel ISEF †	MPC · 21815
21817 Yingling	1999 TG_{32}	Chelsey Ann Yingling, American second-place winner in the 2005 Intel ISEF †	MPC · 21817
21818 Yurkanin	1999 TJ_{32}	Alana Marie Yurkanin, American second-place winner in the 2005 Intel ISEF †	MPC · 21818
21821 Billryan	1999 TN_{36}	William H. Ryan (born 1962), American astrophysicist at the New Mexico Institute of Mining and Technology's Magdalena Ridge Observatory (MRO), discoverer of the first binarity of a vestoid, 3782 Celle. His wife and collaborator at MRO is Eileen V. Ryan (Src)	JPL · 21821
21822 Degiorgi	1999 TX_{36}	Ennio De Giorgi (1928–1996), Italian mathematician	JPL · 21822
21825 Zhangyizhong	1999 TR_{88}	Zhang Yizhong, Chinese second-place winner in the 2005 Intel ISEF †	MPC · 21825
21826 Youjiazhong	1999 TJ_{91}	YouJia Zhong, Singaporean second-place winner in the 2005 Intel ISEF †	MPC · 21826
21827 Chingzhu	1999 TS_{91}	Ching Zhu, American second-place winner in the 2005 Intel ISEF †	MPC · 21827
21829 Kaylacornale	1999 TZ_{92}	Kayla Marie Cornale, Canadian third-place winner in the 2005 Intel ISEF, and recipient of the Intel Foundation Achievement Award †	MPC · 21829
21840 Ghoshchoudhury	1999 TT_{101}	Triparna Ghosh-Choudhury, American third-place winner in the 2005 Intel ISEF, and recipient of the Intel Foundation Achievement Award †	MPC · 21840
21846 Wojakowski	1999 TT_{114}	Maria Malgorzata Wojakowski, American fourth-place winner in the 2005 Intel ISEF, and recipient of the Intel Foundation Achievement Award †	MPC · 21846
21850 Abshir	1999 TF_{142}	Iftin Mohamed Abshir, American finalist in the 2005 Discovery Channel Young Scientist Challenge (DCYSC) †	MPC · 21850
21852 Bolander	1999 TR_{143}	John Anthony Bolander, American finalist in the 2005 DCYSC †	MPC · 21852
21853 Kelseykay	1999 TU_{146}	Kelsey Kay Burnham, American finalist in the 2005 DCYSC †	MPC · 21853
21854 Brendandwyer	1999 TJ_{147}	Brendan John Dwyer, American finalist in the 2005 DCYSC †	MPC · 21854
21856 Heathermaria	1999 TR_{150}	Heather Maria Foster, American finalist in the 2005 DCYSC †	MPC · 21856
21858 Gosal	1999 TY_{155}	Anudeep D. Gosal, American finalist in the 2005 DCYSC †	MPC · 21858
21860 Joannaguy	1999 TX_{180}	Joanna Christine Guy, American finalist in the 2005 DCYSC †	MPC · 21860
21861 Maryhedberg	1999 TU_{189}	Mary Lucia Hedberg, American finalist in the 2005 DCYSC †	MPC · 21861
21862 Joshuajones	1999 TV_{189}	Joshua Steven Jones, American finalist in the 2005 DCYSC †	MPC · 21862
21873 Jindřichůvhradec	1999 UU_{3}	The Czech town of Jindřichův Hradec, location of the popular observatory named after František Nušl	MPC · 21873
21887 Dipippo	1999 UH_{42}	Simonetta Di Pippo (born 1959), Italian astrophysicist and science coordinator for the Italian Space Agency	JPL · 21887
21888 Ďurech	1999 UL_{44}	Josef Ďurech (born 1974), Czech astronomer at the Astronomický Ústav Univerzity Karlovy (Astronomical Institute, Charles University), Prague	JPL · 21888
21891 Andreabocelli	1999 VZ_{2}	Andrea Bocelli (born 1958) is an Italian tenor renowned worldwide as a pop music, opera and crossover performer. He has sold over 80 million CDs worldwide and in 2010 received a star on the Hollywood Walk of Fame for his contribution to live theater	JPL · 21891
21900 Orus	1999 VQ_{10}	Orus, an Achaean warrior who was killed by Hektor in Homer's Iliad.	JPL · 21900

== 21901–22000 ==
back to top

Named minor planet	Provisional	This minor planet was named for...	Ref; Catalog
21903 Wallace	1999 VE_{12}	Patrick T. Wallace, British specialist in telescope control software, currently head of Her Majesty's Nautical Almanac Office	JPL · 21903
21913 Taylorjones	1999 VK_{28}	Taylor Wesley Jones, American finalist in the 2005 Discovery Channel Young Scientist Challenge (DCYSC) † ‡	MPC · 21913
21914 Melakabinoff	1999 VX_{34}	Melanie Paige Kabinoff, American finalist in the 2005 DCYSC † ‡	MPC · 21914
21915 Lavins	1999 VE_{35}	Gregory M. Lavins, American finalist in the 2005 DCYSC † ‡	MPC · 21915
21919 Luga	1999 VV_{47}	Melissa Pomaikai Akiko Luga, American finalist in the 2005 DCYSC † ‡	MPC · 21919
21921 Camdenmiller	1999 VE_{49}	Camden Yinhung Miller, American finalist in the 2005 DCYSC † ‡	MPC · 21921
21922 Mocz	1999 VK_{49}	Lucia Mocz, American finalist in the 2005 DCYSC † ‡	MPC · 21922
21924 Alyssaovaitt	1999 VN_{53}	Alyssa Kurtz Ovaitt, American finalist in the 2005 DCYSC † ‡	MPC · 21924
21925 Supasternak	1999 VW_{53}	Susan Marie Pasternak, American finalist in the 2005 DCYSC † ‡	MPC · 21925
21926 Jacobperry	1999 VH_{54}	Jacob P. Perry, American finalist in the 2005 DCYSC † ‡	MPC · 21926
21927 Sarahpierz	1999 VB_{55}	Sarah Marie Pierz, American finalist in the 2005 DCYSC † ‡	MPC · 21927
21928 Prabakaran	1999 VX_{55}	Sabrina Lakshmi Prabakran, American finalist in the 2005 DCYSC † ‡	MPC · 21928
21929 Nileshraval	1999 VP_{56}	Nilesh Kaushik Raval, American finalist in the 2005 DCYSC † ‡	MPC · 21929
21932 Rios	1999 VP_{65}	Roberto Andres Rios, Puerto Rican finalist in the 2005 DCYSC † ‡	MPC · 21932
21933 Aaronrozon	1999 VL_{70}	Aaron Alexander Rozon, American finalist in the 2005 DCYSC † ‡	MPC · 21933
21936 Ryan	1999 VH_{79}	Colleen Marie Ryan, American finalist in the 2005 DCYSC † ‡	MPC · 21936
21937 Basheehan	1999 VV_{80}	Brittany Ann Sheehan, American finalist in the 2005 DCYSC † ‡	MPC · 21937
21939 Kasmith	1999 VJ_{89}	Katherine Ann Smith, American finalist in the 2005 DCYSC † ‡	MPC · 21939
21942 Subramanian	1999 VN_{106}	Narayan Swamy Subramanian, American finalist in the 2005 DCYSC † ‡	MPC · 21942
21943 Diannacowern	1999 VG_{114}	Dianna Leilani Cowern (born 1989), American science communicator and YouTuber by the name of Physics Girl.	MPC · 21943
21945 Kleshchonok	1999 VL_{135}	Valery Volodymyrovich Kleshchonok, Ukrainian astronomer at the Astronomical Observatory of Kyiv Shevchenko National University	JPL · 21945
21949 Tatulian	1999 VA_{156}	Adrian Surenovich Tatulian, American finalist in the 2005 DCYSC † ‡	MPC · 21949
21952 Terry	1999 VD_{165}	Bailey Holly Terry, American finalist in the 2005 DCYSC † ‡	MPC · 21952
21956 Thangada	1999 VE_{179}	Neela Devi Thangada, American finalist in the 2005 DCYSC † ‡	MPC · 21956
21958 Tripuraneni	1999 VU_{185}	Nilesh Tripuraneni, American finalist in the 2005 DCYSC † ‡	MPC · 21958
21962 Scottsandford	1999 VS_{203}	Scott Alan Sandford, American astronomer and meteoriticist at NASA's Ames Research Center, a co-investigator on the Stardust mission	JPL · 21962
21964 Kevinhousen	1999 VK_{213}	Kevin R. Housen, American associate technical fellow at the Boeing Corporation, a pioneer in the study of asteroidal collision	JPL · 21964
21965 Dones	1999 VO_{213}	Henry C. "Luke" Dones, American solar system dynamicist at the Southwest Research Institute in Boulder	JPL · 21965
21966 Hamadori	1999 WJ_{9}	Hamadori is a coastal region in Fukushima prefecture, Japan.	JPL · 21966
21970 Tyle	1999 XC	Sheel Tyle, American finalist in the 2005 DCYSC † ‡	MPC · 21970
21985 Šejna	1999 XG_{15}	Karel Šejna, conductor of the Czech Philharmonic Orchestra †	MPC · 21985
21986 Alexanduribe	1999 XO_{17}	Alexander Tyler Uribe, American finalist in the 2005 Discovery Channel Young Scientist Challenge (DCYSC) † ‡	MPC · 21986
21989 Werntz	1999 XU_{20}	Ruslan Alan Werntz, American finalist in the 2005 DCYSC † ‡	MPC · 21989
21990 Garretyazzie	1999 XH_{22}	Garrett Michael Yazzie, American finalist in the 2005 DCYSC † ‡	MPC · 21990
21991 Zane	1999 XM_{23}	Robert Teruo Zane, American finalist in the 2005 DCYSC † ‡	MPC · 21991
21999 Disora	1999 XS_{38}	Mario Di Sora, Italian lawyer and amateur astronomer, founder and manager of the Osservatorio Astronomico di Campo Catino (Campo Catino Observatory), light pollution fighter	JPL · 21999

back to top

Preceded by 20,001–21,000	Meanings of minor-planet names List of minor planets: 21,001–22,000	Succeeded by 22,001–23,000
