= Meanings of minor-planet names: 19001–20000 =

As minor planet discoveries are confirmed, they are given a permanent number by the IAU's Minor Planet Center (MPC), and the discoverers can then submit names for them, following the IAU's naming conventions. The list below concerns those minor planets in the specified number-range that have received names, and explains the meanings of those names.

Official naming citations of newly named small Solar System bodies are approved and published in a bulletin by IAU's Working Group for Small Bodies Nomenclature (WGSBN). Before May 2021, citations were published in MPC's Minor Planet Circulars for many decades. Recent citations can also be found on the JPL Small-Body Database (SBDB). Until his death in 2016, German astronomer Lutz D. Schmadel compiled these citations into the Dictionary of Minor Planet Names (DMP) and regularly updated the collection.

Based on Paul Herget's The Names of the Minor Planets, Schmadel also researched the unclear origin of numerous asteroids, most of which had been named prior to World War II. This article incorporates text from this source, which is in the public domain: SBDB New namings may only be added to this list below after official publication as the preannouncement of names is condemned. The WGSBN publishes a comprehensive guideline for the naming rules of non-cometary small Solar System bodies.

== 19001–19100 ==
Named minor planet	Provisional	This minor planet was named for...	Ref · Catalog
19002 Tongkexue	2000 RD_{61}	TongKe Xue, ISEF awardee in 2003	MPC · 19002
19003 Erinfrey	2000 RL_{61}	Erin Lynn Frey, ISEF awardee in 2003	MPC · 19003
19004 Chirayath	2000 RU_{62}	Ved Chirayath, ISEF awardee in 2003	MPC · 19004
19005 Teckman	2000 RY_{64}	Megan Elizabeth Teckman, ISEF awardee in 2003	MPC · 19005
19007 Nirajnathan	2000 RD_{68}	Niraj Rama Nathan, ISEF awardee in 2003	MPC · 19007
19008 Kristibutler	2000 RV_{70}	Kristin L. Butler, ISEF awardee in 2003	MPC · 19008
19009 Galenmaly	2000 RF_{72}	Galen Daniel Maly, ISEF awardee in 2003	MPC · 19009
19017 Susanlederer	2000 RH_{93}	Susan M. Lederer (born 1970), American planetary scientist and assistant professor of physics	JPL · 19017
19019 Sunflower	2000 SB	Sunflower Observatory †	MPC · 19019
19022 Penzel	2000 SR_{44}	Edgar Penzel, ISEF awardee in 2003	MPC · 19022
19023 Varela	2000 SH_{111}	Elizabeth Van Cortlandt Varela, ISEF awardee in 2003	MPC · 19023
19025 Arthurpetron	2000 SC_{117}	Arthur Joseph Petron, ISEF awardee in 2003	MPC · 19025
19029 Briede	2000 SR_{205}	Paul Briede, ISEF awardee in 2003	MPC · 19029
19034 Santorini	2554 P-L	Santorini, a Greek island in the Aegean Sea.	JPL · 19034
19066 Ellarie	4068 T-2	Ella Marie (Ellarie) Chase Rosales (born 1966) of Jalisco, Mexico, is a close family friend of astronomer Daniel W. E. Green, who made the identifications for this minor planet	JPL · 19066
19079 Hernández	1967 KC	José Hernández, Argentinian gaucho poet	JPL · 19079
19080 Martínfierro	1970 JB	Martín Fierro, fictitious Argentinian hero of the poems by José Hernández	JPL · 19080
19081 Mravinskij	1973 SX_{2}	Evgenii Mravinskii, (1903–1988), an outstanding Russian musician and conductor.	JPL · 19081
19082 Vikchernov	1976 QS	Viktor Mikhailovich Chernov (1902–1984), a Ukrainian astronomer who obtained valuable new results on variable stars, on the dependence of brightness and color of lunar eclipses on solar activity, as well as on transient lunar phenomena	JPL · 19082
19083 Mizuki	1977 DA_{4}	Mizuki is an ancient Japanese castle built in Chikushi (now Fukuoka city) in Fukuoka Prefecture in 664. The base of the castle was 1 km by 80 m.	JPL · 19083
19084 Eilestam	1978 RQ_{9}	Olle Eilestam (born 1966) is an entertainer and piano player with a large repertoire of different music.	JPL · 19084
19091 Hagen	1978 XX	John P. Hagen, American solar radio astronomer.	IAU · 19091
19096 Leonfridman	1979 TY_{1}	Architect Leonid Osherovich Fridman (born 1948), director of the Crimean Institute of Design, Architect and Restoration.	JPL · 19096

== 19101–19200 ==
back to top

Named minor planet	Provisional	This minor planet was named for...	Ref · Catalog
19119 Dimpna	1981 SG_{3}	The Dictionary of Minor Planet Names which was edited by astronomer Lutz Schmadel	JPL · 19119
19120 Doronina	1983 PM_{1}	Actress Tat'yana Vasil'evna Doronina (born 1933) created splendid roles for both stage and screen. She worked in the largest Leningrad and Moscow theaters and since 1992 has been leader of the Moscow Art Academic Gorky Theatre. She was awarded People's artist of Russia (1969) and of the U.S.S.R. (1975).	JPL · 19120
19121 Rathnasree	1985 CY_{1}	Rathnasree Nandivada (1963–2021), Indian astronomer, former director of the Nehru Planetarium in New Delhi.	JPL · 19121
19122 Amandabosh	1985 VF_{1}	Amanda S. Bosh (born 1965), a lecturer in the Department of Earth, Atmospheric, and Planetary Sciences at the Massachusetts Institute of Technology.	JPL · 19122
19123 Stephenlevine	1986 TP_{1}	Stephen E. Levine (born 1965), an astronomer at Lowell Observatory, is the Discovery Channel Telescope Commissioning Scientist.	JPL · 19123
19126 Ottohahn	1987 QW	Otto Hahn (1879–1968), German chemist and Nobel Laureate in 1944	JPL · 19126
19127 Olegefremov	1987 QH_{10}	Oleg Efremov, chief producer and actor of Sovremennik.	JPL · 19127
19129 Loos	1988 AL_{1}	Adolf Loos, Austrian architect	MPC · 19129
19130 Tytgat	1988 CG_{2}	Edgard Tytgat, 19th/20th-century Belgian expressionist painter	JPL · 19130
19132 Le Clézio	1988 CL_{4}	French-Mauritian novelist of more than 30 novels, J. M. G. Le Clézio (born 1940) is particularly well known for his Voyage to Rodrigues. He was awarded the 2008 Nobel Prize for Literature based on his "authorship of new departures, poetic adventure and sensual ecstasy"	JPL · 19132
19135 Takashionaka	1988 XQ	Takashi Onaka (born 1952) is a professor of infrared astronomy at the University of Tokyo. He is known for his comprehensive study of the interplanetary, circumstellar and interstellar dust based on ground-based/space-borne observations, theoretical approaches and laboratory experiments.	JPL · 19135
19136 Strassmann	1989 AZ_{6}	Fritz Strassmann (1902–1980), German chemist	JPL · 19136
19137 Copiapó	1989 CP_{2}	Copiapó, a mining district in northern Chile, was in 2010 the scene of a severe mining accident, with 33 miners buried alive at a depth of almost 700 meters for more than two months. They were finally rescued alive and healthy	JPL · 19137
19139 Apian	1989 GJ_{8}	Peter Apian (1495–1552), a German mathematician and cartographer.	JPL · 19139
19140 Jansmit	1989 RJ_{2}	Jan Smit (born 1948), Dutch geologist and paleontologist	JPL · 19140
19141 Poelkapelle	1989 SB_{4}	Poelkapelle, a village in West Flanders near the city of Ypres.	JPL · 19141
19142 Langemarck	1989 SU_{4}	Langemarck, a village in West Flanders.	JPL · 19142
19148 Alaska	1989 YA_{5}	Alaska	JPL · 19148
19149 Boccaccio	1990 EZ_{2}	Giovanni Boccaccio (1313–1375), an Italian poet and essayist.	JPL · 19149
19155 Lifeson	1990 SX_{3}	Alex Lifeson (Alexander Zivojinovich), Canadian guitarist and co-founder of the band Rush and an Officer of the Order of Canada	JPL · 19155
19156 Heco	1990 SE_{4}	Joseph Heco (Hikozo Hamada, 1837–1897) was born in Harima town, Hyogo prefecture. He survived a shipwreck in 1851, was taken to the US and became one of the first Japanese to become a US citizen. Returning to Japan, he published the first Japanese newspaper, while Japan was still closed to the outside world	JPL · 19156
19159 Taenakano	1990 TT	Tae Nakano (born 1975) plays an active part as a planetarian in the Kita-Kyushu Children's Culture and Science Museum and a researcher in the Kyushu Institute of Technology. She also undertakes outreach activities with nano-satellites.	JPL · 19159
19160 Chikayoshitomi	1990 TC_{1}	Chika Yoshitomi (born 1981) plays an active part as an astronomy communicator in Kyushu, Japan. She has worked at Hoshi no Bunka Kan, Tachibana Observatory and Kasuga-ciry Hoshi no Yakata, and has brought up many "little" astronomers.	JPL · 19160
19161 Sakawa	1990 TQ_{1}	The Japanese town of Sakawa in the Kochi prefecture with a population of 20,000, known for brewing a famous brand of sake. It has produced many noted politicians, scientists, and musicians, including Masamitsu Yamasaki, who discovered comet 27P/Crommelin independently in 1928.	JPL · 19161
19162 Wambsganss	1990 TZ_{1}	Joachim Wambsganss (born 1961), a German astronomer.	JPL · 19162
19165 Nariyuki	1991 CD	Kiyoshi Nariyuki (born 1960) has played an active part in astronomical clubs in his area, often becoming their leader in his pursuit of amateur astronomy over the past 30 years. A 0.25-m telescope is installed in the private observatory he completed in 2005.	JPL · 19165
19173 Virginiaterése	1991 GE_{2}	Virginia Terése Bogdanovich, American amateur astronomer, who assisted in organizing the photographic glass plate archive of the 1.2-m Schmidt Oschin Telescope at Palomar Observatory	JPL · 19173
19175 Peterpiot	1991 PP_{2}	Peter Piot (born 1949), a Belgian physician, co-discovered the ebola virus in Zaire in 1976.	JPL · 19175
19178 Walterbothe	1991 RV_{2}	Walter Bothe, A professor at Berlin, Giessen and Heidelberg.	JPL · 19178
19182 Pitz	1991 TX_{2}	Eckhart Pitz (born 1940), a German physicist at the Heidelberg Max-Planck-Institut für Astronomie. He is a leading expert in astronomical instrumentation, from the extreme ultraviolet to the far infrared.	JPL · 19182
19183 Amati	1991 TB_{5}	The Amati family of violin makers worked in Cremona in the sixteenth and seventeenth centuries.	JPL · 19183
19185 Guarneri	1991 TL_{13}	The Guarneri family of violin makers was active in Cremona for several generations.	JPL · 19185
19188 Dittebesard	1991 YT	Ditte Besard (1977–2010), eldest daughter of Camilla and artist Hugo Besard, died after a struggle over many years. Implicitly remembering the goddess Eunomia, her father expressed his feelings as follows: Hour after hour, day after day, time comes downwards like falling snow and covers the present with a carpet	JPL · 19188
19189 Stradivari	1991 YE_{1}	Antonio Stradivari, Italian violin maker.	JPL · 19189
19190 Morihiroshi	1992 AM_{1}	Hiroshi Mori (born 1958), a Japanese amateur astronomer, is one of the members of the Yamaneko Group of Comet Observers.	JPL · 19190
19197 Akasaki	1992 EO	Yuka Akasaki (born 1960) has been a coach at a swimming school in Nankoku city for more than 20 years and has coached many excellent swimmers. She herself competes in Japanese Masters' swimming competitions.	JPL · 19197

== 19201–19300 ==
back to top

Named minor planet	Provisional	This minor planet was named for...	Ref · Catalog
19204 Joshuatree	1992 ME	Joshua Tree National Park, founded in 1936 as Joshua Tree National Monument largely through the efforts of Minerva Hoyt (1866–1945).	JPL · 19204
19208 Starrfield	1992 RW	Sumner Starrfield (born 1940), American astronomer	JPL · 19208
19210 Higayoshihiro	1992 YE_{4}	Yoshihiro Higa (1965–2015) was an amateur astronomer and science communicator. He created the first astronomical science cafe in Sendai, Japan. He was also an amateur meteor researcher.	JPL · 19210
19224 Orosei	1993 RJ_{3}	Roberto Orosei (born 1968), Italian astronomer and contributor to ESA-missions	JPL · 19224
19226 Peiresc	1993 RA_{8}	Nicolas-Claude Fabri de Peiresc (1580–1637), a French humanist and philosopher with a great interest in astronomy.	JPL · 19226
19228 Uemuraikuo	1993 SN_{1}	Ikuo Uemura (born 1940) is a passionate and leading member of his local astronomical club Pleiades.	JPL · 19228
19230 Sugazi	1993 TU	Sugazi Tanaka (born 1947), Japanese astronomer and director of the Inagawa Observatory	JPL · 19230
19234 Victoriahibbs	1993 VC_{1}	Victoria Pavin Hibbs (born 1954) has been known to the discoverer since her birth. She is now a learning specialist for children in science and mathematics and a water color installation artist.	JPL · 19234
19235 van Schurman	1993 VS_{4}	Anna Maria van Schurman (1607–1678) was the first female student at the University of Utrecht, although she was obliged to follow the courses from behind a curtain. Excelling in many disciplines, she was one of the most intellectual women in Europe. A true polyglot, she corresponded actively with scholars around the world	JPL · 19235
19243 Bunting	1994 CD_{9}	John Bunting, Scottish born Australian geologist, discovered Yarrabubba impact structure in Western Australia	MPC · 19243
19246 Megumisasaki	1994 EL_{7}	Megumi Sasaki, Japanese physical therapist, trained one discoverer following a cerebral infarction and allowed him to walk again	IAU · 19246
19250 Poullain	1994 PF_{26}	François Poullain de la Barre (1647–1725) was a French priest, writer, and Cartesian and feminist philosopher. In 1673 he published a radical and philosophically sophisticated defense of the equality of women and men.	JPL · 19250
19251 Totziens	1994 RY_{1}	Tot ziens!, Dutch for 'Au revoir'; the discovery was made shortly after the 1994 IAU meeting in The Hague †	MPC · 19251
19254 Shojitomoko	1994 VD_{7}	This name is a combination of the names of the first discoverer's parents, Shoji (b. 1929) and Tomoko (1931–2011) Hirasawa. Shoji made his son's first telescope.	IAU · 19254
19258 Gongyi	1995 FT_{20}	Gongyi, Henan, People's Republic of China	JPL · 19258
19262 Lucarubini	1995 OB_{1}	Luca Rubini (1980–2014) was an entrepreneur, astronomy enthusiast, science communicator and expert astrophotographer. The high-quality deep-sky images he produced have been published in specialized journals.	JPL · 19262
19263 Lavater	1995 OH_{10}	Johann Kaspar Lavater (1741–1801), a Swiss writer, clergyman and religious philosopher.	JPL · 19263
19268 Morstadt	1995 UZ	Josef Morstadt (1797–1869), a Czech astronomer, physicist and mathematician.	JPL · 19268
19282 Zhangcunhao	1996 AM_{15}	Zhang Cunhao (1928–2024) is an Academician of the Chinese Academy of Sciences and an Academician of the Academy of Sciences for the Developing World.	JPL · 19282
19287 Paronelli	1996 DH_{1}	Fede Paronelli (1893–1944), Italian philosopher and astronomer, lecturer at Hoepli planetarium †	MPC · 19287
19288 Egami	1996 FJ_{5}	Katsunori Egami (born 1959) is the leader of the astronomical volunteers at the Fukuoka Science Museum.	JPL · 19288
19290 Schroeder	1996 JR_{1}	Jeff Schroeder (born 1954) has contributed to the mechanical design and fabrication of all the NEAT cameras, starting with the 1995 NEAT/GEODSS camera, continuing with the 2000 NEAT/MSSS camera and concluding with the 2001 NEAT/Oschin camera. He has worked at the Jet Propulsion Laboratory at JPL for 22 years.	JPL · 19290
19291 Karelzeman	1996 LF	Karel Zeman (1910–1989), a Czech filmmaking genius and experimentator.	JPL · 19291
19293 Dedekind	1996 OF	Richard Dedekind (1831–1916), a German mathematician and also an accomplished pianist and cellist.	JPL · 19293
19294 Weymouth	1996 PF	John Weymouth (born 1922), professor emeritus of physics at the University of Nebraska.	JPL · 19294
19298 Zhongkeda	1996 SU_{4}	Zhongguokeda, native name of the University of Science and Technology of China	JPL · 19298
19300 Xinglong	1996 SH_{6}	Xinglong, a county of Chengde city, Hebei Province, China.	IAU · 19300

== 19301–19400 ==
back to top

Named minor planet	Provisional	This minor planet was named for...	Ref · Catalog
19303 Chinacyo	1996 TP_{1}	Chinacyo town is on Okinoerabujima island, one of the Amami Islands, in Kagoshima Prefecture in the southern Japan.	JPL · 19303
19304 Yoshidaseiko	1996 TQ_{1}	Seiko Yoshida (b. 1952), a Japanese researcher in the history of astronomy.	IAU · 19304
19306 Voves	1996 TN_{12}	Voves is a French town, located in the Beauce natural region, Eure-et-Loir department	JPL · 19306
19307 Hanayama	1996 TG_{13}	Hidekazu Hanayama (born 1977) is an astronomer at the National Astronomical Observatory of Japan. He works on observational studies of transient objects with the Murikabushi 1.05-m reflector at the Ishigakijima Astronomical Observatory and discovered a secondary nuclear condensation of comet 213P/Van Ness.	JPL · 19307
19310 Osawa	1996 VF_{1}	Osawa, meaning big dale, is the name of the area in the southwestern part of Mitaka City where the National Observatory is located.	MPC · 19310
19311 Susantresch	1996 VF_{3}	Susan Tresch Fienberg, American administrator.	IAU · 19311
19313 Shibatakazunari	1996 VF_{8}	Kazunari Shibata (born 1954) is a professor at Kyoto University, and has served as director of Kwasan and Hida Observatories for 15 years. He has contributed to the understanding of the basic magnetohydrodynamic mechanism of jets and ares on the Sun, stars, accretion disks, and active galactic nuclei.	JPL · 19313
19314 Nakamuratetsu	1996 VT_{8}	Tetsu Nakamura (1946–2019) was a Japanese medical doctor who worked for the Afghan people and who was gunned down on his way to his project site in Afghanistan. He started providing medical services for leprosy patients in 1984, and later for Afghan refugees in Peshawar, Pakistan.	JPL · 19314
19315 Aizunisshinkan	1996 VY_{8}	Nisshinkan, a school for children of Aizu feudal lords during Japan's Edo period. It was notable for being one of the few schools of the time to have an observatory.	IAU · 19315
19318 Somanah	1996 XB_{2}	Radhakhrishna Dinesh Somanah, Mauritian professor of physics and astrophysics and one of three pioneers of professional astronomy in the republic.	JPL · 19318
19331 Stefanovitale	1996 XL_{33}	Stefano Vitale (born 1951) is a full professor of physics at University of Trento. He is the PI of the LISA Technology Package payload on board the LISA Pathfinder mission of the ESA, launched in 2015 as a precursor to a space-borne gravitational wave observatory.	JPL · 19331
19348 Cueca	1997 CL_{12}	The cueca, the complex national dance of Chile, dates to around 1824. Partners mimic movements of rooster and hen in courting, holding and waving a white handkerchief in the right hand, dancing to guitar music, voices, drums and clapping. The name was suggested by J. Montani	JPL · 19348
19349 Denjoy	1997 CF_{22}	Arnaud Denjoy (1884–1974) was one of a group of French mathematicians (including Baire, Borel and Lebesgue) who in the early twentieth century initiated a new approach to the theory of functions of real variables, measure theory and integration.	JPL · 19349
19353 Pierrethierry	1997 EQ_{30}	Pierre Thierry (born 1950) has built equipment designed for making astronomical observations. He created the Association des Utilisateurs de Détecteurs Electroniques in 1994	JPL · 19353
19354 Fredkoehler	1997 FS_{2}	Frederic Koehler (born 1994), ISTS awardee in 2012	JPL · 19354
19355 Merpalehmann	1997 FU_{2}	Meredith Paloma Lehmann (born 1995), ISTS awardee in 2012	JPL · 19355
19364 Semafor	1997 SM_{1}	Theatre Semafor was a special phenomenon of Prague cultural life in the 1960s, with leading personalities Jirí Suchý (born 1931) and Jirí Slitr (1924–1969). Many of their songs became popular and they can be still heard by campfires.	JPL · 19364
19366 Sudingqiang	1997 VZ_{7}	Su Ding-qiang (born 1936), an astronomer and optical engineering expert, made many creative contributions to Chinese astronomical instruments, including a new idea to apply active optics to obtain the shape of a changeable optical system that could not be realized in the conventional way	JPL · 19366
19367 Pink Floyd	1997 XW_{3}	Pink Floyd, an influential English progressive rock group.	JPL · 19367
19370 Yukyung	1997 YY_{8}	Yuk Yung (born 1946), a Caltech planetary scientist.	JPL · 19370
19379 Labrecque	1998 BR_{7}	Steve LaBrecque (born 1964) was responsible for the successful installation and operations of the NEAT/MSSS camera in 2000. At the Jet Propulsion Laboratory he has also worked on the Mars orbital camera. Earlier he developed and serviced shipboard oceanographic equipment at the Lamont Doherty Geological Observatory.	JPL · 19379
19383 Rolling Stones	1998 BZ_{32}	The Rolling Stones are the longest lasting rock-and-roll group, embarking on their fortieth anniversary of great music.	JPL · 19383
19384 Winton	1998 CP_{1}	Nicholas Winton, rescuer of 669 Jewish children † +	MPC · 19384
19386 Axelcronstedt	1998 CR_{4}	Axel Fredrik Cronstedt (1722–1765), a mining expert and director of mines in central Sweden, discovered the new element nickel in minerals he found in Hälsingland. Using phosphorus salts and the blowpipe technique he qualitatively analyzed colored metallic oxides	JPL · 19386
19390 Deledda	1998 DK_{14}	Grazia Deledda (1871–1936) was an Italian writer who received the Nobel Prize in Literature in 1926 for her idealistically-inspired writings which, with clarity, picture the life on Sardinia, her native island.	IAU · 19390
19392 Oyamada	1998 EP_{1}	Hiroyuki Oyamada (born 1970), an amateur astronomer and a member of the Chokainomori Astronomy Club in Sakata, Yamagata, Japan.	JPL · 19392
19393 Davidthompson	1998 DT_{33}	David Thompson (1770–1857), a British-Canadian furtrader and surveyor, mapped 3.9 million square kilometers of North America. Navigating the full length of the Columbia River in 1811, he produced a high-quality map of the river basin. He has been called the greatest land geographer who ever lived	JPL · 19393
19395 Barrera	1998 EP_{1}	Luis Barrera (born 1965) is head of the Institute for Astronomy of the Universidad Catholica del Norte in Antofagasta.	JPL · 19395
19397 Lagarini	1998 ER_{3}	Andrea Lagarini (born 1963) is an assistant in the science department of the European Southern Observatory in Santiago de Chile.	JPL · 19397
19398 Creedence	1998 EM_{8}	Creedence Clearwater Revival, frequently referred to as CCR or simply "Creedence", was an American rock band that gained popularity in the late 1960s and early 1970s	JPL · 19398
19400 Emileclaus	1998 EC_{11}	Emile Claus (1849–1924), was a Belgian Flemish painter, known for his landscapes, especially from and around the Lys river. Influenced by Claude Monet, he developed his own impressionism and is now considered the leader of the Belgian Luminism movement. Among his most famous paintings is De Ijsvogels (1891)	JPL · 19400

== 19401–19500 ==
back to top

Named minor planet	Provisional	This minor planet was named for...	Ref · Catalog
19407 Standing Bear	1998 FG_{11}	Arrested for refusing to be moved to Indian Territory, Standing Bear (1834–1908) petitioned the U.S. District Court in Omaha, Nebraska, in 1879 by writ of habeas corpus. The trial led to the decision that Native Americans are "persons within the meaning of the law" and have the rights of citizenship.	JPL · 19407
19410 Guisard	1998 FW_{14}	Stéphane Guisard (born 1970), an optician at the European Southern Observatory in Cerro Paranal, where he is working on the Very Large Telescope, including the very complex interferometer.	JPL · 19410
19411 Collinarnold	1998 FJ_{22}	Collin David Arnold, ISEF awardee in 2003	JPL · 19411
19413 Grantlewis	1998 FB_{30}	Grant Allen Lewis, ISEF awardee in 2003	JPL · 19413
19415 Parvamenon	1998 FC_{34}	Parvathy Rama Menon, ISEF awardee in 2003	JPL · 19415
19416 Benglass	1998 FM_{34}	Benjamin William Glass, ISEF awardee in 2003	JPL · 19416
19417 Madelynho	1998 FG_{40}	Madelyn Meng-Ling Ho, ISEF awardee in 2003	JPL · 19417
19419 Pinkham	1998 FO_{49}	Brian Edward Pinkham, ISEF awardee in 2003	JPL · 19419
19420 Vivekbuch	1998 FB_{54}	Vivek Paresh Buch, ISEF awardee in 2003	JPL · 19420
19421 Zachulett	1998 FD_{56}	Zachary Frank Hulett, ISEF awardee in 2003	JPL · 19421
19423 Hefter	1998 FD_{58}	Jonathan S. Hefter, ISEF awardee in 2003	JPL · 19423
19424 Andrewsong	1998 FH_{61}	Andrew Joshua Song, ISEF awardee in 2003	JPL · 19424
19425 Nicholasrapp	1998 FW_{61}	Nicholas Dorian Rapp, ISEF awardee in 2003	JPL · 19425
19426 Leal	1998 FP_{65}	Eddy Leal, ISEF awardee in 2003	JPL · 19426
19428 Gracehsu	1998 FU_{66}	Grace Hsu, ISEF awardee in 2003	JPL · 19428
19429 Grubaugh	1998 FD_{69}	Daniel Boyd Grubaugh, ISEF awardee in 2003	JPL · 19429
19430 Kristinaufer	1998 FO_{69}	Kristina Ann Ufer, ISEF awardee in 2003	JPL · 19430
19433 Naftz	1998 FG_{72}	Douglas Calvin Naftz, ISEF awardee in 2003	JPL · 19433
19434 Bahuffman	1998 FD_{75}	Benjamin Allen Huffman, ISEF awardee in 2003	JPL · 19434
19436 Marycole	1998 FR_{76}	Mary Elizabeth Cole, ISEF awardee in 2003	JPL · 19436
19437 Jennyblank	1998 FQ_{79}	Jennifer Renee Blank, ISEF awardee in 2003	JPL · 19437
19438 Khaki	1998 FF_{83}	Shirin Khaki, ISEF awardee in 2003	JPL · 19438
19439 Allisontjong	1998 FB_{91}	Allison Krystle Weili Tjong], ISEF awardee in 2003	JPL · 19439
19440 Sumatijain	1998 FN_{103}	Sumati Kumari Jain, ISEF awardee in 2003	JPL · 19440
19441 Trucpham	1998 FJ_{105}	Truc Thanh Pham, ISEF awardee in 2003	JPL · 19441
19442 Brianrice	1998 FM_{106}	Brian Todd Rice, ISEF awardee in 2003	JPL · 19442
19443 Yanzhong	1998 FE_{109}	Yan Zhong, ISEF awardee in 2003	JPL · 19443
19444 Addicott	1998 FT_{109}	Charles Michael Addicott, ISEF awardee in 2003	JPL · 19444
19446 Muroski	1998 FX_{113}	Megan Elizabeth Muroski, ISEF awardee in 2003	JPL · 19446
19447 Jessicapearl	1998 FD_{114}	Jessica Pearl Swartz, ISEF awardee in 2003	JPL · 19447
19448 Jenniferling	1998 FJ_{122}	Jennifer Shui-Ming Ling, ISEF awardee in 2003	JPL · 19448
19450 Sussman	1998 FF_{125}	Gene Everett Sussman, ISEF awardee in 2003	JPL · 19450
19452 Keeney	1998 FX_{125}	Chelsea Ray Keeney, ISEF awardee in 2003	JPL · 19452
19453 Murdochorne	1998 FM_{126}	Richard Murdoch and Kenneth Horne, British comedians.	JPL · 19453
19454 Henrymarr	1998 FX_{127}	Henry Louis Marr, ISEF awardee in 2003	JPL · 19454
19456 Pimdouglas	1998 HU_{5}	Pim (1995–2001), son of Nigel and Jantina Douglas, enjoyed a brief life and brought joy to his family. This minor planet was discovered on his third birthday.	JPL · 19456
19457 Robcastillo	1998 HE_{6}	Roberto Castillo (born 1961) works at the European Southern Observatory's Paranal site, where he takes care of several instruments. He also builds telescopes for amateurs, and it is said that half the amateur telescopes in Chile have been constructed by him.	JPL · 19457
19458 Legault	1998 HE_{8}	Thierry Legault (born 1962), an amateur astronomer.	JPL · 19458
19461 Feingold	1998 HZ_{16}	Samantha Megan Feingold, ISEF awardee in 2003	JPL · 19461
19462 Ulissedini	1998 HE_{20}	Ulisse Dini, an Italian mathematician.	JPL · 19462
19463 Emilystoll	1998 HY_{29}	Emily Erin Stoll, ISEF awardee in 2003	JPL · 19463
19464 Ciarabarr	1998 HZ_{29}	Ciara Ann Barr, ISEF awardee in 2003	JPL · 19464
19465 Amandarusso	1998 HA_{32}	Amanda Maria Russo, ISEF awardee in 2003	JPL · 19465
19466 Darcydiegel	1998 HQ_{34}	Darcy Renee Diegel, ISEF awardee in 2003	JPL · 19466
19467 Amandanagy	1998 HU_{39}	Amanda Mychal Nagy, ISEF awardee in 2003	JPL · 19467
19470 Wenpingchen	1998 HE_{52}	Wen Ping Chen (born 1958) leads the National Central University of Taiwan's participation in the Taiwan-American Occultation Survey (TAOS), the goal of which is to map the distribution of small transneptunian objects	JPL · 19470
19473 Marygardner	1998 HE_{60}	Mary Melissa Gardner, ISEF awardee in 2003	JPL · 19473
19475 Mispagel	1998 HA_{91}	Heather Michelle Mispagel, ISEF awardee in 2003	JPL · 19475
19476 Denduluri	1998 HQ_{94}	Aditya Krishna Denduluri, ISEF awardee in 2003	JPL · 19476
19477 Teresajentz	1998 HB_{95}	Teresa Lorraine Jentz, ISEF awardee in 2003	JPL · 19477
19478 Jaimeflores	1998 HY_{96}	Jaime Eduardo Flores, ISEF awardee in 2003	JPL · 19478
19482 Harperlee	1998 HL_{102}	Harper Lee (1926–2016), an American novelist.	JPL · 19482
19484 Vanessaspini	1998 HF_{121}	Vanessa Anne Spini, ISEF awardee in 2003	MPC · 19484
19487 Rosscoleman	1998 HO_{124}	Ross Andrew Coleman, ISEF awardee in 2003	MPC · 19487
19488 Abramcoley	1998 HW_{125}	Abram Levi Coley, ISEF awardee in 2003	JPL · 19488
19494 Gerbs	1998 KJ_{8}	James ("Gerbs") Bauer (born 1968) studies the physical nature of Centaurs and other outer solar system bodies.	JPL · 19494
19495 Terentyeva	1998 KZ_{8}	Alexandra K. Terentyeva (born 1933) has been a meteor astronomer for more than 50 years at the Institute of Astronomy of the Russian Academy of Sciences. .	JPL · 19495
19496 Josephbarone	1998 KC_{32}	Joseph Michael Barone, ISEF awardee in 2003	JPL · 19496
19497 Pineda	1998 KN_{32}	Maria Luisa Pineda, ISEF awardee in 2003	JPL · 19497
19499 Eugenybiryukov	1998 KR_{42}	Eugeny Biryukov (born 1979), a lecturer at South Ural State University in Chelyabinsk, Russia.	JPL · 19499
19500 Hillaryfultz	1998 KF_{49}	Hillary Anne Fultz, ISEF awardee in 2003	JPL · 19500

== 19501–19600 ==
back to top

Named minor planet	Provisional	This minor planet was named for...	Ref · Catalog
19504 Vladalekseev	1998 LL_{2}	Vladmimir Alekseev (born 1935), Russian physicist, who has conducted ground radar investigations of the Tunguska site	JPL · 19504
19506 Angellopez	1998 MN_{4}	Angel Lopez Jimenez (b. 1955), an observer at Mallorca Observatory.	IAU · 19506
19509 Niigata	1998 MG_{38}	Niigata prefecture is located on the island of Honshu, Japan.	JPL · 19509
19517 Robertocarlos	1998 SK_{164}	Roberto Carlos Braga, Brazilian pop singer	JPL · 19517
19518 Moulding	1998 VZ_{13}	Erin Louise Moulding, ISEF awardee in 2003	MPC · 19518
19521 Chaos	1998 WH_{24}	Chaos (cosmogony)	JPL · 19521
19523 Paolofrisi	1998 YX_{3}	Paolo Frisi (1728–1784), famous Italian scientist, was an authority in the fields of mathematics, physics and astronomy.	JPL · 19523
19524 Acaciacoleman	1998 YB_{7}	Acacia Coleman is the granddaughter of the discoverer.	JPL · 19524
19528 Delloro	1999 GB_{1}	Aldo Dell'Oro (born 1971), Italian astronomer	MPC · 19528
19531 Charton	1999 GM_{32}	Heather Anne Charton, ISEF awardee in 2003	MPC · 19531
19533 Garrison	1999 GM_{35}	Carly Beth Garrison, ISEF awardee in 2003	MPC · 19533
19534 Miyagi	1999 GL_{47}	Miyagi, a Japanese prefecture in the Tohoku region of Honshu.	JPL · 19534
19535 Rowanatkinson	1999 HF_{3}	Rowan Sebastian Atkinson (born 1955), one of Britain's finest comedy actors of the last two decades, was inspired by the work of Jacques Tati and John Cleese. Whether the comedy is verbal, as in the television series Blackadder, or physical, as in Mr. Bean, Atkinson is always brilliant.	JPL · 19535
19539 Anaverdu	1999 JO_{14}	Ana Verdu, wife of Catalan discoverer Jaume Nomen	JPL · 19539
19542 Lindperkins	1999 JL_{27}	Lindsay Prentice Perkins, ISEF awardee in 2003	MPC · 19542
19543 Burgoyne	1999 JR_{30}	Nicole Burgoyne, ISEF awardee in 2003	MPC · 19543
19544 Avramkottke	1999 JN_{33}	Avram Kottke, an IFAA recipient in 2003 †	MPC · 19544
19547 Collier	1999 JP_{57}	Theresa Collier, an IFAA recipient in 2003 †	MPC · 19547
19550 Samabates	1999 JP_{61}	Samantha Lee Bates, a DCYSC awardee in 2003	MPC · 19550
19551 Peterborden	1999 JL_{62}	Peter Young Borden, a DCYSC awardee in 2003	MPC · 19551
19563 Brzezinska	1999 JB_{124}	Bogna Natalia Brzezinska, a DCYSC awardee in 2003	MPC · 19563
19564 Ajburnetti	1999 JP_{126}	Anthony James Burnetti, a DCYSC awardee in 2003	MPC · 19564
19568 Rachelmarie	1999 KY_{14}	Rachel Marie Clements, a DCYSC awardee in 2003	MPC · 19568
19570 Jessedouglas	1999 LH_{6}	Jesse Douglas (1897–1965), American mathematician	JPL · 19570
19572 Leahmarie	1999 LE_{11}	Leah Marie Crowder, a DCYSC awardee in 2003	MPC · 19572
19573 Cummings	1999 LW_{13}	Ian Douglas Cummings, a DCYSC awardee in 2003	MPC · 19573
19574 Davidedwards	1999 LQ_{21}	David Kitzmiller Edwards V, a DCYSC awardee in 2003	MPC · 19574
19575 Feeny	1999 LB_{22}	Dana Anne Feeny, a DCYSC awardee in 2003	MPC · 19575
19577 Bobbyfisher	1999 LP_{26}	Bobby Drake Fisher, a DCYSC awardee in 2003	MPC · 19577
19578 Kirkdouglas	1999 MO	Kirk Douglas (1916–2020), American actor	JPL · 19578
19582 Blow	1999 NL_{4}	Graham L. Blow (born 1954), New Zealand astronomer and photographer	JPL · 19582
19584 Sarahgerin	1999 NZ_{6}	Sarah H. Gerin, a DCYSC awardee in 2003	MPC · 19584
19585 Zachopkins	1999 NU_{7}	Zachary Harvey Hopkins, a DCYSC awardee in 2003	MPC · 19585
19587 Keremane	1999 NG_{11}	Sravya Ramadugu Keremane, a DCYSC awardee in 2003	MPC · 19587
19589 Kirkland	1999 NZ_{14}	Tyler Hollis Kirkland, a DCYSC awardee in 2003	MPC · 19589
19591 Michaelklein	1999 NW_{21}	Michael Aaron Klein, a DCYSC awardee in 2003	MPC · 19591
19593 Justinkoh	1999 NZ_{29}	Justin Koh, a DCYSC awardee in 2003	MPC · 19593
19595 Lafer-Sousa	1999 NW_{31}	Luis Lafer-Sousa, a DCYSC awardee in 2003	MPC · 19595
19596 Spegorlarson	1999 NX_{31}	Spencer Gordon Larson, a DCYSC awardee in 2003	MPC · 19596
19597 Ryanlee	1999 NJ_{32}	Ryan Thomas Lee, a DCYSC awardee in 2003	MPC · 19597
19598 Luttrell	1999 NL_{39}	Jeffrey Michael Luttrell, a DCYSC awardee in 2003	MPC · 19598
19599 Brycemelton	1999 NX_{40}	Bryce Michael Melton, a DCYSC awardee in 2003	MPC · 19599

== 19601–19700 ==
back to top

Named minor planet	Provisional	This minor planet was named for...	Ref · Catalog
19602 Austinminor	1999 NK_{42}	Austin Lee Minor, a DCYSC awardee in 2003	MPC · 19602
19603 Monier	1999 NF_{48}	Elizabeth Nicole Monier, a DCYSC awardee in 2003	MPC · 19603
19612 Noordung	1999 OO	Herman Potočnik (1892–1929), a Slovene engineer and pioneer of cosmonautics, who was the first to describe a space station in a geostationary orbit and its applications under the pseudonym of Hermann Noordung in 1928 †	JPL · 19612
19614 Montelongo	1999 OV_{1}	Michael John Montelongo, a DCYSC awardee in 2003	MPC · 19614
19617 Duhamel	1999 PH_{1}	Jean-Marie Constant Duhamel (1797–1872), a French applied mathematician, known for Duhamel's principle in the field of partial differential equations	JPL · 19617
19618 Maša	1999 PN_{3}	Maša Kandušer (born 1964) of the University of Ljubljana, Slovenia, who inspired the discoverer Jure Skvarč	JPL · 19618
19619 Bethbell	1999 QA	Beth Bell, daughter of American discoverer Graham E. Bell	JPL · 19619
19620 Auckland	1999 QG	Auckland, the largest city in New Zealand	JPL · 19620
19625 Ovaitt	1999 RT_{11}	Elena Kurtz Ovaitt (born 1989), a DCYSC awardee in 2003	MPC · 19625
19629 Serra	1999 RV_{31}	Guy Serra (1947–2000), a Catalan astrophysicist and doctoral advisor of French discoverer Alain Klotz	JPL · 19629
19630 Janebell	1999 RT_{33}	Jane Bell (born 1945), wife of American discoverer Graham E. Bell	JPL · 19630
19631 Greensleeves	1999 RY_{38}	Greensleeves, 16th-century traditional English folk song	JPL · 19631
19633 Rusjan	1999 RX_{42}	Édvard Rúsjan (1886–1911), a pioneering Slovene aircraft designer and pilot	JPL · 19633
19637 Presbrey	1999 RU_{48}	Scott Thomas Presbrey, a DCYSC awardee in 2003	MPC · 19637
19638 Johngenereid	1999 RH_{57}	John Gene Reid, a DCYSC awardee in 2003	MPC · 19638
19640 Ethanroth	1999 RP_{89}	Ethan Michael Roth, a DCYSC awardee in 2003	MPC · 19640
19643 Jacobrucker	1999 RA_{95}	Jacob Jeffrey Rucker, a DCYSC awardee in 2003	MPC · 19643
19652 Saris	1999 RC_{117}	Patrick J. G. Saris, a DCYSC awardee in 2003	MPC · 19652
19656 Simpkins	1999 RA_{122}	Taylor Simpkins, a DCYSC awardee in 2003	MPC · 19656
19658 Sloop	1999 RM_{125}	Katie Michelle Sloop, a DCYSC awardee in 2003	MPC · 19658
19660 Danielsteck	1999 RQ_{129}	Daniel D'Andrea Steck, a DCYSC awardee in 2003	MPC · 19660
19662 Stunzi	1999 RG_{132}	Joseph Robert Stunzi, a DCYSC awardee in 2003	MPC · 19662
19663 Rykerwatts	1999 RU_{133}	Ryker H. Watts, a DCYSC awardee in 2003	MPC · 19663
19664 Yancey	1999 RV_{135}	Bryan D. Yancey, a DCYSC awardee in 2003	MPC · 19664
19676 Ofeliaguilar	1999 RY_{166}	Ofelia Aguilar, mentor at the DCYSC in 2003	MPC · 19676
19678 Belczyk	1999 RO_{168}	Pamela Belczyk, mentor at the DCYSC in 2003	MPC · 19678
19679 Gretabetteo	1999 RF_{179}	Greta Betteo, mentor at the DCYSC in 2003	MPC · 19679
19691 Iwate	1999 RN_{214}	The Japanese Iwate Prefecture, the country's second largest prefecture, located in northern Honshu	JPL · 19691
19694 Dunkelman	1999 RX_{230}	Lawrence Dunkelman (1917–2002), an American optical researcher and pioneer in the development of ultraviolet detectors at Naval Research Laboratory and Goddard Space Flight Center, which he applied to astronomical and geophysical problems †	JPL · 19694
19695 Billnye	1999 RP_{234}	Bill Nye (born 1955), an American science educator, television presenter, and mechanical engineer, best known for his TV program Bill Nye the Science Guy	JPL · 19695
19700 Teitelbaum	1999 SG_{15}	Hugh E. Teitelbaum (1951–2007) received a degree in criminal justice from Northeastern University and a Law Degree from George Mason University.	JPL · 19700

== 19701–19800 ==
back to top

Named minor planet	Provisional	This minor planet was named for...	Ref · Catalog
19701 Aomori	1999 SH_{19}	Aomori Prefecture, Japan, is located in northernmost Tohoku Region, Honshu	JPL · 19701
19704 Medlock	1999 TU_{8}	Kevin Medlock (born 1954) is a Californian award-winning telescope and instrument maker known for large aperture, research-grade telescopes	JPL · 19704
19707 Tokunai	1999 TZ_{12}	Tokunai Mogami (1755–1836) explored the northern area of Japan and learned astronomy, surveying and navigation from Toshiaki Honda, a Dutch scholar. He was engaged in the investigation and development of Hokkaido, Kurile Islands and Sakhalin.	JPL · 19707
19711 Johnaligawesa	1999 TG_{219}	John N.L. Aligawesa (1949–1999) was a telecommunications lecturer at the Dares-salaam Institute of Technology (DIT) in Tanzania.	JPL · 19711
19713 Ibaraki	1999 TV_{228}	The Japanese prefecture of Ibaraki houses three research centers (Tsukuba, Tokai and Kashima) that contain more than 300 research institutes	JPL · 19713
19715 Basodino	1999 UA_{4}	Basòdino is the second-highest mountain (3273 m) in the Swiss canton Ticino; its glacier is the most significant one in the canton, but it has retreated by about 1400m in the last 150 years.	IAU · 19715
19718 Albertjarvis	1999 VF_{2}	Albert G. Jarvis (1911–1996) invented fasteners for industry and the machines to produce them. In addition to being an inventor he was also a good friend and neighbor, always ready to help repair a neighbor's home or farm machinery, or help a teenager build a science project or rebuild his or her first automobile	JPL · 19718
19719 Glasser	1999 VB_{9}	William Glasser (born 1925), a psychiatrist who developed the concepts of Choice Theory and Reality Therapy	JPL · 19719
19721 Wray	1999 VW_{11}	James D. Wray (born 1936) directed the Institute of Meteoritics (1966–1967) and was deputy P.I. for NASA Skylab Experiment S-019 (1969–1980)	JPL · 19721
19727 Allen	1999 XS_{2}	Clabon Walter Allen, Australian solar physicist	JPL · 19727
19730 Machiavelli	1999 XO_{36}	Niccolò Machiavelli (1469–1527), a Florentine statesman, Italian political theorist and writer who advocated a strong central government	JPL · 19730
19731 Tochigi	1999 XA_{151}	Tochigi, a Japanese prefecture north of Tokyo	JPL · 19731
19738 Calinger	2000 AS_{97}	Manetta Calinger, mentor at the DCYSC in 2003	MPC · 19738
19741 Callahan	2000 AN_{141}	Diane Callahan, mentor at the DCYSC in 2003	MPC · 19741
19754 Paclements	2000 CG_{95}	Pauline Clements, mentor at the DCYSC in 2003	MPC · 19754
19756 Martínezfrías	2000 EW_{50}	Jesús Martínez Frías, Spanish planetary geologist and astrobiologist.	IAU · 19756
19758 Janelcoulson	2000 GH_{100}	Janel Opal Coulson, mentor at the DCYSC in 2003	MPC · 19758
19762 Lacrowder	2000 JQ_{57}	Lee Ann Crowder, mentor at the DCYSC in 2003	MPC · 19762
19763 Klimesh	2000 MC	Matthew Klimesh (born 1968) developed the efficient data compressor for archiving the voluminous NEAT data. He has been with the Communications Systems and Research Section at Caltech's Jet Propulsion Laboratory since 1996. His research interests include data compression, rate-distortion theory and channel coding.	JPL · 19763
19766 Katiedavis	2000 OH_{4}	Katie Davis, mentor at the DCYSC in 2003	MPC · 19766
19768 Ellendoane	2000 OX_{14}	Ellen Doane, mentor at the DCYSC in 2003	MPC · 19768
19769 Dolyniuk	2000 OP_{18}	William Dolyniuk, mentor at the DCYSC in 2003	MPC · 19769
19774 Diamondback	2000 OS_{51}	Diamondback is named after the University of Maryland's mascot.	IAU · 19774
19775 Medmondson	2000 PY	Matthew Edmondson, mentor at the DCYSC in 2003	MPC · 19775
19776 Balears	2000 PA_{5}	The people of the western Mediterranean group of islands Mallorca, Menorca, Ibiza and Formentera, known as the Balears (or Balearic Islands), have a distinct culture and history.	JPL · 19776
19778 Louisgarcia	2000 QE_{29}	Louis Garcia, mentor at the DCYSC in 2003	MPC · 19778
19783 Antoniromanya	2000 QF_{71}	Father Antonio Romañá, S.J. (Antonio Romañá Pujó; 1900–1981), a Spanish mathematician and astronomer of Catalan origin and director of the Ebro Observatory (Catalan: Observatori de l'Ebre) † ‡	JPL · 19783
19787 Betsyglass	2000 QV_{114}	Betsy Glass, mentor at the DCYSC in 2003	MPC · 19787
19788 Hunker	2000 QV_{116}	Roxanne Hunker, mentor at the DCYSC in 2003	MPC · 19788
19789 Susanjohnson	2000 QP_{149}	Susan Johnson, mentor at the DCYSC in 2003	MPC · 19789

== 19801–19900 ==
back to top

Named minor planet	Provisional	This minor planet was named for...	Ref · Catalog
19801 Karenlemmon	2000 RZ_{64}	Karen Lemmon, mentor at the DCYSC in 2003	JPL · 19801
19806 Domatthews	2000 SX_{11}	Donna Matthews, mentor at the DCYSC in 2003	JPL · 19806
19808 Elainemccall	2000 SN_{85}	Elaine McCall, mentor at the DCYSC in 2003	JPL · 19808
19809 Nancyowen	2000 SC_{86}	Nancy Owen, mentor at the DCYSC in 2003	JPL · 19809
19810 Partridge	2000 SP_{112}	Mary Partridge, mentor at the DCYSC in 2003	JPL · 19810
19811 Kimperkins	2000 SY_{114}	Kimberly Perkins, mentor at the DCYSC in 2003	JPL · 19811
19813 Ericsands	2000 SF_{121}	Eric Sands, mentor at the DCYSC in 2003	JPL · 19813
19815 Marshasega	2000 ST_{127}	Marsha Sega, mentor at the DCYSC in 2003	JPL · 19815
19816 Wayneseyfert	2000 SO_{128}	Wayne Seyfert, mentor at the DCYSC in 2003	JPL · 19816
19817 Larashelton	2000 SK_{145}	Lara Shelton, mentor at the DCYSC in 2003	JPL · 19817
19818 Shotwell	2000 SB_{150}	Gary Shotwell, mentor at the DCYSC in 2003	JPL · 19818
19820 Stowers	2000 ST_{153}	Josh Stowers, mentor at the DCYSC in 2003	JPL · 19820
19821 Caroltolin	2000 SU_{154}	Carol Tolin, mentor at the DCYSC in 2003	JPL · 19821
19822 Vonzielonka	2000 SK_{169}	Beverley vonZielonka, mentor at the DCYSC in 2003	JPL · 19822
19826 Patwalker	2000 SX_{192}	Pat Walker, mentor at the DCYSC in 2003	JPL · 19826
19833 Wickwar	2000 SA_{230}	Steve Wickwar, mentor at the DCYSC in 2003	JPL · 19833
19835 Zreda	2000 SQ_{252}	Grazyna Zreda, mentor at the DCYSC in 2003	JPL · 19835
19848 Yeungchuchiu	2000 TR	At absolute magnitude 11.7, this largest minor planet found by the discoverer, just 1.2 degrees west of Jupiter, is named in honor of his father, Chu Chiu Yeung (born 1925), for his unconditional support.	JPL · 19848
19852 Jamesalbers	2000 TT_{58}	James J. Albers (born 1965), a systems engineer.	JPL · 19852
19853 Ichinomiya	2000 TL_{60}	Ichinomiya, a Japanese high school in Ichinomiya City, Aichi Prefecture	JPL · 19853
19855 Borisalexeev	2000 UE_{6}	Boris Alexeev (born 1987), ISTS awardee in 2004	JPL · 19855
19857 Amandajane	2000 UC_{11}	Amanda Jennifer Jane Robinson is a student of psychology at the University of Kansas and an empathetic caregiver to those in need of emotional support. She is the daughter of the discoverer.	JPL · 19857
19860 Anahtar	2000 UB_{52}	Melis Nuray Anahtar (born 1986), ISTS awardee in 2004	JPL · 19860
19861 Auster	2000 US_{79}	Craig Louis Auster (born 1986), ISTS awardee in 2004	JPL · 19861
19872 Chendonghua	6097 P-L	Donghua Chen (born 1948) of Gulangyu, Xiamen, a Chinese surgeon and active amateur astronomer	JPL · 19872
19873 Chentao	6632 P-L	Tao Chen (born 1980) of Suzhou, Jiangsu, Chinese amateur astronomer and co-discoverer comet C/2008 C1 (Chen-Gao)	JPL · 19873
19874 Liudongyan	6775 P-L	Dongyan Liu (born 1987) of Suzhou, Jiangsu, a Chinese student majoring in English at Suzhou University, who served as interpreter for the International Workshop on Cometary Astronomy and a total solar eclipse expedition in China in July 2009	JPL · 19874
19875 Guedes	6791 P-L	Leandro Lage dos Santos Guedes (born 1976), a Brazilian astronomer at the Rio de Janeiro planetarium, helped to organize the fifth International Workshop on Cometary Astronomy in 2009	JPL · 19875

== 19901–20000 ==
back to top

Named minor planet	Provisional	This minor planet was named for...	Ref · Catalog
19911 Rigaux	1933 FK	Fernand Rigaux (1905–1962) was a Belgian astronomer at the Royal Observatory, Uccle, who discovered several asteroids (including the one that now bears his name).	JPL · 19911
19912 Aurapenenta	1955 RE_{1}	AURA penanta, for the fiftieth anniversary (penanta is 50 in modern Greek) of the Association of Universities for Research in Astronomy (AURA)	JPL · 19912
19913 Aigyptios	1973 SU_{1}	Aigyptios, father of the hero Antiphos, a companion of Odysseus	JPL · 19913
19914 Klagenfurt	1973 UK_{5}	Klagenfurt, Kaernten, Austria	JPL · 19914
19915 Bochkarev	1974 RX_{1}	Nikolay Gennadievich Bochkarev (born 1947), Russian astronomer	JPL · 19915
19916 Donbass	1976 QH_{1}	The Donetskij coal basin is located mainly in Ukraine and partly in Russia.	JPL · 19916
19917 Dazaifu	1977 EE_{8}	The Dazaifu government office was in charge of the Kyushu area and the two islands of Iki and Tsushima in the second half of the 7th century. It was a base of defense and diplomatic relations at that time. The corner stones of the remains of the capital towers 'tofuro' remain in Dazaifu city.	JPL · 19917
19918 Stavby	1977 PB	Stavby is a small village outside Uppsala. Stavby's church was started in the mid–13th century and there are still extant frescoes from the 1490s on its walls and vault.	IAU · 19918
19919 Pogorelov	1977 TQ_{6}	Aleksey Vasil'evich Pogorelov (1919–2002), a Ukrainian Soviet mathematician, was responsible for the solution of a number of key problems in geometry "as a whole", in the fundamentals of geometry, in the theory of the Monge-Ampère equation and in the geometrical theory of thin elastic shells	JPL · 19919
19925 Juni	1979 QD_{3}	Juni Lagerkvist, granddaughter of the discoverer.	IAU · 19925
19927 Rogefeldt	1980 FM_{4}	Pugh Rogefeldt (b. 1947) is the stage name of Anders Sture Torbjörn Rogefeldt, a Swedish singer-songwriter and guitarist.	IAU · 19927
19952 Ashkinazi	1982 UV_{6}	Alexey Alexandrovich Ashkinazi (born 1949) is deputy director for capital construction at CrAO. For 39 years he was engaged in the construction and repair of the Observatory's telescopes and residential buildings, as well as the construction of communication lines to the outside world	JPL · 19952
19953 Takeo	1982 VU_{2}	Takeo, Saga is a city in Saga prefecture on Kyushu island in Japan, surrounded by mountains.	JPL · 19953
19954 Shigeyoshi	1982 VY_{3}	Shigeyoshi Nabeshima (1800–1862) was the 28th lord of Takeo area, Saga domain in the 19th century. He imported globes and astronomical telescopes, and introduced foreign studies including astronomy. He is respected as a local hero, called Shigeyoshi-kou in Takeo.	JPL · 19954
19955 Hollý	1984 WZ_{1}	Ján Hollý, Slovak poet, translator, and catholic priest †	MPC · 19955
19959 Daisy	1985 UJ_{3}	Daisy Lagerkvist, granddaughter of the discoverer.	IAU · 19959
19962 Martynenko	1986 RV_{5}	Vasily Vasil'evich Martynenko (1930–2000) was a researcher of meteor streams, an organizer of annual meteor expeditions and author of many papers and books. He organized an observatory for young amateurs in Simferopol, a studio of space paintings and a mineralogical museum	JPL · 19962
19968 Palazzolascaris	1988 FE_{3}	"Palazzo Lascaris" the historical home of Council of the Piedmont Region, which has promoted the culture of science, scientific knowledge, research and teaching, notably the development of initiatives with the Astrophysical Observatory of Turin.	JPL · 19968
19969 Davidfreedman	1988 PR	David A. Freedman (1938–2008), American statistician, 2003 recipient of the National Academy of Sciences' Carty Award	JPL · 19969
19970 Johannpeter	1988 RJ_{3}	Johann Peter Hebel (1760–1826), German evangelical theologian and author of Allemannische Gedichte and Schatzkästlein des rheinischen Hausfreundes	JPL · 19970
19980 Barrysimon	1989 WF_{2}	Barry Simon (born 1952), a first-rate amateur astronomer, founded the Deep South Regional Stargaze in 1983 and has managed it since then.	JPL · 19980
19981 Bialystock	1989 YB_{6}	Białystok, Poland	JPL · 19981
19982 Barbaradoore	1990 BJ	Barbara Hendricks Doore (born 1933) is a cousin of the discoverer.	JPL · 19982
19983 Inagekiyokazu	1990 DW	Kiyokazu Inage (born 1950) is a Japanese amateur astronomer and popularizer of astronomy in Kagawa Prefecture. His main interests are nebulae, star clusters, solar eclipses and deep space observations, and he is well known for his beautiful stellar photographs.	JPL · 19983
19992 Schönbein	1990 TS_{9}	Christian Friedrich Schönbein, German chemist †	MPC · 19992
19993 Günterseeber	1990 TK_{10}	Günter Seeber (born 1941), a German geodesist	JPL · 19993
19994 Tresini	1990 TJ_{15}	Domenico Trezzini (c. 1670–1734), a Swiss architect and engineer, who worked in St. Petersburg, Russia, beginning in 1703 and is regarded as the city's first architect. He built the Peter and Paul fortress, the Summer Palace of Peter I and the House of 12 Boards, which now houses St. Petersburg University.	JPL · 19994
19998 Binoche	1990 WP_{1}	Juliette Binoche (born 1964) became world-famous for her performance in The Unbearable Lightness of Being (1988), a movie based on Milan Kundera's novel (1984)	JPL · 19998
19999 Depardieu	1991 BJ_{1}	Gérard Depardieu (born 1948) and his son Guillaume Depardieu (1971–2008). French actors.	JPL · 19999
20000 Varuna	2000 WR_{106}	Varuna is one of the oldest of the vedic deities, the maker and upholder of heaven and earth. As such he is king of gods and men and the universe, and he has unlimited knowledge.	JPL · 20000

back to top

Preceded by 18,001–19,000	Meanings of minor-planet names List of minor planets: 19,001–20,000	Succeeded by 20,001–21,000
