= 21062 Iasky =

Main-belt asteroid

Discovery
- Discovered by: C. Shoemaker; E. Shoemaker
- Discovery site: Palomar Obs.
- Discovery date: 13 May 1991

Designations
- Named after: Robert Iasky (Australian geophysicist)
- Alternative designations: 1991 JW_{1} · 1990 EO_{9} 2000 AE_{168}
- Minor planet category: main-belt · (outer) background

Orbital characteristics
- Epoch 27 April 2019 (JD 2458600.5)
- Uncertainty parameter 0
- Observation arc: 35.85 yr (13,093 d)
- Aphelion: 3.1471 AU
- Perihelion: 2.9420 AU
- Semi-major axis: 3.0445 AU
- Eccentricity: 0.0337
- Orbital period (sidereal): 5.31 yr (1,940 d)
- Mean anomaly: 316.99°
- Mean motion: 0° 11^{m} 7.8^{s} / day
- Inclination: 23.571°
- Longitude of ascending node: 149.18°
- Argument of perihelion: 221.51°

Physical characteristics
- Mean diameter: 19.034±0.210 km
- Geometric albedo: 0.063±0.004
- Absolute magnitude (H): 12.4

21062 Iasky (provisional designation 1991 JW_{1}) is a dark background asteroid from the outer regions of the asteroid belt, approximately 19 kilometers (12 miles) in diameter. It was discovered on 13 May 1991, by American astronomers Carolyn and Eugene Shoemaker at the Palomar Observatory in California. It was named for Australian geophysicist Robert Iasky.

== Orbit and classification ==
Iasky is a non-family asteroid from the main belt's background population. It orbits the Sun in the outer asteroid belt at a distance of 2.9–3.1 AU once every 5 years and 4 months (1,940 days; semi-major axis of 3.04 AU). Its orbit has an eccentricity of 0.03 and an inclination of 24° with respect to the ecliptic. The body's observation arc begins in November 1982, with its first observations taken by the Siding Spring Observatory and published with the Digitized Sky Survey later on.

== Naming ==
This minor planet was named after Australian geophysicist Robert Iasky (born 1956), who discovered the 120-kilometer-sized Woodleigh crater in the Carnarvon Basin of Western Australia while working with the Geological Survey of Western Australia. The official naming citation was published by the Minor Planet Center on 1 May 2003 (M.P.C. 48396).

== Physical characteristics ==
According to the survey carried out by the NEOWISE mission of NASA's Wide-field Infrared Survey Explorer, Iasky measures 19.034 kilometers in diameter and its surface has an albedo of 0.063, which is typical for a carbonaceous C-type asteroid. As of 2018, no rotational lightcurve of Iasky has been obtained from photometric observations. The body's rotation period, pole and shape remain unknown.
