= 21509 Lucascavin =

Main-belt asteroid

Discovery
- Discovered by: LINEAR
- Discovery site: Lincoln Lab's ETS
- Discovery date: 22 May 1998

Designations
- Named after: Lucas James Cavin (2005 ISEF awardee)
- Alternative designations: 1998 KL_{35} · 1982 VD_{3}
- Minor planet category: main-belt · (inner); Lucascavin · Flora; Baptistina · Duponta

Orbital characteristics
- Epoch 27 April 2019 (JD 2458600.5)
- Uncertainty parameter 0
- Observation arc: 35.44 yr (12,944 d)
- Aphelion: 2.5369 AU
- Perihelion: 2.0276 AU
- Semi-major axis: 2.2822 AU
- Eccentricity: 0.1116
- Orbital period (sidereal): 3.45 yr (1,259 d)
- Mean anomaly: 189.97°
- Mean motion: 0° 17^{m} 9.24^{s} / day
- Inclination: 5.9813°
- Longitude of ascending node: 70.168°
- Argument of perihelion: 4.4723°

Physical characteristics
- Mean diameter: 2.54 km (calculated)
- Synodic rotation period: 5.784±0.004 h
- Geometric albedo: 0.24 (assumed)
- Spectral type: S (assumed); V–R = 0.474±0.016
- Absolute magnitude (H): 14.68±0.07 (R); 14.9

21509 Lucascavin (provisional designation 1998 KL_{35}) is a small asteroid from the inner regions of the asteroid belt, approximately 2.5 kilometers (1.6 miles) in diameter. It is the namesake of the tiny Lucascavin family located within the Flora clan. It was discovered on 22 May 1998, by astronomers with the Lincoln Near-Earth Asteroid Research at the Lincoln Laboratory's Experimental Test Site near Socorro, New Mexico. The presumed S-type asteroid has a rotation period of 5.8 hours. It was named for the 2005-ISEF awardee Lucas James Cavin.

== Orbit and classification ==
According to a HCM-analysis by David Nesvorný, Lucascavin is the namesake of the Lucascavin family (412), a tight, young cluster between 200 and 800 thousand years old, which consists of 3 known asteroids only – the others are (180255) and (209570). The cluster in turn belongs to the encompassing Baptistina family (403) within the larger Florian region (402). Since other astronomers have ruled out the existence of a Flora family in the first place, Lucascavin has also been grouped to the alternative Duponta family, a core group inside the Florian region.

Lucascavin orbits the Sun in the inner asteroid belt at a distance of 2.0–2.5 AU once every 3 years and 5 months (1,259 days; semi-major axis of 2.28 AU). Its orbit has an eccentricity of 0.11 and an inclination of 6° with respect to the ecliptic. The body's observation arc begins with its first observation as 1982 VD_{3} at Kiso Observatory in November 1982, more than 15 years prior to its official discovery observation.

== Naming ==
This minor planet was named after Lucas James Cavin (born 1986) who won the second place in the 2005 Intel International Science and Engineering Fair for his engineering project. The official naming citation was published by the Minor Planet Center on 22 August 2005 (M.P.C. 54702). At the time he attended the Chillico High School in Missouri, United States.

== Physical characteristics ==
Lucascavin is an assumed S-type asteroid, in agreement with the overall spectral type of the Lucascavin, Baptistina and Flora family groupings.

=== Rotation period ===
Between 2006 and 2016, several rotational lightcurves of Lucascavin have been obtained from photometric observations by Czech astronomer Petr Pravec. Best-rated lightcurve analysis from 2013 gave a rotation period of 5.784±0.004 hours with a consolidated brightness amplitude between 0.23 and 0.30 magnitude (U=2/3/3-). Pravec also determined a low V–R color index of 0.474.

=== Diameter and albedo ===
The Collaborative Asteroid Lightcurve Link assumes an albedo of 0.24 – derived from 8 Flora the namesake of the Flora clan – and calculates a diameter of 2.54 kilometers based on an absolute magnitude of 15.14.
