= Quirico Filopanti =

Italian mathematician and politician (1812–1894)

Giuseppe Barilli
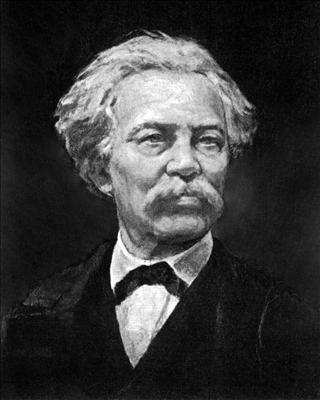
- Born: 20 April 1812; Budrio, Italy
- Died: 18 December 1894 (aged 82); Bologna, Italy
- Scientific career
- Fields: Mathematics

Giuseppe Barilli (20 April 1812 – 18 December 1894), also known by his pseudonym Quirico Filopanti, was an Italian mathematician and politician.

== Biography ==
Barilli was born in Budrio, near Bologna, Italy, on 20 April 1812. He graduated in 1834 in mathematics and became professor of mechanics and hydraulics in 1848.

He participated in the political affairs of Italian unification, and during 1849 participated in the establishment of the Roman Republic. He was appointed secretary of the Assemblea Costituente (constituent assembly) and was the author of the Decreto Fondamentale ("Fundamental Decree"), which on 9 February 1849 declared the temporal government of the Pope forfeited and proclaimed the Republic.

After the end of the Republic, he found shelter in the United States and afterwards in London, United Kingdom. Even after the formation of the Kingdom of Italy and his return to Italy, he ended his appointment as teacher of mechanics at the University of Bologna since he refused repeatedly to take his oath of allegiance to the monarchy. In 1876 he was elected as a member of the Parliament for the Republican Party. He died poor in Bologna in 1894.

In his work Miranda in 1858, he develops the idea of time zones. Filopanti's hypothesis was to ideally divide the Earth's surface into 24 areas (zones) along the lines of the meridians, each of which should have its own time. Each time zone should differ from the next by one hour, whereas minutes and seconds should coincide within each zone. The first time zone should be centred on Rome's meridian. The division into time zones should establish the local time (L). His hypothesis also provided for the establishment of a universal time (U) that should be used as the only datum line in astronomy and telegraph communications.

== Filopanti as paradoxer ==
Filopanti authored several books with peculiar titles, such as Cesar at the Rubicon (1847), On the Uses of Canvas in Hydraulics (1866), God Exists (1881), God is a Liberal (1880), Synopsis of the Geouranian Theory, or On Some Singular Relations Between the Earth and the Sky (1862). His book Miranda. A Book Divided Into Three Parts, Entitled Souls, Numbers, Stars, on the Neo-Christian Religion, London, 1858, was listed by Augustus De Morgan in his A Budget of Paradoxes.
