= Intel Foundation Achievement Award =

Scholarship in the United States

The Intel Foundation Achievement Awards are US$5,000 scholarships presented to high school students in recognition of their achievements in the scientific disciplines. Up to 15 are awarded, on selection by a panel of judges, each year at the Intel International Science and Engineering Fair (ISEF).
