= List of minor planets: 19001–20000 =

The following is a partial list of minor planets, running from minor-planet number 19001 through 20000, inclusive. The primary data for this and other partial lists is based on JPL's "Small-Body Orbital Elements" and data available from the Minor Planet Center. Critical list information is also provided by the MPC, unless otherwise specified from Lowell Observatory. A detailed description of the table's columns and additional sources are given on the main page including a complete list of every page in this series, and a statistical break-up on the dynamical classification of minor planets.

Also see the summary list of all named bodies in numerical and alphabetical order, and the corresponding naming citations for the number range of this particular list. New namings may only be added to this list after official publication, as the preannouncement of names is condemned by the Working Group for Small Bodies Nomenclature of the International Astronomical Union.

Near-Earth obj.	MBA (inner)	MBA (outer)	Centaur
Mars-crosser	MBA (middle)	Jupiter trojan	Trans-Neptunian obj.
Unclassified

== 19001–19100 ==
Designation			Discovery			Properties		Ref
Permanent	Provisional	Named after	Date	Site	Discoverer(s)	Category	Diam.	Ref
19001	2000 RV_{60}	—	September 6, 2000	Socorro	LINEAR	·	7.4 km	MPC; JPL
19002 Tongkexue	2000 RD_{61}	Tongkexue	September 1, 2000	Socorro	LINEAR	V	2.9 km	MPC; JPL
19003 Erinfrey	2000 RL_{61}	Erinfrey	September 1, 2000	Socorro	LINEAR	AGN	4.7 km	MPC; JPL
19004 Chirayath	2000 RU_{62}	Chirayath	September 2, 2000	Socorro	LINEAR	·	1.8 km	MPC; JPL
19005 Teckman	2000 RY_{64}	Teckman	September 1, 2000	Socorro	LINEAR	KOR	4.5 km	MPC; JPL
19006	2000 RY_{65}	—	September 1, 2000	Socorro	LINEAR	ADE	11 km	MPC; JPL
19007 Nirajnathan	2000 RD_{68}	Nirajnathan	September 2, 2000	Socorro	LINEAR	(1338) (FLO)	2.4 km	MPC; JPL
19008 Kristibutler	2000 RV_{70}	Kristibutler	September 2, 2000	Socorro	LINEAR	KOR	5.4 km	MPC; JPL
19009 Galenmaly	2000 RF_{72}	Galenmaly	September 2, 2000	Socorro	LINEAR	·	8.8 km	MPC; JPL
19010	2000 RT_{72}	—	September 2, 2000	Socorro	LINEAR	·	13 km	MPC; JPL
19011	2000 RU_{75}	—	September 3, 2000	Socorro	LINEAR	H	2.5 km	MPC; JPL
19012	2000 RZ_{75}	—	September 3, 2000	Socorro	LINEAR	EUN	4.6 km	MPC; JPL
19013	2000 RN_{76}	—	September 4, 2000	Socorro	LINEAR	RAF	4.8 km	MPC; JPL
19014	2000 RW_{77}	—	September 9, 2000	Višnjan Observatory	K. Korlević	AGN	3.8 km	MPC; JPL
19015	2000 RX_{77}	—	September 9, 2000	Višnjan Observatory	K. Korlević	GEF	5.6 km	MPC; JPL
19016	2000 RY_{78}	—	September 11, 2000	Črni Vrh	Mikuž, H.	·	7.7 km	MPC; JPL
19017 Susanlederer	2000 RH_{93}	Susanlederer	September 4, 2000	Anderson Mesa	LONEOS	KOR	3.4 km	MPC; JPL
19018	2000 RL_{100}	—	September 5, 2000	Anderson Mesa	LONEOS	L5	32 km	MPC; JPL
19019 Sunflower	2000 SB	Sunflower	September 17, 2000	Olathe	Robinson, L.	(5)	3.0 km	MPC; JPL
19020	2000 SC_{6}	—	September 20, 2000	Socorro	LINEAR	L5	43 km	MPC; JPL
19021	2000 SC_{8}	—	September 20, 2000	Socorro	LINEAR	T_{j} (2.88)	9.2 km	MPC; JPL
19022 Penzel	2000 SR_{44}	Penzel	September 26, 2000	Drebach	G. Lehmann	·	5.2 km	MPC; JPL
19023 Varela	2000 SH_{111}	Varela	September 24, 2000	Socorro	LINEAR	MIS	6.4 km	MPC; JPL
19024	2000 SS_{112}	—	September 24, 2000	Socorro	LINEAR	·	9.8 km	MPC; JPL
19025 Arthurpetron	2000 SC_{117}	Arthurpetron	September 24, 2000	Socorro	LINEAR	V	2.7 km	MPC; JPL
19026	2000 SR_{145}	—	September 24, 2000	Socorro	LINEAR	·	11 km	MPC; JPL
19027	2000 SZ_{149}	—	September 24, 2000	Socorro	LINEAR	EOS	6.2 km	MPC; JPL
19028	2000 SC_{165}	—	September 23, 2000	Socorro	LINEAR	·	21 km	MPC; JPL
19029 Briede	2000 SR_{205}	Briede	September 24, 2000	Socorro	LINEAR	NYS	4.2 km	MPC; JPL
19030	2000 SJ_{276}	—	September 30, 2000	Socorro	LINEAR	·	13 km	MPC; JPL
19031	2000 SU_{295}	—	September 27, 2000	Socorro	LINEAR	·	6.5 km	MPC; JPL
19032	2053 P-L	—	September 24, 1960	Palomar	C. J. van Houten, I. van Houten-Groeneveld, T. Gehrels	LEO	8.5 km	MPC; JPL
19033	2157 P-L	—	September 24, 1960	Palomar	C. J. van Houten, I. van Houten-Groeneveld, T. Gehrels	·	11 km	MPC; JPL
19034 Santorini	2554 P-L	Santorini	September 24, 1960	Palomar	C. J. van Houten, I. van Houten-Groeneveld, T. Gehrels	3:2 · SHU · slow	20 km	MPC; JPL
19035	4634 P-L	—	September 24, 1960	Palomar	C. J. van Houten, I. van Houten-Groeneveld, T. Gehrels	·	3.0 km	MPC; JPL
19036	4642 P-L	—	September 24, 1960	Palomar	C. J. van Houten, I. van Houten-Groeneveld, T. Gehrels	·	2.0 km	MPC; JPL
19037	4663 P-L	—	September 24, 1960	Palomar	C. J. van Houten, I. van Houten-Groeneveld, T. Gehrels	NYS	2.3 km	MPC; JPL
19038	4764 P-L	—	September 24, 1960	Palomar	C. J. van Houten, I. van Houten-Groeneveld, T. Gehrels	·	6.4 km	MPC; JPL
19039	4844 P-L	—	September 24, 1960	Palomar	C. J. van Houten, I. van Houten-Groeneveld, T. Gehrels	·	1.8 km	MPC; JPL
19040	4875 P-L	—	September 26, 1960	Palomar	C. J. van Houten, I. van Houten-Groeneveld, T. Gehrels	NYS	3.9 km	MPC; JPL
19041	6055 P-L	—	September 24, 1960	Palomar	C. J. van Houten, I. van Houten-Groeneveld, T. Gehrels	·	2.5 km	MPC; JPL
19042	6104 P-L	—	September 24, 1960	Palomar	C. J. van Houten, I. van Houten-Groeneveld, T. Gehrels	·	9.0 km	MPC; JPL
19043	6214 P-L	—	September 24, 1960	Palomar	C. J. van Houten, I. van Houten-Groeneveld, T. Gehrels	·	3.5 km	MPC; JPL
19044	6516 P-L	—	September 24, 1960	Palomar	C. J. van Houten, I. van Houten-Groeneveld, T. Gehrels	·	1.8 km	MPC; JPL
19045	6593 P-L	—	September 24, 1960	Palomar	C. J. van Houten, I. van Houten-Groeneveld, T. Gehrels	·	2.8 km	MPC; JPL
19046	7607 P-L	—	October 17, 1960	Palomar	C. J. van Houten, I. van Houten-Groeneveld, T. Gehrels	·	2.8 km	MPC; JPL
19047	9516 P-L	—	October 22, 1960	Palomar	C. J. van Houten, I. van Houten-Groeneveld, T. Gehrels	·	2.0 km	MPC; JPL
19048	9567 P-L	—	October 17, 1960	Palomar	C. J. van Houten, I. van Houten-Groeneveld, T. Gehrels	VER	8.8 km	MPC; JPL
19049	1105 T-1	—	March 25, 1971	Palomar	C. J. van Houten, I. van Houten-Groeneveld, T. Gehrels	·	4.2 km	MPC; JPL
19050	1162 T-1	—	March 25, 1971	Palomar	C. J. van Houten, I. van Houten-Groeneveld, T. Gehrels	EOS	4.7 km	MPC; JPL
19051	3210 T-1	—	March 26, 1971	Palomar	C. J. van Houten, I. van Houten-Groeneveld, T. Gehrels	·	3.3 km	MPC; JPL
19052	1017 T-2	—	September 29, 1973	Palomar	C. J. van Houten, I. van Houten-Groeneveld, T. Gehrels	·	7.0 km	MPC; JPL
19053	1054 T-2	—	September 29, 1973	Palomar	C. J. van Houten, I. van Houten-Groeneveld, T. Gehrels	·	9.6 km	MPC; JPL
19054	1058 T-2	—	September 29, 1973	Palomar	C. J. van Houten, I. van Houten-Groeneveld, T. Gehrels	·	8.2 km	MPC; JPL
19055	1066 T-2	—	September 29, 1973	Palomar	C. J. van Houten, I. van Houten-Groeneveld, T. Gehrels	·	4.0 km	MPC; JPL
19056	1162 T-2	—	September 29, 1973	Palomar	C. J. van Houten, I. van Houten-Groeneveld, T. Gehrels	·	4.6 km	MPC; JPL
19057	1166 T-2	—	September 29, 1973	Palomar	C. J. van Houten, I. van Houten-Groeneveld, T. Gehrels	·	2.5 km	MPC; JPL
19058	1331 T-2	—	September 29, 1973	Palomar	C. J. van Houten, I. van Houten-Groeneveld, T. Gehrels	·	3.1 km	MPC; JPL
19059	1352 T-2	—	September 29, 1973	Palomar	C. J. van Houten, I. van Houten-Groeneveld, T. Gehrels	MAS ·	7.6 km	MPC; JPL
19060	2176 T-2	—	September 29, 1973	Palomar	C. J. van Houten, I. van Houten-Groeneveld, T. Gehrels	·	5.1 km	MPC; JPL
19061	2261 T-2	—	September 29, 1973	Palomar	C. J. van Houten, I. van Houten-Groeneveld, T. Gehrels	NYS	4.1 km	MPC; JPL
19062	2289 T-2	—	September 29, 1973	Palomar	C. J. van Houten, I. van Houten-Groeneveld, T. Gehrels	EOS	6.1 km	MPC; JPL
19063	3147 T-2	—	September 30, 1973	Palomar	C. J. van Houten, I. van Houten-Groeneveld, T. Gehrels	fast	8.5 km	MPC; JPL
19064	3176 T-2	—	September 30, 1973	Palomar	C. J. van Houten, I. van Houten-Groeneveld, T. Gehrels	·	4.1 km	MPC; JPL
19065	3351 T-2	—	September 25, 1973	Palomar	C. J. van Houten, I. van Houten-Groeneveld, T. Gehrels	NYS	3.5 km	MPC; JPL
19066 Ellarie	4068 T-2	Ellarie	September 29, 1973	Palomar	C. J. van Houten, I. van Houten-Groeneveld, T. Gehrels	·	2.7 km	MPC; JPL
19067	4087 T-2	—	September 29, 1973	Palomar	C. J. van Houten, I. van Houten-Groeneveld, T. Gehrels	·	4.9 km	MPC; JPL
19068	4232 T-2	—	September 29, 1973	Palomar	C. J. van Houten, I. van Houten-Groeneveld, T. Gehrels	NYS	3.8 km	MPC; JPL
19069	5149 T-2	—	September 25, 1973	Palomar	C. J. van Houten, I. van Houten-Groeneveld, T. Gehrels	EOS	5.3 km	MPC; JPL
19070	5491 T-2	—	September 30, 1973	Palomar	C. J. van Houten, I. van Houten-Groeneveld, T. Gehrels	·	8.3 km	MPC; JPL
19071	1047 T-3	—	October 17, 1977	Palomar	C. J. van Houten, I. van Houten-Groeneveld, T. Gehrels	·	4.1 km	MPC; JPL
19072	1222 T-3	—	October 17, 1977	Palomar	C. J. van Houten, I. van Houten-Groeneveld, T. Gehrels	(1298)	11 km	MPC; JPL
19073	3157 T-3	—	October 16, 1977	Palomar	C. J. van Houten, I. van Houten-Groeneveld, T. Gehrels	·	2.4 km	MPC; JPL
19074	4236 T-3	—	October 16, 1977	Palomar	C. J. van Houten, I. van Houten-Groeneveld, T. Gehrels	HYG	11 km	MPC; JPL
19075	4288 T-3	—	October 16, 1977	Palomar	C. J. van Houten, I. van Houten-Groeneveld, T. Gehrels	NEM	7.1 km	MPC; JPL
19076	5002 T-3	—	October 16, 1977	Palomar	C. J. van Houten, I. van Houten-Groeneveld, T. Gehrels	·	5.8 km	MPC; JPL
19077	5123 T-3	—	October 16, 1977	Palomar	C. J. van Houten, I. van Houten-Groeneveld, T. Gehrels	·	4.4 km	MPC; JPL
19078	5187 T-3	—	October 16, 1977	Palomar	C. J. van Houten, I. van Houten-Groeneveld, T. Gehrels	·	16 km	MPC; JPL
19079 Hernández	1967 KC	Hernández	May 31, 1967	El Leoncito	Félix Aguilar Observatory	·	8.7 km	MPC; JPL
19080 Martínfierro	1970 JB	Martínfierro	May 10, 1970	El Leoncito	Félix Aguilar Observatory	·	5.6 km	MPC; JPL
19081 Mravinskij	1973 SX_{2}	Mravinskij	September 22, 1973	Nauchnij	N. S. Chernykh	MAR	5.8 km	MPC; JPL
19082 Vikchernov	1976 QS	Vikchernov	August 26, 1976	Nauchnij	N. S. Chernykh	·	3.1 km	MPC; JPL
19083 Mizuki	1977 DA_{4}	Mizuki	February 18, 1977	Kiso	H. Kosai, K. Furukawa	KOR	6.8 km	MPC; JPL
19084 Eilestam	1978 RQ_{9}	Eilestam	September 2, 1978	La Silla	C.-I. Lagerkvist	V	3.7 km	MPC; JPL
19085	1978 UR_{4}	—	October 27, 1978	Palomar	C. M. Olmstead	·	2.8 km	MPC; JPL
19086	1978 VB_{3}	—	November 7, 1978	Palomar	E. F. Helin, S. J. Bus	·	14 km	MPC; JPL
19087	1978 VT_{4}	—	November 7, 1978	Palomar	E. F. Helin, S. J. Bus	THM	9.4 km	MPC; JPL
19088	1978 VW_{4}	—	November 7, 1978	Palomar	E. F. Helin, S. J. Bus	MAS	1.7 km	MPC; JPL
19089	1978 VZ_{6}	—	November 7, 1978	Palomar	E. F. Helin, S. J. Bus	·	6.5 km	MPC; JPL
19090	1978 VM_{9}	—	November 7, 1978	Palomar	E. F. Helin, S. J. Bus	·	3.9 km	MPC; JPL
19091 Hagen	1978 XX	Hagen	December 6, 1978	Palomar	E. Bowell, Warnock, A.	EUN	6.9 km	MPC; JPL
19092	1979 MF_{2}	—	June 25, 1979	Siding Spring	E. F. Helin, S. J. Bus	·	2.1 km	MPC; JPL
19093	1979 MM_{3}	—	June 25, 1979	Siding Spring	E. F. Helin, S. J. Bus	·	11 km	MPC; JPL
19094	1979 MR_{6}	—	June 25, 1979	Siding Spring	E. F. Helin, S. J. Bus	·	2.1 km	MPC; JPL
19095	1979 MA_{8}	—	June 25, 1979	Siding Spring	E. F. Helin, S. J. Bus	·	6.7 km	MPC; JPL
19096 Leonfridman	1979 TY_{1}	Leonfridman	October 14, 1979	Nauchnij	N. S. Chernykh	·	4.3 km	MPC; JPL
19097	1981 EY_{2}	—	March 2, 1981	Siding Spring	S. J. Bus	EOS	4.9 km	MPC; JPL
19098	1981 EM_{3}	—	March 2, 1981	Siding Spring	S. J. Bus	V	1.8 km	MPC; JPL
19099	1981 EC_{4}	—	March 2, 1981	Siding Spring	S. J. Bus	·	6.5 km	MPC; JPL
19100	1981 EH_{5}	—	March 2, 1981	Siding Spring	S. J. Bus	·	3.9 km	MPC; JPL

== 19101–19200 ==
back to top

Designation			Discovery			Properties		Ref
Permanent	Provisional	Named after	Date	Site	Discoverer(s)	Category	Diam.	Ref
19101	1981 EV_{6}	—	March 6, 1981	Siding Spring	S. J. Bus	EOS	5.0 km	MPC; JPL
19102	1981 EH_{8}	—	March 1, 1981	Siding Spring	S. J. Bus	·	2.5 km	MPC; JPL
19103	1981 ER_{11}	—	March 7, 1981	Siding Spring	S. J. Bus	·	2.5 km	MPC; JPL
19104	1981 EY_{13}	—	March 1, 1981	Siding Spring	S. J. Bus	·	5.1 km	MPC; JPL
19105	1981 EB_{15}	—	March 1, 1981	Siding Spring	S. J. Bus	(5)	2.8 km	MPC; JPL
19106	1981 EV_{15}	—	March 1, 1981	Siding Spring	S. J. Bus	·	2.7 km	MPC; JPL
19107	1981 EU_{19}	—	March 2, 1981	Siding Spring	S. J. Bus	·	3.1 km	MPC; JPL
19108	1981 EV_{21}	—	March 2, 1981	Siding Spring	S. J. Bus	·	4.0 km	MPC; JPL
19109	1981 EZ_{23}	—	March 7, 1981	Siding Spring	S. J. Bus	·	3.8 km	MPC; JPL
19110	1981 EF_{29}	—	March 1, 1981	Siding Spring	S. J. Bus	HYG	8.2 km	MPC; JPL
19111	1981 EM_{29}	—	March 1, 1981	Siding Spring	S. J. Bus	·	1.9 km	MPC; JPL
19112	1981 EN_{31}	—	March 2, 1981	Siding Spring	S. J. Bus	·	4.5 km	MPC; JPL
19113	1981 EB_{33}	—	March 1, 1981	Siding Spring	S. J. Bus	EUN	3.8 km	MPC; JPL
19114	1981 EP_{37}	—	March 1, 1981	Siding Spring	S. J. Bus	(5)	3.4 km	MPC; JPL
19115	1981 EM_{39}	—	March 2, 1981	Siding Spring	S. J. Bus	·	2.2 km	MPC; JPL
19116	1981 EZ_{40}	—	March 2, 1981	Siding Spring	S. J. Bus	(2076)	3.3 km	MPC; JPL
19117	1981 EL_{41}	—	March 2, 1981	Siding Spring	S. J. Bus	·	4.1 km	MPC; JPL
19118	1981 SD_{2}	—	September 26, 1981	Anderson Mesa	N. G. Thomas	V	4.6 km	MPC; JPL
19119 Dimpna	1981 SG_{3}	Dimpna	September 27, 1981	Nauchnij	L. G. Karachkina	·	5.6 km	MPC; JPL
19120 Doronina	1983 PM_{1}	Doronina	August 6, 1983	Nauchnij	L. G. Karachkina	·	6.9 km	MPC; JPL
19121 Rathnasree	1985 CY_{1}	Rathnasree	February 12, 1985	La Silla	H. Debehogne	·	7.8 km	MPC; JPL
19122 Amandabosh	1985 VF_{1}	Amandabosh	November 7, 1985	Anderson Mesa	E. Bowell	·	4.4 km	MPC; JPL
19123 Stephenlevine	1986 TP_{1}	Stephenlevine	October 7, 1986	Anderson Mesa	E. Bowell	·	2.6 km	MPC; JPL
19124	1986 TH_{3}	—	October 4, 1986	Kleť	A. Mrkos	·	8.6 km	MPC; JPL
19125	1987 CH	—	February 2, 1987	La Silla	E. W. Elst	·	3.1 km	MPC; JPL
19126 Ottohahn	1987 QW	Ottohahn	August 22, 1987	Tautenburg Observatory	F. Börngen	·	4.6 km	MPC; JPL
19127 Olegefremov	1987 QH_{10}	Olegefremov	August 26, 1987	Nauchnij	L. G. Karachkina	·	2.4 km	MPC; JPL
19128	1987 YR_{1}	—	December 17, 1987	La Silla	E. W. Elst, G. Pizarro	·	3.5 km	MPC; JPL
19129 Loos	1988 AL_{1}	Loos	January 10, 1988	Kleť	A. Mrkos	·	11 km	MPC; JPL
19130 Tytgat	1988 CG_{2}	Tytgat	February 11, 1988	La Silla	E. W. Elst	·	6.3 km	MPC; JPL
19131	1988 CY_{3}	—	February 13, 1988	La Silla	E. W. Elst	GEF	4.0 km	MPC; JPL
19132 Le Clézio	1988 CL_{4}	Le Clézio	February 13, 1988	La Silla	E. W. Elst	·	8.1 km	MPC; JPL
19133	1988 PC_{2}	—	August 7, 1988	Kleť	Z. Vávrová	·	7.0 km	MPC; JPL
19134	1988 TQ_{1}	—	October 15, 1988	Gekko	Y. Oshima	·	5.7 km	MPC; JPL
19135 Takashionaka	1988 XQ	Takashionaka	December 3, 1988	Kitami	K. Endate, K. Watanabe	·	5.0 km	MPC; JPL
19136 Strassmann	1989 AZ_{6}	Strassmann	January 10, 1989	Tautenburg Observatory	F. Börngen	(5)	3.9 km	MPC; JPL
19137 Copiapó	1989 CP_{2}	Copiapó	February 4, 1989	La Silla	E. W. Elst	·	4.6 km	MPC; JPL
19138	1989 EJ_{1}	—	March 10, 1989	Toyota	K. Suzuki, T. Furuta	·	3.5 km	MPC; JPL
19139 Apian	1989 GJ_{8}	Apian	April 6, 1989	Tautenburg Observatory	F. Börngen	·	5.6 km	MPC; JPL
19140 Jansmit	1989 RJ_{2}	Jansmit	September 2, 1989	Palomar	C. S. Shoemaker, E. M. Shoemaker	PHO	4.0 km	MPC; JPL
19141 Poelkapelle	1989 SB_{4}	Poelkapelle	September 26, 1989	La Silla	E. W. Elst	fast?	3.0 km	MPC; JPL
19142 Langemarck	1989 SU_{4}	Langemarck	September 26, 1989	La Silla	E. W. Elst	·	2.0 km	MPC; JPL
19143	1989 SA_{10}	—	September 26, 1989	La Silla	H. Debehogne	·	2.4 km	MPC; JPL
19144 Shinichiakiyama	1989 UP_{1}	Shinichiakiyama	October 28, 1989	Kani	Y. Mizuno, T. Furuta	·	5.3 km	MPC; JPL
19145	1989 YC	—	December 25, 1989	Chions	J. M. Baur	·	7.9 km	MPC; JPL
19146	1989 YY	—	December 30, 1989	Siding Spring	R. H. McNaught	NYS	4.0 km	MPC; JPL
19147	1989 YV_{4}	—	December 30, 1989	Siding Spring	R. H. McNaught	·	3.8 km	MPC; JPL
19148 Alaska	1989 YA_{5}	Alaska	December 28, 1989	Haute Provence	E. W. Elst	·	11 km	MPC; JPL
19149 Boccaccio	1990 EZ_{2}	Boccaccio	March 2, 1990	La Silla	E. W. Elst	CYB	15 km	MPC; JPL
19150	1990 HY	—	April 26, 1990	Palomar	E. F. Helin	MAR	6.1 km	MPC; JPL
19151	1990 KD_{1}	—	May 20, 1990	Siding Spring	R. H. McNaught	·	4.5 km	MPC; JPL
19152	1990 OB_{5}	—	July 27, 1990	Palomar	H. E. Holt	EUN	5.1 km	MPC; JPL
19153	1990 QB_{3}	—	August 28, 1990	Palomar	H. E. Holt	·	2.3 km	MPC; JPL
19154	1990 QX_{4}	—	August 24, 1990	Palomar	H. E. Holt	·	2.7 km	MPC; JPL
19155 Lifeson	1990 SX_{3}	Lifeson	September 22, 1990	Palomar	B. Roman	EUN	5.9 km	MPC; JPL
19156 Heco	1990 SE_{4}	Heco	September 20, 1990	Geisei	T. Seki	·	5.8 km	MPC; JPL
19157	1990 SS_{6}	—	September 22, 1990	La Silla	E. W. Elst	·	3.1 km	MPC; JPL
19158	1990 SN_{7}	—	September 22, 1990	La Silla	E. W. Elst	·	3.4 km	MPC; JPL
19159 Taenakano	1990 TT	Taenakano	October 10, 1990	Kitami	K. Endate, K. Watanabe	·	6.7 km	MPC; JPL
19160 Chikayoshitomi	1990 TC_{1}	Chikayoshitomi	October 15, 1990	Kitami	K. Endate, K. Watanabe	·	2.9 km	MPC; JPL
19161 Sakawa	1990 TQ_{1}	Sakawa	October 15, 1990	Geisei	T. Seki	·	2.5 km	MPC; JPL
19162 Wambsganss	1990 TZ_{1}	Wambsganss	October 10, 1990	Tautenburg Observatory	L. D. Schmadel, F. Börngen	·	5.8 km	MPC; JPL
19163	1990 WE_{5}	—	November 16, 1990	La Silla	E. W. Elst	·	1.8 km	MPC; JPL
19164	1991 AU_{1}	—	January 12, 1991	Palomar	E. F. Helin	H	3.4 km	MPC; JPL
19165 Nariyuki	1991 CD	Nariyuki	February 4, 1991	Kitami	K. Endate, K. Watanabe	·	3.5 km	MPC; JPL
19166	1991 EY_{1}	—	March 7, 1991	La Silla	H. Debehogne	·	2.9 km	MPC; JPL
19167	1991 ED_{2}	—	March 9, 1991	La Silla	H. Debehogne	·	4.1 km	MPC; JPL
19168	1991 EO_{5}	—	March 14, 1991	La Silla	H. Debehogne	EOS	7.8 km	MPC; JPL
19169	1991 FD	—	March 17, 1991	Palomar	E. F. Helin	PHO	3.3 km	MPC; JPL
19170	1991 FH	—	March 18, 1991	Siding Spring	R. H. McNaught	·	13 km	MPC; JPL
19171	1991 FS	—	March 17, 1991	Fujieda	Shiozawa, H., M. Kizawa	·	3.1 km	MPC; JPL
19172	1991 FC_{4}	—	March 22, 1991	La Silla	H. Debehogne	·	5.9 km	MPC; JPL
19173 Virginiaterése	1991 GE_{2}	Virginiaterése	April 15, 1991	Palomar	C. S. Shoemaker, E. M. Shoemaker	PHO	8.4 km	MPC; JPL
19174	1991 NS_{6}	—	July 11, 1991	La Silla	H. Debehogne	·	6.2 km	MPC; JPL
19175 Peterpiot	1991 PP_{2}	Peterpiot	August 2, 1991	La Silla	E. W. Elst	·	3.7 km	MPC; JPL
19176	1991 PK_{3}	—	August 2, 1991	La Silla	E. W. Elst	·	4.7 km	MPC; JPL
19177	1991 PJ_{11}	—	August 9, 1991	Palomar	H. E. Holt	(5)	4.7 km	MPC; JPL
19178 Walterbothe	1991 RV_{2}	Walterbothe	September 9, 1991	Tautenburg Observatory	F. Börngen, L. D. Schmadel	slow	4.8 km	MPC; JPL
19179	1991 RK_{8}	—	September 12, 1991	Palomar	H. E. Holt	·	6.0 km	MPC; JPL
19180	1991 RK_{16}	—	September 15, 1991	Palomar	H. E. Holt	·	3.7 km	MPC; JPL
19181	1991 SD_{1}	—	September 30, 1991	Siding Spring	R. H. McNaught	EUN	4.6 km	MPC; JPL
19182 Pitz	1991 TX_{2}	Pitz	October 7, 1991	Tautenburg Observatory	L. D. Schmadel, F. Börngen	·	2.7 km	MPC; JPL
19183 Amati	1991 TB_{5}	Amati	October 5, 1991	Tautenburg Observatory	F. Börngen, L. D. Schmadel	EUN	3.8 km	MPC; JPL
19184	1991 TB_{6}	—	October 6, 1991	Kleť	A. Mrkos	·	6.7 km	MPC; JPL
19185 Guarneri	1991 TL_{13}	Guarneri	October 4, 1991	Tautenburg Observatory	F. Börngen	fast?	3.4 km	MPC; JPL
19186	1991 VY_{1}	—	November 5, 1991	Palomar	E. F. Helin	·	6.1 km	MPC; JPL
19187	1991 VU_{2}	—	November 4, 1991	Kiyosato	S. Otomo	ADE	8.4 km	MPC; JPL
19188 Dittebesard	1991 YT	Dittebesard	December 30, 1991	Haute Provence	E. W. Elst	EUN	5.0 km	MPC; JPL
19189 Stradivari	1991 YE_{1}	Stradivari	December 28, 1991	Tautenburg Observatory	F. Börngen	EUN	5.5 km	MPC; JPL
19190 Morihiroshi	1992 AM_{1}	Morihiroshi	January 10, 1992	Okutama	Hioki, T., Hayakawa, S.	PAD	12 km	MPC; JPL
19191	1992 DT_{2}	—	February 23, 1992	Kitt Peak	Spacewatch	KOR	3.7 km	MPC; JPL
19192	1992 DY_{5}	—	February 29, 1992	La Silla	UESAC	KOR	5.5 km	MPC; JPL
19193	1992 DK_{6}	—	February 29, 1992	La Silla	UESAC	KOR	5.3 km	MPC; JPL
19194	1992 DG_{7}	—	February 29, 1992	La Silla	UESAC	·	7.8 km	MPC; JPL
19195	1992 DM_{7}	—	February 29, 1992	La Silla	UESAC	KOR	5.7 km	MPC; JPL
19196	1992 DQ_{7}	—	February 29, 1992	La Silla	UESAC	·	3.6 km	MPC; JPL
19197 Akasaki	1992 EO	Akasaki	March 6, 1992	Geisei	T. Seki	·	14 km	MPC; JPL
19198	1992 ED_{8}	—	March 2, 1992	La Silla	UESAC	KOR	5.1 km	MPC; JPL
19199	1992 FL_{3}	—	March 26, 1992	Kitt Peak	Spacewatch	·	8.1 km	MPC; JPL
19200	1992 GU_{2}	—	April 4, 1992	La Silla	E. W. Elst	EOS	6.9 km	MPC; JPL

== 19201–19300 ==
back to top

Designation			Discovery			Properties		Ref
Permanent	Provisional	Named after	Date	Site	Discoverer(s)	Category	Diam.	Ref
19201	1992 GZ_{4}	—	April 4, 1992	La Silla	E. W. Elst	·	13 km	MPC; JPL
19202	1992 HN	—	April 29, 1992	Kitt Peak	Spacewatch	·	3.2 km	MPC; JPL
19203	1992 HJ_{2}	—	April 27, 1992	Kitt Peak	Spacewatch	V	2.2 km	MPC; JPL
19204 Joshuatree	1992 ME	Joshuatree	June 21, 1992	Palomar	J. E. Mueller	slow	4.6 km	MPC; JPL
19205	1992 PT	—	August 8, 1992	Caussols	E. W. Elst	MAS	2.5 km	MPC; JPL
19206	1992 PH_{4}	—	August 2, 1992	Palomar	H. E. Holt	NYS	3.4 km	MPC; JPL
19207	1992 QS_{1}	—	August 24, 1992	Palomar	H. E. Holt	·	7.0 km	MPC; JPL
19208 Starrfield	1992 RW	Starrfield	September 2, 1992	Tautenburg Observatory	L. D. Schmadel, F. Börngen	NYS	4.9 km	MPC; JPL
19209	1992 UW_{2}	—	October 25, 1992	Kiyosato	S. Otomo	·	3.5 km	MPC; JPL
19210 Higayoshihiro	1992 YE_{4}	Higayoshihiro	December 25, 1992	Geisei	T. Seki	·	4.6 km	MPC; JPL
19211	1993 DM	—	February 21, 1993	Kushiro	S. Ueda, H. Kaneda	·	3.8 km	MPC; JPL
19212	1993 FL_{18}	—	March 17, 1993	La Silla	UESAC	·	4.7 km	MPC; JPL
19213	1993 FF_{21}	—	March 21, 1993	La Silla	UESAC	AGN	3.7 km	MPC; JPL
19214	1993 FT_{22}	—	March 21, 1993	La Silla	UESAC	·	8.5 km	MPC; JPL
19215	1993 FS_{29}	—	March 21, 1993	La Silla	UESAC	·	5.1 km	MPC; JPL
19216	1993 FA_{37}	—	March 19, 1993	La Silla	UESAC	·	4.5 km	MPC; JPL
19217	1993 FE_{43}	—	March 19, 1993	La Silla	UESAC	·	4.6 km	MPC; JPL
19218	1993 FH_{49}	—	March 19, 1993	La Silla	UESAC	KOR	4.4 km	MPC; JPL
19219	1993 OH_{5}	—	July 20, 1993	La Silla	E. W. Elst	·	10 km	MPC; JPL
19220	1993 OX_{11}	—	July 19, 1993	La Silla	E. W. Elst	·	9.0 km	MPC; JPL
19221	1993 PD_{3}	—	August 14, 1993	Caussols	E. W. Elst	·	3.5 km	MPC; JPL
19222	1993 QK_{1}	—	August 16, 1993	Caussols	E. W. Elst	·	7.2 km	MPC; JPL
19223	1993 QH_{8}	—	August 20, 1993	La Silla	E. W. Elst	THM	9.2 km	MPC; JPL
19224 Orosei	1993 RJ_{3}	Orosei	September 15, 1993	Cima Ekar	A. Boattini	·	2.2 km	MPC; JPL
19225	1993 RX_{5}	—	September 15, 1993	La Silla	E. W. Elst	·	3.8 km	MPC; JPL
19226 Peiresc	1993 RA_{8}	Peiresc	September 15, 1993	La Silla	E. W. Elst	CYB	13 km	MPC; JPL
19227	1993 RH_{16}	—	September 15, 1993	La Silla	H. Debehogne, E. W. Elst	·	2.9 km	MPC; JPL
19228 Uemuraikuo	1993 SN_{1}	Uemuraikuo	September 16, 1993	Kitami	K. Endate, K. Watanabe	·	2.7 km	MPC; JPL
19229	1993 SD_{5}	—	September 19, 1993	Caussols	E. W. Elst	·	3.9 km	MPC; JPL
19230 Sugazi	1993 TU	Sugazi	October 11, 1993	Kitami	K. Endate, K. Watanabe	·	4.4 km	MPC; JPL
19231	1993 TL_{5}	—	October 9, 1993	Kitt Peak	Spacewatch	·	1.9 km	MPC; JPL
19232	1993 TJ_{15}	—	October 9, 1993	La Silla	E. W. Elst	·	1.9 km	MPC; JPL
19233	1993 UD_{7}	—	October 20, 1993	La Silla	E. W. Elst	·	2.4 km	MPC; JPL
19234 Victoriahibbs	1993 VC_{1}	Victoriahibbs	November 9, 1993	Palomar	E. F. Helin	PHO	3.3 km	MPC; JPL
19235 van Schurman	1993 VS_{4}	van Schurman	November 9, 1993	Caussols	E. W. Elst	·	11 km	MPC; JPL
19236	1993 XV	—	December 11, 1993	Oizumi	T. Kobayashi	·	3.7 km	MPC; JPL
19237	1994 AP	—	January 4, 1994	Oizumi	T. Kobayashi	·	4.2 km	MPC; JPL
19238	1994 AV_{1}	—	January 9, 1994	Fujieda	Shiozawa, H., T. Urata	·	4.1 km	MPC; JPL
19239	1994 AM_{2}	—	January 7, 1994	Hidaka	Shiozawa, H.	PHO	5.0 km	MPC; JPL
19240	1994 AZ_{10}	—	January 8, 1994	Kitt Peak	Spacewatch	·	2.4 km	MPC; JPL
19241	1994 BH_{4}	—	January 16, 1994	Caussols	E. W. Elst, C. Pollas	·	5.0 km	MPC; JPL
19242	1994 CB_{1}	—	February 3, 1994	Kiyosato	S. Otomo	·	5.5 km	MPC; JPL
19243 Bunting	1994 CD_{9}	Bunting	February 10, 1994	Palomar	C. S. Shoemaker, E. M. Shoemaker	PHO	6.6 km	MPC; JPL
19244	1994 CX_{12}	—	February 7, 1994	La Silla	E. W. Elst	·	6.1 km	MPC; JPL
19245	1994 EL_{2}	—	March 8, 1994	Palomar	E. F. Helin	slow	7.8 km	MPC; JPL
19246 Megumisasaki	1994 EL_{7}	Megumisasaki	March 14, 1994	Nyukasa	M. Hirasawa, S. Suzuki	·	3.3 km	MPC; JPL
19247	1994 LO_{1}	—	June 2, 1994	Kitt Peak	Spacewatch	H	2.3 km	MPC; JPL
19248	1994 PT	—	August 14, 1994	Oizumi	T. Kobayashi	THM	7.7 km	MPC; JPL
19249	1994 PO_{25}	—	August 12, 1994	La Silla	E. W. Elst	KOR	4.4 km	MPC; JPL
19250 Poullain	1994 PF_{26}	Poullain	August 12, 1994	La Silla	E. W. Elst	·	7.7 km	MPC; JPL
19251 Totziens	1994 RY_{1}	Totziens	September 3, 1994	Zimmerwald	P. Wild	·	5.1 km	MPC; JPL
19252	1994 RG_{7}	—	September 12, 1994	Kitt Peak	Spacewatch	·	6.5 km	MPC; JPL
19253	1994 RN_{28}	—	September 5, 1994	La Silla	E. W. Elst	·	4.2 km	MPC; JPL
19254 Shojitomoko	1994 VD_{7}	Shojitomoko	November 11, 1994	Nyukasa	M. Hirasawa, S. Suzuki	·	14 km	MPC; JPL
19255	1994 VK_{8}	—	November 8, 1994	La Palma	A. Fitzsimmons, O'Ceallaigh, D., Williams, I. P.	cubewano (cold)	140 km	MPC; JPL
19256	1994 WA_{4}	—	November 28, 1994	Kushiro	S. Ueda, H. Kaneda	·	6.0 km	MPC; JPL
19257	1995 DS_{5}	—	February 22, 1995	Kitt Peak	Spacewatch	·	3.3 km	MPC; JPL
19258 Gongyi	1995 FT_{20}	Gongyi	March 24, 1995	Xinglong	SCAP	V	3.0 km	MPC; JPL
19259	1995 GB	—	April 1, 1995	Oizumi	T. Kobayashi	NYS	4.9 km	MPC; JPL
19260	1995 GT	—	April 4, 1995	Kiyosato	S. Otomo	PHO	5.0 km	MPC; JPL
19261	1995 MB	—	June 21, 1995	Siding Spring	R. H. McNaught	PHO	7.3 km	MPC; JPL
19262 Lucarubini	1995 OB_{1}	Lucarubini	July 29, 1995	Stroncone	A. Vagnozzi	·	3.9 km	MPC; JPL
19263 Lavater	1995 OH_{10}	Lavater	July 21, 1995	Tautenburg Observatory	F. Börngen	·	7.2 km	MPC; JPL
19264	1995 SE_{10}	—	September 17, 1995	Kitt Peak	Spacewatch	·	3.4 km	MPC; JPL
19265	1995 SD_{24}	—	September 19, 1995	Kitt Peak	Spacewatch	NEM	5.8 km	MPC; JPL
19266	1995 TF_{1}	—	October 14, 1995	Xinglong	SCAP	·	7.3 km	MPC; JPL
19267	1995 TB_{8}	—	October 15, 1995	Kitt Peak	Spacewatch	·	4.8 km	MPC; JPL
19268 Morstadt	1995 UZ	Morstadt	October 21, 1995	Ondřejov	P. Pravec	·	3.3 km	MPC; JPL
19269	1995 UQ_{11}	—	October 17, 1995	Kitt Peak	Spacewatch	MAR	4.6 km	MPC; JPL
19270	1995 VS_{8}	—	November 14, 1995	Kitt Peak	Spacewatch	KOR	4.2 km	MPC; JPL
19271	1995 VG_{13}	—	November 15, 1995	Kitt Peak	Spacewatch	·	4.3 km	MPC; JPL
19272	1995 WO_{15}	—	November 17, 1995	Kitt Peak	Spacewatch	·	4.6 km	MPC; JPL
19273	1995 XJ	—	December 10, 1995	Kleť	Kleť	GEF	3.9 km	MPC; JPL
19274	1995 XA_{1}	—	December 15, 1995	Oizumi	T. Kobayashi	EOS	8.7 km	MPC; JPL
19275	1995 XF_{1}	—	December 15, 1995	Oizumi	T. Kobayashi	·	7.8 km	MPC; JPL
19276	1995 XS_{4}	—	December 14, 1995	Kitt Peak	Spacewatch	·	5.1 km	MPC; JPL
19277	1995 YD	—	December 17, 1995	Oizumi	T. Kobayashi	·	7.0 km	MPC; JPL
19278	1995 YN	—	December 19, 1995	Oizumi	T. Kobayashi	·	9.7 km	MPC; JPL
19279	1995 YC_{4}	—	December 28, 1995	Haleakala	AMOS	CYB	7.3 km	MPC; JPL
19280	1996 AV	—	January 11, 1996	Oizumi	T. Kobayashi	VER	10 km	MPC; JPL
19281	1996 AP_{3}	—	January 14, 1996	Haleakala	AMOS	moon	4.5 km	MPC; JPL
19282 Zhangcunhao	1996 AM_{15}	Zhangcunhao	January 14, 1996	Xinglong	SCAP	THM	8.6 km	MPC; JPL
19283	1996 BJ_{2}	—	January 26, 1996	Oizumi	T. Kobayashi	EOS	7.7 km	MPC; JPL
19284	1996 BU_{3}	—	January 27, 1996	Oizumi	T. Kobayashi	·	8.1 km	MPC; JPL
19285	1996 CM_{9}	—	February 12, 1996	Kushiro	S. Ueda, H. Kaneda	CYB	20 km	MPC; JPL
19286	1996 DU	—	February 19, 1996	Oizumi	T. Kobayashi	·	4.8 km	MPC; JPL
19287 Paronelli	1996 DH_{1}	Paronelli	February 22, 1996	Sormano	M. Cavagna, A. Testa	·	9.9 km	MPC; JPL
19288 Egami	1996 FJ_{5}	Egami	March 20, 1996	Kitami	K. Endate, K. Watanabe	MAR	9.0 km	MPC; JPL
19289	1996 HY_{12}	—	April 17, 1996	La Silla	E. W. Elst	·	3.7 km	MPC; JPL
19290 Schroeder	1996 JR_{1}	Schroeder	May 15, 1996	Haleakala	NEAT	PHO	3.6 km	MPC; JPL
19291 Karelzeman	1996 LF	Karelzeman	June 6, 1996	Ondřejov	P. Pravec, L. Kotková	·	7.4 km	MPC; JPL
19292	1996 NG_{5}	—	July 14, 1996	La Silla	E. W. Elst	·	2.1 km	MPC; JPL
19293 Dedekind	1996 OF	Dedekind	July 18, 1996	Prescott	P. G. Comba	V	1.4 km	MPC; JPL
19294 Weymouth	1996 PF	Weymouth	August 6, 1996	Lime Creek	R. Linderholm	·	2.6 km	MPC; JPL
19295	1996 RC_{1}	—	September 10, 1996	Haleakala	NEAT	·	2.7 km	MPC; JPL
19296	1996 RO_{4}	—	September 13, 1996	Haleakala	NEAT	·	2.6 km	MPC; JPL
19297	1996 RS_{24}	—	September 8, 1996	Kitt Peak	Spacewatch	V	1.8 km	MPC; JPL
19298 Zhongkeda	1996 SU_{4}	Zhongkeda	September 20, 1996	Xinglong	SCAP	V	2.8 km	MPC; JPL
19299	1996 SZ_{4}	—	September 16, 1996	La Palma	A. Fitzsimmons, M. J. Irwin, Williams, I. P.	plutino	100 km	MPC; JPL
19300 Xinglong	1996 SH_{6}	Xinglong	September 18, 1996	Xinglong	SCAP	·	4.3 km	MPC; JPL

== 19301–19400 ==
back to top

Designation			Discovery			Properties		Ref
Permanent	Provisional	Named after	Date	Site	Discoverer(s)	Category	Diam.	Ref
19301	1996 SF_{8}	—	September 21, 1996	Xinglong	SCAP	·	4.8 km	MPC; JPL
19302	1996 TD	—	October 1, 1996	Uppsala	Kamel, L., Lundgren, K.	·	2.6 km	MPC; JPL
19303 Chinacyo	1996 TP_{1}	Chinacyo	October 5, 1996	Kitami	K. Endate, K. Watanabe	·	3.8 km	MPC; JPL
19304 Yoshidaseiko	1996 TQ_{1}	Yoshidaseiko	October 5, 1996	Kitami	K. Endate, K. Watanabe	NYS	3.7 km	MPC; JPL
19305	1996 TH_{10}	—	October 9, 1996	Kushiro	S. Ueda, H. Kaneda	·	3.9 km	MPC; JPL
19306 Voves	1996 TN_{12}	Voves	October 12, 1996	Stroncone	Santa Lucia	NYS	3.7 km	MPC; JPL
19307 Hanayama	1996 TG_{13}	Hanayama	October 14, 1996	Kitami	K. Endate, K. Watanabe	·	3.3 km	MPC; JPL
19308	1996 TO_{66}	—	October 12, 1996	Mauna Kea	C. A. Trujillo, D. C. Jewitt, J. X. Luu	Haumea	409 km	MPC; JPL
19309	1996 UK_{1}	—	October 20, 1996	Kashihara	F. Uto	NYS	3.0 km	MPC; JPL
19310 Osawa	1996 VF_{1}	Osawa	November 4, 1996	Tokyo-Mitaka	Sato, I., Fukushima, H.	·	4.4 km	MPC; JPL
19311 Susantresch	1996 VF_{3}	Susantresch	November 12, 1996	Sudbury	D. di Cicco	·	9.5 km	MPC; JPL
19312	1996 VR_{7}	—	November 15, 1996	Nachi-Katsuura	Y. Shimizu, T. Urata	·	4.0 km	MPC; JPL
19313 Shibatakazunari	1996 VF_{8}	Shibatakazunari	November 6, 1996	Kitami	K. Endate, K. Watanabe	EUN	4.8 km	MPC; JPL
19314 Nakamuratetsu	1996 VT_{8}	Nakamuratetsu	November 7, 1996	Kitami	K. Endate, K. Watanabe	EUN	5.2 km	MPC; JPL
19315 Aizunisshinkan	1996 VY_{8}	Aizunisshinkan	November 7, 1996	Kitami	K. Endate, K. Watanabe	·	3.7 km	MPC; JPL
19316	1996 WB	—	November 16, 1996	Oizumi	T. Kobayashi	EUN	5.3 km	MPC; JPL
19317	1996 WS_{1}	—	November 30, 1996	Oizumi	T. Kobayashi	·	2.8 km	MPC; JPL
19318 Somanah	1996 XB_{2}	Somanah	December 2, 1996	Sormano	F. Manca, M. Cavagna	PHO	4.3 km	MPC; JPL
19319	1996 XX_{2}	—	December 3, 1996	Oizumi	T. Kobayashi	·	3.0 km	MPC; JPL
19320	1996 XB_{6}	—	December 7, 1996	Oizumi	T. Kobayashi	·	3.8 km	MPC; JPL
19321	1996 XY_{7}	—	December 1, 1996	Kitt Peak	Spacewatch	·	5.8 km	MPC; JPL
19322	1996 XQ_{11}	—	December 4, 1996	Kitt Peak	Spacewatch	·	4.9 km	MPC; JPL
19323	1996 XM_{13}	—	December 9, 1996	Sudbury	D. di Cicco	·	3.3 km	MPC; JPL
19324	1996 XA_{18}	—	December 7, 1996	Kitt Peak	Spacewatch	·	3.0 km	MPC; JPL
19325	1996 XC_{18}	—	December 7, 1996	Kitt Peak	Spacewatch	·	4.1 km	MPC; JPL
19326	1996 XD_{19}	—	December 8, 1996	Oizumi	T. Kobayashi	·	4.7 km	MPC; JPL
19327	1996 XH_{19}	—	December 8, 1996	Oizumi	T. Kobayashi	·	12 km	MPC; JPL
19328	1996 XY_{28}	—	December 12, 1996	Kitt Peak	Spacewatch	·	6.7 km	MPC; JPL
19329	1996 XZ_{30}	—	December 14, 1996	Oizumi	T. Kobayashi	V	3.4 km	MPC; JPL
19330	1996 XJ_{31}	—	December 14, 1996	Oizumi	T. Kobayashi	·	4.6 km	MPC; JPL
19331 Stefanovitale	1996 XL_{33}	Stefanovitale	December 4, 1996	Cima Ekar	M. Tombelli, C. Casacci	·	2.7 km	MPC; JPL
19332	1996 YQ_{1}	—	December 18, 1996	Xinglong	SCAP	·	3.8 km	MPC; JPL
19333	1996 YT_{1}	—	December 19, 1996	Xinglong	SCAP	·	5.6 km	MPC; JPL
19334	1996 YV_{1}	—	December 19, 1996	Xinglong	SCAP	MIS	5.7 km	MPC; JPL
19335	1996 YL_{2}	—	December 28, 1996	Oizumi	T. Kobayashi	V	3.2 km	MPC; JPL
19336	1997 AF	—	January 2, 1997	Oizumi	T. Kobayashi	·	5.9 km	MPC; JPL
19337	1997 AT	—	January 2, 1997	Oizumi	T. Kobayashi	·	9.2 km	MPC; JPL
19338	1997 AB_{2}	—	January 3, 1997	Oizumi	T. Kobayashi	·	5.6 km	MPC; JPL
19339	1997 AF_{4}	—	January 6, 1997	Oizumi	T. Kobayashi	DOR · slow	9.0 km	MPC; JPL
19340	1997 AV_{4}	—	January 6, 1997	Oizumi	T. Kobayashi	·	14 km	MPC; JPL
19341	1997 AQ_{5}	—	January 7, 1997	Oizumi	T. Kobayashi	·	9.4 km	MPC; JPL
19342	1997 AA_{7}	—	January 9, 1997	Oizumi	T. Kobayashi	·	3.4 km	MPC; JPL
19343	1997 AR_{7}	—	January 5, 1997	Xinglong	SCAP	NYS	3.8 km	MPC; JPL
19344	1997 AD_{14}	—	January 2, 1997	Xinglong	SCAP	·	8.8 km	MPC; JPL
19345	1997 BV_{2}	—	January 30, 1997	Oizumi	T. Kobayashi	KOR	4.7 km	MPC; JPL
19346	1997 CG_{1}	—	February 1, 1997	Oizumi	T. Kobayashi	·	5.7 km	MPC; JPL
19347	1997 CH_{9}	—	February 1, 1997	Kitt Peak	Spacewatch	·	6.4 km	MPC; JPL
19348 Cueca	1997 CL_{12}	Cueca	February 3, 1997	Kitt Peak	Spacewatch	·	5.3 km	MPC; JPL
19349 Denjoy	1997 CF_{22}	Denjoy	February 13, 1997	Prescott	P. G. Comba	·	4.4 km	MPC; JPL
19350	1997 CU_{28}	—	February 6, 1997	Xinglong	SCAP	·	8.7 km	MPC; JPL
19351	1997 EK	—	March 1, 1997	Oizumi	T. Kobayashi	·	10 km	MPC; JPL
19352	1997 EL	—	March 1, 1997	Oizumi	T. Kobayashi	EOS	12 km	MPC; JPL
19353 Pierrethierry	1997 EQ_{30}	Pierrethierry	March 10, 1997	Ramonville	Buil, C.	·	4.2 km	MPC; JPL
19354 Fredkoehler	1997 FS_{2}	Fredkoehler	March 31, 1997	Socorro	LINEAR	·	6.3 km	MPC; JPL
19355 Merpalehmann	1997 FU_{2}	Merpalehmann	March 31, 1997	Socorro	LINEAR	·	8.6 km	MPC; JPL
19356	1997 GH_{3}	—	April 6, 1997	Haleakala	NEAT	AMO +1km	910 m	MPC; JPL
19357	1997 GZ_{7}	—	April 2, 1997	Socorro	LINEAR	fast	10 km	MPC; JPL
19358	1997 GO_{23}	—	April 6, 1997	Socorro	LINEAR	CYB	13 km	MPC; JPL
19359	1997 GB_{35}	—	April 3, 1997	Socorro	LINEAR	·	15 km	MPC; JPL
19360	1997 JS_{12}	—	May 3, 1997	La Silla	E. W. Elst	THM · fast	6.8 km	MPC; JPL
19361	1997 KH_{4}	—	May 31, 1997	Kitt Peak	Spacewatch	·	3.9 km	MPC; JPL
19362	1997 MX_{3}	—	June 28, 1997	Socorro	LINEAR	EOS	5.8 km	MPC; JPL
19363	1997 OL_{2}	—	July 31, 1997	Caussols	ODAS	·	8.9 km	MPC; JPL
19364 Semafor	1997 SM_{1}	Semafor	September 21, 1997	Ondřejov	L. Kotková	EUN	7.1 km	MPC; JPL
19365	1997 VL_{5}	—	November 8, 1997	Oizumi	T. Kobayashi	·	3.2 km	MPC; JPL
19366 Sudingqiang	1997 VZ_{7}	Sudingqiang	November 6, 1997	Xinglong	SCAP	EUN	6.8 km	MPC; JPL
19367 Pink Floyd	1997 XW_{3}	Pink Floyd	December 3, 1997	Caussols	ODAS	·	6.7 km	MPC; JPL
19368	1997 XZ_{4}	—	December 6, 1997	Caussols	ODAS	·	2.3 km	MPC; JPL
19369	1997 YO	—	December 20, 1997	Oizumi	T. Kobayashi	·	14 km	MPC; JPL
19370 Yukyung	1997 YY_{8}	Yukyung	December 25, 1997	Haleakala	NEAT	·	8.4 km	MPC; JPL
19371	1997 YP_{11}	—	December 27, 1997	Gekko	T. Kagawa, T. Urata	·	3.8 km	MPC; JPL
19372	1997 YP_{13}	—	December 31, 1997	Oizumi	T. Kobayashi	·	4.7 km	MPC; JPL
19373	1997 YC_{14}	—	December 31, 1997	Oizumi	T. Kobayashi	·	4.5 km	MPC; JPL
19374	1997 YG_{17}	—	December 27, 1997	Kitt Peak	Spacewatch	·	2.2 km	MPC; JPL
19375	1998 AB_{5}	—	January 6, 1998	Woomera	F. B. Zoltowski	·	2.4 km	MPC; JPL
19376	1998 BE_{1}	—	January 19, 1998	Oizumi	T. Kobayashi	·	2.3 km	MPC; JPL
19377	1998 BE_{4}	—	January 21, 1998	Nachi-Katsuura	Y. Shimizu, T. Urata	·	2.6 km	MPC; JPL
19378	1998 BB_{7}	—	January 24, 1998	Oizumi	T. Kobayashi	V	2.5 km	MPC; JPL
19379 Labrecque	1998 BR_{7}	Labrecque	January 24, 1998	Haleakala	NEAT	PHO	5.3 km	MPC; JPL
19380	1998 BB_{11}	—	January 23, 1998	Socorro	LINEAR	V	2.9 km	MPC; JPL
19381	1998 BB_{15}	—	January 24, 1998	Haleakala	NEAT	·	2.1 km	MPC; JPL
19382	1998 BH_{25}	—	January 28, 1998	Oizumi	T. Kobayashi	·	7.1 km	MPC; JPL
19383 Rolling Stones	1998 BZ_{32}	Rolling Stones	January 29, 1998	Caussols	ODAS	V	2.7 km	MPC; JPL
19384 Winton	1998 CP_{1}	Winton	February 6, 1998	Kleť	J. Tichá, M. Tichý	·	2.6 km	MPC; JPL
19385	1998 CE_{4}	—	February 13, 1998	Xinglong	SCAP	·	2.9 km	MPC; JPL
19386 Axelcronstedt	1998 CR_{4}	Axelcronstedt	February 6, 1998	La Silla	E. W. Elst	·	3.5 km	MPC; JPL
19387	1998 DA_{2}	—	February 18, 1998	Woomera	F. B. Zoltowski	·	3.5 km	MPC; JPL
19388	1998 DQ_{3}	—	February 22, 1998	Haleakala	NEAT	·	3.6 km	MPC; JPL
19389	1998 DD_{14}	—	February 27, 1998	Caussols	ODAS	·	13 km	MPC; JPL
19390 Deledda	1998 DK_{14}	Deledda	February 24, 1998	Farra d'Isonzo	Farra d'Isonzo	·	3.8 km	MPC; JPL
19391	1998 DR_{15}	—	February 22, 1998	Haleakala	NEAT	·	3.6 km	MPC; JPL
19392 Oyamada	1998 DW_{31}	Oyamada	February 22, 1998	Nanyo	T. Okuni	V	2.3 km	MPC; JPL
19393 Davidthompson	1998 DT_{33}	Davidthompson	February 27, 1998	La Silla	E. W. Elst	·	3.3 km	MPC; JPL
19394	1998 DA_{34}	—	February 27, 1998	La Silla	E. W. Elst	·	2.4 km	MPC; JPL
19395 Barrera	1998 EP_{1}	Barrera	March 2, 1998	Caussols	ODAS	·	3.0 km	MPC; JPL
19396	1998 EV_{1}	—	March 2, 1998	Caussols	ODAS	·	4.3 km	MPC; JPL
19397 Lagarini	1998 ER_{3}	Lagarini	March 3, 1998	Caussols	ODAS	NYS	3.7 km	MPC; JPL
19398 Creedence	1998 EM_{8}	Creedence	March 2, 1998	Sormano	P. Sicoli, Ghezzi, P.	·	2.4 km	MPC; JPL
19399	1998 EP_{10}	—	March 1, 1998	La Silla	E. W. Elst	·	5.6 km	MPC; JPL
19400 Emileclaus	1998 EC_{11}	Emileclaus	March 1, 1998	La Silla	E. W. Elst	·	3.3 km	MPC; JPL

== 19401–19500 ==
back to top

Designation			Discovery			Properties		Ref
Permanent	Provisional	Named after	Date	Site	Discoverer(s)	Category	Diam.	Ref
19401	1998 ES_{11}	—	March 1, 1998	La Silla	E. W. Elst	·	2.2 km	MPC; JPL
19402	1998 EG_{14}	—	March 1, 1998	La Silla	E. W. Elst	·	2.9 km	MPC; JPL
19403	1998 FA_{1}	—	March 18, 1998	Kitt Peak	Spacewatch	·	3.5 km	MPC; JPL
19404	1998 FO_{5}	—	March 24, 1998	Woomera	F. B. Zoltowski	·	4.7 km	MPC; JPL
19405	1998 FT_{8}	—	March 21, 1998	Kitt Peak	Spacewatch	·	4.0 km	MPC; JPL
19406	1998 FM_{10}	—	March 24, 1998	Caussols	ODAS	·	4.7 km	MPC; JPL
19407 Standing Bear	1998 FG_{11}	Standing Bear	March 25, 1998	Lime Creek	R. Linderholm	MAR	6.6 km	MPC; JPL
19408	1998 FM_{11}	—	March 22, 1998	Oizumi	T. Kobayashi	EOS	6.3 km	MPC; JPL
19409	1998 FA_{12}	—	March 24, 1998	Haleakala	NEAT	·	3.2 km	MPC; JPL
19410 Guisard	1998 FW_{14}	Guisard	March 26, 1998	Caussols	ODAS	V	2.4 km	MPC; JPL
19411 Collinarnold	1998 FJ_{22}	Collinarnold	March 20, 1998	Socorro	LINEAR	·	3.2 km	MPC; JPL
19412	1998 FC_{24}	—	March 20, 1998	Socorro	LINEAR	·	4.4 km	MPC; JPL
19413 Grantlewis	1998 FB_{30}	Grantlewis	March 20, 1998	Socorro	LINEAR	·	5.1 km	MPC; JPL
19414	1998 FP_{32}	—	March 20, 1998	Socorro	LINEAR	·	5.2 km	MPC; JPL
19415 Parvamenon	1998 FC_{34}	Parvamenon	March 20, 1998	Socorro	LINEAR	ERI	5.8 km	MPC; JPL
19416 Benglass	1998 FM_{34}	Benglass	March 20, 1998	Socorro	LINEAR	V	2.3 km	MPC; JPL
19417 Madelynho	1998 FG_{40}	Madelynho	March 20, 1998	Socorro	LINEAR	MAS	2.3 km	MPC; JPL
19418	1998 FL_{49}	—	March 20, 1998	Socorro	LINEAR	·	3.7 km	MPC; JPL
19419 Pinkham	1998 FO_{49}	Pinkham	March 20, 1998	Socorro	LINEAR	·	3.6 km	MPC; JPL
19420 Vivekbuch	1998 FB_{54}	Vivekbuch	March 20, 1998	Socorro	LINEAR	(7744)	5.8 km	MPC; JPL
19421 Zachulett	1998 FD_{56}	Zachulett	March 20, 1998	Socorro	LINEAR	·	4.9 km	MPC; JPL
19422	1998 FV_{56}	—	March 20, 1998	Socorro	LINEAR	·	4.4 km	MPC; JPL
19423 Hefter	1998 FD_{58}	Hefter	March 20, 1998	Socorro	LINEAR	·	4.0 km	MPC; JPL
19424 Andrewsong	1998 FH_{61}	Andrewsong	March 20, 1998	Socorro	LINEAR	·	2.2 km	MPC; JPL
19425 Nicholasrapp	1998 FW_{61}	Nicholasrapp	March 20, 1998	Socorro	LINEAR	·	5.4 km	MPC; JPL
19426 Leal	1998 FP_{65}	Leal	March 20, 1998	Socorro	LINEAR	·	7.8 km	MPC; JPL
19427	1998 FJ_{66}	—	March 20, 1998	Socorro	LINEAR	·	10 km	MPC; JPL
19428 Gracehsu	1998 FU_{66}	Gracehsu	March 20, 1998	Socorro	LINEAR	·	4.1 km	MPC; JPL
19429 Grubaugh	1998 FD_{69}	Grubaugh	March 20, 1998	Socorro	LINEAR	NYS	4.1 km	MPC; JPL
19430 Kristinaufer	1998 FO_{69}	Kristinaufer	March 20, 1998	Socorro	LINEAR	·	2.8 km	MPC; JPL
19431	1998 FS_{70}	—	March 20, 1998	Socorro	LINEAR	·	14 km	MPC; JPL
19432	1998 FL_{71}	—	March 20, 1998	Socorro	LINEAR	·	3.3 km	MPC; JPL
19433 Naftz	1998 FG_{72}	Naftz	March 20, 1998	Socorro	LINEAR	·	4.0 km	MPC; JPL
19434 Bahuffman	1998 FD_{75}	Bahuffman	March 24, 1998	Socorro	LINEAR	·	2.1 km	MPC; JPL
19435	1998 FN_{75}	—	March 24, 1998	Socorro	LINEAR	MAR	5.5 km	MPC; JPL
19436 Marycole	1998 FR_{76}	Marycole	March 24, 1998	Socorro	LINEAR	·	3.4 km	MPC; JPL
19437 Jennyblank	1998 FQ_{79}	Jennyblank	March 24, 1998	Socorro	LINEAR	·	4.4 km	MPC; JPL
19438 Khaki	1998 FF_{83}	Khaki	March 24, 1998	Socorro	LINEAR	·	3.7 km	MPC; JPL
19439 Allisontjong	1998 FB_{91}	Allisontjong	March 24, 1998	Socorro	LINEAR	·	6.9 km	MPC; JPL
19440 Sumatijain	1998 FN_{103}	Sumatijain	March 31, 1998	Socorro	LINEAR	·	2.6 km	MPC; JPL
19441 Trucpham	1998 FJ_{105}	Trucpham	March 31, 1998	Socorro	LINEAR	·	6.7 km	MPC; JPL
19442 Brianrice	1998 FM_{106}	Brianrice	March 31, 1998	Socorro	LINEAR	PAD	6.8 km	MPC; JPL
19443 Yanzhong	1998 FE_{109}	Yanzhong	March 31, 1998	Socorro	LINEAR	·	2.5 km	MPC; JPL
19444 Addicott	1998 FT_{109}	Addicott	March 31, 1998	Socorro	LINEAR	·	4.0 km	MPC; JPL
19445	1998 FE_{112}	—	March 31, 1998	Socorro	LINEAR	·	8.4 km	MPC; JPL
19446 Muroski	1998 FX_{113}	Muroski	March 31, 1998	Socorro	LINEAR	·	6.4 km	MPC; JPL
19447 Jessicapearl	1998 FD_{114}	Jessicapearl	March 31, 1998	Socorro	LINEAR	V	2.8 km	MPC; JPL
19448 Jenniferling	1998 FJ_{122}	Jenniferling	March 20, 1998	Socorro	LINEAR	·	2.3 km	MPC; JPL
19449	1998 FE_{125}	—	March 24, 1998	Socorro	LINEAR	ADE	8.7 km	MPC; JPL
19450 Sussman	1998 FF_{125}	Sussman	March 24, 1998	Socorro	LINEAR	·	3.0 km	MPC; JPL
19451	1998 FP_{125}	—	March 31, 1998	Socorro	LINEAR	·	6.3 km	MPC; JPL
19452 Keeney	1998 FX_{125}	Keeney	March 31, 1998	Socorro	LINEAR	·	3.3 km	MPC; JPL
19453 Murdochorne	1998 FM_{126}	Murdochorne	March 28, 1998	Reedy Creek	J. Broughton	·	2.8 km	MPC; JPL
19454 Henrymarr	1998 FX_{127}	Henrymarr	March 25, 1998	Socorro	LINEAR	V	2.6 km	MPC; JPL
19455	1998 FJ_{145}	—	March 24, 1998	Socorro	LINEAR	·	4.2 km	MPC; JPL
19456 Pimdouglas	1998 HU_{5}	Pimdouglas	April 21, 1998	Caussols	ODAS	·	2.6 km	MPC; JPL
19457 Robcastillo	1998 HE_{6}	Robcastillo	April 21, 1998	Caussols	ODAS	·	11 km	MPC; JPL
19458 Legault	1998 HE_{8}	Legault	April 21, 1998	Les Tardieux Obs.	Boeuf, M.	slow	2.6 km	MPC; JPL
19459	1998 HM_{11}	—	April 18, 1998	Kitt Peak	Spacewatch	·	4.1 km	MPC; JPL
19460	1998 HW_{13}	—	April 18, 1998	Socorro	LINEAR	·	7.2 km	MPC; JPL
19461 Feingold	1998 HZ_{16}	Feingold	April 18, 1998	Socorro	LINEAR	·	3.5 km	MPC; JPL
19462 Ulissedini	1998 HE_{20}	Ulissedini	April 27, 1998	Prescott	P. G. Comba	KOR	7.5 km	MPC; JPL
19463 Emilystoll	1998 HY_{29}	Emilystoll	April 20, 1998	Socorro	LINEAR	·	5.4 km	MPC; JPL
19464 Ciarabarr	1998 HZ_{29}	Ciarabarr	April 20, 1998	Socorro	LINEAR	·	5.3 km	MPC; JPL
19465 Amandarusso	1998 HA_{32}	Amandarusso	April 20, 1998	Socorro	LINEAR	PAD	5.9 km	MPC; JPL
19466 Darcydiegel	1998 HQ_{34}	Darcydiegel	April 20, 1998	Socorro	LINEAR	WIT	2.3 km	MPC; JPL
19467 Amandanagy	1998 HU_{39}	Amandanagy	April 20, 1998	Socorro	LINEAR	·	4.2 km	MPC; JPL
19468	1998 HO_{45}	—	April 20, 1998	Socorro	LINEAR	·	4.5 km	MPC; JPL
19469	1998 HV_{45}	—	April 20, 1998	Socorro	LINEAR	·	7.2 km	MPC; JPL
19470 Wenpingchen	1998 HE_{52}	Wenpingchen	April 30, 1998	Anderson Mesa	LONEOS	KOR	5.0 km	MPC; JPL
19471	1998 HK_{52}	—	April 25, 1998	Woomera	F. B. Zoltowski	·	6.8 km	MPC; JPL
19472	1998 HL_{52}	—	April 27, 1998	Woomera	F. B. Zoltowski	·	5.7 km	MPC; JPL
19473 Marygardner	1998 HE_{60}	Marygardner	April 21, 1998	Socorro	LINEAR	·	3.3 km	MPC; JPL
19474	1998 HJ_{80}	—	April 21, 1998	Socorro	LINEAR	·	7.4 km	MPC; JPL
19475 Mispagel	1998 HA_{91}	Mispagel	April 21, 1998	Socorro	LINEAR	·	3.7 km	MPC; JPL
19476 Denduluri	1998 HQ_{94}	Denduluri	April 21, 1998	Socorro	LINEAR	·	4.2 km	MPC; JPL
19477 Teresajentz	1998 HB_{95}	Teresajentz	April 21, 1998	Socorro	LINEAR	KOR	5.6 km	MPC; JPL
19478 Jaimeflores	1998 HY_{96}	Jaimeflores	April 21, 1998	Socorro	LINEAR	NYS	3.1 km	MPC; JPL
19479	1998 HG_{97}	—	April 21, 1998	Socorro	LINEAR	·	9.1 km	MPC; JPL
19480	1998 HJ_{100}	—	April 21, 1998	Socorro	LINEAR	GEF	5.6 km	MPC; JPL
19481	1998 HX_{101}	—	April 25, 1998	La Silla	E. W. Elst	·	7.3 km	MPC; JPL
19482 Harperlee	1998 HL_{102}	Harperlee	April 25, 1998	La Silla	E. W. Elst	LIX	13 km	MPC; JPL
19483	1998 HA_{116}	—	April 23, 1998	Socorro	LINEAR	·	6.5 km	MPC; JPL
19484 Vanessaspini	1998 HF_{121}	Vanessaspini	April 23, 1998	Socorro	LINEAR	·	4.8 km	MPC; JPL
19485	1998 HC_{122}	—	April 23, 1998	Socorro	LINEAR	EOS · slow	10 km	MPC; JPL
19486	1998 HW_{122}	—	April 23, 1998	Socorro	LINEAR	slow	6.6 km	MPC; JPL
19487 Rosscoleman	1998 HO_{124}	Rosscoleman	April 23, 1998	Socorro	LINEAR	·	3.9 km	MPC; JPL
19488 Abramcoley	1998 HW_{125}	Abramcoley	April 23, 1998	Socorro	LINEAR	·	2.9 km	MPC; JPL
19489	1998 HL_{149}	—	April 25, 1998	La Silla	E. W. Elst	(5)	4.7 km	MPC; JPL
19490	1998 HC_{150}	—	April 19, 1998	Kitt Peak	Spacewatch	EUN	5.7 km	MPC; JPL
19491	1998 HG_{153}	—	April 24, 1998	Socorro	LINEAR	·	7.1 km	MPC; JPL
19492	1998 JT	—	May 1, 1998	Haleakala	NEAT	·	3.3 km	MPC; JPL
19493	1998 JY_{1}	—	May 1, 1998	Haleakala	NEAT	·	4.5 km	MPC; JPL
19494 Gerbs	1998 KJ_{8}	Gerbs	May 23, 1998	Anderson Mesa	LONEOS	EOS	8.5 km	MPC; JPL
19495 Terentyeva	1998 KZ_{8}	Terentyeva	May 23, 1998	Anderson Mesa	LONEOS	MAR	6.0 km	MPC; JPL
19496 Josephbarone	1998 KC_{32}	Josephbarone	May 22, 1998	Socorro	LINEAR	NYS	5.0 km	MPC; JPL
19497 Pineda	1998 KN_{32}	Pineda	May 22, 1998	Socorro	LINEAR	NYS	4.6 km	MPC; JPL
19498	1998 KG_{38}	—	May 22, 1998	Socorro	LINEAR	·	5.4 km	MPC; JPL
19499 Eugenybiryukov	1998 KR_{42}	Eugenybiryukov	May 27, 1998	Anderson Mesa	LONEOS	·	4.5 km	MPC; JPL
19500 Hillaryfultz	1998 KF_{49}	Hillaryfultz	May 23, 1998	Socorro	LINEAR	·	7.6 km	MPC; JPL

== 19501–19600 ==
back to top

Designation			Discovery			Properties		Ref
Permanent	Provisional	Named after	Date	Site	Discoverer(s)	Category	Diam.	Ref
19501	1998 KC_{50}	—	May 23, 1998	Socorro	LINEAR	·	15 km	MPC; JPL
19502	1998 KB_{51}	—	May 23, 1998	Socorro	LINEAR	·	5.0 km	MPC; JPL
19503	1998 KE_{65}	—	May 22, 1998	Socorro	LINEAR	INA	14 km	MPC; JPL
19504 Vladalekseev	1998 LL_{2}	Vladalekseev	June 1, 1998	La Silla	E. W. Elst	EOS	8.9 km	MPC; JPL
19505	1998 MC	—	June 16, 1998	Woomera	F. B. Zoltowski	·	3.8 km	MPC; JPL
19506 Angellopez	1998 MN_{4}	Angellopez	June 18, 1998	Majorca	Á. López J., R. Pacheco	·	6.8 km	MPC; JPL
19507	1998 MZ_{13}	—	June 19, 1998	Caussols	ODAS	EOS	7.1 km	MPC; JPL
19508	1998 MC_{17}	—	June 27, 1998	Kitt Peak	Spacewatch	·	9.1 km	MPC; JPL
19509 Niigata	1998 MG_{38}	Niigata	June 29, 1998	Anderson Mesa	LONEOS	·	7.5 km	MPC; JPL
19510	1998 MV_{42}	—	June 26, 1998	La Silla	E. W. Elst	·	3.8 km	MPC; JPL
19511	1998 MC_{45}	—	June 19, 1998	Socorro	LINEAR	EUN	4.6 km	MPC; JPL
19512	1998 QU_{2}	—	August 17, 1998	Socorro	LINEAR	·	4.0 km	MPC; JPL
19513	1998 QN_{7}	—	August 17, 1998	Socorro	LINEAR	CYB	16 km	MPC; JPL
19514	1998 QB_{75}	—	August 24, 1998	Socorro	LINEAR	EUN	5.4 km	MPC; JPL
19515	1998 QM_{76}	—	August 24, 1998	Socorro	LINEAR	·	6.6 km	MPC; JPL
19516	1998 QF_{80}	—	August 24, 1998	Socorro	LINEAR	·	11 km	MPC; JPL
19517 Robertocarlos	1998 SK_{164}	Robertocarlos	September 18, 1998	La Silla	E. W. Elst	·	11 km	MPC; JPL
19518 Moulding	1998 VZ_{13}	Moulding	November 10, 1998	Socorro	LINEAR	·	3.6 km	MPC; JPL
19519	1998 WB_{8}	—	November 18, 1998	Kushiro	S. Ueda, H. Kaneda	·	3.8 km	MPC; JPL
19520	1998 WC_{24}	—	November 25, 1998	Socorro	LINEAR	EUN	6.7 km	MPC; JPL
19521 Chaos	1998 WH_{24}	Chaos	November 19, 1998	Kitt Peak	Deep Ecliptic Survey	cubewano (hot)	600 km	MPC; JPL
19522	1998 XQ_{83}	—	December 15, 1998	Socorro	LINEAR	EUN	6.7 km	MPC; JPL
19523 Paolofrisi	1998 YX_{3}	Paolofrisi	December 18, 1998	Bologna	San Vittore	·	6.9 km	MPC; JPL
19524 Acaciacoleman	1998 YB_{7}	Acaciacoleman	December 23, 1998	Kanab	Sheridan, E. E.	·	6.0 km	MPC; JPL
19525	1999 CO	—	February 5, 1999	Oizumi	T. Kobayashi	·	9.9 km	MPC; JPL
19526	1999 FS_{7}	—	March 20, 1999	Socorro	LINEAR	·	2.7 km	MPC; JPL
19527	1999 FN_{30}	—	March 19, 1999	Socorro	LINEAR	·	4.7 km	MPC; JPL
19528 Delloro	1999 GB_{1}	Delloro	April 4, 1999	San Marcello	G. D'Abramo, A. Boattini	THM	8.0 km	MPC; JPL
19529	1999 GQ_{15}	—	April 15, 1999	Kitt Peak	Spacewatch	NYS	4.9 km	MPC; JPL
19530	1999 GQ_{23}	—	April 6, 1999	Socorro	LINEAR	·	7.4 km	MPC; JPL
19531 Charton	1999 GM_{32}	Charton	April 7, 1999	Socorro	LINEAR	·	3.2 km	MPC; JPL
19532	1999 GB_{34}	—	April 6, 1999	Socorro	LINEAR	·	3.7 km	MPC; JPL
19533 Garrison	1999 GM_{35}	Garrison	April 7, 1999	Socorro	LINEAR	·	2.7 km	MPC; JPL
19534 Miyagi	1999 GL_{47}	Miyagi	April 6, 1999	Anderson Mesa	LONEOS	·	3.1 km	MPC; JPL
19535 Rowanatkinson	1999 HF_{3}	Rowanatkinson	April 24, 1999	Reedy Creek	J. Broughton	·	5.1 km	MPC; JPL
19536	1999 JM_{4}	—	May 10, 1999	Socorro	LINEAR	PHO	2.7 km	MPC; JPL
19537	1999 JL_{8}	—	May 12, 1999	Socorro	LINEAR	H	3.4 km	MPC; JPL
19538	1999 JD_{12}	—	May 13, 1999	Socorro	LINEAR	·	3.7 km	MPC; JPL
19539 Anaverdu	1999 JO_{14}	Anaverdu	May 14, 1999	Ametlla de Mar	J. Nomen	·	2.1 km	MPC; JPL
19540	1999 JF_{23}	—	May 10, 1999	Socorro	LINEAR	·	2.6 km	MPC; JPL
19541	1999 JA_{27}	—	May 10, 1999	Socorro	LINEAR	NYS	3.5 km	MPC; JPL
19542 Lindperkins	1999 JL_{27}	Lindperkins	May 10, 1999	Socorro	LINEAR	·	2.1 km	MPC; JPL
19543 Burgoyne	1999 JR_{30}	Burgoyne	May 10, 1999	Socorro	LINEAR	·	2.9 km	MPC; JPL
19544 Avramkottke	1999 JN_{33}	Avramkottke	May 10, 1999	Socorro	LINEAR	NYS	3.8 km	MPC; JPL
19545	1999 JY_{33}	—	May 10, 1999	Socorro	LINEAR	·	4.7 km	MPC; JPL
19546	1999 JN_{34}	—	May 10, 1999	Socorro	LINEAR	·	3.7 km	MPC; JPL
19547 Collier	1999 JP_{57}	Collier	May 10, 1999	Socorro	LINEAR	·	2.1 km	MPC; JPL
19548	1999 JJ_{58}	—	May 10, 1999	Socorro	LINEAR	·	6.3 km	MPC; JPL
19549	1999 JS_{58}	—	May 10, 1999	Socorro	LINEAR	·	3.9 km	MPC; JPL
19550 Samabates	1999 JP_{61}	Samabates	May 10, 1999	Socorro	LINEAR	·	2.7 km	MPC; JPL
19551 Peterborden	1999 JL_{62}	Peterborden	May 10, 1999	Socorro	LINEAR	·	3.5 km	MPC; JPL
19552	1999 JJ_{68}	—	May 12, 1999	Socorro	LINEAR	NYS	2.6 km	MPC; JPL
19553	1999 JF_{71}	—	May 12, 1999	Socorro	LINEAR	·	3.8 km	MPC; JPL
19554	1999 JU_{74}	—	May 12, 1999	Socorro	LINEAR	EUN	3.6 km	MPC; JPL
19555	1999 JO_{77}	—	May 12, 1999	Socorro	LINEAR	RAF	5.0 km	MPC; JPL
19556	1999 JV_{77}	—	May 12, 1999	Socorro	LINEAR	PHO	5.7 km	MPC; JPL
19557	1999 JC_{79}	—	May 13, 1999	Socorro	LINEAR	MAR	8.4 km	MPC; JPL
19558	1999 JK_{80}	—	May 12, 1999	Socorro	LINEAR	PHO	6.3 km	MPC; JPL
19559	1999 JY_{80}	—	May 12, 1999	Socorro	LINEAR	EUN	5.7 km	MPC; JPL
19560	1999 JH_{81}	—	May 14, 1999	Socorro	LINEAR	EUN	5.2 km	MPC; JPL
19561	1999 JK_{81}	—	May 14, 1999	Socorro	LINEAR	·	5.5 km	MPC; JPL
19562	1999 JM_{81}	—	May 14, 1999	Socorro	LINEAR	EUN	6.9 km	MPC; JPL
19563 Brzezinska	1999 JB_{124}	Brzezinska	May 14, 1999	Socorro	LINEAR	·	2.9 km	MPC; JPL
19564 Ajburnetti	1999 JP_{126}	Ajburnetti	May 13, 1999	Socorro	LINEAR	·	2.8 km	MPC; JPL
19565	1999 KF_{4}	—	May 20, 1999	Socorro	LINEAR	·	17 km	MPC; JPL
19566	1999 KO_{6}	—	May 23, 1999	Woomera	F. B. Zoltowski	NYS	2.7 km	MPC; JPL
19567	1999 KS_{7}	—	May 20, 1999	Socorro	LINEAR	·	8.2 km	MPC; JPL
19568 Rachelmarie	1999 KY_{14}	Rachelmarie	May 18, 1999	Socorro	LINEAR	·	3.7 km	MPC; JPL
19569	1999 KM_{15}	—	May 20, 1999	Socorro	LINEAR	·	6.8 km	MPC; JPL
19570 Jessedouglas	1999 LH_{6}	Jessedouglas	June 13, 1999	Prescott	P. G. Comba	V	4.8 km	MPC; JPL
19571	1999 LA_{7}	—	June 8, 1999	Kitt Peak	Spacewatch	NYS	3.7 km	MPC; JPL
19572 Leahmarie	1999 LE_{11}	Leahmarie	June 8, 1999	Socorro	LINEAR	·	2.6 km	MPC; JPL
19573 Cummings	1999 LW_{13}	Cummings	June 9, 1999	Socorro	LINEAR	·	3.7 km	MPC; JPL
19574 Davidedwards	1999 LQ_{21}	Davidedwards	June 9, 1999	Socorro	LINEAR	·	2.9 km	MPC; JPL
19575 Feeny	1999 LB_{22}	Feeny	June 9, 1999	Socorro	LINEAR	·	2.1 km	MPC; JPL
19576	1999 LP_{22}	—	June 9, 1999	Socorro	LINEAR	·	2.5 km	MPC; JPL
19577 Bobbyfisher	1999 LP_{26}	Bobbyfisher	June 9, 1999	Socorro	LINEAR	·	3.4 km	MPC; JPL
19578 Kirkdouglas	1999 MO	Kirkdouglas	June 20, 1999	Reedy Creek	J. Broughton	NYS	2.7 km	MPC; JPL
19579	1999 MB_{1}	—	June 23, 1999	Woomera	F. B. Zoltowski	slow	4.1 km	MPC; JPL
19580	1999 ND	—	July 4, 1999	Višnjan Observatory	K. Korlević	·	13 km	MPC; JPL
19581	1999 NC_{3}	—	July 13, 1999	Socorro	LINEAR	·	4.9 km	MPC; JPL
19582 Blow	1999 NL_{4}	Blow	July 13, 1999	Reedy Creek	J. Broughton	·	3.8 km	MPC; JPL
19583	1999 NT_{4}	—	July 12, 1999	Višnjan Observatory	K. Korlević	·	2.5 km	MPC; JPL
19584 Sarahgerin	1999 NZ_{6}	Sarahgerin	July 13, 1999	Socorro	LINEAR	·	3.2 km	MPC; JPL
19585 Zachopkins	1999 NU_{7}	Zachopkins	July 13, 1999	Socorro	LINEAR	·	4.2 km	MPC; JPL
19586	1999 NA_{10}	—	July 13, 1999	Socorro	LINEAR	KOR	6.1 km	MPC; JPL
19587 Keremane	1999 NG_{11}	Keremane	July 13, 1999	Socorro	LINEAR	KOR	6.4 km	MPC; JPL
19588	1999 NL_{11}	—	July 13, 1999	Socorro	LINEAR	THM ·	9.5 km	MPC; JPL
19589 Kirkland	1999 NZ_{14}	Kirkland	July 14, 1999	Socorro	LINEAR	V	3.9 km	MPC; JPL
19590	1999 NG_{18}	—	July 14, 1999	Socorro	LINEAR	·	16 km	MPC; JPL
19591 Michaelklein	1999 NW_{21}	Michaelklein	July 14, 1999	Socorro	LINEAR	·	6.7 km	MPC; JPL
19592	1999 NZ_{22}	—	July 14, 1999	Socorro	LINEAR	(5)	4.1 km	MPC; JPL
19593 Justinkoh	1999 NZ_{29}	Justinkoh	July 14, 1999	Socorro	LINEAR	·	5.3 km	MPC; JPL
19594	1999 NL_{31}	—	July 14, 1999	Socorro	LINEAR	·	7.3 km	MPC; JPL
19595 Lafer-Sousa	1999 NW_{31}	Lafer-Sousa	July 14, 1999	Socorro	LINEAR	·	2.9 km	MPC; JPL
19596 Spegorlarson	1999 NX_{31}	Spegorlarson	July 14, 1999	Socorro	LINEAR	·	3.9 km	MPC; JPL
19597 Ryanlee	1999 NJ_{32}	Ryanlee	July 14, 1999	Socorro	LINEAR	KOR	3.8 km	MPC; JPL
19598 Luttrell	1999 NL_{39}	Luttrell	July 14, 1999	Socorro	LINEAR	slow?	2.5 km	MPC; JPL
19599 Brycemelton	1999 NX_{40}	Brycemelton	July 14, 1999	Socorro	LINEAR	·	3.5 km	MPC; JPL
19600	1999 NV_{41}	—	July 14, 1999	Socorro	LINEAR	·	7.0 km	MPC; JPL

== 19601–19700 ==
back to top

Designation			Discovery			Properties		Ref
Permanent	Provisional	Named after	Date	Site	Discoverer(s)	Category	Diam.	Ref
19601	1999 ND_{42}	—	July 14, 1999	Socorro	LINEAR	THM	7.7 km	MPC; JPL
19602 Austinminor	1999 NK_{42}	Austinminor	July 14, 1999	Socorro	LINEAR	·	7.6 km	MPC; JPL
19603 Monier	1999 NF_{48}	Monier	July 13, 1999	Socorro	LINEAR	·	4.2 km	MPC; JPL
19604	1999 NY_{48}	—	July 13, 1999	Socorro	LINEAR	GEF	4.3 km	MPC; JPL
19605	1999 NU_{52}	—	July 12, 1999	Socorro	LINEAR	MAR	6.0 km	MPC; JPL
19606	1999 NV_{54}	—	July 12, 1999	Socorro	LINEAR	·	4.9 km	MPC; JPL
19607	1999 NF_{55}	—	July 12, 1999	Socorro	LINEAR	MAR	5.1 km	MPC; JPL
19608	1999 NC_{57}	—	July 12, 1999	Socorro	LINEAR	·	13 km	MPC; JPL
19609	1999 ND_{57}	—	July 12, 1999	Socorro	LINEAR	·	5.2 km	MPC; JPL
19610	1999 NR_{60}	—	July 13, 1999	Socorro	LINEAR	·	7.0 km	MPC; JPL
19611	1999 NP_{64}	—	July 14, 1999	Socorro	LINEAR	EOS	5.6 km	MPC; JPL
19612 Noordung	1999 OO	Noordung	July 17, 1999	Črni Vrh	Črni Vrh	V	3.7 km	MPC; JPL
19613	1999 OX	—	July 19, 1999	Kleť	Kleť	GEF	5.1 km	MPC; JPL
19614 Montelongo	1999 OV_{1}	Montelongo	July 16, 1999	Socorro	LINEAR	·	3.3 km	MPC; JPL
19615	1999 OB_{3}	—	July 22, 1999	Socorro	LINEAR	·	22 km	MPC; JPL
19616	1999 OS_{3}	—	July 24, 1999	Bickley	Perth Observatory	·	3.6 km	MPC; JPL
19617 Duhamel	1999 PH_{1}	Duhamel	August 8, 1999	Prescott	P. G. Comba	·	11 km	MPC; JPL
19618 Maša	1999 PN_{3}	Maša	August 11, 1999	Črni Vrh	Skvarč, J.	·	4.1 km	MPC; JPL
19619 Bethbell	1999 QA	Bethbell	August 16, 1999	Farpoint	G. Bell	·	2.3 km	MPC; JPL
19620 Auckland	1999 QG	Auckland	August 18, 1999	Auckland	Auckland	EUN	4.7 km	MPC; JPL
19621	1999 RE_{1}	—	September 4, 1999	Gekko	T. Kagawa	MAR	5.2 km	MPC; JPL
19622	1999 RY_{2}	—	September 6, 1999	Višnjan Observatory	K. Korlević	·	11 km	MPC; JPL
19623	1999 RS_{3}	—	September 4, 1999	Catalina	CSS	V	2.7 km	MPC; JPL
19624	1999 RJ_{10}	—	September 7, 1999	Socorro	LINEAR	·	9.0 km	MPC; JPL
19625 Ovaitt	1999 RT_{11}	Ovaitt	September 7, 1999	Socorro	LINEAR	·	5.1 km	MPC; JPL
19626	1999 RJ_{16}	—	September 7, 1999	Socorro	LINEAR	·	7.6 km	MPC; JPL
19627	1999 RU_{16}	—	September 7, 1999	Socorro	LINEAR	KOR	6.1 km	MPC; JPL
19628	1999 RD_{22}	—	September 7, 1999	Socorro	LINEAR	·	6.1 km	MPC; JPL
19629 Serra	1999 RV_{31}	Serra	September 8, 1999	Guitalens	Klotz, A.	·	4.7 km	MPC; JPL
19630 Janebell	1999 RT_{33}	Janebell	September 2, 1999	Farpoint	G. Bell	MAR	4.2 km	MPC; JPL
19631 Greensleeves	1999 RY_{38}	Greensleeves	September 13, 1999	Reedy Creek	J. Broughton	GEF	4.4 km	MPC; JPL
19632	1999 RP_{39}	—	September 13, 1999	Zeno	T. Stafford	·	5.6 km	MPC; JPL
19633 Rusjan	1999 RX_{42}	Rusjan	September 13, 1999	Črni Vrh	Črni Vrh	·	4.4 km	MPC; JPL
19634	1999 RG_{45}	—	September 14, 1999	Fountain Hills	C. W. Juels	·	18 km	MPC; JPL
19635	1999 RC_{47}	—	September 7, 1999	Socorro	LINEAR	ADE	7.0 km	MPC; JPL
19636	1999 RD_{48}	—	September 7, 1999	Socorro	LINEAR	THM	12 km	MPC; JPL
19637 Presbrey	1999 RU_{48}	Presbrey	September 7, 1999	Socorro	LINEAR	·	2.8 km	MPC; JPL
19638 Johngenereid	1999 RH_{57}	Johngenereid	September 7, 1999	Socorro	LINEAR	PAD · slow	5.7 km	MPC; JPL
19639	1999 RO_{63}	—	September 7, 1999	Socorro	LINEAR	(5)	8.8 km	MPC; JPL
19640 Ethanroth	1999 RP_{89}	Ethanroth	September 7, 1999	Socorro	LINEAR	slow	4.8 km	MPC; JPL
19641	1999 RV_{91}	—	September 7, 1999	Socorro	LINEAR	·	4.9 km	MPC; JPL
19642	1999 RK_{94}	—	September 7, 1999	Socorro	LINEAR	·	12 km	MPC; JPL
19643 Jacobrucker	1999 RA_{95}	Jacobrucker	September 7, 1999	Socorro	LINEAR	THM	7.8 km	MPC; JPL
19644	1999 RD_{102}	—	September 8, 1999	Socorro	LINEAR	·	11 km	MPC; JPL
19645	1999 RE_{102}	—	September 8, 1999	Socorro	LINEAR	·	7.3 km	MPC; JPL
19646	1999 RF_{102}	—	September 8, 1999	Socorro	LINEAR	·	23 km	MPC; JPL
19647	1999 RZ_{103}	—	September 8, 1999	Socorro	LINEAR	EOS	8.3 km	MPC; JPL
19648	1999 RK_{104}	—	September 8, 1999	Socorro	LINEAR	EUN	7.3 km	MPC; JPL
19649	1999 RQ_{104}	—	September 8, 1999	Socorro	LINEAR	·	11 km	MPC; JPL
19650	1999 RY_{105}	—	September 8, 1999	Socorro	LINEAR	URS	12 km	MPC; JPL
19651	1999 RC_{112}	—	September 9, 1999	Socorro	LINEAR	·	7.1 km	MPC; JPL
19652 Saris	1999 RC_{117}	Saris	September 9, 1999	Socorro	LINEAR	·	4.7 km	MPC; JPL
19653	1999 RD_{119}	—	September 9, 1999	Socorro	LINEAR	MAR	6.0 km	MPC; JPL
19654	1999 RW_{119}	—	September 9, 1999	Socorro	LINEAR	·	5.5 km	MPC; JPL
19655	1999 RC_{121}	—	September 9, 1999	Socorro	LINEAR	EOS	6.8 km	MPC; JPL
19656 Simpkins	1999 RA_{122}	Simpkins	September 9, 1999	Socorro	LINEAR	V	2.2 km	MPC; JPL
19657	1999 RE_{123}	—	September 9, 1999	Socorro	LINEAR	V	4.4 km	MPC; JPL
19658 Sloop	1999 RM_{125}	Sloop	September 9, 1999	Socorro	LINEAR	(5)	3.5 km	MPC; JPL
19659	1999 RB_{128}	—	September 9, 1999	Socorro	LINEAR	·	4.7 km	MPC; JPL
19660 Danielsteck	1999 RQ_{129}	Danielsteck	September 9, 1999	Socorro	LINEAR	·	2.8 km	MPC; JPL
19661	1999 RR_{130}	—	September 9, 1999	Socorro	LINEAR	DOR	12 km	MPC; JPL
19662 Stunzi	1999 RG_{132}	Stunzi	September 9, 1999	Socorro	LINEAR	V	3.0 km	MPC; JPL
19663 Rykerwatts	1999 RU_{133}	Rykerwatts	September 9, 1999	Socorro	LINEAR	·	4.7 km	MPC; JPL
19664 Yancey	1999 RV_{135}	Yancey	September 9, 1999	Socorro	LINEAR	·	7.8 km	MPC; JPL
19665	1999 RT_{137}	—	September 9, 1999	Socorro	LINEAR	EOS	9.7 km	MPC; JPL
19666	1999 RO_{144}	—	September 9, 1999	Socorro	LINEAR	·	5.1 km	MPC; JPL
19667	1999 RS_{144}	—	September 9, 1999	Socorro	LINEAR	EOS	7.7 km	MPC; JPL
19668	1999 RB_{145}	—	September 9, 1999	Socorro	LINEAR	slow	14 km	MPC; JPL
19669	1999 RB_{150}	—	September 9, 1999	Socorro	LINEAR	·	4.4 km	MPC; JPL
19670	1999 RH_{151}	—	September 9, 1999	Socorro	LINEAR	EOS	8.2 km	MPC; JPL
19671	1999 RX_{151}	—	September 9, 1999	Socorro	LINEAR	·	9.8 km	MPC; JPL
19672	1999 RP_{155}	—	September 9, 1999	Socorro	LINEAR	·	3.1 km	MPC; JPL
19673	1999 RR_{158}	—	September 9, 1999	Socorro	LINEAR	·	13 km	MPC; JPL
19674	1999 RN_{160}	—	September 9, 1999	Socorro	LINEAR	GEF	4.6 km	MPC; JPL
19675	1999 RE_{162}	—	September 9, 1999	Socorro	LINEAR	NYS	4.6 km	MPC; JPL
19676 Ofeliaguilar	1999 RY_{166}	Ofeliaguilar	September 9, 1999	Socorro	LINEAR	·	3.7 km	MPC; JPL
19677	1999 RN_{168}	—	September 9, 1999	Socorro	LINEAR	BRA	4.6 km	MPC; JPL
19678 Belczyk	1999 RO_{168}	Belczyk	September 9, 1999	Socorro	LINEAR	KOR	4.8 km	MPC; JPL
19679 Gretabetteo	1999 RF_{179}	Gretabetteo	September 9, 1999	Socorro	LINEAR	·	3.8 km	MPC; JPL
19680	1999 RE_{180}	—	September 9, 1999	Socorro	LINEAR	V	3.8 km	MPC; JPL
19681	1999 RE_{194}	—	September 7, 1999	Socorro	LINEAR	·	9.9 km	MPC; JPL
19682	1999 RW_{194}	—	September 8, 1999	Socorro	LINEAR	EUN	4.8 km	MPC; JPL
19683	1999 RK_{196}	—	September 8, 1999	Socorro	LINEAR	CLO	8.2 km	MPC; JPL
19684	1999 RL_{196}	—	September 8, 1999	Socorro	LINEAR	·	7.7 km	MPC; JPL
19685	1999 RB_{197}	—	September 8, 1999	Socorro	LINEAR	·	10 km	MPC; JPL
19686	1999 RL_{197}	—	September 8, 1999	Socorro	LINEAR	EOS	9.7 km	MPC; JPL
19687	1999 RP_{199}	—	September 8, 1999	Socorro	LINEAR	·	6.7 km	MPC; JPL
19688	1999 RR_{204}	—	September 8, 1999	Socorro	LINEAR	EOS	9.5 km	MPC; JPL
19689	1999 RX_{205}	—	September 8, 1999	Socorro	LINEAR	SYL · CYB	12 km	MPC; JPL
19690	1999 RD_{212}	—	September 8, 1999	Socorro	LINEAR	·	17 km	MPC; JPL
19691 Iwate	1999 RN_{214}	Iwate	September 5, 1999	Anderson Mesa	LONEOS	PAD	13 km	MPC; JPL
19692	1999 RR_{220}	—	September 5, 1999	Catalina	CSS	·	3.7 km	MPC; JPL
19693	1999 RU_{230}	—	September 8, 1999	Catalina	CSS	EOS	9.8 km	MPC; JPL
19694 Dunkelman	1999 RX_{230}	Dunkelman	September 8, 1999	Catalina	CSS	CYB	15 km	MPC; JPL
19695 Billnye	1999 RP_{234}	Billnye	September 8, 1999	Catalina	CSS	·	4.1 km	MPC; JPL
19696	1999 SW_{1}	—	September 18, 1999	Socorro	LINEAR	URS	14 km	MPC; JPL
19697	1999 SY_{3}	—	September 29, 1999	Višnjan Observatory	K. Korlević	THM	9.0 km	MPC; JPL
19698	1999 SR_{4}	—	September 29, 1999	Višnjan Observatory	K. Korlević	GEF	7.1 km	MPC; JPL
19699	1999 SC_{7}	—	September 29, 1999	Socorro	LINEAR	·	5.1 km	MPC; JPL
19700 Teitelbaum	1999 SG_{15}	Teitelbaum	September 30, 1999	Catalina	CSS	EUN	6.6 km	MPC; JPL

== 19701–19800 ==
back to top

Designation			Discovery			Properties		Ref
Permanent	Provisional	Named after	Date	Site	Discoverer(s)	Category	Diam.	Ref
19701 Aomori	1999 SH_{19}	Aomori	September 29, 1999	Anderson Mesa	LONEOS	HNS	4.0 km	MPC; JPL
19702	1999 SK_{23}	—	September 30, 1999	Socorro	LINEAR	·	12 km	MPC; JPL
19703	1999 TJ_{4}	—	October 3, 1999	Socorro	LINEAR	·	7.3 km	MPC; JPL
19704 Medlock	1999 TU_{8}	Medlock	October 7, 1999	Hudson	Brady, S.	THM	11 km	MPC; JPL
19705	1999 TR_{10}	—	October 7, 1999	Višnjan Observatory	K. Korlević, M. Jurić	·	10 km	MPC; JPL
19706	1999 TU_{11}	—	October 10, 1999	Višnjan Observatory	K. Korlević, M. Jurić	·	17 km	MPC; JPL
19707 Tokunai	1999 TZ_{12}	Tokunai	October 8, 1999	Nanyo	T. Okuni	·	4.9 km	MPC; JPL
19708	1999 TM_{32}	—	October 4, 1999	Socorro	LINEAR	·	3.4 km	MPC; JPL
19709	1999 TT_{105}	—	October 3, 1999	Socorro	LINEAR	EOS	8.0 km	MPC; JPL
19710	1999 TC_{185}	—	October 12, 1999	Socorro	LINEAR	EUN	5.3 km	MPC; JPL
19711 Johnaligawesa	1999 TG_{219}	Johnaligawesa	October 1, 1999	Catalina	CSS	PHO	4.7 km	MPC; JPL
19712	1999 TL_{220}	—	October 1, 1999	Catalina	CSS	·	16 km	MPC; JPL
19713 Ibaraki	1999 TV_{228}	Ibaraki	October 3, 1999	Anderson Mesa	LONEOS	HYG	10 km	MPC; JPL
19714	1999 UD	—	October 16, 1999	Višnjan Observatory	K. Korlević	·	3.3 km	MPC; JPL
19715 Basòdino	1999 UA_{4}	Basòdino	October 27, 1999	Gnosca	S. Sposetti	·	15 km	MPC; JPL
19716	1999 UH_{23}	—	October 28, 1999	Catalina	CSS	·	7.8 km	MPC; JPL
19717	1999 UZ_{40}	—	October 16, 1999	Višnjan Observatory	Višnjan	·	5.3 km	MPC; JPL
19718 Albertjarvis	1999 VF_{2}	Albertjarvis	November 5, 1999	Jornada	Dixon, D. S.	EUN	5.6 km	MPC; JPL
19719 Glasser	1999 VB_{9}	Glasser	November 9, 1999	Fountain Hills	C. W. Juels	·	14 km	MPC; JPL
19720	1999 VP_{10}	—	November 9, 1999	Oizumi	T. Kobayashi	DOR	14 km	MPC; JPL
19721 Wray	1999 VW_{11}	Wray	November 10, 1999	Fountain Hills	C. W. Juels	·	10 km	MPC; JPL
19722	1999 VU_{47}	—	November 3, 1999	Socorro	LINEAR	MAR	4.8 km	MPC; JPL
19723	1999 VG_{87}	—	November 4, 1999	Catalina	CSS	·	4.0 km	MPC; JPL
19724	1999 VR_{114}	—	November 9, 1999	Catalina	CSS	EOS	8.2 km	MPC; JPL
19725	1999 WT_{4}	—	November 28, 1999	Oizumi	T. Kobayashi	L4	32 km	MPC; JPL
19726	1999 XL	—	December 1, 1999	Socorro	LINEAR	·	10 km	MPC; JPL
19727 Allen	1999 XS_{2}	Allen	December 4, 1999	Fountain Hills	C. W. Juels	PHO	5.9 km	MPC; JPL
19728	1999 XQ_{14}	—	December 6, 1999	Socorro	LINEAR	PHO	11 km	MPC; JPL
19729	1999 XZ_{15}	—	December 6, 1999	Višnjan Observatory	K. Korlević	·	4.2 km	MPC; JPL
19730 Machiavelli	1999 XO_{36}	Machiavelli	December 7, 1999	Fountain Hills	C. W. Juels	T_{j} (2.96)	9.7 km	MPC; JPL
19731 Tochigi	1999 XA_{151}	Tochigi	December 9, 1999	Anderson Mesa	LONEOS	·	9.9 km	MPC; JPL
19732	1999 XF_{165}	—	December 8, 1999	Socorro	LINEAR	PHO	9.3 km	MPC; JPL
19733	1999 XA_{166}	—	December 10, 1999	Socorro	LINEAR	EUN	5.9 km	MPC; JPL
19734	1999 XE_{175}	—	December 10, 1999	Socorro	LINEAR	(5)	5.2 km	MPC; JPL
19735	1999 XN_{212}	—	December 14, 1999	Socorro	LINEAR	EUN	5.4 km	MPC; JPL
19736	2000 AM_{51}	—	January 4, 2000	Socorro	LINEAR	EOS	9.2 km	MPC; JPL
19737	2000 AQ_{51}	—	January 4, 2000	Socorro	LINEAR	·	48 km	MPC; JPL
19738 Calinger	2000 AS_{97}	Calinger	January 4, 2000	Socorro	LINEAR	·	3.3 km	MPC; JPL
19739	2000 AL_{104}	—	January 5, 2000	Socorro	LINEAR	·	4.8 km	MPC; JPL
19740	2000 AG_{138}	—	January 5, 2000	Socorro	LINEAR	GEF	5.7 km	MPC; JPL
19741 Callahan	2000 AN_{141}	Callahan	January 5, 2000	Socorro	LINEAR	·	3.9 km	MPC; JPL
19742	2000 AS_{162}	—	January 4, 2000	Socorro	LINEAR	·	4.1 km	MPC; JPL
19743	2000 AF_{164}	—	January 5, 2000	Socorro	LINEAR	EUN	6.4 km	MPC; JPL
19744	2000 AC_{176}	—	January 7, 2000	Socorro	LINEAR	·	11 km	MPC; JPL
19745	2000 AP_{199}	—	January 9, 2000	Socorro	LINEAR	EUN	4.6 km	MPC; JPL
19746	2000 AE_{200}	—	January 9, 2000	Socorro	LINEAR	·	13 km	MPC; JPL
19747	2000 AK_{245}	—	January 9, 2000	Socorro	LINEAR	·	6.9 km	MPC; JPL
19748	2000 BD_{5}	—	January 27, 2000	Socorro	LINEAR	·	19 km	MPC; JPL
19749	2000 CG_{19}	—	February 2, 2000	Socorro	LINEAR	·	6.4 km	MPC; JPL
19750	2000 CM_{62}	—	February 2, 2000	Socorro	LINEAR	MAR	5.9 km	MPC; JPL
19751	2000 CG_{63}	—	February 2, 2000	Socorro	LINEAR	·	3.7 km	MPC; JPL
19752	2000 CH_{67}	—	February 6, 2000	Socorro	LINEAR	T_{j} (2.88)	23 km	MPC; JPL
19753	2000 CL_{94}	—	February 8, 2000	Socorro	LINEAR	·	2.8 km	MPC; JPL
19754 Paclements	2000 CG_{95}	Paclements	February 8, 2000	Socorro	LINEAR	(883)	2.6 km	MPC; JPL
19755	2000 EH_{34}	—	March 5, 2000	Socorro	LINEAR	·	6.7 km	MPC; JPL
19756 Martínezfrías	2000 EW_{50}	Martínezfrías	March 9, 2000	Majorca	Á. López J., R. Pacheco	·	5.2 km	MPC; JPL
19757	2000 GK_{1}	—	April 2, 2000	Socorro	LINEAR	EUN	4.2 km	MPC; JPL
19758 Janelcoulson	2000 GH_{100}	Janelcoulson	April 7, 2000	Socorro	LINEAR	·	2.6 km	MPC; JPL
19759	2000 GU_{146}	—	April 12, 2000	Haleakala	NEAT	EUN	6.2 km	MPC; JPL
19760	2000 GK_{160}	—	April 7, 2000	Socorro	LINEAR	·	11 km	MPC; JPL
19761	2000 JP_{10}	—	May 7, 2000	Socorro	LINEAR	PHO	5.4 km	MPC; JPL
19762 Lacrowder	2000 JQ_{57}	Lacrowder	May 6, 2000	Socorro	LINEAR	·	4.9 km	MPC; JPL
19763 Klimesh	2000 MC	Klimesh	June 18, 2000	Haleakala	NEAT	PHO · slow	7.3 km	MPC; JPL
19764	2000 NF_{5}	—	July 7, 2000	Socorro	LINEAR	AMO +1km	1.6 km	MPC; JPL
19765	2000 NM_{11}	—	July 10, 2000	Valinhos	Valinhos	NYS	4.4 km	MPC; JPL
19766 Katiedavis	2000 OH_{4}	Katiedavis	July 24, 2000	Socorro	LINEAR	V	2.2 km	MPC; JPL
19767	2000 ON_{5}	—	July 24, 2000	Socorro	LINEAR	·	9.8 km	MPC; JPL
19768 Ellendoane	2000 OX_{14}	Ellendoane	July 23, 2000	Socorro	LINEAR	·	3.3 km	MPC; JPL
19769 Dolyniuk	2000 OP_{18}	Dolyniuk	July 23, 2000	Socorro	LINEAR	NYS	3.5 km	MPC; JPL
19770	2000 OP_{22}	—	July 31, 2000	Socorro	LINEAR	·	4.0 km	MPC; JPL
19771	2000 OF_{44}	—	July 30, 2000	Socorro	LINEAR	EUN	6.8 km	MPC; JPL
19772	2000 OU_{46}	—	July 31, 2000	Socorro	LINEAR	·	3.5 km	MPC; JPL
19773	2000 OJ_{50}	—	July 31, 2000	Socorro	LINEAR	EUN · slow	6.3 km	MPC; JPL
19774 Diamondback	2000 OS_{51}	Diamondback	July 30, 2000	Socorro	LINEAR	·	10 km	MPC; JPL
19775 Medmondson	2000 PY	Medmondson	August 1, 2000	Socorro	LINEAR	·	3.5 km	MPC; JPL
19776 Balears	2000 PA_{5}	Balears	August 4, 2000	Ametlla de Mar	J. Nomen	·	3.6 km	MPC; JPL
19777	2000 PU_{7}	—	August 2, 2000	Socorro	LINEAR	EUN	4.7 km	MPC; JPL
19778 Louisgarcia	2000 QE_{29}	Louisgarcia	August 24, 2000	Socorro	LINEAR	KOR	3.4 km	MPC; JPL
19779	2000 QU_{53}	—	August 25, 2000	Socorro	LINEAR	·	4.9 km	MPC; JPL
19780	2000 QE_{65}	—	August 28, 2000	Socorro	LINEAR	EOS	5.9 km	MPC; JPL
19781	2000 QK_{68}	—	August 26, 2000	Črni Vrh	Mikuž, H.	·	6.8 km	MPC; JPL
19782	2000 QT_{68}	—	August 30, 2000	Višnjan Observatory	K. Korlević	·	9.6 km	MPC; JPL
19783 Antoniromanya	2000 QF_{71}	Antoniromanya	August 27, 2000	Ametlla de Mar	J. Nomen	·	13 km	MPC; JPL
19784	2000 QJ_{81}	—	August 24, 2000	Socorro	LINEAR	·	5.4 km	MPC; JPL
19785	2000 QU_{103}	—	August 28, 2000	Socorro	LINEAR	ADE	7.6 km	MPC; JPL
19786	2000 QR_{104}	—	August 28, 2000	Socorro	LINEAR	EOS	6.4 km	MPC; JPL
19787 Betsyglass	2000 QV_{114}	Betsyglass	August 24, 2000	Socorro	LINEAR	·	6.5 km	MPC; JPL
19788 Hunker	2000 QV_{116}	Hunker	August 28, 2000	Socorro	LINEAR	·	8.8 km	MPC; JPL
19789 Susanjohnson	2000 QP_{149}	Susanjohnson	August 24, 2000	Socorro	LINEAR	·	3.1 km	MPC; JPL
19790	2000 RU_{10}	—	September 1, 2000	Socorro	LINEAR	DOR	9.1 km	MPC; JPL
19791	2000 RV_{15}	—	September 1, 2000	Socorro	LINEAR	EOS	7.4 km	MPC; JPL
19792	2000 RO_{33}	—	September 1, 2000	Socorro	LINEAR	·	7.8 km	MPC; JPL
19793	2000 RX_{42}	—	September 3, 2000	Socorro	LINEAR	EUN	8.5 km	MPC; JPL
19794	2000 RV_{49}	—	September 5, 2000	Socorro	LINEAR	PHO	5.4 km	MPC; JPL
19795	2000 RJ_{50}	—	September 5, 2000	Socorro	LINEAR	·	9.6 km	MPC; JPL
19796	2000 RX_{50}	—	September 5, 2000	Socorro	LINEAR	NYS	2.5 km	MPC; JPL
19797	2000 RO_{51}	—	September 5, 2000	Socorro	LINEAR	·	11 km	MPC; JPL
19798	2000 RP_{51}	—	September 5, 2000	Socorro	LINEAR	·	8.5 km	MPC; JPL
19799	2000 RT_{51}	—	September 5, 2000	Socorro	LINEAR	·	6.4 km	MPC; JPL
19800	2000 RX_{51}	—	September 5, 2000	Socorro	LINEAR	THM	8.9 km	MPC; JPL

== 19801–19900 ==
back to top

Designation			Discovery			Properties		Ref
Permanent	Provisional	Named after	Date	Site	Discoverer(s)	Category	Diam.	Ref
19801 Karenlemmon	2000 RZ_{64}	Karenlemmon	September 1, 2000	Socorro	LINEAR	KOR	4.1 km	MPC; JPL
19802	2000 RD_{72}	—	September 2, 2000	Socorro	LINEAR	·	3.4 km	MPC; JPL
19803	2000 RX_{90}	—	September 3, 2000	Socorro	LINEAR	·	3.5 km	MPC; JPL
19804	2000 RY_{103}	—	September 6, 2000	Socorro	LINEAR	EOS	7.0 km	MPC; JPL
19805	2000 SR_{11}	—	September 24, 2000	Višnjan Observatory	K. Korlević	MAS	2.3 km	MPC; JPL
19806 Domatthews	2000 SX_{11}	Domatthews	September 20, 2000	Socorro	LINEAR	·	2.2 km	MPC; JPL
19807	2000 SE_{16}	—	September 23, 2000	Socorro	LINEAR	INA	9.2 km	MPC; JPL
19808 Elainemccall	2000 SN_{85}	Elainemccall	September 24, 2000	Socorro	LINEAR	·	4.4 km	MPC; JPL
19809 Nancyowen	2000 SC_{86}	Nancyowen	September 24, 2000	Socorro	LINEAR	·	3.1 km	MPC; JPL
19810 Partridge	2000 SP_{112}	Partridge	September 24, 2000	Socorro	LINEAR	·	9.4 km	MPC; JPL
19811 Kimperkins	2000 SY_{114}	Kimperkins	September 24, 2000	Socorro	LINEAR	(5)	3.1 km	MPC; JPL
19812	2000 SG_{119}	—	September 24, 2000	Socorro	LINEAR	·	9.6 km	MPC; JPL
19813 Ericsands	2000 SF_{121}	Ericsands	September 24, 2000	Socorro	LINEAR	V	2.0 km	MPC; JPL
19814	2000 ST_{124}	—	September 24, 2000	Socorro	LINEAR	·	3.1 km	MPC; JPL
19815 Marshasega	2000 ST_{127}	Marshasega	September 24, 2000	Socorro	LINEAR	·	5.6 km	MPC; JPL
19816 Wayneseyfert	2000 SO_{128}	Wayneseyfert	September 24, 2000	Socorro	LINEAR	·	2.5 km	MPC; JPL
19817 Larashelton	2000 SK_{145}	Larashelton	September 24, 2000	Socorro	LINEAR	·	4.4 km	MPC; JPL
19818 Shotwell	2000 SB_{150}	Shotwell	September 24, 2000	Socorro	LINEAR	slow	3.8 km	MPC; JPL
19819	2000 SQ_{152}	—	September 24, 2000	Socorro	LINEAR	·	11 km	MPC; JPL
19820 Stowers	2000 ST_{153}	Stowers	September 24, 2000	Socorro	LINEAR	GEF	3.2 km	MPC; JPL
19821 Caroltolin	2000 SU_{154}	Caroltolin	September 24, 2000	Socorro	LINEAR	KOR	5.5 km	MPC; JPL
19822 Vonzielonka	2000 SK_{169}	Vonzielonka	September 23, 2000	Socorro	LINEAR	·	2.8 km	MPC; JPL
19823	2000 SD_{170}	—	September 24, 2000	Socorro	LINEAR	·	4.5 km	MPC; JPL
19824	2000 SL_{176}	—	September 28, 2000	Socorro	LINEAR	·	5.8 km	MPC; JPL
19825	2000 SN_{179}	—	September 28, 2000	Socorro	LINEAR	·	5.2 km	MPC; JPL
19826 Patwalker	2000 SX_{192}	Patwalker	September 24, 2000	Socorro	LINEAR	·	8.3 km	MPC; JPL
19827	2000 SN_{212}	—	September 25, 2000	Socorro	LINEAR	·	8.6 km	MPC; JPL
19828	2000 SB_{214}	—	September 25, 2000	Socorro	LINEAR	PHO	8.5 km	MPC; JPL
19829	2000 SH_{217}	—	September 26, 2000	Socorro	LINEAR	GEF	6.2 km	MPC; JPL
19830	2000 SC_{218}	—	September 26, 2000	Socorro	LINEAR	·	3.8 km	MPC; JPL
19831	2000 SV_{225}	—	September 27, 2000	Socorro	LINEAR	·	4.8 km	MPC; JPL
19832	2000 SS_{226}	—	September 27, 2000	Socorro	LINEAR	·	4.4 km	MPC; JPL
19833 Wickwar	2000 SA_{230}	Wickwar	September 28, 2000	Socorro	LINEAR	·	4.5 km	MPC; JPL
19834	2000 SO_{238}	—	September 26, 2000	Socorro	LINEAR	GEF	5.0 km	MPC; JPL
19835 Zreda	2000 SQ_{252}	Zreda	September 24, 2000	Socorro	LINEAR	·	2.9 km	MPC; JPL
19836	2000 SC_{270}	—	September 27, 2000	Socorro	LINEAR	·	10 km	MPC; JPL
19837	2000 SE_{271}	—	September 27, 2000	Socorro	LINEAR	·	2.7 km	MPC; JPL
19838	2000 SA_{273}	—	September 28, 2000	Socorro	LINEAR	·	4.5 km	MPC; JPL
19839	2000 SW_{275}	—	September 28, 2000	Socorro	LINEAR	·	2.2 km	MPC; JPL
19840	2000 SB_{280}	—	September 27, 2000	Socorro	LINEAR	·	5.7 km	MPC; JPL
19841	2000 SO_{280}	—	September 30, 2000	Socorro	LINEAR	·	3.8 km	MPC; JPL
19842	2000 SU_{298}	—	September 28, 2000	Socorro	LINEAR	DOR	7.5 km	MPC; JPL
19843	2000 SM_{309}	—	September 30, 2000	Socorro	LINEAR	·	2.2 km	MPC; JPL
19844	2000 ST_{317}	—	September 30, 2000	Socorro	LINEAR	L5	38 km	MPC; JPL
19845	2000 SY_{319}	—	September 27, 2000	Socorro	LINEAR	VER	14 km	MPC; JPL
19846	2000 SN_{327}	—	September 30, 2000	Socorro	LINEAR	·	4.8 km	MPC; JPL
19847	2000 ST_{339}	—	September 25, 2000	Kitt Peak	Spacewatch	·	8.5 km	MPC; JPL
19848 Yeungchuchiu	2000 TR	Yeungchuchiu	October 2, 2000	Desert Beaver	W. K. Y. Yeung	EOS	13 km	MPC; JPL
19849	2000 TL_{18}	—	October 1, 2000	Socorro	LINEAR	KOR	4.0 km	MPC; JPL
19850	2000 TQ_{25}	—	October 2, 2000	Socorro	LINEAR	EUN	3.9 km	MPC; JPL
19851	2000 TD_{42}	—	October 1, 2000	Socorro	LINEAR	EOS	7.1 km	MPC; JPL
19852 Jamesalbers	2000 TT_{58}	Jamesalbers	October 2, 2000	Anderson Mesa	LONEOS	·	15 km	MPC; JPL
19853 Ichinomiya	2000 TL_{60}	Ichinomiya	October 2, 2000	Anderson Mesa	LONEOS	·	12 km	MPC; JPL
19854	2000 UV_{5}	—	October 19, 2000	Kitt Peak	Spacewatch	KOR	3.3 km	MPC; JPL
19855 Borisalexeev	2000 UE_{6}	Borisalexeev	October 24, 2000	Socorro	LINEAR	EOS	4.6 km	MPC; JPL
19856	2000 UP_{8}	—	October 24, 2000	Socorro	LINEAR	·	4.5 km	MPC; JPL
19857 Amandajane	2000 UC_{11}	Amandajane	October 19, 2000	Olathe	Robinson, L.	·	3.0 km	MPC; JPL
19858	2000 UT_{18}	—	October 25, 2000	Socorro	LINEAR	·	13 km	MPC; JPL
19859	2000 UK_{22}	—	October 24, 2000	Socorro	LINEAR	·	7.4 km	MPC; JPL
19860 Anahtar	2000 UB_{52}	Anahtar	October 24, 2000	Socorro	LINEAR	·	5.9 km	MPC; JPL
19861 Auster	2000 US_{79}	Auster	October 24, 2000	Socorro	LINEAR	·	4.7 km	MPC; JPL
19862	2556 P-L	—	September 24, 1960	Palomar	C. J. van Houten, I. van Houten-Groeneveld, T. Gehrels	LIX	13 km	MPC; JPL
19863	2725 P-L	—	September 24, 1960	Palomar	C. J. van Houten, I. van Houten-Groeneveld, T. Gehrels	·	3.6 km	MPC; JPL
19864	2775 P-L	—	September 24, 1960	Palomar	C. J. van Houten, I. van Houten-Groeneveld, T. Gehrels	NYS	2.1 km	MPC; JPL
19865	2825 P-L	—	September 24, 1960	Palomar	C. J. van Houten, I. van Houten-Groeneveld, T. Gehrels	·	7.2 km	MPC; JPL
19866	4014 P-L	—	September 24, 1960	Palomar	C. J. van Houten, I. van Houten-Groeneveld, T. Gehrels	·	3.0 km	MPC; JPL
19867	4061 P-L	—	September 24, 1960	Palomar	C. J. van Houten, I. van Houten-Groeneveld, T. Gehrels	HYG	8.5 km	MPC; JPL
19868	4072 P-L	—	September 24, 1960	Palomar	C. J. van Houten, I. van Houten-Groeneveld, T. Gehrels	·	2.7 km	MPC; JPL
19869	4202 P-L	—	September 24, 1960	Palomar	C. J. van Houten, I. van Houten-Groeneveld, T. Gehrels	·	3.9 km	MPC; JPL
19870	4780 P-L	—	September 24, 1960	Palomar	C. J. van Houten, I. van Houten-Groeneveld, T. Gehrels	HYG	10 km	MPC; JPL
19871	6058 P-L	—	September 24, 1960	Palomar	C. J. van Houten, I. van Houten-Groeneveld, T. Gehrels	·	3.1 km	MPC; JPL
19872 Chendonghua	6097 P-L	Chendonghua	September 24, 1960	Palomar	C. J. van Houten, I. van Houten-Groeneveld, T. Gehrels	NYS	2.5 km	MPC; JPL
19873 Chentao	6632 P-L	Chentao	September 24, 1960	Palomar	C. J. van Houten, I. van Houten-Groeneveld, T. Gehrels	KOR	4.8 km	MPC; JPL
19874 Liudongyan	6775 P-L	Liudongyan	September 24, 1960	Palomar	C. J. van Houten, I. van Houten-Groeneveld, T. Gehrels	·	1.9 km	MPC; JPL
19875 Guedes	6791 P-L	Guedes	September 24, 1960	Palomar	C. J. van Houten, I. van Houten-Groeneveld, T. Gehrels	·	4.0 km	MPC; JPL
19876	7637 P-L	—	October 22, 1960	Palomar	C. J. van Houten, I. van Houten-Groeneveld, T. Gehrels	ERI	3.7 km	MPC; JPL
19877	9086 P-L	—	October 17, 1960	Palomar	C. J. van Houten, I. van Houten-Groeneveld, T. Gehrels	·	1.3 km	MPC; JPL
19878	1030 T-1	—	March 25, 1971	Palomar	C. J. van Houten, I. van Houten-Groeneveld, T. Gehrels	·	3.4 km	MPC; JPL
19879	1274 T-1	—	March 25, 1971	Palomar	C. J. van Houten, I. van Houten-Groeneveld, T. Gehrels	·	12 km	MPC; JPL
19880	2247 T-1	—	March 25, 1971	Palomar	C. J. van Houten, I. van Houten-Groeneveld, T. Gehrels	·	5.3 km	MPC; JPL
19881	2288 T-1	—	March 25, 1971	Palomar	C. J. van Houten, I. van Houten-Groeneveld, T. Gehrels	·	4.2 km	MPC; JPL
19882	3024 T-1	—	March 26, 1971	Palomar	C. J. van Houten, I. van Houten-Groeneveld, T. Gehrels	·	3.9 km	MPC; JPL
19883	4058 T-1	—	March 26, 1971	Palomar	C. J. van Houten, I. van Houten-Groeneveld, T. Gehrels	·	2.9 km	MPC; JPL
19884	4125 T-1	—	March 26, 1971	Palomar	C. J. van Houten, I. van Houten-Groeneveld, T. Gehrels	·	3.4 km	MPC; JPL
19885	4283 T-1	—	March 26, 1971	Palomar	C. J. van Houten, I. van Houten-Groeneveld, T. Gehrels	·	3.6 km	MPC; JPL
19886	1167 T-2	—	September 29, 1973	Palomar	C. J. van Houten, I. van Houten-Groeneveld, T. Gehrels	·	3.7 km	MPC; JPL
19887	1279 T-2	—	September 29, 1973	Palomar	C. J. van Houten, I. van Houten-Groeneveld, T. Gehrels	·	2.1 km	MPC; JPL
19888	2048 T-2	—	September 29, 1973	Palomar	C. J. van Houten, I. van Houten-Groeneveld, T. Gehrels	EOS	5.8 km	MPC; JPL
19889	2304 T-2	—	September 29, 1973	Palomar	C. J. van Houten, I. van Houten-Groeneveld, T. Gehrels	·	3.7 km	MPC; JPL
19890	3042 T-2	—	September 30, 1973	Palomar	C. J. van Houten, I. van Houten-Groeneveld, T. Gehrels	·	2.2 km	MPC; JPL
19891	3326 T-2	—	September 25, 1973	Palomar	C. J. van Houten, I. van Houten-Groeneveld, T. Gehrels	·	3.9 km	MPC; JPL
19892	4128 T-2	—	September 29, 1973	Palomar	C. J. van Houten, I. van Houten-Groeneveld, T. Gehrels	·	2.2 km	MPC; JPL
19893	4524 T-2	—	September 30, 1973	Palomar	C. J. van Houten, I. van Houten-Groeneveld, T. Gehrels	·	7.4 km	MPC; JPL
19894	5124 T-2	—	September 25, 1973	Palomar	C. J. van Houten, I. van Houten-Groeneveld, T. Gehrels	EUN	5.3 km	MPC; JPL
19895	5161 T-2	—	September 25, 1973	Palomar	C. J. van Houten, I. van Houten-Groeneveld, T. Gehrels	EUN	5.0 km	MPC; JPL
19896	5366 T-2	—	September 30, 1973	Palomar	C. J. van Houten, I. van Houten-Groeneveld, T. Gehrels	·	4.8 km	MPC; JPL
19897	1097 T-3	—	October 17, 1977	Palomar	C. J. van Houten, I. van Houten-Groeneveld, T. Gehrels	·	4.0 km	MPC; JPL
19898	1177 T-3	—	October 17, 1977	Palomar	C. J. van Houten, I. van Houten-Groeneveld, T. Gehrels	·	8.9 km	MPC; JPL
19899	1188 T-3	—	October 17, 1977	Palomar	C. J. van Houten, I. van Houten-Groeneveld, T. Gehrels	·	3.0 km	MPC; JPL
19900	2172 T-3	—	October 16, 1977	Palomar	C. J. van Houten, I. van Houten-Groeneveld, T. Gehrels	·	7.6 km	MPC; JPL

== 19901–20000 ==
back to top

Designation			Discovery			Properties		Ref
Permanent	Provisional	Named after	Date	Site	Discoverer(s)	Category	Diam.	Ref
19901	2191 T-3	—	October 16, 1977	Palomar	C. J. van Houten, I. van Houten-Groeneveld, T. Gehrels	·	4.6 km	MPC; JPL
19902	3420 T-3	—	October 16, 1977	Palomar	C. J. van Houten, I. van Houten-Groeneveld, T. Gehrels	·	2.5 km	MPC; JPL
19903	3464 T-3	—	October 16, 1977	Palomar	C. J. van Houten, I. van Houten-Groeneveld, T. Gehrels	NYS	2.3 km	MPC; JPL
19904	3487 T-3	—	October 16, 1977	Palomar	C. J. van Houten, I. van Houten-Groeneveld, T. Gehrels	·	4.3 km	MPC; JPL
19905	4086 T-3	—	October 16, 1977	Palomar	C. J. van Houten, I. van Houten-Groeneveld, T. Gehrels	·	1.5 km	MPC; JPL
19906	4138 T-3	—	October 16, 1977	Palomar	C. J. van Houten, I. van Houten-Groeneveld, T. Gehrels	·	12 km	MPC; JPL
19907	4220 T-3	—	October 16, 1977	Palomar	C. J. van Houten, I. van Houten-Groeneveld, T. Gehrels	·	12 km	MPC; JPL
19908	4324 T-3	—	October 16, 1977	Palomar	C. J. van Houten, I. van Houten-Groeneveld, T. Gehrels	·	6.3 km	MPC; JPL
19909	4326 T-3	—	October 16, 1977	Palomar	C. J. van Houten, I. van Houten-Groeneveld, T. Gehrels	·	4.1 km	MPC; JPL
19910	5078 T-3	—	October 16, 1977	Palomar	C. J. van Houten, I. van Houten-Groeneveld, T. Gehrels	EOS	16 km	MPC; JPL
19911 Rigaux	1933 FK	Rigaux	March 26, 1933	Uccle	F. Rigaux	·	18 km	MPC; JPL
19912 Aurapenenta	1955 RE_{1}	Aurapenenta	September 14, 1955	Brooklyn	Indiana University	·	4.1 km	MPC; JPL
19913 Aigyptios	1973 SU_{1}	Aigyptios	September 19, 1973	Palomar	C. J. van Houten, I. van Houten-Groeneveld, T. Gehrels	L4	25 km	MPC; JPL
19914 Klagenfurt	1973 UK_{5}	Klagenfurt	October 27, 1973	Tautenburg Observatory	F. Börngen	NYS ·	6.1 km	MPC; JPL
19915 Bochkarev	1974 RX_{1}	Bochkarev	September 14, 1974	Nauchnij	N. S. Chernykh	·	2.3 km	MPC; JPL
19916 Donbass	1976 QH_{1}	Donbass	August 26, 1976	Nauchnij	N. S. Chernykh	·	3.5 km	MPC; JPL
19917 Dazaifu	1977 EE_{8}	Dazaifu	March 12, 1977	Kiso	H. Kosai, K. Furukawa	CYB	10 km	MPC; JPL
19918 Stavby	1977 PB	Stavby	August 6, 1977	Mount Stromlo	C.-I. Lagerkvist	EUN	7.5 km	MPC; JPL
19919 Pogorelov	1977 TQ_{6}	Pogorelov	October 8, 1977	Nauchnij	L. I. Chernykh	EUN	5.9 km	MPC; JPL
19920	1978 NF	—	July 10, 1978	Palomar	E. F. Helin, E. M. Shoemaker	EUN	3.4 km	MPC; JPL
19921	1978 VV_{3}	—	November 7, 1978	Palomar	E. F. Helin, S. J. Bus	EOS	8.4 km	MPC; JPL
19922	1978 VV_{4}	—	November 7, 1978	Palomar	E. F. Helin, S. J. Bus	·	3.3 km	MPC; JPL
19923	1978 VA_{8}	—	November 6, 1978	Palomar	E. F. Helin, S. J. Bus	THM	8.1 km	MPC; JPL
19924	1979 MQ_{6}	—	June 25, 1979	Siding Spring	E. F. Helin, S. J. Bus	·	2.5 km	MPC; JPL
19925 Juni	1979 QD_{3}	Juni	August 22, 1979	La Silla	C.-I. Lagerkvist	·	1.9 km	MPC; JPL
19926	1979 YQ	—	December 17, 1979	La Silla	H. Debehogne, Netto, E. R.	·	12 km	MPC; JPL
19927 Rogefeldt	1980 FM_{4}	Rogefeldt	March 16, 1980	La Silla	C.-I. Lagerkvist	EOS	6.7 km	MPC; JPL
19928	1981 DB_{3}	—	February 28, 1981	Siding Spring	S. J. Bus	·	5.1 km	MPC; JPL
19929	1981 DL_{3}	—	February 28, 1981	Siding Spring	S. J. Bus	·	2.6 km	MPC; JPL
19930	1981 EV_{2}	—	March 2, 1981	Siding Spring	S. J. Bus	·	6.5 km	MPC; JPL
19931	1981 EF_{3}	—	March 2, 1981	Siding Spring	S. J. Bus	·	1.9 km	MPC; JPL
19932	1981 EU_{4}	—	March 2, 1981	Siding Spring	S. J. Bus	EOS	11 km	MPC; JPL
19933	1981 EW_{5}	—	March 7, 1981	Siding Spring	S. J. Bus	EUN	9.5 km	MPC; JPL
19934	1981 EG_{11}	—	March 1, 1981	Siding Spring	S. J. Bus	(5)	2.2 km	MPC; JPL
19935	1981 EG_{12}	—	March 1, 1981	Siding Spring	S. J. Bus	RAF	3.1 km	MPC; JPL
19936	1981 EZ_{12}	—	March 1, 1981	Siding Spring	S. J. Bus	·	2.8 km	MPC; JPL
19937	1981 EF_{15}	—	March 1, 1981	Siding Spring	S. J. Bus	·	3.8 km	MPC; JPL
19938	1981 EN_{15}	—	March 1, 1981	Siding Spring	S. J. Bus	·	2.1 km	MPC; JPL
19939	1981 EG_{16}	—	March 1, 1981	Siding Spring	S. J. Bus	·	3.5 km	MPC; JPL
19940	1981 EK_{20}	—	March 2, 1981	Siding Spring	S. J. Bus	ADE	6.4 km	MPC; JPL
19941	1981 ES_{24}	—	March 2, 1981	Siding Spring	S. J. Bus	V	1.5 km	MPC; JPL
19942	1981 EV_{24}	—	March 2, 1981	Siding Spring	S. J. Bus	(5)	5.0 km	MPC; JPL
19943	1981 EB_{31}	—	March 2, 1981	Siding Spring	S. J. Bus	·	7.2 km	MPC; JPL
19944	1981 EF_{31}	—	March 2, 1981	Siding Spring	S. J. Bus	·	2.3 km	MPC; JPL
19945	1981 ET_{31}	—	March 2, 1981	Siding Spring	S. J. Bus	·	5.8 km	MPC; JPL
19946	1981 EB_{35}	—	March 2, 1981	Siding Spring	S. J. Bus	·	2.6 km	MPC; JPL
19947	1981 EE_{39}	—	March 2, 1981	Siding Spring	S. J. Bus	·	6.0 km	MPC; JPL
19948	1981 EP_{40}	—	March 2, 1981	Siding Spring	S. J. Bus	·	2.8 km	MPC; JPL
19949	1981 EM_{46}	—	March 2, 1981	Siding Spring	S. J. Bus	·	1.9 km	MPC; JPL
19950	1981 EP_{47}	—	March 2, 1981	Siding Spring	S. J. Bus	EOS	5.1 km	MPC; JPL
19951	1982 UW_{2}	—	October 20, 1982	Kitt Peak	G. Aldering	·	9.4 km	MPC; JPL
19952 Ashkinazi	1982 UV_{6}	Ashkinazi	October 20, 1982	Nauchnij	L. G. Karachkina	·	5.8 km	MPC; JPL
19953 Takeo	1982 VU_{2}	Takeo	November 14, 1982	Kiso	H. Kosai, K. Furukawa	EUN	6.6 km	MPC; JPL
19954 Shigeyoshi	1982 VY_{3}	Shigeyoshi	November 14, 1982	Kiso	H. Kosai, K. Furukawa	·	4.3 km	MPC; JPL
19955 Hollý	1984 WZ_{1}	Hollý	November 28, 1984	Piszkéstető	M. Antal	EOS	7.8 km	MPC; JPL
19956	1985 QW_{1}	—	August 17, 1985	Palomar	E. F. Helin	·	2.7 km	MPC; JPL
19957	1985 QG_{4}	—	August 24, 1985	Smolyan	Bulgarian National Observatory	·	2.3 km	MPC; JPL
19958	1985 RN_{4}	—	September 11, 1985	La Silla	H. Debehogne	·	2.5 km	MPC; JPL
19959 Daisy	1985 UJ_{3}	Daisy	October 17, 1985	Kvistaberg	C.-I. Lagerkvist	·	4.2 km	MPC; JPL
19960	1986 CN_{1}	—	February 3, 1986	La Silla	H. Debehogne	·	4.6 km	MPC; JPL
19961	1986 QP_{3}	—	August 29, 1986	La Silla	H. Debehogne	·	2.8 km	MPC; JPL
19962 Martynenko	1986 RV_{5}	Martynenko	September 7, 1986	Nauchnij	L. I. Chernykh	(2076) · slow	2.6 km	MPC; JPL
19963	1986 TR	—	October 4, 1986	Brorfelde	P. Jensen	·	5.5 km	MPC; JPL
19964	1987 BX_{1}	—	January 25, 1987	La Silla	E. W. Elst	DOR	11 km	MPC; JPL
19965	1987 RO_{1}	—	September 14, 1987	La Silla	H. Debehogne	·	14 km	MPC; JPL
19966	1987 SL_{3}	—	September 25, 1987	Brorfelde	P. Jensen	EOS	8.7 km	MPC; JPL
19967	1987 SN_{12}	—	September 16, 1987	La Silla	H. Debehogne	·	4.0 km	MPC; JPL
19968 Palazzolascaris	1988 FE_{3}	Palazzolascaris	March 19, 1988	La Silla	W. Ferreri	·	11 km	MPC; JPL
19969 Davidfreedman	1988 PR	Davidfreedman	August 11, 1988	Siding Spring	Noymer, A. J.	·	2.8 km	MPC; JPL
19970 Johannpeter	1988 RJ_{3}	Johannpeter	September 8, 1988	Tautenburg Observatory	F. Börngen	NYS ·	7.3 km	MPC; JPL
19971	1988 RZ_{5}	—	September 3, 1988	La Silla	H. Debehogne	·	3.3 km	MPC; JPL
19972	1988 RD_{6}	—	September 5, 1988	La Silla	H. Debehogne	MAS	2.8 km	MPC; JPL
19973	1988 RZ_{10}	—	September 14, 1988	Cerro Tololo	S. J. Bus	·	9.0 km	MPC; JPL
19974	1989 GR_{1}	—	April 3, 1989	La Silla	E. W. Elst	MAR	3.7 km	MPC; JPL
19975	1989 GX_{2}	—	April 3, 1989	La Silla	E. W. Elst	·	3.9 km	MPC; JPL
19976	1989 TD	—	October 4, 1989	Chions	J. M. Baur	·	2.0 km	MPC; JPL
19977	1989 TQ	—	October 7, 1989	Kani	Y. Mizuno, T. Furuta	·	4.3 km	MPC; JPL
19978	1989 TN_{6}	—	October 7, 1989	La Silla	E. W. Elst	·	2.4 km	MPC; JPL
19979	1989 VJ	—	November 2, 1989	Yorii	M. Arai, H. Mori	V	5.5 km	MPC; JPL
19980 Barrysimon	1989 WF_{2}	Barrysimon	November 22, 1989	Palomar	C. S. Shoemaker, D. H. Levy	PHO	3.6 km	MPC; JPL
19981 Bialystock	1989 YB_{6}	Bialystock	December 29, 1989	Haute Provence	E. W. Elst	THB	12 km	MPC; JPL
19982 Barbaradoore	1990 BJ	Barbaradoore	January 22, 1990	Palomar	E. F. Helin	PHO	4.7 km	MPC; JPL
19983 Inagekiyokazu	1990 DW	Inagekiyokazu	February 18, 1990	Kushiro	Matsuyama, M., K. Watanabe	slow	4.4 km	MPC; JPL
19984	1990 EP_{2}	—	March 2, 1990	La Silla	E. W. Elst	·	2.9 km	MPC; JPL
19985	1990 GD	—	April 15, 1990	La Silla	E. W. Elst	·	3.5 km	MPC; JPL
19986	1990 KD	—	May 20, 1990	Siding Spring	R. H. McNaught	·	7.5 km	MPC; JPL
19987	1990 QJ_{3}	—	August 28, 1990	Palomar	H. E. Holt	·	6.1 km	MPC; JPL
19988	1990 QW_{3}	—	August 22, 1990	Palomar	H. E. Holt	·	2.0 km	MPC; JPL
19989	1990 RN_{8}	—	September 15, 1990	La Silla	H. Debehogne	·	3.6 km	MPC; JPL
19990	1990 SE_{8}	—	September 22, 1990	La Silla	E. W. Elst	AGN	3.0 km	MPC; JPL
19991	1990 SW_{8}	—	September 22, 1990	La Silla	E. W. Elst	·	4.5 km	MPC; JPL
19992 Schönbein	1990 TS_{9}	Schönbein	October 10, 1990	Tautenburg Observatory	F. Börngen, L. D. Schmadel	·	9.0 km	MPC; JPL
19993 Günterseeber	1990 TK_{10}	Günterseeber	October 10, 1990	Tautenburg Observatory	L. D. Schmadel, F. Börngen	(5)	3.6 km	MPC; JPL
19994 Tresini	1990 TJ_{15}	Tresini	October 13, 1990	Nauchnij	L. G. Karachkina, G. R. Kastelʹ	GEF	5.2 km	MPC; JPL
19995	1990 VU_{8}	—	November 12, 1990	La Silla	E. W. Elst	GEF	5.8 km	MPC; JPL
19996	1990 WZ	—	November 18, 1990	La Silla	E. W. Elst	·	9.4 km	MPC; JPL
19997	1990 WM_{1}	—	November 18, 1990	La Silla	E. W. Elst	·	3.7 km	MPC; JPL
19998 Binoche	1990 WP_{1}	Binoche	November 18, 1990	La Silla	E. W. Elst	GEF	4.1 km	MPC; JPL
19999 Depardieu	1991 BJ_{1}	Depardieu	January 18, 1991	Haute Provence	E. W. Elst	·	3.5 km	MPC; JPL
20000 Varuna	2000 WR_{106}	Varuna	November 28, 2000	Kitt Peak	Spacewatch	cubewano (hot)	900 km	MPC; JPL

back to top

== See also ==
- Meanings of minor-planet names: 19001–20000
