= 19741 Callahan =

Main-belt asteroid

Discovery
- Discovered by: LINEAR
- Discovery site: Lincoln Lab ETS
- Discovery date: 5 January 2000

Designations
- Named after: Diane Callahan (mentor at DCYSC)
- Alternative designations: 2000 AN_{141} · 1978 RQ_{8}
- Minor planet category: main-belt · (inner) background

Orbital characteristics
- Epoch 4 September 2017 (JD 2458000.5)
- Uncertainty parameter 0
- Observation arc: 38.66 yr (14,121 days)
- Aphelion: 2.5407 AU
- Perihelion: 1.9559 AU
- Semi-major axis: 2.2483 AU
- Eccentricity: 0.1301
- Orbital period (sidereal): 3.37 yr (1,231 days)
- Mean anomaly: 163.76°
- Mean motion: 0° 17^{m} 32.64^{s} / day
- Inclination: 8.0506°
- Longitude of ascending node: 167.39°
- Argument of perihelion: 227.28°

Physical characteristics
- Dimensions: 3.12 km (calculated); 3.876±0.166 km
- Synodic rotation period: 7.2684±0.0015 h
- Geometric albedo: 0.20 (assumed); 0.224±0.044
- Spectral type: S
- Absolute magnitude (H): 14.3 · 14.4 · 14.444±0.004 · 14.89

19741 Callahan (provisional designation 2000 AN_{141}) is a stony background asteroid from the inner regions of the asteroid belt, approximately 3.5 kilometers in diameter.

It was discovered on 5 January 2000, by the Lincoln Near-Earth Asteroid Research, LINEAR, at the Lincoln Laboratory's Experimental Test Site, Socorro, New Mexico, and named after a mentor of the 2003 Discovery Channel Young Scientist Challenge.

== Orbit and classification ==
The S-type asteroid orbits the Sun in the inner main-belt at a distance of 2.0–2.5 AU once every 3 years and 4 months (1,231 days). Its orbit has an eccentricity of 0.13 and an inclination of 8° with respect to the ecliptic. Callahan was first identified as 1978 RQ8 at ESO's La Silla Observatory in 1978, which extends the asteroid's observation arc by 22 years prior to its official discovery observation.

== Physical characteristics ==
In December 2009, a rotational lightcurve for this asteroid was obtained from photometric observations at the U.S. Palomar Transient Factory, California. It gave a rotation period of 7.2684±0.0015 hours with a relatively high brightness variation of 0.81 in magnitude (U=2), indicative of a non-spherical shape.

According to the survey carried out by the NEOWISE mission of NASA's Wide-field Infrared Survey Explorer, Callahan measures 3.9 kilometers in diameter and its surface has an albedo of 0.22. The Collaborative Asteroid Lightcurve Link assumes a standard albedo for stony asteroids of 0.20 and calculates a diameter of 3.1 kilometers, with an absolute magnitude of 14.89.

== Naming ==
This minor planet was named after Diane Callahan, teacher at U.S. Fairfield Middle School, Ohio, who mentored a finalist in the 2003 Discovery Channel Youth Science Challenge (DCYSC), a middle school science competition. The approved naming citation was published by the Minor Planet Center on 10 October 2003 (M.P.C. 49772).
