= 19738 Calinger =

Main-belt asteroid

Discovery
- Discovered by: LINEAR
- Discovery site: Lincoln Lab's ETS
- Discovery date: 4 January 2000

Designations
- Named after: Manetta Calinger (DCYSC mentor)
- Alternative designations: 2000 AS_{97} · 1991 RZ_{36}
- Minor planet category: main-belt · inner background

Orbital characteristics
- Epoch 4 September 2017 (JD 2458000.5)
- Uncertainty parameter 0
- Observation arc: 26.88 yr (9,819 days)
- Aphelion: 2.7043 AU
- Perihelion: 1.8606 AU
- Semi-major axis: 2.2824 AU
- Eccentricity: 0.1848
- Orbital period (sidereal): 3.45 yr (1,260 days)
- Mean anomaly: 165.65°
- Mean motion: 0° 17^{m} 8.88^{s} / day
- Inclination: 7.7356°
- Longitude of ascending node: 90.753°
- Argument of perihelion: 280.16°

Physical characteristics
- Dimensions: 3.272±0.082
- Geometric albedo: 0.314±0.056
- Absolute magnitude (H): 14.1

19738 Calinger (provisional designation 2000 AS_{97}) is a background asteroid from the inner regions of the asteroid belt, approximately 3 kilometers in diameter.

It was discovered on 4 January 2000, by members of the Lincoln Near-Earth Asteroid Research team at Lincoln Laboratory's Experimental Test Site in Socorro, New Mexico, and named after DCYSC-mentor Manetta Calinger.

== Classification and orbit ==
Calinger is a non-family asteroid from the main belt's background population. It orbits the Sun in the inner asteroid belt at a distance of 1.9–2.7 AU once every 3 years and 5 months (1,260 days). Its orbit has an eccentricity of 0.18 and an inclination of 8° with respect to the ecliptic.

The body's observation arc begins almost 10 years prior to its official discovery observation, with a precovery from the Digitized Sky Survey taken at Palomar Observatory in May 1990.

== Physical characteristics ==
According to the surveys carried out by the Infrared Astronomical Satellite IRAS, the Japanese Akari satellite, and NASA's Wide-field Infrared Survey Explorer with its subsequent NEOWISE mission, Calinger measures 3.272 kilometers in diameter and its surface has a high albedo of 0.314. It has an absolute magnitude of 14.1.

=== Lightcurves ===
As of 2017, Calinger's rotation period and shape remain unknown.

== Naming ==
This minor planet was named after Manetta Calinger who mentored a finalist in the 2003 Discovery Channel Youth Science Challenge, DCYSC. The approved naming citation was published by the Minor Planet Center on 10 October 2003 (M.P.C. 49772).
