= 19763 Klimesh =

Main-belt asteroid

Discovery
- Discovered by: NEAT
- Discovery site: Haleakala Obs.
- Discovery date: 18 June 2000

Designations
- Named after: Matthew Klimesh (NEAT team member)
- Alternative designations: 2000 MC · 1998 AX_{10}
- Minor planet category: main-belt · Phocaea

Orbital characteristics
- Epoch 4 September 2017 (JD 2458000.5)
- Uncertainty parameter 0
- Observation arc: 31.56 yr (11,526 days)
- Aphelion: 2.8640 AU
- Perihelion: 1.9179 AU
- Semi-major axis: 2.3910 AU
- Eccentricity: 0.1978
- Orbital period (sidereal): 3.70 yr (1,350 days)
- Mean anomaly: 216.28°
- Mean motion: 0° 15^{m} 59.76^{s} / day
- Inclination: 23.298°
- Longitude of ascending node: 287.18°
- Argument of perihelion: 56.652°

Physical characteristics
- Dimensions: 5.65±0.88 km 7.270±0.138 km 7.29 km (taken); 7.291 km
- Synodic rotation period: 4.4178±0.0001 h 101 h (Note: Pravec (2001): lightcurve plot of (19763) Klimesh with a rotation period 101 hours and a brightness amplitude of 0.67 mag. Analysis is based on an absolute magnitude of 12.78±0.12. It has a Quality Code of 2, which denotes a "good determination, pole likely correct to ±15-20°, but may be ambiguous with two or more solutions that are possible, or the sense of rotation is not determined". Summary figures at Collaborative Asteroid Lightcurve Link (CALL))
- Geometric albedo: 0.1635; 0.175±0.046; 0.24±0.07
- Spectral type: S
- Absolute magnitude (H): 12.9 · 12.78±0.12 · 13.2 · 13.27±0.13 · 12.89±0.28 · 13.18

19763 Klimesh (provisional designation 2000 MC) is a stony Phocaea asteroid and slow rotator from the inner regions of the asteroid belt, approximately 7 kilometers in diameter. Discovered by NEAT at Haleakala Observatory in 2000, the asteroid was named for NEAT's software specialist Matthew Klimesh.

== Discovery ==
Klimesh was discovered on 18 June 2000, by NASA's and JPL's Near-Earth Asteroid Tracking program (NEAT) with the Maui Space Surveillance System (MSSS) at the Haleakala Observatory site on the island of Maui, Hawaii, in the United States. The body's observation arc begins 15 years prior to its official discovery observation, with a precovery from the Digitized Sky Survey taken at the Australian Siding Spring Observatory in September 1985.

== Orbit and classification ==
This asteroid is a member of the Phocaea family (701), a group of asteroids with similar orbital characteristics. It orbits the Sun in the inner main-belt at a distance of 1.9–2.9 AU once every 3 years and 8 months (1,350 days). Its orbit has an eccentricity of 0.20 and an inclination of 23° with respect to the ecliptic.

== Physical characteristics ==
Klimesh has been characterized as a stony S-type asteroid. It possibly rotates chaotically.

=== Slow rotator ===
Klimesh is a slow rotator, as it has a rotation period of 101 hours with a brightness variation of 0.67 magnitude. The photometric observations were made by Czech astronomer Petr Pravec at the Ondřejov Observatory during the asteroid's 2011-opposition (U=2).

The result supersedes a period of 4.4 hours with an amplitude of 0.12, obtained from a fragmentary lightcurve by Italian astronomer Silvano Casulli (U=1).

=== Diameter and albedo ===
According to the survey carried out by the NEOWISE mission of NASA's Wide-field Infrared Survey Explorer, Klimesh has a diameter of 5.65 and 7.27 kilometers with an albedo of 0.24 and 0.175, respectively. The Collaborative Asteroid Lightcurve Link adopts Petr Pravec's revised WISE-data, that is, an albedo of 0.1635 and a diameter of 7.29 kilometers with an absolute magnitude of 13.27.

== Naming ==
This minor planet was named after JPL researcher Matthew Klimesh (born 1968), developer of the compression algorithm used for handling the vast amount of data obtained by the discovering NEAT program. Since 1996 at JPL's Communications Systems and Research Section, his work includes data compression, rate–distortion theory and channel coding. The official naming citation was published by the Minor Planet Center on 9 May 2001 (M.P.C. 42677).
