= Macy =

Macy may refer to:

== People and fictional characters ==
- Macy (given name), a list of people and fictional characters
- Macy (surname), a list of people

== Places ==
=== Antarctica ===
- Macy Glacier, West Antarctica

=== United States ===
- Macy, Indiana, a town
- Macy, Maine, a village
- Macy, Nebraska, a census-designated place

== See also ==
- Macy's, American department store chain
- Macy conferences, meetings of scholars to set the foundations for a general science of the workings of the human mind
- Macyville, Kansas, an unincorporated community
- Macey (disambiguation)
