= Masi =

Masi may refer to:

== Places ==
- Masi, Almora, a small town in Almora, India
- Masi, Veneto, a city in the province of Padua, Italy
- Masi, Norway, a village in Finnmark county, Norway

== People ==
- Masi (surname)
- De Masi, a surname
- Masi Oka, Japanese actor

== Other ==
- Masi (Fiji), the Fijian term for the paper mulberry tree
  - Fijian name for Tapa cloth, made from the bark of the paper mulberry
- Masi (food), a Filipino dessert made from rice flour balls with a peanut filling
- Masi (india ink), an archaic term for India ink
- Masi (month), eleventh month of the Tamil calendar
- Masi Bicycles, a bicycle manufacturer
- MASI index (Moroccan All Shares Index), a Casablanca Stock Exchange index
- MASI Lugano, a Swiss contemporary art museum
- Masimo, a medical technology company publicly traded as "MASI"
- Movement of Asylum Seekers in Ireland
- Sisu SA-150, a Finnish military truck colloquially known as Maasto-Sisu or Masi for short

== See also ==
- Masa (disambiguation)
- Maci (disambiguation)
- Maasi, a village in Estonia
- Maasi (film), a 2012 Tamil-language film
