= Macy (given name) =

- Pronunciation: MAY-see
- Gender: Female

Origin
- Origin: Old French
- Meaning: Weapon
- Region of origin: Gaul

Other names
- Related names: Macey, Lacy, Lacey, Maci

Macy is a female given name based on the surname Macy, which is itself derived from a French place name meaning "Maccius' estate". Other spelling variations of the name include Macie, Macey, and Maci. The name's popularity increased after Rowland Macy founded the Macy's chain of department stores. The name Macy may refer to:

== People ==
- Macy Chan (born 1981), Hong Kong actress
- Macy DuBois (1929–2007), Canadian architect
- Macy Gray (born 1967), American singer
- Macy Morse (1921–2019), American political activist
- Macy Nulman (1923–2011), American scholar
- Macy Rodman (born 1989), American singer-songwriter and comedian

== Fiction ==
- Macy Alexander, fictional character on the American television series The Bold and the Beautiful
- Macy Halbert, a character in Nexo Knights
- Macy Misa, a fictional character in the Disney Channel series, Jonas
- Macy Struthers, a character from the 1981 musical satire film Shock Treatment
- Macy Vaughn, fictional character from the 2018 reboot series Charmed

== See also ==
- Macy (surname)
- Macy's, American department store chain
- Maisie (given name)
