= Masi (surname) =

Masi is a surname. Notable people with the surname include:

- Alberto Masi (born 1992), Italian footballer
- Alex Masi, Italian musician
- Andrea Masi, Italian rugby player
- Andy Masi, American entrepreneur, real estate developer, and business executive
- Angela Masi (born 1987), Italian politician
- Aristides Masi (born 1977), former Paraguayan footballer
- Binta Masi Garba (born 1967), Nigerian politician, businesswoman and administrator
- Denis Masi (born 1942), British artist
- Esala Masi (born 1974), retired Fijian footballer
- Federico Masi (born 1990), Italian footballer
- Gianluca Masi, Italian astrophysicist
- Giuseppe Di Masi (born 1981), Italian footballer
- Julie Masi, Canadian musician
- Kitso Masi (born 1984), Motswana actor
- Lance de Masi (born 1949), president of the American University in Dubai
- Manoa Masi (born 1974), former Fijian professional footballer
- Mattia Masi (born 1984), Sammarinese footballer
- Michael Masi (born 1978), former Formula One race director.
- Phil Masi, American baseball player
- Reni Masi (1933–2020), Canadian politician
- Sébastien Masi, French Michelin-starred head chef in Ireland
- Seraphim Masi (1797–1884), American silversmith

== See also ==
- De Masi, people with this surname
