= List of minor planets: 619001–620000 =

The following is a partial list of minor planets, running from minor-planet number 619001 through 620000, inclusive. The primary data for this and other partial lists is based on JPL's "Small-Body Orbital Elements" and data available from the Minor Planet Center. Critical list information is also provided by the MPC, unless otherwise specified from Lowell Observatory. A detailed description of the table's columns and additional sources are given on the main page including a complete list of every page in this series, and a statistical break-up on the dynamical classification of minor planets.

Also see the summary list of all named bodies in numerical and alphabetical order, and the corresponding naming citations for the number range of this particular list. New namings may only be added to this list after official publication, as the preannouncement of names is condemned by the Working Group for Small Bodies Nomenclature of the International Astronomical Union.

Near-Earth obj.	MBA (inner)	MBA (outer)	Centaur
Mars-crosser	MBA (middle)	Jupiter trojan	Trans-Neptunian obj.
Unclassified

== 619001–619100 ==
Designation			Discovery			Properties		Ref
Permanent	Provisional	Named after	Date	Site	Discoverer(s)	Category	Diam.	Ref
619001	2005 EH_{115}	—	March 4, 2005	Mount Lemmon	Mount Lemmon Survey	·	1.6 km	MPC; JPL
619002	2005 EH_{142}	—	March 10, 2005	Kitt Peak	Spacewatch	KON	1.9 km	MPC; JPL
619003	2005 ES_{164}	—	September 12, 2002	Palomar	NEAT	KOR	1.5 km	MPC; JPL
619004	2005 ED_{230}	—	March 10, 2005	Mount Lemmon	Mount Lemmon Survey	·	1.2 km	MPC; JPL
619005	2005 EW_{234}	—	March 10, 2005	Mount Lemmon	Mount Lemmon Survey	·	1.6 km	MPC; JPL
619006	2005 EG_{262}	—	September 10, 2007	Mount Lemmon	Mount Lemmon Survey	·	1.1 km	MPC; JPL
619007	2005 EB_{263}	—	March 13, 2005	Kitt Peak	Spacewatch	·	430 m	MPC; JPL
619008	2005 EE_{294}	—	March 11, 2005	Mount Lemmon	Mount Lemmon Survey	·	1.6 km	MPC; JPL
619009	2005 EF_{329}	—	December 4, 2008	Kitt Peak	Spacewatch	·	1.6 km	MPC; JPL
619010	2005 ET_{336}	—	March 12, 2005	Mount Lemmon	Mount Lemmon Survey	·	640 m	MPC; JPL
619011	2005 EL_{337}	—	February 15, 2010	Catalina	CSS	·	3.2 km	MPC; JPL
619012	2005 ER_{343}	—	May 3, 2016	Mount Lemmon	Mount Lemmon Survey	KOR	1.3 km	MPC; JPL
619013	2005 EA_{344}	—	May 11, 2015	Mount Lemmon	Mount Lemmon Survey	·	600 m	MPC; JPL
619014	2005 EA_{347}	—	October 7, 2013	Mount Lemmon	Mount Lemmon Survey	·	550 m	MPC; JPL
619015	2005 EK_{348}	—	March 14, 2005	Mount Lemmon	Mount Lemmon Survey	EOS	1.3 km	MPC; JPL
619016	2005 EW_{350}	—	March 10, 2005	Mount Lemmon	Mount Lemmon Survey	·	1.4 km	MPC; JPL
619017	2005 FB_{18}	—	December 2, 2008	Mount Lemmon	Mount Lemmon Survey	EOS	2.2 km	MPC; JPL
619018	2005 GB_{25}	—	March 13, 2005	Kitt Peak	Spacewatch	·	1.6 km	MPC; JPL
619019	2005 GQ_{41}	—	March 16, 2005	Kitt Peak	Spacewatch	H	370 m	MPC; JPL
619020	2005 GP_{54}	—	March 17, 2005	Kitt Peak	Spacewatch	·	2.2 km	MPC; JPL
619021	2005 GD_{96}	—	April 6, 2005	Kitt Peak	Spacewatch	·	580 m	MPC; JPL
619022	2005 GO_{122}	—	March 12, 2005	Kitt Peak	Spacewatch	·	1.6 km	MPC; JPL
619023	2005 GL_{125}	—	April 2, 2005	Mount Lemmon	Mount Lemmon Survey	H	430 m	MPC; JPL
619024	2005 GZ_{191}	—	April 2, 2005	Kitt Peak	Spacewatch	·	550 m	MPC; JPL
619025	2005 GO_{218}	—	March 8, 2005	Mount Lemmon	Mount Lemmon Survey	·	1.7 km	MPC; JPL
619026	2005 GK_{231}	—	February 8, 2008	Kitt Peak	Spacewatch	·	550 m	MPC; JPL
619027	2005 GP_{231}	—	April 11, 2005	Mount Lemmon	Mount Lemmon Survey	·	670 m	MPC; JPL
619028	2005 GA_{232}	—	April 2, 2005	Kitt Peak	Spacewatch	·	1.8 km	MPC; JPL
619029	2005 GG_{232}	—	October 8, 2012	Haleakala	Pan-STARRS 1	·	1.7 km	MPC; JPL
619030	2005 GB_{236}	—	April 6, 2005	Kitt Peak	Spacewatch	·	470 m	MPC; JPL
619031	2005 GC_{240}	—	April 5, 2005	Kitt Peak	Spacewatch	EOS	1.9 km	MPC; JPL
619032	2005 JV_{58}	—	May 8, 2005	Kitt Peak	Spacewatch	EOS	1.7 km	MPC; JPL
619033	2005 JC_{69}	—	May 6, 2005	Kitt Peak	Spacewatch	MAR	890 m	MPC; JPL
619034	2005 JT_{108}	—	May 14, 2005	Siding Spring	SSS	APO	530 m	MPC; JPL
619035	2005 JR_{129}	—	May 13, 2005	Kitt Peak	Spacewatch	·	1.7 km	MPC; JPL
619036	2005 JV_{141}	—	October 18, 2012	Haleakala	Pan-STARRS 1	·	2.2 km	MPC; JPL
619037	2005 JK_{154}	—	May 4, 2005	Mount Lemmon	Mount Lemmon Survey	·	1.9 km	MPC; JPL
619038	2005 JM_{162}	—	May 8, 2005	Kitt Peak	Spacewatch	·	2.2 km	MPC; JPL
619039	2005 JD_{192}	—	January 17, 2015	Haleakala	Pan-STARRS 1	·	2.0 km	MPC; JPL
619040	2005 JE_{194}	—	October 8, 2012	Kitt Peak	Spacewatch	·	1.3 km	MPC; JPL
619041	2005 JG_{195}	—	May 10, 2005	Mount Lemmon	Mount Lemmon Survey	·	2.2 km	MPC; JPL
619042	2005 KH_{16}	—	May 20, 2005	Mount Lemmon	Mount Lemmon Survey	·	1.9 km	MPC; JPL
619043	2005 LY_{10}	—	June 3, 2005	Kitt Peak	Spacewatch	BRG	1.2 km	MPC; JPL
619044	2005 LQ_{12}	—	June 8, 2005	Kitt Peak	Spacewatch	·	420 m	MPC; JPL
619045	2005 LT_{14}	—	April 30, 2005	Kitt Peak	Spacewatch	·	560 m	MPC; JPL
619046	2005 LA_{58}	—	March 9, 2015	Mount Lemmon	Mount Lemmon Survey	·	3.2 km	MPC; JPL
619047	2005 LT_{58}	—	January 29, 2014	Catalina	CSS	EUP	2.8 km	MPC; JPL
619048	2005 LD_{59}	—	June 1, 2005	Mount Lemmon	Mount Lemmon Survey	·	1.0 km	MPC; JPL
619049	2005 MN_{27}	—	June 29, 2005	Kitt Peak	Spacewatch	·	570 m	MPC; JPL
619050	2005 MZ_{49}	—	June 30, 2005	Kitt Peak	Spacewatch	THM	2.5 km	MPC; JPL
619051	2005 MG_{56}	—	July 28, 2008	Mount Lemmon	Mount Lemmon Survey	H	440 m	MPC; JPL
619052	2005 NJ_{19}	—	July 5, 2005	Mount Lemmon	Mount Lemmon Survey	·	560 m	MPC; JPL
619053	2005 NL_{57}	—	July 5, 2005	Mount Lemmon	Mount Lemmon Survey	·	1.6 km	MPC; JPL
619054	2005 NX_{58}	—	July 9, 2005	Kitt Peak	Spacewatch	MAR	1 km	MPC; JPL
619055	2005 NU_{68}	—	July 3, 2005	Mount Lemmon	Mount Lemmon Survey	·	1.2 km	MPC; JPL
619056	2005 NR_{73}	—	July 9, 2005	Kitt Peak	Spacewatch	·	1.7 km	MPC; JPL
619057	2005 NB_{93}	—	June 13, 2005	Mount Lemmon	Mount Lemmon Survey	·	3.1 km	MPC; JPL
619058	2005 NE_{95}	—	July 6, 2005	Kitt Peak	Spacewatch	(5)	1.0 km	MPC; JPL
619059	2005 NR_{95}	—	July 7, 2005	Kitt Peak	Spacewatch	EOS	2.1 km	MPC; JPL
619060	2005 NE_{103}	—	July 7, 2005	Mauna Kea	Veillet, C.	EOS	1.4 km	MPC; JPL
619061	2005 NN_{108}	—	July 7, 2005	Mauna Kea	Veillet, C.	·	1.1 km	MPC; JPL
619062	2005 NZ_{109}	—	June 14, 2005	Mount Lemmon	Mount Lemmon Survey	·	1.1 km	MPC; JPL
619063	2005 NO_{119}	—	July 7, 2005	Mauna Kea	Veillet, C.	URS	2.4 km	MPC; JPL
619064	2005 NZ_{126}	—	July 12, 2005	Mount Lemmon	Mount Lemmon Survey	·	2.3 km	MPC; JPL
619065	2005 NK_{127}	—	January 30, 2008	Mount Lemmon	Mount Lemmon Survey	·	2.5 km	MPC; JPL
619066	2005 NU_{127}	—	July 1, 2014	Mount Lemmon	Mount Lemmon Survey	HNS	1.2 km	MPC; JPL
619067	2005 ND_{128}	—	December 13, 2014	Haleakala	Pan-STARRS 1	·	980 m	MPC; JPL
619068	2005 NL_{128}	—	July 3, 2016	Mount Lemmon	Mount Lemmon Survey	·	2.2 km	MPC; JPL
619069	2005 NM_{129}	—	July 6, 2016	Haleakala	Pan-STARRS 1	·	3.0 km	MPC; JPL
619070	2005 NQ_{130}	—	November 6, 2010	Mount Lemmon	Mount Lemmon Survey	·	1.0 km	MPC; JPL
619071	2005 OV_{32}	—	July 28, 2005	Palomar	NEAT	·	690 m	MPC; JPL
619072	2005 OX_{32}	—	February 23, 2011	Kitt Peak	Spacewatch	PHO	810 m	MPC; JPL
619073	2005 OM_{33}	—	July 30, 2005	Palomar	NEAT	·	690 m	MPC; JPL
619074	2005 PW_{29}	—	August 5, 2005	Palomar	NEAT	·	2.4 km	MPC; JPL
619075	2005 PW_{30}	—	June 20, 2015	Haleakala	Pan-STARRS 1	·	710 m	MPC; JPL
619076	2005 PX_{31}	—	September 25, 2014	Mount Lemmon	Mount Lemmon Survey	·	1.4 km	MPC; JPL
619077	2005 QN_{1}	—	July 31, 2005	Palomar	NEAT	KON	2.1 km	MPC; JPL
619078	2005 QJ_{15}	—	July 29, 2005	Palomar	NEAT	·	2.1 km	MPC; JPL
619079	2005 QP_{37}	—	August 25, 2005	Palomar	NEAT	·	1.3 km	MPC; JPL
619080	2005 QA_{45}	—	August 28, 2005	Anderson Mesa	LONEOS	·	1.0 km	MPC; JPL
619081	2005 QA_{48}	—	August 28, 2005	Kitt Peak	Spacewatch	·	560 m	MPC; JPL
619082	2005 QM_{62}	—	August 26, 2005	Palomar	NEAT	HYG	2.6 km	MPC; JPL
619083	2005 QY_{71}	—	August 29, 2005	Anderson Mesa	LONEOS	·	510 m	MPC; JPL
619084	2005 QP_{104}	—	August 31, 2005	Kitt Peak	Spacewatch	·	2.7 km	MPC; JPL
619085	2005 QG_{112}	—	August 31, 2005	Kitt Peak	Spacewatch	EOS	1.9 km	MPC; JPL
619086	2005 QU_{113}	—	August 30, 2005	Kitt Peak	Spacewatch	·	470 m	MPC; JPL
619087	2005 QT_{132}	—	August 28, 2005	Kitt Peak	Spacewatch	VER	2.3 km	MPC; JPL
619088	2005 QY_{169}	—	August 31, 2005	Socorro	LINEAR	·	2.9 km	MPC; JPL
619089	2005 QA_{171}	—	August 31, 2005	Anderson Mesa	LONEOS	·	1.1 km	MPC; JPL
619090	2005 QR_{179}	—	August 26, 2005	Anderson Mesa	LONEOS	·	670 m	MPC; JPL
619091	2005 QC_{192}	—	August 27, 2005	Palomar	NEAT	EUN	990 m	MPC; JPL
619092	2005 QU_{197}	—	September 26, 2012	Mount Lemmon	Mount Lemmon Survey	·	700 m	MPC; JPL
619093	2005 QW_{198}	—	February 8, 2008	Kitt Peak	Spacewatch	(58892)	2.4 km	MPC; JPL
619094	2005 QA_{203}	—	January 18, 2008	Kitt Peak	Spacewatch	·	2.7 km	MPC; JPL
619095	2005 QB_{208}	—	August 27, 2005	Palomar	NEAT	·	1.1 km	MPC; JPL
619096	2005 RE_{5}	—	July 27, 2005	Palomar	NEAT	·	3.4 km	MPC; JPL
619097	2005 RX_{10}	—	August 27, 2005	Palomar	NEAT	PHO	800 m	MPC; JPL
619098	2005 RU_{37}	—	September 3, 2005	Mauna Kea	Veillet, C.	·	2.7 km	MPC; JPL
619099	2005 RN_{50}	—	October 31, 2006	Mount Lemmon	Mount Lemmon Survey	·	2.5 km	MPC; JPL
619100	2005 RT_{52}	—	September 13, 2005	Catalina	CSS	THB	2.8 km	MPC; JPL

== 619101–619200 ==
back to top

Designation			Discovery			Properties		Ref
Permanent	Provisional	Named after	Date	Site	Discoverer(s)	Category	Diam.	Ref
619101	2005 RF_{53}	—	September 1, 2005	Palomar	NEAT	·	940 m	MPC; JPL
619102	2005 RS_{54}	—	September 13, 2005	Kitt Peak	Spacewatch	·	2.4 km	MPC; JPL
619103	2005 RA_{55}	—	September 4, 2011	Haleakala	Pan-STARRS 1	·	2.1 km	MPC; JPL
619104	2005 RJ_{56}	—	September 13, 2005	Kitt Peak	Spacewatch	·	520 m	MPC; JPL
619105	2005 RX_{57}	—	November 17, 2014	Haleakala	Pan-STARRS 1	·	1.1 km	MPC; JPL
619106	2005 SQ	—	September 22, 2005	Palomar	NEAT	APO · PHA	340 m	MPC; JPL
619107	2005 SN_{58}	—	September 26, 2005	Calvin-Rehoboth	L. A. Molnar	·	2.1 km	MPC; JPL
619108	2005 SZ_{91}	—	September 24, 2005	Kitt Peak	Spacewatch	·	520 m	MPC; JPL
619109	2005 SS_{122}	—	September 29, 2005	Anderson Mesa	LONEOS	·	2.6 km	MPC; JPL
619110	2005 SV_{128}	—	March 23, 2003	Kitt Peak	Spacewatch	·	1.5 km	MPC; JPL
619111	2005 SX_{143}	—	August 31, 2005	Palomar	NEAT	·	1.1 km	MPC; JPL
619112	2005 SX_{157}	—	September 26, 2005	Kitt Peak	Spacewatch	·	460 m	MPC; JPL
619113	2005 SA_{161}	—	September 27, 2005	Kitt Peak	Spacewatch	·	980 m	MPC; JPL
619114	2005 SA_{169}	—	September 29, 2005	Kitt Peak	Spacewatch	·	510 m	MPC; JPL
619115	2005 SO_{169}	—	March 23, 1995	Kitt Peak	Spacewatch	·	1.8 km	MPC; JPL
619116	2005 SZ_{178}	—	November 7, 2002	Kitt Peak	Deep Ecliptic Survey	·	560 m	MPC; JPL
619117	2005 SO_{196}	—	September 30, 2005	Kitt Peak	Spacewatch	·	530 m	MPC; JPL
619118	2005 SJ_{207}	—	September 30, 2005	Mount Lemmon	Mount Lemmon Survey	·	2.7 km	MPC; JPL
619119	2005 SY_{208}	—	September 30, 2005	Mount Lemmon	Mount Lemmon Survey	·	1.3 km	MPC; JPL
619120	2005 SZ_{210}	—	August 31, 2005	Palomar	NEAT	·	1.7 km	MPC; JPL
619121	2005 ST_{229}	—	September 30, 2005	Mount Lemmon	Mount Lemmon Survey	·	1.2 km	MPC; JPL
619122	2005 SO_{248}	—	September 30, 2005	Mount Lemmon	Mount Lemmon Survey	·	490 m	MPC; JPL
619123	2005 SA_{260}	—	September 26, 2005	Kitt Peak	Spacewatch	·	2.2 km	MPC; JPL
619124	2005 SA_{276}	—	September 29, 2005	Kitt Peak	Spacewatch	·	460 m	MPC; JPL
619125	2005 SY_{276}	—	September 30, 2005	Kitt Peak	Spacewatch	·	430 m	MPC; JPL
619126	2005 SE_{280}	—	September 25, 2005	Catalina	CSS	·	530 m	MPC; JPL
619127	2005 SH_{284}	—	February 25, 2007	Kitt Peak	Spacewatch	EUN	1.1 km	MPC; JPL
619128	2005 SX_{286}	—	October 1, 2005	Apache Point	SDSS Collaboration	·	1.4 km	MPC; JPL
619129	2005 SA_{295}	—	September 30, 2005	Kitt Peak	Spacewatch	·	700 m	MPC; JPL
619130	2005 SX_{295}	—	September 27, 2005	Palomar	NEAT	·	980 m	MPC; JPL
619131	2005 SX_{300}	—	September 23, 2005	Kitt Peak	Spacewatch	VER	2.4 km	MPC; JPL
619132	2005 TA_{1}	—	August 29, 2005	Anderson Mesa	LONEOS	·	680 m	MPC; JPL
619133	2005 TZ_{5}	—	September 3, 2005	Palomar	NEAT	THB	2.8 km	MPC; JPL
619134	2005 TA_{21}	—	September 14, 2005	Kitt Peak	Spacewatch	VER	2.2 km	MPC; JPL
619135	2005 TR_{24}	—	October 1, 2005	Mount Lemmon	Mount Lemmon Survey	·	1.3 km	MPC; JPL
619136	2005 TA_{26}	—	October 1, 2005	Mount Lemmon	Mount Lemmon Survey	(2076)	600 m	MPC; JPL
619137 Klausjugelt	2005 TM_{30}	Klausjugelt	October 5, 2005	Radebeul	M. Fiedler	·	860 m	MPC; JPL
619138	2005 TS_{55}	—	October 1, 2005	Socorro	LINEAR	·	1.6 km	MPC; JPL
619139	2005 TH_{67}	—	October 5, 2005	Mount Lemmon	Mount Lemmon Survey	·	1.1 km	MPC; JPL
619140	2005 TA_{76}	—	October 5, 2005	Kitt Peak	Spacewatch	·	1.1 km	MPC; JPL
619141	2005 TO_{85}	—	September 24, 2005	Kitt Peak	Spacewatch	·	480 m	MPC; JPL
619142	2005 TT_{112}	—	October 7, 2005	Kitt Peak	Spacewatch	·	2.3 km	MPC; JPL
619143	2005 TS_{117}	—	September 19, 1998	Apache Point	SDSS Collaboration	·	350 m	MPC; JPL
619144	2005 TV_{118}	—	October 7, 2005	Mount Lemmon	Mount Lemmon Survey	·	2.2 km	MPC; JPL
619145	2005 TL_{122}	—	September 29, 2005	Mount Lemmon	Mount Lemmon Survey	·	1.2 km	MPC; JPL
619146	2005 TS_{129}	—	September 23, 2005	Kitt Peak	Spacewatch	·	1.2 km	MPC; JPL
619147	2005 TR_{133}	—	October 9, 2005	Kitt Peak	Spacewatch	·	3.3 km	MPC; JPL
619148	2005 TK_{139}	—	October 8, 2005	Kitt Peak	Spacewatch	·	2.4 km	MPC; JPL
619149	2005 TW_{158}	—	September 26, 2005	Kitt Peak	Spacewatch	·	510 m	MPC; JPL
619150	2005 TW_{178}	—	August 30, 2005	Kitt Peak	Spacewatch	·	1.1 km	MPC; JPL
619151	1995 BY_{10}	—	January 29, 1995	Kitt Peak	Spacewatch	KOR	1.3 km	MPC; JPL
619152	1995 GB_{3}	—	April 2, 1995	Kitt Peak	Spacewatch	·	1.1 km	MPC; JPL
619153	1995 RB_{1}	—	September 3, 1995	Kitt Peak	Spacewatch	·	1.5 km	MPC; JPL
619154	1995 SZ_{42}	—	September 25, 1995	Kitt Peak	Spacewatch	·	1.5 km	MPC; JPL
619155	1995 SB_{65}	—	September 19, 1995	Kitt Peak	Spacewatch	·	2.4 km	MPC; JPL
619156	1995 WH_{24}	—	November 18, 1995	Kitt Peak	Spacewatch	·	1.6 km	MPC; JPL
619157	1996 GR_{10}	—	April 13, 1996	Kitt Peak	Spacewatch	·	960 m	MPC; JPL
619158	1996 HH_{27}	—	November 19, 2008	Mount Lemmon	Mount Lemmon Survey	·	1.0 km	MPC; JPL
619159	1996 VW_{28}	—	November 13, 1996	Kitt Peak	Spacewatch	·	590 m	MPC; JPL
619160	1996 VM_{36}	—	November 10, 1996	Kitt Peak	Spacewatch	·	1.2 km	MPC; JPL
619161	1997 JX_{2}	—	May 4, 1997	Mauna Kea	Veillet, C.	·	2.8 km	MPC; JPL
619162	1997 SS_{14}	—	September 28, 1997	Kitt Peak	Spacewatch	·	1.9 km	MPC; JPL
619163	1997 TV_{23}	—	October 10, 1997	Kitt Peak	Spacewatch	·	710 m	MPC; JPL
619164	1998 BN_{22}	—	January 23, 1998	Kitt Peak	Spacewatch	MAS	690 m	MPC; JPL
619165	1998 BH_{31}	—	January 26, 1998	Kitt Peak	Spacewatch	·	2.5 km	MPC; JPL
619166	1998 BX_{39}	—	January 31, 1998	Kitt Peak	Spacewatch	·	1.6 km	MPC; JPL
619167	1998 BK_{48}	—	January 29, 1998	Kitt Peak	Spacewatch	·	2.3 km	MPC; JPL
619168	1998 HQ_{15}	—	April 21, 1998	Kitt Peak	Spacewatch	·	3.3 km	MPC; JPL
619169	1998 SC_{182}	—	September 19, 1998	Apache Point	SDSS Collaboration	·	570 m	MPC; JPL
619170	1998 WE_{39}	—	November 21, 1998	Kitt Peak	Spacewatch	·	790 m	MPC; JPL
619171	1999 BT_{30}	—	January 10, 1999	Kitt Peak	Spacewatch	·	1.0 km	MPC; JPL
619172	1999 FO_{98}	—	November 7, 2007	Kitt Peak	Spacewatch	EOS	1.5 km	MPC; JPL
619173	1999 FR_{98}	—	June 29, 2016	Haleakala	Pan-STARRS 1	·	1.5 km	MPC; JPL
619174	1999 FJ_{99}	—	January 2, 2011	Mount Lemmon	Mount Lemmon Survey	·	1.0 km	MPC; JPL
619175	1999 FY_{99}	—	January 23, 2006	Kitt Peak	Spacewatch	·	760 m	MPC; JPL
619176	1999 LF_{37}	—	October 26, 2011	Haleakala	Pan-STARRS 1	·	950 m	MPC; JPL
619177	1999 RO_{260}	—	September 5, 1999	Kitt Peak	Spacewatch	·	840 m	MPC; JPL
619178	1999 SL_{21}	—	September 30, 1999	Kitt Peak	Spacewatch	·	930 m	MPC; JPL
619179	1999 SJ_{29}	—	June 24, 2014	Haleakala	Pan-STARRS 1	·	950 m	MPC; JPL
619180	1999 TX_{51}	—	October 4, 1999	Kitt Peak	Spacewatch	·	1.3 km	MPC; JPL
619181	1999 TY_{274}	—	October 6, 1999	Socorro	LINEAR	·	2.3 km	MPC; JPL
619182	1999 TC_{339}	—	October 11, 1999	Kitt Peak	Spacewatch	·	1.5 km	MPC; JPL
619183	1999 UC_{55}	—	December 5, 2007	Kitt Peak	Spacewatch	NYS	880 m	MPC; JPL
619184	1999 UN_{65}	—	October 19, 1999	Kitt Peak	Spacewatch	·	2.4 km	MPC; JPL
619185	1999 VB_{16}	—	November 2, 1999	Kitt Peak	Spacewatch	PAD	1.3 km	MPC; JPL
619186	1999 VF_{214}	—	November 1, 1999	Kitt Peak	Spacewatch	·	490 m	MPC; JPL
619187	1999 VA_{233}	—	May 4, 2006	Kitt Peak	Spacewatch	·	1.9 km	MPC; JPL
619188	1999 VL_{233}	—	January 27, 2012	Mount Lemmon	Mount Lemmon Survey	MAS	610 m	MPC; JPL
619189	1999 VO_{233}	—	February 19, 2015	Haleakala	Pan-STARRS 1	·	1.5 km	MPC; JPL
619190	1999 WZ_{27}	—	November 19, 2003	Kitt Peak	Spacewatch	·	930 m	MPC; JPL
619191	1999 WV_{28}	—	October 8, 2008	Kitt Peak	Spacewatch	·	1.5 km	MPC; JPL
619192	1999 XW_{266}	—	December 28, 2011	Kitt Peak	Spacewatch	·	1.9 km	MPC; JPL
619193	1999 YA_{2}	—	December 16, 1999	Kitt Peak	Spacewatch	·	3.4 km	MPC; JPL
619194	1999 YV_{19}	—	December 29, 1999	Mauna Kea	Veillet, C.	·	2.1 km	MPC; JPL
619195	1999 YF_{30}	—	December 1, 2014	Haleakala	Pan-STARRS 1	H	520 m	MPC; JPL
619196	2000 AU_{49}	—	January 5, 2000	Socorro	LINEAR	·	1.4 km	MPC; JPL
619197	2000 AK_{223}	—	January 9, 2000	Kitt Peak	Spacewatch	·	2.0 km	MPC; JPL
619198	2000 AS_{259}	—	October 28, 2008	Kitt Peak	Spacewatch	AGN	870 m	MPC; JPL
619199	2000 CQ_{79}	—	February 8, 2000	Kitt Peak	Spacewatch	·	620 m	MPC; JPL
619200	2000 CX_{151}	—	February 19, 2015	Haleakala	Pan-STARRS 1	BRA	1.2 km	MPC; JPL

== 619201–619300 ==
back to top

Designation			Discovery			Properties		Ref
Permanent	Provisional	Named after	Date	Site	Discoverer(s)	Category	Diam.	Ref
619201	2000 EH_{197}	—	March 4, 2000	Socorro	LINEAR	·	3.1 km	MPC; JPL
619202	2000 FQ_{54}	—	March 30, 2000	Kitt Peak	Spacewatch	·	960 m	MPC; JPL
619203	2000 GS_{188}	—	February 16, 2012	Haleakala	Pan-STARRS 1	·	770 m	MPC; JPL
619204	2000 JR_{80}	—	May 1, 2000	Kitt Peak	Spacewatch	·	900 m	MPC; JPL
619205	2000 JL_{95}	—	September 24, 2014	Haleakala	Pan-STARRS 1	H	470 m	MPC; JPL
619206	2000 NG_{1}	—	July 3, 2000	Kitt Peak	Spacewatch	EUN	1.0 km	MPC; JPL
619207	2000 OG_{71}	—	August 27, 2011	Haleakala	Pan-STARRS 1	NYS	760 m	MPC; JPL
619208	2000 QL_{19}	—	August 24, 2000	Socorro	LINEAR	·	1.6 km	MPC; JPL
619209	2000 QQ_{109}	—	August 31, 2000	Kitt Peak	Spacewatch	·	2.6 km	MPC; JPL
619210	2000 QT_{260}	—	January 26, 2007	Kitt Peak	Spacewatch	·	1.1 km	MPC; JPL
619211	2000 QW_{260}	—	January 1, 2009	Mount Lemmon	Mount Lemmon Survey	·	790 m	MPC; JPL
619212	2000 RX_{109}	—	August 14, 2013	Haleakala	Pan-STARRS 1	·	1.3 km	MPC; JPL
619213	2000 SM_{377}	—	February 27, 2008	Mount Lemmon	Mount Lemmon Survey	·	2.3 km	MPC; JPL
619214	2000 SG_{385}	—	September 23, 2011	Haleakala	Pan-STARRS 1	·	830 m	MPC; JPL
619215	2000 TW_{75}	—	December 14, 2006	Kitt Peak	Spacewatch	URS	2.8 km	MPC; JPL
619216	2000 TW_{76}	—	November 20, 2006	Kitt Peak	Spacewatch	VER	2.0 km	MPC; JPL
619217	2000 TC_{78}	—	January 8, 2016	Haleakala	Pan-STARRS 1	ADE	1.7 km	MPC; JPL
619218	2000 TQ_{81}	—	February 17, 2013	Kitt Peak	Spacewatch	·	1.1 km	MPC; JPL
619219	2000 TW_{81}	—	September 23, 2011	Mount Lemmon	Mount Lemmon Survey	·	2.0 km	MPC; JPL
619220	2000 VU_{65}	—	February 3, 2009	Mount Lemmon	Mount Lemmon Survey	·	920 m	MPC; JPL
619221	2000 WE_{20}	—	November 24, 2000	Kitt Peak	Spacewatch	·	1.5 km	MPC; JPL
619222	2000 WZ_{201}	—	November 21, 2009	Kitt Peak	Spacewatch	·	1.6 km	MPC; JPL
619223	2000 YV_{144}	—	September 19, 2003	Kitt Peak	Spacewatch	·	1.1 km	MPC; JPL
619224	2000 YQ_{145}	—	May 24, 2014	Haleakala	Pan-STARRS 1	H	400 m	MPC; JPL
619225	2001 BU_{83}	—	October 12, 2007	Kitt Peak	Spacewatch	MAS	730 m	MPC; JPL
619226	2001 BF_{84}	—	March 8, 2005	Mount Lemmon	Mount Lemmon Survey	MAS	660 m	MPC; JPL
619227	2001 DO_{114}	—	November 10, 2005	Catalina	CSS	·	2.6 km	MPC; JPL
619228	2001 DE_{118}	—	September 13, 2013	Mount Lemmon	Mount Lemmon Survey	GEF	920 m	MPC; JPL
619229	2001 FT_{200}	—	October 26, 2009	Kitt Peak	Spacewatch	·	510 m	MPC; JPL
619230	2001 FO_{205}	—	March 21, 2001	Kitt Peak	Spacewatch	·	530 m	MPC; JPL
619231	2001 FS_{210}	—	December 4, 2005	Mount Lemmon	Mount Lemmon Survey	THM	1.8 km	MPC; JPL
619232	2001 FX_{240}	—	September 30, 1999	Kitt Peak	Spacewatch	·	1.0 km	MPC; JPL
619233	2001 KD_{80}	—	November 4, 2007	Kitt Peak	Spacewatch	·	1.4 km	MPC; JPL
619234	2001 MA_{5}	—	June 22, 2001	Palomar	NEAT	·	1.9 km	MPC; JPL
619235	2001 OO_{114}	—	July 26, 2001	Kitt Peak	Spacewatch	EOS	1.3 km	MPC; JPL
619236	2001 QL_{107}	—	August 23, 2001	Socorro	LINEAR	H	620 m	MPC; JPL
619237	2001 QS_{182}	—	August 17, 2001	Palomar	NEAT	·	1.3 km	MPC; JPL
619238	2001 SU_{358}	—	March 23, 2012	Mount Lemmon	Mount Lemmon Survey	·	1 km	MPC; JPL
619239	2001 SH_{362}	—	April 14, 2008	Mount Lemmon	Mount Lemmon Survey	·	1.3 km	MPC; JPL
619240	2001 SU_{363}	—	November 22, 2014	Haleakala	Pan-STARRS 1	KON	2.4 km	MPC; JPL
619241	2001 TD_{162}	—	October 11, 2001	Kitt Peak	Spacewatch	·	1.1 km	MPC; JPL
619242	2001 TM_{256}	—	October 15, 2001	Palomar	NEAT	RAF	720 m	MPC; JPL
619243	2001 TM_{264}	—	January 16, 2009	Kitt Peak	Spacewatch	·	2.0 km	MPC; JPL
619244	2001 UW_{138}	—	October 18, 2001	Palomar	NEAT	·	1.3 km	MPC; JPL
619245	2001 UL_{195}	—	October 17, 2001	Kitt Peak	Spacewatch	·	700 m	MPC; JPL
619246	2001 UO_{230}	—	October 25, 2001	Apache Point	SDSS Collaboration	·	1.9 km	MPC; JPL
619247	2001 UU_{233}	—	January 30, 2011	Kitt Peak	Spacewatch	(5)	830 m	MPC; JPL
619248	2001 UF_{234}	—	October 19, 2001	Palomar	NEAT	·	1.2 km	MPC; JPL
619249	2001 UY_{234}	—	October 25, 2001	Apache Point	SDSS Collaboration	·	830 m	MPC; JPL
619250	2001 UR_{236}	—	October 25, 2001	Apache Point	SDSS Collaboration	·	1.3 km	MPC; JPL
619251	2001 UL_{237}	—	July 5, 2016	Haleakala	Pan-STARRS 1	·	2.0 km	MPC; JPL
619252	2001 UZ_{239}	—	February 26, 2014	Haleakala	Pan-STARRS 1	·	1.9 km	MPC; JPL
619253	2001 UD_{240}	—	October 20, 2008	Mount Lemmon	Mount Lemmon Survey	·	560 m	MPC; JPL
619254	2001 UO_{240}	—	April 12, 2016	Haleakala	Pan-STARRS 1	·	1.1 km	MPC; JPL
619255	2001 VL_{124}	—	November 9, 2001	Socorro	LINEAR	·	590 m	MPC; JPL
619256	2001 VS_{134}	—	November 21, 2014	Haleakala	Pan-STARRS 1	·	1.4 km	MPC; JPL
619257	2001 VT_{134}	—	December 17, 2007	Mount Lemmon	Mount Lemmon Survey	·	1.7 km	MPC; JPL
619258	2001 VV_{138}	—	November 12, 2001	Apache Point	SDSS Collaboration	EOS	1.4 km	MPC; JPL
619259	2001 WF_{1}	—	November 17, 2001	Socorro	LINEAR	·	1.1 km	MPC; JPL
619260	2001 WH_{54}	—	November 19, 2001	Socorro	LINEAR	V	540 m	MPC; JPL
619261	2001 WH_{106}	—	December 18, 2007	Mount Lemmon	Mount Lemmon Survey	·	1.9 km	MPC; JPL
619262	2001 XM_{155}	—	December 14, 2001	Socorro	LINEAR	(1547)	1.4 km	MPC; JPL
619263	2001 XR_{168}	—	December 14, 2001	Socorro	LINEAR	NYS	660 m	MPC; JPL
619264	2001 XQ_{269}	—	October 27, 2005	Kitt Peak	Spacewatch	·	1.2 km	MPC; JPL
619265	2001 YR_{1}	—	December 18, 2001	Socorro	LINEAR	H	390 m	MPC; JPL
619266	2001 YP_{10}	—	December 17, 2001	Socorro	LINEAR	·	2.4 km	MPC; JPL
619267	2001 YY_{14}	—	December 17, 2001	Socorro	LINEAR	·	1.5 km	MPC; JPL
619268	2001 YY_{26}	—	December 18, 2001	Socorro	LINEAR	·	1.2 km	MPC; JPL
619269	2001 YA_{163}	—	September 2, 2011	Haleakala	Pan-STARRS 1	V	560 m	MPC; JPL
619270	2001 YT_{163}	—	January 13, 2002	Palomar	NEAT	·	670 m	MPC; JPL
619271	2001 YU_{163}	—	December 18, 2009	Mount Lemmon	Mount Lemmon Survey	H	340 m	MPC; JPL
619272	2001 YC_{164}	—	December 9, 2012	Mount Lemmon	Mount Lemmon Survey	·	680 m	MPC; JPL
619273	2002 AQ_{17}	—	January 5, 2002	Palomar	NEAT	H	600 m	MPC; JPL
619274	2002 AN_{114}	—	January 9, 2002	Socorro	LINEAR	·	810 m	MPC; JPL
619275	2002 AP_{174}	—	January 14, 2002	Socorro	LINEAR	·	2.4 km	MPC; JPL
619276	2002 AC_{212}	—	November 18, 2015	Haleakala	Pan-STARRS 1	·	960 m	MPC; JPL
619277	2002 AT_{213}	—	November 20, 2008	Kitt Peak	Spacewatch	·	900 m	MPC; JPL
619278	2002 AS_{216}	—	November 20, 2006	Mount Lemmon	Mount Lemmon Survey	·	2.3 km	MPC; JPL
619279	2002 BG_{18}	—	January 14, 2002	Socorro	LINEAR	·	1.1 km	MPC; JPL
619280	2002 BO_{20}	—	January 14, 2002	Palomar	NEAT	H	420 m	MPC; JPL
619281	2002 BU_{33}	—	June 4, 2011	Mount Lemmon	Mount Lemmon Survey	·	1.0 km	MPC; JPL
619282	2002 CQ_{6}	—	February 6, 2002	Socorro	LINEAR	PHO	960 m	MPC; JPL
619283	2002 CE_{37}	—	February 7, 2002	Socorro	LINEAR	·	1.5 km	MPC; JPL
619284	2002 CN_{76}	—	January 14, 2002	Kitt Peak	Spacewatch	·	1.2 km	MPC; JPL
619285	2002 CH_{150}	—	February 10, 2002	Socorro	LINEAR	·	900 m	MPC; JPL
619286	2002 CZ_{197}	—	February 8, 2002	Kitt Peak	Spacewatch	MAS	650 m	MPC; JPL
619287	2002 CE_{235}	—	February 12, 2002	Kitt Peak	Spacewatch	THM	1.7 km	MPC; JPL
619288	2002 CO_{257}	—	February 8, 2002	Kitt Peak	Spacewatch	NYS	940 m	MPC; JPL
619289	2002 CG_{264}	—	January 22, 2002	Kitt Peak	Spacewatch	V	560 m	MPC; JPL
619290	2002 CE_{265}	—	February 6, 2002	Kitt Peak	Spacewatch	·	660 m	MPC; JPL
619291	2002 CA_{267}	—	February 7, 2002	Kitt Peak	Spacewatch	V	510 m	MPC; JPL
619292	2002 CW_{276}	—	February 7, 2002	Palomar	NEAT	·	940 m	MPC; JPL
619293	2002 CG_{296}	—	February 10, 2002	Socorro	LINEAR	·	1.9 km	MPC; JPL
619294	2002 CW_{320}	—	February 13, 2002	Apache Point	SDSS Collaboration	·	1.1 km	MPC; JPL
619295	2002 CK_{323}	—	March 8, 2014	Mount Lemmon	Mount Lemmon Survey	·	2.3 km	MPC; JPL
619296	2002 CF_{328}	—	February 8, 2002	Kitt Peak	Spacewatch	·	1.0 km	MPC; JPL
619297	2002 DL_{21}	—	March 4, 2011	Mount Lemmon	Mount Lemmon Survey	·	1.5 km	MPC; JPL
619298	2002 EP_{10}	—	March 5, 2002	Anderson Mesa	LONEOS	·	1.7 km	MPC; JPL
619299	2002 EC_{156}	—	March 11, 2002	Cima Ekar	ADAS	·	790 m	MPC; JPL
619300	2002 EZ_{164}	—	November 24, 2008	Kitt Peak	Spacewatch	NYS	1.1 km	MPC; JPL

== 619301–619400 ==
back to top

Designation			Discovery			Properties		Ref
Permanent	Provisional	Named after	Date	Site	Discoverer(s)	Category	Diam.	Ref
619301	2002 EF_{168}	—	January 19, 2013	Mount Lemmon	Mount Lemmon Survey	·	2.9 km	MPC; JPL
619302	2002 EZ_{169}	—	March 10, 2002	Kitt Peak	Spacewatch	·	2.0 km	MPC; JPL
619303	2002 EC_{172}	—	March 6, 2011	Mount Lemmon	Mount Lemmon Survey	·	1.4 km	MPC; JPL
619304	2002 EL_{172}	—	January 1, 2009	Kitt Peak	Spacewatch	·	720 m	MPC; JPL
619305	2002 FD_{7}	—	March 19, 2002	Palomar	NEAT	PHO	880 m	MPC; JPL
619306	2002 FC_{43}	—	October 5, 2005	Mount Lemmon	Mount Lemmon Survey	·	2.3 km	MPC; JPL
619307	2002 GX	—	April 3, 2002	Palomar	NEAT	T_{j} (2.96)	3.0 km	MPC; JPL
619308	2002 GN_{186}	—	September 26, 2011	Haleakala	Pan-STARRS 1	H	450 m	MPC; JPL
619309	2002 GM_{189}	—	April 1, 2002	Palomar	NEAT	·	2.1 km	MPC; JPL
619310	2002 GO_{192}	—	September 23, 2011	Haleakala	Pan-STARRS 1	THB	2.3 km	MPC; JPL
619311	2002 GS_{194}	—	September 25, 2013	Mount Lemmon	Mount Lemmon Survey	·	1.5 km	MPC; JPL
619312	2002 GG_{196}	—	January 19, 2016	Haleakala	Pan-STARRS 1	·	690 m	MPC; JPL
619313	2002 GB_{197}	—	September 18, 2003	Kitt Peak	Spacewatch	MAS	730 m	MPC; JPL
619314	2002 HJ_{19}	—	April 19, 2002	Kitt Peak	Spacewatch	PHO	730 m	MPC; JPL
619315	2002 KW_{11}	—	May 17, 2002	Palomar	NEAT	·	1.2 km	MPC; JPL
619316	2002 NJ_{79}	—	March 21, 2009	Catalina	CSS	·	1.0 km	MPC; JPL
619317	2002 NE_{84}	—	September 1, 2010	Mount Lemmon	Mount Lemmon Survey	·	750 m	MPC; JPL
619318	2002 OZ_{35}	—	September 2, 2010	Mount Lemmon	Mount Lemmon Survey	·	1.2 km	MPC; JPL
619319	2002 OE_{37}	—	September 4, 2007	Mount Lemmon	Mount Lemmon Survey	·	1.8 km	MPC; JPL
619320	2002 PK_{189}	—	August 7, 2002	Palomar	NEAT	·	500 m	MPC; JPL
619321	2002 QM_{58}	—	August 13, 2002	Palomar	NEAT	·	1.1 km	MPC; JPL
619322	2002 QW_{95}	—	August 18, 2002	Palomar	NEAT	·	450 m	MPC; JPL
619323	2002 RH_{74}	—	August 29, 2002	Palomar	NEAT	·	680 m	MPC; JPL
619324	2002 RV_{152}	—	September 12, 2002	Palomar	NEAT	PHO	890 m	MPC; JPL
619325	2002 RN_{257}	—	September 3, 2002	Palomar	NEAT	·	1.4 km	MPC; JPL
619326	2002 RM_{295}	—	August 6, 2010	La Sagra	OAM	MAR	1.3 km	MPC; JPL
619327	2002 RZ_{299}	—	October 5, 2012	Mount Lemmon	Mount Lemmon Survey	KOR	1.1 km	MPC; JPL
619328	2002 SV_{67}	—	October 5, 2002	Apache Point	SDSS	KOR	1.3 km	MPC; JPL
619329	2002 TO_{7}	—	October 1, 2002	Anderson Mesa	LONEOS	·	1.1 km	MPC; JPL
619330	2002 TH_{127}	—	October 4, 2002	Palomar	NEAT	·	580 m	MPC; JPL
619331	2002 TO_{179}	—	October 13, 2002	Palomar	NEAT	·	510 m	MPC; JPL
619332	2002 TX_{213}	—	October 3, 2002	Socorro	LINEAR	·	530 m	MPC; JPL
619333	2002 TF_{383}	—	October 5, 2002	Apache Point	SDSS Collaboration	·	630 m	MPC; JPL
619334	2002 TY_{390}	—	October 14, 2012	Catalina	CSS	·	650 m	MPC; JPL
619335	2002 UG_{79}	—	October 30, 2002	Palomar	NEAT	·	1.3 km	MPC; JPL
619336	2002 VQ_{66}	—	November 6, 2002	Socorro	LINEAR	·	810 m	MPC; JPL
619337	2002 VP_{149}	—	October 19, 2006	Catalina	CSS	·	1.0 km	MPC; JPL
619338	2002 XH_{121}	—	October 23, 2006	Mount Lemmon	Mount Lemmon Survey	·	900 m	MPC; JPL
619339	2002 YD_{37}	—	November 2, 2010	Mount Lemmon	Mount Lemmon Survey	·	930 m	MPC; JPL
619340	2003 BW_{43}	—	January 27, 2003	Socorro	LINEAR	·	1.2 km	MPC; JPL
619341	2003 BE_{87}	—	January 26, 2003	Kitt Peak	Spacewatch	·	670 m	MPC; JPL
619342	2003 BW_{94}	—	February 4, 2003	Anderson Mesa	LONEOS	·	2.7 km	MPC; JPL
619343	2003 BQ_{95}	—	April 13, 2008	Mount Lemmon	Mount Lemmon Survey	·	1.2 km	MPC; JPL
619344	2003 BW_{95}	—	March 25, 2015	Haleakala	Pan-STARRS 1	·	2.6 km	MPC; JPL
619345	2003 BS_{96}	—	July 14, 2013	Haleakala	Pan-STARRS 1	KON	2.3 km	MPC; JPL
619346	2003 BY_{97}	—	September 23, 2008	Kitt Peak	Spacewatch	·	650 m	MPC; JPL
619347	2003 BP_{100}	—	April 11, 2014	Haleakala	Pan-STARRS 1	PHO	710 m	MPC; JPL
619348	2003 BP_{101}	—	January 18, 2008	Mount Lemmon	Mount Lemmon Survey	·	1.5 km	MPC; JPL
619349	2003 BH_{102}	—	February 28, 2009	Kitt Peak	Spacewatch	·	1.5 km	MPC; JPL
619350	2003 CW	—	January 27, 2003	Socorro	LINEAR	·	1.2 km	MPC; JPL
619351	2003 CP_{25}	—	February 4, 2003	Haleakala	NEAT	·	2.2 km	MPC; JPL
619352	2003 CR_{27}	—	December 1, 2014	Haleakala	Pan-STARRS 1	·	1.0 km	MPC; JPL
619353	2003 DJ_{2}	—	February 22, 2003	Kitt Peak	Spacewatch	·	1.5 km	MPC; JPL
619354	2003 DO_{25}	—	February 10, 2003	Kitt Peak	Spacewatch	·	1.4 km	MPC; JPL
619355	2003 EV_{54}	—	March 7, 2003	Kitt Peak	Deep Lens Survey	·	1.1 km	MPC; JPL
619356 Lippmann	2003 FT_{6}	Lippmann	March 28, 2003	La Silla	G. Masi, Michelsen, R.	EOS	1.7 km	MPC; JPL
619357	2003 FP_{76}	—	March 27, 2003	Palomar	NEAT	·	810 m	MPC; JPL
619358	2003 FM_{134}	—	March 31, 2003	Kitt Peak	Spacewatch	·	3.4 km	MPC; JPL
619359	2003 FD_{135}	—	March 23, 2003	Kitt Peak	Spacewatch	·	690 m	MPC; JPL
619360	2003 FK_{135}	—	March 27, 2003	Kitt Peak	Spacewatch	·	1.3 km	MPC; JPL
619361	2003 FR_{136}	—	February 28, 2008	Catalina	CSS	H	460 m	MPC; JPL
619362	2003 FS_{137}	—	November 27, 2010	Mount Lemmon	Mount Lemmon Survey	(5)	990 m	MPC; JPL
619363	2003 FH_{138}	—	September 21, 2011	Mount Lemmon	Mount Lemmon Survey	·	1.8 km	MPC; JPL
619364	2003 FG_{139}	—	March 31, 2003	Apache Point	SDSS Collaboration	HNS	820 m	MPC; JPL
619365	2003 FU_{140}	—	October 9, 2008	Mount Lemmon	Mount Lemmon Survey	·	540 m	MPC; JPL
619366	2003 GT_{24}	—	April 7, 2003	Kitt Peak	Spacewatch	EUP	2.4 km	MPC; JPL
619367	2003 GK_{30}	—	April 8, 2003	Kitt Peak	Spacewatch	·	970 m	MPC; JPL
619368	2003 GM_{58}	—	March 19, 1996	Kitt Peak	Spacewatch	·	680 m	MPC; JPL
619369	2003 GT_{58}	—	November 13, 2012	Kitt Peak	Spacewatch	TIR	2.4 km	MPC; JPL
619370	2003 GP_{59}	—	August 3, 2016	Haleakala	Pan-STARRS 1	EOS	1.5 km	MPC; JPL
619371	2003 GV_{60}	—	June 4, 2014	Haleakala	Pan-STARRS 1	·	750 m	MPC; JPL
619372	2003 GN_{62}	—	November 16, 2006	Mount Lemmon	Mount Lemmon Survey	·	2.2 km	MPC; JPL
619373	2003 HM_{36}	—	March 27, 2003	Kitt Peak	Spacewatch	·	1.4 km	MPC; JPL
619374	2003 HN_{59}	—	January 11, 2011	Kitt Peak	Spacewatch	·	1.1 km	MPC; JPL
619375	2003 HO_{60}	—	April 10, 2014	Haleakala	Pan-STARRS 1	·	2.9 km	MPC; JPL
619376	2003 HZ_{60}	—	March 20, 2010	Kitt Peak	Spacewatch	·	560 m	MPC; JPL
619377	2003 HO_{61}	—	September 30, 2006	Mount Lemmon	Mount Lemmon Survey	·	1.8 km	MPC; JPL
619378	2003 HP_{62}	—	March 24, 2014	Haleakala	Pan-STARRS 1	·	2.1 km	MPC; JPL
619379	2003 HQ_{62}	—	April 26, 2003	Kitt Peak	Spacewatch	·	1.2 km	MPC; JPL
619380	2003 HP_{63}	—	August 2, 2016	Haleakala	Pan-STARRS 1	·	2.3 km	MPC; JPL
619381	2003 HN_{64}	—	July 5, 2016	Haleakala	Pan-STARRS 1	·	3.7 km	MPC; JPL
619382	2003 JH	—	May 1, 2003	Kitt Peak	Spacewatch	V	440 m	MPC; JPL
619383	2003 JG_{20}	—	May 6, 2003	Kitt Peak	Spacewatch	·	2.6 km	MPC; JPL
619384	2003 KU_{6}	—	May 25, 2003	Kitt Peak	Spacewatch	NYS	810 m	MPC; JPL
619385	2003 KN_{26}	—	May 31, 2003	Cerro Tololo	Deep Ecliptic Survey	·	800 m	MPC; JPL
619386	2003 KU_{31}	—	May 26, 2003	Kitt Peak	Spacewatch	ADE	1.9 km	MPC; JPL
619387	2003 KP_{37}	—	December 23, 2012	Haleakala	Pan-STARRS 1	·	2.1 km	MPC; JPL
619388	2003 KS_{37}	—	September 24, 2011	Haleakala	Pan-STARRS 1	·	1.0 km	MPC; JPL
619389	2003 KY_{38}	—	January 15, 2015	Haleakala	Pan-STARRS 1	HNS	1.1 km	MPC; JPL
619390	2003 LR_{11}	—	June 5, 2003	Kitt Peak	Spacewatch	·	1.2 km	MPC; JPL
619391	2003 QG_{106}	—	August 30, 2003	Haleakala	NEAT	·	1.4 km	MPC; JPL
619392	2003 QJ_{116}	—	August 29, 2003	Mauna Kea	D. D. Balam	·	1.5 km	MPC; JPL
619393	2003 SZ_{6}	—	August 24, 2003	Cerro Tololo	Deep Ecliptic Survey	TIN	890 m	MPC; JPL
619394	2003 SA_{9}	—	September 17, 2003	Kitt Peak	Spacewatch	·	1.4 km	MPC; JPL
619395	2003 SZ_{84}	—	September 20, 2003	Palomar	NEAT	·	480 m	MPC; JPL
619396	2003 SM_{158}	—	September 18, 2003	Palomar	NEAT	(18466)	2.3 km	MPC; JPL
619397	2003 SA_{269}	—	September 18, 2003	Kitt Peak	Spacewatch	·	990 m	MPC; JPL
619398	2003 SG_{331}	—	September 28, 2003	Anderson Mesa	LONEOS	·	2.5 km	MPC; JPL
619399	2003 SU_{363}	—	September 26, 2003	Apache Point	SDSS Collaboration	·	1.8 km	MPC; JPL
619400	2003 SF_{367}	—	September 26, 2003	Apache Point	SDSS Collaboration	AGN	820 m	MPC; JPL

== 619401–619500 ==
back to top

Designation			Discovery			Properties		Ref
Permanent	Provisional	Named after	Date	Site	Discoverer(s)	Category	Diam.	Ref
619401	2003 SA_{372}	—	September 26, 2003	Apache Point	SDSS Collaboration	·	1.6 km	MPC; JPL
619402	2003 SS_{408}	—	April 4, 2002	Kitt Peak	Spacewatch	·	1.7 km	MPC; JPL
619403	2003 SX_{414}	—	February 9, 2005	Kitt Peak	Spacewatch	·	1.8 km	MPC; JPL
619404	2003 SQ_{418}	—	September 28, 2003	Apache Point	SDSS	·	1.2 km	MPC; JPL
619405	2003 SP_{420}	—	September 30, 2003	Kitt Peak	Spacewatch	·	1.1 km	MPC; JPL
619406	2003 SX_{435}	—	September 28, 2003	Anderson Mesa	LONEOS	·	2.1 km	MPC; JPL
619407	2003 SV_{436}	—	November 7, 2008	Mount Lemmon	Mount Lemmon Survey	MRX	950 m	MPC; JPL
619408	2003 SQ_{443}	—	September 16, 2003	Kitt Peak	Spacewatch	·	1.7 km	MPC; JPL
619409	2003 SD_{444}	—	September 19, 2003	Kitt Peak	Spacewatch	·	1.3 km	MPC; JPL
619410	2003 SS_{448}	—	January 15, 2010	Kitt Peak	Spacewatch	H	410 m	MPC; JPL
619411	2003 SE_{453}	—	March 5, 2017	Haleakala	Pan-STARRS 1	·	1.1 km	MPC; JPL
619412	2003 ST_{462}	—	November 15, 2011	Mount Lemmon	Mount Lemmon Survey	MAS	570 m	MPC; JPL
619413	2003 SO_{466}	—	September 27, 2003	Kitt Peak	Spacewatch	MAS	600 m	MPC; JPL
619414	2003 TR_{13}	—	September 22, 2003	Haleakala	NEAT	·	2.1 km	MPC; JPL
619415	2003 TA_{27}	—	October 1, 2003	Kitt Peak	Spacewatch	·	1.1 km	MPC; JPL
619416	2003 TG_{28}	—	October 1, 2003	Kitt Peak	Spacewatch	·	780 m	MPC; JPL
619417	2003 TT_{28}	—	October 1, 2003	Kitt Peak	Spacewatch	·	980 m	MPC; JPL
619418	2003 TM_{61}	—	April 11, 2016	Haleakala	Pan-STARRS 1	·	1.6 km	MPC; JPL
619419	2003 UC_{12}	—	October 19, 2003	Haleakala	NEAT	·	1.3 km	MPC; JPL
619420	2003 UH_{18}	—	October 19, 2003	Kitt Peak	Spacewatch	NYS	1.0 km	MPC; JPL
619421	2003 UE_{33}	—	October 1, 2003	Kitt Peak	Spacewatch	MAS	530 m	MPC; JPL
619422	2003 UZ_{38}	—	September 30, 2003	Kitt Peak	Spacewatch	NYS	860 m	MPC; JPL
619423	2003 UD_{72}	—	September 21, 2003	Kitt Peak	Spacewatch	·	780 m	MPC; JPL
619424	2003 UV_{72}	—	October 19, 2003	Kitt Peak	Spacewatch	·	1.4 km	MPC; JPL
619425	2003 UE_{88}	—	October 19, 2003	Kitt Peak	Spacewatch	·	1.0 km	MPC; JPL
619426	2003 UP_{92}	—	October 20, 2003	Palomar	NEAT	·	1.4 km	MPC; JPL
619427	2003 UH_{142}	—	October 21, 2003	Palomar	NEAT	H	570 m	MPC; JPL
619428	2003 UL_{289}	—	October 24, 2003	Kitt Peak	Spacewatch	·	1.0 km	MPC; JPL
619429	2003 UX_{334}	—	October 18, 2003	Apache Point	SDSS Collaboration	·	1.5 km	MPC; JPL
619430	2003 UY_{421}	—	November 3, 2007	Kitt Peak	Spacewatch	·	1.1 km	MPC; JPL
619431	2003 UG_{432}	—	January 26, 2012	Kitt Peak	Spacewatch	NYS	970 m	MPC; JPL
619432	2003 UX_{438}	—	November 5, 2007	Kitt Peak	Spacewatch	·	820 m	MPC; JPL
619433	2003 UP_{442}	—	September 12, 2014	Haleakala	Pan-STARRS 1	NYS	890 m	MPC; JPL
619434	2003 UG_{445}	—	September 20, 2003	Kitt Peak	Spacewatch	PHO	550 m	MPC; JPL
619435	2003 WW_{6}	—	November 18, 2003	Palomar	NEAT	H	410 m	MPC; JPL
619436	2003 WZ_{7}	—	November 19, 2003	Palomar	NEAT	·	470 m	MPC; JPL
619437	2003 WM_{12}	—	October 18, 2003	Palomar	NEAT	H	610 m	MPC; JPL
619438	2003 WZ_{44}	—	October 20, 2003	Palomar	NEAT	·	1.3 km	MPC; JPL
619439	2003 WV_{90}	—	November 18, 2003	Kitt Peak	Spacewatch	·	640 m	MPC; JPL
619440	2003 WN_{164}	—	November 30, 2003	Kitt Peak	Spacewatch	KOR	1.2 km	MPC; JPL
619441	2003 WZ_{176}	—	September 17, 2003	Palomar	NEAT	·	930 m	MPC; JPL
619442	2003 WJ_{186}	—	November 22, 2003	Kitt Peak	Deep Ecliptic Survey	KOR	1.0 km	MPC; JPL
619443	2003 WC_{199}	—	November 24, 2003	Kitt Peak	Spacewatch	NYS	880 m	MPC; JPL
619444	2003 WW_{200}	—	February 16, 2015	Haleakala	Pan-STARRS 1	·	1.5 km	MPC; JPL
619445	2003 WZ_{208}	—	July 28, 2014	Haleakala	Pan-STARRS 1	·	770 m	MPC; JPL
619446	2003 WP_{210}	—	September 10, 2007	Kitt Peak	Spacewatch	KOR	1.3 km	MPC; JPL
619447	2003 WJ_{214}	—	September 20, 1995	Kitt Peak	Spacewatch	·	770 m	MPC; JPL
619448	2003 YS_{110}	—	December 19, 2003	Socorro	LINEAR	H	590 m	MPC; JPL
619449	2003 YP_{189}	—	November 15, 2006	Catalina	CSS	·	530 m	MPC; JPL
619450	2004 BZ_{63}	—	January 16, 2004	Kitt Peak	Spacewatch	·	510 m	MPC; JPL
619451	2004 BL_{65}	—	January 22, 2004	Socorro	LINEAR	·	1.6 km	MPC; JPL
619452	2004 BS_{163}	—	January 15, 2004	Kitt Peak	Spacewatch	·	880 m	MPC; JPL
619453	2004 BO_{164}	—	January 1, 2009	Kitt Peak	Spacewatch	·	1.5 km	MPC; JPL
619454	2004 BN_{169}	—	August 20, 2014	Haleakala	Pan-STARRS 1	·	850 m	MPC; JPL
619455	2004 BQ_{169}	—	November 15, 2007	Mount Lemmon	Mount Lemmon Survey	EOS	1.6 km	MPC; JPL
619456	2004 BW_{171}	—	December 29, 2008	Mount Lemmon	Mount Lemmon Survey	·	1.4 km	MPC; JPL
619457	2004 CM_{9}	—	January 28, 2004	Kitt Peak	Spacewatch	·	1.2 km	MPC; JPL
619458	2004 CM_{15}	—	February 11, 2004	Kitt Peak	Spacewatch	·	2.0 km	MPC; JPL
619459	2004 CE_{133}	—	February 12, 2004	Kitt Peak	Spacewatch	·	820 m	MPC; JPL
619460	2004 CK_{133}	—	March 14, 2011	Kitt Peak	Spacewatch	·	660 m	MPC; JPL
619461	2004 DX_{70}	—	February 17, 2004	Kitt Peak	Spacewatch	·	1.1 km	MPC; JPL
619462	2004 DJ_{87}	—	December 8, 2015	Haleakala	Pan-STARRS 1	·	950 m	MPC; JPL
619463	2004 DE_{89}	—	March 19, 2010	Mount Lemmon	Mount Lemmon Survey	·	1.5 km	MPC; JPL
619464	2004 DG_{89}	—	April 4, 2011	Mount Lemmon	Mount Lemmon Survey	·	500 m	MPC; JPL
619465	2004 EQ_{36}	—	March 13, 2004	Palomar	NEAT	·	1.8 km	MPC; JPL
619466	2004 ED_{106}	—	March 15, 2004	Kitt Peak	Spacewatch	·	450 m	MPC; JPL
619467	2004 EC_{118}	—	March 15, 2004	Kitt Peak	Spacewatch	EOS	1.3 km	MPC; JPL
619468	2004 FH_{74}	—	March 17, 2004	Kitt Peak	Spacewatch	·	860 m	MPC; JPL
619469	2004 FX_{112}	—	March 21, 2004	Kitt Peak	Spacewatch	·	1.2 km	MPC; JPL
619470	2004 FZ_{144}	—	March 29, 2004	Kitt Peak	Spacewatch	·	730 m	MPC; JPL
619471	2004 FC_{151}	—	March 16, 2004	Kitt Peak	Spacewatch	·	560 m	MPC; JPL
619472	2004 FN_{168}	—	August 2, 2011	ESA OGS	ESA OGS	·	2.6 km	MPC; JPL
619473	2004 FZ_{168}	—	December 12, 2012	Mount Lemmon	Mount Lemmon Survey	·	1.9 km	MPC; JPL
619474	2004 FH_{173}	—	March 17, 2004	Kitt Peak	Spacewatch	·	480 m	MPC; JPL
619475	2004 FE_{174}	—	February 28, 2014	Haleakala	Pan-STARRS 1	·	2.1 km	MPC; JPL
619476	2004 FT_{175}	—	December 4, 2012	Mount Lemmon	Mount Lemmon Survey	·	1.6 km	MPC; JPL
619477	2004 FG_{176}	—	February 10, 2014	Haleakala	Pan-STARRS 1	·	1.3 km	MPC; JPL
619478	2004 GZ_{30}	—	April 13, 2004	Kitt Peak	Spacewatch	·	2.4 km	MPC; JPL
619479	2004 GT_{68}	—	April 13, 2004	Kitt Peak	Spacewatch	·	2.3 km	MPC; JPL
619480	2004 GS_{89}	—	October 22, 2012	Haleakala	Pan-STARRS 1	·	2.0 km	MPC; JPL
619481	2004 GT_{89}	—	February 13, 2007	Mount Lemmon	Mount Lemmon Survey	·	540 m	MPC; JPL
619482	2004 GF_{90}	—	October 18, 2012	Haleakala	Pan-STARRS 1	·	2.0 km	MPC; JPL
619483	2004 HW_{14}	—	April 16, 2004	Kitt Peak	Spacewatch	·	1.1 km	MPC; JPL
619484	2004 HC_{49}	—	April 12, 2004	Kitt Peak	Spacewatch	·	1.3 km	MPC; JPL
619485	2004 HE_{49}	—	April 22, 2004	Campo Imperatore	CINEOS	·	1.1 km	MPC; JPL
619486	2004 HD_{54}	—	April 24, 2004	Catalina	CSS	·	1.6 km	MPC; JPL
619487	2004 HL_{66}	—	April 20, 2004	Kitt Peak	Spacewatch	·	1.2 km	MPC; JPL
619488	2004 HF_{70}	—	April 24, 2004	Kitt Peak	Spacewatch	·	900 m	MPC; JPL
619489	2004 HL_{81}	—	March 2, 2008	Kitt Peak	Spacewatch	BRG	1.1 km	MPC; JPL
619490	2004 JM_{9}	—	May 13, 2004	Kitt Peak	Spacewatch	·	1.6 km	MPC; JPL
619491	2004 JM_{58}	—	April 1, 2008	Kitt Peak	Spacewatch	·	1.0 km	MPC; JPL
619492	2004 KZ_{14}	—	May 23, 2004	Kitt Peak	Spacewatch	AMO	280 m	MPC; JPL
619493	2004 KU_{20}	—	May 23, 2004	Kitt Peak	Spacewatch	·	1.1 km	MPC; JPL
619494	2004 KR_{21}	—	December 11, 2017	Haleakala	Pan-STARRS 1	EOS	1.3 km	MPC; JPL
619495	2004 LS_{32}	—	April 22, 2017	Mount Lemmon	Mount Lemmon Survey	EUN	860 m	MPC; JPL
619496	2004 ND_{29}	—	July 14, 2004	Socorro	LINEAR	·	1.5 km	MPC; JPL
619497	2004 NN_{34}	—	July 11, 2004	Anderson Mesa	LONEOS	·	1.5 km	MPC; JPL
619498	2004 ON_{1}	—	July 16, 2004	Socorro	LINEAR	·	1.4 km	MPC; JPL
619499	2004 PQ_{41}	—	August 8, 2004	Socorro	LINEAR	JUN	1.0 km	MPC; JPL
619500	2004 PR_{117}	—	August 8, 2004	Palomar	NEAT	·	1.8 km	MPC; JPL

== 619501–619600 ==
back to top

Designation			Discovery			Properties		Ref
Permanent	Provisional	Named after	Date	Site	Discoverer(s)	Category	Diam.	Ref
619501	2004 PF_{118}	—	March 13, 2007	Kitt Peak	Spacewatch	·	820 m	MPC; JPL
619502	2004 PJ_{118}	—	February 21, 2007	Kitt Peak	Spacewatch	·	1.4 km	MPC; JPL
619503	2004 PY_{118}	—	January 10, 2006	Mount Lemmon	Mount Lemmon Survey	·	650 m	MPC; JPL
619504	2004 PN_{121}	—	September 29, 2008	Mount Lemmon	Mount Lemmon Survey	·	710 m	MPC; JPL
619505	2004 QS_{33}	—	September 25, 2017	Haleakala	Pan-STARRS 1	·	1.4 km	MPC; JPL
619506	2004 RG_{1}	—	September 3, 2004	Palomar	NEAT	·	2.0 km	MPC; JPL
619507	2004 RQ_{9}	—	September 6, 2004	Socorro	LINEAR	H	470 m	MPC; JPL
619508	2004 RS_{104}	—	September 8, 2004	Palomar	NEAT	·	740 m	MPC; JPL
619509	2004 RU_{123}	—	September 7, 2004	Palomar	NEAT	·	2.3 km	MPC; JPL
619510	2004 RG_{133}	—	September 7, 2004	Kitt Peak	Spacewatch	·	740 m	MPC; JPL
619511	2004 RT_{146}	—	April 6, 2002	Cerro Tololo	Deep Ecliptic Survey	·	1.5 km	MPC; JPL
619512	2004 RR_{147}	—	September 9, 2004	Socorro	LINEAR	EUN	1.1 km	MPC; JPL
619513	2004 RW_{211}	—	September 11, 2004	Socorro	LINEAR	ADE	1.5 km	MPC; JPL
619514	2004 RO_{237}	—	September 10, 2004	Kitt Peak	Spacewatch	·	1.5 km	MPC; JPL
619515	2004 RY_{297}	—	September 11, 2004	Kitt Peak	Spacewatch	·	1.2 km	MPC; JPL
619516	2004 RN_{324}	—	September 13, 2004	Kitt Peak	Spacewatch	·	720 m	MPC; JPL
619517	2004 RH_{359}	—	September 11, 2004	Kitt Peak	Spacewatch	V	410 m	MPC; JPL
619518	2004 RW_{363}	—	August 3, 2017	Haleakala	Pan-STARRS 1	·	1.4 km	MPC; JPL
619519	2004 SW_{6}	—	September 17, 2004	Kitt Peak	Spacewatch	·	830 m	MPC; JPL
619520	2004 TM_{11}	—	October 5, 2004	Goodricke-Pigott	R. A. Tucker	·	690 m	MPC; JPL
619521	2004 TF_{28}	—	October 4, 2004	Kitt Peak	Spacewatch	·	1.0 km	MPC; JPL
619522	2004 TL_{28}	—	October 4, 2004	Kitt Peak	Spacewatch	NEM	2.2 km	MPC; JPL
619523	2004 TW_{29}	—	October 4, 2004	Kitt Peak	Spacewatch	·	1.6 km	MPC; JPL
619524	2004 TQ_{38}	—	October 4, 2004	Kitt Peak	Spacewatch	·	800 m	MPC; JPL
619525	2004 TG_{40}	—	October 4, 2004	Kitt Peak	Spacewatch	EUN	1.0 km	MPC; JPL
619526	2004 TP_{46}	—	October 4, 2004	Kitt Peak	Spacewatch	·	2.2 km	MPC; JPL
619527	2004 TJ_{74}	—	October 6, 2004	Kitt Peak	Spacewatch	·	1.3 km	MPC; JPL
619528	2004 TF_{92}	—	October 5, 2004	Kitt Peak	Spacewatch	·	690 m	MPC; JPL
619529	2004 TK_{142}	—	September 22, 2004	Kitt Peak	Spacewatch	·	870 m	MPC; JPL
619530	2004 TJ_{198}	—	October 7, 2004	Kitt Peak	Spacewatch	·	790 m	MPC; JPL
619531	2004 TA_{240}	—	October 9, 2004	Kitt Peak	Spacewatch	·	960 m	MPC; JPL
619532	2004 TG_{260}	—	October 9, 2004	Kitt Peak	Spacewatch	NYS	770 m	MPC; JPL
619533	2004 TF_{261}	—	October 9, 2004	Kitt Peak	Spacewatch	·	1.4 km	MPC; JPL
619534	2004 TA_{294}	—	October 10, 2004	Kitt Peak	Spacewatch	·	630 m	MPC; JPL
619535	2004 TD_{318}	—	October 4, 2004	Kitt Peak	Spacewatch	·	1.6 km	MPC; JPL
619536	2004 TU_{348}	—	October 7, 2004	Kitt Peak	Spacewatch	·	740 m	MPC; JPL
619537	2004 TU_{371}	—	October 9, 2004	Anderson Mesa	LONEOS	PHO	730 m	MPC; JPL
619538	2004 TY_{371}	—	October 13, 2004	Kitt Peak	Spacewatch	·	870 m	MPC; JPL
619539	2004 TT_{374}	—	November 1, 2013	Mount Lemmon	Mount Lemmon Survey	·	1.4 km	MPC; JPL
619540	2004 TH_{375}	—	March 19, 2013	Haleakala	Pan-STARRS 1	·	800 m	MPC; JPL
619541	2004 TM_{377}	—	October 11, 2004	Kitt Peak	Deep Ecliptic Survey	·	720 m	MPC; JPL
619542	2004 TT_{377}	—	December 4, 2008	Kitt Peak	Spacewatch	·	590 m	MPC; JPL
619543	2004 TW_{378}	—	February 4, 2006	Kitt Peak	Spacewatch	·	1.3 km	MPC; JPL
619544	2004 TA_{382}	—	September 9, 2015	Haleakala	Pan-STARRS 1	V	470 m	MPC; JPL
619545	2004 TE_{383}	—	April 21, 2012	Mount Lemmon	Mount Lemmon Survey	·	1.3 km	MPC; JPL
619546	2004 VN_{37}	—	October 7, 2004	Kitt Peak	Spacewatch	·	810 m	MPC; JPL
619547	2004 VD_{42}	—	October 10, 2004	Kitt Peak	Deep Ecliptic Survey	·	870 m	MPC; JPL
619548	2004 VO_{99}	—	November 9, 2004	Mauna Kea	Veillet, C.	MAS	650 m	MPC; JPL
619549	2004 VD_{103}	—	October 10, 2004	Kitt Peak	Deep Ecliptic Survey	MAS	740 m	MPC; JPL
619550	2004 VN_{132}	—	March 12, 2016	Haleakala	Pan-STARRS 1	H	350 m	MPC; JPL
619551	2004 VC_{133}	—	November 9, 2013	Haleakala	Pan-STARRS 1	·	1.3 km	MPC; JPL
619552	2004 VW_{134}	—	September 5, 2008	Kitt Peak	Spacewatch	HOF	2.5 km	MPC; JPL
619553	2004 VW_{135}	—	December 19, 2009	Mount Lemmon	Mount Lemmon Survey	AEO	840 m	MPC; JPL
619554	2004 VE_{137}	—	August 16, 2009	Catalina	CSS	·	2.2 km	MPC; JPL
619555	2004 VV_{137}	—	March 28, 2015	Haleakala	Pan-STARRS 1	GAL	1.1 km	MPC; JPL
619556	2004 XL_{163}	—	December 15, 2004	Kitt Peak	Spacewatch	·	750 m	MPC; JPL
619557	2004 XQ_{177}	—	November 20, 2004	Kitt Peak	Spacewatch	·	2.1 km	MPC; JPL
619558	2004 XZ_{184}	—	October 15, 2004	Mount Lemmon	Mount Lemmon Survey	·	930 m	MPC; JPL
619559	2004 XM_{193}	—	December 12, 2004	Kitt Peak	Spacewatch	NYS	840 m	MPC; JPL
619560	2004 XE_{195}	—	November 10, 2013	Kitt Peak	Spacewatch	·	1.6 km	MPC; JPL
619561	2004 XN_{195}	—	September 24, 2011	Kitt Peak	Spacewatch	NYS	580 m	MPC; JPL
619562	2004 XF_{196}	—	December 15, 2004	Kitt Peak	Spacewatch	·	680 m	MPC; JPL
619563	2004 XW_{197}	—	December 2, 2004	Kitt Peak	Spacewatch	·	1.2 km	MPC; JPL
619564	2004 XY_{197}	—	January 3, 2016	Haleakala	Pan-STARRS 1	·	880 m	MPC; JPL
619565	2004 YP_{38}	—	September 25, 2016	Haleakala	Pan-STARRS 1	·	3.2 km	MPC; JPL
619566	2004 YY_{40}	—	September 7, 2011	Kitt Peak	Spacewatch	MAS	530 m	MPC; JPL
619567	2005 AG_{85}	—	January 13, 2005	Kitt Peak	Spacewatch	·	980 m	MPC; JPL
619568	2005 BS_{7}	—	January 16, 2005	Socorro	LINEAR	MAS	700 m	MPC; JPL
619569	2005 BN_{46}	—	January 16, 2005	Mauna Kea	Veillet, C.	·	800 m	MPC; JPL
619570	2005 BQ_{46}	—	January 16, 2005	Mauna Kea	Veillet, C.	·	1.8 km	MPC; JPL
619571	2005 BR_{51}	—	December 19, 2004	Mount Lemmon	Mount Lemmon Survey	·	930 m	MPC; JPL
619572	2005 BO_{53}	—	December 7, 2013	Haleakala	Pan-STARRS 1	·	1.5 km	MPC; JPL
619573	2005 CY_{82}	—	February 4, 2005	Kitt Peak	Spacewatch	·	1.1 km	MPC; JPL
619574	2005 CZ_{82}	—	February 16, 2015	Haleakala	Pan-STARRS 1	·	1.9 km	MPC; JPL
619575	2005 CV_{87}	—	August 27, 2009	Kitt Peak	Spacewatch	·	510 m	MPC; JPL
619576	2005 CU_{88}	—	February 9, 2005	Kitt Peak	Spacewatch	·	1.4 km	MPC; JPL
619577	2005 EW_{22}	—	March 3, 2005	Catalina	CSS	MAS	800 m	MPC; JPL
619578	2005 EK_{38}	—	March 3, 2005	Kitt Peak	Spacewatch	H	410 m	MPC; JPL
619579	2005 ED_{58}	—	March 4, 2005	Mount Lemmon	Mount Lemmon Survey	MAS	560 m	MPC; JPL
619580	2005 EK_{193}	—	March 11, 2005	Mount Lemmon	Mount Lemmon Survey	·	1.2 km	MPC; JPL
619581	2005 EN_{198}	—	March 11, 2005	Mount Lemmon	Mount Lemmon Survey	·	1.1 km	MPC; JPL
619582	2005 EC_{263}	—	March 13, 2005	Kitt Peak	Spacewatch	H	380 m	MPC; JPL
619583	2005 EL_{274}	—	March 8, 2005	Mount Lemmon	Mount Lemmon Survey	KOR	1.0 km	MPC; JPL
619584	2005 EZ_{276}	—	March 8, 2005	Mount Lemmon	Mount Lemmon Survey	·	1.2 km	MPC; JPL
619585	2005 EZ_{303}	—	March 11, 2005	Kitt Peak	Deep Ecliptic Survey	·	920 m	MPC; JPL
619586	2005 ES_{310}	—	March 10, 2005	Mount Lemmon	Mount Lemmon Survey	·	900 m	MPC; JPL
619587	2005 EX_{338}	—	October 8, 2007	Kitt Peak	Spacewatch	·	780 m	MPC; JPL
619588	2005 EA_{342}	—	October 3, 1997	Caussols	ODAS	·	790 m	MPC; JPL
619589	2005 EE_{348}	—	March 12, 2005	Kitt Peak	Spacewatch	·	1 km	MPC; JPL
619590	2005 EV_{349}	—	September 29, 2003	Kitt Peak	Spacewatch	·	660 m	MPC; JPL
619591	2005 GX_{42}	—	April 5, 2005	Mount Lemmon	Mount Lemmon Survey	H	480 m	MPC; JPL
619592	2005 GJ_{52}	—	December 27, 2013	Kitt Peak	Spacewatch	·	1.7 km	MPC; JPL
619593	2005 GZ_{74}	—	April 5, 2005	Mount Lemmon	Mount Lemmon Survey	·	1.5 km	MPC; JPL
619594	2005 GK_{97}	—	April 7, 2005	Kitt Peak	Spacewatch	·	1.5 km	MPC; JPL
619595	2005 GA_{157}	—	April 10, 2005	Mount Lemmon	Mount Lemmon Survey	·	940 m	MPC; JPL
619596	2005 GQ_{167}	—	April 11, 2005	Mount Lemmon	Mount Lemmon Survey	·	1.2 km	MPC; JPL
619597	2005 GV_{190}	—	March 8, 2005	Mount Lemmon	Mount Lemmon Survey	MAS	550 m	MPC; JPL
619598	2005 GA_{196}	—	March 10, 2005	Mount Lemmon	Mount Lemmon Survey	·	930 m	MPC; JPL
619599	2005 GE_{228}	—	November 7, 2008	Mount Lemmon	Mount Lemmon Survey	·	1.4 km	MPC; JPL
619600	2005 GF_{231}	—	December 29, 2008	Kitt Peak	Spacewatch	KOR	1.4 km	MPC; JPL

== 619601–619700 ==
back to top

Designation			Discovery			Properties		Ref
Permanent	Provisional	Named after	Date	Site	Discoverer(s)	Category	Diam.	Ref
619601	2005 GP_{238}	—	April 18, 2015	Cerro Tololo-DECam	DECam	KOR	950 m	MPC; JPL
619602	2005 GU_{238}	—	April 4, 2005	Mount Lemmon	Mount Lemmon Survey	·	880 m	MPC; JPL
619603	2005 GB_{240}	—	April 15, 2005	Kitt Peak	Spacewatch	·	630 m	MPC; JPL
619604	2005 JB_{52}	—	May 4, 2005	Kitt Peak	Spacewatch	·	1.2 km	MPC; JPL
619605	2005 JB_{85}	—	May 8, 2005	Mount Lemmon	Mount Lemmon Survey	H	460 m	MPC; JPL
619606	2005 JR_{113}	—	May 10, 2005	Kitt Peak	Spacewatch	·	1.6 km	MPC; JPL
619607	2005 JC_{170}	—	April 16, 2005	Kitt Peak	Spacewatch	·	1.7 km	MPC; JPL
619608	2005 JZ_{194}	—	May 13, 2005	Kitt Peak	Spacewatch	·	1.7 km	MPC; JPL
619609	2005 KT_{1}	—	May 16, 2005	Mount Lemmon	Mount Lemmon Survey	·	1.0 km	MPC; JPL
619610	2005 LF_{26}	—	June 8, 2005	Kitt Peak	Spacewatch	·	1.3 km	MPC; JPL
619611	2005 LG_{26}	—	June 8, 2005	Kitt Peak	Spacewatch	·	810 m	MPC; JPL
619612	2005 LW_{35}	—	June 11, 2005	Kitt Peak	Spacewatch	·	900 m	MPC; JPL
619613	2005 LR_{56}	—	May 16, 2013	Haleakala	Pan-STARRS 1	H	410 m	MPC; JPL
619614	2005 LP_{57}	—	June 1, 2005	Kitt Peak	Spacewatch	·	1.5 km	MPC; JPL
619615	2005 MB_{18}	—	June 27, 2005	Kitt Peak	Spacewatch	·	1.0 km	MPC; JPL
619616	2005 MT_{56}	—	June 18, 2005	Mount Lemmon	Mount Lemmon Survey	·	1.3 km	MPC; JPL
619617	2005 NV_{5}	—	July 3, 2005	Mount Lemmon	Mount Lemmon Survey	·	2.1 km	MPC; JPL
619618	2005 NG_{25}	—	July 4, 2005	Kitt Peak	Spacewatch	·	1.1 km	MPC; JPL
619619	2005 NC_{40}	—	June 14, 2005	Mount Lemmon	Mount Lemmon Survey	·	990 m	MPC; JPL
619620	2005 NO_{44}	—	July 6, 2005	Kitt Peak	Spacewatch	·	1.0 km	MPC; JPL
619621	2005 NA_{71}	—	July 5, 2005	Kitt Peak	Spacewatch	·	2.5 km	MPC; JPL
619622	2005 NO_{85}	—	July 3, 2005	Palomar	NEAT	·	3.8 km	MPC; JPL
619623	2005 NB_{128}	—	July 3, 2005	Palomar	NEAT	·	1.6 km	MPC; JPL
619624	2005 NY_{129}	—	December 2, 2010	Mount Lemmon	Mount Lemmon Survey	·	1.1 km	MPC; JPL
619625	2005 NK_{131}	—	September 26, 2011	Haleakala	Pan-STARRS 1	·	2.1 km	MPC; JPL
619626	2005 OV_{23}	—	July 30, 2005	Palomar	NEAT	·	1.3 km	MPC; JPL
619627	2005 OU_{34}	—	July 30, 2005	Palomar	NEAT	·	1.2 km	MPC; JPL
619628	2005 OD_{35}	—	July 18, 2005	Palomar	NEAT	·	1.3 km	MPC; JPL
619629	2005 PN_{14}	—	August 4, 2005	Palomar	NEAT	·	2.5 km	MPC; JPL
619630	2005 PZ_{22}	—	September 13, 2005	Kitt Peak	Spacewatch	·	550 m	MPC; JPL
619631	2005 PC_{28}	—	August 10, 2005	Mauna Kea	P. A. Wiegert, D. D. Balam	·	2.4 km	MPC; JPL
619632	2005 PF_{28}	—	August 10, 2005	Mauna Kea	P. A. Wiegert, D. D. Balam	·	760 m	MPC; JPL
619633	2005 PR_{29}	—	February 14, 2012	Haleakala	Pan-STARRS 1	EUN	970 m	MPC; JPL
619634	2005 PQ_{31}	—	July 11, 2016	Haleakala	Pan-STARRS 1	VER	2.2 km	MPC; JPL
619635	2005 QR_{32}	—	June 30, 2005	Palomar	NEAT	·	1.6 km	MPC; JPL
619636	2005 QT_{115}	—	August 28, 2005	Kitt Peak	Spacewatch	·	1.0 km	MPC; JPL
619637	2005 QN_{117}	—	August 28, 2005	Kitt Peak	Spacewatch	·	860 m	MPC; JPL
619638	2005 QP_{131}	—	August 28, 2005	Kitt Peak	Spacewatch	VER	2.2 km	MPC; JPL
619639	2005 QM_{133}	—	August 28, 2005	Kitt Peak	Spacewatch	·	510 m	MPC; JPL
619640	2005 QO_{193}	—	February 10, 2008	Mount Lemmon	Mount Lemmon Survey	·	1.1 km	MPC; JPL
619641	2005 QZ_{193}	—	August 28, 2005	Kitt Peak	Spacewatch	·	990 m	MPC; JPL
619642	2005 QK_{195}	—	October 25, 2011	Haleakala	Pan-STARRS 1	HYG	2.6 km	MPC; JPL
619643	2005 QL_{203}	—	August 26, 2005	Palomar	NEAT	·	2.6 km	MPC; JPL
619644	2005 QD_{204}	—	August 31, 2005	Kitt Peak	Spacewatch	·	1.2 km	MPC; JPL
619645	2005 RC_{1}	—	September 1, 2005	Palomar	NEAT	·	1.4 km	MPC; JPL
619646	2005 RR_{18}	—	September 1, 2005	Kitt Peak	Spacewatch	ADE	1.3 km	MPC; JPL
619647	2005 RH_{19}	—	September 1, 2005	Kitt Peak	Spacewatch	·	1.3 km	MPC; JPL
619648	2005 RU_{28}	—	September 12, 2005	Junk Bond	D. Healy	·	1.1 km	MPC; JPL
619649	2005 RU_{41}	—	July 30, 2005	Palomar	NEAT	·	2.2 km	MPC; JPL
619650	2005 RX_{41}	—	August 26, 2005	Palomar	NEAT	·	500 m	MPC; JPL
619651	2005 RK_{53}	—	February 28, 2014	Haleakala	Pan-STARRS 1	·	550 m	MPC; JPL
619652	2005 RB_{54}	—	September 13, 2005	Kitt Peak	Spacewatch	·	2.4 km	MPC; JPL
619653	2005 RL_{54}	—	September 2, 2005	Palomar	NEAT	·	2.4 km	MPC; JPL
619654	2005 RE_{55}	—	October 8, 2012	Mount Lemmon	Mount Lemmon Survey	·	520 m	MPC; JPL
619655	2005 RK_{55}	—	September 1, 2005	Palomar	NEAT	·	600 m	MPC; JPL
619656	2005 SX_{22}	—	September 23, 2005	Kitt Peak	Spacewatch	·	2.6 km	MPC; JPL
619657	2005 SV_{56}	—	September 13, 2005	Kitt Peak	Spacewatch	·	1.2 km	MPC; JPL
619658	2005 SU_{76}	—	September 24, 2005	Kitt Peak	Spacewatch	H	380 m	MPC; JPL
619659	2005 SH_{82}	—	September 24, 2005	Kitt Peak	Spacewatch	HNS	920 m	MPC; JPL
619660	2005 SX_{91}	—	September 24, 2005	Kitt Peak	Spacewatch	·	470 m	MPC; JPL
619661	2005 SW_{140}	—	September 25, 2005	Kitt Peak	Spacewatch	·	2.4 km	MPC; JPL
619662	2005 SL_{142}	—	September 25, 2005	Kitt Peak	Spacewatch	·	2.0 km	MPC; JPL
619663	2005 SG_{161}	—	September 27, 2005	Kitt Peak	Spacewatch	·	1.8 km	MPC; JPL
619664	2005 SG_{183}	—	September 29, 2005	Kitt Peak	Spacewatch	·	900 m	MPC; JPL
619665	2005 SQ_{185}	—	September 29, 2005	Mount Lemmon	Mount Lemmon Survey	·	510 m	MPC; JPL
619666	2005 SN_{187}	—	August 30, 2005	Palomar	NEAT	·	620 m	MPC; JPL
619667	2005 SY_{273}	—	September 27, 2005	Kitt Peak	Spacewatch	·	560 m	MPC; JPL
619668	2005 SM_{280}	—	September 26, 2005	Kitt Peak	Spacewatch	·	570 m	MPC; JPL
619669	2005 SB_{282}	—	April 8, 2003	Palomar	NEAT	·	2.6 km	MPC; JPL
619670	2005 SD_{283}	—	September 27, 2005	Apache Point	SDSS Collaboration	·	3.0 km	MPC; JPL
619671	2005 SF_{298}	—	September 30, 2005	Mount Lemmon	Mount Lemmon Survey	·	510 m	MPC; JPL
619672	2005 SR_{300}	—	September 30, 2005	Mount Lemmon	Mount Lemmon Survey	·	1.2 km	MPC; JPL
619673	2005 SY_{300}	—	September 29, 2005	Mount Lemmon	Mount Lemmon Survey	·	2.0 km	MPC; JPL
619674	2005 SX_{302}	—	September 29, 2005	Mount Lemmon	Mount Lemmon Survey	·	920 m	MPC; JPL
619675	2005 SK_{303}	—	September 23, 2005	Kitt Peak	Spacewatch	·	2.3 km	MPC; JPL
619676	2005 TF_{13}	—	October 2, 2005	Mount Lemmon	Mount Lemmon Survey	·	550 m	MPC; JPL
619677	2005 TQ_{67}	—	October 5, 2005	Mount Lemmon	Mount Lemmon Survey	EOS	1.4 km	MPC; JPL
619678	2005 TE_{116}	—	October 7, 2005	Kitt Peak	Spacewatch	·	1.0 km	MPC; JPL
619679	2005 TD_{139}	—	September 29, 2005	Kitt Peak	Spacewatch	·	2.6 km	MPC; JPL
619680	2005 TU_{150}	—	September 29, 2005	Kitt Peak	Spacewatch	·	1.1 km	MPC; JPL
619681	2005 TV_{157}	—	September 29, 2005	Kitt Peak	Spacewatch	·	2.7 km	MPC; JPL
619682	2005 TB_{180}	—	October 1, 2005	Kitt Peak	Spacewatch	·	840 m	MPC; JPL
619683	2005 TM_{185}	—	October 4, 2005	Mount Lemmon	Mount Lemmon Survey	·	630 m	MPC; JPL
619684	2005 TB_{191}	—	October 1, 2005	Kitt Peak	Spacewatch	·	490 m	MPC; JPL
619685	2005 TK_{199}	—	October 1, 2005	Mount Lemmon	Mount Lemmon Survey	HNS	650 m	MPC; JPL
619686	2005 TM_{200}	—	October 3, 2005	Kitt Peak	Spacewatch	·	1.2 km	MPC; JPL
619687	2005 TE_{201}	—	March 5, 2008	Mount Lemmon	Mount Lemmon Survey	EOS	1.5 km	MPC; JPL
619688	2005 TH_{201}	—	January 18, 1996	Kitt Peak	Spacewatch	·	2.0 km	MPC; JPL
619689	2005 TC_{204}	—	October 1, 2005	Kitt Peak	Spacewatch	·	1.0 km	MPC; JPL
619690	2005 TB_{208}	—	October 7, 2005	Kitt Peak	Spacewatch	·	2.5 km	MPC; JPL
619691	2005 TW_{211}	—	October 11, 2005	Kitt Peak	Spacewatch	·	600 m	MPC; JPL
619692	2005 TF_{220}	—	October 6, 2005	Mount Lemmon	Mount Lemmon Survey	VER	2.3 km	MPC; JPL
619693	2005 TD_{222}	—	October 7, 2005	Catalina	CSS	(194)	1.1 km	MPC; JPL
619694	2005 UD_{24}	—	October 23, 2005	Kitt Peak	Spacewatch	·	1.3 km	MPC; JPL
619695	2005 UZ_{61}	—	October 25, 2005	Mount Lemmon	Mount Lemmon Survey	(1547)	1.2 km	MPC; JPL
619696	2005 UL_{65}	—	September 13, 2005	Catalina	CSS	·	3.3 km	MPC; JPL
619697	2005 UR_{94}	—	October 22, 2005	Kitt Peak	Spacewatch	·	530 m	MPC; JPL
619698	2005 UW_{121}	—	September 30, 2005	Mount Lemmon	Mount Lemmon Survey	·	1.0 km	MPC; JPL
619699	2005 UU_{127}	—	October 24, 2005	Kitt Peak	Spacewatch	·	530 m	MPC; JPL
619700	2005 UH_{143}	—	October 25, 2005	Mount Lemmon	Mount Lemmon Survey	HNS	830 m	MPC; JPL

== 619701–619800 ==
back to top

Designation			Discovery			Properties		Ref
Permanent	Provisional	Named after	Date	Site	Discoverer(s)	Category	Diam.	Ref
619701	2005 UD_{146}	—	October 26, 2005	Kitt Peak	Spacewatch	·	450 m	MPC; JPL
619702	2005 UV_{172}	—	April 20, 2004	Kitt Peak	Spacewatch	·	740 m	MPC; JPL
619703	2005 UX_{172}	—	October 24, 2005	Kitt Peak	Spacewatch	·	2.4 km	MPC; JPL
619704	2005 UJ_{173}	—	October 24, 2005	Kitt Peak	Spacewatch	JUN	1.1 km	MPC; JPL
619705	2005 UD_{196}	—	October 24, 2005	Kitt Peak	Spacewatch	·	1.1 km	MPC; JPL
619706	2005 UP_{268}	—	October 10, 2005	Kitt Peak	Spacewatch	·	2.3 km	MPC; JPL
619707	2005 UQ_{317}	—	October 11, 2005	Kitt Peak	Spacewatch	LIX	2.3 km	MPC; JPL
619708	2005 UU_{339}	—	October 27, 2005	Kitt Peak	Spacewatch	VER	1.8 km	MPC; JPL
619709	2005 UT_{346}	—	October 30, 2005	Kitt Peak	Spacewatch	EUP	2.2 km	MPC; JPL
619710	2005 UB_{364}	—	October 27, 2005	Kitt Peak	Spacewatch	·	500 m	MPC; JPL
619711	2005 UA_{365}	—	October 27, 2005	Kitt Peak	Spacewatch	·	1.1 km	MPC; JPL
619712	2005 UN_{376}	—	October 27, 2005	Kitt Peak	Spacewatch	EUN	1.0 km	MPC; JPL
619713	2005 UQ_{378}	—	October 10, 2005	Kitt Peak	Spacewatch	·	1.0 km	MPC; JPL
619714	2005 UH_{395}	—	October 12, 2005	Kitt Peak	Spacewatch	·	1.1 km	MPC; JPL
619715	2005 UN_{397}	—	September 27, 2005	Palomar	NEAT	·	830 m	MPC; JPL
619716	2005 US_{404}	—	October 29, 2005	Mount Lemmon	Mount Lemmon Survey	·	470 m	MPC; JPL
619717	2005 UN_{408}	—	October 31, 2005	Mount Lemmon	Mount Lemmon Survey	·	2.4 km	MPC; JPL
619718	2005 UQ_{408}	—	October 4, 2005	Mount Lemmon	Mount Lemmon Survey	THM	2.1 km	MPC; JPL
619719	2005 UQ_{413}	—	October 25, 2005	Kitt Peak	Spacewatch	·	930 m	MPC; JPL
619720	2005 UU_{413}	—	October 25, 2005	Kitt Peak	Spacewatch	·	2.3 km	MPC; JPL
619721	2005 UP_{424}	—	October 28, 2005	Kitt Peak	Spacewatch	·	440 m	MPC; JPL
619722	2005 UM_{434}	—	October 29, 2005	Mount Lemmon	Mount Lemmon Survey	TIR	2.0 km	MPC; JPL
619723	2005 UT_{462}	—	October 30, 2005	Kitt Peak	Spacewatch	·	1.2 km	MPC; JPL
619724	2005 UZ_{469}	—	October 30, 2005	Kitt Peak	Spacewatch	·	680 m	MPC; JPL
619725	2005 UB_{474}	—	October 1, 2005	Mount Lemmon	Mount Lemmon Survey	·	460 m	MPC; JPL
619726	2005 US_{490}	—	September 25, 2005	Kitt Peak	Spacewatch	·	540 m	MPC; JPL
619727	2005 UA_{503}	—	October 2, 2016	Mount Lemmon	Mount Lemmon Survey	VER	1.8 km	MPC; JPL
619728	2005 UO_{509}	—	January 30, 2011	Mount Lemmon	Mount Lemmon Survey	·	1.0 km	MPC; JPL
619729	2005 UY_{514}	—	October 30, 2005	Apache Point	SDSS Collaboration	·	2.1 km	MPC; JPL
619730	2005 UD_{534}	—	October 25, 2005	Kitt Peak	Spacewatch	·	590 m	MPC; JPL
619731	2005 UU_{536}	—	November 19, 2012	Kitt Peak	Spacewatch	·	580 m	MPC; JPL
619732	2005 UY_{536}	—	February 13, 2013	Haleakala	Pan-STARRS 1	URS	3.1 km	MPC; JPL
619733	2005 UA_{538}	—	October 29, 2005	Kitt Peak	Spacewatch	·	530 m	MPC; JPL
619734	2005 UX_{538}	—	October 22, 2005	Kitt Peak	Spacewatch	·	1.4 km	MPC; JPL
619735	2005 UK_{542}	—	January 20, 2015	Haleakala	Pan-STARRS 1	·	1.3 km	MPC; JPL
619736	2005 UW_{544}	—	October 25, 2005	Kitt Peak	Spacewatch	·	1.1 km	MPC; JPL
619737	2005 UF_{545}	—	March 7, 2017	Mount Lemmon	Mount Lemmon Survey	·	550 m	MPC; JPL
619738	2005 UH_{547}	—	October 26, 2005	Kitt Peak	Spacewatch	·	490 m	MPC; JPL
619739	2005 UN_{548}	—	October 22, 2005	Kitt Peak	Spacewatch	·	930 m	MPC; JPL
619740	2005 UE_{549}	—	October 25, 2005	Mount Lemmon	Mount Lemmon Survey	·	460 m	MPC; JPL
619741	2005 VN_{51}	—	October 25, 2005	Kitt Peak	Spacewatch	BAR	1.0 km	MPC; JPL
619742	2005 VH_{56}	—	November 4, 2005	Catalina	CSS	·	3.4 km	MPC; JPL
619743	2005 VT_{59}	—	October 25, 2005	Kitt Peak	Spacewatch	·	460 m	MPC; JPL
619744	2005 VQ_{66}	—	October 25, 2005	Kitt Peak	Spacewatch	·	610 m	MPC; JPL
619745	2005 VJ_{70}	—	November 5, 2005	Mount Lemmon	Mount Lemmon Survey	·	2.9 km	MPC; JPL
619746	2005 VC_{75}	—	November 2, 2005	Mount Lemmon	Mount Lemmon Survey	·	1.4 km	MPC; JPL
619747	2005 VL_{79}	—	October 24, 2005	Kitt Peak	Spacewatch	·	1.1 km	MPC; JPL
619748	2005 VO_{93}	—	November 6, 2005	Mount Lemmon	Mount Lemmon Survey	·	520 m	MPC; JPL
619749	2005 VX_{100}	—	November 1, 2005	Kitt Peak	Spacewatch	·	1.4 km	MPC; JPL
619750	2005 VS_{109}	—	October 29, 2005	Kitt Peak	Spacewatch	·	550 m	MPC; JPL
619751	2005 VJ_{135}	—	November 12, 2005	Kitt Peak	Spacewatch	H	560 m	MPC; JPL
619752	2005 VJ_{136}	—	November 3, 2005	Kitt Peak	Spacewatch	H	490 m	MPC; JPL
619753	2005 VD_{138}	—	November 1, 2005	Mount Lemmon	Mount Lemmon Survey	·	480 m	MPC; JPL
619754	2005 VL_{138}	—	November 3, 2005	Mount Lemmon	Mount Lemmon Survey	·	1.2 km	MPC; JPL
619755	2005 VG_{140}	—	February 17, 2007	Mount Lemmon	Mount Lemmon Survey	·	1.2 km	MPC; JPL
619756	2005 VR_{140}	—	March 16, 2012	Catalina	CSS	·	1.9 km	MPC; JPL
619757	2005 VM_{144}	—	November 6, 2005	Mount Lemmon	Mount Lemmon Survey	·	2.7 km	MPC; JPL
619758	2005 VJ_{145}	—	April 1, 2016	Haleakala	Pan-STARRS 1	·	1.5 km	MPC; JPL
619759	2005 VN_{145}	—	October 27, 2005	Mount Lemmon	Mount Lemmon Survey	·	2.1 km	MPC; JPL
619760	2005 VO_{146}	—	November 10, 2005	Kitt Peak	Spacewatch	·	2.0 km	MPC; JPL
619761	2005 VG_{151}	—	November 1, 2005	Kitt Peak	Spacewatch	·	1.4 km	MPC; JPL
619762	2005 VK_{155}	—	November 1, 2005	Mount Lemmon	Mount Lemmon Survey	LUT	3.5 km	MPC; JPL
619763	2005 WW_{19}	—	November 6, 2005	Kitt Peak	Spacewatch	·	560 m	MPC; JPL
619764	2005 WH_{46}	—	October 28, 2005	Kitt Peak	Spacewatch	·	1.3 km	MPC; JPL
619765	2005 WX_{50}	—	November 25, 2005	Mount Lemmon	Mount Lemmon Survey	(1547)	1.3 km	MPC; JPL
619766	2005 WX_{74}	—	October 29, 2005	Mount Lemmon	Mount Lemmon Survey	·	860 m	MPC; JPL
619767	2005 WS_{132}	—	November 25, 2005	Mount Lemmon	Mount Lemmon Survey	·	1.0 km	MPC; JPL
619768	2005 WO_{138}	—	November 12, 2005	Kitt Peak	Spacewatch	·	1.4 km	MPC; JPL
619769	2005 WZ_{140}	—	November 26, 2005	Mount Lemmon	Mount Lemmon Survey	·	890 m	MPC; JPL
619770	2005 WL_{171}	—	November 30, 2005	Kitt Peak	Spacewatch	·	1.3 km	MPC; JPL
619771	2005 WO_{172}	—	November 30, 2005	Mount Lemmon	Mount Lemmon Survey	·	550 m	MPC; JPL
619772	2005 WB_{173}	—	November 30, 2005	Kitt Peak	Spacewatch	·	990 m	MPC; JPL
619773	2005 WT_{181}	—	November 3, 2005	Catalina	CSS	·	610 m	MPC; JPL
619774	2005 WM_{183}	—	November 28, 2005	Kitt Peak	Spacewatch	·	860 m	MPC; JPL
619775	2005 WX_{200}	—	November 26, 2005	Kitt Peak	Spacewatch	·	480 m	MPC; JPL
619776	2005 WV_{205}	—	November 30, 2005	Mount Lemmon	Mount Lemmon Survey	·	480 m	MPC; JPL
619777	2005 WN_{211}	—	November 26, 2005	Kitt Peak	Spacewatch	·	560 m	MPC; JPL
619778	2005 WL_{213}	—	November 21, 2005	Kitt Peak	Spacewatch	·	620 m	MPC; JPL
619779	2005 WV_{213}	—	November 29, 2005	Kitt Peak	Spacewatch	·	550 m	MPC; JPL
619780	2005 WY_{214}	—	September 27, 2009	Mount Lemmon	Mount Lemmon Survey	·	1.0 km	MPC; JPL
619781	2005 WZ_{216}	—	November 26, 2005	Mount Lemmon	Mount Lemmon Survey	·	1.2 km	MPC; JPL
619782	2005 XJ_{4}	—	November 25, 2005	Catalina	CSS	·	1.2 km	MPC; JPL
619783	2005 XV_{13}	—	December 1, 2005	Kitt Peak	Spacewatch	·	710 m	MPC; JPL
619784	2005 XU_{42}	—	October 22, 2005	Kitt Peak	Spacewatch	·	650 m	MPC; JPL
619785	2005 XE_{65}	—	December 7, 2005	Kitt Peak	Spacewatch	·	1.9 km	MPC; JPL
619786	2005 XB_{120}	—	December 4, 2005	Mount Lemmon	Mount Lemmon Survey	·	610 m	MPC; JPL
619787	2005 XE_{120}	—	March 10, 2003	Palomar	NEAT	·	800 m	MPC; JPL
619788	2005 XM_{122}	—	December 6, 2005	Kitt Peak	Spacewatch	NYS	570 m	MPC; JPL
619789	2005 XN_{123}	—	February 13, 2008	Mount Lemmon	Mount Lemmon Survey	·	2.9 km	MPC; JPL
619790	2005 XN_{132}	—	December 2, 2005	Kitt Peak	Wasserman, L. H., Millis, R. L.	·	1.5 km	MPC; JPL
619791	2005 XZ_{134}	—	December 7, 2005	Kitt Peak	Spacewatch	(5)	830 m	MPC; JPL
619792	2005 YJ_{6}	—	December 8, 2005	Kitt Peak	Spacewatch	(5)	1.0 km	MPC; JPL
619793	2005 YE_{71}	—	December 24, 2005	Kitt Peak	Spacewatch	·	1.5 km	MPC; JPL
619794	2005 YY_{75}	—	December 24, 2005	Kitt Peak	Spacewatch	·	630 m	MPC; JPL
619795	2005 YS_{76}	—	December 24, 2005	Kitt Peak	Spacewatch	·	550 m	MPC; JPL
619796	2005 YH_{83}	—	December 24, 2005	Kitt Peak	Spacewatch	DOR	2.2 km	MPC; JPL
619797	2005 YS_{86}	—	December 25, 2005	Kitt Peak	Spacewatch	·	700 m	MPC; JPL
619798	2005 YB_{90}	—	December 26, 2005	Kitt Peak	Spacewatch	·	520 m	MPC; JPL
619799	2005 YE_{90}	—	December 26, 2005	Mount Lemmon	Mount Lemmon Survey	·	590 m	MPC; JPL
619800	2005 YJ_{103}	—	November 10, 2005	Mount Lemmon	Mount Lemmon Survey	·	3.1 km	MPC; JPL

== 619801–619900 ==
back to top

Designation			Discovery			Properties		Ref
Permanent	Provisional	Named after	Date	Site	Discoverer(s)	Category	Diam.	Ref
619801	2005 YT_{104}	—	December 25, 2005	Kitt Peak	Spacewatch	·	2.5 km	MPC; JPL
619802	2005 YF_{116}	—	December 25, 2005	Kitt Peak	Spacewatch	·	1.6 km	MPC; JPL
619803	2005 YL_{117}	—	December 25, 2005	Kitt Peak	Spacewatch	GEF	950 m	MPC; JPL
619804	2005 YF_{147}	—	December 29, 2005	Mount Lemmon	Mount Lemmon Survey	·	1.4 km	MPC; JPL
619805	2005 YH_{149}	—	December 25, 2005	Kitt Peak	Spacewatch	·	1.5 km	MPC; JPL
619806	2005 YS_{159}	—	December 27, 2005	Kitt Peak	Spacewatch	·	800 m	MPC; JPL
619807	2005 YM_{169}	—	December 30, 2005	Kitt Peak	Spacewatch	·	680 m	MPC; JPL
619808	2005 YV_{183}	—	December 27, 2005	Kitt Peak	Spacewatch	·	810 m	MPC; JPL
619809	2005 YZ_{186}	—	December 28, 2005	Mount Lemmon	Mount Lemmon Survey	·	700 m	MPC; JPL
619810	2005 YX_{193}	—	December 30, 2005	Kitt Peak	Spacewatch	PHO	840 m	MPC; JPL
619811	2005 YB_{206}	—	March 23, 2003	Apache Point	SDSS Collaboration	·	860 m	MPC; JPL
619812	2005 YR_{206}	—	December 27, 2005	Mount Lemmon	Mount Lemmon Survey	·	2.2 km	MPC; JPL
619813	2005 YX_{228}	—	December 25, 2005	Mount Lemmon	Mount Lemmon Survey	AEO	1.0 km	MPC; JPL
619814	2005 YT_{235}	—	December 28, 2005	Kitt Peak	Spacewatch	NYS	800 m	MPC; JPL
619815	2005 YL_{239}	—	December 29, 2005	Kitt Peak	Spacewatch	PHO	690 m	MPC; JPL
619816	2005 YA_{247}	—	December 30, 2005	Mount Lemmon	Mount Lemmon Survey	·	550 m	MPC; JPL
619817	2005 YR_{254}	—	December 30, 2005	Kitt Peak	Spacewatch	·	1.5 km	MPC; JPL
619818	2005 YR_{288}	—	December 29, 2005	Mount Lemmon	Mount Lemmon Survey	·	1.4 km	MPC; JPL
619819	2005 YJ_{297}	—	April 1, 2016	Mount Lemmon	Mount Lemmon Survey	·	1.3 km	MPC; JPL
619820	2005 YH_{300}	—	December 22, 2005	Kitt Peak	Spacewatch	GEF	890 m	MPC; JPL
619821	2006 AF_{26}	—	January 5, 2006	Kitt Peak	Spacewatch	·	1.3 km	MPC; JPL
619822	2006 AW_{51}	—	December 24, 2005	Kitt Peak	Spacewatch	·	690 m	MPC; JPL
619823	2006 AZ_{63}	—	December 25, 2005	Kitt Peak	Spacewatch	·	1.2 km	MPC; JPL
619824	2006 AN_{109}	—	January 5, 2006	Kitt Peak	Spacewatch	NYS	830 m	MPC; JPL
619825	2006 AG_{114}	—	January 13, 2015	Haleakala	Pan-STARRS 1	·	1.3 km	MPC; JPL
619826	2006 BX_{8}	—	January 23, 2006	Piszkéstető	K. Sárneczky	·	1.9 km	MPC; JPL
619827	2006 BO_{48}	—	January 7, 2006	Kitt Peak	Spacewatch	·	1.2 km	MPC; JPL
619828	2006 BH_{65}	—	January 23, 2006	Mount Lemmon	Mount Lemmon Survey	H	530 m	MPC; JPL
619829	2006 BO_{71}	—	January 23, 2006	Kitt Peak	Spacewatch	·	540 m	MPC; JPL
619830	2006 BY_{87}	—	January 25, 2006	Kitt Peak	Spacewatch	·	1.3 km	MPC; JPL
619831	2006 BP_{108}	—	August 20, 2000	Kitt Peak	Spacewatch	V	570 m	MPC; JPL
619832	2006 BX_{109}	—	January 25, 2006	Kitt Peak	Spacewatch	·	560 m	MPC; JPL
619833	2006 BA_{133}	—	January 26, 2006	Kitt Peak	Spacewatch	·	550 m	MPC; JPL
619834	2006 BY_{139}	—	January 19, 2006	Piszkéstető	K. Sárneczky	·	770 m	MPC; JPL
619835	2006 BG_{153}	—	January 25, 2006	Kitt Peak	Spacewatch	·	530 m	MPC; JPL
619836	2006 BK_{170}	—	January 6, 2006	Mount Lemmon	Mount Lemmon Survey	NYS	630 m	MPC; JPL
619837	2006 BJ_{184}	—	January 28, 2006	Mount Lemmon	Mount Lemmon Survey	MAS	600 m	MPC; JPL
619838	2006 BP_{187}	—	January 28, 2006	Kitt Peak	Spacewatch	GEF	870 m	MPC; JPL
619839	2006 BG_{194}	—	January 30, 2006	Kitt Peak	Spacewatch	AGN	1.1 km	MPC; JPL
619840	2006 BV_{196}	—	January 30, 2006	Kitt Peak	Spacewatch	·	580 m	MPC; JPL
619841	2006 BL_{201}	—	January 31, 2006	Kitt Peak	Spacewatch	MAS	600 m	MPC; JPL
619842	2006 BV_{206}	—	January 22, 2006	Mount Lemmon	Mount Lemmon Survey	·	440 m	MPC; JPL
619843	2006 BN_{229}	—	December 1, 2005	Kitt Peak	Wasserman, L. H., Millis, R. L.	·	580 m	MPC; JPL
619844	2006 BR_{230}	—	January 23, 2006	Kitt Peak	Spacewatch	·	1.6 km	MPC; JPL
619845	2006 BZ_{242}	—	January 23, 2006	Kitt Peak	Spacewatch	H	290 m	MPC; JPL
619846	2006 BH_{244}	—	January 31, 2006	Kitt Peak	Spacewatch	·	750 m	MPC; JPL
619847	2006 BX_{251}	—	January 26, 2006	Kitt Peak	Spacewatch	PHO	640 m	MPC; JPL
619848	2006 BA_{253}	—	January 31, 2006	Kitt Peak	Spacewatch	·	520 m	MPC; JPL
619849	2006 BR_{261}	—	March 25, 1999	Kitt Peak	Spacewatch	·	820 m	MPC; JPL
619850	2006 BB_{262}	—	January 31, 2006	Kitt Peak	Spacewatch	·	1.8 km	MPC; JPL
619851	2006 BH_{264}	—	January 31, 2006	Kitt Peak	Spacewatch	·	1.2 km	MPC; JPL
619852	2006 BT_{287}	—	September 8, 2016	Haleakala	Pan-STARRS 1	·	2.6 km	MPC; JPL
619853	2006 BZ_{291}	—	September 25, 2011	Haleakala	Pan-STARRS 1	V	480 m	MPC; JPL
619854	2006 BQ_{297}	—	January 26, 2006	Kitt Peak	Spacewatch	·	640 m	MPC; JPL
619855	2006 CV_{14}	—	February 1, 2006	Kitt Peak	Spacewatch	AGN	840 m	MPC; JPL
619856	2006 CQ_{15}	—	January 23, 2006	Kitt Peak	Spacewatch	·	920 m	MPC; JPL
619857	2006 CZ_{26}	—	February 2, 2006	Kitt Peak	Spacewatch	·	690 m	MPC; JPL
619858	2006 CH_{36}	—	August 25, 2000	Cerro Tololo	Deep Ecliptic Survey	·	810 m	MPC; JPL
619859	2006 CA_{38}	—	February 2, 2006	Mount Lemmon	Mount Lemmon Survey	V	660 m	MPC; JPL
619860	2006 CF_{38}	—	February 2, 2006	Mount Lemmon	Mount Lemmon Survey	·	590 m	MPC; JPL
619861	2006 CU_{42}	—	February 2, 2006	Kitt Peak	Spacewatch	·	720 m	MPC; JPL
619862	2006 CL_{81}	—	February 4, 2006	Mount Lemmon	Mount Lemmon Survey	NYS	840 m	MPC; JPL
619863	2006 CN_{84}	—	December 21, 2008	Mount Lemmon	Mount Lemmon Survey	NYS	990 m	MPC; JPL
619864	2006 CR_{87}	—	February 9, 2016	Haleakala	Pan-STARRS 1	·	1.7 km	MPC; JPL
619865	2006 CZ_{88}	—	February 4, 2006	Mount Lemmon	Mount Lemmon Survey	AGN	840 m	MPC; JPL
619866	2006 DQ_{38}	—	February 21, 2006	Mount Lemmon	Mount Lemmon Survey	NYS	1.0 km	MPC; JPL
619867	2006 DQ_{40}	—	February 22, 2006	Catalina	CSS	·	900 m	MPC; JPL
619868	2006 DD_{57}	—	July 24, 2003	Palomar	NEAT	MAS	750 m	MPC; JPL
619869	2006 DQ_{78}	—	February 24, 2006	Kitt Peak	Spacewatch	·	1.4 km	MPC; JPL
619870	2006 DF_{91}	—	February 24, 2006	Mount Lemmon	Mount Lemmon Survey	·	1.3 km	MPC; JPL
619871	2006 DT_{97}	—	October 31, 2005	Mauna Kea	A. Boattini	·	860 m	MPC; JPL
619872	2006 DX_{100}	—	February 25, 2006	Mount Lemmon	Mount Lemmon Survey	·	1.6 km	MPC; JPL
619873	2006 DO_{110}	—	February 25, 2006	Mount Lemmon	Mount Lemmon Survey	PHO	780 m	MPC; JPL
619874	2006 DB_{111}	—	February 25, 2006	Mount Lemmon	Mount Lemmon Survey	·	1.1 km	MPC; JPL
619875	2006 DU_{114}	—	February 27, 2006	Kitt Peak	Spacewatch	MRX	900 m	MPC; JPL
619876	2006 DC_{149}	—	December 3, 2005	Mauna Kea	A. Boattini	·	1.5 km	MPC; JPL
619877	2006 DZ_{159}	—	February 27, 2006	Kitt Peak	Spacewatch	·	770 m	MPC; JPL
619878	2006 DM_{170}	—	May 18, 1999	Socorro	LINEAR	NYS	1.3 km	MPC; JPL
619879	2006 DF_{172}	—	February 27, 2006	Kitt Peak	Spacewatch	·	740 m	MPC; JPL
619880	2006 DU_{179}	—	February 27, 2006	Mount Lemmon	Mount Lemmon Survey	·	940 m	MPC; JPL
619881	2006 DS_{184}	—	February 27, 2006	Mount Lemmon	Mount Lemmon Survey	·	580 m	MPC; JPL
619882	2006 DL_{222}	—	October 20, 2011	Mount Lemmon	Mount Lemmon Survey	·	890 m	MPC; JPL
619883	2006 EV_{5}	—	January 26, 2006	Mount Lemmon	Mount Lemmon Survey	·	1.0 km	MPC; JPL
619884	2006 EF_{31}	—	March 3, 2006	Kitt Peak	Spacewatch	·	980 m	MPC; JPL
619885	2006 EJ_{34}	—	March 3, 2006	Kitt Peak	Spacewatch	AGN	1.2 km	MPC; JPL
619886	2006 EO_{49}	—	March 4, 2006	Kitt Peak	Spacewatch	HOF	2.1 km	MPC; JPL
619887	2006 EG_{51}	—	March 4, 2006	Kitt Peak	Spacewatch	·	1.7 km	MPC; JPL
619888	2006 EU_{54}	—	February 2, 2006	Kitt Peak	Spacewatch	·	1.2 km	MPC; JPL
619889	2006 EK_{61}	—	March 5, 2006	Kitt Peak	Spacewatch	·	530 m	MPC; JPL
619890	2006 ED_{66}	—	March 5, 2006	Kitt Peak	Spacewatch	·	660 m	MPC; JPL
619891	2006 ET_{77}	—	October 3, 2013	Haleakala	Pan-STARRS 1	·	1.2 km	MPC; JPL
619892	2006 ED_{78}	—	April 5, 2011	Mount Lemmon	Mount Lemmon Survey	DOR	2.0 km	MPC; JPL
619893	2006 ER_{79}	—	September 8, 2011	Kitt Peak	Spacewatch	V	440 m	MPC; JPL
619894	2006 FC_{28}	—	March 24, 2006	Mount Lemmon	Mount Lemmon Survey	·	1.6 km	MPC; JPL
619895	2006 FA_{33}	—	March 23, 2006	Mount Lemmon	Mount Lemmon Survey	·	970 m	MPC; JPL
619896	2006 FF_{57}	—	February 13, 2013	Haleakala	Pan-STARRS 1	·	1.0 km	MPC; JPL
619897	2006 FL_{60}	—	March 23, 2006	Kitt Peak	Spacewatch	·	690 m	MPC; JPL
619898	2006 FH_{61}	—	March 26, 2006	Mount Lemmon	Mount Lemmon Survey	·	790 m	MPC; JPL
619899	2006 GS_{10}	—	April 2, 2006	Kitt Peak	Spacewatch	·	1.3 km	MPC; JPL
619900	2006 GF_{34}	—	March 26, 2006	Kitt Peak	Spacewatch	GEF	1.2 km	MPC; JPL

== 619901–620000 ==
back to top

Designation			Discovery			Properties		Ref
Permanent	Provisional	Named after	Date	Site	Discoverer(s)	Category	Diam.	Ref
619901	2006 GK_{56}	—	November 7, 2015	Mount Lemmon	Mount Lemmon Survey	NYS	870 m	MPC; JPL
619902	2006 GL_{58}	—	October 30, 2008	Kitt Peak	Spacewatch	·	710 m	MPC; JPL
619903	2006 HX_{12}	—	April 19, 2006	Kitt Peak	Spacewatch	·	1.0 km	MPC; JPL
619904	2006 HO_{33}	—	April 19, 2006	Mount Lemmon	Mount Lemmon Survey	·	900 m	MPC; JPL
619905	2006 HR_{62}	—	April 21, 2006	Kitt Peak	Spacewatch	·	1.4 km	MPC; JPL
619906	2006 HZ_{64}	—	April 24, 2006	Kitt Peak	Spacewatch	MAS	620 m	MPC; JPL
619907	2006 HL_{79}	—	April 26, 2006	Kitt Peak	Spacewatch	MAS	590 m	MPC; JPL
619908	2006 HA_{104}	—	April 30, 2006	Kitt Peak	Spacewatch	PHO	840 m	MPC; JPL
619909	2006 HX_{128}	—	April 26, 2006	Cerro Tololo	Deep Ecliptic Survey	·	1.2 km	MPC; JPL
619910	2006 HL_{155}	—	April 24, 2006	Kitt Peak	Spacewatch	BRA	1.5 km	MPC; JPL
619911	2006 HF_{159}	—	April 25, 2006	Kitt Peak	Spacewatch	·	1.2 km	MPC; JPL
619912	2006 HV_{159}	—	April 19, 2006	Kitt Peak	Spacewatch	·	890 m	MPC; JPL
619913	2006 JL_{75}	—	May 23, 2006	Mount Lemmon	Mount Lemmon Survey	MAS	530 m	MPC; JPL
619914	2006 JG_{87}	—	July 28, 2014	Haleakala	Pan-STARRS 1	NYS	870 m	MPC; JPL
619915	2006 KC_{21}	—	May 20, 2006	Kitt Peak	Spacewatch	·	1.1 km	MPC; JPL
619916	2006 KG_{34}	—	May 20, 2006	Kitt Peak	Spacewatch	PHO	770 m	MPC; JPL
619917	2006 KH_{42}	—	May 20, 2006	Kitt Peak	Spacewatch	KOR	1.3 km	MPC; JPL
619918	2006 KA_{65}	—	May 1, 2006	Kitt Peak	Spacewatch	·	1.0 km	MPC; JPL
619919	2006 KW_{65}	—	May 24, 2006	Kitt Peak	Spacewatch	·	1.5 km	MPC; JPL
619920	2006 KY_{86}	—	May 26, 2006	Socorro	LINEAR	APO · PHA	400 m	MPC; JPL
619921	2006 KC_{93}	—	May 25, 2006	Kitt Peak	Spacewatch	KOR	1.2 km	MPC; JPL
619922	2006 KJ_{93}	—	May 21, 2006	Kitt Peak	Spacewatch	KOR	1.3 km	MPC; JPL
619923	2006 KS_{130}	—	May 25, 2006	Mauna Kea	P. A. Wiegert	·	890 m	MPC; JPL
619924	2006 KF_{149}	—	May 30, 2014	Haleakala	Pan-STARRS 1	H	450 m	MPC; JPL
619925	2006 KY_{155}	—	May 20, 2006	Kitt Peak	Spacewatch	NYS	740 m	MPC; JPL
619926	2006 MA	—	June 18, 2006	Kitt Peak	Spacewatch	AMO	570 m	MPC; JPL
619927	2006 OT_{30}	—	November 20, 2003	Kitt Peak	Spacewatch	·	1.1 km	MPC; JPL
619928	2006 OP_{33}	—	March 16, 2005	Mount Lemmon	Mount Lemmon Survey	MAS	570 m	MPC; JPL
619929	2006 OS_{38}	—	February 27, 2009	Kitt Peak	Spacewatch	MAS	680 m	MPC; JPL
619930	2006 OA_{40}	—	October 22, 2012	Haleakala	Pan-STARRS 1	·	1.7 km	MPC; JPL
619931	2006 QF_{154}	—	August 19, 2006	Kitt Peak	Spacewatch	·	1.1 km	MPC; JPL
619932	2006 QB_{189}	—	September 2, 2017	Haleakala	Pan-STARRS 1	·	1.9 km	MPC; JPL
619933	2006 QP_{195}	—	July 15, 2016	Mount Lemmon	Mount Lemmon Survey	·	1.4 km	MPC; JPL
619934	2006 QY_{206}	—	August 27, 2006	Kitt Peak	Spacewatch	·	1.3 km	MPC; JPL
619935	2006 RG_{54}	—	September 14, 2006	Kitt Peak	Spacewatch	ANF	1.2 km	MPC; JPL
619936	2006 RK_{79}	—	September 15, 2006	Kitt Peak	Spacewatch	·	1.5 km	MPC; JPL
619937	2006 RZ_{108}	—	September 14, 2006	Mauna Kea	Masiero, J., R. Jedicke	·	440 m	MPC; JPL
619938	2006 RM_{111}	—	September 14, 2006	Mauna Kea	Masiero, J., R. Jedicke	EOS	1.2 km	MPC; JPL
619939	2006 RD_{116}	—	September 14, 2006	Mauna Kea	J. Masiero, R. Jedicke	·	1.0 km	MPC; JPL
619940	2006 RV_{119}	—	October 21, 2006	Mount Lemmon	Mount Lemmon Survey	·	1.4 km	MPC; JPL
619941	2006 SJ_{177}	—	September 25, 2006	Kitt Peak	Spacewatch	·	510 m	MPC; JPL
619942	2006 SL_{192}	—	September 26, 2006	Mount Lemmon	Mount Lemmon Survey	·	1.4 km	MPC; JPL
619943	2006 SP_{258}	—	September 26, 2006	Kitt Peak	Spacewatch	·	2.1 km	MPC; JPL
619944	2006 ST_{301}	—	September 26, 2006	Catalina	CSS	·	2.2 km	MPC; JPL
619945	2006 SZ_{375}	—	September 17, 2006	Apache Point	SDSS Collaboration	·	2.3 km	MPC; JPL
619946	2006 ST_{377}	—	September 17, 2006	Apache Point	SDSS Collaboration	·	2.2 km	MPC; JPL
619947	2006 SK_{384}	—	September 18, 2006	Apache Point	SDSS Collaboration	·	1.6 km	MPC; JPL
619948	2006 SG_{386}	—	September 29, 2006	Apache Point	SDSS Collaboration	·	1.1 km	MPC; JPL
619949	2006 SC_{416}	—	September 19, 2006	Kitt Peak	Spacewatch	·	830 m	MPC; JPL
619950	2006 SX_{422}	—	September 25, 2006	Catalina	CSS	H	460 m	MPC; JPL
619951	2006 SF_{428}	—	September 27, 2006	Kitt Peak	Spacewatch	·	1.9 km	MPC; JPL
619952	2006 SX_{437}	—	September 28, 2006	Mount Lemmon	Mount Lemmon Survey	·	2.2 km	MPC; JPL
619953	2006 SP_{440}	—	September 17, 2006	Kitt Peak	Spacewatch	EOS	1.5 km	MPC; JPL
619954	2006 SW_{441}	—	September 28, 2006	Kitt Peak	Spacewatch	·	1.8 km	MPC; JPL
619955	2006 SA_{443}	—	September 17, 2006	Kitt Peak	Spacewatch	EOS	1.3 km	MPC; JPL
619956	2006 SU_{443}	—	September 20, 2006	Kitt Peak	Spacewatch	·	1.7 km	MPC; JPL
619957	2006 ST_{444}	—	January 24, 2014	Haleakala	Pan-STARRS 1	·	490 m	MPC; JPL
619958	2006 SQ_{456}	—	September 18, 2006	Kitt Peak	Spacewatch	·	550 m	MPC; JPL
619959	2006 SL_{459}	—	September 26, 2006	Kitt Peak	Spacewatch	3:2	3.3 km	MPC; JPL
619960	2006 TG_{60}	—	October 13, 2006	Kitt Peak	Spacewatch	T_{j} (2.99)	2.9 km	MPC; JPL
619961	2006 TY_{65}	—	October 11, 2006	Kitt Peak	Spacewatch	·	1.8 km	MPC; JPL
619962	2006 TB_{111}	—	October 1, 2006	Apache Point	SDSS Collaboration	·	1.6 km	MPC; JPL
619963	2006 TR_{114}	—	October 1, 2006	Apache Point	SDSS Collaboration	EOS	1.3 km	MPC; JPL
619964	2006 TP_{115}	—	October 1, 2006	Apache Point	SDSS Collaboration	·	1.0 km	MPC; JPL
619965	2006 TJ_{121}	—	October 12, 2006	Apache Point	SDSS Collaboration	·	950 m	MPC; JPL
619966	2006 TL_{131}	—	October 2, 2006	Mount Lemmon	Mount Lemmon Survey	·	2.1 km	MPC; JPL
619967	2006 TD_{136}	—	October 4, 2006	Mount Lemmon	Mount Lemmon Survey	·	830 m	MPC; JPL
619968	2006 TF_{138}	—	October 2, 2006	Mount Lemmon	Mount Lemmon Survey	·	2.0 km	MPC; JPL
619969	2006 TH_{138}	—	October 13, 2006	Kitt Peak	Spacewatch	·	700 m	MPC; JPL
619970	2006 TY_{138}	—	January 18, 2008	Kitt Peak	Spacewatch	·	1.5 km	MPC; JPL
619971	2006 UP_{27}	—	October 16, 2006	Kitt Peak	Spacewatch	·	700 m	MPC; JPL
619972	2006 UB_{42}	—	October 16, 2006	Kitt Peak	Spacewatch	·	620 m	MPC; JPL
619973	2006 UL_{49}	—	September 28, 2006	Kitt Peak	Spacewatch	·	830 m	MPC; JPL
619974	2006 UM_{51}	—	September 24, 2006	Kitt Peak	Spacewatch	·	1.7 km	MPC; JPL
619975	2006 UP_{70}	—	October 16, 2006	Catalina	CSS	H	500 m	MPC; JPL
619976	2006 UZ_{92}	—	September 26, 2006	Mount Lemmon	Mount Lemmon Survey	·	1.8 km	MPC; JPL
619977	2006 UT_{99}	—	October 18, 2006	Kitt Peak	Spacewatch	·	1.8 km	MPC; JPL
619978	2006 UB_{113}	—	October 2, 2006	Kitt Peak	Spacewatch	·	770 m	MPC; JPL
619979	2006 UF_{114}	—	September 18, 2006	Kitt Peak	Spacewatch	EMA	2.0 km	MPC; JPL
619980	2006 UG_{132}	—	March 29, 2004	Kitt Peak	Spacewatch	·	2.6 km	MPC; JPL
619981	2006 UB_{156}	—	October 21, 2006	Mount Lemmon	Mount Lemmon Survey	·	2.2 km	MPC; JPL
619982	2006 UK_{156}	—	October 21, 2006	Mount Lemmon	Mount Lemmon Survey	·	1.9 km	MPC; JPL
619983	2006 UC_{163}	—	October 1, 2006	Kitt Peak	Spacewatch	·	1.8 km	MPC; JPL
619984	2006 UJ_{165}	—	October 21, 2006	Mount Lemmon	Mount Lemmon Survey	·	1.1 km	MPC; JPL
619985	2006 UA_{176}	—	September 14, 2006	Kitt Peak	Spacewatch	EOS	1.9 km	MPC; JPL
619986	2006 UW_{194}	—	October 20, 2006	Kitt Peak	Spacewatch	·	1.8 km	MPC; JPL
619987	2006 UY_{198}	—	September 28, 2006	Mount Lemmon	Mount Lemmon Survey	·	880 m	MPC; JPL
619988	2006 UJ_{225}	—	October 11, 2006	Palomar	NEAT	H	630 m	MPC; JPL
619989	2006 UO_{231}	—	October 2, 2006	Mount Lemmon	Mount Lemmon Survey	·	660 m	MPC; JPL
619990	2006 UT_{244}	—	October 12, 2006	Kitt Peak	Spacewatch	·	510 m	MPC; JPL
619991	2006 UD_{250}	—	October 27, 2006	Mount Lemmon	Mount Lemmon Survey	·	2.0 km	MPC; JPL
619992	2006 US_{257}	—	October 28, 2006	Mount Lemmon	Mount Lemmon Survey	·	970 m	MPC; JPL
619993	2006 UO_{268}	—	October 27, 2006	Mount Lemmon	Mount Lemmon Survey	T_{j} (2.99) · 3:2 · SHU	3.0 km	MPC; JPL
619994	2006 UM_{280}	—	October 28, 2006	Mount Lemmon	Mount Lemmon Survey	THM	2.0 km	MPC; JPL
619995	2006 UV_{288}	—	October 16, 2006	Kitt Peak	Spacewatch	·	2.0 km	MPC; JPL
619996	2006 UL_{300}	—	October 19, 2006	Kitt Peak	Deep Ecliptic Survey	·	1.7 km	MPC; JPL
619997	2006 UM_{330}	—	October 16, 2006	Apache Point	SDSS Collaboration	·	2.1 km	MPC; JPL
619998	2006 UA_{335}	—	October 22, 2006	Mount Lemmon	Mount Lemmon Survey	H	500 m	MPC; JPL
619999	2006 UP_{363}	—	October 16, 2006	Mount Lemmon	Mount Lemmon Survey	·	1.6 km	MPC; JPL
620000	2019 YS_{4}	—	December 30, 2019	Haleakala	Pan-STARRS 1	APO	360 m	MPC; JPL

back to top

== Meaning of names ==
As minor planet discoveries are confirmed, they are given a permanent number by the IAU's Minor Planet Center (MPC), and the discoverers can then submit names for them, following the IAU's naming conventions. The list below concerns those minor planets in the specified number-range that have received names, and explains the meanings of those names.

Official naming citations of newly named small Solar System bodies are approved and published in a bulletin by IAU's Working Group for Small Bodies Nomenclature (WGSBN). Before May 2021, citations were published in MPC's Minor Planet Circulars for many decades. Recent citations can also be found on the JPL Small-Body Database (SBDB). Until his death in 2016, German astronomer Lutz D. Schmadel compiled these citations into the Dictionary of Minor Planet Names (DMP) and regularly updated the collection.

Based on Paul Herget's The Names of the Minor Planets, Schmadel also researched the unclear origin of numerous asteroids, most of which had been named prior to World War II. This article incorporates text from this source, which is in the public domain: SBDB New namings may only be added to this list below after official publication as the preannouncement of names is condemned. The WGSBN publishes a comprehensive guideline for the naming rules of non-cometary small Solar System bodies.

Named minor planet	Provisional	This minor planet was named for...	Ref; Catalog
619137 Klausjugelt	2005 TM_{30}	Klaus Jugelt, a retired German teacher of mathematics, physics and astronomy.	IAU · 619137
