= Macy's (disambiguation) =

Macy's, can refer to:

- Macy's, Inc., formerly Federated Department Stores, Inc., parent company of Macy's (department store) and Bloomingdales
  - Macy's (department store), also known as R.H. Macy & Co.
  - Macy's West

== See also ==
- Macy (surname)
