= 21795 Masi =

Main-belt asteroid

Discovery
- Discovered by: F. Mallia
- Discovery site: Campo Catino Obs.
- Discovery date: 29 September 1999

Designations
- Named after: Gianluca Masi (Italian astronomer)
- Alternative designations: 1999 SN_{9} · 1988 UE; 1993 BZ_{1}
- Minor planet category: main-belt · (inner); Nysa–Polana complex

Orbital characteristics
- Epoch 23 March 2018 (JD 2458200.5)
- Uncertainty parameter 0
- Observation arc: 64.45 yr (23,541 d)
- Aphelion: 2.8409 AU
- Perihelion: 1.9222 AU
- Semi-major axis: 2.3815 AU
- Eccentricity: 0.1929
- Orbital period (sidereal): 3.68 yr (1,342 d)
- Mean anomaly: 337.35°
- Mean motion: 0° 16^{m} 5.52^{s} / day
- Inclination: 1.8376°
- Longitude of ascending node: 337.09°
- Argument of perihelion: 81.681°

Physical characteristics
- Mean diameter: 2.45 km (calculated); 3.150±0.164 km
- Synodic rotation period: 13.862±0.0121 h
- Geometric albedo: 0.20 (assumed); 0.235±0.037
- Spectral type: S (assumed)
- Absolute magnitude (H): 14.7; 14.9; 14.970±0.004 (R); 15.41±0.14; 15.42

21795 Masi (provisional designation 1999 SN_{9}) is an asteroid from the inner regions of the asteroid belt, approximately 3 kilometers (2 miles) in diameter. It was discovered on 29 September 1999, by Italian amateur astronomer Franco Mallia at the Campo Catino Astronomical Observatory in Lazio, Italy. The likely S-type asteroid has a rotation period of 13.86 hours. It was named for Italian astronomer Gianluca Masi.

== Orbit and classification ==
Masi is member of the Nysa–Polana complex, a collection of overlapping asteroid families. It orbits the Sun in the inner main-belt at a distance of 1.9–2.8 AU once every 3 years and 8 months (1,342 days; semi-major axis of 2.38 AU). Its orbit has an eccentricity of 0.19 and an inclination of 2° with respect to the ecliptic. The body's observation arc begins with a precovery published by the Digitized Sky Survey and taken at the Palomar Observatory in April 1954, more than 45 years prior to its official discovery observation at Campo Catino.

=== Rotation period ===
In September 2010, a rotational lightcurve of Masi was obtained from photometric observations in the R-band by astronomers at the Palomar Transient Factory in California. Lightcurve analysis gave a rotation period of 13.862 hours with a relatively high brightness amplitude of 0.68 magnitude (U=2).

=== Diameter and albedo ===
According to the survey carried out by the NEOWISE mission of NASA's Wide-field Infrared Survey Explorer, Masi measures 3.150 kilometers in diameter and its surface has an albedo of 0.235, while the Collaborative Asteroid Lightcurve Link assumes a standard albedo for a stony asteroid of 0.20, and calculates a diameter of 2.45 kilometers based on an absolute magnitude of 15.42.

== Naming ==
This minor planet was named after Italian astrophysicist and astronomer, Gianluca Masi (born 1972), a researcher and discoverer of minor planets and variable stars, who became an avid amateur astronomer when he was 8 years old. The official naming citation was published by the Minor Planet Center on 9 May 2001 (M.P.C. 42679).
