= De Masi =

De Masi is an Italian surname. Notable people with the surname include:

- Arianna De Masi (born 1999), Italian sprinter
- Domenico De Masi (1938–2023), Italian sociologist
- Fabio De Masi (born 1980), German politician of Italian descent
- Francesco De Masi (1930–2005), Italian conductor and film score composer
- Piero De Masi (1937–2021), Italian ambassador

== See also ==
- Lance de Masi (born 1949), former president of the American University in Dubai
- Giuseppe Di Masi (born 1981), Italian football player and coach
