= Macey =

Macey may refer to:

== Places ==
- Macey, Aube, a commune in the Aube département, France
- Macey, Manche, a former commune in the Manche département, France
- Mount Macey, Mac. Robertson Land, Antarctica
- Macey Cone, Australian Territory of Heard Island and McDonald Islands, a hill

== People ==
- Adrian Macey (born 1948), New Zealand diplomat, ambassador to France and formerly to Thailand
- David Macey (1949–2011), English translator and historian
- Dean Macey (born 1977), English decathlete and bobsledder
- Frank Macey (1894–1973), English amateur footballer
- Hubert Macey (1921–2008), Canadian ice hockey player
- John Macey (born 1947), English former football goalkeeper
- Jonathan R. Macey, Yale Law School professor
- Jordan Macey (born 1983), Australian rugby union player
- Lance Macey (1881–1950), New Zealand lawn bowler
- Matt Macey (born 1994), English football goalkeeper
- Melanie Macey, American politician
- Reg Macey (born 1936), Australian former politician
- Macey (baseball), baseball player, first name unknown
- Macey Brooks (born 1975), American former National Football League player
- Macey Cruthird (born 1992), American actress
- Macey Harlam (1873–1923), American stage and screen actor
- Macey Stewart (born 1996), Australian racing cyclist

== Fictional characters ==
On the British soap opera Emmerdale:

- Charity Macey
- Declan Macey
- Dermot Macey
- Eliza Macey
- Ella Macey
- Katie Macey
- Megan Macey
- Noah Macey

== See also ==
- Macy (disambiguation)
