= Maci =

Maci may refer to:

- Maci, Guinea, a town and sub-prefecture in the Pita Prefecture in the Mamou Region of northern-central Guinea
- Iceve-Maci, a Tivoid language of the Cameroons
- Maci (medical treatment), a treatment for joint degeneration
- Maci (footballer), a Romanian beach soccer player
- Maci Bookout (born 1991), American reality television personality, author, and public speaker
- Maci (politician) (1652–1739), politician of Qing China
- Rexhep Maçi (1912–1980), Albanian football player

== See also ==
- Masi (disambiguation)
