= Lance de Masi =

Lance Edward de Masi (born December 26,1949) is a former president of the American University in Dubai.

== Early life ==
Lance de Masi holds a B.A. (summa cum laude) in Spanish from St. John Fisher College and both an M.A.(Hispanic Language and Literature) and M.B.A.(Marketing) from Indiana University at Bloomington. During the second year of his M.A., he participated in a study abroad program sponsored by Indiana University, for which he was given a Fulbright travel grant. As part of this program, he studied at the Universidad Complutense de Madrid. He was honored with a Doctorate of Humane Letters in 1997, awarded by Schiller International University. Lance de Masi is trilingual, and can speak English, Spanish and Italian. He is also proficient in conversational French.

== Career ==
De Masi has held his position at the American University in Dubai since 1997. Before joining the university in 1995, he served in management positions at Leo Burnett, the Interpublic Group of Companies and BBDO Worldwide, where he was executive vice president and chief operating officer of IMPACT/BBDO from 1990 to 1996. He had previously held management-level positions at BBDO in Nicosia and London. His two-decade-long communications career began in the US, before taking him to Italy, Spain, Cyprus, the UK and finally, the UAE. The key clients he served during his communications career include Procter & Gamble, Henkel, Beecham, Gillette, Johnson & Johnson, Mercedes-Benz, General Motors, Gucci and Dunhill.

Lance de Masi considers himself first and foremost to be a Hispanist, who is committed to the understanding and diffusion of the cultures of Spain and other Spanish-speaking countries of the world. The focus of his interest is twentieth-century Spanish literature and Spanish political history. He first visited Spain in 1970, participating in a summer study abroad program at the Universidad de Valencia.

== Retirement ==
In mid-January, 2018, Lance de Masi announced that he would be retiring at the end of the year (i.e., December), noting that he would retain his position as a member of the AUD Governing Board.
