= Gianluca Masi =

Italian astronomer (1972-)

Minor planets discovered: 26
see § List of discovered minor planets

Gianluca Masi (born 22 January 1972) is an Italian astrophysicist and astronomer, as well as a discoverer of minor planets and variable stars.

== Career ==
He started his interest in astronomy in childhood, later becoming a professional astronomer, earning a PhD in astronomy at the Sapienza University of Rome in 2006. At the same time, he devoted a lot of effort to science communication, on the international stage.

His professional interests include asteroids and comets, variable stars and extrasolar planets, with many contributions in all those fields. He was able to determine the date that Vincent van Gogh painted Starry Night Over the Rhone by studying the star placement.

In 2006 he started the Virtual Telescope project (part of Bellatrix Astronomical Observatory), consisting of several robotic telescopes, remotely available in real-time over the Internet. Through this system, real-time online observations are performed; sharing the universe with the world. More than 1,000,000 individuals each year observe the sky through the Virtual Telescope.

== Awards and honors ==
He received a number of prizes, including the Ruggieri Prize (2003), the Gene Shoemaker NEO Grant (2005) and the Tacchini Prize (2006) as well as other acknowledgements for his scientific activities. The main-belt asteroid 21795 Masi, discovered by his colleague Franco Mallia in 1999, was named in his honor.

== List of discovered minor planets ==
| 10931 Ceccano | 16 February 1998 | list |
| 20433 Prestinenza | 14 February 1999 | list |
| 20513 Lazio | 10 September 1999 | list^{[A]} |
| 21661 Olgagermani | 1 September 1999 | list |
| 21685 Francomallia | 11 September 1999 | list |
| 21799 Ciociaria | 1 October 1999 | list^{[A]} |
| 25337 Elisabetta | 6 August 1999 | list |
| 40409 Taichikato | 6 September 1999 | list |
| 49501 Basso | 13 February 1999 | list |
| 65487 Divinacommedia | 9 February 2003 | list^{[B]} |
| 66458 Romaplanetario | 22 August 1999 | list |
| 73453 Ninomanfredi | 13 July 2002 | list^{[A]} |
| 74625 Tieproject | 10 September 1999 | list^{[A]} |
| 79641 Daniloceirani | 19 September 1998 | list^{[A]} |
| (95784) 2003 FS_{6} | 28 March 2003 | list |

| 98722 Elenaumberto | 22 December 2000 | list |
| 101902 Gisellaluccone | 3 September 1999 | list |
| 145820 Valeromeo | 15 October 1998 | list |
| 216591 Coetzee | 21 July 2002 | list |
| (220296) 2003 CX_{20} | 13 February 2003 | list^{[B]} |
| 243637 Frosinone | 8 October 1999 | list |
| (253311) 2003 CC_{20} | 11 February 2003 | list^{[B]} |
| 269762 Nocentini | 4 October 1999 | list |
| (317631) 2003 CB_{20} | 11 February 2003 | list^{[B]} |
| (317633) 2003 CY_{20} | 13 February 2003 | list^{[B]} |
| (435127) 2007 EE_{88} | 14 March 2007 | list |
Co-discovery made with:^{A} F. Mallia^{B} R. Michelsen

== See also ==
- Supernova ASASSN-15lh
- List of minor planet discoverers § G. Masi
