= Macy (surname) =

Macy is a surname. Notable people with the name include:

- Anne Sullivan Macy (1866–1936), teacher of Helen Keller (better known as Anne Sullivan)
- Bill Macy (1922–2019), actor
- Jesse Macy (1842–1919), political scientist and historian
- Joanna Macy (1929–2025), environmental activist and author
- John B. Macy (1799–1856), U.S. Representative from Wisconsin
- Kyle Macy (born 1957), American basketball player, coach, and broadcaster
- Richard J. Macy (1930–2022), justice of the Wyoming Supreme Court
- Robin Lynn Macy, founding member of the country group The Chicks
- Rowland Hussey Macy Sr. (1822–1877), American department store founder
- Thomas Macy (1608–1682), settler
- William H. Macy (born 1950), American actor
- Tom Macy (born 1978), American actor
