= List of minor planets: 21001–22000 =

The following is a partial list of minor planets, running from minor-planet number 21001 through 22000, inclusive. The primary data for this and other partial lists is based on JPL's "Small-Body Orbital Elements" and data available from the Minor Planet Center. Critical list information is also provided by the MPC, unless otherwise specified from Lowell Observatory. A detailed description of the table's columns and additional sources are given on the main page including a complete list of every page in this series, and a statistical break-up on the dynamical classification of minor planets.

Also see the summary list of all named bodies in numerical and alphabetical order, and the corresponding naming citations for the number range of this particular list. New namings may only be added to this list after official publication, as the preannouncement of names is condemned by the Working Group for Small Bodies Nomenclature of the International Astronomical Union.

Near-Earth obj.	MBA (inner)	MBA (outer)	Centaur
Mars-crosser	MBA (middle)	Jupiter trojan	Trans-Neptunian obj.
Unclassified

== 21001–21100 ==
Designation			Discovery			Properties		Ref
Permanent	Provisional	Named after	Date	Site	Discoverer(s)	Category	Diam.	Ref
21001 Trogrlic	1987 GF	Trogrlic	April 1, 1987	Palomar	A. Maury	·	3.4 km	MPC · JPL
21002	1987 QU_{7}	—	August 29, 1987	La Silla	E. W. Elst	slow	3.6 km	MPC · JPL
21003	1987 YV_{1}	—	December 17, 1987	La Silla	E. W. Elst, G. Pizarro	EUN	3.9 km	MPC · JPL
21004 Thérèsemarjou	1988 BM_{4}	Thérèsemarjou	January 22, 1988	La Silla	H. Debehogne	·	3.6 km	MPC · JPL
21005	1988 BF_{5}	—	January 28, 1988	Siding Spring	R. H. McNaught	ADE	8.2 km	MPC · JPL
21006	1988 DG_{2}	—	February 17, 1988	La Silla	E. W. Elst	·	3.1 km	MPC · JPL
21007 Lo Campo	1988 FD_{3}	Lo Campo	March 19, 1988	La Silla	W. Ferreri	·	3.4 km	MPC · JPL
21008 Ottewell	1988 PE	Ottewell	August 9, 1988	Palomar	E. F. Helin	·	4.2 km	MPC · JPL
21009 Agilkia	1988 PN_{1}	Agilkia	August 12, 1988	Haute Provence	E. W. Elst	NYS	4.8 km	MPC · JPL
21010 Kishon	1988 PL_{2}	Kishon	August 13, 1988	Tautenburg Observatory	F. Börngen	·	2.6 km	MPC · JPL
21011 Johannaterlinden	1988 RP_{4}	Johannaterlinden	September 1, 1988	La Silla	H. Debehogne	·	4.1 km	MPC · JPL
21012	1988 RU_{9}	—	September 8, 1988	La Silla	H. Debehogne	·	6.2 km	MPC · JPL
21013	1988 RW_{10}	—	September 14, 1988	Cerro Tololo	S. J. Bus	·	6.0 km	MPC · JPL
21014 Daishi	1988 TS_{1}	Daishi	October 13, 1988	Geisei	T. Seki	·	7.7 km	MPC · JPL
21015 Shigenari	1988 UF	Shigenari	October 16, 1988	Kitami	T. Fujii, K. Watanabe	EOS	9.1 km	MPC · JPL
21016 Miyazawaseiroku	1988 VA	Miyazawaseiroku	November 2, 1988	Geisei	T. Seki	·	4.8 km	MPC · JPL
21017	1988 VP	—	November 3, 1988	Yorii	M. Arai, H. Mori	·	6.7 km	MPC · JPL
21018	1988 VV_{1}	—	November 2, 1988	Gekko	Y. Oshima	·	15 km	MPC · JPL
21019	1988 VC_{2}	—	November 2, 1988	Kushiro	S. Ueda, H. Kaneda	HYG	10 km	MPC · JPL
21020	1988 VH_{2}	—	November 8, 1988	Okutama	Hioki, T., N. Kawasato	·	6.4 km	MPC · JPL
21021	1988 XL_{2}	—	December 7, 1988	Gekko	Y. Oshima	·	15 km	MPC · JPL
21022 Ike	1989 CR	Ike	February 2, 1989	Geisei	T. Seki	·	8.1 km	MPC · JPL
21023	1989 DK	—	February 28, 1989	La Silla	H. Debehogne	EUN	7.3 km	MPC · JPL
21024	1989 GD_{3}	—	April 3, 1989	La Silla	E. W. Elst	EUN	4.3 km	MPC · JPL
21025	1989 SL_{2}	—	September 26, 1989	La Silla	E. W. Elst	·	2.5 km	MPC · JPL
21026	1989 SE_{4}	—	September 26, 1989	La Silla	E. W. Elst	·	2.0 km	MPC · JPL
21027	1989 SR_{5}	—	September 28, 1989	La Silla	E. W. Elst	KOR	4.4 km	MPC · JPL
21028	1989 TO	—	October 4, 1989	Palomar	E. F. Helin	PHO	5.7 km	MPC · JPL
21029 Adorno	1989 TA_{6}	Adorno	October 7, 1989	La Silla	E. W. Elst	KOR	4.5 km	MPC · JPL
21030	1989 TZ_{11}	—	October 2, 1989	Cerro Tololo	S. J. Bus	·	3.9 km	MPC · JPL
21031	1989 TO_{15}	—	October 3, 1989	La Silla	H. Debehogne	·	1.8 km	MPC · JPL
21032	1989 TN_{16}	—	October 4, 1989	La Silla	H. Debehogne	·	2.9 km	MPC · JPL
21033 Akahirakiyozo	1989 UM	Akahirakiyozo	October 21, 1989	Kitami	K. Endate, K. Watanabe	·	3.1 km	MPC · JPL
21034	1989 WB_{3}	—	November 25, 1989	Gekko	Y. Oshima	·	6.8 km	MPC · JPL
21035 Iwabu	1990 AE	Iwabu	January 1, 1990	Kitami	K. Endate, K. Watanabe	·	3.4 km	MPC · JPL
21036 Nakamurayoshi	1990 BA_{2}	Nakamurayoshi	January 30, 1990	Kushiro	Matsuyama, M., K. Watanabe	·	10 km	MPC · JPL
21037	1990 EB	—	March 4, 1990	Dynic	A. Sugie	PHO	5.9 km	MPC · JPL
21038 Bazzano	1990 EP_{3}	Bazzano	March 2, 1990	La Silla	E. W. Elst	·	12 km	MPC · JPL
21039 Zank	1990 ES_{4}	Zank	March 2, 1990	La Silla	E. W. Elst	NYS	2.4 km	MPC · JPL
21040 Güntherreitz	1990 OZ	Güntherreitz	July 20, 1990	Palomar	E. F. Helin	EUN	4.5 km	MPC · JPL
21041 Wangjinsong	1990 QO_{1}	Wangjinsong	August 22, 1990	Palomar	H. E. Holt	EOS	9.1 km	MPC · JPL
21042 Sibeck	1990 QT_{7}	Sibeck	August 16, 1990	La Silla	E. W. Elst	THM	9.6 km	MPC · JPL
21043 Pascalwillis	1990 RT_{2}	Pascalwillis	September 15, 1990	Palomar	H. E. Holt	EUN	5.6 km	MPC · JPL
21044 Rummel	1990 SE_{1}	Rummel	September 16, 1990	Palomar	H. E. Holt	EUN	3.8 km	MPC · JPL
21045 Juangabriel	1990 SQ_{1}	Juangabriel	September 18, 1990	Palomar	H. E. Holt	ADE	8.2 km	MPC · JPL
21046	1990 SH_{3}	—	September 18, 1990	Palomar	H. E. Holt	·	8.6 km	MPC · JPL
21047 Hodierna	1990 SE_{5}	Hodierna	September 22, 1990	La Silla	E. W. Elst	3:2	16 km	MPC · JPL
21048	1990 SV_{9}	—	September 22, 1990	La Silla	E. W. Elst	·	1.8 km	MPC · JPL
21049	1990 SU_{16}	—	September 17, 1990	Palomar	H. E. Holt	·	5.4 km	MPC · JPL
21050 Beck	1990 TG_{2}	Beck	October 10, 1990	Tautenburg Observatory	L. D. Schmadel, F. Börngen	·	3.5 km	MPC · JPL
21051	1990 UM	—	October 20, 1990	Oohira	T. Urata	·	7.0 km	MPC · JPL
21052	1990 UG_{5}	—	October 16, 1990	La Silla	E. W. Elst	·	4.5 km	MPC · JPL
21053	1990 VE	—	November 10, 1990	Yakiimo	Natori, A., T. Urata	·	5.5 km	MPC · JPL
21054 Ojmjakon	1990 VL_{5}	Ojmjakon	November 15, 1990	La Silla	E. W. Elst	EOS	11 km	MPC · JPL
21055	1990 YR	—	December 23, 1990	Okutama	Hioki, T., Hayakawa, S.	·	8.3 km	MPC · JPL
21056	1991 CA_{1}	—	February 14, 1991	Palomar	E. F. Helin	H	2.4 km	MPC · JPL
21057 Garikisraelian	1991 GJ_{8}	Garikisraelian	April 8, 1991	La Silla	E. W. Elst	·	2.4 km	MPC · JPL
21058	1991 GF_{9}	—	April 10, 1991	La Silla	E. W. Elst	·	2.5 km	MPC · JPL
21059 Penderecki	1991 GR_{10}	Penderecki	April 9, 1991	Tautenburg Observatory	F. Börngen	EOS	5.8 km	MPC · JPL
21060	1991 JC	—	May 2, 1991	Oohira	T. Urata	·	4.2 km	MPC · JPL
21061	1991 JD	—	May 3, 1991	Oohira	T. Urata	NYS	4.8 km	MPC · JPL
21062 Iasky	1991 JW_{1}	Iasky	May 13, 1991	Palomar	C. S. Shoemaker, E. M. Shoemaker	·	19 km	MPC · JPL
21063	1991 JC_{2}	—	May 8, 1991	Siding Spring	R. H. McNaught	·	2.9 km	MPC · JPL
21064 Yangliwei	1991 LY_{1}	Yangliwei	June 6, 1991	La Silla	E. W. Elst	THM	7.5 km	MPC · JPL
21065 Jamesmelka	1991 NM	Jamesmelka	July 10, 1991	Palomar	E. F. Helin	·	15 km	MPC · JPL
21066	1991 NG_{5}	—	July 10, 1991	La Silla	H. Debehogne	ERI	6.6 km	MPC · JPL
21067	1991 PY_{1}	—	August 2, 1991	La Silla	E. W. Elst	V	2.1 km	MPC · JPL
21068	1991 PL_{2}	—	August 2, 1991	La Silla	E. W. Elst	·	2.8 km	MPC · JPL
21069	1991 PY_{3}	—	August 3, 1991	La Silla	E. W. Elst	·	4.0 km	MPC · JPL
21070	1991 PD_{6}	—	August 6, 1991	La Silla	E. W. Elst	·	3.0 km	MPC · JPL
21071	1991 PE_{7}	—	August 6, 1991	La Silla	E. W. Elst	·	4.5 km	MPC · JPL
21072	1991 PU_{8}	—	August 5, 1991	Palomar	H. E. Holt	RAF	3.1 km	MPC · JPL
21073 Darksky	1991 RE	Darksky	September 4, 1991	Siding Spring	R. H. McNaught	(5)	3.8 km	MPC · JPL
21074 Rügen	1991 RA_{4}	Rügen	September 12, 1991	Tautenburg Observatory	F. Börngen, L. D. Schmadel	·	4.3 km	MPC · JPL
21075 Heussinger	1991 RF_{4}	Heussinger	September 12, 1991	Tautenburg Observatory	L. D. Schmadel, F. Börngen	(6769)	4.6 km	MPC · JPL
21076 Kokoschka	1991 RG_{4}	Kokoschka	September 12, 1991	Tautenburg Observatory	F. Börngen, L. D. Schmadel	NYS	3.0 km	MPC · JPL
21077	1991 RG_{14}	—	September 13, 1991	Palomar	H. E. Holt	EUN	4.0 km	MPC · JPL
21078	1991 RR_{16}	—	September 15, 1991	Palomar	H. E. Holt	CYB	15 km	MPC · JPL
21079	1991 RR_{17}	—	September 11, 1991	Palomar	H. E. Holt	GEF	5.8 km	MPC · JPL
21080	1991 RD_{18}	—	September 13, 1991	Palomar	H. E. Holt	·	7.4 km	MPC · JPL
21081	1991 RC_{19}	—	September 14, 1991	Palomar	H. E. Holt	(5)	4.4 km	MPC · JPL
21082 Araimasaru	1991 TG_{2}	Araimasaru	October 13, 1991	Okutama	Hioki, T., Hayakawa, S.	(5)	3.8 km	MPC · JPL
21083	1991 TH_{14}	—	October 2, 1991	Palomar	C. P. de Saint-Aignan	(5)	3.1 km	MPC · JPL
21084	1991 UV_{3}	—	October 31, 1991	Kushiro	S. Ueda, H. Kaneda	·	5.0 km	MPC · JPL
21085	1991 UL_{4}	—	October 18, 1991	Kushiro	S. Ueda, H. Kaneda	·	5.1 km	MPC · JPL
21086	1992 AO_{1}	—	January 10, 1992	Okutama	Hioki, T., Hayakawa, S.	·	3.8 km	MPC · JPL
21087 Petsimpallas	1992 BH_{2}	Petsimpallas	January 30, 1992	La Silla	E. W. Elst	EUN	5.5 km	MPC · JPL
21088 Chelyabinsk	1992 BL_{2}	Chelyabinsk	January 30, 1992	La Silla	E. W. Elst	AMO +1km	2.8 km	MPC · JPL
21089 Mochizuki	1992 CQ	Mochizuki	February 8, 1992	Geisei	T. Seki	EUN	7.7 km	MPC · JPL
21090	1992 DZ_{6}	—	February 29, 1992	La Silla	UESAC	EUN	4.0 km	MPC · JPL
21091	1992 DK_{8}	—	February 29, 1992	La Silla	UESAC	·	3.8 km	MPC · JPL
21092	1992 EJ_{6}	—	March 1, 1992	La Silla	UESAC	·	5.6 km	MPC · JPL
21093	1992 EK_{6}	—	March 1, 1992	La Silla	UESAC	·	6.6 km	MPC · JPL
21094	1992 EP_{7}	—	March 1, 1992	La Silla	UESAC	·	3.8 km	MPC · JPL
21095	1992 EG_{11}	—	March 6, 1992	La Silla	UESAC	EUN	4.4 km	MPC · JPL
21096	1992 EZ_{11}	—	March 6, 1992	La Silla	UESAC	·	7.4 km	MPC · JPL
21097	1992 ER_{25}	—	March 8, 1992	La Silla	UESAC	·	4.5 km	MPC · JPL
21098	1992 EB_{27}	—	March 2, 1992	La Silla	UESAC	KOR	3.7 km	MPC · JPL
21099	1992 GM_{2}	—	April 4, 1992	La Silla	E. W. Elst	·	2.9 km	MPC · JPL
21100	1992 OB	—	July 26, 1992	Siding Spring	R. H. McNaught	TIR	7.0 km	MPC · JPL

== 21101–21200 ==
back to top

Designation			Discovery			Properties		Ref
Permanent	Provisional	Named after	Date	Site	Discoverer(s)	Category	Diam.	Ref
21101	1992 OJ_{1}	—	July 26, 1992	La Silla	H. Debehogne	PHO	4.9 km	MPC · JPL
21102	1992 OF_{2}	—	July 26, 1992	La Silla	E. W. Elst	·	2.2 km	MPC · JPL
21103	1992 OB_{3}	—	July 26, 1992	La Silla	E. W. Elst	·	2.5 km	MPC · JPL
21104 Sveshnikov	1992 PY	Sveshnikov	August 8, 1992	Caussols	E. W. Elst	PHO	3.6 km	MPC · JPL
21105	1992 PU_{1}	—	August 8, 1992	Caussols	E. W. Elst	·	10 km	MPC · JPL
21106	1992 PO_{2}	—	August 2, 1992	Palomar	H. E. Holt	V	2.9 km	MPC · JPL
21107	1992 PZ_{4}	—	August 4, 1992	Palomar	H. E. Holt	EUN ·	7.1 km	MPC · JPL
21108	1992 QT	—	August 31, 1992	Palomar	E. F. Helin	PHO	6.7 km	MPC · JPL
21109 Sünkel	1992 RY	Sünkel	September 4, 1992	Tautenburg Observatory	L. D. Schmadel, F. Börngen	·	11 km	MPC · JPL
21110 Karlvalentin	1992 RC_{1}	Karlvalentin	September 4, 1992	Tautenburg Observatory	F. Börngen, L. D. Schmadel	NYS	1.9 km	MPC · JPL
21111	1992 RP_{3}	—	September 2, 1992	La Silla	E. W. Elst	PHO	4.3 km	MPC · JPL
21112	1992 RY_{3}	—	September 2, 1992	La Silla	E. W. Elst	·	2.2 km	MPC · JPL
21113	1992 RG_{4}	—	September 2, 1992	La Silla	E. W. Elst	·	2.8 km	MPC · JPL
21114 Bernson	1992 RS_{5}	Bernson	September 2, 1992	La Silla	E. W. Elst	·	1.9 km	MPC · JPL
21115	1992 RL_{7}	—	September 2, 1992	La Silla	E. W. Elst	·	3.5 km	MPC · JPL
21116	1992 SO	—	September 26, 1992	Dynic	A. Sugie	·	4.6 km	MPC · JPL
21117 Tashimaseizo	1992 SB_{13}	Tashimaseizo	September 30, 1992	Kitami	K. Endate, K. Watanabe	·	3.9 km	MPC · JPL
21118 Hezimmermann	1992 SB_{17}	Hezimmermann	September 24, 1992	Tautenburg Observatory	L. D. Schmadel, F. Börngen	NYS	2.9 km	MPC · JPL
21119	1992 UJ	—	October 19, 1992	Kushiro	S. Ueda, H. Kaneda	·	5.7 km	MPC · JPL
21120 Naritaatsushi	1992 WP	Naritaatsushi	November 16, 1992	Kitami	K. Endate, K. Watanabe	EUN	3.8 km	MPC · JPL
21121 Andoshoeki	1992 WV	Andoshoeki	November 16, 1992	Kitami	K. Endate, K. Watanabe	·	5.0 km	MPC · JPL
21122	1992 YK	—	December 23, 1992	Yakiimo	Natori, A., T. Urata	V	5.6 km	MPC · JPL
21123	1992 YP_{2}	—	December 18, 1992	Caussols	E. W. Elst	·	4.0 km	MPC · JPL
21124	1992 YR_{2}	—	December 18, 1992	Caussols	E. W. Elst	·	4.9 km	MPC · JPL
21125 Orff	1992 YZ_{4}	Orff	December 30, 1992	Tautenburg Observatory	F. Börngen	·	5.1 km	MPC · JPL
21126 Katsuyoshi	1993 BJ_{2}	Katsuyoshi	January 19, 1993	Geisei	T. Seki	·	8.4 km	MPC · JPL
21127	1993 BF_{4}	—	January 27, 1993	Caussols	E. W. Elst	EUN	4.2 km	MPC · JPL
21128 Chapuis	1993 BJ_{5}	Chapuis	January 27, 1993	Caussols	E. W. Elst	HIL · 3:2	18 km	MPC · JPL
21129	1993 BJ_{7}	—	January 23, 1993	La Silla	E. W. Elst	MAR	5.1 km	MPC · JPL
21130	1993 FN	—	March 23, 1993	Lake Tekapo	A. C. Gilmore, P. M. Kilmartin	·	3.6 km	MPC · JPL
21131	1993 FQ_{7}	—	March 17, 1993	La Silla	UESAC	EOS	4.7 km	MPC · JPL
21132	1993 FN_{10}	—	March 17, 1993	La Silla	UESAC	KOR	5.0 km	MPC · JPL
21133	1993 FE_{11}	—	March 17, 1993	La Silla	UESAC	AGN · slow	3.2 km	MPC · JPL
21134	1993 FE_{13}	—	March 17, 1993	La Silla	UESAC	PAD	5.8 km	MPC · JPL
21135	1993 FL_{14}	—	March 17, 1993	La Silla	UESAC	·	3.6 km	MPC · JPL
21136	1993 FH_{19}	—	March 17, 1993	La Silla	UESAC	·	3.7 km	MPC · JPL
21137	1993 FX_{20}	—	March 21, 1993	La Silla	UESAC	KOR	4.2 km	MPC · JPL
21138	1993 FS_{24}	—	March 21, 1993	La Silla	UESAC	·	2.5 km	MPC · JPL
21139	1993 FP_{26}	—	March 21, 1993	La Silla	UESAC	·	3.6 km	MPC · JPL
21140	1993 FN_{28}	—	March 21, 1993	La Silla	UESAC	·	2.1 km	MPC · JPL
21141	1993 FD_{30}	—	March 21, 1993	La Silla	UESAC	·	4.8 km	MPC · JPL
21142	1993 FV_{30}	—	March 19, 1993	La Silla	UESAC	·	3.5 km	MPC · JPL
21143	1993 FX_{31}	—	March 19, 1993	La Silla	UESAC	·	6.2 km	MPC · JPL
21144	1993 FA_{46}	—	March 19, 1993	La Silla	UESAC	·	4.5 km	MPC · JPL
21145	1993 FZ_{57}	—	March 19, 1993	La Silla	UESAC	·	3.2 km	MPC · JPL
21146	1993 FD_{67}	—	March 21, 1993	La Silla	UESAC	·	5.9 km	MPC · JPL
21147	1993 FV_{80}	—	March 18, 1993	La Silla	UESAC	·	3.8 km	MPC · JPL
21148 Billramsey	1993 HN_{1}	Billramsey	April 16, 1993	Palomar	C. S. Shoemaker, E. M. Shoemaker	·	9.9 km	MPC · JPL
21149 Kenmitchell	1993 HY_{5}	Kenmitchell	April 19, 1993	Palomar	C. S. Shoemaker, E. M. Shoemaker	H	2.2 km	MPC · JPL
21150	1993 LF_{1}	—	June 13, 1993	Siding Spring	R. H. McNaught	EUN	5.2 km	MPC · JPL
21151	1993 LO_{1}	—	June 13, 1993	Siding Spring	R. H. McNaught	·	3.9 km	MPC · JPL
21152	1993 MB_{1}	—	June 17, 1993	Palomar	H. E. Holt	EUN	6.3 km	MPC · JPL
21153	1993 MF_{1}	—	June 18, 1993	Siding Spring	R. H. McNaught	EUN	6.0 km	MPC · JPL
21154	1993 NS_{1}	—	July 12, 1993	La Silla	E. W. Elst	·	5.4 km	MPC · JPL
21155	1993 NW_{1}	—	July 12, 1993	La Silla	E. W. Elst	KOR	3.9 km	MPC · JPL
21156 Didierlockwood	1993 QP_{7}	Didierlockwood	August 20, 1993	La Silla	E. W. Elst	·	3.0 km	MPC · JPL
21157	1993 RC_{5}	—	September 15, 1993	La Silla	E. W. Elst	·	8.9 km	MPC · JPL
21158	1993 RP_{18}	—	September 15, 1993	La Silla	H. Debehogne, E. W. Elst	·	2.1 km	MPC · JPL
21159	1993 ST_{5}	—	September 17, 1993	La Silla	E. W. Elst	·	2.5 km	MPC · JPL
21160 Saveriolombardi	1993 TJ	Saveriolombardi	October 10, 1993	Stroncone	A. Vagnozzi	EOS	8.6 km	MPC · JPL
21161 Yamashitaharuo	1993 TR_{1}	Yamashitaharuo	October 15, 1993	Kitami	K. Endate, K. Watanabe	·	19 km	MPC · JPL
21162	1993 TW_{16}	—	October 9, 1993	La Silla	E. W. Elst	·	6.4 km	MPC · JPL
21163	1993 TJ_{24}	—	October 9, 1993	La Silla	E. W. Elst	·	2.1 km	MPC · JPL
21164	1993 UZ_{7}	—	October 20, 1993	La Silla	E. W. Elst	(1298)	17 km	MPC · JPL
21165	1993 VF_{2}	—	November 11, 1993	Kushiro	S. Ueda, H. Kaneda	·	2.6 km	MPC · JPL
21166 Nobuyukishouji	1993 XH	Nobuyukishouji	December 6, 1993	Geisei	T. Seki	·	2.2 km	MPC · JPL
21167	1993 XQ	—	December 9, 1993	Oizumi	T. Kobayashi	KOR	4.7 km	MPC · JPL
21168	1994 AC_{8}	—	January 7, 1994	Kitt Peak	Spacewatch	·	2.5 km	MPC · JPL
21169	1994 AG_{10}	—	January 8, 1994	Kitt Peak	Spacewatch	NYS	1.9 km	MPC · JPL
21170	1994 AL_{10}	—	January 8, 1994	Kitt Peak	Spacewatch	·	2.3 km	MPC · JPL
21171	1994 CG_{1}	—	February 7, 1994	Oizumi	T. Kobayashi	·	2.9 km	MPC · JPL
21172	1994 CK_{10}	—	February 7, 1994	La Silla	E. W. Elst	·	2.6 km	MPC · JPL
21173	1994 CU_{10}	—	February 7, 1994	La Silla	E. W. Elst	·	5.7 km	MPC · JPL
21174	1994 CG_{12}	—	February 7, 1994	La Silla	E. W. Elst	NYS ·	7.3 km	MPC · JPL
21175	1994 CP_{12}	—	February 7, 1994	La Silla	E. W. Elst	·	4.2 km	MPC · JPL
21176	1994 CN_{13}	—	February 8, 1994	La Silla	E. W. Elst	NYS ·	7.7 km	MPC · JPL
21177	1994 CC_{17}	—	February 8, 1994	La Silla	E. W. Elst	NYS	2.7 km	MPC · JPL
21178	1994 CJ_{17}	—	February 8, 1994	La Silla	E. W. Elst	V	2.8 km	MPC · JPL
21179	1994 CL_{18}	—	February 8, 1994	La Silla	E. W. Elst	·	5.4 km	MPC · JPL
21180	1994 DC	—	February 16, 1994	Oizumi	T. Kobayashi	·	3.2 km	MPC · JPL
21181	1994 EB_{2}	—	March 6, 1994	Palomar	E. F. Helin	PHO	4.4 km	MPC · JPL
21182 Teshiogawa	1994 EC_{2}	Teshiogawa	March 12, 1994	Kitami	K. Endate, K. Watanabe	PHO	4.2 km	MPC · JPL
21183	1994 EO_{2}	—	March 9, 1994	Palomar	E. F. Helin	·	4.2 km	MPC · JPL
21184	1994 EC_{5}	—	March 6, 1994	Kitt Peak	Spacewatch	·	2.5 km	MPC · JPL
21185	1994 EH_{6}	—	March 9, 1994	Caussols	E. W. Elst	·	2.6 km	MPC · JPL
21186	1994 EO_{6}	—	March 9, 1994	Caussols	E. W. Elst	·	2.8 km	MPC · JPL
21187 Setsuo	1994 FY	Setsuo	March 31, 1994	Kitami	K. Endate, K. Watanabe	PHO	4.3 km	MPC · JPL
21188 Kiyohiro	1994 GN	Kiyohiro	April 5, 1994	Kitami	K. Endate, K. Watanabe	(1338) (FLO)	3.8 km	MPC · JPL
21189 Robertonesci	1994 JB	Robertonesci	May 3, 1994	Stroncone	A. Vagnozzi	·	2.7 km	MPC · JPL
21190 Martamaffei	1994 JQ	Martamaffei	May 10, 1994	Stroncone	A. Vagnozzi	·	2.6 km	MPC · JPL
21191	1994 JL_{6}	—	May 4, 1994	Kitt Peak	Spacewatch	·	2.4 km	MPC · JPL
21192 Seccisergio	1994 NA	Seccisergio	July 2, 1994	Stroncone	Santa Lucia	V	2.3 km	MPC · JPL
21193	1994 PJ_{1}	—	August 14, 1994	Siding Spring	R. H. McNaught	·	3.4 km	MPC · JPL
21194	1994 PN_{1}	—	August 11, 1994	Siding Spring	R. H. McNaught	·	14 km	MPC · JPL
21195	1994 PK_{4}	—	August 10, 1994	La Silla	E. W. Elst	AEO	6.5 km	MPC · JPL
21196	1994 PU_{5}	—	August 10, 1994	La Silla	E. W. Elst	EOS	3.6 km	MPC · JPL
21197	1994 PS_{7}	—	August 10, 1994	La Silla	E. W. Elst	·	4.0 km	MPC · JPL
21198	1994 PX_{7}	—	August 10, 1994	La Silla	E. W. Elst	·	4.8 km	MPC · JPL
21199	1994 PV_{8}	—	August 10, 1994	La Silla	E. W. Elst	·	2.1 km	MPC · JPL
21200	1994 PU_{10}	—	August 10, 1994	La Silla	E. W. Elst	·	3.0 km	MPC · JPL

== 21201–21300 ==
back to top

Designation			Discovery			Properties		Ref
Permanent	Provisional	Named after	Date	Site	Discoverer(s)	Category	Diam.	Ref
21201	1994 PO_{18}	—	August 12, 1994	La Silla	E. W. Elst	KOR	4.2 km	MPC · JPL
21202	1994 PW_{19}	—	August 12, 1994	La Silla	E. W. Elst	·	6.9 km	MPC · JPL
21203	1994 PP_{20}	—	August 12, 1994	La Silla	E. W. Elst	·	6.1 km	MPC · JPL
21204	1994 PH_{26}	—	August 12, 1994	La Silla	E. W. Elst	KOR	5.3 km	MPC · JPL
21205	1994 PV_{27}	—	August 12, 1994	La Silla	E. W. Elst	·	4.3 km	MPC · JPL
21206	1994 PT_{28}	—	August 12, 1994	La Silla	E. W. Elst	slow	11 km	MPC · JPL
21207	1994 PH_{29}	—	August 12, 1994	La Silla	E. W. Elst	slow	4.8 km	MPC · JPL
21208	1994 PW_{29}	—	August 12, 1994	La Silla	E. W. Elst	·	6.5 km	MPC · JPL
21209	1994 PO_{30}	—	August 12, 1994	La Silla	E. W. Elst	·	6.5 km	MPC · JPL
21210	1994 PA_{31}	—	August 12, 1994	La Silla	E. W. Elst	·	8.8 km	MPC · JPL
21211	1994 PP_{36}	—	August 10, 1994	La Silla	E. W. Elst	EOS	5.0 km	MPC · JPL
21212	1994 PG_{39}	—	August 10, 1994	La Silla	E. W. Elst	THM	5.7 km	MPC · JPL
21213	1994 RL_{7}	—	September 12, 1994	Kitt Peak	Spacewatch	·	3.2 km	MPC · JPL
21214	1994 RN_{7}	—	September 12, 1994	Kitt Peak	Spacewatch	AGN	3.4 km	MPC · JPL
21215	1994 UQ	—	October 31, 1994	Oizumi	T. Kobayashi	EUN	6.5 km	MPC · JPL
21216	1994 UZ_{1}	—	October 31, 1994	Kushiro	S. Ueda, H. Kaneda	·	8.3 km	MPC · JPL
21217	1994 VM_{1}	—	November 4, 1994	Oizumi	T. Kobayashi	·	9.7 km	MPC · JPL
21218	1994 VP_{7}	—	November 7, 1994	Kushiro	S. Ueda, H. Kaneda	·	7.3 km	MPC · JPL
21219 Mascagni	1994 WV_{1}	Mascagni	November 28, 1994	Colleverde	V. S. Casulli	THM	9.4 km	MPC · JPL
21220	1994 WE_{4}	—	November 30, 1994	Oizumi	T. Kobayashi	EOS	8.0 km	MPC · JPL
21221	1994 YM_{1}	—	December 31, 1994	Oizumi	T. Kobayashi	EOS	7.9 km	MPC · JPL
21222	1995 BT	—	January 23, 1995	Oizumi	T. Kobayashi	·	12 km	MPC · JPL
21223	1995 DL	—	February 21, 1995	Oizumi	T. Kobayashi	HYG	10 km	MPC · JPL
21224	1995 DM_{6}	—	February 24, 1995	Kitt Peak	Spacewatch	·	20 km	MPC · JPL
21225	1995 GQ_{1}	—	April 1, 1995	Kitt Peak	Spacewatch	·	2.5 km	MPC · JPL
21226	1995 ON_{6}	—	July 24, 1995	Kitt Peak	Spacewatch	·	2.0 km	MPC · JPL
21227	1995 QS	—	August 16, 1995	Nachi-Katsuura	Y. Shimizu, T. Urata	·	3.8 km	MPC · JPL
21228	1995 SC	—	September 20, 1995	Catalina Station	T. B. Spahr	·	4.4 km	MPC · JPL
21229 Sušil	1995 SM_{1}	Sušil	September 22, 1995	Ondřejov	L. Kotková	·	3.9 km	MPC · JPL
21230	1995 SK_{3}	—	September 23, 1995	Loiano	Loiano	NYS	3.0 km	MPC · JPL
21231	1995 SC_{17}	—	September 18, 1995	Kitt Peak	Spacewatch	·	5.6 km	MPC · JPL
21232	1995 SH_{26}	—	September 19, 1995	Kitt Peak	Spacewatch	·	2.4 km	MPC · JPL
21233	1995 UU_{3}	—	October 20, 1995	Oizumi	T. Kobayashi	LEO	7.0 km	MPC · JPL
21234 Nakashima	1995 WG	Nakashima	November 16, 1995	Oizumi	T. Kobayashi	EUN	4.1 km	MPC · JPL
21235	1995 WG_{2}	—	November 18, 1995	Oizumi	T. Kobayashi	·	6.5 km	MPC · JPL
21236 Moneta	1995 WE_{3}	Moneta	November 20, 1995	Farra d'Isonzo	Farra d'Isonzo	·	2.9 km	MPC · JPL
21237 Suematsu	1995 WF_{5}	Suematsu	November 18, 1995	Kitami	K. Endate, K. Watanabe	·	4.8 km	MPC · JPL
21238 Panarea	1995 WV_{7}	Panarea	November 28, 1995	Oizumi	T. Kobayashi	·	5.2 km	MPC · JPL
21239	1995 WP_{17}	—	November 17, 1995	Kitt Peak	Spacewatch	·	3.5 km	MPC · JPL
21240	1995 WP_{22}	—	November 18, 1995	Kitt Peak	Spacewatch	NYS	2.2 km	MPC · JPL
21241	1995 WN_{33}	—	November 20, 1995	Kitt Peak	Spacewatch	EUN	4.0 km	MPC · JPL
21242	1995 WZ_{41}	—	November 25, 1995	Kushiro	S. Ueda, H. Kaneda	·	7.0 km	MPC · JPL
21243	1995 XG_{1}	—	December 15, 1995	Oizumi	T. Kobayashi	·	4.3 km	MPC · JPL
21244	1995 XU_{1}	—	December 14, 1995	Haleakala	AMOS	NYS	3.1 km	MPC · JPL
21245	1995 XQ_{4}	—	December 14, 1995	Kitt Peak	Spacewatch	HOF	6.1 km	MPC · JPL
21246	1995 YF_{1}	—	December 21, 1995	Oizumi	T. Kobayashi	GEF	6.6 km	MPC · JPL
21247	1995 YJ_{1}	—	December 21, 1995	Oizumi	T. Kobayashi	KOR	4.8 km	MPC · JPL
21248	1995 YP_{1}	—	December 21, 1995	Oizumi	T. Kobayashi	·	6.3 km	MPC · JPL
21249	1995 YX_{1}	—	December 21, 1995	Oizumi	T. Kobayashi	NYS	2.3 km	MPC · JPL
21250 Kamikouchi	1995 YQ_{2}	Kamikouchi	December 17, 1995	Chichibu	N. Satō	·	2.9 km	MPC · JPL
21251	1995 YX_{3}	—	December 31, 1995	Oohira	T. Urata	·	4.0 km	MPC · JPL
21252	1995 YP_{8}	—	December 18, 1995	Kitt Peak	Spacewatch	·	11 km	MPC · JPL
21253	1996 AX_{3}	—	January 13, 1996	Kushiro	S. Ueda, H. Kaneda	·	12 km	MPC · JPL
21254 Jonan	1996 BG_{2}	Jonan	January 24, 1996	KCAO	Kobayashi, J.	HNS	6.0 km	MPC · JPL
21255	1996 CD_{2}	—	February 15, 1996	Haleakala	NEAT	EUN	6.4 km	MPC · JPL
21256 Robertobattiston	1996 CK_{7}	Robertobattiston	February 14, 1996	Cima Ekar	M. Tombelli, C. Casacci	·	7.8 km	MPC · JPL
21257 Jižní Čechy	1996 DS_{2}	Jižní Čechy	February 26, 1996	Kleť	Kleť	NAE	8.3 km	MPC · JPL
21258 Huckins	1996 EH_{1}	Huckins	March 15, 1996	Haleakala	NEAT	·	10 km	MPC · JPL
21259	1996 ED_{4}	—	March 11, 1996	Kitt Peak	Spacewatch	·	7.2 km	MPC · JPL
21260	1996 FE	—	March 16, 1996	Haleakala	NEAT	H	1.6 km	MPC · JPL
21261	1996 FF	—	March 16, 1996	Haleakala	NEAT	H ·	2.7 km	MPC · JPL
21262 Kanba	1996 HA_{2}	Kanba	April 24, 1996	Yatsuka	R. H. McNaught, H. Abe	·	13 km	MPC · JPL
21263	1996 HJ_{11}	—	April 17, 1996	La Silla	E. W. Elst	·	2.6 km	MPC · JPL
21264	1996 HT_{16}	—	April 18, 1996	La Silla	E. W. Elst	·	5.9 km	MPC · JPL
21265	1996 HJ_{23}	—	April 20, 1996	La Silla	E. W. Elst	·	2.8 km	MPC · JPL
21266	1996 HL_{25}	—	April 20, 1996	La Silla	E. W. Elst	·	2.7 km	MPC · JPL
21267	1996 JU_{5}	—	May 11, 1996	Kitt Peak	Spacewatch	·	1.9 km	MPC · JPL
21268	1996 KL_{1}	—	May 22, 1996	Catalina Station	T. B. Spahr	·	9.5 km	MPC · JPL
21269 Bechini	1996 LG	Bechini	June 6, 1996	San Marcello	L. Tesi, A. Boattini	·	3.3 km	MPC · JPL
21270 Otokar	1996 OK	Otokar	July 19, 1996	Kleť	J. Tichá, M. Tichý	·	2.0 km	MPC · JPL
21271	1996 RF_{33}	—	September 15, 1996	La Silla	Uppsala-DLR Trojan Survey	L4	21 km	MPC · JPL
21272 Suyi	1996 SA_{1}	Suyi	September 18, 1996	Xinglong	SCAP	·	2.6 km	MPC · JPL
21273	1996 SW_{2}	—	September 19, 1996	Kitt Peak	Spacewatch	·	2.1 km	MPC · JPL
21274	1996 SG_{4}	—	September 19, 1996	Xinglong	SCAP	(5)	3.2 km	MPC · JPL
21275 Tosiyasu	1996 SJ_{7}	Tosiyasu	September 23, 1996	Nanyo	T. Okuni	·	1.8 km	MPC · JPL
21276 Feller	1996 TF_{5}	Feller	October 8, 1996	Prescott	P. G. Comba	·	1.6 km	MPC · JPL
21277	1996 TO_{5}	—	October 9, 1996	Haleakala	NEAT	AMO +1km	2.1 km	MPC · JPL
21278	1996 TG_{6}	—	October 5, 1996	Xinglong	SCAP	·	3.3 km	MPC · JPL
21279	1996 TS_{10}	—	October 9, 1996	Kushiro	S. Ueda, H. Kaneda	·	2.8 km	MPC · JPL
21280	1996 TL_{11}	—	October 11, 1996	Kitami	K. Endate	·	2.2 km	MPC · JPL
21281	1996 TX_{14}	—	October 13, 1996	Church Stretton	S. P. Laurie	·	2.2 km	MPC · JPL
21282 Shimizuyuka	1996 TD_{15}	Shimizuyuka	October 14, 1996	Geisei	T. Seki	PHO	4.2 km	MPC · JPL
21283	1996 TY_{46}	—	October 10, 1996	Kitt Peak	Spacewatch	·	2.3 km	MPC · JPL
21284 Pandion	1996 TC_{51}	Pandion	October 5, 1996	La Silla	E. W. Elst	L4	29 km	MPC · JPL
21285	1996 UZ	—	October 20, 1996	Oizumi	T. Kobayashi	·	3.4 km	MPC · JPL
21286	1996 UB_{1}	—	October 20, 1996	Oizumi	T. Kobayashi	·	2.9 km	MPC · JPL
21287 Santa-Lucia	1996 UU_{3}	Santa-Lucia	October 31, 1996	Stroncone	A. Vagnozzi	·	1.6 km	MPC · JPL
21288	1996 VW	—	November 3, 1996	Oohira	T. Urata	·	2.3 km	MPC · JPL
21289 Giacomel	1996 VB_{1}	Giacomel	November 3, 1996	Sormano	F. Manca, Giuliani, V.	·	2.0 km	MPC · JPL
21290 Vydra	1996 VR_{1}	Vydra	November 9, 1996	Kleť	M. Tichý, Z. Moravec	·	4.2 km	MPC · JPL
21291 Mercalli	1996 VG_{6}	Mercalli	November 12, 1996	Campo Imperatore	A. Boattini, F. Pedichini	V	1.6 km	MPC · JPL
21292 Kanetakoichi	1996 VQ_{8}	Kanetakoichi	November 7, 1996	Kitami	K. Endate, K. Watanabe	·	4.3 km	MPC · JPL
21293 Fujimototoyoshi	1996 VS_{8}	Fujimototoyoshi	November 7, 1996	Kitami	K. Endate, K. Watanabe	·	3.6 km	MPC · JPL
21294 Yamaguchiyuko	1996 VZ_{8}	Yamaguchiyuko	November 7, 1996	Kitami	K. Endate, K. Watanabe	·	2.7 km	MPC · JPL
21295	1996 VN_{14}	—	November 5, 1996	Kitt Peak	Spacewatch	V	1.7 km	MPC · JPL
21296	1996 VV_{19}	—	November 7, 1996	Kitt Peak	Spacewatch	·	2.7 km	MPC · JPL
21297	1996 VW_{29}	—	November 7, 1996	Kushiro	S. Ueda, H. Kaneda	·	3.0 km	MPC · JPL
21298	1996 VX_{29}	—	November 7, 1996	Kushiro	S. Ueda, H. Kaneda	·	3.2 km	MPC · JPL
21299	1996 WC	—	November 16, 1996	Oizumi	T. Kobayashi	·	2.7 km	MPC · JPL
21300	1996 WA_{1}	—	November 19, 1996	Oizumi	T. Kobayashi	·	3.8 km	MPC · JPL

== 21301–21400 ==
back to top

Designation			Discovery			Properties		Ref
Permanent	Provisional	Named after	Date	Site	Discoverer(s)	Category	Diam.	Ref
21301 Zanin	1996 WE_{3}	Zanin	November 22, 1996	Farra d'Isonzo	Farra d'Isonzo	·	3.5 km	MPC · JPL
21302 Shirakamisanchi	1996 XU	Shirakamisanchi	December 1, 1996	Chichibu	N. Satō	·	2.3 km	MPC · JPL
21303	1996 XJ_{1}	—	December 2, 1996	Oizumi	T. Kobayashi	NYS	3.8 km	MPC · JPL
21304	1996 XL_{1}	—	December 2, 1996	Oizumi	T. Kobayashi	V	3.2 km	MPC · JPL
21305	1996 XP_{1}	—	December 2, 1996	Oizumi	T. Kobayashi	·	3.4 km	MPC · JPL
21306 Marani	1996 XF_{2}	Marani	December 1, 1996	Pianoro	V. Goretti	·	7.9 km	MPC · JPL
21307	1996 XG_{3}	—	December 3, 1996	Oizumi	T. Kobayashi	·	3.1 km	MPC · JPL
21308	1996 XG_{5}	—	December 2, 1996	Pleiade	P. Antolini, Castellani, F.	·	2.6 km	MPC · JPL
21309	1996 XH_{5}	—	December 6, 1996	Kiso	Japan Spaceguard Association	·	2.8 km	MPC · JPL
21310	1996 XM_{5}	—	December 7, 1996	Oizumi	T. Kobayashi	·	3.9 km	MPC · JPL
21311 Servius	1996 XC_{9}	Servius	December 4, 1996	Colleverde	V. S. Casulli	·	2.6 km	MPC · JPL
21312	1996 XF_{14}	—	December 4, 1996	Kitt Peak	Spacewatch	·	3.5 km	MPC · JPL
21313 Xiuyanyu	1996 XY_{14}	Xiuyanyu	December 10, 1996	Xinglong	SCAP	·	4.1 km	MPC · JPL
21314	1996 XG_{15}	—	December 10, 1996	Xinglong	SCAP	·	4.9 km	MPC · JPL
21315	1996 XN_{17}	—	December 5, 1996	Kitt Peak	Spacewatch	·	4.3 km	MPC · JPL
21316	1996 XY_{17}	—	December 7, 1996	Kitt Peak	Spacewatch	·	2.1 km	MPC · JPL
21317	1996 XV_{18}	—	December 12, 1996	Kleť	Kleť	·	2.7 km	MPC · JPL
21318	1996 XU_{26}	—	December 8, 1996	Xinglong	SCAP	·	3.3 km	MPC · JPL
21319	1996 XX_{26}	—	December 8, 1996	Xinglong	SCAP	·	8.7 km	MPC · JPL
21320	1996 XF_{31}	—	December 14, 1996	Oizumi	T. Kobayashi	·	6.4 km	MPC · JPL
21321	1997 AN_{2}	—	January 3, 1997	Oizumi	T. Kobayashi	V	2.7 km	MPC · JPL
21322	1997 AV_{2}	—	January 3, 1997	Oizumi	T. Kobayashi	·	5.9 km	MPC · JPL
21323	1997 AZ_{3}	—	January 6, 1997	Oizumi	T. Kobayashi	MAR	4.2 km	MPC · JPL
21324	1997 AY_{5}	—	January 2, 1997	Xinglong	SCAP	·	2.6 km	MPC · JPL
21325	1997 AB_{6}	—	January 2, 1997	Xinglong	SCAP	·	2.7 km	MPC · JPL
21326 Nitta-machi	1997 AW_{6}	Nitta-machi	January 8, 1997	Oizumi	T. Kobayashi	·	3.5 km	MPC · JPL
21327 Yabuzuka	1997 AJ_{13}	Yabuzuka	January 11, 1997	Oizumi	T. Kobayashi	·	2.5 km	MPC · JPL
21328 Otashi	1997 AM_{13}	Otashi	January 11, 1997	Oizumi	T. Kobayashi	V	2.7 km	MPC · JPL
21329	1997 AP_{15}	—	January 12, 1997	Haleakala	NEAT	·	3.6 km	MPC · JPL
21330 Alanwhitman	1997 AT_{20}	Alanwhitman	January 11, 1997	Kitt Peak	Spacewatch	·	3.4 km	MPC · JPL
21331 Lodovicoferrari	1997 BO	Lodovicoferrari	January 17, 1997	Prescott	P. G. Comba	·	2.8 km	MPC · JPL
21332	1997 BX	—	January 18, 1997	Xinglong	SCAP	NYS ·	5.8 km	MPC · JPL
21333	1997 BM_{2}	—	January 30, 1997	Oizumi	T. Kobayashi	PHO	3.2 km	MPC · JPL
21334	1997 BO_{2}	—	January 30, 1997	Oizumi	T. Kobayashi	·	3.2 km	MPC · JPL
21335	1997 BO_{3}	—	January 31, 1997	Oizumi	T. Kobayashi	·	5.7 km	MPC · JPL
21336 Andyblanchard	1997 BU_{8}	Andyblanchard	January 31, 1997	Kitt Peak	Spacewatch	·	2.7 km	MPC · JPL
21337 Sansepolcro	1997 BN_{9}	Sansepolcro	January 17, 1997	Campo Imperatore	A. Boattini, A. Di Paola	EOS	6.0 km	MPC · JPL
21338	1997 CZ	—	February 1, 1997	Oizumi	T. Kobayashi	·	3.8 km	MPC · JPL
21339	1997 CL_{1}	—	February 1, 1997	Oizumi	T. Kobayashi	NYS	3.5 km	MPC · JPL
21340	1997 CS_{19}	—	February 11, 1997	Oizumi	T. Kobayashi	·	5.0 km	MPC · JPL
21341	1997 CV_{19}	—	February 12, 1997	Oizumi	T. Kobayashi	V	3.3 km	MPC · JPL
21342	1997 CS_{28}	—	February 4, 1997	Xinglong	SCAP	·	3.4 km	MPC · JPL
21343	1997 EF	—	March 1, 1997	Oizumi	T. Kobayashi	·	3.5 km	MPC · JPL
21344	1997 EM	—	March 2, 1997	Oizumi	T. Kobayashi	(21344)	4.9 km	MPC · JPL
21345	1997 ED_{3}	—	March 3, 1997	Xinglong	SCAP	ADE	8.1 km	MPC · JPL
21346 Marieladislav	1997 EL_{11}	Marieladislav	March 9, 1997	Ondřejov	P. Pravec	MAR	6.3 km	MPC · JPL
21347	1997 EO_{11}	—	March 3, 1997	Xinglong	SCAP	EUN	3.8 km	MPC · JPL
21348 Toyoteru	1997 EM_{25}	Toyoteru	March 1, 1997	Chichibu	N. Satō	MAR	3.2 km	MPC · JPL
21349 Bevoke	1997 ER_{31}	Bevoke	March 10, 1997	Kitt Peak	Spacewatch	THM	6.7 km	MPC · JPL
21350 Billgardner	1997 EN_{32}	Billgardner	March 11, 1997	Kitt Peak	Spacewatch	·	3.2 km	MPC · JPL
21351 Bhagwat	1997 EC_{36}	Bhagwat	March 4, 1997	Socorro	LINEAR	EUN	4.4 km	MPC · JPL
21352	1997 EB_{57}	—	March 10, 1997	La Silla	E. W. Elst	KOR	5.1 km	MPC · JPL
21353	1997 FG	—	March 19, 1997	Xinglong	SCAP	·	13 km	MPC · JPL
21354	1997 FM	—	March 21, 1997	Xinglong	SCAP	EUN	3.8 km	MPC · JPL
21355 Pikovskaya	1997 FZ_{3}	Pikovskaya	March 31, 1997	Socorro	LINEAR	KOR	4.5 km	MPC · JPL
21356 Karlplank	1997 FG_{4}	Karlplank	March 31, 1997	Socorro	LINEAR	·	8.8 km	MPC · JPL
21357 Davidying	1997 FJ_{4}	Davidying	March 31, 1997	Socorro	LINEAR	KOR	3.3 km	MPC · JPL
21358 Mijerbarany	1997 GT_{15}	Mijerbarany	April 3, 1997	Socorro	LINEAR	·	3.2 km	MPC · JPL
21359 Geng	1997 GN_{22}	Geng	April 6, 1997	Socorro	LINEAR	KOR	3.9 km	MPC · JPL
21360 Bobduff	1997 GW_{30}	Bobduff	April 8, 1997	Kitt Peak	Spacewatch	THM	8.8 km	MPC · JPL
21361 Carsonmark	1997 HQ	Carsonmark	April 28, 1997	Kitt Peak	Spacewatch	·	6.4 km	MPC · JPL
21362 Dickarmstrong	1997 HS_{3}	Dickarmstrong	April 30, 1997	Kitt Peak	Spacewatch	·	4.1 km	MPC · JPL
21363 Jotwani	1997 HX_{11}	Jotwani	April 30, 1997	Socorro	LINEAR	·	4.3 km	MPC · JPL
21364 Lingpan	1997 HS_{12}	Lingpan	April 30, 1997	Socorro	LINEAR	·	7.1 km	MPC · JPL
21365	1997 JS_{7}	—	May 3, 1997	Xinglong	SCAP	EUN	4.1 km	MPC · JPL
21366	1997 JT_{15}	—	May 3, 1997	La Silla	E. W. Elst	KOR	7.4 km	MPC · JPL
21367 Edwardpleva	1997 LU_{1}	Edwardpleva	June 2, 1997	Kitt Peak	Spacewatch	·	8.4 km	MPC · JPL
21368 Shiodayama	1997 LE_{10}	Shiodayama	June 6, 1997	Nanyo	T. Okuni	EOS	9.1 km	MPC · JPL
21369 Gertfinger	1997 NO_{4}	Gertfinger	July 8, 1997	Caussols	ODAS	EOS · slow?	6.6 km	MPC · JPL
21370	1997 TB_{28}	—	October 1, 1997	La Silla	Uppsala-DLR Trojan Survey	L4	29 km	MPC · JPL
21371	1997 TD_{28}	—	October 1, 1997	La Silla	Uppsala-DLR Trojan Survey	L4	20 km	MPC · JPL
21372	1997 TM_{28}	—	October 6, 1997	La Silla	Uppsala-DLR Trojan Survey	L4	20 km	MPC · JPL
21373	1997 VF_{6}	—	November 9, 1997	Oizumi	T. Kobayashi	·	7.8 km	MPC · JPL
21374	1997 WS_{22}	—	November 24, 1997	Siding Spring	M. Hartley	AMO +1km	1.1 km	MPC · JPL
21375 Fanshawe	1997 YZ_{17}	Fanshawe	December 31, 1997	Kitt Peak	Spacewatch	·	2.0 km	MPC · JPL
21376	1998 BP_{8}	—	January 25, 1998	Oizumi	T. Kobayashi	·	3.4 km	MPC · JPL
21377	1998 CO_{1}	—	February 6, 1998	Xinglong	SCAP	·	3.1 km	MPC · JPL
21378	1998 CJ_{4}	—	February 6, 1998	La Silla	E. W. Elst	·	11 km	MPC · JPL
21379	1998 DU_{13}	—	February 27, 1998	Caussols	ODAS	V	1.3 km	MPC · JPL
21380 Devanssay	1998 DB_{20}	Devanssay	February 27, 1998	Caussols	ODAS	·	3.3 km	MPC · JPL
21381	1998 EN	—	March 2, 1998	Caussols	ODAS	·	2.2 km	MPC · JPL
21382	1998 EB_{8}	—	March 2, 1998	Xinglong	SCAP	·	1.8 km	MPC · JPL
21383	1998 EC_{9}	—	March 2, 1998	Xinglong	SCAP	·	3.1 km	MPC · JPL
21384	1998 EB_{10}	—	March 1, 1998	Xinglong	SCAP	·	3.0 km	MPC · JPL
21385	1998 FV_{8}	—	March 22, 1998	Kitt Peak	Spacewatch	MAS	1.9 km	MPC · JPL
21386	1998 FC_{9}	—	March 22, 1998	Kitt Peak	Spacewatch	·	2.7 km	MPC · JPL
21387 Wafakhalil	1998 FW_{16}	Wafakhalil	March 20, 1998	Socorro	LINEAR	·	2.5 km	MPC · JPL
21388 Moyanodeburt	1998 FJ_{25}	Moyanodeburt	March 20, 1998	Socorro	LINEAR	·	2.0 km	MPC · JPL
21389 Pshenichka	1998 FX_{27}	Pshenichka	March 20, 1998	Socorro	LINEAR	·	1.9 km	MPC · JPL
21390 Shindo	1998 FV_{28}	Shindo	March 20, 1998	Socorro	LINEAR	·	3.3 km	MPC · JPL
21391 Rotanner	1998 FY_{31}	Rotanner	March 20, 1998	Socorro	LINEAR	·	2.2 km	MPC · JPL
21392 Helibrochier	1998 FH_{32}	Helibrochier	March 20, 1998	Socorro	LINEAR	V	2.1 km	MPC · JPL
21393 Kalygeringer	1998 FF_{34}	Kalygeringer	March 20, 1998	Socorro	LINEAR	NYS	3.8 km	MPC · JPL
21394 Justinbecker	1998 FY_{35}	Justinbecker	March 20, 1998	Socorro	LINEAR	·	2.9 km	MPC · JPL
21395 Albertofilho	1998 FJ_{41}	Albertofilho	March 20, 1998	Socorro	LINEAR	·	3.4 km	MPC · JPL
21396 Fisher-Ives	1998 FC_{52}	Fisher-Ives	March 20, 1998	Socorro	LINEAR	NYS	3.1 km	MPC · JPL
21397 Leontovich	1998 FJ_{54}	Leontovich	March 20, 1998	Socorro	LINEAR	V	2.1 km	MPC · JPL
21398 Zengguoshou	1998 FX_{55}	Zengguoshou	March 20, 1998	Socorro	LINEAR	·	3.6 km	MPC · JPL
21399 Bateman	1998 FG_{57}	Bateman	March 20, 1998	Socorro	LINEAR	·	2.4 km	MPC · JPL
21400 Ahdout	1998 FM_{57}	Ahdout	March 20, 1998	Socorro	LINEAR	·	2.6 km	MPC · JPL

== 21401–21500 ==
back to top

Designation			Discovery			Properties		Ref
Permanent	Provisional	Named after	Date	Site	Discoverer(s)	Category	Diam.	Ref
21401 Justinkovac	1998 FC_{58}	Justinkovac	March 20, 1998	Socorro	LINEAR	NYS	2.2 km	MPC · JPL
21402 Shanhuang	1998 FE_{58}	Shanhuang	March 20, 1998	Socorro	LINEAR	·	1.8 km	MPC · JPL
21403 Haken	1998 FN_{58}	Haken	March 20, 1998	Socorro	LINEAR	·	5.4 km	MPC · JPL
21404 Atluri	1998 FD_{61}	Atluri	March 20, 1998	Socorro	LINEAR	·	3.5 km	MPC · JPL
21405 Sagarmehta	1998 FU_{61}	Sagarmehta	March 20, 1998	Socorro	LINEAR	·	1.8 km	MPC · JPL
21406 Jimyang	1998 FZ_{63}	Jimyang	March 20, 1998	Socorro	LINEAR	V	2.9 km	MPC · JPL
21407 Jessicabaker	1998 FL_{64}	Jessicabaker	March 20, 1998	Socorro	LINEAR	·	4.8 km	MPC · JPL
21408 Lyrahaas	1998 FZ_{64}	Lyrahaas	March 20, 1998	Socorro	LINEAR	·	4.0 km	MPC · JPL
21409 Forbes	1998 FC_{65}	Forbes	March 20, 1998	Socorro	LINEAR	·	2.4 km	MPC · JPL
21410 Cahill	1998 FH_{65}	Cahill	March 20, 1998	Socorro	LINEAR	·	4.7 km	MPC · JPL
21411 Abifraeman	1998 FY_{66}	Abifraeman	March 20, 1998	Socorro	LINEAR	·	4.8 km	MPC · JPL
21412 Sinchanban	1998 FJ_{67}	Sinchanban	March 20, 1998	Socorro	LINEAR	·	2.4 km	MPC · JPL
21413 Albertsao	1998 FS_{68}	Albertsao	March 20, 1998	Socorro	LINEAR	·	3.3 km	MPC · JPL
21414 Blumenthal	1998 FQ_{69}	Blumenthal	March 20, 1998	Socorro	LINEAR	·	3.3 km	MPC · JPL
21415 Nicobrenner	1998 FM_{70}	Nicobrenner	March 20, 1998	Socorro	LINEAR	NYS	3.6 km	MPC · JPL
21416 Sisichen	1998 FN_{70}	Sisichen	March 20, 1998	Socorro	LINEAR	V	2.4 km	MPC · JPL
21417 Kelleyharris	1998 FF_{71}	Kelleyharris	March 20, 1998	Socorro	LINEAR	·	1.9 km	MPC · JPL
21418 Bustos	1998 FY_{71}	Bustos	March 20, 1998	Socorro	LINEAR	·	2.7 km	MPC · JPL
21419 Devience	1998 FP_{72}	Devience	March 20, 1998	Socorro	LINEAR	·	2.1 km	MPC · JPL
21420 Steinicke	1998 FL_{74}	Steinicke	March 21, 1998	Bergisch Gladbach	W. Bickel	·	2.2 km	MPC · JPL
21421 Nealwadhwa	1998 FJ_{78}	Nealwadhwa	March 24, 1998	Socorro	LINEAR	·	2.9 km	MPC · JPL
21422 Alexacarey	1998 FL_{78}	Alexacarey	March 24, 1998	Socorro	LINEAR	·	4.7 km	MPC · JPL
21423 Credo	1998 FJ_{79}	Credo	March 24, 1998	Socorro	LINEAR	·	2.3 km	MPC · JPL
21424 Faithchang	1998 FU_{79}	Faithchang	March 24, 1998	Socorro	LINEAR	·	2.1 km	MPC · JPL
21425 Cordwell	1998 FR_{90}	Cordwell	March 24, 1998	Socorro	LINEAR	·	3.1 km	MPC · JPL
21426 Davidbauer	1998 FP_{93}	Davidbauer	March 24, 1998	Socorro	LINEAR	·	2.9 km	MPC · JPL
21427 Ryanharrison	1998 FK_{97}	Ryanharrison	March 31, 1998	Socorro	LINEAR	·	2.8 km	MPC · JPL
21428 Junehokim	1998 FR_{103}	Junehokim	March 31, 1998	Socorro	LINEAR	·	2.3 km	MPC · JPL
21429 Gulati	1998 FG_{104}	Gulati	March 31, 1998	Socorro	LINEAR	·	2.6 km	MPC · JPL
21430 Brubrew	1998 FG_{107}	Brubrew	March 31, 1998	Socorro	LINEAR	V	1.9 km	MPC · JPL
21431 Amberhess	1998 FR_{113}	Amberhess	March 31, 1998	Socorro	LINEAR	·	2.4 km	MPC · JPL
21432 Polingloh	1998 FJ_{115}	Polingloh	March 31, 1998	Socorro	LINEAR	slow	1.9 km	MPC · JPL
21433 Stekramer	1998 FO_{115}	Stekramer	March 31, 1998	Socorro	LINEAR	·	2.5 km	MPC · JPL
21434 Stanchiang	1998 FG_{116}	Stanchiang	March 31, 1998	Socorro	LINEAR	·	3.0 km	MPC · JPL
21435 Aharon	1998 FH_{116}	Aharon	March 31, 1998	Socorro	LINEAR	·	2.5 km	MPC · JPL
21436 Chaoyichi	1998 FL_{116}	Chaoyichi	March 31, 1998	Socorro	LINEAR	moon	2.0 km	MPC · JPL
21437 Georgechen	1998 FG_{117}	Georgechen	March 31, 1998	Socorro	LINEAR	EUN	5.1 km	MPC · JPL
21438 Camibarnett	1998 FP_{122}	Camibarnett	March 20, 1998	Socorro	LINEAR	·	4.3 km	MPC · JPL
21439 Robenzing	1998 FN_{123}	Robenzing	March 20, 1998	Socorro	LINEAR	·	2.2 km	MPC · JPL
21440 Elizacollins	1998 FB_{125}	Elizacollins	March 24, 1998	Socorro	LINEAR	·	2.1 km	MPC · JPL
21441 Stevencondie	1998 FC_{144}	Stevencondie	March 29, 1998	Socorro	LINEAR	·	3.6 km	MPC · JPL
21442	1998 GF_{1}	—	April 4, 1998	Woomera	F. B. Zoltowski	·	2.1 km	MPC · JPL
21443	1998 HN_{8}	—	April 17, 1998	Kitt Peak	Spacewatch	·	5.7 km	MPC · JPL
21444	1998 HT_{8}	—	April 17, 1998	Kitt Peak	Spacewatch	V	2.8 km	MPC · JPL
21445 Pegconnolly	1998 HG_{17}	Pegconnolly	April 18, 1998	Socorro	LINEAR	·	3.1 km	MPC · JPL
21446 Tedflint	1998 HV_{18}	Tedflint	April 18, 1998	Socorro	LINEAR	·	2.8 km	MPC · JPL
21447 Yungchieh	1998 HZ_{18}	Yungchieh	April 18, 1998	Socorro	LINEAR	NYS	2.3 km	MPC · JPL
21448 Galindo	1998 HE_{21}	Galindo	April 20, 1998	Socorro	LINEAR	·	2.1 km	MPC · JPL
21449 Hemmick	1998 HQ_{22}	Hemmick	April 20, 1998	Socorro	LINEAR	·	1.9 km	MPC · JPL
21450 Kissel	1998 HD_{23}	Kissel	April 20, 1998	Socorro	LINEAR	·	2.8 km	MPC · JPL
21451 Fisher	1998 HS_{23}	Fisher	April 28, 1998	Prescott	P. G. Comba	·	2.6 km	MPC · JPL
21452	1998 HA_{29}	—	April 23, 1998	Haleakala	NEAT	PHO	5.9 km	MPC · JPL
21453 Victorlevine	1998 HA_{33}	Victorlevine	April 20, 1998	Socorro	LINEAR	·	3.5 km	MPC · JPL
21454 Chernoby	1998 HE_{40}	Chernoby	April 20, 1998	Socorro	LINEAR	VER	13 km	MPC · JPL
21455 Mcfarland	1998 HH_{41}	Mcfarland	April 20, 1998	Socorro	LINEAR	(5)	3.4 km	MPC · JPL
21456 Myers	1998 HM_{46}	Myers	April 20, 1998	Socorro	LINEAR	·	2.0 km	MPC · JPL
21457 Fevig	1998 HD_{51}	Fevig	April 25, 1998	Anderson Mesa	LONEOS	·	2.9 km	MPC · JPL
21458 Susank	1998 HN_{51}	Susank	April 25, 1998	Anderson Mesa	LONEOS	·	3.2 km	MPC · JPL
21459 Chrisrussell	1998 HS_{51}	Chrisrussell	April 30, 1998	Anderson Mesa	LONEOS	fast	3.5 km	MPC · JPL
21460 Ryozo	1998 HP_{52}	Ryozo	April 30, 1998	Nanyo	T. Okuni	·	2.6 km	MPC · JPL
21461 Alexchernyak	1998 HS_{60}	Alexchernyak	April 21, 1998	Socorro	LINEAR	·	3.8 km	MPC · JPL
21462 Karenedbal	1998 HC_{78}	Karenedbal	April 21, 1998	Socorro	LINEAR	·	6.5 km	MPC · JPL
21463 Nickerson	1998 HX_{78}	Nickerson	April 21, 1998	Socorro	LINEAR	·	2.6 km	MPC · JPL
21464 Chinaroonchai	1998 HH_{88}	Chinaroonchai	April 21, 1998	Socorro	LINEAR	·	2.8 km	MPC · JPL
21465 Michelepatt	1998 HG_{90}	Michelepatt	April 21, 1998	Socorro	LINEAR	(2076)	2.0 km	MPC · JPL
21466 Franpelrine	1998 HZ_{91}	Franpelrine	April 21, 1998	Socorro	LINEAR	NYS	4.0 km	MPC · JPL
21467 Rosenstein	1998 HX_{93}	Rosenstein	April 21, 1998	Socorro	LINEAR	·	2.1 km	MPC · JPL
21468 Saylor	1998 HD_{97}	Saylor	April 21, 1998	Socorro	LINEAR	·	3.9 km	MPC · JPL
21469 Robschum	1998 HO_{97}	Robschum	April 21, 1998	Socorro	LINEAR	NYS	2.6 km	MPC · JPL
21470 Frankchuang	1998 HV_{97}	Frankchuang	April 21, 1998	Socorro	LINEAR	·	5.0 km	MPC · JPL
21471 Pavelchvykov	1998 HA_{98}	Pavelchvykov	April 21, 1998	Socorro	LINEAR	ADE	8.1 km	MPC · JPL
21472 Stimson	1998 HU_{98}	Stimson	April 21, 1998	Socorro	LINEAR	·	2.5 km	MPC · JPL
21473 Petesullivan	1998 HH_{99}	Petesullivan	April 21, 1998	Socorro	LINEAR	·	3.0 km	MPC · JPL
21474 Pamelatsai	1998 HO_{99}	Pamelatsai	April 21, 1998	Socorro	LINEAR	V	1.5 km	MPC · JPL
21475 Jasonclain	1998 HQ_{100}	Jasonclain	April 21, 1998	Socorro	LINEAR	·	4.1 km	MPC · JPL
21476 Petrie	1998 HW_{101}	Petrie	April 28, 1998	Reedy Creek	J. Broughton	·	3.9 km	MPC · JPL
21477 Terikdaly	1998 HX_{112}	Terikdaly	April 23, 1998	Socorro	LINEAR	·	3.1 km	MPC · JPL
21478 Maggiedelano	1998 HW_{118}	Maggiedelano	April 23, 1998	Socorro	LINEAR	·	5.7 km	MPC · JPL
21479 Marymartha	1998 HN_{124}	Marymartha	April 23, 1998	Socorro	LINEAR	·	3.7 km	MPC · JPL
21480 Jilltucker	1998 HO_{125}	Jilltucker	April 23, 1998	Socorro	LINEAR	V	1.9 km	MPC · JPL
21481 Johnwarren	1998 HP_{125}	Johnwarren	April 23, 1998	Socorro	LINEAR	slow	2.6 km	MPC · JPL
21482 Patashnick	1998 HQ_{132}	Patashnick	April 19, 1998	Socorro	LINEAR	NYS	4.9 km	MPC · JPL
21483 Abdulrasool	1998 HJ_{134}	Abdulrasool	April 19, 1998	Socorro	LINEAR	(2076)	2.8 km	MPC · JPL
21484 Eppard	1998 HR_{134}	Eppard	April 19, 1998	Socorro	LINEAR	V	2.9 km	MPC · JPL
21485 Ash	1998 HV_{137}	Ash	April 20, 1998	Socorro	LINEAR	V	2.2 km	MPC · JPL
21486	1998 HA_{148}	—	April 25, 1998	La Silla	E. W. Elst	·	4.1 km	MPC · JPL
21487	1998 HV_{148}	—	April 25, 1998	La Silla	E. W. Elst	·	5.3 km	MPC · JPL
21488 Danyellelee	1998 HT_{150}	Danyellelee	April 21, 1998	Socorro	LINEAR	·	2.2 km	MPC · JPL
21489	1998 JU	—	May 1, 1998	Haleakala	NEAT	·	5.0 km	MPC · JPL
21490	1998 JW	—	May 1, 1998	Haleakala	NEAT	·	6.6 km	MPC · JPL
21491	1998 JL_{1}	—	May 1, 1998	Haleakala	NEAT	NYS	3.0 km	MPC · JPL
21492	1998 JQ_{1}	—	May 1, 1998	Haleakala	NEAT	·	2.9 km	MPC · JPL
21493	1998 JA_{2}	—	May 1, 1998	Haleakala	NEAT	·	7.8 km	MPC · JPL
21494	1998 JE_{2}	—	May 1, 1998	Haleakala	NEAT	NYS	4.8 km	MPC · JPL
21495 Feaga	1998 JP_{2}	Feaga	May 1, 1998	Anderson Mesa	LONEOS	·	3.6 km	MPC · JPL
21496 Lijianyang	1998 JQ_{2}	Lijianyang	May 1, 1998	Anderson Mesa	LONEOS	·	7.3 km	MPC · JPL
21497 Alicehine	1998 JJ_{3}	Alicehine	May 1, 1998	Anderson Mesa	LONEOS	·	2.2 km	MPC · JPL
21498 Keenanferar	1998 KQ_{2}	Keenanferar	May 22, 1998	Socorro	LINEAR	PHO	3.9 km	MPC · JPL
21499 Perillat	1998 KS_{4}	Perillat	May 22, 1998	Anderson Mesa	LONEOS	slow	4.2 km	MPC · JPL
21500 Vazquez	1998 KS_{6}	Vazquez	May 22, 1998	Anderson Mesa	LONEOS	·	4.8 km	MPC · JPL

== 21501–21600 ==
back to top

Designation			Discovery			Properties		Ref
Permanent	Provisional	Named after	Date	Site	Discoverer(s)	Category	Diam.	Ref
21501 Acevedo	1998 KC_{8}	Acevedo	May 23, 1998	Anderson Mesa	LONEOS	·	3.1 km	MPC · JPL
21502 Cruz	1998 KB_{9}	Cruz	May 24, 1998	Anderson Mesa	LONEOS	·	3.2 km	MPC · JPL
21503 Beksha	1998 KL_{18}	Beksha	May 22, 1998	Socorro	LINEAR	·	2.6 km	MPC · JPL
21504 Caseyfreeman	1998 KS_{19}	Caseyfreeman	May 22, 1998	Socorro	LINEAR	·	5.3 km	MPC · JPL
21505 Bernert	1998 KG_{28}	Bernert	May 22, 1998	Socorro	LINEAR	(883)	3.0 km	MPC · JPL
21506 Betsill	1998 KH_{30}	Betsill	May 22, 1998	Socorro	LINEAR	·	4.0 km	MPC · JPL
21507 Bhasin	1998 KZ_{30}	Bhasin	May 22, 1998	Socorro	LINEAR	·	1.9 km	MPC · JPL
21508 Benbrewer	1998 KU_{33}	Benbrewer	May 22, 1998	Socorro	LINEAR	·	3.8 km	MPC · JPL
21509 Lucascavin	1998 KL_{35}	Lucascavin	May 22, 1998	Socorro	LINEAR	(1338) (FLO)	2.4 km	MPC · JPL
21510 Chemnitz	1998 KF_{36}	Chemnitz	May 22, 1998	Socorro	LINEAR	·	5.2 km	MPC · JPL
21511 Chiardola	1998 KT_{36}	Chiardola	May 22, 1998	Socorro	LINEAR	·	3.3 km	MPC · JPL
21512 Susieclary	1998 KE_{40}	Susieclary	May 22, 1998	Socorro	LINEAR	·	4.0 km	MPC · JPL
21513 Bethcochran	1998 KM_{46}	Bethcochran	May 22, 1998	Socorro	LINEAR	V	2.9 km	MPC · JPL
21514 Gamalski	1998 KS_{48}	Gamalski	May 22, 1998	Socorro	LINEAR	·	6.5 km	MPC · JPL
21515 Gavini	1998 KR_{50}	Gavini	May 23, 1998	Socorro	LINEAR	·	4.1 km	MPC · JPL
21516 Mariagodinez	1998 KS_{51}	Mariagodinez	May 23, 1998	Socorro	LINEAR	slow	5.7 km	MPC · JPL
21517 Dobi	1998 KS_{52}	Dobi	May 23, 1998	Socorro	LINEAR	·	3.3 km	MPC · JPL
21518 Maysunhasan	1998 KO_{53}	Maysunhasan	May 23, 1998	Socorro	LINEAR	EUN	5.2 km	MPC · JPL
21519 Josephhenry	1998 KR_{54}	Josephhenry	May 23, 1998	Socorro	LINEAR	PHO	3.8 km	MPC · JPL
21520 Dianaeheart	1998 KR_{55}	Dianaeheart	May 23, 1998	Socorro	LINEAR	·	5.8 km	MPC · JPL
21521 Hippalgaonkar	1998 KU_{55}	Hippalgaonkar	May 23, 1998	Socorro	LINEAR	·	6.2 km	MPC · JPL
21522 Entwisle	1998 MX_{11}	Entwisle	June 19, 1998	Socorro	LINEAR	RAF	3.1 km	MPC · JPL
21523 GONG	1998 MW_{15}	GONG	June 26, 1998	Goodricke-Pigott	R. A. Tucker	·	10 km	MPC · JPL
21524	1998 MB_{16}	—	June 21, 1998	Kitt Peak	Spacewatch	·	5.9 km	MPC · JPL
21525	1998 MP_{23}	—	June 25, 1998	Kitt Peak	Spacewatch	DOR	12 km	MPC · JPL
21526 Mirano	1998 MS_{24}	Mirano	June 30, 1998	Farra d'Isonzo	Farra d'Isonzo	·	4.1 km	MPC · JPL
21527 Horton	1998 MV_{27}	Horton	June 24, 1998	Socorro	LINEAR	EUN · moon	5.0 km	MPC · JPL
21528 Chrisfaust	1998 MU_{33}	Chrisfaust	June 24, 1998	Socorro	LINEAR	·	3.6 km	MPC · JPL
21529 Johnjames	1998 MF_{37}	Johnjames	June 26, 1998	Socorro	LINEAR	·	6.1 km	MPC · JPL
21530 Despiau	1998 MB_{38}	Despiau	June 26, 1998	Anderson Mesa	LONEOS	·	10 km	MPC · JPL
21531 Billcollin	1998 OS	Billcollin	July 20, 1998	Caussols	ODAS	·	6.3 km	MPC · JPL
21532	1998 OY	—	July 20, 1998	Caussols	ODAS	·	4.8 km	MPC · JPL
21533	1998 OR_{12}	—	July 26, 1998	La Silla	E. W. Elst	KOR	6.4 km	MPC · JPL
21534	1998 OV_{12}	—	July 26, 1998	La Silla	E. W. Elst	HOF	12 km	MPC · JPL
21535	1998 OX_{13}	—	July 26, 1998	La Silla	E. W. Elst	·	7.2 km	MPC · JPL
21536	1998 OV_{14}	—	July 26, 1998	La Silla	E. W. Elst	MAR	6.0 km	MPC · JPL
21537 Fréchet	1998 PQ	Fréchet	August 15, 1998	Prescott	P. G. Comba	THM	6.8 km	MPC · JPL
21538	1998 QN_{1}	—	August 17, 1998	Višnjan Observatory	Višnjan	·	8.6 km	MPC · JPL
21539 Josefhlávka	1998 QO_{4}	Josefhlávka	August 20, 1998	Ondřejov	P. Pravec	·	12 km	MPC · JPL
21540 Itthipanyanan	1998 QE_{11}	Itthipanyanan	August 17, 1998	Socorro	LINEAR	·	12 km	MPC · JPL
21541 Friskop	1998 QP_{16}	Friskop	August 17, 1998	Socorro	LINEAR	EOS	5.7 km	MPC · JPL
21542 Kennajeannet	1998 QA_{22}	Kennajeannet	August 17, 1998	Socorro	LINEAR	(1118)	15 km	MPC · JPL
21543 Jessop	1998 QQ_{24}	Jessop	August 17, 1998	Socorro	LINEAR	·	9.7 km	MPC · JPL
21544 Hermainkhan	1998 QL_{33}	Hermainkhan	August 17, 1998	Socorro	LINEAR	·	4.5 km	MPC · JPL
21545 Koirala	1998 QO_{33}	Koirala	August 17, 1998	Socorro	LINEAR	·	9.2 km	MPC · JPL
21546 Konermann	1998 QH_{34}	Konermann	August 17, 1998	Socorro	LINEAR	·	4.8 km	MPC · JPL
21547 Kottapalli	1998 QK_{38}	Kottapalli	August 17, 1998	Socorro	LINEAR	THM	11 km	MPC · JPL
21548 Briekugler	1998 QX_{38}	Briekugler	August 17, 1998	Socorro	LINEAR	·	11 km	MPC · JPL
21549 Carolinelang	1998 QJ_{44}	Carolinelang	August 17, 1998	Socorro	LINEAR	·	8.0 km	MPC · JPL
21550 Laviolette	1998 QS_{44}	Laviolette	August 17, 1998	Socorro	LINEAR	·	10 km	MPC · JPL
21551 Geyang	1998 QH_{45}	Geyang	August 17, 1998	Socorro	LINEAR	EOS	6.5 km	MPC · JPL
21552 Richardlee	1998 QC_{52}	Richardlee	August 17, 1998	Socorro	LINEAR	HNS · slow	5.6 km	MPC · JPL
21553 Monchicourt	1998 QT_{55}	Monchicourt	August 26, 1998	Caussols	ODAS	·	2.4 km	MPC · JPL
21554 Leechaohsi	1998 QR_{69}	Leechaohsi	August 24, 1998	Socorro	LINEAR	·	15 km	MPC · JPL
21555 Levary	1998 QF_{70}	Levary	August 24, 1998	Socorro	LINEAR	URS	19 km	MPC · JPL
21556 Christineli	1998 QE_{71}	Christineli	August 24, 1998	Socorro	LINEAR	·	7.3 km	MPC · JPL
21557 Daniellitt	1998 QE_{73}	Daniellitt	August 24, 1998	Socorro	LINEAR	EOS	12 km	MPC · JPL
21558 Alisonliu	1998 QW_{77}	Alisonliu	August 24, 1998	Socorro	LINEAR	EUN	6.7 km	MPC · JPL
21559 Jingyuanluo	1998 QE_{78}	Jingyuanluo	August 24, 1998	Socorro	LINEAR	·	10 km	MPC · JPL
21560 Analyons	1998 QC_{91}	Analyons	August 28, 1998	Socorro	LINEAR	EOS · slow	8.5 km	MPC · JPL
21561 Masterman	1998 QR_{93}	Masterman	August 28, 1998	Socorro	LINEAR	EUN · slow	7.1 km	MPC · JPL
21562 Chrismessick	1998 QZ_{94}	Chrismessick	August 19, 1998	Socorro	LINEAR	EUN	3.6 km	MPC · JPL
21563 Chetgervais	1998 QW_{95}	Chetgervais	August 19, 1998	Socorro	LINEAR	·	7.6 km	MPC · JPL
21564 Widmanstätten	1998 QQ_{101}	Widmanstätten	August 26, 1998	La Silla	E. W. Elst	·	18 km	MPC · JPL
21565	1998 QZ_{102}	—	August 26, 1998	La Silla	E. W. Elst	·	13 km	MPC · JPL
21566	1998 QM_{103}	—	August 26, 1998	La Silla	E. W. Elst	KOR	5.2 km	MPC · JPL
21567	1998 RB_{2}	—	September 1, 1998	Woomera	F. B. Zoltowski	·	2.6 km	MPC · JPL
21568 Evanmorikawa	1998 RM_{3}	Evanmorikawa	September 14, 1998	Socorro	LINEAR	PHO	4.4 km	MPC · JPL
21569	1998 RX_{12}	—	September 14, 1998	Kitt Peak	Spacewatch	THM	8.0 km	MPC · JPL
21570 Muralidhar	1998 RK_{33}	Muralidhar	September 14, 1998	Socorro	LINEAR	EUN	18 km	MPC · JPL
21571 Naegeli	1998 RD_{51}	Naegeli	September 14, 1998	Socorro	LINEAR	·	5.0 km	MPC · JPL
21572 Nguyen-McCarty	1998 RQ_{52}	Nguyen-McCarty	September 14, 1998	Socorro	LINEAR	·	4.0 km	MPC · JPL
21573	1998 RP_{70}	—	September 14, 1998	Socorro	LINEAR	CYB	14 km	MPC · JPL
21574 Ouzan	1998 RZ_{71}	Ouzan	September 14, 1998	Socorro	LINEAR	·	5.3 km	MPC · JPL
21575 Padmanabhan	1998 RB_{80}	Padmanabhan	September 14, 1998	Socorro	LINEAR	MRX	5.0 km	MPC · JPL
21576 McGivney	1998 SH_{4}	McGivney	September 19, 1998	Needville	Dillon, W. G.	THM	8.9 km	MPC · JPL
21577 Negron	1998 SU_{24}	Negron	September 17, 1998	Anderson Mesa	LONEOS	·	3.2 km	MPC · JPL
21578 Davidgillette	1998 SN_{27}	Davidgillette	September 24, 1998	Catalina	CSS	·	17 km	MPC · JPL
21579	1998 SK_{45}	—	September 25, 1998	Kitt Peak	Spacewatch	THM	8.5 km	MPC · JPL
21580 Portalatin	1998 SY_{57}	Portalatin	September 17, 1998	Anderson Mesa	LONEOS	KOR	6.2 km	MPC · JPL
21581 Ernestoruiz	1998 SD_{58}	Ernestoruiz	September 17, 1998	Anderson Mesa	LONEOS	EOS	13 km	MPC · JPL
21582 Arunvenkataraman	1998 SE_{58}	Arunvenkataraman	September 17, 1998	Anderson Mesa	LONEOS	·	4.7 km	MPC · JPL
21583 Caropietsch	1998 SQ_{108}	Caropietsch	September 26, 1998	Socorro	LINEAR	HYG · slow	18 km	MPC · JPL
21584 Polepeddi	1998 SK_{121}	Polepeddi	September 26, 1998	Socorro	LINEAR	·	8.8 km	MPC · JPL
21585 Polmear	1998 SX_{126}	Polmear	September 26, 1998	Socorro	LINEAR	·	5.4 km	MPC · JPL
21586 Pourkaviani	1998 SU_{129}	Pourkaviani	September 26, 1998	Socorro	LINEAR	THM	17 km	MPC · JPL
21587 Christopynn	1998 SE_{132}	Christopynn	September 26, 1998	Socorro	LINEAR	·	21 km	MPC · JPL
21588 Gianelli	1998 SK_{157}	Gianelli	September 26, 1998	Socorro	LINEAR	THM	7.3 km	MPC · JPL
21589 Rafes	1998 SR_{162}	Rafes	September 26, 1998	Socorro	LINEAR	·	5.3 km	MPC · JPL
21590	1998 TK	—	October 10, 1998	Oizumi	T. Kobayashi	EOS	7.9 km	MPC · JPL
21591	1998 TA_{6}	—	October 15, 1998	Višnjan Observatory	K. Korlević	EUN	5.3 km	MPC · JPL
21592	1998 VJ_{5}	—	November 8, 1998	Nachi-Katsuura	Y. Shimizu, T. Urata	·	9.1 km	MPC · JPL
21593	1998 VL_{27}	—	November 10, 1998	Socorro	LINEAR	L4	22 km	MPC · JPL
21594	1998 VP_{31}	—	November 13, 1998	Višnjan Observatory	K. Korlević	CLO ·	9.8 km	MPC · JPL
21595	1998 WJ_{5}	—	November 18, 1998	Catalina	CSS	L4	35 km	MPC · JPL
21596	1998 WG_{7}	—	November 23, 1998	Oohira	T. Urata	·	7.3 km	MPC · JPL
21597	1998 WA_{8}	—	November 18, 1998	Kushiro	S. Ueda, H. Kaneda	EOS	11 km	MPC · JPL
21598	1998 WP_{9}	—	November 28, 1998	Višnjan Observatory	K. Korlević	·	3.1 km	MPC · JPL
21599	1998 WA_{15}	—	November 21, 1998	Socorro	LINEAR	L4	28 km	MPC · JPL
21600	1998 XL_{5}	—	December 7, 1998	Višnjan Observatory	K. Korlević	EOS	10 km	MPC · JPL

== 21601–21700 ==
back to top

Designation			Discovery			Properties		Ref
Permanent	Provisional	Named after	Date	Site	Discoverer(s)	Category	Diam.	Ref
21601 Aias	1998 XO_{89}	Aias	December 15, 1998	Socorro	LINEAR	L4	55 km	MPC · JPL
21602 Ialmenus	1998 YW_{1}	Ialmenus	December 17, 1998	Kleť	M. Tichý, Z. Moravec	L4	16 km	MPC · JPL
21603	1999 BY	—	January 17, 1999	Catalina	CSS	·	6.3 km	MPC · JPL
21604	1999 BS_{3}	—	January 19, 1999	Višnjan Observatory	K. Korlević	KOR	5.1 km	MPC · JPL
21605 Reynoso	1999 CL_{81}	Reynoso	February 12, 1999	Socorro	LINEAR	EOS	8.0 km	MPC · JPL
21606	1999 FH_{6}	—	March 17, 1999	Caussols	ODAS	·	2.4 km	MPC · JPL
21607 Robel	1999 GG_{34}	Robel	April 6, 1999	Socorro	LINEAR	·	10 km	MPC · JPL
21608 Gloyna	1999 GQ_{35}	Gloyna	April 7, 1999	Socorro	LINEAR	·	3.0 km	MPC · JPL
21609 Williamcaleb	1999 JQ_{41}	Williamcaleb	May 10, 1999	Socorro	LINEAR	slow	4.4 km	MPC · JPL
21610 Rosengard	1999 JE_{48}	Rosengard	May 10, 1999	Socorro	LINEAR	·	7.4 km	MPC · JPL
21611 Rosoff	1999 JV_{50}	Rosoff	May 10, 1999	Socorro	LINEAR	EUN	4.4 km	MPC · JPL
21612 Chelsagloria	1999 JS_{57}	Chelsagloria	May 10, 1999	Socorro	LINEAR	·	4.2 km	MPC · JPL
21613 Schlecht	1999 JF_{68}	Schlecht	May 12, 1999	Socorro	LINEAR	·	3.8 km	MPC · JPL
21614 Grochowski	1999 JW_{75}	Grochowski	May 10, 1999	Socorro	LINEAR	·	4.0 km	MPC · JPL
21615 Guardamano	1999 JQ_{76}	Guardamano	May 10, 1999	Socorro	LINEAR	·	1.8 km	MPC · JPL
21616 Guhagilford	1999 JQ_{82}	Guhagilford	May 12, 1999	Socorro	LINEAR	V	2.6 km	MPC · JPL
21617 Johnhagen	1999 JO_{119}	Johnhagen	May 13, 1999	Socorro	LINEAR	·	3.9 km	MPC · JPL
21618 Sheikh	1999 JT_{122}	Sheikh	May 13, 1999	Socorro	LINEAR	·	1.9 km	MPC · JPL
21619 Johnshopkins	1999 JN_{136}	Johnshopkins	May 9, 1999	Anderson Mesa	LONEOS	·	2.7 km	MPC · JPL
21620	1999 KU	—	May 16, 1999	Catalina	CSS	·	6.1 km	MPC · JPL
21621 Sherman	1999 KR_{4}	Sherman	May 20, 1999	Socorro	LINEAR	·	8.1 km	MPC · JPL
21622 Victorshia	1999 LV_{22}	Victorshia	June 9, 1999	Socorro	LINEAR	·	2.7 km	MPC · JPL
21623 Albertshieh	1999 LS_{24}	Albertshieh	June 9, 1999	Socorro	LINEAR	·	3.8 km	MPC · JPL
21624	1999 NA_{1}	—	July 11, 1999	Višnjan Observatory	K. Korlević	·	9.3 km	MPC · JPL
21625 Seira	1999 NN_{2}	Seira	July 12, 1999	Socorro	LINEAR	TIR	3.9 km	MPC · JPL
21626 Matthewhall	1999 NP_{2}	Matthewhall	July 12, 1999	Socorro	LINEAR	·	3.2 km	MPC · JPL
21627 Sillis	1999 NZ_{3}	Sillis	July 13, 1999	Socorro	LINEAR	·	7.6 km	MPC · JPL
21628 Lucashof	1999 ND_{4}	Lucashof	July 13, 1999	Socorro	LINEAR	·	3.1 km	MPC · JPL
21629 Siperstein	1999 NT_{8}	Siperstein	July 13, 1999	Socorro	LINEAR	·	2.4 km	MPC · JPL
21630 Wootensmith	1999 NM_{9}	Wootensmith	July 13, 1999	Socorro	LINEAR	·	2.8 km	MPC · JPL
21631 Stephenhonan	1999 NU_{10}	Stephenhonan	July 13, 1999	Socorro	LINEAR	·	3.8 km	MPC · JPL
21632 Suwanasri	1999 NR_{11}	Suwanasri	July 13, 1999	Socorro	LINEAR	·	8.3 km	MPC · JPL
21633 Hsingpenyuan	1999 NW_{11}	Hsingpenyuan	July 13, 1999	Socorro	LINEAR	V	3.5 km	MPC · JPL
21634 Huangweikang	1999 NB_{18}	Huangweikang	July 14, 1999	Socorro	LINEAR	·	3.3 km	MPC · JPL
21635 Micahtoll	1999 NU_{19}	Micahtoll	July 14, 1999	Socorro	LINEAR	NYS	2.2 km	MPC · JPL
21636 Huertas	1999 NS_{34}	Huertas	July 14, 1999	Socorro	LINEAR	·	3.2 km	MPC · JPL
21637 Ninahuffman	1999 NH_{36}	Ninahuffman	July 14, 1999	Socorro	LINEAR	·	2.4 km	MPC · JPL
21638 Nicjachowski	1999 NA_{39}	Nicjachowski	July 14, 1999	Socorro	LINEAR	·	2.4 km	MPC · JPL
21639 Davidkaufman	1999 ND_{39}	Davidkaufman	July 14, 1999	Socorro	LINEAR	(2076)	5.8 km	MPC · JPL
21640 Petekirkland	1999 NX_{39}	Petekirkland	July 14, 1999	Socorro	LINEAR	·	2.6 km	MPC · JPL
21641 Tiffanyko	1999 NC_{40}	Tiffanyko	July 14, 1999	Socorro	LINEAR	·	3.0 km	MPC · JPL
21642 Kominers	1999 NH_{41}	Kominers	July 14, 1999	Socorro	LINEAR	·	2.2 km	MPC · JPL
21643 Kornev	1999 NJ_{42}	Kornev	July 14, 1999	Socorro	LINEAR	·	2.1 km	MPC · JPL
21644 Vinay	1999 NA_{50}	Vinay	July 13, 1999	Socorro	LINEAR	·	4.4 km	MPC · JPL
21645 Chentsaiwei	1999 NZ_{50}	Chentsaiwei	July 14, 1999	Socorro	LINEAR	EUN	4.0 km	MPC · JPL
21646 Joshuaturner	1999 NK_{53}	Joshuaturner	July 12, 1999	Socorro	LINEAR	EUN	3.7 km	MPC · JPL
21647 Carlturner	1999 NE_{54}	Carlturner	July 12, 1999	Socorro	LINEAR	·	8.6 km	MPC · JPL
21648 Gravanschaik	1999 NB_{57}	Gravanschaik	July 12, 1999	Socorro	LINEAR	·	8.8 km	MPC · JPL
21649 Vardhana	1999 NQ_{59}	Vardhana	July 13, 1999	Socorro	LINEAR	·	3.7 km	MPC · JPL
21650 Tilgner	1999 OB_{1}	Tilgner	July 17, 1999	Gnosca	S. Sposetti	V	2.1 km	MPC · JPL
21651 Mission Valley	1999 OF_{1}	Mission Valley	July 19, 1999	Farpoint	G. Bell	·	5.1 km	MPC · JPL
21652 Vasishtha	1999 OQ_{2}	Vasishtha	July 22, 1999	Socorro	LINEAR	·	11 km	MPC · JPL
21653 Davidwang	1999 OH_{3}	Davidwang	July 22, 1999	Socorro	LINEAR	TIN	8.8 km	MPC · JPL
21654 Telmo	1999 PZ	Telmo	August 5, 1999	Mallorca	Á. López J., R. Pacheco	·	3.8 km	MPC · JPL
21655 Niklauswirth	1999 PC_{1}	Niklauswirth	August 8, 1999	Ondřejov	L. Kotková	EUN	6.6 km	MPC · JPL
21656 Knuth	1999 PX_{1}	Knuth	August 9, 1999	Ondřejov	P. Pravec, P. Kušnirák	·	6.3 km	MPC · JPL
21657 Alinecarter	1999 PZ_{1}	Alinecarter	August 10, 1999	Reedy Creek	J. Broughton	·	2.9 km	MPC · JPL
21658	1999 PA_{2}	—	August 10, 1999	Reedy Creek	J. Broughton	·	2.3 km	MPC · JPL
21659 Fredholm	1999 PR_{3}	Fredholm	August 13, 1999	Prescott	P. G. Comba	·	4.1 km	MPC · JPL
21660 Velenia	1999 QZ_{1}	Velenia	August 20, 1999	Ondřejov	P. Pravec	PAD	6.0 km	MPC · JPL
21661 Olgagermani	1999 RA	Olgagermani	September 1, 1999	Ceccano	G. Masi	·	5.7 km	MPC · JPL
21662 Benigni	1999 RC	Benigni	September 1, 1999	Stroncone	Santa Lucia	EUN	4.9 km	MPC · JPL
21663 Banat	1999 RM	Banat	September 3, 1999	Starkenburg Observatory	Starkenburg	EMA	11 km	MPC · JPL
21664 Konradzuse	1999 RG_{1}	Konradzuse	September 4, 1999	Ondřejov	L. Kotková	·	4.2 km	MPC · JPL
21665 Frege	1999 RR_{1}	Frege	September 5, 1999	Prescott	P. G. Comba	·	2.0 km	MPC · JPL
21666	1999 RW_{1}	—	September 5, 1999	Višnjan Observatory	K. Korlević	·	7.3 km	MPC · JPL
21667	1999 RB_{3}	—	September 6, 1999	Višnjan Observatory	K. Korlević	·	2.7 km	MPC · JPL
21668	1999 RS_{6}	—	September 3, 1999	Kitt Peak	Spacewatch	·	5.9 km	MPC · JPL
21669	1999 RF_{8}	—	September 4, 1999	Kitt Peak	Spacewatch	·	2.5 km	MPC · JPL
21670 Kuan	1999 RD_{11}	Kuan	September 7, 1999	Socorro	LINEAR	·	2.6 km	MPC · JPL
21671 Warrener	1999 RP_{12}	Warrener	September 7, 1999	Socorro	LINEAR	MAR	4.2 km	MPC · JPL
21672 Laichunju	1999 RK_{14}	Laichunju	September 7, 1999	Socorro	LINEAR	RAF	3.8 km	MPC · JPL
21673 Leatherman	1999 RL_{15}	Leatherman	September 7, 1999	Socorro	LINEAR	V	2.1 km	MPC · JPL
21674 Renaldowebb	1999 RG_{18}	Renaldowebb	September 7, 1999	Socorro	LINEAR	MAR	4.1 km	MPC · JPL
21675 Kaitlinmaria	1999 RM_{22}	Kaitlinmaria	September 7, 1999	Socorro	LINEAR	·	3.6 km	MPC · JPL
21676 Maureenanne	1999 RB_{23}	Maureenanne	September 7, 1999	Socorro	LINEAR	·	11 km	MPC · JPL
21677 Tylerlyon	1999 RO_{23}	Tylerlyon	September 7, 1999	Socorro	LINEAR	·	3.0 km	MPC · JPL
21678 Lindner	1999 RK_{27}	Lindner	September 5, 1999	Drebach	G. Lehmann, J. Kandler	·	3.7 km	MPC · JPL
21679 Bettypalermiti	1999 RD_{28}	Bettypalermiti	September 8, 1999	Fountain Hills	C. W. Juels	·	2.7 km	MPC · JPL
21680 Richardschwartz	1999 RS_{31}	Richardschwartz	September 9, 1999	Farra d'Isonzo	Farra d'Isonzo	PAD	6.5 km	MPC · JPL
21681	1999 RN_{32}	—	September 9, 1999	Višnjan Observatory	K. Korlević	VER	8.5 km	MPC · JPL
21682 Peštafrantišek	1999 RT_{32}	Peštafrantišek	September 9, 1999	Ondřejov	P. Pravec, P. Kušnirák	·	3.5 km	MPC · JPL
21683 Segal	1999 RL_{33}	Segal	September 9, 1999	Fountain Hills	C. W. Juels	(2076)	4.3 km	MPC · JPL
21684 Alinafiocca	1999 RR_{33}	Alinafiocca	September 4, 1999	Anza	White, M., M. Collins	·	3.6 km	MPC · JPL
21685 Francomallia	1999 RL_{35}	Francomallia	September 11, 1999	Ceccano	G. Masi	KOR	4.2 km	MPC · JPL
21686 Koschny	1999 RB_{36}	Koschny	September 11, 1999	Drebach	~Knöfel, A.	·	1.8 km	MPC · JPL
21687 Filopanti	1999 RB_{37}	Filopanti	September 11, 1999	Bologna	San Vittore	·	4.0 km	MPC · JPL
21688	1999 RK_{37}	—	September 11, 1999	Socorro	LINEAR	H	9.2 km	MPC · JPL
21689	1999 RL_{38}	—	September 13, 1999	Višnjan Observatory	K. Korlević	·	5.5 km	MPC · JPL
21690	1999 RA_{39}	—	September 13, 1999	Reedy Creek	J. Broughton	PHO	4.9 km	MPC · JPL
21691	1999 RC_{42}	—	September 13, 1999	Višnjan Observatory	K. Korlević	·	3.2 km	MPC · JPL
21692	1999 RH_{44}	—	September 15, 1999	Reedy Creek	J. Broughton	·	3.1 km	MPC · JPL
21693	1999 RT_{44}	—	September 14, 1999	Črni Vrh	Mikuž, H.	EUN	5.1 km	MPC · JPL
21694 Allisowilson	1999 RL_{48}	Allisowilson	September 7, 1999	Socorro	LINEAR	(5)	4.0 km	MPC · JPL
21695 Hannahwolf	1999 RG_{49}	Hannahwolf	September 7, 1999	Socorro	LINEAR	NYS	2.2 km	MPC · JPL
21696 Ermalmquist	1999 RC_{52}	Ermalmquist	September 7, 1999	Socorro	LINEAR	·	6.4 km	MPC · JPL
21697 Mascharak	1999 RW_{54}	Mascharak	September 7, 1999	Socorro	LINEAR	·	3.6 km	MPC · JPL
21698 McCarron	1999 RD_{56}	McCarron	September 7, 1999	Socorro	LINEAR	·	3.5 km	MPC · JPL
21699 Wolpert	1999 RE_{64}	Wolpert	September 7, 1999	Socorro	LINEAR	THM	10 km	MPC · JPL
21700 Caseynicole	1999 RD_{72}	Caseynicole	September 7, 1999	Socorro	LINEAR	(5)	3.0 km	MPC · JPL

== 21701–21800 ==
back to top

Designation			Discovery			Properties		Ref
Permanent	Provisional	Named after	Date	Site	Discoverer(s)	Category	Diam.	Ref
21701 Gabemendoza	1999 RP_{72}	Gabemendoza	September 7, 1999	Socorro	LINEAR	KOR	4.3 km	MPC · JPL
21702 Prisymendoza	1999 RA_{73}	Prisymendoza	September 7, 1999	Socorro	LINEAR	·	2.4 km	MPC · JPL
21703 Shravanimikk	1999 RM_{73}	Shravanimikk	September 7, 1999	Socorro	LINEAR	·	2.6 km	MPC · JPL
21704 Mikkilineni	1999 RD_{85}	Mikkilineni	September 7, 1999	Socorro	LINEAR	·	4.3 km	MPC · JPL
21705 Subinmin	1999 RA_{86}	Subinmin	September 7, 1999	Socorro	LINEAR	·	4.9 km	MPC · JPL
21706 Robminehart	1999 RM_{87}	Robminehart	September 7, 1999	Socorro	LINEAR	THM	9.5 km	MPC · JPL
21707 Johnmoore	1999 RY_{88}	Johnmoore	September 7, 1999	Socorro	LINEAR	·	3.7 km	MPC · JPL
21708 Mulhall	1999 RV_{90}	Mulhall	September 7, 1999	Socorro	LINEAR	·	5.0 km	MPC · JPL
21709 Sethmurray	1999 RK_{92}	Sethmurray	September 7, 1999	Socorro	LINEAR	fast	4.3 km	MPC · JPL
21710 Nijhawan	1999 RS_{92}	Nijhawan	September 7, 1999	Socorro	LINEAR	AST	6.5 km	MPC · JPL
21711 Wilfredwong	1999 RE_{95}	Wilfredwong	September 7, 1999	Socorro	LINEAR	·	4.0 km	MPC · JPL
21712 Obaid	1999 RL_{96}	Obaid	September 7, 1999	Socorro	LINEAR	·	4.2 km	MPC · JPL
21713 Michaelolson	1999 RW_{97}	Michaelolson	September 7, 1999	Socorro	LINEAR	·	2.3 km	MPC · JPL
21714 Geoffreywoo	1999 RX_{109}	Geoffreywoo	September 8, 1999	Socorro	LINEAR	·	8.3 km	MPC · JPL
21715 Palaniappan	1999 RA_{110}	Palaniappan	September 8, 1999	Socorro	LINEAR	·	3.9 km	MPC · JPL
21716 Panchamia	1999 RX_{113}	Panchamia	September 9, 1999	Socorro	LINEAR	·	2.0 km	MPC · JPL
21717 Pang	1999 RO_{114}	Pang	September 9, 1999	Socorro	LINEAR	KOR	4.3 km	MPC · JPL
21718 Cheonghapark	1999 RO_{115}	Cheonghapark	September 9, 1999	Socorro	LINEAR	·	3.8 km	MPC · JPL
21719 Pasricha	1999 RR_{115}	Pasricha	September 9, 1999	Socorro	LINEAR	·	4.3 km	MPC · JPL
21720 Pilishvili	1999 RQ_{119}	Pilishvili	September 9, 1999	Socorro	LINEAR	·	3.2 km	MPC · JPL
21721 Feiniqu	1999 RY_{119}	Feiniqu	September 9, 1999	Socorro	LINEAR	V	1.9 km	MPC · JPL
21722 Rambhia	1999 RX_{120}	Rambhia	September 9, 1999	Socorro	LINEAR	·	2.3 km	MPC · JPL
21723 Yinyinwu	1999 RT_{128}	Yinyinwu	September 9, 1999	Socorro	LINEAR	slow	8.2 km	MPC · JPL
21724 Ratai	1999 RA_{132}	Ratai	September 9, 1999	Socorro	LINEAR	V	2.1 km	MPC · JPL
21725 Zhongyuechen	1999 RB_{132}	Zhongyuechen	September 9, 1999	Socorro	LINEAR	EOS	6.2 km	MPC · JPL
21726 Rezvanian	1999 RB_{134}	Rezvanian	September 9, 1999	Socorro	LINEAR	·	4.0 km	MPC · JPL
21727 Rhines	1999 RY_{135}	Rhines	September 9, 1999	Socorro	LINEAR	·	2.1 km	MPC · JPL
21728 Zhuzhirui	1999 RH_{136}	Zhuzhirui	September 9, 1999	Socorro	LINEAR	·	3.3 km	MPC · JPL
21729 Kimrichards	1999 RE_{137}	Kimrichards	September 9, 1999	Socorro	LINEAR	·	2.4 km	MPC · JPL
21730 Ignaciorod	1999 RG_{138}	Ignaciorod	September 9, 1999	Socorro	LINEAR	·	2.3 km	MPC · JPL
21731 Zhuruochen	1999 RT_{142}	Zhuruochen	September 9, 1999	Socorro	LINEAR	MAR	5.2 km	MPC · JPL
21732 Rumery	1999 RW_{142}	Rumery	September 9, 1999	Socorro	LINEAR	·	3.9 km	MPC · JPL
21733 Schlottmann	1999 RX_{145}	Schlottmann	September 9, 1999	Socorro	LINEAR	·	2.3 km	MPC · JPL
21734	1999 RM_{146}	—	September 9, 1999	Socorro	LINEAR	EOS	6.6 km	MPC · JPL
21735 Nissaschmidt	1999 RV_{146}	Nissaschmidt	September 9, 1999	Socorro	LINEAR	V	3.0 km	MPC · JPL
21736 Samaschneid	1999 RW_{149}	Samaschneid	September 9, 1999	Socorro	LINEAR	·	6.0 km	MPC · JPL
21737 Stephenshulz	1999 RV_{151}	Stephenshulz	September 9, 1999	Socorro	LINEAR	·	6.4 km	MPC · JPL
21738 Schwank	1999 RB_{153}	Schwank	September 9, 1999	Socorro	LINEAR	·	3.3 km	MPC · JPL
21739 Annekeschwob	1999 RN_{157}	Annekeschwob	September 9, 1999	Socorro	LINEAR	·	2.2 km	MPC · JPL
21740	1999 RR_{159}	—	September 9, 1999	Socorro	LINEAR	ADE	7.1 km	MPC · JPL
21741	1999 RN_{162}	—	September 9, 1999	Socorro	LINEAR	·	5.4 km	MPC · JPL
21742 Rachaelscott	1999 RU_{163}	Rachaelscott	September 9, 1999	Socorro	LINEAR	·	5.0 km	MPC · JPL
21743 Michaelsegal	1999 RB_{164}	Michaelsegal	September 9, 1999	Socorro	LINEAR	·	6.3 km	MPC · JPL
21744 Meliselinger	1999 RF_{168}	Meliselinger	September 9, 1999	Socorro	LINEAR	NYS	2.8 km	MPC · JPL
21745 Shadfan	1999 RX_{168}	Shadfan	September 9, 1999	Socorro	LINEAR	·	3.5 km	MPC · JPL
21746 Carrieshaw	1999 RZ_{169}	Carrieshaw	September 9, 1999	Socorro	LINEAR	·	1.8 km	MPC · JPL
21747 Justsolomon	1999 RD_{170}	Justsolomon	September 9, 1999	Socorro	LINEAR	·	5.9 km	MPC · JPL
21748 Srinivasan	1999 RH_{170}	Srinivasan	September 9, 1999	Socorro	LINEAR	·	2.3 km	MPC · JPL
21749	1999 RM_{172}	—	September 9, 1999	Socorro	LINEAR	·	5.0 km	MPC · JPL
21750 Tartakahashi	1999 RG_{173}	Tartakahashi	September 9, 1999	Socorro	LINEAR	(883)	2.0 km	MPC · JPL
21751 Jennytaylor	1999 RT_{176}	Jennytaylor	September 9, 1999	Socorro	LINEAR	NYS	3.2 km	MPC · JPL
21752 Johnthurmon	1999 RC_{179}	Johnthurmon	September 9, 1999	Socorro	LINEAR	·	3.0 km	MPC · JPL
21753 Trudel	1999 RJ_{180}	Trudel	September 9, 1999	Socorro	LINEAR	·	3.8 km	MPC · JPL
21754 Tvaruzkova	1999 RZ_{183}	Tvaruzkova	September 9, 1999	Socorro	LINEAR	·	1.9 km	MPC · JPL
21755	1999 RE_{190}	—	September 10, 1999	Socorro	LINEAR	fast	5.5 km	MPC · JPL
21756	1999 RB_{192}	—	September 13, 1999	Socorro	LINEAR	·	2.2 km	MPC · JPL
21757	1999 RQ_{194}	—	September 7, 1999	Socorro	LINEAR	·	14 km	MPC · JPL
21758 Adrianveres	1999 RT_{196}	Adrianveres	September 8, 1999	Socorro	LINEAR	V	2.8 km	MPC · JPL
21759	1999 RG_{197}	—	September 8, 1999	Socorro	LINEAR	PHO	2.7 km	MPC · JPL
21760	1999 RM_{199}	—	September 8, 1999	Socorro	LINEAR	·	9.1 km	MPC · JPL
21761	1999 RB_{201}	—	September 8, 1999	Socorro	LINEAR	EUN	3.0 km	MPC · JPL
21762	1999 RD_{201}	—	September 8, 1999	Socorro	LINEAR	MAR	3.9 km	MPC · JPL
21763	1999 RR_{201}	—	September 8, 1999	Socorro	LINEAR	·	5.8 km	MPC · JPL
21764	1999 RY_{205}	—	September 8, 1999	Socorro	LINEAR	EUN	4.5 km	MPC · JPL
21765	1999 RU_{206}	—	September 8, 1999	Socorro	LINEAR	·	7.8 km	MPC · JPL
21766	1999 RW_{208}	—	September 8, 1999	Socorro	LINEAR	·	18 km	MPC · JPL
21767	1999 RB_{209}	—	September 8, 1999	Socorro	LINEAR	·	5.3 km	MPC · JPL
21768	1999 RL_{210}	—	September 8, 1999	Socorro	LINEAR	·	12 km	MPC · JPL
21769	1999 RS_{210}	—	September 8, 1999	Socorro	LINEAR	·	3.7 km	MPC · JPL
21770 Wangyiran	1999 RF_{211}	Wangyiran	September 8, 1999	Socorro	LINEAR	·	3.7 km	MPC · JPL
21771	1999 RQ_{211}	—	September 8, 1999	Socorro	LINEAR	·	7.3 km	MPC · JPL
21772	1999 RU_{211}	—	September 8, 1999	Socorro	LINEAR	·	14 km	MPC · JPL
21773	1999 RH_{216}	—	September 7, 1999	Socorro	LINEAR	·	4.2 km	MPC · JPL
21774 O'Brien	1999 RR_{217}	O'Brien	September 3, 1999	Anderson Mesa	LONEOS	V	1.6 km	MPC · JPL
21775 Tsiganis	1999 RC_{221}	Tsiganis	September 5, 1999	Anderson Mesa	LONEOS	·	3.1 km	MPC · JPL
21776 Kryszczyńska	1999 RE_{221}	Kryszczyńska	September 5, 1999	Anderson Mesa	LONEOS	·	3.5 km	MPC · JPL
21777	1999 RS_{221}	—	September 5, 1999	Catalina	CSS	EOS	5.8 km	MPC · JPL
21778 Andrewarren	1999 RF_{225}	Andrewarren	September 7, 1999	Socorro	LINEAR	MAS	2.8 km	MPC · JPL
21779	1999 RE_{231}	—	September 8, 1999	Catalina	CSS	·	3.1 km	MPC · JPL
21780	1999 RY_{237}	—	September 8, 1999	Catalina	CSS	·	3.1 km	MPC · JPL
21781	1999 RE_{239}	—	September 8, 1999	Catalina	CSS	·	2.2 km	MPC · JPL
21782 Davemcdonald	1999 RV_{239}	Davemcdonald	September 8, 1999	Anderson Mesa	LONEOS	·	2.3 km	MPC · JPL
21783	1999 RR_{248}	—	September 7, 1999	Kitt Peak	Spacewatch	·	3.4 km	MPC · JPL
21784	1999 SO_{1}	—	September 17, 1999	Višnjan Observatory	K. Korlević	·	5.6 km	MPC · JPL
21785 Méchain	1999 SS_{2}	Méchain	September 21, 1999	Kleť	M. Tichý	·	4.5 km	MPC · JPL
21786	1999 SB_{4}	—	September 29, 1999	Višnjan Observatory	K. Korlević	·	12 km	MPC · JPL
21787	1999 SG_{4}	—	September 29, 1999	Višnjan Observatory	K. Korlević	EUN	6.2 km	MPC · JPL
21788	1999 SZ_{5}	—	September 30, 1999	Socorro	LINEAR	·	3.3 km	MPC · JPL
21789 Frankwasser	1999 SH_{7}	Frankwasser	September 29, 1999	Socorro	LINEAR	·	3.3 km	MPC · JPL
21790	1999 SN_{7}	—	September 29, 1999	Socorro	LINEAR	·	9.6 km	MPC · JPL
21791 Mattweegman	1999 SR_{7}	Mattweegman	September 29, 1999	Socorro	LINEAR	V	3.4 km	MPC · JPL
21792	1999 ST_{7}	—	September 29, 1999	Socorro	LINEAR	·	14 km	MPC · JPL
21793	1999 SG_{8}	—	September 29, 1999	Socorro	LINEAR	EMA	11 km	MPC · JPL
21794	1999 SK_{8}	—	September 29, 1999	Socorro	LINEAR	EUN	4.9 km	MPC · JPL
21795 Masi	1999 SN_{9}	Masi	September 29, 1999	Campo Catino	F. Mallia	NYS	3.2 km	MPC · JPL
21796	1999 SH_{11}	—	September 30, 1999	Catalina	CSS	·	6.0 km	MPC · JPL
21797	1999 SW_{11}	—	September 30, 1999	Catalina	CSS	·	5.2 km	MPC · JPL
21798 Mitchweegman	1999 SZ_{16}	Mitchweegman	September 30, 1999	Socorro	LINEAR	·	3.3 km	MPC · JPL
21799 Ciociaria	1999 TP	Ciociaria	October 1, 1999	Campo Catino	F. Mallia, G. Masi	·	9.5 km	MPC · JPL
21800	1999 TM_{1}	—	October 1, 1999	Višnjan Observatory	K. Korlević	·	3.1 km	MPC · JPL

== 21801–21900 ==
back to top

Designation			Discovery			Properties		Ref
Permanent	Provisional	Named after	Date	Site	Discoverer(s)	Category	Diam.	Ref
21801 Ančerl	1999 TW_{3}	Ančerl	October 2, 1999	Ondřejov	L. Kotková	·	4.1 km	MPC · JPL
21802 Svoreň	1999 TE_{6}	Svoreň	October 6, 1999	Modra	Kornoš, L., Tóth	·	3.3 km	MPC · JPL
21803	1999 TC_{7}	—	October 6, 1999	Višnjan Observatory	K. Korlević, M. Jurić	V	3.7 km	MPC · JPL
21804 Václavneumann	1999 TC_{8}	Václavneumann	October 4, 1999	Ondřejov	L. Kotková	3:2	9.6 km	MPC · JPL
21805	1999 TQ_{9}	—	October 8, 1999	Višnjan Observatory	K. Korlević, M. Jurić	THM · slow	8.2 km	MPC · JPL
21806	1999 TE_{14}	—	October 10, 1999	Višnjan Observatory	K. Korlević, M. Jurić	·	2.6 km	MPC · JPL
21807	1999 TH_{14}	—	October 10, 1999	Višnjan Observatory	K. Korlević, M. Jurić	THM	8.8 km	MPC · JPL
21808	1999 TR_{18}	—	October 14, 1999	Xinglong	SCAP	KOR	5.6 km	MPC · JPL
21809	1999 TG_{19}	—	October 15, 1999	High Point	D. K. Chesney	·	4.7 km	MPC · JPL
21810	1999 TK_{19}	—	October 9, 1999	Uto	F. Uto	·	3.7 km	MPC · JPL
21811 Burroughs	1999 TR_{20}	Burroughs	October 5, 1999	Goodricke-Pigott	R. A. Tucker	HYG	8.4 km	MPC · JPL
21812	1999 TZ_{22}	—	October 3, 1999	Kitt Peak	Spacewatch	·	4.0 km	MPC · JPL
21813 Danwinegar	1999 TK_{25}	Danwinegar	October 3, 1999	Socorro	LINEAR	·	6.0 km	MPC · JPL
21814 Shanawolff	1999 TQ_{27}	Shanawolff	October 3, 1999	Socorro	LINEAR	·	3.9 km	MPC · JPL
21815 Fanyang	1999 TF_{29}	Fanyang	October 4, 1999	Socorro	LINEAR	·	4.4 km	MPC · JPL
21816	1999 TE_{31}	—	October 4, 1999	Socorro	LINEAR	MAR	4.6 km	MPC · JPL
21817 Yingling	1999 TG_{32}	Yingling	October 4, 1999	Socorro	LINEAR	·	8.0 km	MPC · JPL
21818 Yurkanin	1999 TJ_{32}	Yurkanin	October 4, 1999	Socorro	LINEAR	·	6.5 km	MPC · JPL
21819	1999 TX_{32}	—	October 4, 1999	Socorro	LINEAR	·	9.8 km	MPC · JPL
21820	1999 TQ_{34}	—	October 2, 1999	Socorro	LINEAR	PHO	4.1 km	MPC · JPL
21821 Billryan	1999 TN_{36}	Billryan	October 12, 1999	Anderson Mesa	LONEOS	KOR	3.7 km	MPC · JPL
21822 Degiorgi	1999 TX_{36}	Degiorgi	October 15, 1999	Anderson Mesa	LONEOS	·	4.0 km	MPC · JPL
21823	1999 TX_{72}	—	October 9, 1999	Kitt Peak	Spacewatch	NYS	2.8 km	MPC · JPL
21824	1999 TD_{75}	—	October 10, 1999	Kitt Peak	Spacewatch	·	2.9 km	MPC · JPL
21825 Zhangyizhong	1999 TR_{88}	Zhangyizhong	October 2, 1999	Socorro	LINEAR	·	5.8 km	MPC · JPL
21826 Youjiazhong	1999 TJ_{91}	Youjiazhong	October 2, 1999	Socorro	LINEAR	·	2.2 km	MPC · JPL
21827 Chingzhu	1999 TS_{91}	Chingzhu	October 2, 1999	Socorro	LINEAR	·	3.9 km	MPC · JPL
21828	1999 TN_{92}	—	October 2, 1999	Socorro	LINEAR	·	8.2 km	MPC · JPL
21829 Kaylacornale	1999 TZ_{92}	Kaylacornale	October 2, 1999	Socorro	LINEAR	·	3.3 km	MPC · JPL
21830	1999 TW_{93}	—	October 2, 1999	Socorro	LINEAR	·	6.5 km	MPC · JPL
21831	1999 TX_{93}	—	October 2, 1999	Socorro	LINEAR	·	14 km	MPC · JPL
21832	1999 TZ_{93}	—	October 2, 1999	Socorro	LINEAR	·	2.8 km	MPC · JPL
21833	1999 TE_{95}	—	October 2, 1999	Socorro	LINEAR	V	1.9 km	MPC · JPL
21834	1999 TL_{96}	—	October 2, 1999	Socorro	LINEAR	·	3.7 km	MPC · JPL
21835	1999 TN_{96}	—	October 2, 1999	Socorro	LINEAR	HYG	9.5 km	MPC · JPL
21836	1999 TX_{96}	—	October 2, 1999	Socorro	LINEAR	EOS	7.8 km	MPC · JPL
21837	1999 TL_{97}	—	October 2, 1999	Socorro	LINEAR	V	2.6 km	MPC · JPL
21838	1999 TM_{99}	—	October 2, 1999	Socorro	LINEAR	GEF	4.0 km	MPC · JPL
21839	1999 TP_{100}	—	October 2, 1999	Socorro	LINEAR	KOR	4.3 km	MPC · JPL
21840 Ghoshchoudhury	1999 TT_{101}	Ghoshchoudhury	October 2, 1999	Socorro	LINEAR	V	2.3 km	MPC · JPL
21841	1999 TE_{102}	—	October 2, 1999	Socorro	LINEAR	EOS	6.5 km	MPC · JPL
21842	1999 TH_{102}	—	October 2, 1999	Socorro	LINEAR	·	10 km	MPC · JPL
21843	1999 TF_{105}	—	October 3, 1999	Socorro	LINEAR	·	2.4 km	MPC · JPL
21844	1999 TN_{112}	—	October 4, 1999	Socorro	LINEAR	·	6.3 km	MPC · JPL
21845	1999 TC_{113}	—	October 4, 1999	Socorro	LINEAR	V	2.9 km	MPC · JPL
21846 Wojakowski	1999 TT_{114}	Wojakowski	October 4, 1999	Socorro	LINEAR	·	5.2 km	MPC · JPL
21847	1999 TA_{116}	—	October 4, 1999	Socorro	LINEAR	DOR	9.6 km	MPC · JPL
21848	1999 TO_{116}	—	October 4, 1999	Socorro	LINEAR	·	3.9 km	MPC · JPL
21849	1999 TA_{141}	—	October 6, 1999	Socorro	LINEAR	·	2.7 km	MPC · JPL
21850 Abshir	1999 TF_{142}	Abshir	October 7, 1999	Socorro	LINEAR	·	3.8 km	MPC · JPL
21851	1999 TO_{142}	—	October 7, 1999	Socorro	LINEAR	·	5.9 km	MPC · JPL
21852 Bolander	1999 TR_{143}	Bolander	October 7, 1999	Socorro	LINEAR	·	5.9 km	MPC · JPL
21853 Kelseykay	1999 TU_{146}	Kelseykay	October 7, 1999	Socorro	LINEAR	·	5.2 km	MPC · JPL
21854 Brendandwyer	1999 TJ_{147}	Brendandwyer	October 7, 1999	Socorro	LINEAR	·	3.7 km	MPC · JPL
21855	1999 TG_{150}	—	October 7, 1999	Socorro	LINEAR	THM	11 km	MPC · JPL
21856 Heathermaria	1999 TR_{150}	Heathermaria	October 7, 1999	Socorro	LINEAR	·	2.2 km	MPC · JPL
21857	1999 TJ_{154}	—	October 7, 1999	Socorro	LINEAR	KOR	4.9 km	MPC · JPL
21858 Gosal	1999 TY_{155}	Gosal	October 7, 1999	Socorro	LINEAR	KOR	6.2 km	MPC · JPL
21859	1999 TF_{172}	—	October 10, 1999	Socorro	LINEAR	·	3.6 km	MPC · JPL
21860 Joannaguy	1999 TX_{180}	Joannaguy	October 10, 1999	Socorro	LINEAR	·	4.8 km	MPC · JPL
21861 Maryhedberg	1999 TU_{189}	Maryhedberg	October 12, 1999	Socorro	LINEAR	EOS	4.7 km	MPC · JPL
21862 Joshuajones	1999 TV_{189}	Joshuajones	October 12, 1999	Socorro	LINEAR	EOS	5.0 km	MPC · JPL
21863	1999 TC_{194}	—	October 12, 1999	Socorro	LINEAR	·	12 km	MPC · JPL
21864	1999 TD_{238}	—	October 4, 1999	Catalina	CSS	·	2.5 km	MPC · JPL
21865	1999 TD_{246}	—	October 8, 1999	Catalina	CSS	EUN	5.2 km	MPC · JPL
21866	1999 TP_{247}	—	October 8, 1999	Catalina	CSS	·	2.3 km	MPC · JPL
21867	1999 TQ_{251}	—	October 9, 1999	Socorro	LINEAR	CYB	15 km	MPC · JPL
21868	1999 TK_{291}	—	October 10, 1999	Socorro	LINEAR	·	9.2 km	MPC · JPL
21869	1999 TE_{296}	—	October 1, 1999	Catalina	CSS	·	7.0 km	MPC · JPL
21870	1999 UD_{1}	—	October 16, 1999	Višnjan Observatory	K. Korlević	·	3.2 km	MPC · JPL
21871	1999 UK_{2}	—	October 17, 1999	Višnjan Observatory	K. Korlević	·	5.3 km	MPC · JPL
21872	1999 UP_{3}	—	October 18, 1999	Xinglong	SCAP	·	4.6 km	MPC · JPL
21873 Jindřichůvhradec	1999 UU_{3}	Jindřichůvhradec	October 29, 1999	Kleť	J. Tichá, M. Tichý	·	7.2 km	MPC · JPL
21874	1999 UB_{6}	—	October 18, 1999	Xinglong	SCAP	·	3.5 km	MPC · JPL
21875	1999 UD_{6}	—	October 22, 1999	Xinglong	SCAP	·	9.5 km	MPC · JPL
21876	1999 UL_{9}	—	October 29, 1999	Catalina	CSS	·	5.4 km	MPC · JPL
21877	1999 UL_{12}	—	October 31, 1999	Kitt Peak	Spacewatch	NYS	2.3 km	MPC · JPL
21878	1999 UF_{13}	—	October 29, 1999	Catalina	CSS	EOS	9.7 km	MPC · JPL
21879	1999 UH_{13}	—	October 29, 1999	Catalina	CSS	·	3.7 km	MPC · JPL
21880	1999 UF_{14}	—	October 29, 1999	Catalina	CSS	·	3.9 km	MPC · JPL
21881	1999 UK_{15}	—	October 29, 1999	Catalina	CSS	·	3.8 km	MPC · JPL
21882	1999 UL_{16}	—	October 29, 1999	Catalina	CSS	NYS	3.4 km	MPC · JPL
21883	1999 UC_{25}	—	October 28, 1999	Catalina	CSS	V	2.7 km	MPC · JPL
21884	1999 UO_{26}	—	October 30, 1999	Catalina	CSS	·	3.7 km	MPC · JPL
21885	1999 UY_{27}	—	October 30, 1999	Kitt Peak	Spacewatch	(21885)	8.8 km	MPC · JPL
21886	1999 UZ_{35}	—	October 31, 1999	Kitt Peak	Spacewatch	MIS	4.4 km	MPC · JPL
21887 Dipippo	1999 UH_{42}	Dipippo	October 20, 1999	Anderson Mesa	LONEOS	EOS	7.6 km	MPC · JPL
21888 Ďurech	1999 UL_{44}	Ďurech	October 29, 1999	Anderson Mesa	LONEOS	·	10 km	MPC · JPL
21889	1999 UJ_{47}	—	October 29, 1999	Kitt Peak	Spacewatch	·	7.4 km	MPC · JPL
21890	1999 UG_{50}	—	October 30, 1999	Catalina	CSS	EOS	5.1 km	MPC · JPL
21891 Andreabocelli	1999 VZ_{2}	Andreabocelli	November 1, 1999	Monte Agliale	S. Donati	V	2.9 km	MPC · JPL
21892	1999 VM_{3}	—	November 1, 1999	Kitt Peak	Spacewatch	THM	8.2 km	MPC · JPL
21893	1999 VL_{4}	—	November 1, 1999	Catalina	CSS	·	4.7 km	MPC · JPL
21894	1999 VQ_{4}	—	November 1, 1999	Catalina	CSS	MAR	4.4 km	MPC · JPL
21895	1999 VA_{5}	—	November 5, 1999	Višnjan Observatory	K. Korlević	·	11 km	MPC · JPL
21896	1999 VM_{6}	—	November 7, 1999	Oohira	T. Urata	·	8.1 km	MPC · JPL
21897	1999 VG_{7}	—	November 7, 1999	Višnjan Observatory	K. Korlević	AST	6.7 km	MPC · JPL
21898	1999 VJ_{7}	—	November 7, 1999	Višnjan Observatory	K. Korlević	·	13 km	MPC · JPL
21899	1999 VU_{8}	—	November 8, 1999	Fountain Hills	C. W. Juels	·	5.4 km	MPC · JPL
21900 Orus	1999 VQ_{10}	Orus	November 9, 1999	Oizumi	T. Kobayashi	L4	51 km	MPC · JPL

== 21901–22000 ==
back to top

Designation			Discovery			Properties		Ref
Permanent	Provisional	Named after	Date	Site	Discoverer(s)	Category	Diam.	Ref
21901	1999 VZ_{11}	—	November 10, 1999	Fountain Hills	C. W. Juels	·	6.4 km	MPC · JPL
21902	1999 VD_{12}	—	November 10, 1999	Fountain Hills	C. W. Juels	·	11 km	MPC · JPL
21903 Wallace	1999 VE_{12}	Wallace	November 10, 1999	Fountain Hills	C. W. Juels	EOS	10 km	MPC · JPL
21904	1999 VV_{12}	—	November 11, 1999	Fountain Hills	C. W. Juels	·	15 km	MPC · JPL
21905	1999 VX_{14}	—	November 2, 1999	Kitt Peak	Spacewatch	·	2.1 km	MPC · JPL
21906	1999 VH_{20}	—	November 11, 1999	Fountain Hills	C. W. Juels	·	5.2 km	MPC · JPL
21907	1999 VM_{20}	—	November 11, 1999	Fountain Hills	C. W. Juels	EUN	6.6 km	MPC · JPL
21908	1999 VQ_{21}	—	November 12, 1999	Višnjan Observatory	K. Korlević	NYS	2.2 km	MPC · JPL
21909	1999 VR_{21}	—	November 12, 1999	Višnjan Observatory	K. Korlević	·	4.4 km	MPC · JPL
21910	1999 VT_{23}	—	November 14, 1999	Fountain Hills	C. W. Juels	·	5.7 km	MPC · JPL
21911	1999 VW_{23}	—	November 14, 1999	Fountain Hills	C. W. Juels	GEF	6.4 km	MPC · JPL
21912	1999 VL_{24}	—	November 15, 1999	Fountain Hills	C. W. Juels	EUN	5.9 km	MPC · JPL
21913 Taylorjones	1999 VK_{28}	Taylorjones	November 3, 1999	Socorro	LINEAR	·	3.6 km	MPC · JPL
21914 Melakabinoff	1999 VX_{34}	Melakabinoff	November 3, 1999	Socorro	LINEAR	·	3.5 km	MPC · JPL
21915 Lavins	1999 VE_{35}	Lavins	November 3, 1999	Socorro	LINEAR	·	4.6 km	MPC · JPL
21916	1999 VU_{37}	—	November 3, 1999	Socorro	LINEAR	V	3.2 km	MPC · JPL
21917	1999 VY_{37}	—	November 3, 1999	Socorro	LINEAR	·	7.6 km	MPC · JPL
21918	1999 VN_{45}	—	November 4, 1999	Catalina	CSS	·	4.1 km	MPC · JPL
21919 Luga	1999 VV_{47}	Luga	November 3, 1999	Socorro	LINEAR	EOS	6.4 km	MPC · JPL
21920	1999 VZ_{47}	—	November 3, 1999	Socorro	LINEAR	·	7.7 km	MPC · JPL
21921 Camdenmiller	1999 VE_{49}	Camdenmiller	November 3, 1999	Socorro	LINEAR	·	4.2 km	MPC · JPL
21922 Mocz	1999 VK_{49}	Mocz	November 3, 1999	Socorro	LINEAR	·	3.7 km	MPC · JPL
21923	1999 VT_{52}	—	November 3, 1999	Socorro	LINEAR	EUN	8.4 km	MPC · JPL
21924 Alyssaovaitt	1999 VN_{53}	Alyssaovaitt	November 4, 1999	Socorro	LINEAR	·	3.3 km	MPC · JPL
21925 Supasternak	1999 VW_{53}	Supasternak	November 4, 1999	Socorro	LINEAR	·	3.8 km	MPC · JPL
21926 Jacobperry	1999 VH_{54}	Jacobperry	November 4, 1999	Socorro	LINEAR	·	6.4 km	MPC · JPL
21927 Sarahpierz	1999 VB_{55}	Sarahpierz	November 4, 1999	Socorro	LINEAR	·	5.6 km	MPC · JPL
21928 Prabakaran	1999 VX_{55}	Prabakaran	November 4, 1999	Socorro	LINEAR	·	5.9 km	MPC · JPL
21929 Nileshraval	1999 VP_{56}	Nileshraval	November 4, 1999	Socorro	LINEAR	·	5.2 km	MPC · JPL
21930	1999 VP_{61}	—	November 4, 1999	Socorro	LINEAR	3:2 · SHU	18 km	MPC · JPL
21931	1999 VB_{64}	—	November 4, 1999	Socorro	LINEAR	EUN	3.8 km	MPC · JPL
21932 Rios	1999 VP_{65}	Rios	November 4, 1999	Socorro	LINEAR	KOR	3.8 km	MPC · JPL
21933 Aaronrozon	1999 VL_{70}	Aaronrozon	November 4, 1999	Socorro	LINEAR	KOR	4.5 km	MPC · JPL
21934	1999 VY_{71}	—	November 7, 1999	Xinglong	SCAP	·	6.9 km	MPC · JPL
21935	1999 VZ_{77}	—	November 4, 1999	Socorro	LINEAR	·	5.0 km	MPC · JPL
21936 Ryan	1999 VH_{79}	Ryan	November 4, 1999	Socorro	LINEAR	·	2.2 km	MPC · JPL
21937 Basheehan	1999 VV_{80}	Basheehan	November 4, 1999	Socorro	LINEAR	KOR	3.9 km	MPC · JPL
21938	1999 VE_{81}	—	November 4, 1999	Socorro	LINEAR	·	3.2 km	MPC · JPL
21939 Kasmith	1999 VJ_{89}	Kasmith	November 4, 1999	Socorro	LINEAR	KOR	3.4 km	MPC · JPL
21940	1999 VU_{91}	—	November 7, 1999	Socorro	LINEAR	·	3.1 km	MPC · JPL
21941	1999 VU_{92}	—	November 9, 1999	Socorro	LINEAR	·	3.0 km	MPC · JPL
21942 Subramanian	1999 VN_{106}	Subramanian	November 9, 1999	Socorro	LINEAR	fast	5.3 km	MPC · JPL
21943 Diannacowern	1999 VG_{114}	Diannacowern	November 9, 1999	Catalina	CSS	·	8.9 km	MPC · JPL
21944	1999 VA_{118}	—	November 9, 1999	Kitt Peak	Spacewatch	ADE	5.7 km	MPC · JPL
21945 Kleshchonok	1999 VL_{135}	Kleshchonok	November 13, 1999	Anderson Mesa	LONEOS	·	3.2 km	MPC · JPL
21946	1999 VD_{138}	—	November 9, 1999	Catalina	CSS	fast?	4.7 km	MPC · JPL
21947	1999 VG_{141}	—	November 10, 1999	Kitt Peak	Spacewatch	KOR	3.5 km	MPC · JPL
21948	1999 VY_{149}	—	November 14, 1999	Socorro	LINEAR	·	2.3 km	MPC · JPL
21949 Tatulian	1999 VA_{156}	Tatulian	November 12, 1999	Socorro	LINEAR	·	3.7 km	MPC · JPL
21950	1999 VS_{158}	—	November 14, 1999	Socorro	LINEAR	·	8.6 km	MPC · JPL
21951	1999 VE_{159}	—	November 14, 1999	Socorro	LINEAR	·	8.2 km	MPC · JPL
21952 Terry	1999 VD_{165}	Terry	November 14, 1999	Socorro	LINEAR	·	3.5 km	MPC · JPL
21953	1999 VB_{176}	—	November 2, 1999	Catalina	CSS	NEM	6.2 km	MPC · JPL
21954	1999 VU_{178}	—	November 6, 1999	Socorro	LINEAR	slow	8.7 km	MPC · JPL
21955	1999 VW_{178}	—	November 6, 1999	Socorro	LINEAR	·	4.9 km	MPC · JPL
21956 Thangada	1999 VE_{179}	Thangada	November 6, 1999	Socorro	LINEAR	GEF	4.2 km	MPC · JPL
21957	1999 VU_{179}	—	November 6, 1999	Socorro	LINEAR	·	8.2 km	MPC · JPL
21958 Tripuraneni	1999 VU_{185}	Tripuraneni	November 15, 1999	Socorro	LINEAR	·	4.0 km	MPC · JPL
21959	1999 VM_{186}	—	November 15, 1999	Socorro	LINEAR	·	14 km	MPC · JPL
21960	1999 VH_{189}	—	November 15, 1999	Socorro	LINEAR	·	4.2 km	MPC · JPL
21961	1999 VE_{203}	—	November 8, 1999	Catalina	CSS	EOS	8.8 km	MPC · JPL
21962 Scottsandford	1999 VS_{203}	Scottsandford	November 9, 1999	Anderson Mesa	LONEOS	GEF	4.1 km	MPC · JPL
21963	1999 VP_{207}	—	November 13, 1999	Catalina	CSS	·	10 km	MPC · JPL
21964 Kevinhousen	1999 VK_{213}	Kevinhousen	November 13, 1999	Anderson Mesa	LONEOS	·	8.0 km	MPC · JPL
21965 Dones	1999 VO_{213}	Dones	November 13, 1999	Anderson Mesa	LONEOS	·	5.4 km	MPC · JPL
21966 Hamadori	1999 WJ_{9}	Hamadori	November 27, 1999	Anderson Mesa	LONEOS	·	3.1 km	MPC · JPL
21967	1999 WS_{9}	—	November 30, 1999	Oizumi	T. Kobayashi	·	20 km	MPC · JPL
21968	1999 WE_{10}	—	November 30, 1999	Oizumi	T. Kobayashi	·	4.7 km	MPC · JPL
21969	1999 WJ_{17}	—	November 30, 1999	Kitt Peak	Spacewatch	V	2.4 km	MPC · JPL
21970 Tyle	1999 XC	Tyle	December 1, 1999	Socorro	LINEAR	·	3.7 km	MPC · JPL
21971	1999 XG	—	December 1, 1999	Socorro	LINEAR	ADE	8.2 km	MPC · JPL
21972	1999 XU	—	December 2, 1999	Socorro	LINEAR	·	4.6 km	MPC · JPL
21973	1999 XP_{1}	—	December 2, 1999	Socorro	LINEAR	slow	4.4 km	MPC · JPL
21974	1999 XV_{1}	—	December 3, 1999	Fountain Hills	C. W. Juels	·	5.2 km	MPC · JPL
21975	1999 XR_{2}	—	December 4, 1999	Fountain Hills	C. W. Juels	·	3.5 km	MPC · JPL
21976	1999 XV_{2}	—	December 4, 1999	Fountain Hills	C. W. Juels	·	8.5 km	MPC · JPL
21977	1999 XW_{2}	—	December 4, 1999	Fountain Hills	C. W. Juels	·	5.4 km	MPC · JPL
21978	1999 XW_{3}	—	December 4, 1999	Catalina	CSS	·	6.9 km	MPC · JPL
21979	1999 XQ_{4}	—	December 4, 1999	Catalina	CSS	·	4.0 km	MPC · JPL
21980	1999 XA_{5}	—	December 4, 1999	Catalina	CSS	·	3.6 km	MPC · JPL
21981	1999 XX_{5}	—	December 4, 1999	Catalina	CSS	MRX	5.4 km	MPC · JPL
21982	1999 XL_{8}	—	December 4, 1999	Gekko	T. Kagawa	fast?	6.4 km	MPC · JPL
21983	1999 XB_{12}	—	December 6, 1999	Catalina	CSS	EUN	4.9 km	MPC · JPL
21984	1999 XC_{12}	—	December 6, 1999	Catalina	CSS	·	8.0 km	MPC · JPL
21985 Šejna	1999 XG_{15}	Šejna	December 2, 1999	Ondřejov	L. Kotková	THM	6.5 km	MPC · JPL
21986 Alexanduribe	1999 XO_{17}	Alexanduribe	December 2, 1999	Socorro	LINEAR	V	3.1 km	MPC · JPL
21987	1999 XH_{18}	—	December 3, 1999	Socorro	LINEAR	·	4.1 km	MPC · JPL
21988	1999 XQ_{20}	—	December 5, 1999	Socorro	LINEAR	EOS	5.1 km	MPC · JPL
21989 Werntz	1999 XU_{20}	Werntz	December 5, 1999	Socorro	LINEAR	·	4.1 km	MPC · JPL
21990 Garretyazzie	1999 XH_{22}	Garretyazzie	December 6, 1999	Socorro	LINEAR	KOR	4.8 km	MPC · JPL
21991 Zane	1999 XM_{23}	Zane	December 6, 1999	Socorro	LINEAR	KOR	4.0 km	MPC · JPL
21992	1999 XZ_{23}	—	December 6, 1999	Socorro	LINEAR	·	3.7 km	MPC · JPL
21993	1999 XH_{26}	—	December 6, 1999	Socorro	LINEAR	KOR	4.0 km	MPC · JPL
21994	1999 XU_{26}	—	December 6, 1999	Socorro	LINEAR	·	2.1 km	MPC · JPL
21995	1999 XL_{29}	—	December 6, 1999	Socorro	LINEAR	·	4.2 km	MPC · JPL
21996	1999 XP_{31}	—	December 6, 1999	Socorro	LINEAR	MAR	6.8 km	MPC · JPL
21997	1999 XP_{36}	—	December 7, 1999	Fountain Hills	C. W. Juels	·	6.0 km	MPC · JPL
21998	1999 XH_{37}	—	December 7, 1999	Fountain Hills	C. W. Juels	MAR	5.5 km	MPC · JPL
21999 Disora	1999 XS_{38}	Disora	December 7, 1999	Campo Catino	F. Mallia	·	5.5 km	MPC · JPL
22000	1999 XF_{40}	—	December 7, 1999	Socorro	LINEAR	·	9.8 km	MPC · JPL

back to top

== See also ==
- Meanings of minor-planet names: 21001–22000
