= 21501 Acevedo =

Main-belt asteroid

Discovery
- Discovered by: LONEOS
- Discovery site: Anderson Mesa Stn.
- Discovery date: 23 May 1998

Designations
- Named after: Tony Acevedo (Arecibo staff member)
- Alternative designations: 1998 KC_{8} · 1978 WY_{19} 1998 HV_{149}
- Minor planet category: main-belt · Flora

Orbital characteristics
- Epoch 4 September 2017 (JD 2458000.5)
- Uncertainty parameter 0
- Observation arc: 37.68 yr (13,762 days)
- Aphelion: 2.4807 AU
- Perihelion: 2.1490 AU
- Semi-major axis: 2.3149 AU
- Eccentricity: 0.0716
- Orbital period (sidereal): 3.52 yr (1,286 days)
- Mean anomaly: 283.45°
- Mean motion: 0° 16^{m} 47.28^{s} / day
- Inclination: 5.5859°
- Longitude of ascending node: 261.50°
- Argument of perihelion: 219.13°

Physical characteristics
- Dimensions: 2.41 km (calculated)
- Synodic rotation period: 6.5689±0.0050 h
- Geometric albedo: 0.24 (assumed)
- Spectral type: S
- Absolute magnitude (H): 14.803±0.003 (R) · 14.9 · 15.16±0.24 · 15.25

21501 Acevedo (provisional designation 1998 KC_{8}) is a stony Florian asteroid from the inner regions of the asteroid belt, approximately 2.4 kilometers in diameter.

The asteroid was discovered on 23 May 1998, by the LONEOS team at Anderson Mesa Station in Arizona, United States. It was named for Tony Acevedo, staff member at the Arecibo Observatory in Puerto Rico.

== Orbit and classification ==
Acevedo is a member of the Flora family, one of the largest families of stony asteroids. It orbits the Sun in the inner main-belt at a distance of 2.1–2.5 AU once every 3 years and 6 months (1,286 days). Its orbit has an eccentricity of 0.07 and an inclination of 6° with respect to the ecliptic.

The body's observation arc begins almost 20 years prior to its official discovery observation, with a precovery taken at Palomar Observatory in November 1978.

== Physical characteristics ==
Acevedo has been characterized as a common S-type asteroid by Pan-STARRS photometric survey.

=== Lightcurve ===
In August 2013, a fragmentary rotational lightcurve of Acevedo was obtained from photometric observations by astronomers at the Palomar Transient Factory in California. Lightcurve analysis gave a provisional rotation period of 6.5689 hours with a brightness amplitude of 0.10 magnitude (U=1).

=== Diameter and albedo estimate ===
The Collaborative Asteroid Lightcurve Link assumes an albedo of 0.24 – which derives from 8 Flora, the largest member and namesake of this orbital family – and calculates a diameter of 2.4 kilometers with an absolute magnitude of 15.25.

== Naming ==
This minor planet was named in honour of Tony Acevedo (born 1950), staff member at the Arecibo Observatory in Puerto Rico, working as multimedia graphic designer and media officer. The approved naming citation was published by the Minor Planet Center on 18 July 2008 (M.P.C. 63393).
