= 21558 Alisonliu =

Asteroid

Discovery
- Discovered by: LINEAR
- Discovery site: Lincoln Laboratory ETS
- Discovery date: 24 August 1998

Designations
- Named after: Alison W. Lui (2006 ISEF awardee)
- Alternative designations: 1998 QW_{77} · 1992 CX
- Minor planet category: main-belt · Eunomia

Orbital characteristics
- Epoch 4 September 2017 (JD 2458000.5)
- Uncertainty parameter 0
- Observation arc: 25.04 yr (9,147 days)
- Aphelion: 3.1122 AU
- Perihelion: 2.2357 AU
- Semi-major axis: 2.6740 AU
- Eccentricity: 0.1639
- Orbital period (sidereal): 4.37 yr (1,597 days)
- Mean anomaly: 209.51°
- Mean motion: 0° 13^{m} 31.44^{s} / day
- Inclination: 11.958°
- Longitude of ascending node: 323.45°
- Argument of perihelion: 288.46°

Physical characteristics
- Dimensions: 6.670±0.581 km 8.36 km (calculated); 8.812±0.068 km
- Synodic rotation period: 4.866±0.003 h
- Geometric albedo: 0.21 (assumed); 0.2287±0.0326; 0.245±0.050
- Spectral type: S
- Absolute magnitude (H): 12.5 · 12.7 · 12.83±0.25

21558 Alisonliu (provisional designation 1998 QW_{77}) is a stony Eunomia asteroid from the middle region of the asteroid belt, approximately 8 kilometers in diameter. It was discovered on 24 August 1998, by the Lincoln Near-Earth Asteroid Research at the Lincoln Laboratory's Experimental Test Site in Socorro, New Mexico, United States. The asteroid was named for Alison Liu, a 2006 ISEF awardee.

== Orbit and classification ==
Alisonliu is a member of the Eunomia family, a large group of stony asteroids and the most prominent family in the intermediate main-belt. It orbits the Sun in the central main-belt at a distance of 2.2–3.1 AU once every 4 years and 4 months (1,597 days). Its orbit has an eccentricity of 0.16 and an inclination of 12° with respect to the ecliptic.

The body's observation arc begins 6 years prior to its official discovery observation, with its first identification as 1992 CX at the Venezuelan OAN de Llano del Hato in 1992.

== Physical characteristics ==
Alisonliu has been characterized as a stony S-type asteroid by Pan-STARRS photometric survey.

=== Lightcurve ===
A rotational lightcurve of Alisonliu was obtained from photometric observations made at the Australian Oakley Southern Sky Observatory (E09) in April 2010. Lightcurve analysis gave a well-defined rotation period of 4.866 hours with a brightness variation of 0.12 magnitude (U=3).

=== Diameter and albedo ===
According to the survey carried out by the NEOWISE mission of NASA's space-based Wide-field Infrared Survey Explorer, Alisonliu measures 6.7 and 8.8 kilometers in diameter, and its surface has an albedo of 0.229 and 0.245, respectively, while the Collaborative Asteroid Lightcurve Link assumes an albedo of 0.21 and calculates a diameter of 8.4 kilometers with an absolute magnitude of 12.7.

== Naming ==
This minor planet was named after Alison Liu (born 1989) who was awarded Intel Best of Category in the 2006 Intel International Science and Engineering Fair (ISEF) for her behavioral and social science team project. In addition, she received the EU Contest for Young Scientists Award. At the time, Liu attended the Manhasset Secondary School in the U.S. state of New York. The approved naming citation was published by the Minor Planet Center on 11 July 2006 (M.P.C. 57276).
