= 21436 Chaoyichi =

Main-belt asteroid binary

Discovery
- Discovered by: LINEAR
- Discovery site: Lincoln Lab ETS
- Discovery date: 31 March 1998

Designations
- Alternative designations: 1998 FL_{116}
- Minor planet category: main-belt · background

Orbital characteristics
- Epoch 13 January 2016 (JD 2457400.5)
- Uncertainty parameter 0
- Observation arc: 9565 days (26.19 yr)
- Aphelion: 2.3725454 AU (354.92774 Gm)
- Perihelion: 2.0008870 AU (299.32843 Gm)
- Semi-major axis: 2.186716 AU (327.1281 Gm)
- Eccentricity: 0.0849810
- Orbital period (sidereal): 3.23 yr (1181.1 d)
- Mean anomaly: 226.1171°
- Mean motion: 0° 18^{m} 17.281^{s} / day
- Inclination: 3.736916°
- Longitude of ascending node: 320.37494°
- Argument of perihelion: 178.30874°
- Known satellites: 1

Physical characteristics
- Mean diameter: 1.953±0.256 km
- Synodic rotation period: 2.87 h
- Geometric albedo: 0.222±0.062
- Absolute magnitude (H): 15.4

21436 Chaoyichi (provisional designation 1998 FL_{116}) is a background asteroid and binary system from the inner region of the asteroid belt, approximately 2 kilometers in diameter. It was discovered on 31 March 1998, by astronomers of the Lincoln Near-Earth Asteroid Research at Lincoln Laboratory's Experimental Test Site near Socorro, New Mexico, United States.
