= List of minor planets: 17001–18000 =

The following is a partial list of minor planets, running from minor-planet number 17001 through 18000, inclusive. The primary data for this and other partial lists is based on JPL's "Small-Body Orbital Elements" and data available from the Minor Planet Center. Critical list information is also provided by the MPC, unless otherwise specified from Lowell Observatory. A detailed description of the table's columns and additional sources are given on the main page including a complete list of every page in this series, and a statistical break-up on the dynamical classification of minor planets.

Also see the summary list of all named bodies in numerical and alphabetical order, and the corresponding naming citations for the number range of this particular list. New namings may only be added to this list after official publication, as the preannouncement of names is condemned by the Working Group for Small Bodies Nomenclature of the International Astronomical Union.

Near-Earth obj.	MBA (inner)	MBA (outer)	Centaur
Mars-crosser	MBA (middle)	Jupiter trojan	Trans-Neptunian obj.
Unclassified

== 17001–17100 ==
Designation			Discovery			Properties		Ref
Permanent	Provisional	Named after	Date	Site	Discoverer(s)	Category	Diam.	Ref
17001 Braydennoh	1999 CT_{54}	Braydennoh	February 10, 1999	Socorro	LINEAR	·	4.1 km	MPC · JPL
17002 Kouzel	1999 CV_{54}	Kouzel	February 10, 1999	Socorro	LINEAR	NYS	2.1 km	MPC · JPL
17003 Poojanpandya	1999 CE_{55}	Poojanpandya	February 10, 1999	Socorro	LINEAR	MAR	4.8 km	MPC · JPL
17004 Sinkevich	1999 CR_{61}	Sinkevich	February 12, 1999	Socorro	LINEAR	·	2.9 km	MPC · JPL
17005	1999 CD_{63}	—	February 12, 1999	Socorro	LINEAR	GEF · fast	5.2 km	MPC · JPL
17006	1999 CH_{63}	—	February 12, 1999	Socorro	LINEAR	EUN	6.5 km	MPC · JPL
17007	1999 CK_{65}	—	February 12, 1999	Socorro	LINEAR	PHO	3.4 km	MPC · JPL
17008 Anamariaperez	1999 CL_{65}	Anamariaperez	February 12, 1999	Socorro	LINEAR	TEL	5.9 km	MPC · JPL
17009 Jasonping	1999 CM_{70}	Jasonping	February 12, 1999	Socorro	LINEAR	·	4.9 km	MPC · JPL
17010	1999 CQ_{72}	—	February 12, 1999	Socorro	LINEAR	·	6.2 km	MPC · JPL
17011	1999 CC_{80}	—	February 12, 1999	Socorro	LINEAR	EOS	9.5 km	MPC · JPL
17012	1999 CY_{80}	—	February 12, 1999	Socorro	LINEAR	EUN	5.7 km	MPC · JPL
17013	1999 CA_{82}	—	February 12, 1999	Socorro	LINEAR	·	9.3 km	MPC · JPL
17014 Melaniequan	1999 CY_{96}	Melaniequan	February 10, 1999	Socorro	LINEAR	AGN	4.2 km	MPC · JPL
17015 Shriyareddy	1999 CN_{117}	Shriyareddy	February 12, 1999	Socorro	LINEAR	·	3.9 km	MPC · JPL
17016	1999 CV_{123}	—	February 11, 1999	Socorro	LINEAR	EUN	6.6 km	MPC · JPL
17017	1999 CJ_{138}	—	February 11, 1999	Kitt Peak	Spacewatch	·	3.1 km	MPC · JPL
17018	1999 DB_{1}	—	February 18, 1999	Haleakala	NEAT	·	2.9 km	MPC · JPL
17019 Aldo	1999 DV_{3}	Aldo	February 23, 1999	Montelupo	M. Tombelli, G. Forti	EUN	7.3 km	MPC · JPL
17020 Hopemeraengus	1999 DH_{4}	Hopemeraengus	February 24, 1999	Cocoa	I. P. Griffin	GEF	5.5 km	MPC · JPL
17021	1999 DS_{6}	—	February 20, 1999	Socorro	LINEAR	·	10 km	MPC · JPL
17022 Huisjen	1999 DN_{7}	Huisjen	February 18, 1999	Anderson Mesa	LONEOS	·	8.4 km	MPC · JPL
17023 Abbott	1999 EG	Abbott	March 7, 1999	Reedy Creek	J. Broughton	NYS	2.8 km	MPC · JPL
17024 Costello	1999 EJ_{5}	Costello	March 15, 1999	Reedy Creek	J. Broughton	·	3.7 km	MPC · JPL
17025 Pilachowski	1999 ES_{5}	Pilachowski	March 13, 1999	Goodricke-Pigott	R. A. Tucker	RAF	4.0 km	MPC · JPL
17026	1999 EC_{8}	—	March 12, 1999	Kitt Peak	Spacewatch	·	4.3 km	MPC · JPL
17027	1999 EF_{12}	—	March 15, 1999	Socorro	LINEAR	·	9.8 km	MPC · JPL
17028 Frankstadermann	1999 FJ_{5}	Frankstadermann	March 18, 1999	Kitt Peak	Spacewatch	·	2.0 km	MPC · JPL
17029 Cuillandre	1999 FM_{6}	Cuillandre	March 17, 1999	Caussols	ODAS	KOR	6.3 km	MPC · JPL
17030 Sierks	1999 FC_{9}	Sierks	March 19, 1999	Anderson Mesa	LONEOS	slow	10 km	MPC · JPL
17031 Piethut	1999 FL_{9}	Piethut	March 22, 1999	Anderson Mesa	LONEOS	·	4.6 km	MPC · JPL
17032 Edlu	1999 FM_{9}	Edlu	March 22, 1999	Anderson Mesa	LONEOS	·	7.3 km	MPC · JPL
17033 Rusty	1999 FR_{9}	Rusty	March 22, 1999	Anderson Mesa	LONEOS	·	2.5 km	MPC · JPL
17034 Vasylshev	1999 FS_{9}	Vasylshev	March 22, 1999	Anderson Mesa	LONEOS	·	6.6 km	MPC · JPL
17035 Velichko	1999 FC_{10}	Velichko	March 22, 1999	Anderson Mesa	LONEOS	V	4.8 km	MPC · JPL
17036 Krugly	1999 FD_{10}	Krugly	March 22, 1999	Anderson Mesa	LONEOS	·	2.9 km	MPC · JPL
17037 Danfleisch	1999 FV_{10}	Danfleisch	March 16, 1999	Kitt Peak	Spacewatch	·	3.8 km	MPC · JPL
17038 Wake	1999 FO_{21}	Wake	March 26, 1999	Reedy Creek	J. Broughton	·	4.1 km	MPC · JPL
17039 Yeuseyenka	1999 FN_{26}	Yeuseyenka	March 19, 1999	Socorro	LINEAR	·	10 km	MPC · JPL
17040 Almeida	1999 FT_{27}	Almeida	March 19, 1999	Socorro	LINEAR	·	7.8 km	MPC · JPL
17041 Castagna	1999 FB_{30}	Castagna	March 19, 1999	Socorro	LINEAR	·	2.3 km	MPC · JPL
17042 Madiraju	1999 FG_{30}	Madiraju	March 19, 1999	Socorro	LINEAR	·	6.4 km	MPC · JPL
17043 Santucci	1999 FJ_{30}	Santucci	March 19, 1999	Socorro	LINEAR	·	3.7 km	MPC · JPL
17044 Mubdirahman	1999 FZ_{30}	Mubdirahman	March 19, 1999	Socorro	LINEAR	·	3.2 km	MPC · JPL
17045 Markert	1999 FV_{32}	Markert	March 22, 1999	Mauna Kea	D. J. Tholen	·	2.9 km	MPC · JPL
17046 Kenway	1999 FM_{33}	Kenway	March 19, 1999	Socorro	LINEAR	·	7.7 km	MPC · JPL
17047 Tateschrock	1999 FP_{33}	Tateschrock	March 19, 1999	Socorro	LINEAR	EOS	5.9 km	MPC · JPL
17048 Nicolesegaran	1999 FD_{34}	Nicolesegaran	March 19, 1999	Socorro	LINEAR	·	2.9 km	MPC · JPL
17049 Miron	1999 FJ_{34}	Miron	March 19, 1999	Socorro	LINEAR	·	3.7 km	MPC · JPL
17050 Weiskopf	1999 FX_{45}	Weiskopf	March 20, 1999	Socorro	LINEAR	·	3.0 km	MPC · JPL
17051 Oflynn	1999 FW_{46}	Oflynn	March 20, 1999	Socorro	LINEAR	V	3.8 km	MPC · JPL
17052 Senthilvel	1999 FS_{51}	Senthilvel	March 20, 1999	Socorro	LINEAR	·	6.8 km	MPC · JPL
17053 Ashayshah	1999 FX_{56}	Ashayshah	March 20, 1999	Socorro	LINEAR	KOR	6.1 km	MPC · JPL
17054	1999 GL_{2}	—	April 6, 1999	Višnjan Observatory	K. Korlević	KOR	6.8 km	MPC · JPL
17055	1999 GP_{3}	—	April 6, 1999	King City, Ontario Observatory	Sandness, R. G.	MAR · slow	3.6 km	MPC · JPL
17056 Boschetti	1999 GW_{3}	Boschetti	April 6, 1999	San Marcello	L. Tesi, A. Boattini	·	2.9 km	MPC · JPL
17057	1999 GS_{4}	—	April 10, 1999	Višnjan Observatory	K. Korlević	·	4.5 km	MPC · JPL
17058 Rocknroll	1999 GA_{5}	Rocknroll	April 13, 1999	Reedy Creek	J. Broughton	MAR	5.5 km	MPC · JPL
17059 Elvis	1999 GX_{5}	Elvis	April 15, 1999	Reedy Creek	J. Broughton	·	4.0 km	MPC · JPL
17060 Mikecombi	1999 GX_{7}	Mikecombi	April 9, 1999	Anderson Mesa	LONEOS	EUN	5.2 km	MPC · JPL
17061 Tegler	1999 GQ_{8}	Tegler	April 10, 1999	Anderson Mesa	LONEOS	·	3.7 km	MPC · JPL
17062 Bardot	1999 GR_{8}	Bardot	April 10, 1999	Anderson Mesa	LONEOS	·	11 km	MPC · JPL
17063 Papaloizou	1999 GP_{9}	Papaloizou	April 15, 1999	Anderson Mesa	LONEOS	·	4.5 km	MPC · JPL
17064 Ashnashah	1999 GX_{16}	Ashnashah	April 15, 1999	Socorro	LINEAR	V	3.8 km	MPC · JPL
17065 Shrilashah	1999 GK_{17}	Shrilashah	April 15, 1999	Socorro	LINEAR	·	7.4 km	MPC · JPL
17066 Ginagallant	1999 GG_{18}	Ginagallant	April 15, 1999	Socorro	LINEAR	·	5.2 km	MPC · JPL
17067	1999 GF_{19}	—	April 15, 1999	Socorro	LINEAR	EOS	6.3 km	MPC · JPL
17068	1999 GO_{19}	—	April 15, 1999	Socorro	LINEAR	·	6.7 km	MPC · JPL
17069 Adyantshankar	1999 GD_{20}	Adyantshankar	April 15, 1999	Socorro	LINEAR	·	4.5 km	MPC · JPL
17070 Yanniksingh	1999 GG_{20}	Yanniksingh	April 15, 1999	Socorro	LINEAR	·	5.1 km	MPC · JPL
17071 Spiride	1999 GK_{21}	Spiride	April 15, 1999	Socorro	LINEAR	·	4.3 km	MPC · JPL
17072 Athiviraham	1999 GT_{31}	Athiviraham	April 7, 1999	Socorro	LINEAR	·	2.4 km	MPC · JPL
17073 Alexblank	1999 GX_{34}	Alexblank	April 6, 1999	Socorro	LINEAR	·	4.7 km	MPC · JPL
17074 Shreshth	1999 GQ_{36}	Shreshth	April 12, 1999	Socorro	LINEAR	·	5.9 km	MPC · JPL
17075 Pankonin	1999 GF_{49}	Pankonin	April 9, 1999	Anderson Mesa	LONEOS	(2076)	3.2 km	MPC · JPL
17076 Betti	1999 HO	Betti	April 18, 1999	Prescott	P. G. Comba	V	2.4 km	MPC · JPL
17077 Pampaloni	1999 HY_{2}	Pampaloni	April 25, 1999	San Marcello	A. Boattini, M. Tombelli	·	4.0 km	MPC · JPL
17078 Sellers	1999 HD_{3}	Sellers	April 24, 1999	Reedy Creek	J. Broughton	·	10 km	MPC · JPL
17079 Lavrovsky	1999 HD_{9}	Lavrovsky	April 17, 1999	Socorro	LINEAR	V	2.8 km	MPC · JPL
17080	1999 HE_{9}	—	April 17, 1999	Socorro	LINEAR	EOS	7.2 km	MPC · JPL
17081 Jaytee	1999 JT_{1}	Jaytee	May 8, 1999	Catalina	CSS	moon	4.5 km	MPC · JPL
17082	1999 JC_{3}	—	May 9, 1999	Višnjan Observatory	K. Korlević	KOR	7.2 km	MPC · JPL
17083	1999 JB_{4}	—	May 10, 1999	Socorro	LINEAR	H	1.7 km	MPC · JPL
17084 Sundararajan	1999 JV_{14}	Sundararajan	May 10, 1999	Socorro	LINEAR	EOS	6.2 km	MPC · JPL
17085	1999 JM_{16}	—	May 15, 1999	Kitt Peak	Spacewatch	·	4.3 km	MPC · JPL
17086 Ruima	1999 JH_{18}	Ruima	May 10, 1999	Socorro	LINEAR	·	3.5 km	MPC · JPL
17087	1999 JC_{19}	—	May 10, 1999	Socorro	LINEAR	HYG	12 km	MPC · JPL
17088 Giupalazzolo	1999 JF_{19}	Giupalazzolo	May 10, 1999	Socorro	LINEAR	·	3.0 km	MPC · JPL
17089 Mercado	1999 JU_{19}	Mercado	May 10, 1999	Socorro	LINEAR	·	3.6 km	MPC · JPL
17090 Mundaca	1999 JE_{21}	Mundaca	May 10, 1999	Socorro	LINEAR	NYS	3.3 km	MPC · JPL
17091 Senthalir	1999 JM_{21}	Senthalir	May 10, 1999	Socorro	LINEAR	slow?	5.6 km	MPC · JPL
17092 Sharanya	1999 JP_{21}	Sharanya	May 10, 1999	Socorro	LINEAR	V	3.1 km	MPC · JPL
17093 Supanklang	1999 JH_{22}	Supanklang	May 10, 1999	Socorro	LINEAR	·	4.5 km	MPC · JPL
17094 Sarahsyed	1999 JV_{25}	Sarahsyed	May 10, 1999	Socorro	LINEAR	·	5.3 km	MPC · JPL
17095 Mahadik	1999 JN_{26}	Mahadik	May 10, 1999	Socorro	LINEAR	·	8.7 km	MPC · JPL
17096 Takemaru	1999 JX_{26}	Takemaru	May 10, 1999	Socorro	LINEAR	KOR	5.6 km	MPC · JPL
17097 Ronneuman	1999 JX_{31}	Ronneuman	May 10, 1999	Socorro	LINEAR	THM	8.0 km	MPC · JPL
17098 Ikedamai	1999 JE_{34}	Ikedamai	May 10, 1999	Socorro	LINEAR	·	3.8 km	MPC · JPL
17099 Emilytianshi	1999 JE_{37}	Emilytianshi	May 10, 1999	Socorro	LINEAR	·	5.1 km	MPC · JPL
17100 Kamiokanatsu	1999 JT_{37}	Kamiokanatsu	May 10, 1999	Socorro	LINEAR	·	11 km	MPC · JPL

== 17101–17200 ==
back to top

Designation			Discovery			Properties		Ref
Permanent	Provisional	Named after	Date	Site	Discoverer(s)	Category	Diam.	Ref
17101 Sakenova	1999 JZ_{38}	Sakenova	May 10, 1999	Socorro	LINEAR	·	3.2 km	MPC · JPL
17102 Begzhigitova	1999 JB_{41}	Begzhigitova	May 10, 1999	Socorro	LINEAR	·	2.2 km	MPC · JPL
17103 Kadyrsizova	1999 JC_{42}	Kadyrsizova	May 10, 1999	Socorro	LINEAR	KOR	4.9 km	MPC · JPL
17104 McCloskey	1999 JV_{46}	McCloskey	May 10, 1999	Socorro	LINEAR	THM	7.4 km	MPC · JPL
17105	1999 JC_{47}	—	May 10, 1999	Socorro	LINEAR	MAR	6.4 km	MPC · JPL
17106 Tidball	1999 JT_{48}	Tidball	May 10, 1999	Socorro	LINEAR	AGN	13 km	MPC · JPL
17107	1999 JJ_{51}	—	May 10, 1999	Socorro	LINEAR	KOR	7.1 km	MPC · JPL
17108 Patricorbett	1999 JL_{51}	Patricorbett	May 10, 1999	Socorro	LINEAR	KOR	3.6 km	MPC · JPL
17109	1999 JF_{52}	—	May 10, 1999	Socorro	LINEAR	GEF	27 km	MPC · JPL
17110	1999 JG_{52}	—	May 10, 1999	Socorro	LINEAR	EOS	7.4 km	MPC · JPL
17111	1999 JH_{52}	—	May 10, 1999	Socorro	LINEAR	EOS	13 km	MPC · JPL
17112	1999 JM_{52}	—	May 10, 1999	Socorro	LINEAR	GEF	7.2 km	MPC · JPL
17113	1999 JE_{54}	—	May 10, 1999	Socorro	LINEAR	THM	9.1 km	MPC · JPL
17114	1999 JJ_{54}	—	May 10, 1999	Socorro	LINEAR	(1298)	10 km	MPC · JPL
17115 Justiniano	1999 JT_{54}	Justiniano	May 10, 1999	Socorro	LINEAR	KOR	4.0 km	MPC · JPL
17116	1999 JO_{57}	—	May 10, 1999	Socorro	LINEAR	KOR	6.8 km	MPC · JPL
17117	1999 JL_{58}	—	May 10, 1999	Socorro	LINEAR	·	15 km	MPC · JPL
17118	1999 JM_{58}	—	May 10, 1999	Socorro	LINEAR	·	8.9 km	MPC · JPL
17119 Alexisrodrz	1999 JP_{59}	Alexisrodrz	May 10, 1999	Socorro	LINEAR	·	3.9 km	MPC · JPL
17120	1999 JP_{60}	—	May 10, 1999	Socorro	LINEAR	KOR	6.8 km	MPC · JPL
17121 Fernandonido	1999 JX_{60}	Fernandonido	May 10, 1999	Socorro	LINEAR	·	5.3 km	MPC · JPL
17122	1999 JH_{63}	—	May 10, 1999	Socorro	LINEAR	KOR · slow?	7.2 km	MPC · JPL
17123	1999 JQ_{63}	—	May 10, 1999	Socorro	LINEAR	EOS	6.3 km	MPC · JPL
17124 Rishavalera	1999 JC_{65}	Rishavalera	May 12, 1999	Socorro	LINEAR	·	4.3 km	MPC · JPL
17125 Vijayakumar	1999 JB_{68}	Vijayakumar	May 12, 1999	Socorro	LINEAR	PAD	7.4 km	MPC · JPL
17126 Sophiawang	1999 JH_{68}	Sophiawang	May 12, 1999	Socorro	LINEAR	·	7.1 km	MPC · JPL
17127 Ryanwestcott	1999 JE_{69}	Ryanwestcott	May 12, 1999	Socorro	LINEAR	EUN · slow	4.7 km	MPC · JPL
17128 Stephyoshida	1999 JS_{75}	Stephyoshida	May 10, 1999	Socorro	LINEAR	·	5.6 km	MPC · JPL
17129	1999 JM_{78}	—	May 13, 1999	Socorro	LINEAR	·	10 km	MPC · JPL
17130 Alexzhang	1999 JV_{79}	Alexzhang	May 13, 1999	Socorro	LINEAR	·	3.9 km	MPC · JPL
17131 Paulazhu	1999 JL_{80}	Paulazhu	May 12, 1999	Socorro	LINEAR	EOS	4.7 km	MPC · JPL
17132	1999 JV_{80}	—	May 12, 1999	Socorro	LINEAR	fast	10 km	MPC · JPL
17133	1999 JC_{81}	—	May 12, 1999	Socorro	LINEAR	EUN	7.7 km	MPC · JPL
17134	1999 JX_{81}	—	May 12, 1999	Socorro	LINEAR	·	7.6 km	MPC · JPL
17135	1999 JD_{82}	—	May 12, 1999	Socorro	LINEAR	EOS	9.3 km	MPC · JPL
17136	1999 JE_{82}	—	May 12, 1999	Socorro	LINEAR	slow	9.9 km	MPC · JPL
17137	1999 JK_{84}	—	May 12, 1999	Socorro	LINEAR	URS	15 km	MPC · JPL
17138 Burgosrosario	1999 JM_{84}	Burgosrosario	May 12, 1999	Socorro	LINEAR	slow	6.0 km	MPC · JPL
17139 Malyshev	1999 JS_{86}	Malyshev	May 12, 1999	Socorro	LINEAR	V	3.2 km	MPC · JPL
17140 Yangkevin	1999 JU_{86}	Yangkevin	May 12, 1999	Socorro	LINEAR	·	2.8 km	MPC · JPL
17141 Bhatia	1999 JV_{94}	Bhatia	May 12, 1999	Socorro	LINEAR	MAR	5.1 km	MPC · JPL
17142	1999 JQ_{95}	—	May 12, 1999	Socorro	LINEAR	·	4.5 km	MPC · JPL
17143 Andrewbrinton	1999 JN_{97}	Andrewbrinton	May 12, 1999	Socorro	LINEAR	EOS	6.1 km	MPC · JPL
17144 Laurenchen	1999 JW_{98}	Laurenchen	May 12, 1999	Socorro	LINEAR	·	5.9 km	MPC · JPL
17145 Hollycheng	1999 JG_{99}	Hollycheng	May 12, 1999	Socorro	LINEAR	·	6.4 km	MPC · JPL
17146	1999 JB_{102}	—	May 13, 1999	Socorro	LINEAR	·	11 km	MPC · JPL
17147 Mariafields	1999 JF_{102}	Mariafields	May 13, 1999	Socorro	LINEAR	KOR	5.4 km	MPC · JPL
17148 Arifirester	1999 JJ_{105}	Arifirester	May 12, 1999	Socorro	LINEAR	·	4.8 km	MPC · JPL
17149 Victoriagraf	1999 JM_{105}	Victoriagraf	May 13, 1999	Socorro	LINEAR	AGN · slow	4.8 km	MPC · JPL
17150	1999 JP_{109}	—	May 13, 1999	Socorro	LINEAR	THM	11 km	MPC · JPL
17151 Zanderhill	1999 JB_{114}	Zanderhill	May 13, 1999	Socorro	LINEAR	KOR	4.6 km	MPC · JPL
17152	1999 JA_{118}	—	May 13, 1999	Socorro	LINEAR	·	8.3 km	MPC · JPL
17153	1999 JK_{119}	—	May 13, 1999	Socorro	LINEAR	·	10 km	MPC · JPL
17154	1999 JS_{121}	—	May 13, 1999	Socorro	LINEAR	EOS	10 km	MPC · JPL
17155	1999 KZ_{1}	—	May 16, 1999	Kitt Peak	Spacewatch	·	5.2 km	MPC · JPL
17156 Kennethseitz	1999 KS_{3}	Kennethseitz	May 19, 1999	Kitt Peak	Spacewatch	·	16 km	MPC · JPL
17157	1999 KP_{6}	—	May 21, 1999	Xinglong	SCAP	MAR	6.4 km	MPC · JPL
17158	1999 KA_{8}	—	May 18, 1999	Socorro	LINEAR	EOS	7.4 km	MPC · JPL
17159	1999 KG_{15}	—	May 18, 1999	Socorro	LINEAR	TEL	7.2 km	MPC · JPL
17160 Jetly	1999 LT_{10}	Jetly	June 8, 1999	Socorro	LINEAR	·	5.9 km	MPC · JPL
17161	1999 LQ_{13}	—	June 9, 1999	Socorro	LINEAR	CYB	16 km	MPC · JPL
17162 Nithinkavi	1999 LX_{13}	Nithinkavi	June 9, 1999	Socorro	LINEAR	V	5.0 km	MPC · JPL
17163 Vasifedoseev	1999 LT_{19}	Vasifedoseev	June 9, 1999	Socorro	LINEAR	KOR ·	4.9 km	MPC · JPL
17164	1999 LP_{24}	—	June 9, 1999	Socorro	LINEAR	·	18 km	MPC · JPL
17165	1999 LS_{27}	—	June 9, 1999	Socorro	LINEAR	(1298)	12 km	MPC · JPL
17166 Secombe	1999 MC	Secombe	June 17, 1999	Reedy Creek	J. Broughton	·	11 km	MPC · JPL
17167 Olgarozanova	1999 NB	Olgarozanova	July 4, 1999	Kleť	J. Tichá, M. Tichý	NYS	10 km	MPC · JPL
17168	1999 NP_{3}	—	July 13, 1999	Socorro	LINEAR	·	6.7 km	MPC · JPL
17169 Tatarinov	1999 NQ_{23}	Tatarinov	July 14, 1999	Socorro	LINEAR	·	9.7 km	MPC · JPL
17170 Vsevustinov	1999 NS_{25}	Vsevustinov	July 14, 1999	Socorro	LINEAR	·	4.6 km	MPC · JPL
17171	1999 NB_{38}	—	July 14, 1999	Socorro	LINEAR	L5	41 km	MPC · JPL
17172	1999 NZ_{41}	—	July 14, 1999	Socorro	LINEAR	L5	34 km	MPC · JPL
17173 Evgenyamosov	1999 RN_{10}	Evgenyamosov	September 7, 1999	Socorro	LINEAR	MAS	3.6 km	MPC · JPL
17174 Krivitsky	1999 RX_{53}	Krivitsky	September 7, 1999	Socorro	LINEAR	·	4.9 km	MPC · JPL
17175	1999 SS_{3}	—	September 24, 1999	Socorro	LINEAR	·	18 km	MPC · JPL
17176 Viktorov	1999 SH_{17}	Viktorov	September 30, 1999	Socorro	LINEAR	·	3.7 km	MPC · JPL
17177	1999 TA_{41}	—	October 8, 1999	Catalina	CSS	·	10 km	MPC · JPL
17178 Caitlinrita	1999 TK_{218}	Caitlinrita	October 15, 1999	Socorro	LINEAR	·	8.6 km	MPC · JPL
17179 Codina	1999 TC_{224}	Codina	October 4, 1999	Anderson Mesa	LONEOS	EOS	7.8 km	MPC · JPL
17180 Rupertli	1999 TS_{291}	Rupertli	October 10, 1999	Socorro	LINEAR	EUN	5.0 km	MPC · JPL
17181	1999 UM_{3}	—	October 19, 1999	Socorro	LINEAR	APO +1km	1.6 km	MPC · JPL
17182	1999 VU	—	November 1, 1999	Socorro	LINEAR	APO +1km	2.9 km	MPC · JPL
17183	1999 VO_{2}	—	November 5, 1999	Catalina	CSS	·	10 km	MPC · JPL
17184 Carlrogers	1999 VL_{22}	Carlrogers	November 13, 1999	Fountain Hills	C. W. Juels	EOS	12 km	MPC · JPL
17185 Mcdavid	1999 VU_{23}	Mcdavid	November 14, 1999	Fountain Hills	C. W. Juels	·	6.3 km	MPC · JPL
17186 Sergivanov	1999 VP_{28}	Sergivanov	November 3, 1999	Socorro	LINEAR	NYS	3.6 km	MPC · JPL
17187	1999 VM_{72}	—	November 14, 1999	Xinglong	SCAP	·	6.8 km	MPC · JPL
17188	1999 WC_{2}	—	November 17, 1999	Socorro	LINEAR	APO +1km	1.8 km	MPC · JPL
17189	1999 WU_{3}	—	November 28, 1999	Oizumi	T. Kobayashi	·	4.5 km	MPC · JPL
17190 Retopezzoli	1999 WY_{8}	Retopezzoli	November 28, 1999	Gnosca	S. Sposetti	·	5.1 km	MPC · JPL
17191	1999 XS_{107}	—	December 4, 1999	Catalina	CSS	·	3.1 km	MPC · JPL
17192 Loharu	1999 XL_{172}	Loharu	December 10, 1999	Socorro	LINEAR	·	3.9 km	MPC · JPL
17193 Alexeybaran	1999 XC_{205}	Alexeybaran	December 12, 1999	Socorro	LINEAR	·	3.0 km	MPC · JPL
17194	1999 XA_{221}	—	December 14, 1999	Socorro	LINEAR	MAR	6.7 km	MPC · JPL
17195 Jimrichardson	1999 XQ_{234}	Jimrichardson	December 3, 1999	Anderson Mesa	LONEOS	HYG	6.2 km	MPC · JPL
17196 Mastrodemos	1999 XW_{234}	Mastrodemos	December 3, 1999	Anderson Mesa	LONEOS	·	7.1 km	MPC · JPL
17197 Matjazbone	2000 AC_{12}	Matjazbone	January 3, 2000	Socorro	LINEAR	·	5.2 km	MPC · JPL
17198 Gorjup	2000 AA_{31}	Gorjup	January 3, 2000	Socorro	LINEAR	·	2.8 km	MPC · JPL
17199 Jasonliu	2000 AT_{40}	Jasonliu	January 3, 2000	Socorro	LINEAR	EOS	7.3 km	MPC · JPL
17200	2000 AF_{47}	—	January 4, 2000	Socorro	LINEAR	·	3.3 km	MPC · JPL

== 17201–17300 ==
back to top

Designation			Discovery			Properties		Ref
Permanent	Provisional	Named after	Date	Site	Discoverer(s)	Category	Diam.	Ref
17201 Matjazhumar	2000 AJ_{58}	Matjazhumar	January 4, 2000	Socorro	LINEAR	·	6.5 km	MPC · JPL
17202	2000 AJ_{64}	—	January 4, 2000	Socorro	LINEAR	GEF	5.9 km	MPC · JPL
17203	2000 AM_{64}	—	January 4, 2000	Socorro	LINEAR	·	12 km	MPC · JPL
17204	2000 AR_{75}	—	January 5, 2000	Socorro	LINEAR	·	3.2 km	MPC · JPL
17205 McCreery	2000 AM_{105}	McCreery	January 5, 2000	Socorro	LINEAR	·	3.4 km	MPC · JPL
17206	2000 AJ_{125}	—	January 5, 2000	Socorro	LINEAR	·	14 km	MPC · JPL
17207	2000 AW_{126}	—	January 5, 2000	Socorro	LINEAR	EUN	7.2 km	MPC · JPL
17208 Pokrovska	2000 AH_{130}	Pokrovska	January 5, 2000	Socorro	LINEAR	·	3.1 km	MPC · JPL
17209	2000 AH_{148}	—	January 5, 2000	Socorro	LINEAR	EUN	7.1 km	MPC · JPL
17210 Nadinemeister	2000 AY_{172}	Nadinemeister	January 7, 2000	Socorro	LINEAR	·	10 km	MPC · JPL
17211 Brianfisher	2000 AY_{174}	Brianfisher	January 7, 2000	Socorro	LINEAR	·	4.2 km	MPC · JPL
17212	2000 AV_{183}	—	January 7, 2000	Socorro	LINEAR	T_{j} (2.98) · HIL · 3:2 · (6124)	14 km	MPC · JPL
17213	2000 AF_{186}	—	January 8, 2000	Socorro	LINEAR	·	16 km	MPC · JPL
17214 Neervannan	2000 AR_{189}	Neervannan	January 8, 2000	Socorro	LINEAR	·	5.3 km	MPC · JPL
17215 Slivan	2000 AG_{238}	Slivan	January 6, 2000	Anderson Mesa	LONEOS	·	2.7 km	MPC · JPL
17216 Scottstuart	2000 AK_{243}	Scottstuart	January 7, 2000	Anderson Mesa	LONEOS	·	14 km	MPC · JPL
17217 Pollner	2000 AR_{243}	Pollner	January 7, 2000	Socorro	LINEAR	·	3.7 km	MPC · JPL
17218 Stgeorge	2000 BV_{16}	Stgeorge	January 30, 2000	Socorro	LINEAR	·	8.6 km	MPC · JPL
17219 Gianninoto	2000 CV	Gianninoto	February 1, 2000	Catalina	CSS	EUN	6.1 km	MPC · JPL
17220 Johnpenna	2000 CX_{26}	Johnpenna	February 2, 2000	Socorro	LINEAR	·	5.7 km	MPC · JPL
17221	2000 CZ_{28}	—	February 2, 2000	Socorro	LINEAR	·	7.7 km	MPC · JPL
17222 Perlmutter	2000 CU_{44}	Perlmutter	February 2, 2000	Socorro	LINEAR	·	3.2 km	MPC · JPL
17223	2000 CX_{56}	—	February 5, 2000	Socorro	LINEAR	MAR	5.9 km	MPC · JPL
17224 Randoross	2000 CP_{58}	Randoross	February 5, 2000	Socorro	LINEAR	·	4.5 km	MPC · JPL
17225 Alanschorn	2000 CS_{60}	Alanschorn	February 2, 2000	Socorro	LINEAR	V	4.2 km	MPC · JPL
17226 Anaiahbre	2000 CC_{76}	Anaiahbre	February 8, 2000	Socorro	LINEAR	·	7.6 km	MPC · JPL
17227	2000 CW_{80}	—	February 11, 2000	Tebbutt	F. B. Zoltowski	HOF	7.4 km	MPC · JPL
17228 Adrianeliz	2000 CJ_{94}	Adrianeliz	February 8, 2000	Socorro	LINEAR	THM	8.9 km	MPC · JPL
17229	2000 CR_{97}	—	February 13, 2000	Višnjan Observatory	K. Korlević	fast	2.9 km	MPC · JPL
17230	2000 CX_{116}	—	February 3, 2000	Socorro	LINEAR	LIX	17 km	MPC · JPL
17231 Rohanwagh	2000 CB_{122}	Rohanwagh	February 3, 2000	Socorro	LINEAR	THM	9.8 km	MPC · JPL
17232	2000 DE_{3}	—	February 27, 2000	Oizumi	T. Kobayashi	·	5.2 km	MPC · JPL
17233 Stanshapiro	2000 DU_{58}	Stanshapiro	February 29, 2000	Socorro	LINEAR	·	7.0 km	MPC · JPL
17234	2000 EL_{11}	—	March 4, 2000	Socorro	LINEAR	(5)	6.8 km	MPC · JPL
17235 Ellawesson	2000 EC_{29}	Ellawesson	March 4, 2000	Socorro	LINEAR	·	9.2 km	MPC · JPL
17236 Westover	2000 EK_{45}	Westover	March 9, 2000	Socorro	LINEAR	·	4.0 km	MPC · JPL
17237	2000 EC_{50}	—	March 7, 2000	Višnjan Observatory	K. Korlević	·	3.1 km	MPC · JPL
17238 Brianwu	2000 EP_{56}	Brianwu	March 8, 2000	Socorro	LINEAR	THM	8.2 km	MPC · JPL
17239	2000 EH_{95}	—	March 9, 2000	Socorro	LINEAR	EOS	10 km	MPC · JPL
17240 Gletorrence	2000 EK_{95}	Gletorrence	March 9, 2000	Socorro	LINEAR	·	3.9 km	MPC · JPL
17241 Wooden	2000 EM_{126}	Wooden	March 11, 2000	Anderson Mesa	LONEOS	EUN ·	5.6 km	MPC · JPL
17242 Leslieyoung	2000 EX_{130}	Leslieyoung	March 11, 2000	Anderson Mesa	LONEOS	·	3.0 km	MPC · JPL
17243	2000 FX_{35}	—	March 29, 2000	Socorro	LINEAR	·	9.4 km	MPC · JPL
17244	2000 FF_{50}	—	March 28, 2000	Kvistaberg	Uppsala-DLR Asteroid Survey	EOS	7.4 km	MPC · JPL
17245 Yixie	2000 GS_{42}	Yixie	April 5, 2000	Socorro	LINEAR	·	8.5 km	MPC · JPL
17246 Christophedumas	2000 GL_{74}	Christophedumas	April 5, 2000	Socorro	LINEAR	KOR · moon	5.4 km	MPC · JPL
17247 Vanverst	2000 GG_{105}	Vanverst	April 7, 2000	Socorro	LINEAR	·	2.7 km	MPC · JPL
17248 Ellieyang	2000 GC_{107}	Ellieyang	April 7, 2000	Socorro	LINEAR	·	2.6 km	MPC · JPL
17249 Eliotyoung	2000 GM_{110}	Eliotyoung	April 2, 2000	Anderson Mesa	LONEOS	·	8.6 km	MPC · JPL
17250 Genelucas	2000 GW_{122}	Genelucas	April 11, 2000	Fountain Hills	C. W. Juels	·	10 km	MPC · JPL
17251 Vondracek	2000 GA_{127}	Vondracek	April 7, 2000	Socorro	LINEAR	moon	5.2 km	MPC · JPL
17252	2000 GJ_{127}	—	April 7, 2000	Socorro	LINEAR	·	25 km	MPC · JPL
17253 VonSecker	2000 GW_{136}	VonSecker	April 12, 2000	Socorro	LINEAR	·	5.9 km	MPC · JPL
17254	2000 GG_{137}	—	April 12, 2000	Socorro	LINEAR	·	16 km	MPC · JPL
17255	2000 GS_{163}	—	April 11, 2000	Kitt Peak	Spacewatch	·	5.7 km	MPC · JPL
17256	2000 HZ_{22}	—	April 30, 2000	Socorro	LINEAR	·	9.6 km	MPC · JPL
17257 Strazzulla	2000 HM_{25}	Strazzulla	April 26, 2000	Anderson Mesa	LONEOS	EUN	5.1 km	MPC · JPL
17258 Whalen	2000 HK_{90}	Whalen	April 29, 2000	Socorro	LINEAR	·	2.1 km	MPC · JPL
17259	2000 JE_{1}	—	May 2, 2000	Socorro	LINEAR	H	2.0 km	MPC · JPL
17260 Kušnirák	2000 JQ_{58}	Kušnirák	May 6, 2000	Socorro	LINEAR	moon	3.6 km	MPC · JPL
17261	2000 JB_{62}	—	May 7, 2000	Socorro	LINEAR	·	8.3 km	MPC · JPL
17262 Winokur	2000 JS_{62}	Winokur	May 9, 2000	Socorro	LINEAR	·	2.7 km	MPC · JPL
17263	2000 JL_{65}	—	May 5, 2000	Socorro	LINEAR	HNS	4.2 km	MPC · JPL
17264	2000 JM_{66}	—	May 6, 2000	Socorro	LINEAR	·	16 km	MPC · JPL
17265 Debennett	2000 JP_{83}	Debennett	May 6, 2000	Socorro	LINEAR	·	2.8 km	MPC · JPL
17266	2000 KT_{6}	—	May 27, 2000	Socorro	LINEAR	DOR	12 km	MPC · JPL
17267	2000 KY_{48}	—	May 28, 2000	Kitt Peak	Spacewatch	·	8.6 km	MPC · JPL
17268 Yasonik	2000 KZ_{50}	Yasonik	May 29, 2000	Socorro	LINEAR	AGN	4.7 km	MPC · JPL
17269 Dicksmith	2000 LN_{1}	Dicksmith	June 3, 2000	Reedy Creek	J. Broughton	NEM	7.5 km	MPC · JPL
17270 Nolthenius	2000 LB_{2}	Nolthenius	June 4, 2000	Reedy Creek	J. Broughton	·	13 km	MPC · JPL
17271	2000 LL_{2}	—	June 4, 2000	Socorro	LINEAR	HNS	7.3 km	MPC · JPL
17272	2000 LU_{4}	—	June 5, 2000	Socorro	LINEAR	·	5.3 km	MPC · JPL
17273 Karnik	2000 LD_{13}	Karnik	June 5, 2000	Socorro	LINEAR	·	4.3 km	MPC · JPL
17274	2000 LC_{16}	—	June 7, 2000	Socorro	LINEAR	AMO +1km	3.2 km	MPC · JPL
17275	2000 LX_{19}	—	June 8, 2000	Socorro	LINEAR	EUN	5.6 km	MPC · JPL
17276	2000 LU_{22}	—	June 4, 2000	Haleakala	NEAT	·	18 km	MPC · JPL
17277 Jarrydlevine	2000 LP_{25}	Jarrydlevine	June 7, 2000	Socorro	LINEAR	·	3.2 km	MPC · JPL
17278 Viggh	2000 LK_{27}	Viggh	June 6, 2000	Anderson Mesa	LONEOS	V	3.1 km	MPC · JPL
17279 Jeniferevans	2000 LX_{27}	Jeniferevans	June 6, 2000	Anderson Mesa	LONEOS	EUN	7.2 km	MPC · JPL
17280 Shelly	2000 LK_{28}	Shelly	June 6, 2000	Anderson Mesa	LONEOS	·	2.8 km	MPC · JPL
17281 Mattblythe	2000 LV_{28}	Mattblythe	June 6, 2000	Anderson Mesa	LONEOS	MRX	4.1 km	MPC · JPL
17282	2000 LS_{34}	—	June 3, 2000	Kitt Peak	Spacewatch	·	7.4 km	MPC · JPL
17283 Ustinov	2000 MB_{1}	Ustinov	June 24, 2000	Reedy Creek	J. Broughton	·	18 km	MPC · JPL
17284	2000 MJ_{5}	—	June 26, 2000	Socorro	LINEAR	ADE	6.2 km	MPC · JPL
17285 Bezout	2000 NU	Bezout	July 3, 2000	Prescott	P. G. Comba	·	7.5 km	MPC · JPL
17286 Bisei	2000 NB_{6}	Bisei	July 8, 2000	Bisei SG Center	BATTeRS	V	4.1 km	MPC · JPL
17287	2000 NP_{10}	—	July 7, 2000	Socorro	LINEAR	·	7.2 km	MPC · JPL
17288	2000 NZ_{10}	—	July 10, 2000	Valinhos	P. R. Holvorcem	·	3.6 km	MPC · JPL
17289	2037 P-L	—	September 24, 1960	Palomar	C. J. van Houten, I. van Houten-Groeneveld, T. Gehrels	·	15 km	MPC · JPL
17290	2060 P-L	—	September 24, 1960	Palomar	C. J. van Houten, I. van Houten-Groeneveld, T. Gehrels	·	2.5 km	MPC · JPL
17291	2547 P-L	—	September 24, 1960	Palomar	C. J. van Houten, I. van Houten-Groeneveld, T. Gehrels	THM	7.9 km	MPC · JPL
17292	2656 P-L	—	September 24, 1960	Palomar	C. J. van Houten, I. van Houten-Groeneveld, T. Gehrels	AGN	3.5 km	MPC · JPL
17293	2743 P-L	—	September 24, 1960	Palomar	C. J. van Houten, I. van Houten-Groeneveld, T. Gehrels	·	2.8 km	MPC · JPL
17294	2787 P-L	—	September 26, 1960	Palomar	C. J. van Houten, I. van Houten-Groeneveld, T. Gehrels	·	4.7 km	MPC · JPL
17295	2827 P-L	—	September 24, 1960	Palomar	C. J. van Houten, I. van Houten-Groeneveld, T. Gehrels	·	2.2 km	MPC · JPL
17296	3541 P-L	—	October 17, 1960	Palomar	C. J. van Houten, I. van Houten-Groeneveld, T. Gehrels	·	7.5 km	MPC · JPL
17297	3560 P-L	—	October 22, 1960	Palomar	C. J. van Houten, I. van Houten-Groeneveld, T. Gehrels	slow	30 km	MPC · JPL
17298	4031 P-L	—	September 24, 1960	Palomar	C. J. van Houten, I. van Houten-Groeneveld, T. Gehrels	·	6.4 km	MPC · JPL
17299	4168 P-L	—	September 24, 1960	Palomar	C. J. van Houten, I. van Houten-Groeneveld, T. Gehrels	·	5.3 km	MPC · JPL
17300	4321 P-L	—	September 24, 1960	Palomar	C. J. van Houten, I. van Houten-Groeneveld, T. Gehrels	·	2.1 km	MPC · JPL

== 17301–17400 ==
back to top

Designation			Discovery			Properties		Ref
Permanent	Provisional	Named after	Date	Site	Discoverer(s)	Category	Diam.	Ref
17301	4609 P-L	—	September 24, 1960	Palomar	C. J. van Houten, I. van Houten-Groeneveld, T. Gehrels	·	5.7 km	MPC · JPL
17302	4610 P-L	—	September 24, 1960	Palomar	C. J. van Houten, I. van Houten-Groeneveld, T. Gehrels	·	4.6 km	MPC · JPL
17303	4629 P-L	—	September 24, 1960	Palomar	C. J. van Houten, I. van Houten-Groeneveld, T. Gehrels	·	1.8 km	MPC · JPL
17304	4637 P-L	—	September 24, 1960	Palomar	C. J. van Houten, I. van Houten-Groeneveld, T. Gehrels	·	2.2 km	MPC · JPL
17305 Caniff	4652 P-L	Caniff	September 24, 1960	Palomar	C. J. van Houten, I. van Houten-Groeneveld, T. Gehrels	3:2	25 km	MPC · JPL
17306	4865 P-L	—	September 24, 1960	Palomar	C. J. van Houten, I. van Houten-Groeneveld, T. Gehrels	·	3.0 km	MPC · JPL
17307	4895 P-L	—	September 24, 1960	Palomar	C. J. van Houten, I. van Houten-Groeneveld, T. Gehrels	·	7.9 km	MPC · JPL
17308	6079 P-L	—	September 24, 1960	Palomar	C. J. van Houten, I. van Houten-Groeneveld, T. Gehrels	·	12 km	MPC · JPL
17309	6528 P-L	—	September 24, 1960	Palomar	C. J. van Houten, I. van Houten-Groeneveld, T. Gehrels	KOR	5.3 km	MPC · JPL
17310	6574 P-L	—	September 24, 1960	Palomar	C. J. van Houten, I. van Houten-Groeneveld, T. Gehrels	·	4.2 km	MPC · JPL
17311	6584 P-L	—	September 24, 1960	Palomar	C. J. van Houten, I. van Houten-Groeneveld, T. Gehrels	·	7.0 km	MPC · JPL
17312	7622 P-L	—	October 22, 1960	Palomar	C. J. van Houten, I. van Houten-Groeneveld, T. Gehrels	·	3.8 km	MPC · JPL
17313	9542 P-L	—	October 17, 1960	Palomar	C. J. van Houten, I. van Houten-Groeneveld, T. Gehrels	·	5.0 km	MPC · JPL
17314 Aisakos	1024 T-1	Aisakos	March 25, 1971	Palomar	C. J. van Houten, I. van Houten-Groeneveld, T. Gehrels	L5	36 km	MPC · JPL
17315	1089 T-1	—	March 25, 1971	Palomar	C. J. van Houten, I. van Houten-Groeneveld, T. Gehrels	EOS	8.0 km	MPC · JPL
17316	1198 T-1	—	March 25, 1971	Palomar	C. J. van Houten, I. van Houten-Groeneveld, T. Gehrels	HYG	8.6 km	MPC · JPL
17317	1208 T-1	—	March 25, 1971	Palomar	C. J. van Houten, I. van Houten-Groeneveld, T. Gehrels	·	3.7 km	MPC · JPL
17318	2091 T-1	—	March 25, 1971	Palomar	C. J. van Houten, I. van Houten-Groeneveld, T. Gehrels	·	7.9 km	MPC · JPL
17319	3078 T-1	—	March 26, 1971	Palomar	C. J. van Houten, I. van Houten-Groeneveld, T. Gehrels	·	2.6 km	MPC · JPL
17320	3182 T-1	—	March 26, 1971	Palomar	C. J. van Houten, I. van Houten-Groeneveld, T. Gehrels	·	9.8 km	MPC · JPL
17321	3188 T-1	—	March 26, 1971	Palomar	C. J. van Houten, I. van Houten-Groeneveld, T. Gehrels	·	8.0 km	MPC · JPL
17322	3274 T-1	—	March 26, 1971	Palomar	C. J. van Houten, I. van Houten-Groeneveld, T. Gehrels	EUN	5.7 km	MPC · JPL
17323	3284 T-1	—	March 26, 1971	Palomar	C. J. van Houten, I. van Houten-Groeneveld, T. Gehrels	EOS	6.3 km	MPC · JPL
17324	3292 T-1	—	March 26, 1971	Palomar	C. J. van Houten, I. van Houten-Groeneveld, T. Gehrels	·	3.1 km	MPC · JPL
17325	3300 T-1	—	March 26, 1971	Palomar	C. J. van Houten, I. van Houten-Groeneveld, T. Gehrels	·	3.2 km	MPC · JPL
17326	4023 T-1	—	March 26, 1971	Palomar	C. J. van Houten, I. van Houten-Groeneveld, T. Gehrels	·	2.6 km	MPC · JPL
17327	4155 T-1	—	March 26, 1971	Palomar	C. J. van Houten, I. van Houten-Groeneveld, T. Gehrels	(12739)	5.2 km	MPC · JPL
17328	1176 T-2	—	September 29, 1973	Palomar	C. J. van Houten, I. van Houten-Groeneveld, T. Gehrels	·	2.8 km	MPC · JPL
17329	1277 T-2	—	September 29, 1973	Palomar	C. J. van Houten, I. van Houten-Groeneveld, T. Gehrels	THM	8.7 km	MPC · JPL
17330	1358 T-2	—	September 29, 1973	Palomar	C. J. van Houten, I. van Houten-Groeneveld, T. Gehrels	·	2.5 km	MPC · JPL
17331	2056 T-2	—	September 29, 1973	Palomar	C. J. van Houten, I. van Houten-Groeneveld, T. Gehrels	·	2.3 km	MPC · JPL
17332	2120 T-2	—	September 29, 1973	Palomar	C. J. van Houten, I. van Houten-Groeneveld, T. Gehrels	·	1.9 km	MPC · JPL
17333	2174 T-2	—	September 29, 1973	Palomar	C. J. van Houten, I. van Houten-Groeneveld, T. Gehrels	PAD	7.3 km	MPC · JPL
17334	2275 T-2	—	September 29, 1973	Palomar	C. J. van Houten, I. van Houten-Groeneveld, T. Gehrels	·	9.9 km	MPC · JPL
17335	2281 T-2	—	September 29, 1973	Palomar	C. J. van Houten, I. van Houten-Groeneveld, T. Gehrels	·	5.9 km	MPC · JPL
17336	3193 T-2	—	September 30, 1973	Palomar	C. J. van Houten, I. van Houten-Groeneveld, T. Gehrels	·	9.2 km	MPC · JPL
17337	3198 T-2	—	September 30, 1973	Palomar	C. J. van Houten, I. van Houten-Groeneveld, T. Gehrels	HYG	8.8 km	MPC · JPL
17338	3212 T-2	—	September 30, 1973	Palomar	C. J. van Houten, I. van Houten-Groeneveld, T. Gehrels	·	3.2 km	MPC · JPL
17339	4060 T-2	—	September 29, 1973	Palomar	C. J. van Houten, I. van Houten-Groeneveld, T. Gehrels	·	3.8 km	MPC · JPL
17340	4096 T-2	—	September 29, 1973	Palomar	C. J. van Houten, I. van Houten-Groeneveld, T. Gehrels	EOS	5.0 km	MPC · JPL
17341	4120 T-2	—	September 29, 1973	Palomar	C. J. van Houten, I. van Houten-Groeneveld, T. Gehrels	·	1.5 km	MPC · JPL
17342	5185 T-2	—	September 25, 1973	Palomar	C. J. van Houten, I. van Houten-Groeneveld, T. Gehrels	·	7.4 km	MPC · JPL
17343	1111 T-3	—	October 17, 1977	Palomar	C. J. van Houten, I. van Houten-Groeneveld, T. Gehrels	·	5.3 km	MPC · JPL
17344	1120 T-3	—	October 17, 1977	Palomar	C. J. van Houten, I. van Houten-Groeneveld, T. Gehrels	GEF	4.2 km	MPC · JPL
17345	2216 T-3	—	October 16, 1977	Palomar	C. J. van Houten, I. van Houten-Groeneveld, T. Gehrels	·	3.1 km	MPC · JPL
17346	2395 T-3	—	October 16, 1977	Palomar	C. J. van Houten, I. van Houten-Groeneveld, T. Gehrels	·	10 km	MPC · JPL
17347	3449 T-3	—	October 16, 1977	Palomar	C. J. van Houten, I. van Houten-Groeneveld, T. Gehrels	·	10 km	MPC · JPL
17348	4166 T-3	—	October 16, 1977	Palomar	C. J. van Houten, I. van Houten-Groeneveld, T. Gehrels	·	4.0 km	MPC · JPL
17349	4353 T-3	—	October 16, 1977	Palomar	C. J. van Houten, I. van Houten-Groeneveld, T. Gehrels	HYG	14 km	MPC · JPL
17350	1968 OJ	—	July 18, 1968	Cerro El Roble	C. Torres, Cofre, S.	·	6.3 km	MPC · JPL
17351 Pheidippos	1973 SV	Pheidippos	September 19, 1973	Palomar	C. J. van Houten, I. van Houten-Groeneveld, T. Gehrels	L4	29 km	MPC · JPL
17352	1975 SG_{1}	—	September 30, 1975	Palomar	S. J. Bus	·	7.5 km	MPC · JPL
17353	1975 TE	—	October 10, 1975	Anderson Mesa	H. L. Giclas	·	3.7 km	MPC · JPL
17354 Matrosov	1977 EU_{1}	Matrosov	March 13, 1977	Nauchnij	N. S. Chernykh	·	7.1 km	MPC · JPL
17355	1978 NK	—	July 10, 1978	Palomar	E. F. Helin, E. M. Shoemaker	·	5.5 km	MPC · JPL
17356 Vityazev	1978 PG_{4}	Vityazev	August 9, 1978	Nauchnij	N. S. Chernykh	·	3.3 km	MPC · JPL
17357 Lucataliano	1978 QH_{3}	Lucataliano	August 23, 1978	Mount Stromlo	G. de Sanctis, V. Zappalà	·	10 km	MPC · JPL
17358 Lozino-Lozinskij	1978 SU_{4}	Lozino-Lozinskij	September 27, 1978	Nauchnij	L. I. Chernykh	V	3.9 km	MPC · JPL
17359	1978 UP_{4}	—	October 27, 1978	Palomar	C. M. Olmstead	·	8.2 km	MPC · JPL
17360	1978 UX_{5}	—	October 27, 1978	Palomar	C. M. Olmstead	·	1.9 km	MPC · JPL
17361	1978 UF_{7}	—	October 27, 1978	Palomar	C. M. Olmstead	·	8.4 km	MPC · JPL
17362	1978 UT_{7}	—	October 27, 1978	Palomar	C. M. Olmstead	·	7.8 km	MPC · JPL
17363	1978 VF_{3}	—	November 7, 1978	Palomar	E. F. Helin, S. J. Bus	·	4.4 km	MPC · JPL
17364	1978 VR_{10}	—	November 7, 1978	Palomar	E. F. Helin, S. J. Bus	·	9.7 km	MPC · JPL
17365 Thymbraeus	1978 VF_{11}	Thymbraeus	November 7, 1978	Palomar	E. F. Helin, S. J. Bus	L5	45 km	MPC · JPL
17366	1979 OV_{4}	—	July 24, 1979	Palomar	S. J. Bus	KOR	6.3 km	MPC · JPL
17367	1979 OU_{11}	—	July 26, 1979	Palomar	S. J. Bus	EUN · slow	4.2 km	MPC · JPL
17368 Korn	1979 QV_{1}	Korn	August 22, 1979	La Silla	C.-I. Lagerkvist	·	2.8 km	MPC · JPL
17369 Eremeeva	1979 QR_{2}	Eremeeva	August 22, 1979	La Silla	C.-I. Lagerkvist	KOR	5.2 km	MPC · JPL
17370	1980 CJ	—	February 13, 1980	Harvard Observatory	Harvard Observatory	·	15 km	MPC · JPL
17371	1981 DT	—	February 28, 1981	Siding Spring	S. J. Bus	·	10 km	MPC · JPL
17372	1981 DV	—	February 28, 1981	Siding Spring	S. J. Bus	MAR	3.6 km	MPC · JPL
17373	1981 EQ_{3}	—	March 2, 1981	Siding Spring	S. J. Bus	·	9.7 km	MPC · JPL
17374	1981 EF_{4}	—	March 2, 1981	Siding Spring	S. J. Bus	·	3.2 km	MPC · JPL
17375	1981 EJ_{4}	—	March 2, 1981	Siding Spring	S. J. Bus	·	4.3 km	MPC · JPL
17376	1981 EQ_{4}	—	March 2, 1981	Siding Spring	S. J. Bus	slow	9.0 km	MPC · JPL
17377	1981 EF_{5}	—	March 2, 1981	Siding Spring	S. J. Bus	·	6.4 km	MPC · JPL
17378	1981 EM_{5}	—	March 2, 1981	Siding Spring	S. J. Bus	EOS	6.9 km	MPC · JPL
17379	1981 ED_{8}	—	March 1, 1981	Siding Spring	S. J. Bus	·	2.8 km	MPC · JPL
17380	1981 EB_{10}	—	March 1, 1981	Siding Spring	S. J. Bus	·	2.4 km	MPC · JPL
17381	1981 EC_{11}	—	March 1, 1981	Siding Spring	S. J. Bus	·	4.7 km	MPC · JPL
17382	1981 EH_{11}	—	March 1, 1981	Siding Spring	S. J. Bus	EUN	5.1 km	MPC · JPL
17383	1981 EE_{12}	—	March 1, 1981	Siding Spring	S. J. Bus	·	2.4 km	MPC · JPL
17384	1981 EM_{12}	—	March 1, 1981	Siding Spring	S. J. Bus	·	6.4 km	MPC · JPL
17385	1981 EU_{13}	—	March 1, 1981	Siding Spring	S. J. Bus	·	4.0 km	MPC · JPL
17386	1981 EA_{23}	—	March 2, 1981	Siding Spring	S. J. Bus	·	3.2 km	MPC · JPL
17387	1981 EV_{23}	—	March 3, 1981	Siding Spring	S. J. Bus	RAF	3.0 km	MPC · JPL
17388	1981 EZ_{24}	—	March 2, 1981	Siding Spring	S. J. Bus	EUN	3.7 km	MPC · JPL
17389	1981 EN_{30}	—	March 2, 1981	Siding Spring	S. J. Bus	THM	11 km	MPC · JPL
17390	1981 EZ_{37}	—	March 1, 1981	Siding Spring	S. J. Bus	·	7.9 km	MPC · JPL
17391	1981 EK_{39}	—	March 2, 1981	Siding Spring	S. J. Bus	·	2.9 km	MPC · JPL
17392	1981 EY_{40}	—	March 2, 1981	Siding Spring	S. J. Bus	(17392)	4.0 km	MPC · JPL
17393	1981 EA_{41}	—	March 2, 1981	Siding Spring	S. J. Bus	·	7.4 km	MPC · JPL
17394	1981 ER_{42}	—	March 2, 1981	Siding Spring	S. J. Bus	·	7.7 km	MPC · JPL
17395	1981 EA_{44}	—	March 6, 1981	Siding Spring	S. J. Bus	EUN	4.5 km	MPC · JPL
17396	1981 EK_{45}	—	March 1, 1981	Siding Spring	S. J. Bus	·	2.4 km	MPC · JPL
17397	1981 EF_{48}	—	March 6, 1981	Siding Spring	S. J. Bus	3:2	13 km	MPC · JPL
17398	1982 UR_{2}	—	October 20, 1982	Kitt Peak	G. Aldering	·	9.6 km	MPC · JPL
17399 Andysanto	1983 RL	Andysanto	September 6, 1983	Palomar	C. S. Shoemaker, E. M. Shoemaker	H	2.4 km	MPC · JPL
17400	1985 PL_{1}	—	August 13, 1985	Harvard Observatory	Oak Ridge Observatory	·	7.7 km	MPC · JPL

== 17401–17500 ==
back to top

Designation			Discovery			Properties		Ref
Permanent	Provisional	Named after	Date	Site	Discoverer(s)	Category	Diam.	Ref
17401	1985 RP_{3}	—	September 7, 1985	La Silla	H. Debehogne	NYS	3.2 km	MPC · JPL
17402 Valeryshuvalov	1985 UF	Valeryshuvalov	October 20, 1985	Anderson Mesa	E. Bowell	·	3.6 km	MPC · JPL
17403 Masciarelli	1986 EL_{5}	Masciarelli	March 6, 1986	La Silla	G. de Sanctis	(5)	6.8 km	MPC · JPL
17404	1986 TZ_{3}	—	October 4, 1986	Kleť	A. Mrkos	·	3.3 km	MPC · JPL
17405	1986 VQ_{2}	—	November 4, 1986	Caussols	CERGA	·	3.3 km	MPC · JPL
17406	1987 DO	—	February 25, 1987	Ojima	T. Niijima, T. Urata	·	4.2 km	MPC · JPL
17407 Teige	1987 TG	Teige	October 14, 1987	Kleť	A. Mrkos	·	9.0 km	MPC · JPL
17408 McAdams	1987 UZ_{1}	McAdams	October 19, 1987	Palomar	C. S. Shoemaker, E. M. Shoemaker	H	3.3 km	MPC · JPL
17409	1988 BA_{4}	—	January 19, 1988	La Silla	H. Debehogne	V	2.5 km	MPC · JPL
17410 Zitarrosa	1988 CQ_{4}	Zitarrosa	February 13, 1988	La Silla	E. W. Elst	V	3.4 km	MPC · JPL
17411	1988 DF_{3}	—	February 22, 1988	Siding Spring	R. H. McNaught	·	3.6 km	MPC · JPL
17412 Kroll	1988 KV	Kroll	May 24, 1988	La Silla	W. Landgraf	·	2.8 km	MPC · JPL
17413	1988 RT_{4}	—	September 1, 1988	La Silla	H. Debehogne	(3460)	10 km	MPC · JPL
17414	1988 RN_{10}	—	September 14, 1988	Cerro Tololo	S. J. Bus	L5	22 km	MPC · JPL
17415 Czesławlang	1988 RO_{10}	Czesławlang	September 14, 1988	Cerro Tololo	S. J. Bus	L5	18 km	MPC · JPL
17416	1988 RR_{10}	—	September 14, 1988	Cerro Tololo	S. J. Bus	L5	18 km	MPC · JPL
17417	1988 RY_{10}	—	September 14, 1988	Cerro Tololo	S. J. Bus	L5	28 km	MPC · JPL
17418	1988 RT_{12}	—	September 14, 1988	Cerro Tololo	S. J. Bus	L5	16 km	MPC · JPL
17419	1988 RH_{13}	—	September 14, 1988	Cerro Tololo	S. J. Bus	L5	33 km	MPC · JPL
17420	1988 RL_{13}	—	September 14, 1988	Cerro Tololo	S. J. Bus	L5	18 km	MPC · JPL
17421	1988 SW_{1}	—	September 16, 1988	Cerro Tololo	S. J. Bus	L5	24 km	MPC · JPL
17422	1988 SE_{2}	—	September 16, 1988	Cerro Tololo	S. J. Bus	·	4.0 km	MPC · JPL
17423	1988 SK_{2}	—	September 16, 1988	Cerro Tololo	S. J. Bus	L5	15 km	MPC · JPL
17424	1988 SP_{2}	—	September 16, 1988	Cerro Tololo	S. J. Bus	L5	18 km	MPC · JPL
17425	1989 AM_{3}	—	January 4, 1989	Siding Spring	R. H. McNaught	ADE	9.5 km	MPC · JPL
17426	1989 CS_{1}	—	February 5, 1989	Gekko	Y. Oshima	EUN	5.5 km	MPC · JPL
17427 Poe	1989 CQ_{2}	Poe	February 4, 1989	La Silla	E. W. Elst	CYB	14 km	MPC · JPL
17428 Charleroi	1989 DL	Charleroi	February 28, 1989	La Silla	H. Debehogne	HIL · 3:2	30 km	MPC · JPL
17429 Ianhowarth	1989 GD_{1}	Ianhowarth	April 3, 1989	La Silla	E. W. Elst	·	1.9 km	MPC · JPL
17430	1989 KF	—	May 31, 1989	Palomar	H. E. Holt	BRA	11 km	MPC · JPL
17431 Sainte-Colombe	1989 RT	Sainte-Colombe	September 3, 1989	Haute Provence	E. W. Elst	V	4.4 km	MPC · JPL
17432	1989 SR	—	September 29, 1989	Kushiro	S. Ueda, H. Kaneda	EOS	8.3 km	MPC · JPL
17433	1989 SV_{2}	—	September 26, 1989	La Silla	E. W. Elst	EOS	8.2 km	MPC · JPL
17434	1989 SN_{3}	—	September 26, 1989	La Silla	E. W. Elst	HYG	7.2 km	MPC · JPL
17435 di Giovanni	1989 SP_{3}	di Giovanni	September 26, 1989	La Silla	E. W. Elst	·	3.1 km	MPC · JPL
17436	1989 SV_{3}	—	September 26, 1989	La Silla	E. W. Elst	·	3.1 km	MPC · JPL
17437 Stekene	1989 SC_{4}	Stekene	September 26, 1989	La Silla	E. W. Elst	·	14 km	MPC · JPL
17438 Quasimodo	1989 SQ_{4}	Quasimodo	September 26, 1989	La Silla	E. W. Elst	·	5.5 km	MPC · JPL
17439 Juliesan	1989 TR_{3}	Juliesan	October 7, 1989	La Silla	E. W. Elst	VER	8.6 km	MPC · JPL
17440	1989 TP_{14}	—	October 2, 1989	La Silla	H. Debehogne	·	13 km	MPC · JPL
17441	1989 UE	—	October 20, 1989	Kani	Y. Mizuno, T. Furuta	NYS	4.7 km	MPC · JPL
17442	1989 UO_{5}	—	October 30, 1989	Cerro Tololo	S. J. Bus	L5	23 km	MPC · JPL
17443	1989 UU_{5}	—	October 30, 1989	Cerro Tololo	S. J. Bus	(1118)	12 km	MPC · JPL
17444	1989 VQ_{1}	—	November 3, 1989	La Silla	E. W. Elst	·	3.0 km	MPC · JPL
17445 Avatcha	1989 YC_{5}	Avatcha	December 28, 1989	Haute Provence	E. W. Elst	·	20 km	MPC · JPL
17446 Mopaku	1990 BC_{2}	Mopaku	January 23, 1990	Kavalur	Rajamohan, R.	V	4.8 km	MPC · JPL
17447 Heindl	1990 HE	Heindl	April 25, 1990	Palomar	E. F. Helin	H	2.6 km	MPC · JPL
17448	1990 HU_{1}	—	April 27, 1990	Siding Spring	R. H. McNaught	·	4.2 km	MPC · JPL
17449	1990 OD_{5}	—	July 27, 1990	Palomar	H. E. Holt	DOR	10 km	MPC · JPL
17450	1990 QO_{4}	—	August 23, 1990	Palomar	H. E. Holt	EOS	7.4 km	MPC · JPL
17451	1990 QF_{8}	—	August 16, 1990	La Silla	E. W. Elst	·	2.3 km	MPC · JPL
17452 Amurreka	1990 QE_{10}	Amurreka	August 16, 1990	La Silla	E. W. Elst	·	5.5 km	MPC · JPL
17453	1990 RQ_{9}	—	September 14, 1990	Palomar	H. E. Holt	·	3.6 km	MPC · JPL
17454	1990 SA_{7}	—	September 22, 1990	La Silla	E. W. Elst	·	2.1 km	MPC · JPL
17455	1990 SH_{7}	—	September 22, 1990	La Silla	E. W. Elst	KOR	4.6 km	MPC · JPL
17456	1990 SS_{7}	—	September 22, 1990	La Silla	E. W. Elst	KOR	5.6 km	MPC · JPL
17457	1990 SC_{11}	—	September 16, 1990	Palomar	H. E. Holt	·	2.3 km	MPC · JPL
17458 Dick	1990 TP_{7}	Dick	October 13, 1990	Tautenburg Observatory	L. D. Schmadel, F. Börngen	·	4.5 km	MPC · JPL
17459 Andreashofer	1990 TJ_{8}	Andreashofer	October 13, 1990	Tautenburg Observatory	F. Börngen, L. D. Schmadel	·	4.0 km	MPC · JPL
17460 Mang	1990 TC_{11}	Mang	October 10, 1990	Tautenburg Observatory	L. D. Schmadel, F. Börngen	·	2.0 km	MPC · JPL
17461 Shigosenger	1990 UD_{1}	Shigosenger	October 20, 1990	Geisei	T. Seki	·	6.9 km	MPC · JPL
17462 Takahisa	1990 UP_{1}	Takahisa	October 22, 1990	Kitami	K. Endate, K. Watanabe	·	2.8 km	MPC · JPL
17463	1990 UO_{5}	—	October 16, 1990	La Silla	E. W. Elst	·	10 km	MPC · JPL
17464	1990 VX_{1}	—	November 11, 1990	Fujieda	Shiozawa, H., M. Kizawa	·	3.2 km	MPC · JPL
17465 Inawashiroko	1990 VU_{3}	Inawashiroko	November 11, 1990	Geisei	T. Seki	·	7.0 km	MPC · JPL
17466 Vargasllosa	1990 VL_{4}	Vargasllosa	November 15, 1990	La Silla	E. W. Elst	·	2.6 km	MPC · JPL
17467	1990 VE_{6}	—	November 15, 1990	La Silla	E. W. Elst	EOS	7.0 km	MPC · JPL
17468	1990 WT_{6}	—	November 21, 1990	La Silla	E. W. Elst	·	2.7 km	MPC · JPL
17469	1991 BT	—	January 19, 1991	Dynic	A. Sugie	·	6.0 km	MPC · JPL
17470 Mitsuhashi	1991 BX	Mitsuhashi	January 19, 1991	Kitami	K. Endate, K. Watanabe	HYG	12 km	MPC · JPL
17471	1991 EO_{2}	—	March 11, 1991	La Silla	H. Debehogne	NYS	3.8 km	MPC · JPL
17472 Dinah	1991 FY	Dinah	March 17, 1991	Ojima	T. Niijima, T. Urata	·	4.2 km	MPC · JPL
17473 Freddiemercury	1991 FM_{3}	Freddiemercury	March 21, 1991	La Silla	H. Debehogne	MAS	3.4 km	MPC · JPL
17474	1991 GK_{5}	—	April 8, 1991	La Silla	E. W. Elst	NYS	4.7 km	MPC · JPL
17475	1991 GA_{7}	—	April 8, 1991	La Silla	E. W. Elst	·	4.7 km	MPC · JPL
17476	1991 GG_{7}	—	April 8, 1991	La Silla	E. W. Elst	·	4.7 km	MPC · JPL
17477	1991 GN_{9}	—	April 10, 1991	La Silla	E. W. Elst	·	2.8 km	MPC · JPL
17478	1991 LQ	—	June 13, 1991	Palomar	E. F. Helin	EUN	5.1 km	MPC · JPL
17479	1991 PV_{9}	—	August 13, 1991	Palomar	E. F. Helin	·	6.4 km	MPC · JPL
17480	1991 PE_{10}	—	August 7, 1991	Palomar	H. E. Holt	GEF	4.3 km	MPC · JPL
17481	1991 PE_{11}	—	August 7, 1991	Palomar	H. E. Holt	MRX	4.1 km	MPC · JPL
17482	1991 PY_{14}	—	August 6, 1991	Palomar	H. E. Holt	·	5.8 km	MPC · JPL
17483	1991 RA	—	September 2, 1991	Siding Spring	K. S. Russell	H	1.6 km	MPC · JPL
17484 Ganghofer	1991 RY_{4}	Ganghofer	September 13, 1991	Tautenburg Observatory	F. Börngen, L. D. Schmadel	·	4.7 km	MPC · JPL
17485	1991 RP_{9}	—	September 5, 1991	Siding Spring	R. H. McNaught	·	6.3 km	MPC · JPL
17486 Hodler	1991 RB_{41}	Hodler	September 10, 1991	Tautenburg Observatory	F. Börngen	·	4.9 km	MPC · JPL
17487	1991 SY	—	September 30, 1991	Siding Spring	R. H. McNaught	EUN	6.2 km	MPC · JPL
17488 Mantl	1991 TQ_{6}	Mantl	October 2, 1991	Tautenburg Observatory	L. D. Schmadel, F. Börngen	MRX	3.8 km	MPC · JPL
17489 Trenker	1991 TS_{6}	Trenker	October 2, 1991	Tautenburg Observatory	F. Börngen, L. D. Schmadel	·	3.2 km	MPC · JPL
17490	1991 UC_{3}	—	October 31, 1991	Kushiro	S. Ueda, H. Kaneda	·	6.9 km	MPC · JPL
17491	1991 UM_{3}	—	October 31, 1991	Kushiro	S. Ueda, H. Kaneda	·	10 km	MPC · JPL
17492 Hippasos	1991 XG_{1}	Hippasos	December 10, 1991	Tautenburg Observatory	F. Börngen	L5 · (17492)	54 km	MPC · JPL
17493 Wildcat	1991 YA	Wildcat	December 31, 1991	Palomar	C. S. Shoemaker, D. H. Levy	T_{j} (2.83)	5.2 km	MPC · JPL
17494 Antaviana	1992 AM_{3}	Antaviana	January 11, 1992	Mérida	Naranjo, O. A.	·	8.5 km	MPC · JPL
17495	1992 DY	—	February 27, 1992	Uenohara	N. Kawasato	·	3.7 km	MPC · JPL
17496 Augustinus	1992 DM_{2}	Augustinus	February 29, 1992	Tautenburg Observatory	F. Börngen	·	2.3 km	MPC · JPL
17497	1992 DO_{6}	—	February 29, 1992	La Silla	UESAC	·	5.8 km	MPC · JPL
17498	1992 EP_{4}	—	March 1, 1992	La Silla	UESAC	·	3.3 km	MPC · JPL
17499	1992 EJ_{5}	—	March 1, 1992	La Silla	UESAC	·	2.0 km	MPC · JPL
17500	1992 EQ_{10}	—	March 6, 1992	La Silla	UESAC	·	6.8 km	MPC · JPL

== 17501–17600 ==
back to top

Designation			Discovery			Properties		Ref
Permanent	Provisional	Named after	Date	Site	Discoverer(s)	Category	Diam.	Ref
17501 Tetsuro	1992 FG	Tetsuro	March 23, 1992	Kitami	K. Endate, K. Watanabe	BAP	5.5 km	MPC · JPL
17502 Manabeseiji	1992 FD_{1}	Manabeseiji	March 23, 1992	Kitami	K. Endate, K. Watanabe	·	3.0 km	MPC · JPL
17503 Celestechild	1992 FK_{1}	Celestechild	March 26, 1992	Siding Spring	R. H. McNaught	PHO	2.9 km	MPC · JPL
17504	1992 GB_{2}	—	April 4, 1992	La Silla	E. W. Elst	·	2.6 km	MPC · JPL
17505	1992 GO_{2}	—	April 4, 1992	La Silla	E. W. Elst	·	2.6 km	MPC · JPL
17506 Walschap	1992 GW_{4}	Walschap	April 4, 1992	La Silla	E. W. Elst	·	2.4 km	MPC · JPL
17507	1992 HH_{5}	—	April 24, 1992	La Silla	H. Debehogne	·	3.9 km	MPC · JPL
17508 Takumadan	1992 JH	Takumadan	May 3, 1992	Geisei	T. Seki	·	6.9 km	MPC · JPL
17509 Ikumadan	1992 JR	Ikumadan	May 4, 1992	Geisei	T. Seki	·	3.5 km	MPC · JPL
17510	1992 PD_{6}	—	August 1, 1992	La Silla	H. Debehogne, Á. López-G.	·	2.5 km	MPC · JPL
17511	1992 QN	—	August 29, 1992	Palomar	E. F. Helin, J. Alu	APO +1km	1.2 km	MPC · JPL
17512	1992 RN	—	September 4, 1992	Kiyosato	S. Otomo	·	7.2 km	MPC · JPL
17513	1992 UM	—	October 19, 1992	Kushiro	S. Ueda, H. Kaneda	·	4.0 km	MPC · JPL
17514	1992 UA_{1}	—	October 19, 1992	Kushiro	S. Ueda, H. Kaneda	·	7.9 km	MPC · JPL
17515	1992 UT_{1}	—	October 21, 1992	Dynic	A. Sugie	·	3.8 km	MPC · JPL
17516 Kogayukihito	1992 UZ_{6}	Kogayukihito	October 28, 1992	Kitami	M. Yanai, K. Watanabe	(5)	4.4 km	MPC · JPL
17517	1992 WZ_{3}	—	November 21, 1992	Kushiro	S. Ueda, H. Kaneda	EUN	4.1 km	MPC · JPL
17518 Redqueen	1992 YD	Redqueen	December 18, 1992	Yakiimo	Natori, A., T. Urata	·	7.0 km	MPC · JPL
17519 Pritsak	1992 YE_{2}	Pritsak	December 18, 1992	Caussols	E. W. Elst	EUN	6.5 km	MPC · JPL
17520 Hisayukiyoshio	1993 BX_{2}	Hisayukiyoshio	January 23, 1993	Kitami	K. Endate, K. Watanabe	·	12 km	MPC · JPL
17521 Kiek	1993 BR_{4}	Kiek	January 27, 1993	Caussols	E. W. Elst	·	7.3 km	MPC · JPL
17522	1993 BL_{7}	—	January 23, 1993	La Silla	E. W. Elst	AGN	5.0 km	MPC · JPL
17523	1993 FX_{2}	—	March 23, 1993	Kitt Peak	Spacewatch	KOR	4.8 km	MPC · JPL
17524	1993 FS_{4}	—	March 17, 1993	La Silla	UESAC	THM	6.9 km	MPC · JPL
17525	1993 FH_{5}	—	March 17, 1993	La Silla	UESAC	KOR	4.5 km	MPC · JPL
17526	1993 FV_{5}	—	March 17, 1993	La Silla	UESAC	THM	7.0 km	MPC · JPL
17527	1993 FC_{14}	—	March 17, 1993	La Silla	UESAC	·	4.9 km	MPC · JPL
17528	1993 FX_{14}	—	March 17, 1993	La Silla	UESAC	EOS	5.2 km	MPC · JPL
17529	1993 FJ_{23}	—	March 21, 1993	La Silla	UESAC	·	11 km	MPC · JPL
17530	1993 FZ_{23}	—	March 21, 1993	La Silla	UESAC	TIR	6.9 km	MPC · JPL
17531	1993 FU_{25}	—	March 21, 1993	La Silla	UESAC	·	7.4 km	MPC · JPL
17532	1993 FD_{34}	—	March 19, 1993	La Silla	UESAC	EOS	4.3 km	MPC · JPL
17533	1993 FR_{36}	—	March 19, 1993	La Silla	UESAC	THM	9.2 km	MPC · JPL
17534	1993 FB_{40}	—	March 19, 1993	La Silla	UESAC	·	8.9 km	MPC · JPL
17535	1993 FF_{40}	—	March 19, 1993	La Silla	UESAC	·	5.7 km	MPC · JPL
17536	1993 FM_{40}	—	March 19, 1993	La Silla	UESAC	·	6.2 km	MPC · JPL
17537	1993 FN_{40}	—	March 19, 1993	La Silla	UESAC	KOR	6.0 km	MPC · JPL
17538	1993 FZ_{44}	—	March 19, 1993	La Silla	UESAC	·	6.0 km	MPC · JPL
17539	1993 FR_{46}	—	March 19, 1993	La Silla	UESAC	·	4.5 km	MPC · JPL
17540	1993 FX_{81}	—	March 18, 1993	La Silla	UESAC	·	7.0 km	MPC · JPL
17541	1993 OL_{5}	—	July 20, 1993	La Silla	E. W. Elst	·	1.4 km	MPC · JPL
17542	1993 OW_{6}	—	July 20, 1993	La Silla	E. W. Elst	·	2.2 km	MPC · JPL
17543 Sosva	1993 PA_{3}	Sosva	August 14, 1993	Caussols	E. W. Elst	·	10 km	MPC · JPL
17544 Kojiroishikawa	1993 RF_{2}	Kojiroishikawa	September 15, 1993	Kitami	K. Endate, K. Watanabe	·	3.5 km	MPC · JPL
17545	1993 RZ_{3}	—	September 15, 1993	La Silla	E. W. Elst	·	3.0 km	MPC · JPL
17546 Osadakentaro	1993 SB_{2}	Osadakentaro	September 19, 1993	Kitami	K. Endate, K. Watanabe	·	3.7 km	MPC · JPL
17547 Nestebovelli	1993 SN_{2}	Nestebovelli	September 21, 1993	Stroncone	A. Vagnozzi	NYS	3.0 km	MPC · JPL
17548	1993 SX_{6}	—	September 17, 1993	La Silla	E. W. Elst	·	2.9 km	MPC · JPL
17549	1993 TW_{12}	—	October 13, 1993	Palomar	H. E. Holt	·	3.4 km	MPC · JPL
17550	1993 TO_{18}	—	October 9, 1993	La Silla	E. W. Elst	NYS	2.4 km	MPC · JPL
17551	1993 TZ_{31}	—	October 9, 1993	La Silla	E. W. Elst	·	2.9 km	MPC · JPL
17552	1993 TZ_{36}	—	October 9, 1993	La Silla	E. W. Elst	·	1.9 km	MPC · JPL
17553	1993 UQ_{5}	—	October 20, 1993	La Silla	E. W. Elst	·	3.0 km	MPC · JPL
17554	1993 VY	—	November 9, 1993	Palomar	E. F. Helin	PHO · slow	4.3 km	MPC · JPL
17555 Kenkennedy	1993 VC_{5}	Kenkennedy	November 4, 1993	Siding Spring	R. H. McNaught	·	2.6 km	MPC · JPL
17556 Pierofrancesca	1993 WB	Pierofrancesca	November 16, 1993	Colleverde	V. S. Casulli	·	4.0 km	MPC · JPL
17557	1994 AX	—	January 4, 1994	Oizumi	T. Kobayashi	NYS	4.0 km	MPC · JPL
17558	1994 AA_{1}	—	January 4, 1994	Yatsugatake	Y. Kushida, O. Muramatsu	·	6.2 km	MPC · JPL
17559	1994 AR_{1}	—	January 8, 1994	Dynic	A. Sugie	·	4.1 km	MPC · JPL
17560	1994 AD_{3}	—	January 14, 1994	Sormano	Gualdoni, C., A. Testa	·	2.9 km	MPC · JPL
17561	1994 AE_{11}	—	January 8, 1994	Kitt Peak	Spacewatch	·	5.8 km	MPC · JPL
17562	1994 BG_{4}	—	January 16, 1994	Caussols	E. W. Elst, C. Pollas	V	3.6 km	MPC · JPL
17563 Tsuneyoshi	1994 CC_{1}	Tsuneyoshi	February 5, 1994	Yatsugatake	Y. Kushida, O. Muramatsu	·	8.7 km	MPC · JPL
17564	1994 CQ_{1}	—	February 7, 1994	Oizumi	T. Kobayashi	·	4.8 km	MPC · JPL
17565	1994 CG_{2}	—	February 12, 1994	Oizumi	T. Kobayashi	MAR	4.4 km	MPC · JPL
17566	1994 CE_{11}	—	February 7, 1994	La Silla	E. W. Elst	(5)	7.0 km	MPC · JPL
17567 Hoshinoyakata	1994 GP	Hoshinoyakata	April 5, 1994	Kitami	K. Endate, K. Watanabe	DOR	17 km	MPC · JPL
17568	1994 GT_{8}	—	April 11, 1994	Palomar	E. F. Helin	·	11 km	MPC · JPL
17569	1994 LB_{8}	—	June 8, 1994	La Silla	H. Debehogne, E. W. Elst	·	6.6 km	MPC · JPL
17570	1994 NQ	—	July 6, 1994	Palomar	E. F. Helin	PHO	3.6 km	MPC · JPL
17571	1994 PV	—	August 14, 1994	Oizumi	T. Kobayashi	HYG	15 km	MPC · JPL
17572	1994 PX_{11}	—	August 10, 1994	La Silla	E. W. Elst	KOR	5.4 km	MPC · JPL
17573	1994 PJ_{13}	—	August 10, 1994	La Silla	E. W. Elst	THM	10 km	MPC · JPL
17574	1994 PT_{13}	—	August 10, 1994	La Silla	E. W. Elst	·	6.9 km	MPC · JPL
17575	1994 PQ_{14}	—	August 10, 1994	La Silla	E. W. Elst	·	8.7 km	MPC · JPL
17576	1994 PL_{25}	—	August 12, 1994	La Silla	E. W. Elst	EOS	5.4 km	MPC · JPL
17577	1994 PD_{38}	—	August 10, 1994	La Silla	E. W. Elst	·	7.9 km	MPC · JPL
17578	1994 QQ	—	August 16, 1994	Oizumi	T. Kobayashi	·	8.4 km	MPC · JPL
17579 Lewkopelew	1994 TQ_{16}	Lewkopelew	October 5, 1994	Tautenburg Observatory	F. Börngen	V	1.8 km	MPC · JPL
17580	1994 VV	—	November 3, 1994	Oizumi	T. Kobayashi	HNS	5.4 km	MPC · JPL
17581	1994 VE_{1}	—	November 4, 1994	Oizumi	T. Kobayashi	·	4.5 km	MPC · JPL
17582	1994 WL	—	November 25, 1994	Oizumi	T. Kobayashi	V · slow	3.8 km	MPC · JPL
17583	1994 WV_{2}	—	November 30, 1994	Oizumi	T. Kobayashi	·	3.2 km	MPC · JPL
17584	1994 XF_{1}	—	December 6, 1994	Oizumi	T. Kobayashi	·	5.3 km	MPC · JPL
17585	1994 YC_{4}	—	December 31, 1994	Kitt Peak	Spacewatch	NYS	3.5 km	MPC · JPL
17586	1995 AT_{2}	—	January 10, 1995	Oizumi	T. Kobayashi	·	2.1 km	MPC · JPL
17587	1995 BD	—	January 20, 1995	Oizumi	T. Kobayashi	CYB	19 km	MPC · JPL
17588	1995 BH_{2}	—	January 30, 1995	Oizumi	T. Kobayashi	·	2.6 km	MPC · JPL
17589	1995 BR_{10}	—	January 29, 1995	Kitt Peak	Spacewatch	V	2.6 km	MPC · JPL
17590	1995 CG	—	February 1, 1995	Oizumi	T. Kobayashi	H	2.4 km	MPC · JPL
17591	1995 DG	—	February 20, 1995	Oizumi	T. Kobayashi	TIR	8.6 km	MPC · JPL
17592	1995 DR	—	February 22, 1995	Oizumi	T. Kobayashi	·	6.2 km	MPC · JPL
17593	1995 DV	—	February 20, 1995	Oizumi	T. Kobayashi	·	4.1 km	MPC · JPL
17594	1995 DX_{5}	—	February 23, 1995	Kitt Peak	Spacewatch	·	6.6 km	MPC · JPL
17595	1995 EO	—	March 1, 1995	Kleť	Kleť	·	3.3 km	MPC · JPL
17596	1995 EP_{1}	—	March 11, 1995	Oizumi	T. Kobayashi	·	6.3 km	MPC · JPL
17597 Stefanzweig	1995 EK_{8}	Stefanzweig	March 4, 1995	Tautenburg Observatory	F. Börngen	·	5.1 km	MPC · JPL
17598	1995 KE_{2}	—	May 23, 1995	Kiyosato	S. Otomo	·	4.9 km	MPC · JPL
17599	1995 ON_{4}	—	July 22, 1995	Kitt Peak	Spacewatch	·	3.3 km	MPC · JPL
17600 Dobřichovice	1995 SO	Dobřichovice	September 18, 1995	Ondřejov	L. Kotková	·	4.1 km	MPC · JPL

== 17601–17700 ==
back to top

Designation			Discovery			Properties		Ref
Permanent	Provisional	Named after	Date	Site	Discoverer(s)	Category	Diam.	Ref
17601 Sheldonschafer	1995 SS	Sheldonschafer	September 19, 1995	Catalina Station	T. B. Spahr	H	1.9 km	MPC · JPL
17602 Dr. G.	1995 SO_{1}	Stephen Gottesman	September 19, 1995	Catalina Station	T. B. Spahr	·	9.9 km	MPC · JPL
17603 Qoyllurwasi	1995 SG_{5}	Qoyllurwasi	September 20, 1995	Kitami	K. Endate, K. Watanabe	·	9.6 km	MPC · JPL
17604	1995 SO_{26}	—	September 19, 1995	Kitt Peak	Spacewatch	EOS	5.9 km	MPC · JPL
17605	1995 SR_{26}	—	September 19, 1995	Kitt Peak	Spacewatch	KOR	5.0 km	MPC · JPL
17606 Wumengchao	1995 ST_{53}	Wumengchao	September 28, 1995	Xinglong	SCAP	·	8.3 km	MPC · JPL
17607 Táborsko	1995 TC	Táborsko	October 2, 1995	Kleť	M. Tichý, Z. Moravec	KOR	5.0 km	MPC · JPL
17608 Terezín	1995 TN	Terezín	October 12, 1995	Kleť	M. Tichý	·	6.6 km	MPC · JPL
17609	1995 UR	—	October 18, 1995	Catalina Station	T. B. Spahr	PHO	3.9 km	MPC · JPL
17610 Riggsbee	1995 UJ_{1}	Riggsbee	October 23, 1995	Sudbury	D. di Cicco	EOS	9.0 km	MPC · JPL
17611 Jožkakubík	1995 UP_{2}	Jožkakubík	October 24, 1995	Kleť	Kleť	EOS ·	7.9 km	MPC · JPL
17612 Whiteknight	1995 UW_{6}	Whiteknight	October 20, 1995	Chichibu	N. Satō, T. Urata	·	4.9 km	MPC · JPL
17613	1995 UP_{7}	—	October 27, 1995	Kushiro	S. Ueda, H. Kaneda	·	5.1 km	MPC · JPL
17614 Mariamartínez	1995 UT_{7}	Mariamartínez	October 27, 1995	Sormano	P. Sicoli, P. Chiavenna	·	5.4 km	MPC · JPL
17615 Takeomasaru	1995 UZ_{8}	Takeomasaru	October 30, 1995	Kitami	K. Endate, K. Watanabe	·	14 km	MPC · JPL
17616	1995 UE_{15}	—	October 17, 1995	Kitt Peak	Spacewatch	HYG	7.4 km	MPC · JPL
17617 Takimotoikuo	1995 UD_{45}	Takimotoikuo	October 28, 1995	Kitami	K. Endate, K. Watanabe	·	11 km	MPC · JPL
17618	1995 VO	—	November 4, 1995	Oizumi	T. Kobayashi	EOS	9.1 km	MPC · JPL
17619	1995 VT	—	November 1, 1995	Kiyosato	S. Otomo	EOS	11 km	MPC · JPL
17620	1995 WY	—	November 18, 1995	Oizumi	T. Kobayashi	EOS	9.0 km	MPC · JPL
17621	1995 WD_{1}	—	November 16, 1995	Kushiro	S. Ueda, H. Kaneda	·	6.1 km	MPC · JPL
17622	1995 WW_{2}	—	November 20, 1995	Oizumi	T. Kobayashi	·	6.5 km	MPC · JPL
17623	1995 WO_{42}	—	November 30, 1995	Xinglong	SCAP	·	10 km	MPC · JPL
17624	1996 AT	—	January 10, 1996	Oizumi	T. Kobayashi	·	2.8 km	MPC · JPL
17625 Joseflada	1996 AY_{1}	Joseflada	January 14, 1996	Ondřejov	P. Pravec, L. Kotková	·	8.0 km	MPC · JPL
17626	1996 AG_{2}	—	January 12, 1996	Kushiro	S. Ueda, H. Kaneda	·	18 km	MPC · JPL
17627 Humptydumpty	1996 BM_{3}	Humptydumpty	January 27, 1996	Oohira	T. Urata	THM	10 km	MPC · JPL
17628	1996 FB_{5}	—	March 21, 1996	Socorro	Lincoln Lab ETS	·	2.6 km	MPC · JPL
17629 Koichisuzuki	1996 HN_{1}	Koichisuzuki	April 21, 1996	Nanyo	T. Okuni	V	2.2 km	MPC · JPL
17630	1996 HM_{21}	—	April 18, 1996	La Silla	E. W. Elst	·	2.1 km	MPC · JPL
17631	1996 HV_{21}	—	April 21, 1996	Haleakala	NEAT	·	2.2 km	MPC · JPL
17632	1996 HW_{21}	—	April 21, 1996	Haleakala	NEAT	·	3.2 km	MPC · JPL
17633	1996 JU	—	May 11, 1996	Catalina Station	T. B. Spahr	PHO	4.5 km	MPC · JPL
17634	1996 NM_{3}	—	July 14, 1996	La Silla	E. W. Elst	NYS	2.8 km	MPC · JPL
17635	1996 OC_{1}	—	July 20, 1996	Xinglong	SCAP	·	5.0 km	MPC · JPL
17636	1996 PQ	—	August 9, 1996	Haleakala	NEAT	·	2.6 km	MPC · JPL
17637 Blaschke	1996 PA_{1}	Blaschke	August 11, 1996	Prescott	P. G. Comba	V	3.2 km	MPC · JPL
17638 Sualan	1996 PB_{1}	Sualan	August 11, 1996	Rand	G. R. Viscome	NYS	3.6 km	MPC · JPL
17639	1996 PA_{4}	—	August 9, 1996	Haleakala	NEAT	NYS	2.9 km	MPC · JPL
17640 Mount Stromlo	1996 PA_{7}	Mount Stromlo	August 15, 1996	Macquarie	R. H. McNaught, Child, J. B.	·	3.8 km	MPC · JPL
17641	1996 SW_{7}	—	September 18, 1996	Xinglong	SCAP	·	3.2 km	MPC · JPL
17642	1996 TY_{4}	—	October 6, 1996	Rand	G. R. Viscome	EUN	4.2 km	MPC · JPL
17643	1996 TJ_{5}	—	October 9, 1996	Haleakala	NEAT	·	4.4 km	MPC · JPL
17644	1996 TW_{8}	—	October 10, 1996	Catalina Station	T. B. Spahr	HNS	6.4 km	MPC · JPL
17645 Inarimori	1996 TR_{14}	Inarimori	October 9, 1996	Nanyo	T. Okuni	slow	6.4 km	MPC · JPL
17646	1996 TM_{36}	—	October 12, 1996	Kitt Peak	Spacewatch	PHO	3.9 km	MPC · JPL
17647	1996 TR_{41}	—	October 8, 1996	La Silla	E. W. Elst	(5)	4.4 km	MPC · JPL
17648	1996 UU	—	October 16, 1996	Nachi-Katsuura	Y. Shimizu, T. Urata	EUN	4.1 km	MPC · JPL
17649 Brunorossi	1996 UP_{1}	Brunorossi	October 17, 1996	Colleverde	V. S. Casulli	·	4.9 km	MPC · JPL
17650	1996 UH_{5}	—	October 29, 1996	Xinglong	SCAP	·	4.9 km	MPC · JPL
17651 Tajimi	1996 VM_{1}	Tajimi	November 3, 1996	Tajimi	Mizuno, T., T. Furuta	V	4.3 km	MPC · JPL
17652 Nepoti	1996 VQ_{1}	Nepoti	November 3, 1996	Pianoro	V. Goretti	·	10 km	MPC · JPL
17653 Bochner	1996 VM_{2}	Bochner	November 10, 1996	Prescott	P. G. Comba	ADE	8.1 km	MPC · JPL
17654	1996 VK_{3}	—	November 6, 1996	Oizumi	T. Kobayashi	AGN	4.1 km	MPC · JPL
17655	1996 VL_{3}	—	November 6, 1996	Oizumi	T. Kobayashi	·	7.6 km	MPC · JPL
17656 Hayabusa	1996 VL_{4}	Hayabusa	November 6, 1996	Chichibu	N. Satō	·	5.7 km	MPC · JPL
17657 Himawari	1996 VO_{4}	Himawari	November 6, 1996	Chichibu	N. Satō	H	9.0 km	MPC · JPL
17658	1996 VS_{4}	—	November 13, 1996	Oizumi	T. Kobayashi	·	6.4 km	MPC · JPL
17659	1996 VX_{5}	—	November 15, 1996	Oizumi	T. Kobayashi	·	6.3 km	MPC · JPL
17660	1996 VP_{6}	—	November 7, 1996	Church Stretton	S. P. Laurie	·	4.1 km	MPC · JPL
17661	1996 VW_{7}	—	November 3, 1996	Kushiro	S. Ueda, H. Kaneda	·	7.5 km	MPC · JPL
17662	1996 VG_{30}	—	November 7, 1996	Kushiro	S. Ueda, H. Kaneda	·	9.1 km	MPC · JPL
17663	1996 VK_{30}	—	November 7, 1996	Kushiro	S. Ueda, H. Kaneda	·	4.2 km	MPC · JPL
17664	1996 VP_{30}	—	November 7, 1996	Kushiro	S. Ueda, H. Kaneda	·	6.6 km	MPC · JPL
17665	1996 WD	—	November 16, 1996	Oizumi	T. Kobayashi	·	5.6 km	MPC · JPL
17666	1996 XR	—	December 1, 1996	Chichibu	N. Satō	·	3.5 km	MPC · JPL
17667	1996 XT_{5}	—	December 7, 1996	Oizumi	T. Kobayashi	EOS ·	7.0 km	MPC · JPL
17668	1996 XW_{5}	—	December 7, 1996	Oizumi	T. Kobayashi	EOS	8.9 km	MPC · JPL
17669	1996 XF_{6}	—	December 7, 1996	Oizumi	T. Kobayashi	THM	18 km	MPC · JPL
17670 Liddell	1996 XQ_{19}	Liddell	December 8, 1996	Oohira	T. Urata	·	6.2 km	MPC · JPL
17671	1996 XS_{19}	—	December 11, 1996	Oizumi	T. Kobayashi	·	5.8 km	MPC · JPL
17672	1996 XS_{25}	—	December 11, 1996	Saji	Saji	·	10 km	MPC · JPL
17673 Houkidaisen	1996 XL_{32}	Houkidaisen	December 15, 1996	Saji	Saji	HYG	6.6 km	MPC · JPL
17674	1996 YG	—	December 20, 1996	Oizumi	T. Kobayashi	·	6.6 km	MPC · JPL
17675	1996 YU	—	December 20, 1996	Oizumi	T. Kobayashi	AGN	4.2 km	MPC · JPL
17676	1997 AG_{1}	—	January 2, 1997	Oizumi	T. Kobayashi	EOS	7.2 km	MPC · JPL
17677	1997 AW_{2}	—	January 4, 1997	Oizumi	T. Kobayashi	fast	11 km	MPC · JPL
17678	1997 AG_{3}	—	January 3, 1997	Kitt Peak	Spacewatch	·	6.1 km	MPC · JPL
17679	1997 AK_{4}	—	January 6, 1997	Oizumi	T. Kobayashi	·	7.7 km	MPC · JPL
17680	1997 AW_{5}	—	January 1, 1997	Xinglong	SCAP	THM	9.9 km	MPC · JPL
17681 Tweedledum	1997 AQ_{6}	Tweedledum	January 6, 1997	Oohira	T. Urata	H	2.4 km	MPC · JPL
17682	1997 AR_{12}	—	January 10, 1997	Oizumi	T. Kobayashi	EOS	7.6 km	MPC · JPL
17683 Kanagawa	1997 AR_{16}	Kanagawa	January 10, 1997	Hadano Obs.	A. Asami	·	17 km	MPC · JPL
17684	1997 AS_{16}	—	January 14, 1997	Oizumi	T. Kobayashi	·	5.4 km	MPC · JPL
17685	1997 AJ_{19}	—	January 13, 1997	Nanyo	T. Okuni	·	7.2 km	MPC · JPL
17686	1997 BC_{2}	—	January 29, 1997	Oizumi	T. Kobayashi	EOS	11 km	MPC · JPL
17687	1997 BN_{2}	—	January 30, 1997	Oizumi	T. Kobayashi	EOS	6.1 km	MPC · JPL
17688	1997 BM_{3}	—	January 31, 1997	Oizumi	T. Kobayashi	DOR	8.5 km	MPC · JPL
17689	1997 CS	—	February 1, 1997	Oizumi	T. Kobayashi	slow	9.4 km	MPC · JPL
17690	1997 CY_{2}	—	February 3, 1997	Oizumi	T. Kobayashi	·	9.8 km	MPC · JPL
17691	1997 CF_{17}	—	February 1, 1997	Kitt Peak	Spacewatch	HYG	8.6 km	MPC · JPL
17692	1997 CX_{27}	—	February 6, 1997	Xinglong	SCAP	HYG	10 km	MPC · JPL
17693 Wangdaheng	1997 CP_{28}	Wangdaheng	February 15, 1997	Xinglong	SCAP	EOS	6.0 km	MPC · JPL
17694 Jiránek	1997 ET_{1}	Jiránek	March 4, 1997	Kleť	M. Tichý, Z. Moravec	KOR	6.0 km	MPC · JPL
17695	1997 EE_{7}	—	March 3, 1997	Kitt Peak	Spacewatch	·	6.5 km	MPC · JPL
17696 Bombelli	1997 EH_{8}	Bombelli	March 8, 1997	Prescott	P. G. Comba	EOS	7.8 km	MPC · JPL
17697 Evanchen	1997 EQ_{41}	Evanchen	March 10, 1997	Socorro	LINEAR	EOS	6.8 km	MPC · JPL
17698 Racheldavis	1997 EW_{42}	Racheldavis	March 10, 1997	Socorro	LINEAR	·	12 km	MPC · JPL
17699	1997 GX_{7}	—	April 2, 1997	Socorro	LINEAR	THM	9.4 km	MPC · JPL
17700 Oleksiygolubov	1997 GM_{40}	Oleksiygolubov	April 7, 1997	La Silla	E. W. Elst	moon	3.4 km	MPC · JPL

== 17701–17800 ==
back to top

Designation			Discovery			Properties		Ref
Permanent	Provisional	Named after	Date	Site	Discoverer(s)	Category	Diam.	Ref
17701	1997 GU_{41}	—	April 9, 1997	La Silla	E. W. Elst	VER	10 km	MPC · JPL
17702 Kryštofharant	1997 JD	Kryštofharant	May 1, 1997	Ondřejov	P. Pravec	EOS	6.6 km	MPC · JPL
17703 Bombieri	1997 RS_{5}	Bombieri	September 9, 1997	Prescott	P. G. Comba	·	1.6 km	MPC · JPL
17704	1997 UM_{5}	—	October 21, 1997	Kitt Peak	Spacewatch	·	2.3 km	MPC · JPL
17705	1997 UM_{24}	—	October 28, 1997	Xinglong	SCAP	·	4.3 km	MPC · JPL
17706	1997 VA_{6}	—	November 9, 1997	Oizumi	T. Kobayashi	slow	3.4 km	MPC · JPL
17707	1997 VM_{7}	—	November 2, 1997	Xinglong	SCAP	·	2.8 km	MPC · JPL
17708	1997 WB	—	November 18, 1997	Woomera	F. B. Zoltowski	·	1.7 km	MPC · JPL
17709	1997 WV_{1}	—	November 19, 1997	Oizumi	T. Kobayashi	·	2.7 km	MPC · JPL
17710	1997 WT_{2}	—	November 23, 1997	Oizumi	T. Kobayashi	V	2.4 km	MPC · JPL
17711	1997 WA_{7}	—	November 23, 1997	Kitt Peak	Spacewatch	·	9.1 km	MPC · JPL
17712 Fatherwilliam	1997 WK_{7}	Fatherwilliam	November 19, 1997	Nachi-Katsuura	Y. Shimizu, T. Urata	·	4.4 km	MPC · JPL
17713	1997 WJ_{20}	—	November 25, 1997	Kitt Peak	Spacewatch	·	2.6 km	MPC · JPL
17714	1997 WR_{38}	—	November 29, 1997	Socorro	LINEAR	·	3.2 km	MPC · JPL
17715	1997 WZ_{39}	—	November 29, 1997	Socorro	LINEAR	·	5.3 km	MPC · JPL
17716	1997 WW_{43}	—	November 29, 1997	Socorro	LINEAR	·	2.1 km	MPC · JPL
17717	1997 XL	—	December 3, 1997	Oizumi	T. Kobayashi	(2076)	3.4 km	MPC · JPL
17718	1997 XZ	—	December 3, 1997	Oizumi	T. Kobayashi	NYS ·	5.7 km	MPC · JPL
17719	1997 XV_{1}	—	December 2, 1997	Nachi-Katsuura	Y. Shimizu, T. Urata	V	2.4 km	MPC · JPL
17720 Manuboccuni	1997 XH_{10}	Manuboccuni	December 7, 1997	Cima Ekar	M. Tombelli	·	3.6 km	MPC · JPL
17721	1997 XT_{10}	—	December 10, 1997	Xinglong	SCAP	·	6.3 km	MPC · JPL
17722	1997 YT_{1}	—	December 21, 1997	Xinglong	SCAP	PHO	5.3 km	MPC · JPL
17723	1997 YA_{4}	—	December 22, 1997	Xinglong	SCAP	·	2.9 km	MPC · JPL
17724	1997 YZ_{5}	—	December 25, 1997	Oizumi	T. Kobayashi	·	2.0 km	MPC · JPL
17725	1997 YQ_{7}	—	December 27, 1997	Oizumi	T. Kobayashi	EUN	6.4 km	MPC · JPL
17726	1997 YS_{10}	—	December 22, 1997	Xinglong	SCAP	·	3.9 km	MPC · JPL
17727	1997 YU_{11}	—	December 30, 1997	Oizumi	T. Kobayashi	·	3.8 km	MPC · JPL
17728	1997 YM_{12}	—	December 21, 1997	Kitt Peak	Spacewatch	NYS ·	5.7 km	MPC · JPL
17729	1997 YW_{14}	—	December 28, 1997	Kitt Peak	Spacewatch	·	3.7 km	MPC · JPL
17730	1998 AS_{4}	—	January 6, 1998	Kitt Peak	Spacewatch	·	6.9 km	MPC · JPL
17731	1998 AD_{10}	—	January 15, 1998	Caussols	ODAS	·	2.1 km	MPC · JPL
17732	1998 AQ_{10}	—	January 1, 1998	Kitt Peak	Spacewatch	·	3.3 km	MPC · JPL
17733	1998 BS_{1}	—	January 19, 1998	Oizumi	T. Kobayashi	·	11 km	MPC · JPL
17734 Boole	1998 BW_{3}	Boole	January 22, 1998	Prescott	P. G. Comba	·	4.0 km	MPC · JPL
17735	1998 BG_{7}	—	January 24, 1998	Haleakala	NEAT	·	2.8 km	MPC · JPL
17736 Zhifeiyu	1998 BA_{12}	Zhifeiyu	January 23, 1998	Socorro	LINEAR	·	8.6 km	MPC · JPL
17737 Sigmundjähn	1998 BF_{14}	Sigmundjähn	January 27, 1998	Drebach	J. Kandler	·	5.2 km	MPC · JPL
17738	1998 BS_{15}	—	January 24, 1998	Haleakala	NEAT	·	6.1 km	MPC · JPL
17739	1998 BY_{15}	—	January 25, 1998	Haleakala	NEAT	·	4.9 km	MPC · JPL
17740	1998 BC_{19}	—	January 27, 1998	Sormano	A. Testa, Ghezzi, P.	·	7.3 km	MPC · JPL
17741	1998 BS_{23}	—	January 26, 1998	Kitt Peak	Spacewatch	·	3.6 km	MPC · JPL
17742	1998 BP_{25}	—	January 28, 1998	Oizumi	T. Kobayashi	THM	12 km	MPC · JPL
17743	1998 BA_{31}	—	January 26, 1998	Kitt Peak	Spacewatch	·	3.2 km	MPC · JPL
17744 Jodiefoster	1998 BZ_{31}	Jodiefoster	January 18, 1998	Caussols	ODAS	·	2.1 km	MPC · JPL
17745	1998 BG_{34}	—	January 22, 1998	Kitt Peak	Spacewatch	·	4.2 km	MPC · JPL
17746 Haigha	1998 BU_{41}	Haigha	January 30, 1998	Gekko	T. Kagawa, T. Urata	·	6.1 km	MPC · JPL
17747	1998 BJ_{42}	—	January 26, 1998	Xinglong	SCAP	·	2.7 km	MPC · JPL
17748 Uedashoji	1998 CL	Uedashoji	February 1, 1998	Saji	Saji	·	3.3 km	MPC · JPL
17749 Dulbecco	1998 DW_{1}	Dulbecco	February 19, 1998	Farra d'Isonzo	Farra d'Isonzo	·	4.8 km	MPC · JPL
17750	1998 DZ_{1}	—	February 18, 1998	Woomera	F. B. Zoltowski	·	6.2 km	MPC · JPL
17751	1998 DN_{3}	—	February 22, 1998	Haleakala	NEAT	·	10 km	MPC · JPL
17752	1998 DM_{4}	—	February 22, 1998	Haleakala	NEAT	·	4.1 km	MPC · JPL
17753	1998 DZ_{5}	—	February 22, 1998	Haleakala	NEAT	·	4.0 km	MPC · JPL
17754	1998 DN_{8}	—	February 21, 1998	Xinglong	SCAP	EMA	14 km	MPC · JPL
17755	1998 DU_{11}	—	February 24, 1998	Haleakala	NEAT	·	11 km	MPC · JPL
17756	1998 DM_{13}	—	February 25, 1998	Haleakala	NEAT	·	4.9 km	MPC · JPL
17757	1998 DG_{15}	—	February 22, 1998	Haleakala	NEAT	·	5.8 km	MPC · JPL
17758	1998 DC_{18}	—	February 23, 1998	Kitt Peak	Spacewatch	AGN	4.1 km	MPC · JPL
17759 Hatta	1998 DA_{24}	Hatta	February 17, 1998	Nachi-Katsuura	Y. Shimizu, T. Urata	·	5.4 km	MPC · JPL
17760	1998 DU_{33}	—	February 27, 1998	La Silla	E. W. Elst	MAS	2.9 km	MPC · JPL
17761	1998 DV_{34}	—	February 27, 1998	La Silla	E. W. Elst	AGN	3.6 km	MPC · JPL
17762	1998 DY_{34}	—	February 27, 1998	La Silla	E. W. Elst	KOR	5.9 km	MPC · JPL
17763	1998 EG	—	March 1, 1998	Caussols	ODAS	·	4.4 km	MPC · JPL
17764 Schatzman	1998 ES_{1}	Schatzman	March 2, 1998	Caussols	ODAS	(5)	4.0 km	MPC · JPL
17765	1998 EZ_{2}	—	March 1, 1998	Xinglong	SCAP	·	4.9 km	MPC · JPL
17766	1998 ES_{3}	—	March 2, 1998	Oizumi	T. Kobayashi	EUN	5.8 km	MPC · JPL
17767	1998 EJ_{6}	—	March 1, 1998	Caussols	ODAS	slow	7.2 km	MPC · JPL
17768 Tigerlily	1998 EO_{8}	Tigerlily	March 3, 1998	Oohira	T. Urata	TEL	5.4 km	MPC · JPL
17769	1998 EM_{9}	—	March 15, 1998	Oizumi	T. Kobayashi	·	5.6 km	MPC · JPL
17770 Baumé	1998 EU_{11}	Baumé	March 1, 1998	La Silla	E. W. Elst	·	5.7 km	MPC · JPL
17771 Elsheimer	1998 EA_{13}	Elsheimer	March 1, 1998	La Silla	E. W. Elst	THM	8.7 km	MPC · JPL
17772	1998 EP_{13}	—	March 1, 1998	La Silla	E. W. Elst	KOR	6.4 km	MPC · JPL
17773	1998 EX_{13}	—	March 1, 1998	La Silla	E. W. Elst	·	15 km	MPC · JPL
17774	1998 ER_{14}	—	March 1, 1998	La Silla	E. W. Elst	·	3.5 km	MPC · JPL
17775	1998 FH	—	March 18, 1998	Woomera	F. B. Zoltowski	·	5.5 km	MPC · JPL
17776 Troska	1998 FF_{3}	Troska	March 22, 1998	Ondřejov	P. Pravec	·	4.7 km	MPC · JPL
17777 Ornicar	1998 FV_{9}	Ornicar	March 24, 1998	Caussols	ODAS	·	3.1 km	MPC · JPL
17778	1998 FT_{11}	—	March 24, 1998	Haleakala	NEAT	·	5.3 km	MPC · JPL
17779 Migomueller	1998 FK_{12}	Migomueller	March 26, 1998	Caussols	ODAS	KOR	6.6 km	MPC · JPL
17780	1998 FY_{13}	—	March 24, 1998	Haleakala	NEAT	EOS	8.8 km	MPC · JPL
17781 Kepping	1998 FH_{23}	Kepping	March 20, 1998	Socorro	LINEAR	·	3.5 km	MPC · JPL
17782 Paulbailey	1998 FD_{26}	Paulbailey	March 20, 1998	Socorro	LINEAR	·	4.6 km	MPC · JPL
17783 Scottbrunner	1998 FO_{29}	Scottbrunner	March 20, 1998	Socorro	LINEAR	·	4.9 km	MPC · JPL
17784 Banerjee	1998 FF_{30}	Banerjee	March 20, 1998	Socorro	LINEAR	·	4.2 km	MPC · JPL
17785 Wesleyfuller	1998 FX_{35}	Wesleyfuller	March 20, 1998	Socorro	LINEAR	·	3.3 km	MPC · JPL
17786	1998 FL_{36}	—	March 20, 1998	Socorro	LINEAR	·	16 km	MPC · JPL
17787	1998 FT_{39}	—	March 20, 1998	Socorro	LINEAR	·	7.3 km	MPC · JPL
17788	1998 FT_{41}	—	March 20, 1998	Socorro	LINEAR	EOS	8.7 km	MPC · JPL
17789 Carolcarty	1998 FJ_{49}	Carolcarty	March 20, 1998	Socorro	LINEAR	·	5.1 km	MPC · JPL
17790	1998 FN_{49}	—	March 20, 1998	Socorro	LINEAR	·	11 km	MPC · JPL
17791	1998 FN_{54}	—	March 20, 1998	Socorro	LINEAR	·	5.7 km	MPC · JPL
17792 Kathconnelly	1998 FR_{56}	Kathconnelly	March 20, 1998	Socorro	LINEAR	(194)	9.5 km	MPC · JPL
17793 Delorio	1998 FO_{58}	Delorio	March 20, 1998	Socorro	LINEAR	EUN	5.4 km	MPC · JPL
17794 Kowalinski	1998 FC_{60}	Kowalinski	March 20, 1998	Socorro	LINEAR	KOR	4.4 km	MPC · JPL
17795 Elysiasegal	1998 FJ_{61}	Elysiasegal	March 20, 1998	Socorro	LINEAR	NYS	5.0 km	MPC · JPL
17796	1998 FM_{62}	—	March 20, 1998	Socorro	LINEAR	WAT	9.8 km	MPC · JPL
17797 Philfrankel	1998 FO_{62}	Philfrankel	March 20, 1998	Socorro	LINEAR	·	12 km	MPC · JPL
17798	1998 FC_{63}	—	March 20, 1998	Socorro	LINEAR	·	12 km	MPC · JPL
17799 Petewilliams	1998 FC_{64}	Petewilliams	March 20, 1998	Socorro	LINEAR	NEM	8.6 km	MPC · JPL
17800	1998 FG_{66}	—	March 20, 1998	Socorro	LINEAR	EOS	9.9 km	MPC · JPL

== 17801–17900 ==
back to top

Designation			Discovery			Properties		Ref
Permanent	Provisional	Named after	Date	Site	Discoverer(s)	Category	Diam.	Ref
17801 Zelkowitz	1998 FH_{69}	Zelkowitz	March 20, 1998	Socorro	LINEAR	THM	8.1 km	MPC · JPL
17802	1998 FA_{71}	—	March 20, 1998	Socorro	LINEAR	·	16 km	MPC · JPL
17803 Barish	1998 FD_{71}	Barish	March 20, 1998	Socorro	LINEAR	·	3.0 km	MPC · JPL
17804	1998 FH_{71}	—	March 20, 1998	Socorro	LINEAR	EOS	8.4 km	MPC · JPL
17805 Švestka	1998 FV_{72}	Švestka	March 30, 1998	Kleť	M. Tichý, Z. Moravec	EOS	6.0 km	MPC · JPL
17806 Adolfborn	1998 FO_{73}	Adolfborn	March 31, 1998	Ondřejov	P. Pravec	·	3.2 km	MPC · JPL
17807 Ericpearce	1998 FT_{74}	Ericpearce	March 19, 1998	Anderson Mesa	LONEOS	·	10 km	MPC · JPL
17808	1998 FV_{74}	—	March 24, 1998	Socorro	LINEAR	EOS ·	6.1 km	MPC · JPL
17809	1998 FR_{78}	—	March 24, 1998	Socorro	LINEAR	·	16 km	MPC · JPL
17810 Brittholden	1998 FM_{100}	Brittholden	March 31, 1998	Socorro	LINEAR	EUN	7.0 km	MPC · JPL
17811	1998 FH_{105}	—	March 31, 1998	Socorro	LINEAR	·	12 km	MPC · JPL
17812	1998 FH_{109}	—	March 31, 1998	Socorro	LINEAR	·	14 km	MPC · JPL
17813 Alisonhuenger	1998 FL_{109}	Alisonhuenger	March 31, 1998	Socorro	LINEAR	EOS	7.1 km	MPC · JPL
17814	1998 FH_{113}	—	March 31, 1998	Socorro	LINEAR	EOS	13 km	MPC · JPL
17815 Kulawik	1998 FM_{113}	Kulawik	March 31, 1998	Socorro	LINEAR	V	2.5 km	MPC · JPL
17816	1998 FY_{113}	—	March 31, 1998	Socorro	LINEAR	·	14 km	MPC · JPL
17817	1998 FU_{116}	—	March 31, 1998	Socorro	LINEAR	EOS	10 km	MPC · JPL
17818	1998 FE_{118}	—	March 31, 1998	Socorro	LINEAR	·	7.5 km	MPC · JPL
17819	1998 FK_{118}	—	March 31, 1998	Socorro	LINEAR	·	9.4 km	MPC · JPL
17820	1998 FZ_{125}	—	March 31, 1998	Socorro	LINEAR	·	7.7 km	MPC · JPL
17821 Bölsche	1998 FC_{127}	Bölsche	March 31, 1998	Drebach	~Knöfel, A., J. Kandler	V	2.1 km	MPC · JPL
17822 Tonireland	1998 FM_{135}	Tonireland	March 22, 1998	Socorro	LINEAR	HYG	11 km	MPC · JPL
17823 Bartels	1998 GA	Bartels	April 1, 1998	Oaxaca	Roe, J. M.	·	5.5 km	MPC · JPL
17824	1998 GF	—	April 2, 1998	Socorro	LINEAR	H	2.1 km	MPC · JPL
17825 Juranitch	1998 GQ_{8}	Juranitch	April 2, 1998	Socorro	LINEAR	(5651)	13 km	MPC · JPL
17826 Normanwisdom	1998 GK_{10}	Normanwisdom	April 3, 1998	Reedy Creek	J. Broughton	·	8.0 km	MPC · JPL
17827	1998 HW	—	April 17, 1998	Kitt Peak	Spacewatch	·	6.2 km	MPC · JPL
17828	1998 HK_{8}	—	April 22, 1998	Woomera	F. B. Zoltowski	·	4.4 km	MPC · JPL
17829	1998 HX_{32}	—	April 20, 1998	Socorro	LINEAR	·	11 km	MPC · JPL
17830 Andreajurgens	1998 HR_{35}	Andreajurgens	April 20, 1998	Socorro	LINEAR	KOR	5.9 km	MPC · JPL
17831 Ussery	1998 HW_{35}	Ussery	April 20, 1998	Socorro	LINEAR	·	4.2 km	MPC · JPL
17832 Pitman	1998 HV_{39}	Pitman	April 20, 1998	Socorro	LINEAR	KOR	4.9 km	MPC · JPL
17833	1998 HO_{42}	—	April 23, 1998	Haleakala	NEAT	GEF ·	5.8 km	MPC · JPL
17834	1998 HL_{43}	—	April 25, 1998	Višnjan Observatory	Višnjan	EOS	8.6 km	MPC · JPL
17835 Anoelsuri	1998 HS_{46}	Anoelsuri	April 20, 1998	Socorro	LINEAR	NYS	3.4 km	MPC · JPL
17836 Canup	1998 HT_{50}	Canup	April 25, 1998	Anderson Mesa	LONEOS	EUN	4.4 km	MPC · JPL
17837	1998 HQ_{92}	—	April 21, 1998	Socorro	LINEAR	·	7.9 km	MPC · JPL
17838	1998 HJ_{94}	—	April 21, 1998	Socorro	LINEAR	URS	15 km	MPC · JPL
17839	1998 HN_{95}	—	April 21, 1998	Socorro	LINEAR	·	21 km	MPC · JPL
17840	1998 HG_{96}	—	April 21, 1998	Socorro	LINEAR	LUT	18 km	MPC · JPL
17841 Karenlucci	1998 HZ_{96}	Karenlucci	April 21, 1998	Socorro	LINEAR	·	5.4 km	MPC · JPL
17842 Jorgegarcia	1998 HN_{98}	Jorgegarcia	April 21, 1998	Socorro	LINEAR	·	4.7 km	MPC · JPL
17843 Shaelucero	1998 HD_{99}	Shaelucero	April 21, 1998	Socorro	LINEAR	THM	11 km	MPC · JPL
17844 Judson	1998 HM_{100}	Judson	April 21, 1998	Socorro	LINEAR	KOR	5.4 km	MPC · JPL
17845	1998 HY_{112}	—	April 23, 1998	Socorro	LINEAR	·	10 km	MPC · JPL
17846	1998 HB_{115}	—	April 23, 1998	Socorro	LINEAR	EUN	6.9 km	MPC · JPL
17847	1998 HQ_{115}	—	April 23, 1998	Socorro	LINEAR	slow	5.4 km	MPC · JPL
17848 Mordechai	1998 HR_{133}	Mordechai	April 19, 1998	Socorro	LINEAR	·	9.1 km	MPC · JPL
17849	1998 HL_{134}	—	April 19, 1998	Socorro	LINEAR	·	16 km	MPC · JPL
17850	1998 HR_{150}	—	April 20, 1998	Kitt Peak	Spacewatch	EUN	5.0 km	MPC · JPL
17851 Kaler	1998 JK	Kaler	May 1, 1998	Haleakala	NEAT	NYS	4.9 km	MPC · JPL
17852	1998 JN_{1}	—	May 1, 1998	Haleakala	NEAT	PHO	3.9 km	MPC · JPL
17853 Ronaldsayer	1998 JK_{3}	Ronaldsayer	May 1, 1998	Anderson Mesa	LONEOS	HYG	12 km	MPC · JPL
17854	1998 JC_{4}	—	May 5, 1998	Woomera	F. B. Zoltowski	EOS	10 km	MPC · JPL
17855 Geffert	1998 KK	Geffert	May 19, 1998	Starkenburg Observatory	Starkenburg	·	15 km	MPC · JPL
17856 Gomes	1998 KL_{1}	Gomes	May 18, 1998	Anderson Mesa	LONEOS	·	3.9 km	MPC · JPL
17857 Hsieh	1998 KR_{1}	Hsieh	May 18, 1998	Anderson Mesa	LONEOS	EUN	6.5 km	MPC · JPL
17858 Beaugé	1998 KS_{3}	Beaugé	May 22, 1998	Anderson Mesa	LONEOS	·	3.4 km	MPC · JPL
17859 Galinaryabova	1998 KC_{4}	Galinaryabova	May 22, 1998	Anderson Mesa	LONEOS	EOS	13 km	MPC · JPL
17860 Roig	1998 KQ_{4}	Roig	May 22, 1998	Anderson Mesa	LONEOS	·	3.7 km	MPC · JPL
17861	1998 KN_{24}	—	May 22, 1998	Socorro	LINEAR	URS	17 km	MPC · JPL
17862	1998 KT_{28}	—	May 22, 1998	Socorro	LINEAR	EOS	8.7 km	MPC · JPL
17863	1998 KN_{30}	—	May 22, 1998	Socorro	LINEAR	EOS	9.3 km	MPC · JPL
17864	1998 KK_{38}	—	May 22, 1998	Socorro	LINEAR	EOS	10 km	MPC · JPL
17865 Odden	1998 KS_{39}	Odden	May 22, 1998	Socorro	LINEAR	KOR	5.7 km	MPC · JPL
17866	1998 KV_{45}	—	May 22, 1998	Socorro	LINEAR	·	15 km	MPC · JPL
17867	1998 KD_{46}	—	May 22, 1998	Socorro	LINEAR	3:2	19 km	MPC · JPL
17868	1998 KW_{46}	—	May 22, 1998	Socorro	LINEAR	·	15 km	MPC · JPL
17869 Descamps	1998 MA_{14}	Descamps	June 20, 1998	Caussols	ODAS	·	2.6 km	MPC · JPL
17870 Pannett	1998 QU_{92}	Pannett	August 28, 1998	Socorro	LINEAR	·	4.1 km	MPC · JPL
17871	1998 RD_{58}	—	September 14, 1998	Socorro	LINEAR	CYB	24 km	MPC · JPL
17872	1998 SP_{22}	—	September 23, 1998	Višnjan Observatory	Višnjan	·	6.7 km	MPC · JPL
17873 Palaciosdeborao	1998 XO_{96}	Palaciosdeborao	December 11, 1998	Mérida	Naranjo, O. A.	·	4.0 km	MPC · JPL
17874	1998 YM_{3}	—	December 17, 1998	Oizumi	T. Kobayashi	L4	17 km	MPC · JPL
17875	1999 AQ_{2}	—	January 9, 1999	Oizumi	T. Kobayashi	(2076)	3.5 km	MPC · JPL
17876	1999 AX_{21}	—	January 15, 1999	Višnjan Observatory	K. Korlević	·	7.9 km	MPC · JPL
17877	1999 AZ_{22}	—	January 15, 1999	Oizumi	T. Kobayashi	V	4.5 km	MPC · JPL
17878	1999 AR_{25}	—	January 15, 1999	Caussols	ODAS	NYS	2.8 km	MPC · JPL
17879 Robutel	1999 BA_{14}	Robutel	January 22, 1999	Caussols	ODAS	·	2.6 km	MPC · JPL
17880 Vanessaparker	1999 BA_{24}	Vanessaparker	January 18, 1999	Socorro	LINEAR	EOS	6.7 km	MPC · JPL
17881 Radmall	1999 CA_{51}	Radmall	February 10, 1999	Socorro	LINEAR	·	6.0 km	MPC · JPL
17882 Thielemann	1999 CX_{87}	Thielemann	February 10, 1999	Socorro	LINEAR	·	2.7 km	MPC · JPL
17883 Scobuchanan	1999 CP_{105}	Scobuchanan	February 12, 1999	Socorro	LINEAR	·	3.2 km	MPC · JPL
17884 Jeffthompson	1999 CD_{116}	Jeffthompson	February 12, 1999	Socorro	LINEAR	·	2.8 km	MPC · JPL
17885 Brianbeyt	1999 CF_{118}	Brianbeyt	February 12, 1999	Socorro	LINEAR	RAF	3.1 km	MPC · JPL
17886 Ramazan	1999 CH_{118}	Ramazan	February 12, 1999	Socorro	LINEAR	·	3.0 km	MPC · JPL
17887	1999 DE_{1}	—	February 17, 1999	Caussols	ODAS	·	2.3 km	MPC · JPL
17888	1999 DB_{3}	—	February 21, 1999	Oizumi	T. Kobayashi	EUN	5.1 km	MPC · JPL
17889 Liechty	1999 DH_{3}	Liechty	February 20, 1999	Socorro	LINEAR	·	3.5 km	MPC · JPL
17890	1999 DU_{6}	—	February 20, 1999	Socorro	LINEAR	·	8.4 km	MPC · JPL
17891 Buraliforti	1999 EA	Buraliforti	March 6, 1999	Prescott	P. G. Comba	·	3.9 km	MPC · JPL
17892 Morecambewise	1999 EO_{5}	Morecambewise	March 15, 1999	Reedy Creek	J. Broughton	·	2.0 km	MPC · JPL
17893 Arlot	1999 FO	Arlot	March 17, 1999	Caussols	ODAS	(1338) (FLO)	3.3 km	MPC · JPL
17894	1999 FP	—	March 17, 1999	Caussols	ODAS	PAD	9.8 km	MPC · JPL
17895	1999 FZ_{2}	—	March 17, 1999	Kitt Peak	Spacewatch	·	2.6 km	MPC · JPL
17896	1999 FW_{4}	—	March 17, 1999	Kitt Peak	Spacewatch	·	3.1 km	MPC · JPL
17897 Gallardo	1999 FV_{8}	Gallardo	March 19, 1999	Anderson Mesa	LONEOS	MAS	2.9 km	MPC · JPL
17898 Scottsheppard	1999 FB_{19}	Scottsheppard	March 22, 1999	Anderson Mesa	LONEOS	·	4.9 km	MPC · JPL
17899 Mariacristina	1999 FD_{19}	Mariacristina	March 22, 1999	Anderson Mesa	LONEOS	·	3.2 km	MPC · JPL
17900 Leiferman	1999 FO_{24}	Leiferman	March 19, 1999	Socorro	LINEAR	·	2.3 km	MPC · JPL

== 17901–18000 ==
back to top

Designation			Discovery			Properties		Ref
Permanent	Provisional	Named after	Date	Site	Discoverer(s)	Category	Diam.	Ref
17901 Korinriske	1999 FT_{25}	Korinriske	March 19, 1999	Socorro	LINEAR	·	7.3 km	MPC · JPL
17902 Britbaker	1999 FM_{26}	Britbaker	March 19, 1999	Socorro	LINEAR	·	3.4 km	MPC · JPL
17903 Shamieh	1999 FS_{27}	Shamieh	March 19, 1999	Socorro	LINEAR	·	5.4 km	MPC · JPL
17904 Annekoupal	1999 FW_{30}	Annekoupal	March 19, 1999	Socorro	LINEAR	(1338) (FLO)	2.5 km	MPC · JPL
17905 Kabtamu	1999 FM_{31}	Kabtamu	March 19, 1999	Socorro	LINEAR	NYS	3.2 km	MPC · JPL
17906 Shapovalov	1999 FG_{32}	Shapovalov	March 19, 1999	Socorro	LINEAR	·	7.5 km	MPC · JPL
17907 Danielgude	1999 FQ_{33}	Danielgude	March 19, 1999	Socorro	LINEAR	·	3.8 km	MPC · JPL
17908 Chriskuyu	1999 FL_{34}	Chriskuyu	March 19, 1999	Socorro	LINEAR	·	2.0 km	MPC · JPL
17909 Nikhilshukla	1999 FC_{35}	Nikhilshukla	March 19, 1999	Socorro	LINEAR	·	6.1 km	MPC · JPL
17910 Munyan	1999 FG_{37}	Munyan	March 20, 1999	Socorro	LINEAR	·	6.0 km	MPC · JPL
17911 Robertsnyder	1999 FF_{41}	Robertsnyder	March 20, 1999	Socorro	LINEAR	·	2.1 km	MPC · JPL
17912	1999 FV_{44}	—	March 20, 1999	Socorro	LINEAR	·	3.8 km	MPC · JPL
17913 Strode	1999 FT_{52}	Strode	March 20, 1999	Socorro	LINEAR	·	3.5 km	MPC · JPL
17914 Joannelee	1999 FA_{54}	Joannelee	March 20, 1999	Socorro	LINEAR	·	2.5 km	MPC · JPL
17915	1999 GU	—	April 5, 1999	Višnjan Observatory	K. Korlević	·	2.0 km	MPC · JPL
17916	1999 GZ_{3}	—	April 10, 1999	Woomera	F. B. Zoltowski	·	2.1 km	MPC · JPL
17917 Cartan	1999 GN_{5}	Cartan	April 15, 1999	Prescott	P. G. Comba	·	4.5 km	MPC · JPL
17918	1999 GE_{6}	—	April 14, 1999	Nachi-Katsuura	Y. Shimizu, T. Urata	·	12 km	MPC · JPL
17919 Licandro	1999 GC_{8}	Licandro	April 9, 1999	Anderson Mesa	LONEOS	·	3.0 km	MPC · JPL
17920 Zarnecki	1999 GE_{9}	Zarnecki	April 10, 1999	Anderson Mesa	LONEOS	V	2.2 km	MPC · JPL
17921 Aldeobaldia	1999 GC_{13}	Aldeobaldia	April 15, 1999	Socorro	LINEAR	V · slow	2.6 km	MPC · JPL
17922	1999 GS_{13}	—	April 12, 1999	Kitt Peak	Spacewatch	PHO	4.2 km	MPC · JPL
17923 Strother	1999 GY_{16}	Strother	April 15, 1999	Socorro	LINEAR	V	3.6 km	MPC · JPL
17924	1999 GA_{17}	—	April 15, 1999	Socorro	LINEAR	·	4.3 km	MPC · JPL
17925 Dougweinberg	1999 GQ_{17}	Dougweinberg	April 15, 1999	Socorro	LINEAR	NYS	2.9 km	MPC · JPL
17926 Jameswu	1999 GA_{18}	Jameswu	April 15, 1999	Socorro	LINEAR	·	3.3 km	MPC · JPL
17927 Ghoshal	1999 GL_{20}	Ghoshal	April 15, 1999	Socorro	LINEAR	·	2.2 km	MPC · JPL
17928 Neuwirth	1999 GJ_{21}	Neuwirth	April 15, 1999	Socorro	LINEAR	V	4.3 km	MPC · JPL
17929 Sully	1999 GQ_{21}	Sully	April 15, 1999	Socorro	LINEAR	·	5.4 km	MPC · JPL
17930 Kennethott	1999 GE_{24}	Kennethott	April 6, 1999	Socorro	LINEAR	·	3.2 km	MPC · JPL
17931	1999 GA_{27}	—	April 7, 1999	Socorro	LINEAR	THM	8.4 km	MPC · JPL
17932 Viswanathan	1999 GA_{35}	Viswanathan	April 6, 1999	Socorro	LINEAR	·	3.2 km	MPC · JPL
17933 Haraguchi	1999 GM_{36}	Haraguchi	April 12, 1999	Socorro	LINEAR	·	2.1 km	MPC · JPL
17934 Deleon	1999 GK_{39}	Deleon	April 12, 1999	Socorro	LINEAR	·	2.5 km	MPC · JPL
17935 Vinhoward	1999 GX_{45}	Vinhoward	April 12, 1999	Socorro	LINEAR	·	3.2 km	MPC · JPL
17936 Nilus	1999 HE_{3}	Nilus	April 24, 1999	Reedy Creek	J. Broughton	·	2.8 km	MPC · JPL
17937	1999 HO_{4}	—	April 16, 1999	Kitt Peak	Spacewatch	·	7.1 km	MPC · JPL
17938 Tamsendrew	1999 HW_{6}	Tamsendrew	April 17, 1999	Socorro	LINEAR	·	3.2 km	MPC · JPL
17939 Shanethread	1999 HH_{8}	Shanethread	April 16, 1999	Socorro	LINEAR	·	5.1 km	MPC · JPL
17940 Kandyjarvis	1999 JK_{2}	Kandyjarvis	May 8, 1999	Catalina	CSS	·	1.8 km	MPC · JPL
17941 Horbatt	1999 JW_{2}	Horbatt	May 6, 1999	Goodricke-Pigott	R. A. Tucker	·	3.3 km	MPC · JPL
17942 Whiterabbit	1999 JG_{6}	Whiterabbit	May 11, 1999	Nachi-Katsuura	Y. Shimizu, T. Urata	·	2.8 km	MPC · JPL
17943	1999 JZ_{6}	—	May 8, 1999	Catalina	CSS	V	2.0 km	MPC · JPL
17944 Lansbury	1999 JF_{7}	Lansbury	May 8, 1999	Catalina	CSS	·	7.7 km	MPC · JPL
17945 Hawass	1999 JU_{8}	Hawass	May 14, 1999	Reedy Creek	J. Broughton	·	4.7 km	MPC · JPL
17946	1999 JC_{9}	—	May 7, 1999	Catalina	CSS	V	2.5 km	MPC · JPL
17947	1999 JV_{10}	—	May 9, 1999	Catalina	CSS	·	4.0 km	MPC · JPL
17948	1999 JQ_{15}	—	May 12, 1999	Nanyo	T. Okuni	·	3.1 km	MPC · JPL
17949	1999 JA_{18}	—	May 10, 1999	Socorro	LINEAR	EUN	5.2 km	MPC · JPL
17950 Grover	1999 JS_{18}	Grover	May 10, 1999	Socorro	LINEAR	·	4.0 km	MPC · JPL
17951 Fenska	1999 JO_{19}	Fenska	May 10, 1999	Socorro	LINEAR	·	3.4 km	MPC · JPL
17952 Folsom	1999 JT_{19}	Folsom	May 10, 1999	Socorro	LINEAR	·	2.7 km	MPC · JPL
17953	1999 JB_{20}	—	May 10, 1999	Socorro	LINEAR	·	7.3 km	MPC · JPL
17954 Hopkins	1999 JP_{20}	Hopkins	May 10, 1999	Socorro	LINEAR	·	2.8 km	MPC · JPL
17955 Sedransk	1999 JZ_{22}	Sedransk	May 10, 1999	Socorro	LINEAR	·	4.3 km	MPC · JPL
17956 Andrewlenoir	1999 JC_{28}	Andrewlenoir	May 10, 1999	Socorro	LINEAR	·	2.2 km	MPC · JPL
17957	1999 JE_{29}	—	May 10, 1999	Socorro	LINEAR	·	3.2 km	MPC · JPL
17958 Schoof	1999 JE_{33}	Schoof	May 10, 1999	Socorro	LINEAR	·	2.2 km	MPC · JPL
17959 Camierickson	1999 JZ_{33}	Camierickson	May 10, 1999	Socorro	LINEAR	NEM	7.6 km	MPC · JPL
17960 Liberatore	1999 JB_{36}	Liberatore	May 10, 1999	Socorro	LINEAR	NYS	3.9 km	MPC · JPL
17961 Mariagorodnitsky	1999 JB_{37}	Mariagorodnitsky	May 10, 1999	Socorro	LINEAR	V	2.9 km	MPC · JPL
17962 Andrewherron	1999 JD_{37}	Andrewherron	May 10, 1999	Socorro	LINEAR	·	3.1 km	MPC · JPL
17963 Vonderheydt	1999 JM_{40}	Vonderheydt	May 10, 1999	Socorro	LINEAR	·	6.3 km	MPC · JPL
17964	1999 JY_{41}	—	May 10, 1999	Socorro	LINEAR	·	3.9 km	MPC · JPL
17965 Brodersen	1999 JO_{43}	Brodersen	May 10, 1999	Socorro	LINEAR	·	4.0 km	MPC · JPL
17966	1999 JS_{43}	—	May 10, 1999	Socorro	LINEAR	·	5.1 km	MPC · JPL
17967 Bacampbell	1999 JT_{45}	Bacampbell	May 10, 1999	Socorro	LINEAR	·	3.0 km	MPC · JPL
17968	1999 JX_{46}	—	May 10, 1999	Socorro	LINEAR	·	10 km	MPC · JPL
17969 Truong	1999 JB_{47}	Truong	May 10, 1999	Socorro	LINEAR	·	2.9 km	MPC · JPL
17970 Palepu	1999 JA_{48}	Palepu	May 10, 1999	Socorro	LINEAR	·	3.0 km	MPC · JPL
17971 Samuelhowell	1999 JZ_{50}	Samuelhowell	May 10, 1999	Socorro	LINEAR	·	3.4 km	MPC · JPL
17972 Ascione	1999 JH_{51}	Ascione	May 10, 1999	Socorro	LINEAR	PAD	5.3 km	MPC · JPL
17973	1999 JP_{51}	—	May 10, 1999	Socorro	LINEAR	·	23 km	MPC · JPL
17974	1999 JL_{52}	—	May 10, 1999	Socorro	LINEAR	·	4.0 km	MPC · JPL
17975	1999 JB_{53}	—	May 10, 1999	Socorro	LINEAR	·	4.0 km	MPC · JPL
17976 Schulman	1999 JQ_{54}	Schulman	May 10, 1999	Socorro	LINEAR	·	4.7 km	MPC · JPL
17977	1999 JR_{54}	—	May 10, 1999	Socorro	LINEAR	·	6.1 km	MPC · JPL
17978	1999 JS_{54}	—	May 10, 1999	Socorro	LINEAR	·	3.1 km	MPC · JPL
17979	1999 JS_{55}	—	May 10, 1999	Socorro	LINEAR	GEF	5.8 km	MPC · JPL
17980 Vanschaik	1999 JN_{56}	Vanschaik	May 10, 1999	Socorro	LINEAR	KOR	5.2 km	MPC · JPL
17981	1999 JZ_{56}	—	May 10, 1999	Socorro	LINEAR	·	10 km	MPC · JPL
17982 Simcmillan	1999 JK_{57}	Simcmillan	May 10, 1999	Socorro	LINEAR	·	2.8 km	MPC · JPL
17983 Buhrmester	1999 JV_{59}	Buhrmester	May 10, 1999	Socorro	LINEAR	NYS	6.3 km	MPC · JPL
17984 Ahantonioli	1999 JU_{60}	Ahantonioli	May 10, 1999	Socorro	LINEAR	·	6.3 km	MPC · JPL
17985	1999 JC_{62}	—	May 10, 1999	Socorro	LINEAR	·	4.4 km	MPC · JPL
17986	1999 JF_{62}	—	May 10, 1999	Socorro	LINEAR	·	5.5 km	MPC · JPL
17987	1999 JQ_{62}	—	May 10, 1999	Socorro	LINEAR	EOS	5.5 km	MPC · JPL
17988 Joannehsieh	1999 JR_{62}	Joannehsieh	May 10, 1999	Socorro	LINEAR	V	2.4 km	MPC · JPL
17989	1999 JE_{64}	—	May 10, 1999	Socorro	LINEAR	DOR	13 km	MPC · JPL
17990	1999 JK_{64}	—	May 10, 1999	Socorro	LINEAR	·	8.4 km	MPC · JPL
17991 Joshuaegan	1999 JN_{65}	Joshuaegan	May 12, 1999	Socorro	LINEAR	·	2.7 km	MPC · JPL
17992 Japellegrino	1999 JR_{65}	Japellegrino	May 12, 1999	Socorro	LINEAR	·	2.0 km	MPC · JPL
17993 Kluesing	1999 JT_{68}	Kluesing	May 12, 1999	Socorro	LINEAR	·	2.5 km	MPC · JPL
17994	1999 JF_{70}	—	May 12, 1999	Socorro	LINEAR	·	11 km	MPC · JPL
17995 Jolinefan	1999 JF_{74}	Jolinefan	May 12, 1999	Socorro	LINEAR	·	2.6 km	MPC · JPL
17996	1999 JQ_{75}	—	May 10, 1999	Socorro	LINEAR	·	4.3 km	MPC · JPL
17997	1999 JN_{78}	—	May 13, 1999	Socorro	LINEAR	·	6.8 km	MPC · JPL
17998	1999 JN_{80}	—	May 12, 1999	Socorro	LINEAR	·	7.4 km	MPC · JPL
17999	1999 JO_{80}	—	May 12, 1999	Socorro	LINEAR	EUN	3.9 km	MPC · JPL
18000	1999 JX_{80}	—	May 12, 1999	Socorro	LINEAR	EUN	4.3 km	MPC · JPL

back to top

== See also ==
- Meanings of minor-planet names: 17001–18000
