= 17119 Alexisrodrz =

Main-belt asteroid

Discovery
- Discovered by: LINEAR
- Discovery site: Lincoln Lab's ETS
- Discovery date: 10 May 1999

Designations
- Named after: Alexis Rodriguez (2003 ISEF awardee)
- Alternative designations: 1999 JP_{59} · 1998 BY_{48}
- Minor planet category: main-belt · (middle) background

Orbital characteristics
- Epoch 4 September 2017 (JD 2458000.5)
- Uncertainty parameter 0
- Observation arc: 23.68 yr (8,649 days)
- Aphelion: 2.7912 AU
- Perihelion: 2.4851 AU
- Semi-major axis: 2.6381 AU
- Eccentricity: 0.0580
- Orbital period (sidereal): 4.29 yr (1,565 days)
- Mean anomaly: 34.066°
- Mean motion: 0° 13^{m} 48^{s} / day
- Inclination: 6.3433°
- Longitude of ascending node: 160.73°
- Argument of perihelion: 150.73°

Physical characteristics
- Dimensions: 3.917±0.732 km 4.56 km (calculated)
- Synodic rotation period: 17.7838±0.0290 h 17.7935 h
- Geometric albedo: 0.10 (assumed); 0.182±0.080; 0.1825±0.0798
- Spectral type: LS · S/C
- Absolute magnitude (H): 14.4 · 14.22±0.28 · 14.5 · 14.317±0.005 (R) · 14.82

17119 Alexisrodrz (provisional designation 1999 JP_{59}) is a stony background asteroid from the central region of the asteroid belt, approximately 4 kilometers in diameter.

It was discovered on 10 May 1999, by the LINEAR team at the Lincoln Laboratory's Experimental Test Site in Socorro, New Mexico, United States. The asteroid was later named for Alexis Rodriguez, a 2003-awardee of the Intel International Science and Engineering Fair.

== Orbit and classification ==
Alexisrodrz orbits the Sun in the central main-belt at a distance of 2.5–2.8 AU once every 4 years and 3 months (1,565 days). Its orbit has an eccentricity of 0.06 and an inclination of 6° with respect to the ecliptic.

The asteroid's observation arc begins 7 years prior to its official discovery observation, with a precovery taken at Steward Observatory (Kitt Peak) in November 1992.

== Physical characteristics ==
Alexisrodrz has been characterized as a LS-subtype by Pan-STARRS' large-scale survey. This subtype is a transitional group from the common stony S-type to the rare and reddish L-type asteroids.

=== Diameter and albedo ===
According to the survey carried out by the NEOWISE mission of NASA's space-based Wide-field Infrared Survey Explorer, Alexisrodrz measures 3.9 kilometers in diameter and its surface has an albedo of 0.18, while the Collaborative Asteroid Lightcurve Link assumes an albedo of 0.10 – a compromise value between the stony (0.20) and carbonaceous (0.057) asteroids found in the 2.6 to 2.7 AU region of the asteroid belt – and calculates a diameter of 4.6 kilometers with an absolute magnitude of 14.82.

=== Rotation period ===
In January 2011, and September 2013, two rotational lightcurves of Alexisrodrz were obtained from photometric observations made by astronomers at the Palomar Transient Factory in California. Lightcurve analysis gave a concurring rotation period of 17.7838 and 17.7935 hours with a brightness variation of 0.48 and 0.60 magnitude, respectively (U=2/2).

== Naming ==
This minor planet was named for the 3rd-place winner of the 2003 Intel International Science and Engineering Fair, Alexis Rodriguez (born 1986). At the time, he attended the Puerto Rican Aurea E. Quiles Claudio High School in Guanica. The approved naming citation was published by the Minor Planet Center on 14 June 2004 (M.P.C. 52172).
