= 17163 Vasifedoseev =

Main-belt asteroid

Discovery
- Discovered by: LINEAR
- Discovery site: Lincoln Lab's ETS
- Discovery date: 9 June 1999

Designations
- Named after: Vasiliy Fedoseev (2003 ISEF awardee)
- Alternative designations: 1999 LT_{19} · 1990 QY_{10} 1994 LC_{4} · 1995 SY_{12} 1998 FE_{39} · 1998 FN_{140}
- Minor planet category: main-belt · Koronis

Orbital characteristics
- Epoch 4 September 2017 (JD 2458000.5)
- Uncertainty parameter 0
- Observation arc: 26.62 yr (9,723 days)
- Aphelion: 3.1357 AU
- Perihelion: 2.6708 AU
- Semi-major axis: 2.9032 AU
- Eccentricity: 0.0801
- Orbital period (sidereal): 4.95 yr (1,807 days)
- Mean anomaly: 163.48°
- Mean motion: 0° 11^{m} 57.12^{s} / day
- Inclination: 1.3220°
- Longitude of ascending node: 343.23°
- Argument of perihelion: 2.8711°

Physical characteristics
- Dimensions: 3.67 km (calculated); 4.863±0.268 km
- Synodic rotation period: 4.1124±0.0006 h
- Geometric albedo: 0.171±0.045; 0.24 (assumed)
- Spectral type: S
- Absolute magnitude (H): 14.0 · 14.1 · 14.26±0.29 · 14.34 · 13.891±0.003 (R)

17163 Vasifedoseev (provisional designation 1999 LT_{19}) is a stony Koronian asteroid from the outer region of the asteroid belt, approximately 4 kilometers in diameter.

The asteroid was discovered on 9 June 1999, by the Lincoln Near-Earth Asteroid Research team at Lincoln Laboratory's ETS in Socorro, New Mexico, United States. It was named for Vasiliy Fedoseev, an awardee of the ISEF contest in 2003.

== Orbit and classification ==
Vasifedoseev is a member of the Koronis family, a family of stony asteroids in the outer main-belt. It orbits the Sun at a distance of 2.7–3.1 AU once every 4 years and 11 months (1,807 days). Its orbit has an eccentricity of 0.08 and an inclination of 1° with respect to the ecliptic. The first precovery was obtained at ESO's La Silla Observatory in 1990, extending the asteroid's observation arc by 9 years prior to its discovery.

== Physical characteristics ==
=== Rotation period ===
A rotational lightcurve of Vasifedoseev was obtained from photometric observations by the wide-field survey at the Palomar Transient Factory in September 2010. Lightcurve analysis gave a rotation period of 4.1124 hours with a brightness variation of 0.23 magnitude (U=2).

=== Diameter and albedo ===
According to the survey carried out by the NEOWISE mission of NASA's space-based Wide-field Infrared Survey Explorer, Vasifedoseev measures 4.9 kilometers in diameter and its surface has an albedo of 0.17, while the Collaborative Asteroid Lightcurve Link assumes an albedo of 0.24 and calculates a diameter of 3.7 kilometers with an absolute magnitude of 14.34.

== Naming ==
This minor planet was named after Russian Vasiliy G. Fedoseev (born 1986) an awardee of the Intel International Science and Engineering Fair (ISEF) in 2003. At the time, he attended the Lyceum of Information Technologies Moscow, Russia. The official naming citation was published by the Minor Planet Center on 14 June 2004 (M.P.C. 52172).
