= 17035 Velichko =

Main-belt asteroid

Discovery
- Discovered by: LONEOS
- Discovery site: Anderson Mesa Stn.
- Discovery date: 22 March 1999

Designations
- Named after: Fedor Velichko (Ukrainian astronomer)
- Alternative designations: 1999 FC_{10} · 1989 TD_{2} 1991 EX_{1}
- Minor planet category: main-belt · Vestian

Orbital characteristics
- Epoch 4 September 2017 (JD 2458000.5)
- Uncertainty parameter 0
- Observation arc: 27.44 yr (10,023 days)
- Aphelion: 2.8032 AU
- Perihelion: 2.0823 AU
- Semi-major axis: 2.4428 AU
- Eccentricity: 0.1476
- Orbital period (sidereal): 3.82 yr (1,395 days)
- Mean anomaly: 123.83°
- Mean motion: 0° 15^{m} 29.52^{s} / day
- Inclination: 6.2451°
- Longitude of ascending node: 179.78°
- Argument of perihelion: 174.73°

Physical characteristics
- Dimensions: 4.19 km (calculated); 4.758±0.314 km
- Synodic rotation period: 2.8990±0.0006; 2.899±0.001 h
- Geometric albedo: 0.283±0.080; 0.2832±0.0801; 0.4 (assumed)
- Spectral type: V
- Absolute magnitude (H): 13.5 · 13.6 · 13.394±0.004 (R) · 13.92±0.30

17035 Velichko (provisional designation 1999 FC_{10}) is a Vestian asteroid from the inner regions of the asteroid belt, approximately 4.5 kilometers in diameter.

It was discovered on 22 March 1999, by LONEOS program at Lowell's Anderson Mesa Station near Flagstaff, Arizona, United States. The asteroid was named after Ukrainian astronomer Fedor Velichko.

== Orbit and classification ==
Velichko is a core member of the Vesta family, thought to have originated from the Rheasilvia crater, a large impact crater on the south-polar surface of 4 Vesta, which is the main-belt's second-most-massive asteroid after 1 Ceres.

It orbits the Sun in the inner main-belt at a distance of 2.1–2.8 AU once every 3 years and 10 months (1,395 days). Its orbit has an eccentricity of 0.15 and an inclination of 6° with respect to the ecliptic.

The asteroid's observation arc begins 10 years prior to its official discovery observation, with its identification as 1989 TD_{2} at ESO's La Silla Observatory in October 1989.

== Physical characteristics ==
Velichko has been characterized as a bright V-type asteroid by Pan-STARRS photometric survey.

=== Rotation period ===
Two photometric lightcurves of Velichko were obtained by French astronomer René Roy at the Blauvac Observatory (627) in France, and by astronomers at the Palomar Transient Factory in California. Lightcurve analysis gave a rotation period of 2.899 and 2.8990 hours with a brightness variation of 0.23 and 0.29 magnitude, respectively (U=2/2).

=== Diameter and albedo ===
According to the survey carried out by the NEOWISE mission of NASA's space-based Wide-field Infrared Survey Explorer, Velichko has a diameter of 4.8 kilometers and an albedo of 0.28. The Collaborative Asteroid Lightcurve Link assumes a much higher albedo of 0.40, which is typical value for the bright stony surface of Vestian asteroids, and calculates a shorter diameter of 4.2 kilometers.

== Naming ==
This minor planet was named after Ukrainian astronomer Fedor P. Velichko (1957–2013), who was a senior scientist at the Institute of Astronomy of the Ukrainian National University of Kharkiv, and director of the University's Chuguev Observing Station (131), also known as the Chuguevskaya Station. He was an expert on the photometry and polarimetry of small Solar System bodies. The official naming citation was published by the Minor Planet Center on 21 July 2005 (M.P.C. 54563).
