= List of named minor planets: 10000–19999 =

This is a partial list of named minor planets in numerical order. It contains a total of 4,905 entries as of 9 November 2026. Minor planets for which no article exist are displayed in grey color and redirect to the list of minor planets (see List of minor planets § Main index).

== From 10,000 to 19,999 ==
- 10000 Myriostos
- 10001 Palermo
- 10002 Bagdasarian
- 10003 Caryhuang
- 10004 Igormakarov
- 10005 Chernega
- 10006 Sessai
- 10007 Malytheatre
- 10008 Raisanyo
- 10009 Hirosetanso
- 10010 Rudruna
- 10011 Avidzba
- 10012 Tmutarakania
- 10013 Stenholm
- 10014 Shaim
- 10015 Valenlebedev
- 10016 Yugan
- 10017 Jaotsungi
- 10018 Lykawka
- 10019 Wesleyfraser
- 10020 Bagenal
- 10021 Henja
- 10022 Zubov
- 10023 Vladifedorov
- 10024 Marthahazen
- 10025 Rauer
- 10026 Sophiexeon
- 10027 Perozzi
- 10028 Bonus
- 10029 Hiramperkins
- 10030 Philkeenan
- 10031 Vladarnolda
- 10032 Hans-Ulrich
- 10033 Bodewits
- 10034 Birlan
- 10035 Davidgheesling
- 10036 McGaha
- 10037 Raypickard
- 10038 Tanaro
- 10039 Keet Seel
- 10040 Ghillar
- 10041 Parkinson
- 10042 Budstewart
- 10043 Janegann
- 10044 Squyres
- 10045 Dorarussell
- 10046 Creighton
- 10047 Davidchapman
- 10048 Grönbech
- 10049 Vorovich
- 10050 Rayman
- 10051 Albee
- 10052 Nason
- 10053 Noeldetilly
- 10054 Solomin
- 10055 Silcher
- 10056 Johnschroer
- 10057 L'Obel
- 10058 Ikwilliamson
- 10059 McCullough
- 10060 Amymilne
- 10061 Ndolaprata
- 10062 Kimhay
- 10063 Erinleeryan
- 10064 Hirosetamotsu
- 10065 Greglisk
- 10066 Pihack
- 10067 Bertuch
- 10068 Dodoens
- 10069 Fontenelle
- 10070 Liuzongli
- 10071 Paraguay
- 10072 Uruguay
- 10073 Peterhiscocks
- 10074 Van den Berghe
- 10075 Campeche
- 10076 Rogerhill
- 10077 Raykoenig
- 10078 Stanthorpe
- 10079 Meunier
- 10080 Macevans
- 10081 Dantaylor
- 10082 Bronson
- 10083 Gordonanderson
- 10084 Rossparker
- 10085 Jekennedy
- 10086 McCurdy
- 10087 Dechesne
- 10088 Digne
- 10089 Turgot
- 10090 Sikorsky
- 10091 Bandaisan
- 10092 Sasaki
- 10093 Diesel
- 10094 Eijikato
- 10095 Carlloewe
- 10096 Colleenohare
- 10097 Humbroncos
- 10098 Jaymiematthews
- 10099 Glazebrook
- 10100 Bürgel
- 10101 Fourier
- 10102 Digerhuvud
- 10103 Jungfrun
- 10104 Hoburgsgubben
- 10105 Holmhällar
- 10106 Lergrav
- 10107 Kenny
- 10108 Tomlinson
- 10109 Sidhu
- 10110 Jameshead
- 10111 Fresnel
- 10112 Skookumjim
- 10113 Alantitle
- 10114 Greifswald
- 10116 Robertfranz
- 10117 Tanikawa
- 10118 Jiwu
- 10119 Remarque
- 10120 Ypres
- 10121 Arzamas
- 10122 Fröding
- 10123 Fideöja
- 10124 Hemse
- 10125 Stenkyrka
- 10126 Lärbro
- 10127 Fröjel
- 10128 Bro
- 10129 Fole
- 10130 Ardre
- 10131 Stånga
- 10132 Lummelunda
- 10133 Gerdahorneck
- 10134 Joycepenner
- 10135 Wimhermsen
- 10136 Gauguin
- 10137 Thucydides
- 10138 Ohtanihiroshi
- 10139 Ronsard
- 10140 Villon
- 10141 Gotenba
- 10142 Sakka
- 10143 Kamogawa
- 10144 Bernardbigot
- 10146 Mukaitadashi
- 10147 Mizugatsuka
- 10148 Shirase
- 10149 Cavagna
- 10151 Rubens
- 10152 Ukichiro
- 10153 Goldman
- 10154 Tanuki
- 10155 Numaguti
- 10156 Darnley
- 10157 Asagiri
- 10158 Taroubou
- 10159 Tokara
- 10160 Totoro
- 10161 Nakanoshima
- 10162 Issunboushi
- 10163 Onomichi
- 10164 Akusekijima
- 10166 Takarajima
- 10167 Yoshiwatiso
- 10168 Stony Ridge
- 10169 Ogasawara
- 10170 Petrjakeš
- 10171 Takaotengu
- 10172 Humphreys
- 10173 Hanzelkazikmund
- 10174 Emička
- 10175 Aenona
- 10176 Gaiavettori
- 10177 Ellison
- 10178 Iriki
- 10179 Ishigaki
- 10181 Davidacomba
- 10182 Junkobiwaki
- 10183 Ampère
- 10184 Galvani
- 10185 Gaudi
- 10186 Albéniz
- 10188 Yasuoyoneda
- 10189 Normanrockwell
- 10190 Suzannedodd
- 10191 Scottbolton
- 10192 Wanglizhe
- 10193 Nishimoto
- 10194 Tonygeorge
- 10195 Nebraska
- 10196 Akiraarai
- 10197 Senigalliesi
- 10198 Pinelli
- 10199 Chariklo
- 10200 Quadri
- 10201 Korado
- 10202 Mioaramandea
- 10203 Flinders
- 10204 Turing
- 10205 Pokorný
- 10207 Comeniana
- 10208 Germanicus
- 10209 Izanaki
- 10210 Nathues
- 10211 La Spezia
- 10213 Koukolík
- 10215 Lavilledemirmont
- 10216 Popastro
- 10217 Richardcook
- 10218 Bierstadt
- 10219 Penco
- 10220 Pigott
- 10221 Kubrick
- 10222 Klotz
- 10223 Zashikiwarashi
- 10224 Hisashi
- 10226 Seishika
- 10227 Izanami
- 10230 Andrewnorton
- 10231 Penrose
- 10233 Le Creusot
- 10234 Sixtygarden
- 10236 Aayushkaran
- 10237 Adzic
- 10238 Ananyakarthik
- 10239 Hermann
- 10241 Miličević
- 10242 Wasserkuppe
- 10243 Hohe Meissner
- 10244 Thüringer Wald
- 10245 Inselsberg
- 10246 Frankenwald
- 10247 Amphiaraos
- 10248 Fichtelgebirge
- 10249 Harz
- 10250 Hellahaasse
- 10251 Mulisch
- 10252 Heidigraf
- 10253 Westerwald
- 10254 Hunsrück
- 10255 Taunus
- 10256 Vredevoogd
- 10257 Garecynthia
- 10258 Sárneczky
- 10259 Osipovyurij
- 10260 Stellaseitz
- 10261 Nikdollezhalʹ
- 10262 Samoilov
- 10263 Vadimsimona
- 10264 Marov
- 10265 Gunnarsson
- 10266 Vladishukhov
- 10267 Giuppone
- 10269 Tusi
- 10270 Skoglöv
- 10271 Dymond
- 10272 Yuko
- 10273 Katvolk
- 10274 Larryevans
- 10275 Nathankaib
- 10276 Matney
- 10277 Micheli
- 10278 Virkki
- 10279 Rhiannonblaauw
- 10280 Yequanzhi
- 10281 Libourel
- 10282 Emilykramer
- 10283 Cromer
- 10284 Damienlemay
- 10285 Renémichelsen
- 10286 Shnollia
- 10287 Smale
- 10288 Saville
- 10289 Geoffperry
- 10290 Kettering
- 10293 Pribina
- 10295 Hippolyta
- 10296 Rominadisisto
- 10297 Lynnejones
- 10298 Jiangchuanhuang
- 10300 Tanakadate
- 10301 Kataoka
- 10303 Fréret
- 10304 Iwaki
- 10305 Grignard
- 10306 Pagnol
- 10307 Carlschmidt
- 10310 Delacroix
- 10311 Fantin-Latour
- 10313 Vanessa-Mae
- 10315 Brewster
- 10316 Williamturner
- 10318 Sumaura
- 10319 Toshiharu
- 10320 Reiland
- 10321 Rampo
- 10322 Mayuminarita
- 10323 Frazer
- 10324 Vladimirov
- 10325 Bexa
- 10326 Kuragano
- 10327 Batens
- 10330 Durkheim
- 10331 Peterbluhm
- 10332 Défi
- 10333 Portnoff
- 10334 Gibbon
- 10340 Jostjahn
- 10343 Church
- 10344 Llanodelhato
- 10346 Triathlon
- 10347 Murom
- 10348 Poelchau
- 10350 Spallanzani
- 10351 Seiichisato
- 10352 Kawamura
- 10353 Momotaro
- 10354 Guillaumebudé
- 10355 Kojiroharada
- 10356 Rudolfsteiner
- 10358 Kirchhoff
- 10361 Bunsen
- 10364 Tainai
- 10365 Kurokawa
- 10366 Shozosato
- 10367 Sayo
- 10368 Kozuki
- 10369 Sinden
- 10370 Hylonome
- 10371 Gigli
- 10372 Moran
- 10373 MacRobert
- 10374 Etampes
- 10375 Michiokuga
- 10376 Chiarini
- 10377 Kilimanjaro
- 10378 Ingmarbergman
- 10379 Lake Placid
- 10380 Berwald
- 10381 Malinsmith
- 10382 Hadamard
- 10385 Amaterasu
- 10386 Romulus
- 10387 Bepicolombo
- 10388 Zhuguangya
- 10389 Robmanning
- 10390 Lenka
- 10392 Brace
- 10395 Jirkahorn
- 10396 Yugao
- 10397 Zhangmingchang
- 10399 Nishiharima
- 10400 Hakkaisan
- 10401 Masakoba
- 10403 Marcelgrün
- 10404 McCall
- 10405 Yoshiaki
- 10410 Yangguanghua
- 10411 Boshuren
- 10412 Tsukuyomi
- 10413 Pansecchi
- 10415 Mali Lošinj
- 10416 Kottler
- 10421 Dalmatin
- 10422 Yizhaohua
- 10423 Dajčić
- 10424 Gaillard
- 10425 Landfermann
- 10426 Charlierouse
- 10427 Klinkenberg
- 10428 Wanders
- 10429 van Woerden
- 10430 Martschmidt
- 10431 Pottasch
- 10432 Ullischwarz
- 10433 Ponsen
- 10434 Tinbergen
- 10435 Tjeerd
- 10436 Janwillempel
- 10437 van der Kruit
- 10438 Ludolph
- 10439 van Schooten
- 10440 van Swinden
- 10441 van Rijckevorsel
- 10442 Biezenzo
- 10443 van der Pol
- 10444 de Hevesy
- 10445 Coster
- 10446 Siegbahn
- 10447 Bloembergen
- 10448 Schawlow
- 10449 Takuma
- 10450 Girard
- 10452 Zuev
- 10453 Banzan
- 10454 Vallenar
- 10455 Donnison
- 10456 Anechka
- 10457 Suminov
- 10458 Sfranke
- 10459 Vladichaika
- 10460 Correa-Otto
- 10461 Dawilliams
- 10462 Saxogrammaticus
- 10463 Bannister
- 10464 Jessie
- 10465 Olkin
- 10466 Marius-Ioan
- 10467 Peterbus
- 10468 Itacuruba
- 10469 Krohn
- 10470 Bartczak
- 10471 Marciniak
- 10472 Santana-Ros
- 10473 Thirouin
- 10474 Pecina
- 10475 Maxpoilâne
- 10476 Los Molinos
- 10477 Lacumparsita
- 10478 Alsabti
- 10479 Yiqunchen
- 10480 Jennyblue
- 10481 Esipov
- 10482 Dangrieser
- 10483 Tomburns
- 10484 Hecht
- 10485 Sarahyeomans
- 10486 Teron
- 10487 Danpeterson
- 10489 Keinonen
- 10491 Chou
- 10492 Mizzi
- 10493 Pulliah
- 10494 Jenniferwest
- 10498 Bobgent
- 10499 Sarty
- 10500 Nishi-koen
- 10501 Ardmacha
- 10502 Armaghobs
- 10503 Johnmarks
- 10504 Doga
- 10505 Johnnycash
- 10506 Rydberg
- 10508 Haughey
- 10509 Heinrichkayser
- 10510 Maxschreier
- 10512 Yamandu
- 10513 Mackie
- 10514 Harlow
- 10515 Old Joe
- 10516 Sakurajima
- 10521 Jeremyhansen
- 10523 D'Haveloose
- 10524 Maniewski
- 10526 Ginkogino
- 10529 Giessenburg
- 10538 Torode
- 10540 Hachigoroh
- 10541 Malesherbes
- 10542 Ruckers
- 10543 Klee
- 10544 Hörsnebara
- 10545 Källunge
- 10546 Nakanomakoto
- 10547 Yosakoi
- 10549 Helsingborg
- 10550 Malmö
- 10551 Göteborg
- 10552 Stockholm
- 10553 Stenkumla
- 10554 Västerhejde
- 10555 Tagaharue
- 10557 Rowland
- 10558 Karlstad
- 10559 Yukihisa
- 10560 Michinari
- 10561 Shimizumasahiro
- 10563 Izhdubar
- 10566 Zabadak
- 10567 Francobressan
- 10568 Yoshitanaka
- 10569 Kinoshitamasao
- 10570 Shibayasuo
- 10572 Kominejo
- 10573 Piani
- 10577 Jihčesmuzeum
- 10579 Diluca
- 10581 Jeníkhollan
- 10582 Harumi
- 10583 Kanetugu
- 10584 Ferrini
- 10585 Wabi-Sabi
- 10586 Jansteen
- 10587 Strindberg
- 10588 Adamcrandall
- 10589 Giusimicela
- 10590 Ragazzoni
- 10591 Caverni
- 10592 Chakrabarty
- 10593 Susannesandra
- 10596 Stevensimpson
- 10598 Markrees
- 10601 Hiwatashi
- 10602 Masakazu
- 10604 Susanoo
- 10605 Guidoni
- 10606 Crocco
- 10607 Amandahatton
- 10608 Mameta
- 10609 Hirai
- 10611 Yanjici
- 10612 Houffalize
- 10613 Kushinadahime
- 10616 Inouetakeshi
- 10617 Takumi
- 10619 Ninigi
- 10626 Zajíc
- 10627 Ookuninushi
- 10628 Feuerbacher
- 10629 Krishnamani
- 10631 Koppes
- 10633 Akimasa
- 10634 Pepibican
- 10635 Chiragkumar
- 10637 Heimlich
- 10638 McGlothlin
- 10639 Gleason
- 10640 Varunkumar
- 10642 Charmaine
- 10645 Brač
- 10646 Machielalberts
- 10647 Meesters
- 10648 Plancius
- 10649 VOC
- 10650 Houtman
- 10651 van Linschoten
- 10652 Blaeu
- 10653 Witsen
- 10654 Bontekoe
- 10655 Pietkeyser
- 10656 Albrecht
- 10657 Wanach
- 10658 Gretadevries
- 10659 Sauerland
- 10660 Felixhormuth
- 10661 Teutoburgerwald
- 10662 Peterwisse
- 10663 Schwarzwald
- 10664 Phemios
- 10665 Ortigão
- 10666 Feldberg
- 10667 van Marxveldt
- 10668 Plansos
- 10669 Herfordia
- 10670 Seminozhenko
- 10671 Mazurova
- 10672 Kostyukova
- 10673 Berezhnoy
- 10674 de Elía
- 10675 Kharlamov
- 10676 Jamesmcdanell
- 10677 Colucci
- 10678 Alilagoa
- 10679 Chankaochang
- 10680 Ermakov
- 10681 Khture
- 10682 Kutryk
- 10683 Carter
- 10684 Babkina
- 10685 Kharkivuniver
- 10686 Kaluna
- 10688 Haghighipour
- 10689 Pinillaalonso
- 10690 Massera
- 10691 Sans
- 10692 Opeil
- 10693 Zangari
- 10694 Lacerda
- 10695 Yasunorifujiwara
- 10696 Giuliattiwinter
- 10697 Othonwinter
- 10698 Singer
- 10699 Calabrese
- 10700 Juanangelviera
- 10701 Marilynsimons
- 10702 Arizorcas
- 10703 Saint-Jacques
- 10704 Sidey
- 10707 Prunariu
- 10708 Richardspalding
- 10709 Ottofranz
- 10711 Pskov
- 10712 Malashchuk
- 10713 Limorenko
- 10715 Nagler
- 10716 Olivermorton
- 10717 Dickwalker
- 10718 Samusʹ
- 10719 Andamar
- 10720 Danzl
- 10721 Tuterov
- 10722 Monari
- 10723 Tobiashinse
- 10724 Carolraymond
- 10725 Sukunabikona
- 10726 Elodie
- 10727 Akitsushima
- 10728 Vladimirfock
- 10729 Tsvetkova
- 10730 White
- 10731 Dollyparton
- 10733 Georgesand
- 10734 Wieck
- 10735 Seine
- 10736 Marybrück
- 10737 Brück
- 10738 Marcoaldo
- 10739 Lowman
- 10740 Fallersleben
- 10741 Valeriocarruba
- 10744 Tsuruta
- 10745 Arnstadt
- 10746 Mühlhausen
- 10747 Köthen
- 10749 Musäus
- 10753 van de Velde
- 10758 Aldoushuxley
- 10760 Ozeki
- 10761 Lyubimets
- 10762 von Laue
- 10763 Hlawka
- 10764 Rübezahl
- 10767 Toyomasu
- 10768 Sarutahiko
- 10769 Minas Gerais
- 10770 Belo Horizonte
- 10771 Ouro Prêto
- 10773 Jamespaton
- 10774 Eisenach
- 10775 Leipzig
- 10776 Musashitomiyo
- 10778 Marcks
- 10780 Apollinaire
- 10781 Ritter
- 10782 Hittmair
- 10784 Noailles
- 10785 Dejaiffe
- 10786 Robertmayer
- 10787 Ottoburkard
- 10789 Mikeread
- 10791 Uson
- 10792 Ecuador
- 10793 Quito
- 10794 Vänge
- 10795 Babben
- 10796 Sollerman
- 10797 Guatemala
- 10799 Yucatán
- 10801 Lüneburg
- 10802 Masamifuruya
- 10803 Caléyo
- 10804 Amenouzume
- 10805 Iwano
- 10806 Mexico
- 10807 Uggarde
- 10808 Digerrojr
- 10809 Majsterrojr
- 10810 Lejsturojr
- 10811 Lau
- 10812 Grötlingbo
- 10813 Mästerby
- 10814 Gnisvärd
- 10815 Östergarn
- 10819 Mahakala
- 10820 Offenbach
- 10821 Kimuratakeshi
- 10822 Yasunori
- 10823 Sakaguchi
- 10825 Augusthermann
- 10827 Doikazunori
- 10828 Tomjones
- 10829 Matsuobasho
- 10830 Desforges
- 10831 Takamagahara
- 10832 Hazamashigetomi
- 10834 Zembsch-Schreve
- 10835 Fröbel
- 10837 Yuyakekoyake
- 10838 Lebon
- 10839 Hufeland
- 10841 Ericforbes
- 10847 Koch
- 10849 Onigiri
- 10850 Denso
- 10853 Aimoto
- 10856 Bechstein
- 10857 Blüthner
- 10861 Ciske
- 10863 Oye
- 10864 Yamagatashi
- 10865 Thelmaruby
- 10866 Peru
- 10867 Lima
- 10870 Gwendolen
- 10872 Vaculík
- 10874 Locatelli
- 10875 Veracini
- 10877 Jiangnan Tianchi
- 10878 Moriyama
- 10880 Kaguya
- 10882 Shinonaga
- 10884 Tsuboimasaki
- 10885 Horimasato
- 10886 Mitsuroohba
- 10888 Yamatano-orochi
- 10891 Fink
- 10892 Gianna
- 10894 Nakai
- 10895 Aynrand
- 10900 Folkner
- 10902 Hebeishida
- 10907 Savalle
- 10908 Kallestroetzel
- 10911 Ziqiangbuxi
- 10914 Tucker
- 10916 Okina-Ouna
- 10918 Kodaly
- 10919 Pepíkzicha
- 10921 Romanozen
- 10922 Thomaslam
- 10923 Gabrielleliu
- 10924 Mariagriffin
- 10925 Ventoux
- 10926 Hayeri
- 10927 Vaucluse
- 10928 Caprara
- 10929 Chenfangyun
- 10930 Jinyong
- 10931 Ceccano
- 10932 Rebentrost
- 10934 Pauldelvaux
- 10937 Ferris
- 10938 Lorenzalevy
- 10939 Maheshwari
- 10941 Mamidala
- 10942 Natashamaniar
- 10943 Brunier
- 10946 Guyidong
- 10947 Kaiserstuhl
- 10948 Odenwald
- 10949 Königstuhl
- 10950 Albertjansen
- 10951 Spessart
- 10952 Vogelsberg
- 10953 Gerdatschira
- 10954 Spiegel
- 10955 Harig
- 10956 Vosges
- 10957 Alps
- 10958 Mont Blanc
- 10959 Appennino
- 10960 Gran Sasso
- 10961 Buysballot
- 10962 Sonnenborgh
- 10963 van der Brugge
- 10964 Degraaff
- 10965 van Leverink
- 10966 van der Hucht
- 10967 Billallen
- 10968 Sterken
- 10969 Perryman
- 10970 de Zeeuw
- 10971 van Dishoeck
- 10972 Merbold
- 10973 Thomasreiter
- 10974 Carolalbert
- 10975 Schelderode
- 10976 Wubbena
- 10977 Mathlener
- 10978 Bärbchen
- 10979 Fristephenson
- 10980 Breimer
- 10981 Fransaris
- 10982 Poerink
- 10983 Smolders
- 10984 Gispen
- 10985 Feast
- 10986 Govert
- 10988 Feinstein
- 10989 Dolios
- 10990 Okunev
- 10991 Dulov
- 10992 Veryuslaviya
- 10994 Fouchard
- 10996 Armandspitz
- 10997 Gahm
- 10999 Braga-Ribas
- 11001 Andrewulff
- 11002 Richardlis
- 11003 Andronov
- 11004 Stenmark
- 11005 Waldtrudering
- 11006 Gilson
- 11007 Granahan
- 11008 Ernst
- 11009 Sigridclose
- 11010 Artemieva
- 11011 KIAM
- 11012 Henning
- 11013 Kullander
- 11014 Svätopluk
- 11015 Romanenko
- 11016 Borisov
- 11017 Billputnam
- 11019 Hansrott
- 11020 Orwell
- 11021 Foderà
- 11022 Serio
- 11026 Greatbotkin
- 11027 Astafʹev
- 11033 Mazanek
- 11037 Distler
- 11039 Raynal
- 11040 Wundt
- 11041 Fechner
- 11042 Ernstweber
- 11043 Pepping
- 11050 Messiaën
- 11051 Racine
- 11055 Honduras
- 11056 Volland
- 11059 Nulliusinverba
- 11061 Lagerlöf
- 11063 Poynting
- 11064 Dogen
- 11066 Sigurd
- 11067 Greenancy
- 11069 Bellqvist
- 11072 Hiraoka
- 11073 Cavell
- 11074 Kuniwake
- 11075 Dönhoff
- 11079 Mitsunori
- 11081 Persäve
- 11082 Spilliaert
- 11083 Caracas
- 11084 Giò
- 11085 Isala
- 11086 Nagatayuji
- 11087 Yamasakimakoto
- 11090 Popelin
- 11091 Thelonious
- 11092 Iwakisan
- 11094 Cuba
- 11095 Havana
- 11098 Ginsberg
- 11099 Sonodamasaki
- 11100 Lai
- 11101 Českáfilharmonie
- 11102 Bertorighini
- 11103 Miekerouppe
- 11104 Airion
- 11105 Puchnarová
- 11107 Hakkoda
- 11108 Hachimantai
- 11109 Iwatesan
- 11111 Repunit
- 11112 Cagnoli
- 11115 Kariya
- 11117 Giuseppeolongo
- 11118 Modra
- 11119 Taro
- 11120 Pancaldi
- 11121 Malpighi
- 11122 Eliscolombini
- 11123 Aliciaclaire
- 11124 Mikulášek
- 11126 Doleček
- 11127 Hagi
- 11128 Ostravia
- 11129 Hayachine
- 11132 Horne
- 11133 Kumotori
- 11134 České Budějovice
- 11135 Ryokami
- 11136 Shirleymarinus
- 11137 Yarigatake
- 11138 Hotakadake
- 11139 Qingdaoligong
- 11140 Yakedake
- 11141 Jindrawalter
- 11142 Facchini
- 11144 Radiocommunicata
- 11145 Emanuelli
- 11146 Kirigamine
- 11147 Delmas
- 11148 Einhardress
- 11149 Tateshina
- 11150 Bragg
- 11151 Oodaigahara
- 11152 Oomine
- 11154 Kobushi
- 11155 Kinpu
- 11156 Al-Khwarismi
- 11158 Cirou
- 11159 Mizugaki
- 11160 Wechsler
- 11161 Daibosatsu
- 11163 Milešovka
- 11165 Mariocabrera
- 11166 Anatolefrance
- 11167 Kunžak
- 11169 Alkon
- 11170 Bradenmilford
- 11173 Jayanderson
- 11174 Carandrews
- 11176 Batth
- 11178 Emmajoy
- 11179 Ahmadperez
- 11180 Brentperlman
- 11184 Postma
- 11187 Richoliver
- 11189 Rabeaton
- 11190 Jennibell
- 11191 Paskvić
- 11193 Mérida
- 11194 Mirna
- 11195 Woomera
- 11196 Michanikos
- 11197 Beranek
- 11201 Talich
- 11202 Teddunham
- 11203 Danielbetten
- 11206 Bibee
- 11207 Black
- 11210 Kevinqian
- 11211 Saxena
- 11212 Tebbutt
- 11214 Ruhisayana
- 11216 Billhubbard
- 11219 Benbohn
- 11225 Borden
- 11227 Ksenborisova
- 11228 Botnick
- 11229 Brookebowers
- 11230 Deschaffer
- 11231 Schiavo
- 11238 Johanmaurits
- 11239 Marcgraf
- 11240 Piso
- 11241 Eckhout
- 11242 Franspost
- 11243 de Graauw
- 11244 Andrékuipers
- 11245 Hansderijk
- 11246 Orvillewright
- 11247 Wilburwright
- 11248 Blériot
- 11249 Etna
- 11251 Icarion
- 11252 Laërtes
- 11253 Mesyats
- 11254 Konkohekisui
- 11255 Fujiiekio
- 11256 Fuglesang
- 11257 Rodionta
- 11258 Aoyama
- 11259 Yingtungchen
- 11260 Camargo
- 11261 Krisbecker
- 11262 Drube
- 11263 Pesonen
- 11264 Claudiomaccone
- 11265 Hasselmann
- 11266 Macke
- 11267 Donaldkessler
- 11268 Spassky
- 11269 Knyr
- 11274 Castillo-Rogez
- 11277 Ballard
- 11278 Telesio
- 11280 Sakurai
- 11281 Nobuooshita
- 11282 Hanakusa
- 11284 Belenus
- 11288 Okunohosomichi
- 11289 Frescobaldi
- 11292 Bunjisuzuki
- 11294 Kazu
- 11295 Gustaflarsson
- 11296 Denzen
- 11298 Gide
- 11299 Annafreud
- 11302 Rubicon
- 11304 Cowra
- 11305 Ahlqvist
- 11306 Åkesson
- 11307 Erikolsson
- 11308 Tofta
- 11309 Malus
- 11311 Peleus
- 11313 Kügelgen
- 11314 Charcot
- 11315 Salpêtrière
- 11316 Fuchitatsuo
- 11317 Hitoshi
- 11321 Tosimatumoto
- 11322 Aquamarine
- 11323 Nasu
- 11324 Hayamizu
- 11325 Slavický
- 11326 Ladislavschmied
- 11328 Mariotozzi
- 11331 Peggynugent
- 11332 Jameswatt
- 11333 Forman
- 11334 Rio de Janeiro
- 11335 Santiago
- 11336 Piranesi
- 11337 Sandro
- 11338 Schiele
- 11339 Orlík
- 11341 Babbage
- 11348 Allegra
- 11349 Witten
- 11350 Teresa
- 11351 Leucus
- 11352 Koldewey
- 11353 Guillaume
- 11356 Chuckjones
- 11359 Piteglio
- 11360 Formigine
- 11361 Orbinskij
- 11363 Vives
- 11364 Karlštejn
- 11365 NASA
- 11367 Rachelseevers
- 11369 Brazelton
- 11370 Nabrown
- 11371 Camley
- 11372 Aditisingh
- 11373 Carbonaro
- 11374 Briantaylor
- 11376 Taizomuta
- 11377 Nye
- 11378 Dauria
- 11379 Flaubert
- 11380 Amolsingh
- 11382 Juliasitu
- 11384 Sartre
- 11385 Beauvoir
- 11392 Paulpeeters
- 11395 Iphinous
- 11397 Eriopis
- 11400 Raša
- 11401 Pierralba
- 11404 Wittig
- 11406 Ucciocontin
- 11407 Madsubramanian
- 11408 Zahradník
- 11409 Horkheimer
- 11413 Catanach
- 11414 Allanchu
- 11417 Chughtai
- 11418 Williamwang
- 11419 Donjohnson
- 11420 Zoeweiss
- 11421 Cardano
- 11422 Alilienthal
- 11423 Cronin
- 11425 Wearydunlop
- 11426 Molster
- 11427 Willemkolff
- 11428 Alcinoös
- 11429 Demodokus
- 11430 Lodewijkberg
- 11431 Karelbosscha
- 11432 Kerkhoven
- 11433 Gemmafrisius
- 11434 Lohnert
- 11437 Cardalda
- 11438 Zeldovich
- 11440 Massironi
- 11441 Anadiego
- 11442 Seijin-Sanso
- 11443 Youdale
- 11444 Peshekhonov
- 11445 Fedotov
- 11446 Betankur
- 11448 Miahajduková
- 11449 Stephwerner
- 11450 Shearer
- 11451 Aarongolden
- 11453 Cañada-Assandri
- 11454 Mariomelita
- 11455 Richardstarr
- 11456 Cotto-Figueroa
- 11457 Hitomikobayashi
- 11458 Rosemarypike
- 11459 Andráspál
- 11460 Juliafang
- 11461 Wladimirneumann
- 11462 Hsingwenlin
- 11463 Petrpokorny
- 11464 Moser
- 11465 Fulvio
- 11466 Katharinaotto
- 11467 Simonporter
- 11468 Shantanunaidu
- 11469 Rozitis
- 11470 Davidminton
- 11471 Toshihirabayashi
- 11473 Barbaresco
- 11475 Velinský
- 11476 Stefanosimoni
- 11480 Velikij Ustyug
- 11481 Znannya
- 11484 Daudet
- 11485 Zinzendorf
- 11488 Zeleia
- 11492 Shimose
- 11494 Hibiki
- 11495 Fukunaga
- 11496 Grass
- 11498 Julgeerts
- 11499 Duras
- 11500 Tomaiyowit
- 11501 Ushimaru
- 11503 Isobeken
- 11504 Kazo
- 11506 Toulouse-Lautrec
- 11507 Danpascu
- 11508 Stolte
- 11509 Thersilochos
- 11510 Borges
- 11511 Billknopf
- 11514 Tsunenaga
- 11515 Oshijyo
- 11516 Arthurpage
- 11517 Esteracuna
- 11518 Jung
- 11519 Adler
- 11520 Fromm
- 11521 Erikson
- 11524 Pleyel
- 11528 Mie
- 11530 d'Indy
- 11532 Gullin
- 11533 Akebäck
- 11537 Guericke
- 11538 Brunico
- 11542 Solikamsk
- 11545 Hashimoto
- 11546 Miyoshimachi
- 11547 Griesser
- 11548 Jerrylewis
- 11552 Boucolion
- 11553 Scheria
- 11554 Asios
- 11569 Virgilsmith
- 11571 Daens
- 11572 Schindler
- 11573 Helmholtz
- 11574 d'Alviella
- 11575 Claudio
- 11577 Einasto
- 11578 Cimabue
- 11579 Tsujitsuka
- 11580 Bautzen
- 11581 Philipdejager
- 11582 Bleuler
- 11583 Breuer
- 11584 Ferenczi
- 11585 Orlandelassus
- 11588 Gottfriedkeller
- 11592 Clintkelly
- 11593 Uchikawa
- 11595 Monsummano
- 11596 Francetic
- 11598 Kubík
- 11600 Cipolla
- 11602 Miryang
- 11604 Novigrad
- 11605 Ranfagni
- 11606 Almary
- 11612 Obu
- 11614 Istropolitana
- 11615 Naoya
- 11620 Susanagordon
- 11621 Duccio
- 11622 Samuele
- 11623 Kagekatu
- 11625 Francelinda
- 11626 Church Stretton
- 11628 Katuhikoikeda
- 11636 Pezinok
- 11637 Yangjiachi
- 11652 Johnbrownlee
- 11656 Lipno
- 11657 Antonhajduk
- 11664 Kashiwagi
- 11665 Dirichlet
- 11666 Bracker
- 11667 Testa
- 11668 Balios
- 11669 Pascalscholl
- 11670 Fountain
- 11672 Cuney
- 11673 Baur
- 11675 Billboyle
- 11678 Brevard
- 11679 Brucebaker
- 11681 Ortner
- 11682 Shiwaku
- 11685 Adamcurry
- 11686 Samuelweissman
- 11688 Amandugan
- 11689 Frankxu
- 11690 Carodulaney
- 11691 Easterwood
- 11693 Grantelliott
- 11694 Esterhuysen
- 11695 Mattei
- 11696 Capen
- 11697 Estrella
- 11698 Fichtelman
- 11701 Madeleineyang
- 11702 Mifischer
- 11703 Glassman
- 11704 Gorin
- 11706 Rijeka
- 11707 Grigery
- 11708 Kathyfries
- 11709 Eudoxos
- 11710 Nataliehale
- 11711 Urquiza
- 11712 Kemcook
- 11713 Stubbs
- 11714 Mikebrown
- 11715 Harperclark
- 11716 Amahartman
- 11718 Hayward
- 11719 Hicklen
- 11720 Horodyskyj
- 11721 Shawnlowe
- 11723 Briankennedy
- 11724 Ronaldhsu
- 11725 Victoriahsu
- 11726 Edgerton
- 11727 Sweet
- 11728 Einer
- 11730 Yanhua
- 11735 Isabellecohen
- 11736 Viktorfischl
- 11737 Gregneat
- 11739 Baton Rouge
- 11740 Georgesmith
- 11743 Jachowski
- 11746 Thomjansen
- 11747 Libbykamen
- 11751 Davidcarroll
- 11752 Masatakesagai
- 11753 Geoffburbidge
- 11754 Herbig
- 11755 Paczyński
- 11756 Geneparker
- 11757 Salpeter
- 11758 Sargent
- 11759 Sunyaev
- 11760 Auwers
- 11761 Davidgill
- 11762 Vogel
- 11763 Deslandres
- 11764 Benbaillaud
- 11765 Alfredfowler
- 11766 Fredseares
- 11767 Milne
- 11768 Merrill
- 11769 Alfredjoy
- 11770 Rudominkowski
- 11771 Maestlin
- 11772 Jacoblemaire
- 11773 Schouten
- 11774 Jerne
- 11775 Köhler
- 11776 Milstein
- 11777 Hargrave
- 11778 Kingsford Smith
- 11779 Zernike
- 11780 Thunder Bay
- 11781 Alexroberts
- 11782 Nikolajivanov
- 11785 Migaic
- 11786 Bakhchivandji
- 11787 Baumanka
- 11788 Nauchnyj
- 11789 Kempowski
- 11790 Goode
- 11791 Sofiyavarzar
- 11792 Sidorovsky
- 11793 Chujkovia
- 11794 Yokokebukawa
- 11795 Fredrikbruhn
- 11796 Nirenberg
- 11797 Warell
- 11798 Davidsson
- 11799 Lantz
- 11800 Carrozzo
- 11801 Frigeri
- 11802 Ivanovski
- 11803 Turrini
- 11804 Zambon
- 11805 Novaković
- 11806 Thangjam
- 11807 Wannberg
- 11808 Platz
- 11809 Shinnaka
- 11810 Preusker
- 11811 Martinrubin
- 11812 Dongqiao
- 11813 Ingorichter
- 11814 Schwamb
- 11815 Viikinkoski
- 11816 Vasile
- 11817 Oguri
- 11818 Ulamec
- 11819 Millarca
- 11820 Mikiyasato
- 11821 Coleman
- 11823 Christen
- 11824 Alpaidze
- 11826 Yurijgromov
- 11827 Wasyuzan
- 11828 Vargha
- 11829 Tuvikene
- 11830 Jessenius
- 11831 Chaple
- 11832 Pustylnik
- 11833 Dixon
- 11836 Eileen
- 11842 Kap'bos
- 11844 Ostwald
- 11846 Verminnen
- 11847 Winckelmann
- 11848 Paullouka
- 11849 Fauvel
- 11852 Shoumen
- 11853 Runge
- 11854 Ludwigrichter
- 11855 Preller
- 11856 Nicolabonev
- 11858 Devinpoland
- 11859 Danngarcia
- 11860 Uedasatoshi
- 11861 Teruhime
- 11865 Nakamuramasatsug
- 11868 Kleinrichert
- 11870 Sverige
- 11871 Norge
- 11873 Kokuseibi
- 11874 Gringauz
- 11875 Rhône
- 11876 Doncarpenter
- 11878 Hanamiyama
- 11881 Mirstation
- 11885 Summanus
- 11886 Kraske
- 11887 Echemmon
- 11895 Dehant
- 11896 Camelbeeck
- 11897 Lemaire
- 11898 Dedeyn
- 11899 Weill
- 11900 Spinoy
- 11905 Giacometti
- 11907 Näränen
- 11908 Nicaragua
- 11911 Angel
- 11912 Piedade
- 11913 Svarna
- 11914 Sinachopoulos
- 11915 Nishiinoue
- 11916 Wiesloch
- 11921 Mitamasahiro
- 11924 Tanakatetuo
- 11925 Usubae
- 11926 Orinoco
- 11927 Mount Kent
- 11928 Akimotohiro
- 11929 Uchino
- 11930 Osamu
- 11933 Himuka
- 11934 Lundgren
- 11935 Olakarlsson
- 11936 Tremolizzo
- 11941 Archinal
- 11942 Guettard
- 11943 Davidhartley
- 11944 Shaftesbury
- 11945 Amsterdam
- 11946 Bayle
- 11947 Kimclijsters
- 11948 Justinehénin
- 11949 Kagayayutaka
- 11950 Morellet
- 11951 Marcoschioppa
- 11955 Russrobb
- 11956 Tamarakate
- 11958 Galiani
- 11959 Okunokeno
- 11963 Ignace
- 11964 Prigogine
- 11965 Catullus
- 11966 Plateau
- 11967 Boyle
- 11968 Demariotte
- 11969 Gay-Lussac
- 11970 Palitzsch
- 11974 Yasuhidefujita
- 11976 Josephthurn
- 11977 Leonrisoldi
- 11978 Makotomasako
- 11980 Ellis
- 11981 Boncompagni
- 11984 Manet
- 11987 Yonematsu
- 11997 Fassel
- 11998 Fermilab
- 12001 Gasbarini
- 12002 Suess
- 12003 Hideosugai
- 12005 Delgiudice
- 12006 Hruschka
- 12007 Fermat
- 12008 Kandrup
- 12010 Kovářov
- 12012 Kitahiroshima
- 12013 Sibatahosimi
- 12014 Bobhawkes
- 12016 Green
- 12022 Hilbert
- 12027 Masaakitanaka
- 12028 Annekinney
- 12031 Kobaton
- 12032 Ivory
- 12033 Anselmo
- 12035 Ruggieri
- 12040 Jacobi
- 12042 Laques
- 12044 Fabbri
- 12045 Klein
- 12047 Hideomitani
- 12050 Humecronyn
- 12051 Pícha
- 12052 Aretaon
- 12053 Turtlestar
- 12056 Yoshigeru
- 12057 Alfredsturm
- 12059 du Châtelet
- 12061 Alena
- 12062 Tilmanspohn
- 12064 Guiraudon
- 12065 Jaworski
- 12067 Jeter
- 12068 Khandrika
- 12069 Michaelbruno
- 12070 Kilkis
- 12071 Davykim
- 12072 Anupamakotha
- 12073 Larimer
- 12074 Carolinelau
- 12075 Legg
- 12077 Frankthorne
- 12078 Ikezi
- 12079 Kaibab
- 12083 Darone
- 12084 Unno
- 12085 Susanmoore
- 12086 Joshualevine
- 12087 Tiffanylin
- 12088 Macalintal
- 12089 Maichin
- 12091 Jesmalmquist
- 12092 Erinorourke
- 12093 Chrimatthews
- 12094 Mazumder
- 12095 Pinel
- 12097 Peterlowen
- 12099 Meigooni
- 12100 Amiens
- 12101 Trujillo
- 12102 Piazzolla
- 12104 Chesley
- 12106 Menghuan
- 12107 Reneebarcia
- 12108 Jamesaustin
- 12111 Ulm
- 12112 Sprague
- 12113 Hollows
- 12115 Robertgrimm
- 12117 Meagmessina
- 12118 Mirotsin
- 12119 Memamis
- 12120 Rebeccagrella
- 12121 Greenwald
- 12123 Pazin
- 12124 Hvar
- 12125 Jamesjones
- 12126 Chersidamas
- 12127 Mamiya
- 12128 Palermiti
- 12130 Mousa
- 12131 Echternach
- 12132 Wimfröger
- 12133 Titulaer
- 12134 Hansfriedeman
- 12135 Terlingen
- 12136 Martinryle
- 12137 Williefowler
- 12138 Olinwilson
- 12139 Tomcowling
- 12140 Johnbolton
- 12141 Chushayashi
- 12142 Franklow
- 12143 Harwit
- 12144 Einhart
- 12145 Behaim
- 12146 Ostriker
- 12147 Bramante
- 12148 Caravaggio
- 12149 Begas
- 12150 De Ruyter
- 12151 Oranje-Nassau
- 12152 Aratus
- 12153 Conon
- 12154 Callimachus
- 12155 Hyginus
- 12156 Ubels
- 12157 Können
- 12158 Tape
- 12159 Bettybiegel
- 12160 Karelwakker
- 12161 Avienius
- 12162 Bilderdijk
- 12163 Manilius
- 12164 Lowellgreen
- 12165 Ringleb
- 12166 Oliverherrmann
- 12167 Olivermüller
- 12168 Polko
- 12169 Munsterman
- 12170 Vanvollenhoven
- 12171 Johannink
- 12172 Niekdekort
- 12173 Lansbergen
- 12174 van het Reve
- 12175 Wimhermans
- 12176 Hidayat
- 12177 Raharto
- 12178 Dhani
- 12179 Taufiq
- 12180 Kistemaker
- 12182 Storm
- 12183 Caltonen
- 12184 Trevormerkley
- 12185 Gasprinskij
- 12186 Mitukurigen
- 12187 Lenagoryunova
- 12188 Kalaallitnunaat
- 12189 Dovgyj
- 12190 Sarkisov
- 12191 Vorontsova
- 12192 Gregbollendonk
- 12195 Johndavidniemann
- 12196 Weems
- 12197 Jan-Otto
- 12199 Sohlman
- 12200 Richlipe
- 12201 Spink
- 12202 Toddgregory
- 12203 Gehling
- 12204 Jonpineau
- 12205 Basharp
- 12206 Prats
- 12207 Matthewbeasley
- 12208 Jacobenglander
- 12209 Jennalynn
- 12210 Prykull
- 12211 Arnoschmidt
- 12214 Miroshnikov
- 12215 Jessicalounsbury
- 12218 Fleischer
- 12219 Grigorʹev
- 12220 Semenchur
- 12221 Ogatakoan
- 12222 Perotto
- 12223 Hoskin
- 12224 Jimcornell
- 12225 Yanfernández
- 12226 Caseylisse
- 12227 Penney
- 12229 Paulsson
- 12234 Shkuratov
- 12235 Imranakperov
- 12237 Coughlin
- 12238 Actor
- 12239 Carolinakou
- 12240 Droste-Hülshoff
- 12241 Lefort
- 12242 Koon
- 12244 Werfel
- 12246 Pliska
- 12247 Michaelsekerak
- 12248 Russellcarpenter
- 12249 Hannorein
- 12252 Gwangju
- 12257 Lassine
- 12258 Oscarwilde
- 12259 Szukalski
- 12261 Ledouanier
- 12262 Nishio
- 12267 Denneau
- 12270 Bozar
- 12272 Geddylee
- 12275 Marcelgoffin
- 12276 IJzer
- 12277 Tajimasatonokai
- 12278 Kisohinoki
- 12279 Laon
- 12280 Reims
- 12281 Chaumont
- 12282 Crombecq
- 12284 Pohl
- 12286 Poiseuille
- 12287 Langres
- 12288 Verdun
- 12289 Carnot
- 12291 Gohnaumann
- 12292 Dalton
- 12294 Avogadro
- 12295 Tasso
- 12298 Brecht
- 12301 Eötvös
- 12306 Pebronstein
- 12309 Tommygrav
- 12310 Londontario
- 12311 Ingemyr
- 12312 Väte
- 12317 Madicampbell
- 12318 Kästner
- 12320 Loschmidt
- 12321 Zurakowski
- 12323 Haeckel
- 12324 Van Rompaey
- 12325 Bogota
- 12326 Shirasaki
- 12327 Terbrüggen
- 12329 Liebermann
- 12335 Tatsukushi
- 12339 Carloo
- 12340 Stalle
- 12341 Calevoet
- 12342 Kudohmichiko
- 12343 Martinbeech
- 12344 Maryland
- 12349 Akebonozou
- 12350 Feuchtwanger
- 12352 Jepejacobsen
- 12353 Márquez
- 12354 Hemmerechts
- 12355 Coelho
- 12356 Carlscheele
- 12357 Toyako
- 12358 Azzurra
- 12359 Cajigal
- 12360 Unilandes
- 12362 Mumuryk
- 12363 Marinmarais
- 12364 Asadagouryu
- 12365 Yoshitoki
- 12366 Luisapla
- 12367 Ourinhos
- 12368 Mutsaers
- 12369 Pirandello
- 12370 Kageyasu
- 12372 Kagesuke
- 12373 Lancearmstrong
- 12374 Rakhat
- 12376 Cochabamba
- 12378 Johnston
- 12379 Thulin
- 12380 Sciascia
- 12381 Hugoclaus
- 12382 Niagara Falls
- 12383 Eboshi
- 12384 Luigimartella
- 12386 Nikolova
- 12387 Tomokofujiwara
- 12388 Kikunokai
- 12391 Ecoadachi
- 12395 Richnelson
- 12396 Amyphillips
- 12397 Peterbrown
- 12398 Pickhardt
- 12399 Bartolini
- 12400 Katumaru
- 12401 Tucholsky
- 12405 Nespoli
- 12406 Zvíkov
- 12407 Riccardi
- 12408 Fujioka
- 12409 Bukovanská
- 12410 Donald Duck
- 12411 Tannokayo
- 12412 Muchisachie
- 12413 Johnnyweir
- 12414 Bure
- 12415 Wakatatakayo
- 12418 Tongling
- 12421 Zhenya
- 12423 Slotin
- 12426 Racquetball
- 12431 Webster
- 12432 Usuda
- 12433 Barbieri
- 12435 Sudachi
- 12437 Westlane
- 12439 Okasaki
- 12440 Koshigayaboshi
- 12442 Beltramemass
- 12443 Paulsydney
- 12444 Prothoon
- 12445 Sirataka
- 12446 Juliabryant
- 12447 Yatescup
- 12448 Mr. Tompkins
- 12456 Genichiaraki
- 12460 Mando
- 12464 Manhattan
- 12465 Perth Amboy
- 12468 Zachotín
- 12469 Katsuura
- 12470 Pinotti
- 12471 Larryscherr
- 12472 Samadhi
- 12473 Levi-Civita
- 12477 Haiku
- 12478 Suzukiseiji
- 12479 Ohshimaosamu
- 12481 Streuvels
- 12482 Pajka
- 12485 Jenniferharris
- 12490 Leiden
- 12491 Musschenbroek
- 12492 Tanais
- 12493 Minkowski
- 12494 Doughamilton
- 12496 Ekholm
- 12497 Ekkehard
- 12498 Dragesco
- 12500 Desngai
- 12501 Nord
- 12503 Danielpeterson
- 12504 Nuest
- 12506 Pariser
- 12508 Darcysloe
- 12509 Pathak
- 12511 Patil
- 12512 Split
- 12513 Niven
- 12514 Schommer
- 12515 Suiseki
- 12516 Karenyoung
- 12517 Grayzeck
- 12519 Pullen
- 12522 Rara
- 12524 Conscience
- 12525 Kathleenloia
- 12526 de Coninck
- 12527 Anneraugh
- 12529 Reighard
- 12530 Richardson
- 12533 Edmond
- 12534 Janhoet
- 12535 Fazlurahman
- 12537 Kendriddle
- 12539 Chaikin
- 12540 Picander
- 12541 Makarska
- 12542 Laver
- 12545 Taniamurphy
- 12548 Erinriley
- 12553 Aaronritter
- 12556 Kyrobinson
- 12557 Caracol
- 12561 Howard
- 12562 Briangrazer
- 12564 Ikeller
- 12565 Khege
- 12566 Derichardson
- 12567 Herreweghe
- 12568 Kuffner
- 12571 Occhiogrosso
- 12572 Sadegh
- 12574 LONEOS
- 12575 Palmaria
- 12576 Oresme
- 12577 Samra
- 12578 Bensaur
- 12579 Ceva
- 12580 Antonini
- 12581 Rovinj
- 12583 Buckjean
- 12584 Zeljkoandreic
- 12585 Katschwarz
- 12586 Juliaspeyer
- 12588 Arseneau
- 12589 Davidanand
- 12590 Ballantine
- 12591 Bergey
- 12592 Brianchen
- 12593 Shashlov
- 12594 Sidorclare
- 12595 Amandashaw
- 12596 Shukla
- 12597 Williamdaniel
- 12598 Sierra
- 12599 Singhal
- 12601 Tiffanyswann
- 12602 Tammytam
- 12603 Tanchunghee
- 12604 Lisatate
- 12606 Apuleius
- 12607 Alcaeus
- 12608 Aesop
- 12609 Apollodoros
- 12610 Hãfez
- 12611 Ingres
- 12612 Daumier
- 12613 Hogarth
- 12614 Hokusai
- 12615 Mendesdeleon
- 12616 Lochner
- 12617 Angelusilesius
- 12618 Cellarius
- 12619 Anubelshunu
- 12620 Simaqian
- 12621 Alsufi
- 12622 Doppelmayr
- 12623 Tawaddud
- 12624 Mariacunitia
- 12625 Koopman
- 12626 Timmerman
- 12627 Maryedwards
- 12628 Acworthorr
- 12629 Jandeboer
- 12630 Verstappen
- 12631 Mariekebaan
- 12632 Mignonette
- 12633 Warmenhoven
- 12634 LOFAR
- 12635 Hennylamers
- 12636 Padrielli
- 12637 Gustavleonhardt
- 12638 Fransbrüggen
- 12639 Tonkoopman
- 12640 Reinbertdeleeuw
- 12641 Hubertushenrichs
- 12642 Davidjansen
- 12643 Henkolthof
- 12644 Robertwielinga
- 12645 Jacobrosales
- 12646 Avercamp
- 12647 Pauluspotter
- 12648 Ibarbourou
- 12649 Ascanios
- 12650 de Vries
- 12651 Frenkel
- 12652 Groningen
- 12653 van der Klis
- 12654 Heinofalcke
- 12655 Benferinga
- 12656 Gerdebruijn
- 12657 Bonch-Bruevich
- 12658 Peiraios
- 12659 Schlegel
- 12661 Schelling
- 12663 Björkegren
- 12664 Sonisenia
- 12665 Chriscarson
- 12666 Mikeauldridge
- 12668 Scottstarin
- 12669 Emilybrisnehan
- 12670 Passargea
- 12671 Thörnqvist
- 12672 Nygårdh
- 12673 Kiselman
- 12674 Rybalka
- 12675 Chabot
- 12676 Dianemerline
- 12677 Gritsavage
- 12678 Gerhardus
- 12679 Jamessimpson
- 12680 Bogdanovich
- 12681 Pevear
- 12682 Kawada
- 12686 Bezuglyj
- 12687 de Valory
- 12688 Baekeland
- 12690 Kochimiraikagaku
- 12694 Schleiermacher
- 12695 Utrecht
- 12696 Camus
- 12697 Verhaeren
- 12701 Chénier
- 12702 Panamarenko
- 12704 Tupolev
- 12706 Tanezaki
- 12708 Van Straten
- 12709 Bergen op Zoom
- 12710 Breda
- 12711 Tukmit
- 12714 Alkimos
- 12715 Godin
- 12716 Delft
- 12718 Le Gentil
- 12719 Pingré
- 12722 Petrarca
- 12727 Cavendish
- 12729 Berger
- 12734 Haruna
- 12738 Satoshimiki
- 12742 Delisle
- 12745 Kazujinishimura
- 12746 Yumeginga
- 12747 Michageffert
- 12749 Odokaigan
- 12750 Berthollet
- 12751 Kamihayashi
- 12752 Kvarnis
- 12753 Povenmire
- 12755 Balmer
- 12757 Yangtze
- 12758 Kabudari
- 12759 Joule
- 12760 Maxwell
- 12761 Pauwels
- 12762 Nadiavittor
- 12766 Paschen
- 12769 Kandakurenai
- 12771 Kimshin
- 12773 Lyman
- 12774 Pfund
- 12775 Brackett
- 12776 Reynolds
- 12777 Manuel
- 12780 Salamony
- 12782 Mauersberger
- 12787 Abetadashi
- 12788 Shigeno
- 12789 Salvadoraguirre
- 12790 Cernan
- 12793 Hosinokokai
- 12796 Kamenrider
- 12799 von Suttner
- 12800 Oobayashiarata
- 12801 Somekawa
- 12802 Hagino
- 12810 Okumiomote
- 12811 Rigonistern
- 12812 Cioni
- 12813 Paolapaolini
- 12814 Vittorio
- 12817 Federica
- 12818 Tomhanks
- 12819 Susumutakahasi
- 12820 Robinwilliams
- 12823 Pochintesta
- 12828 Batteas
- 12833 Kamenný Újezd
- 12834 Bomben
- 12835 Stropek
- 12838 Adamsmith
- 12840 Paolaferrari
- 12843 Ewers
- 12845 Crick
- 12846 Fullerton
- 12848 Agostino
- 12850 Axelmunthe
- 12852 Teply
- 12855 Tewksbury
- 12856 Autridas
- 12857 Johandemessie
- 12859 Marlamoore
- 12860 Turney
- 12861 Wacker
- 12863 Whitfield
- 12864 Ryandrake
- 12866 Yanamadala
- 12867 Joëloïc
- 12868 Onken
- 12869 Ejiaga
- 12870 Rolandmeier
- 12871 Samarasinha
- 12872 Susiestevens
- 12873 Clausewitz
- 12874 Poisson
- 12876 Estrada
- 12877 Rylangardner
- 12878 Erneschiller
- 12880 Juliegrady
- 12881 Yepeiyu
- 12883 Gassler
- 12885 Hannahguan
- 12891 Kassandraholt
- 12893 Mommert
- 12895 Balbastre
- 12896 Geoffroy
- 12897 Bougeret
- 12898 Mignard
- 12900 Rishabjain
- 12903 Isabellekatz
- 12906 Alexismacavoy
- 12907 Giannanilvo
- 12908 Yagudina
- 12909 Jaclifford
- 12910 Deliso
- 12911 Goodhue
- 12912 Streator
- 12915 Rinoliver
- 12916 Eteoneus
- 12919 Tomjohnson
- 12923 Zephyr
- 12924 Madisonicole
- 12926 Brianmason
- 12927 Pinocchio
- 12928 Nicolapozio
- 12929 Periboea
- 12931 Mario
- 12932 Conedera
- 12933 Muzzonigro
- 12934 Bisque
- 12935 Zhengzhemin
- 12936 Glennschneider
- 12937 Premadi
- 12938 Ingakamp
- 12939 Ignassnellen
- 12940 Gijsnelemans
- 12941 Franssnik
- 12942 van der Marel
- 12943 Selmademink
- 12944 Robwalrecht
- 12945 Reynierpeletier
- 12946 Portegieszwart
- 12947 Paulgroot
- 12948 Nathaliedegenaar
- 12949 Milogrootjen
- 12950 Michielrodenhuis
- 12951 Koenkuijken
- 12952 Joerivanleeuwen
- 12953 Jaapvreeling
- 12954 Hendrikcasimir
- 12955 Alexdekoter
- 12956 Ralphwijers
- 12972 Eumaios
- 12973 Melanthios
- 12974 Halitherses
- 12975 Efremov
- 12976 Kalinenkov
- 12977 Nanettevigil
- 12978 Ivashov
- 12979 Evgalvasilʹev
- 12980 Pruetz
- 12981 Tracicase
- 12982 Kaseybond
- 12983 Mattcox
- 12984 Lowry
- 12985 Mattgarrison
- 12986 Kretke
- 12987 Racalmuto
- 12988 Tiffanykapler
- 12989 Chriseanderson
- 12990 Josetillard
- 12991 Davidgriffiths
- 12992 Crumpler
- 12993 Luisafernanda
- 12994 Pitufo
- 12995 Wendellmendell
- 12996 Claudedomingue
- 12997 Lizjensen
- 12998 Thomas-Keprta
- 12999 Toruń
- 13001 Woodney
- 13002 Vickihorner
- 13003 Dickbeasley
- 13004 Aldaz
- 13005 Stankonyukhov
- 13006 Schwaar
- 13009 Voloshchuk
- 13010 Germantitov
- 13011 Loeillet
- 13014 Hasslacher
- 13015 Noradokei
- 13017 Owakenoomi
- 13018 Geoffjames
- 13024 Conradferdinand
- 13025 Zürich
- 13027 Geeraerts
- 13028 Klaustschira
- 13031 Durance
- 13032 Tarn
- 13033 Gardon
- 13034 Nobuowatanabe
- 13037 Potosi
- 13038 Woolston
- 13039 Awashima
- 13044 Wannes
- 13045 Vermandere
- 13046 Aliev
- 13049 Butov
- 13052 Las Casas
- 13053 Bertrandrussell
- 13055 Kreppein
- 13057 Jorgensen
- 13058 Alfredstevens
- 13059 Ducuroir
- 13062 Podarkes
- 13063 Purifoy
- 13064 Haemhouts
- 13069 Umbertoeco
- 13070 Seanconnery
- 13077 Edschneider
- 13079 Toots
- 13082 Gutiérrez
- 13084 Virchow
- 13085 Borlaug
- 13086 Sauerbruch
- 13087 Chastellux
- 13088 Filipportera
- 13092 Schrödinger
- 13093 Wolfgangpauli
- 13094 Shinshuueda
- 13096 Tigris
- 13097 Lamoraal
- 13101 Fransson
- 13107 Rudolfdvorak
- 13109 Berzelius
- 13111 Papacosmas
- 13112 Montmorency
- 13113 Williamyeats
- 13114 Isabelgodin
- 13115 Jeangodin
- 13116 Hortensia
- 13117 Pondicherry
- 13118 La Harpe
- 13121 Tisza
- 13122 Drava
- 13123 Tyson
- 13125 Tobolsk
- 13126 Calbuco
- 13127 Jeroenbrouwers
- 13128 Aleppo
- 13129 Poseidonios
- 13130 Dylanthomas
- 13131 Palmyra
- 13132 Ortelius
- 13133 Jandecleir
- 13140 Shinchukai
- 13145 Cavezzo
- 13146 Yuriko
- 13147 Foglia
- 13149 Heisenberg
- 13150 Paolotesi
- 13151 Polino
- 13154 Petermrva
- 13156 Mannoucyo
- 13157 Searfoss
- 13158 Carcano
- 13162 Ryokkochigaku
- 13163 Koyamachuya
- 13168 Danoconnell
- 13174 Timossi
- 13176 Kobedaitenken
- 13177 Hansschmidt
- 13178 Catalan
- 13179 Johncochrane
- 13180 Fourcroy
- 13181 Peneleos
- 13184 Augeias
- 13185 Agasthenes
- 13188 Okinawa
- 13192 Quine
- 13196 Rogerssmith
- 13197 Pontecorvo
- 13198 Banpeiyu
- 13200 Romagnani
- 13206 Baer
- 13207 Tamagawa
- 13208 Fraschetti
- 13209 Arnhem
- 13211 Stucky
- 13212 Jayleno
- 13213 Maclaurin
- 13214 Chirikov
- 13217 Alpbach
- 13219 Cailletet
- 13220 Kashiwagura
- 13221 Nao
- 13222 Ichikawakazuo
- 13223 Cenaceneri
- 13224 Takamatsuda
- 13225 Manfredi
- 13226 Soulié
- 13227 Poor
- 13229 Echion
- 13231 Blondelet
- 13232 Prabhakar
- 13234 Natashaowen
- 13235 Isiguroyuki
- 13238 Lambeaux
- 13239 Kana
- 13240 Thouvay
- 13241 Biyo
- 13243 Randhahn
- 13244 Dannymeyer
- 13246 Hannahshu
- 13247 Tianshi
- 13248 Fornasier
- 13249 Marcallen
- 13250 Danieladucato
- 13251 Viot
- 13253 Stejneger
- 13254 Kekulé
- 13256 Marne
- 13257 Seanntorres
- 13258 Bej
- 13259 Bhat
- 13260 Sabadell
- 13261 Ganeshvenu
- 13262 Ruhiyusuf
- 13264 Abdelhaq
- 13265 Terbunkley
- 13266 Maiabland
- 13267 Bolechowski
- 13268 Trevorcorbin
- 13269 Dahlstrom
- 13270 Brittonbounds
- 13271 Gingerbyrd
- 13272 Ericadavid
- 13273 Cornwell
- 13274 Roygross
- 13275 Kathgoetz
- 13278 Grotecloss
- 13279 Gutman
- 13280 Christihaas
- 13281 Aliciahall
- 13282 Sharikahagan
- 13283 Dahart
- 13285 Stephicks
- 13286 Adamchauvin
- 13292 Hernandezmon
- 13293 Mechelen
- 13294 Rockox
- 13298 Namatjira
- 13301 Hofsteen
- 13302 Kezmoh
- 13303 Asmitakumar
- 13305 Danielang
- 13307 Taralarsen
- 13308 Melissamayne
- 13310 Nilvo
- 13312 Orlowitz
- 13313 Kathypeng
- 13315 Hilana
- 13316 Llano
- 13319 Michaelmi
- 13320 Jessicamiles
- 13325 Valérienataf
- 13326 Ferri
- 13327 Reitsema
- 13328 Guetter
- 13329 Davidhardy
- 13330 Dondavis
- 13331 Helos
- 13332 Benkhoff
- 13333 Carsenty
- 13334 Tost
- 13335 Tobiaswolf
- 13336 Jillpernell
- 13337 Sampath
- 13339 Williamsmith
- 13341 Kellysweeney
- 13343 Annietaylor
- 13344 Upenieks
- 13346 Danielmiller
- 13349 Yarotsky
- 13350 Gmelin
- 13351 Zibeline
- 13352 Gyssens
- 13357 Werkhoven
- 13358 Revelle
- 13365 Tenzinyama
- 13367 Jiří
- 13368 Wlodekofman
- 13369 Youngblood
- 13370 Júliusbreza
- 13376 Dunphy
- 13380 Yamamohammed
- 13387 Irus
- 13389 Stacey
- 13390 Bouška
- 13395 Deconihout
- 13396 Midavaine
- 13403 Sarahmousa
- 13404 Norris
- 13405 Dorisbillings
- 13406 Sekora
- 13407 Ikukomakino
- 13408 Deadoklestic
- 13410 Arhale
- 13411 OLRAP
- 13412 Guerrieri
- 13413 Bobpeterson
- 13414 Grantham
- 13415 Stevenbland
- 13416 Berryman
- 13421 Holvorcem
- 13423 Bobwoolley
- 13424 Margalida
- 13425 Waynebrown
- 13433 Phelps
- 13434 Adamquade
- 13435 Rohret
- 13436 Enid
- 13437 Wellton-Persson
- 13438 Marthanalexander
- 13439 Frankiethomas
- 13441 Janmerlin
- 13446 Almarkim
- 13448 Edbryce
- 13449 Margaretgarland
- 13463 Antiphos
- 13473 Hokema
- 13474 Vʹyus
- 13475 Orestes
- 13476 Pepesales
- 13477 Utkin
- 13478 Fraunhofer
- 13479 Vet
- 13480 Potapov
- 13481 Aubele
- 13482 Igorfedorov
- 13484 Jinnylin
- 13486 Morgangibson
- 13487 Novosyadlyj
- 13488 Savanov
- 13489 Dmitrienko
- 13490 Allanchapman
- 13492 Vitalijzakharov
- 13493 Lockwood
- 13494 Treiso
- 13497 Ronstone
- 13498 Al Chwarizmi
- 13499 Steinberg
- 13500 Viscardy
- 13509 Guayaquil
- 13513 Manila
- 13514 Mikerudenko
- 13520 Félicienrops
- 13523 Vanhassel
- 13525 Paulledoux
- 13526 Libbrecht
- 13529 Yokaboshi
- 13530 Ninnemann
- 13531 Weizsäcker
- 13533 Junili
- 13534 Alain-Fournier
- 13540 Kazukitakahashi
- 13543 Butler
- 13551 Gadsden
- 13553 Masaakikoyama
- 13554 Decleir
- 13557 Lievetruwant
- 13559 Werth
- 13560 La Pérouse
- 13561 Kudogou
- 13562 Bobeggleton
- 13564 Kodomomiraikan
- 13565 Yotakanashi
- 13567 Urabe
- 13569 Oshu
- 13576 Gotoyoshi
- 13577 Ukawa
- 13579 Allodd
- 13580 de Saussure
- 13582 Tominari
- 13583 Bosret
- 13585 Justinsmith
- 13586 Copenhagen
- 13599 Lisbon
- 13602 Pierreboulez
- 13605 Nakamuraminoru
- 13606 Bean
- 13607 Vicars
- 13608 Andosatoru
- 13609 Lewicki
- 13610 Lilienthal
- 13615 Manulis
- 13620 Moynahan
- 13622 McArthur
- 13623 Seanwalker
- 13624 Abeosamu
- 13627 Yukitamayo
- 13633 Ivens
- 13638 Fiorenza
- 13640 Ohtateruaki
- 13641 de Lesseps
- 13642 Ricci
- 13643 Takushi
- 13644 Lynnanderson
- 13647 Rey
- 13650 Perimedes
- 13651 Wugang
- 13652 Elowitz
- 13653 Priscus
- 13654 Masuda
- 13657 Badinter
- 13658 Sylvester
- 13667 Samthurman
- 13668 Tanner
- 13669 Swammerdam
- 13672 Tarski
- 13673 Urysohn
- 13674 Bourge
- 13677 Alvin
- 13678 Shimada
- 13679 Shinanogawa
- 13680 Katyafrantseva
- 13681 Monty Python
- 13682 Pressberger
- 13684 Borbona
- 13686 Kongozan
- 13688 Oklahoma
- 13689 Succi
- 13690 Lesleymartin
- 13691 Akie
- 13693 Bondar
- 13699 Nickthomas
- 13700 Connors
- 13701 Roquebrune
- 13703 Romero
- 13704 Aletesi
- 13705 Llapasset
- 13710 Shridhar
- 13714 Stainbrook
- 13715 Steed
- 13716 Trevino
- 13717 Vencill
- 13718 Welcker
- 13721 Kevinwelsh
- 13722 Campobagatin
- 13723 Kolokolova
- 13724 Schwehm
- 13729 Nicolewen
- 13730 Willis
- 13732 Woodall
- 13733 Dylanyoung
- 13734 Buklad
- 13739 Nancyworden
- 13740 Lastrucci
- 13743 Rivkin
- 13744 Rickline
- 13745 Mikecosta
- 13748 Radaly
- 13750 Mattdawson
- 13751 Joelparker
- 13752 Grantstokes
- 13753 Jennivirta
- 13760 Rodriguez
- 13761 Dorristaylor
- 13764 Mcalanis
- 13765 Nansmith
- 13766 Bonham
- 13770 Commerson
- 13772 Livius
- 13774 Spurný
- 13775 Thébault
- 13777 Cielobuio
- 13787 Nagaishi
- 13788 Dansolander
- 13792 Kuščynskyj
- 13793 Laubernasconi
- 13798 Cecchini
- 13801 Kohlhase
- 13804 Hrazany
- 13806 Darmstrong
- 13808 Davewilliams
- 13815 Furuya
- 13816 Stülpner
- 13817 Genobechetti
- 13818 Ullery
- 13820 Schwartz
- 13822 Stevedodson
- 13824 Kramlik
- 13825 Booth
- 13830 ARLT
- 13840 Wayneanderson
- 13841 Blankenship
- 13843 Cowenbrown
- 13845 Jillburnett
- 13848 Cioffi
- 13849 Dunn
- 13850 Erman
- 13852 Ford
- 13853 Jenniferfritz
- 13857 Stafford
- 13858 Ericchristensen
- 13859 Fredtreasure
- 13860 Neely
- 13862 Elais
- 13868 Catalonia
- 13869 Fruge
- 13880 Wayneclark
- 13895 Letkasagjonica
- 13897 Vesuvius
- 13903 Darrylwatanabe
- 13904 Univinnitsa
- 13905 Maxbernstein
- 13906 Shunda
- 13908 Wölbern
- 13910 Iranolt
- 13911 Stempels
- 13912 Gammelgarn
- 13914 Galegant
- 13915 Yalow
- 13916 Bernolák
- 13917 Correggia
- 13918 Tsukinada
- 13920 Montecorvino
- 13921 Sgarbini
- 13922 Kremenia
- 13923 Peterhof
- 13926 Berners-Lee
- 13927 Grundy
- 13928 Aaronrogers
- 13930 Tashko
- 13931 Tonydenault
- 13932 Rupprecht
- 13933 Charleville
- 13934 Kannami
- 13937 Roberthargraves
- 13942 Shiratakihime
- 13943 Hankgreen
- 13952 Nykvist
- 13954 Born
- 13956 Banks
- 13957 NARIT
- 13962 Delambre
- 13963 Euphrates
- 13964 La Billardière
- 13975 Beatrixpotter
- 13977 Frisch
- 13978 Hiwasa
- 13980 Neuhauser
- 13982 Thunberg
- 13989 Murikabushi
- 13991 Kenphillips
- 13992 Cesarebarbieri
- 13993 Clemenssimmer
- 13994 Tuominen
- 13995 Tõravere
- 14002 Johngoodhue
- 14003 Waynegilmore
- 14004 Chikama
- 14005 Ferrínmoreiras
- 14006 Sakamotofumio
- 14007 Fiamingo
- 14008 Toniscarmato
- 14010 Jomonaomori
- 14012 Amedee
- 14014 Münchhausen
- 14015 Senancour
- 14016 Steller
- 14019 Pourbus
- 14024 Procol Harum
- 14025 Fallada
- 14026 Esquerdo
- 14027 Ichimoto
- 14028 Nakamurahiroshi
- 14031 Rozyo
- 14032 Mego
- 14036 Yasuhirotoyama
- 14037 Takakikasahara
- 14040 Andrejka
- 14041 Dürrenmatt
- 14042 Agafonov
- 14046 Keikai
- 14047 Kohichiro
- 14054 Dušek
- 14056 Kainar
- 14057 Manfredstoll
- 14060 Patersonewen
- 14061 Nagincox
- 14062 Cremaschini
- 14065 Flegel
- 14068 Hauserová
- 14069 Krasheninnikov
- 14071 Gadabird
- 14072 Volterra
- 14074 Riccati
- 14075 Kenwill
- 14077 Volfango
- 14080 Heppenheim
- 14088 Ancus
- 14092 Gaily
- 14094 Garneau
- 14097 Capdepera
- 14098 Šimek
- 14100 Weierstrass
- 14103 Manzoni
- 14104 Delpino
- 14105 Nakadai
- 14111 Kimamos
- 14114 Randyray
- 14115 Melaas
- 14116 Ogea
- 14119 Johnprince
- 14120 Espenak
- 14121 Stüwe
- 14122 Josties
- 14124 Kamil
- 14129 DiBucci
- 14134 Penkala
- 14135 Cynthialang
- 14141 Demeautis
- 14143 Hadfield
- 14145 Sciam
- 14146 Hughmaclean
- 14147 Wenlingshuguang
- 14148 Jimchamberlin
- 14149 Yakowitz
- 14153 Dianecaplain
- 14154 Negrelli
- 14155 Cibronen
- 14157 Pamelasobey
- 14158 Alananderson
- 14163 Johnchapman
- 14164 Hennigar
- 14172 Amanolivere
- 14174 Deborahsmall
- 14179 Skinner
- 14181 Koromházi
- 14182 Alley
- 14185 Van Ness
- 14186 Virgiliofos
- 14189 Sèvre
- 14190 Soldán
- 14203 Hocking
- 14206 Sehnal
- 14214 Hirsch
- 14217 Oaxaca
- 14220 Alexgibbs
- 14223 Dolby
- 14224 Gaede
- 14225 Alisahamilton
- 14226 Hamura
- 14230 Mariahines
- 14232 Curtismiller
- 14234 Davidhoover
- 14238 d'Artagnan
- 14244 Labnow
- 14250 Kathleenmartin
- 14252 Audreymeyer
- 14258 Katrinaminck
- 14262 Kratzer
- 14267 Zook
- 14268 Azeus
- 14274 Landstreet
- 14275 Dianemurray
- 14277 Parsa
- 14278 Perrenot
- 14282 Cruijff
- 14291 Savereide
- 14308 Hardeman
- 14309 Defoy
- 14310 Shuttleworth
- 14312 Polytech
- 14313 Dodaira
- 14314 Tokigawa
- 14315 Ogawamachi
- 14316 Higashichichibu
- 14317 Antonov
- 14318 Buzinov
- 14322 Shakura
- 14327 Lemke
- 14328 Granvik
- 14329 Michellethompson
- 14330 Tomlehrer
- 14331 Alyankovic
- 14332 Brucebarnett
- 14333 Alanfischer
- 14334 Lindarueger
- 14335 Alexosipov
- 14336 Falquero
- 14338 Shibakoukan
- 14339 Knorre
- 14342 Iglika
- 14345 Gritsevich
- 14346 Zhilyaev
- 14348 Cumming
- 14349 Nikitamikhalkov
- 14351 Tomaskohout
- 14354 Kolesnikov
- 14360 Ipatov
- 14361 Boscovich
- 14365 Jeanpaul
- 14366 Wilhelmraabe
- 14367 Hippokrates
- 14372 Paulgerhardt
- 14380 Bussey
- 14382 Woszczyk
- 14395 Tommorgan
- 14400 Baudot
- 14401 Reikoyukawa
- 14403 de Machault
- 14411 Clérambault
- 14412 Wolflojewski
- 14413 Geiger
- 14420 Massey
- 14424 Laval
- 14425 Fujimimachi
- 14426 Katotsuyoshi
- 14428 Lazaridis
- 14429 Coyne
- 14436 Morishita
- 14438 MacLean
- 14439 Evermeersch
- 14441 Atakanoseki
- 14443 Sekinenomatsu
- 14445 Koichi
- 14446 Kinkowan
- 14447 Hosakakanai
- 14449 Myogizinzya
- 14463 McCarter
- 14466 Hodge
- 14467 Vranckx
- 14468 Ottostern
- 14469 Komatsuataka
- 14479 Plekhanov
- 14486 Tuscia
- 14487 Sakaisakae
- 14491 Hitachiomiya
- 14492 Bistar
- 14495 Kazuakiwatanabe
- 14498 Bernini
- 14499 Satotoshio
- 14500 Kibo
- 14501 Tetsuokojima
- 14502 Morden
- 14504 Tsujimura
- 14505 Barentine
- 14509 Lučenec
- 14511 Nickel
- 14513 Alicelindner
- 14515 Koichisato
- 14517 Monitoma
- 14519 Ural
- 14526 Xenocrates
- 14533 Roy
- 14535 Kazuyukihanda
- 14537 Týn nad Vltavou
- 14539 Clocke Roeland
- 14541 Sacrobosco
- 14542 Karitskaya
- 14543 Sajigawasuiseki
- 14544 Ericjones
- 14550 Lehký
- 14551 Itagaki
- 14555 Shinohara
- 14558 Wangganchang
- 14564 Heasley
- 14566 Hōkūleʻa
- 14567 Nicovincenti
- 14568 Zanotta
- 14570 Burkam
- 14571 Caralexander
- 14572 Armando
- 14573 Montebugnoli
- 14574 Payette
- 14575 Jamesblanc
- 14576 Jefholley
- 14582 Conlin
- 14583 Lester
- 14584 Lawson
- 14588 Pharrams
- 14589 Stevenbyrnes
- 14593 Everett
- 14594 Jindrašilhán
- 14595 Peaker
- 14596 Bergstralh
- 14597 Waynerichie
- 14598 Larrysmith
- 14600 Gainsbourg
- 14605 Hyeyeonchoi
- 14606 Hifleischer
- 14611 Elsaadawi
- 14612 Irtish
- 14613 Sanchez
- 14616 Van Gaal
- 14617 Lasvergnas
- 14619 Plotkin
- 14621 Tati
- 14622 Arcadiopoveda
- 14623 Kamoun
- 14624 Prymachenko
- 14627 Emilkowalski
- 14631 Benbryan
- 14632 Flensburg
- 14643 Morata
- 14654 Rajivgupta
- 14656 Lijiang
- 14659 Gregoriana
- 14664 Vandervelden
- 14669 Beletic
- 14674 INAOE
- 14678 Pinney
- 14679 Susanreed
- 14681 Estellechurch
- 14682 Davidhirsch
- 14683 Remy
- 14684 Reyes
- 14693 Selwyn
- 14694 Skurat
- 14696 Lindawilliams
- 14697 Ronsawyer
- 14698 Scottyoung
- 14699 Klarasmi
- 14700 Johnreid
- 14701 Aizu
- 14702 Benclark
- 14708 Slaven
- 14719 Sobey
- 14724 SNO
- 14727 Suggs
- 14728 Schuchardt
- 14734 Susanstoker
- 14739 Edgarchavez
- 14741 Teamequinox
- 14764 Kilauea
- 14789 GAISH
- 14790 Beletskij
- 14791 Atreus
- 14792 Thyestes
- 14793 Gardner-Vandy
- 14794 Konetskiy
- 14795 Syoyou
- 14796 Emmabullock
- 14797 Timrose
- 14799 Mitchschulte
- 14802 Robwardell
- 14803 Gooding
- 14804 Mariekschmidt
- 14805 Amandaostwald
- 14806 Karner
- 14807 Chrisanders
- 14808 Mijjum
- 14809 Zoewilbur
- 14810 Balistreri
- 14812 Rosario
- 14814 Gurij
- 14815 Rutberg
- 14818 Mindeli
- 14819 Nikolaylaverov
- 14820 Aizuyaichi
- 14821 Motaeno
- 14825 Fieber-Beyer
- 14826 Nicollier
- 14827 Hypnos
- 14829 Povalyaeva
- 14831 Gentileschi
- 14832 Alechinsky
- 14833 Vilenius
- 14834 Isaev
- 14835 Holdridge
- 14836 Maxfrisch
- 14843 Tanna
- 14845 Hegel
- 14846 Lampedusa
- 14850 Nagashimacho
- 14853 Shimokawa
- 14871 Pyramus
- 14872 Hoher List
- 14873 Shoyo
- 14876 Dampier
- 14877 Zauberflöte
- 14880 Moa
- 14885 Paskoff
- 14888 Kanazawashi
- 14901 Hidatakayama
- 14902 Miyairi
- 14909 Kamchatka
- 14911 Fukamatsu
- 14914 Moreux
- 14917 Taco
- 14918 Gonzálezalegre
- 14919 Robertohaver
- 14922 Ohyama
- 14925 Naoko
- 14926 Hoshide
- 14927 Satoshi
- 14937 Thirsk
- 14939 Norikura
- 14940 Freiligrath
- 14941 Tomswift
- 14942 Stevebaker
- 14947 Luigibussolino
- 14948 Bartuška
- 14950 Alexandradelbo
- 14953 Bevilacqua
- 14959 TRIUMF
- 14960 Yule
- 14961 d'Auteroche
- 14962 Masanoriabe
- 14963 Toshikazu
- 14964 Robertobacci
- 14965 Bonk
- 14966 Jurijvega
- 14967 Madrid
- 14968 Kubáček
- 14969 Willacather
- 14972 Olihainaut
- 14973 Rossirosina
- 14974 Počátky
- 14975 Serasin
- 14976 Josefčapek
- 14977 Bressler
- 14980 Gustavbrom
- 14981 Uenoiwakura
- 14988 Tryggvason
- 14989 Tutte
- 14990 Zermelo
- 14994 Uppenkamp
- 14995 Archytas
- 14998 Ogosemachi
- 14999 Karasaki
- 15000 CCD
- 15001 Fuzhou
- 15002 Shahriarbayegan
- 15003 Midori
- 15004 Vallerani
- 15005 Guerriero
- 15006 Samcristoforetti
- 15007 Edoardopozio
- 15008 Delahodde
- 15009 Johnwheeler
- 15010 Storrie-Lombardi
- 15011 Castro-Tirado
- 15014 Annagekker
- 15017 Cuppy
- 15019 Gingold
- 15020 Brandonimber
- 15021 Alexkardon
- 15022 Francinejackson
- 15023 Ketover
- 15025 Uwontario
- 15026 Davidscott
- 15028 Soushiyou
- 15030 Matthewkroll
- 15031 Lemus
- 15032 Alexlevin
- 15034 Décines
- 15036 Giovannianselmi
- 15037 Chassagne
- 15040 Zhangchao
- 15041 Paperetti
- 15042 Anndavgui
- 15045 Walesdymond
- 15050 Heddal
- 15052 Emileschweitzer
- 15053 Bochníček
- 15056 Barbaradixon
- 15057 Whitson
- 15058 Billcooke
- 15067 Zhuangtianshan
- 15068 Wiegert
- 15071 Hallerstein
- 15072 Landolt
- 15076 Joellewis
- 15077 Edyalge
- 15083 Tianhuili
- 15088 Licitra
- 15091 Howell
- 15092 Beegees
- 15093 Lestermackey
- 15094 Polymele
- 15099 Janestrohm
- 15106 Swanson
- 15107 Toepperwein
- 15109 Wilber
- 15111 Winters
- 15112 Arlenewolfe
- 15115 Yvonneroe
- 15116 Jaytate
- 15118 Elizabethsears
- 15120 Mariafélix
- 15126 Brittanyanderson
- 15128 Patrickjones
- 15129 Sparks
- 15131 Alanalda
- 15132 Steigmeyer
- 15133 Sullivan
- 15139 Connormcarty
- 15144 Araas
- 15145 Ritageorge
- 15146 Halpov
- 15147 Siegfried
- 15148 Michaelmaryott
- 15149 Loufaix
- 15150 Salsa
- 15151 Wilmacherup
- 15155 Ahn
- 15160 Wygoda
- 15168 Marijnfranx
- 15169 Wilfriedboland
- 15170 Erikdeul
- 15171 Xandertielens
- 15199 Rodnyanskaya
- 15202 Yamada-Houkoku
- 15203 Grishanin
- 15212 Yaroslavlʹ
- 15214 Duart
- 15215 Lachlanmaclean
- 15220 Sumerkin
- 15224 Penttilä
- 15228 Ronmiller
- 15230 Alona
- 15231 Ehdita
- 15238 Hisaohori
- 15239 Stenhammar
- 15246 Kumeta
- 15248 Hidekazu
- 15249 Capodimonte
- 15250 Nishiyamahiro
- 15252 Yoshiken
- 15258 Alfilipenko
- 15262 Abderhalden
- 15263 Erwingroten
- 15264 Delbrück
- 15265 Ernsting
- 15267 Kolyma
- 15268 Wendelinefroger
- 15273 Ruhmkorff
- 15276 Diebel
- 15278 Pâquet
- 15282 Franzmarc
- 15294 Underwood
- 15295 Tante Riek
- 15296 Tantetruus
- 15298 Minde
- 15299 Rådbo
- 15301 Marutesser
- 15303 Hatoyamamachi
- 15304 Wikberg
- 15308 Ulfdanielsson
- 15309 Bragée
- 15310 Meir
- 15311 Västerberg
- 15312 Wandt
- 15313 Ynnerman
- 15314 Stenbergwieser
- 15315 Sundin
- 15316 Okagakimachi
- 15318 Innsbruck
- 15321 Donnadean
- 15329 Sabena
- 15330 de Almeida
- 15332 CERN
- 15335 Satoyukie
- 15338 Dufault
- 15339 Pierazzo
- 15342 Assisi
- 15343 Von Wohlgemuth
- 15346 Bonifatius
- 15347 Colinstuart
- 15350 Naganuma
- 15351 Yamaguchimamoru
- 15353 Meucci
- 15355 Maupassant
- 15358 Kintner
- 15359 Dressler
- 15360 Moncalvo
- 15363 Ysaÿe
- 15364 Kenglover
- 15368 Katsuji
- 15370 Kanchi
- 15371 Steward
- 15372 Agrigento
- 15374 Teta
- 15375 Laetitiafoglia
- 15376 Marták
- 15378 Artin
- 15379 Alefranz
- 15381 Spadolini
- 15382 Vian
- 15384 Samková
- 15385 Dallolmo
- 15386 Nicolini
- 15387 Hanazukayama
- 15388 Coelum
- 15389 Geflorsch
- 15390 Znojil
- 15391 Steliomancinelli
- 15392 Budějický
- 15395 Rükl
- 15396 Howardmoore
- 15397 Ksoari
- 15399 Hudec
- 15402 Suzaku
- 15403 Mérignac
- 15406 Bleibtreu
- 15407 Udakiyoo
- 15412 Schaefer
- 15413 Beaglehole
- 15414 Pettirossi
- 15415 Rika
- 15417 Babylon
- 15418 Sergiospinelli
- 15420 Aedouglass
- 15421 Adammalin
- 15425 Welzl
- 15427 Shabas
- 15434 Mittal
- 15436 Dexius
- 15438 Joegotobed
- 15440 Eioneus
- 15448 Siegwarth
- 15452 Ibramohammed
- 15453 Brasileirinhos
- 15460 Manca
- 15461 Johnbird
- 15462 Stumegan
- 15465 Buchroeder
- 15466 Barlow
- 15467 Aflorsch
- 15468 Mondriaan
- 15469 Ohmura
- 15476 Narendra
- 15492 Nyberg
- 15494 Lucylake
- 15495 Bogie
- 15497 Lucca
- 15499 Cloyd
- 15500 Anantpatel
- 15501 Pepawlowski
- 15502 Hypeirochus
- 15503 Estradioto
- 15506 Preygel
- 15507 Rengarajan
- 15509 Annejing
- 15510 Phoeberounds
- 15512 Snyder
- 15513 Emmermann
- 15516 Langleben
- 15522 Trueblood
- 15523 Grenville
- 15526 Kokura
- 15528 Martinsmedina
- 15530 Kuber
- 15531 Matusch
- 15533 Saturnino
- 15543 Elizateel
- 15544 Hushicheng
- 15546 Sunyufeng
- 15547 Xujiping
- 15548 Kalinowski
- 15550 Sydney
- 15551 Paddock
- 15552 Sandashounkan
- 15553 Carachang
- 15554 Chenhuaipu
- 15555 Luochihi
- 15556 Hanafy
- 15557 Kimcochran
- 15559 Abigailhines
- 15563 Remsberg
- 15564 Lateef
- 15565 Benjaminsteele
- 15566 Elizabethbaker
- 15567 Giacomelli
- 15568 Jathe
- 15569 Feinberg
- 15570 von Wolff
- 15573 Richardjoseph
- 15574 Stephaniehass
- 15575 Manyakumar
- 15576 Munday
- 15577 Gywilliams
- 15578 Bagnall
- 15579 Richardbeattie
- 15581 Adamkelly
- 15582 Russellburrows
- 15583 Hanick
- 15584 Yumaokamoto
- 15587 Sotsukamoto
- 15594 Castillo
- 15595 Melwincheng
- 15596 Yongshiangtham
- 15597 Piotrlazarek
- 15598 Kazantsev
- 15599 Richardlarson
- 15603 Kimyoonji
- 15604 Fruits
- 15606 Winer
- 15608 Owens
- 15609 Kosmaczewski
- 15611 Leejoonyoung
- 15612 Parkmincheol
- 15613 Rajihyun
- 15614 Pillinger
- 15617 Fallowfield
- 15618 Lorifritz
- 15619 Albertwu
- 15620 Beltrami
- 15621 Erikhovland
- 15622 Westrich
- 15623 Maitaneam
- 15624 Lamberton
- 15625 Agrawal
- 15627 Hong
- 15628 Gonzales
- 15629 Sriner
- 15630 Disanti
- 15631 Dellorusso
- 15632 Magee-Sauer
- 15634 Ahluwalia
- 15635 Andrewhager
- 15651 Tlepolemos
- 15663 Periphas
- 15669 Pshenichner
- 15671 Suzannedébarbat
- 15672 Sato-Norio
- 15673 Chetaev
- 15674 Elfving
- 15675 Goloseevo
- 15676 Almoisheev
- 15691 Maslov
- 15695 Fedorshpig
- 15699 Lyytinen
- 15702 Olegkotov
- 15703 Yrjölä
- 15705 Hautot
- 15708 Metsoc
- 15710 Böcklin
- 15715 Osuginaoki
- 15716 Narahara
- 15718 Imokawa
- 15723 Girraween
- 15724 Zille
- 15727 Ianmorison
- 15728 Karlmay
- 15729 Yumikoitahana
- 15732 Vitusbering
- 15735 Andakerkhoven
- 15736 Hamanasu
- 15739 Matsukuma
- 15740 Hyakumangoku
- 15742 Laurabassi
- 15745 Yuliya
- 15752 Eluard
- 15753 Rathsman
- 15760 Albion
- 15761 Schumi
- 15762 Rühmann
- 15763 Nagakubo
- 15766 Strahlenberg
- 15779 Scottroberts
- 15783 Briancox
- 15785 de Villegas
- 15786 Hoshioka
- 15790 Keizan
- 15791 Yoshiewatanabe
- 15797 Tachikoutenkibu
- 15803 Parisi
- 15804 Yenisei
- 15805 Murakamitakehiko
- 15806 Kohei
- 15808 Zelter
- 15810 Arawn
- 15811 Nüsslein-Volhard
- 15817 Lucianotesi
- 15818 DeVeny
- 15819 Alisterling
- 15821 Iijimatatsushi
- 15822 Genefahnestock
- 15825 Capecchi
- 15828 Sincheskul
- 15834 McBride
- 15837 Mariovalori
- 15838 Auclair
- 15840 Hiroshiendou
- 15841 Yamaguchi
- 15843 Comcom
- 15845 Bambi
- 15846 Billfyfe
- 15849 Billharper
- 15851 Chrisfleming
- 15853 Benedettafoglia
- 15854 Numa
- 15855 Mariasalvatore
- 15856 Yanokoji
- 15857 Touji
- 15858 Davidwoods
- 15860 Siráň
- 15861 Ispahan
- 15868 Akiyoshidai
- 15869 Tullius
- 15870 Obůrka
- 15882 Dingzhong
- 15884 Maspalomas
- 15887 Daveclark
- 15889 Xiaoyuhe
- 15890 Prachatice
- 15891 Alissazhang
- 15896 Birkhoff
- 15897 Beňačková
- 15898 Kharasterteam
- 15899 Silvain
- 15902 Dostál
- 15903 Rolandflorrie
- 15904 Halstead
- 15905 Berthier
- 15906 Yoshikaneda
- 15907 Robot
- 15908 Bertoni
- 15910 Shinkamigoto
- 15911 Davidgauthier
- 15913 Telemachus
- 15916 Shigeoyamada
- 15917 Rosahavel
- 15918 Thereluzia
- 15921 Kintaikyo
- 15922 Masajisaito
- 15924 Axelmartin
- 15925 Rokycany
- 15929 Ericlinton
- 15938 Bohnenblust
- 15939 Fessenden
- 15941 Stevegauthier
- 15945 Raymondavid
- 15946 Satinský
- 15947 Milligan
- 15949 Rhaeticus
- 15950 Dallago
- 15954 Divjotbedi
- 15955 Johannesgmunden
- 15957 Gemoore
- 15960 Hluboká
- 15963 Koeberl
- 15964 Billgray
- 15965 Robertcox
- 15967 Clairearmstrong
- 15968 Waltercugno
- 15969 Charlesgreen
- 15970 Robertbrownlee
- 15971 Hestroffer
- 15976 Bhansali
- 15977 Pyraechmes
- 15985 Bhatnagar
- 15986 Fienga
- 15988 Parini
- 15989 Anusha
- 15992 Cynthia
- 16000 Neilgehrels
- 16002 Bertin
- 16007 Kaasalainen
- 16012 Jamierubin
- 16013 Schmidgall
- 16014 Sinha
- 16015 Snell
- 16016 Boylan
- 16017 Street
- 16019 Edwardsu
- 16020 Tevelde
- 16021 Caseyvaughn
- 16022 Wissnergross
- 16023 Alisonyee
- 16026 Victoriapidgeon
- 16028 Anushree
- 16034 Prechoudhary
- 16035 Sasandford
- 16036 Moroz
- 16037 Sheehan
- 16039 Zeglin
- 16043 Yichenzhang
- 16044 Kurtbachmann
- 16046 Gregnorman
- 16048 Eddiedai
- 16049 D'Amore
- 16051 Bernero
- 16053 Brennan
- 16055 Dellisanti
- 16058 Doshi
- 16059 Marybuda
- 16060 Dahliadry
- 16062 Buncher
- 16064 Davidharvey
- 16065 Borel
- 16066 Richardbressler
- 16067 Brandonfan
- 16068 Citron
- 16069 Marshafolger
- 16070 Charops
- 16073 Gaskin
- 16074 Georgekaplan
- 16075 Meglass
- 16076 Barryhaase
- 16077 Arayhamilton
- 16078 Carolhersh
- 16079 Imada
- 16080 Danielfeng
- 16083 Jórvík
- 16085 Laffan
- 16087 Rhythmgarg
- 16088 Jessgoldstein
- 16089 Lamb
- 16090 Lukaszewski
- 16091 Malchiodi
- 16092 Anudeepgolla
- 16094 Scottmccord
- 16095 Lorenball
- 16100 Hausknecht
- 16101 Notskas
- 16102 Barshannon
- 16103 Lorsolomon
- 16104 Stesullivan
- 16105 Marksaunders
- 16106 Carmagnola
- 16107 Chanmugam
- 16110 Paganetti
- 16111 Donstrittmatter
- 16112 Vitaris
- 16113 Ahmed
- 16114 Alyono
- 16116 Balakrishnan
- 16117 Herbst
- 16118 Therberens
- 16119 Bronner
- 16120 Burnim
- 16121 Burrell
- 16122 Wenyicai
- 16123 Jessiecheng
- 16124 Timdong
- 16125 Carriehsu
- 16127 Farzan-Kashani
- 16128 Kirfrieda
- 16129 Kevingao
- 16130 Giovine
- 16131 Kaganovich
- 16132 Angelakim
- 16135 Ivarsson
- 16142 Leung
- 16144 Korsten
- 16147 Jeanli
- 16148 Amaraifeji
- 16150 Clinch
- 16154 Dabramo
- 16155 Buddy
- 16157 Toastmasters
- 16158 Monty
- 16163 Suhanli
- 16164 Yangli
- 16165 Licht
- 16166 Jonlii
- 16167 Oertli
- 16168 Palmen
- 16169 Janapaty
- 16172 Jayaweera
- 16174 Parihar
- 16175 Rypatterson
- 16177 Pelzer
- 16179 Jeloka
- 16180 Rapoport
- 16185 Allisonjia
- 16186 Helenajiang
- 16189 Riehl
- 16190 Kabirjolly
- 16191 Rubyroe
- 16192 Laird
- 16193 Nickaiser
- 16194 Roderick
- 16197 Bluepeter
- 16198 Búzios
- 16199 Rozenblyum
- 16202 Srivastava
- 16203 Jessicastahl
- 16207 Montgomery
- 16209 Sterner
- 16211 Samirsur
- 16212 Theberge
- 16214 Venkatachalam
- 16215 Venkatraman
- 16217 Peterbroughton
- 16218 Mintakeyes
- 16219 Venturelli
- 16220 Mikewagner
- 16221 Kevinyang
- 16222 Donnanderson
- 16223 Racheljoseph
- 16225 Georgebaldo
- 16226 Beaton
- 16227 Emilykang
- 16228 Adhamkassem
- 16229 Kavyakoneru
- 16230 Benson
- 16231 Jessberger
- 16232 Chijagerbs
- 16234 Bosse
- 16236 Stebrehmer
- 16237 Emmakratcha
- 16238 Chappe
- 16239 Dower
- 16241 Dvorsky
- 16242 Licato
- 16243 Rosenbauer
- 16244 Brož
- 16245 Katielu
- 16246 Cantor
- 16247 Esner
- 16248 Fox
- 16249 Cauchy
- 16250 Delbó
- 16251 Barbifrank
- 16252 Franfrost
- 16253 Griffis
- 16254 Harper
- 16255 Hampton
- 16258 Willhayes
- 16259 Housinger
- 16260 Sputnik
- 16261 Iidemachi
- 16262 Rikurtz
- 16264 Richlee
- 16265 Lemay
- 16266 Johconnell
- 16267 Mcdermott
- 16268 Mcneeley
- 16269 Merkord
- 16271 Duanenichols
- 16273 Oneill
- 16274 Pavlica
- 16275 Charlesma
- 16276 Virginiama
- 16277 Mallada
- 16280 Groussin
- 16319 Xiamenerzhong
- 16355 Buber
- 16356 Univbalttech
- 16357 Risanpei
- 16358 Plesetsk
- 16367 Astronomiasvecia
- 16368 Città di Alba
- 16372 Demichele
- 16395 Ioannpravednyj
- 16397 Carlahayden
- 16398 Hummel
- 16399 Grokhovsky
- 16402 Olgapopova
- 16405 Testudo
- 16406 Oszkiewicz
- 16407 Oiunskij
- 16413 Abulghazi
- 16414 Le Procope
- 16418 Lortzing
- 16419 Kovalev
- 16421 Roadrunner
- 16424 Davaine
- 16425 Chuckyeager
- 16435 Fándly
- 16438 Knöfel
- 16439 Yamehoshinokawa
- 16441 Kirchner
- 16444 Godefroy
- 16445 Klimt
- 16447 Vauban
- 16449 Kigoyama
- 16450 Messerschmidt
- 16452 Goldfinger
- 16459 Barth
- 16463 Nayoro
- 16465 Basilrowe
- 16466 Piyashiriyama
- 16479 Paulze
- 16481 Thames
- 16494 Oka
- 16497 Toinevermeylen
- 16498 Passau
- 16503 Ayato
- 16505 Sulzer
- 16507 Fuuren
- 16513 Vasks
- 16514 Stevelia
- 16515 Usmanʹgrad
- 16516 Efremlevitan
- 16518 Akihikoito
- 16522 Tell
- 16524 Hausmann
- 16525 Shumarinaiko
- 16528 Terakado
- 16529 Dangoldin
- 16543 Rosetta
- 16544 Hochlehnert
- 16552 Sawamura
- 16555 Nagaomasami
- 16560 Daitor
- 16561 Rawls
- 16563 Ob
- 16564 Coriolis
- 16578 Essjayess
- 16583 Oersted
- 16587 Nagamori
- 16588 Johngee
- 16589 Hastrup
- 16590 Brunowalter
- 16594 Sorachi
- 16596 Stephenstrauss
- 16598 Brugmansia
- 16599 Shorland
- 16602 Anabuki
- 16623 Muenzel
- 16624 Hoshizawa
- 16625 Kunitsugu
- 16626 Thumper
- 16641 Esteban
- 16644 Otemaedaigaku
- 16645 Aldalara
- 16646 Sparrman
- 16647 Robbydesmet
- 16648 Hossi
- 16649 Masayasu
- 16650 Sakushingakuin
- 16666 Liroma
- 16669 Rionuevo
- 16671 Tago
- 16672 Bedini
- 16674 Birkeland
- 16675 Torii
- 16676 Tinne
- 16680 Minamitanemachi
- 16682 Donati
- 16683 Alepieri
- 16689 Vistula
- 16690 Fabritius
- 16693 Moseley
- 16695 Terryhandley
- 16696 Villamayor
- 16700 Seiwa
- 16701 Volpe
- 16702 Buxner
- 16703 Richardstrauss
- 16704 Taisukekaneko
- 16705 Reinhardt
- 16706 Svojsík
- 16707 Norman
- 16709 Auratian
- 16710 Kluyver
- 16711 Ka-Dar
- 16713 Airashi
- 16714 Arndt
- 16715 Trettenero
- 16718 Morikawa
- 16719 Mizokami
- 16723 Fumiofuke
- 16724 Ullilotzmann
- 16725 Toudono
- 16730 Nijisseiki
- 16731 Mitsumata
- 16736 Tongariyama
- 16740 Kipthorne
- 16742 Zink
- 16744 Antonioleone
- 16745 Zappa
- 16749 Vospini
- 16750 Marisandoz
- 16755 Cayley
- 16756 Keuskamp
- 16757 Luoxiahong
- 16759 Furuyama
- 16760 Masanori
- 16761 Hertz
- 16765 Agnesi
- 16766 Righi
- 16770 Angkor Wat
- 16777 Bosma
- 16779 Mittelman
- 16781 Renčín
- 16783 Bychkov
- 16788 Alyssarose
- 16790 Yuuzou
- 16794 Cucullia
- 16796 Shinji
- 16797 Wilkerson
- 16801 Petřínpragensis
- 16802 Rainer
- 16804 Bonini
- 16807 Terasako
- 16809 Galápagos
- 16810 Pavelaleksandrov
- 16813 Ronmastaler
- 16817 Onderlička
- 16826 Daisuke
- 16829 Richardfrench
- 16847 Sanpoloamosciano
- 16852 Nuredduna
- 16853 Masafumi
- 16856 Banach
- 16857 Goodall
- 16861 Lipovetsky
- 16869 Košinár
- 16874 Kurtwahl
- 16878 Tombickler
- 16879 Campai
- 16881 Angelinmathew
- 16883 Adeenedenton
- 16887 Blouke
- 16888 Michaelbarber
- 16892 Vaissière
- 16900 Lozère
- 16901 Johnbrooks
- 16906 Giovannisilva
- 16908 Groeselenberg
- 16909 Miladejager
- 16912 Rhiannon
- 16915 Bredthauer
- 16920 Larrywalker
- 16929 Hurník
- 16930 Respighi
- 16934 Kevinmeng
- 16938 Nalanimiller
- 16939 Rishabhmisra
- 16944 Wangler
- 16946 Farnham
- 16947 Wikrent
- 16951 Carolus Quartus
- 16952 Peteschultz
- 16953 Besicovitch
- 16954 Annikamorgan
- 16958 Klaasen
- 16961 Mullahy
- 16962 Elizawoolard
- 16967 Marcosbosso
- 16969 Helamuda
- 16972 Neish
- 16973 Gaspari
- 16974 Iphthime
- 16975 Delamere
- 16982 Tsinghua
- 16984 Veillet
- 16986 Archivestef
- 16996 Dahir
- 16997 Garrone
- 16998 Estelleweber
- 16999 Ajstewart
- 17000 Medvedev
- 17001 Braydennoh
- 17002 Kouzel
- 17003 Poojanpandya
- 17004 Sinkevich
- 17008 Anamariaperez
- 17009 Jasonping
- 17014 Melaniequan
- 17015 Shriyareddy
- 17019 Aldo
- 17020 Hopemeraengus
- 17022 Huisjen
- 17023 Abbott
- 17024 Costello
- 17025 Pilachowski
- 17028 Frankstadermann
- 17029 Cuillandre
- 17030 Sierks
- 17031 Piethut
- 17032 Edlu
- 17033 Rusty
- 17034 Vasylshev
- 17035 Velichko
- 17036 Krugly
- 17037 Danfleisch
- 17038 Wake
- 17039 Yeuseyenka
- 17040 Almeida
- 17041 Castagna
- 17042 Madiraju
- 17043 Santucci
- 17044 Mubdirahman
- 17045 Markert
- 17046 Kenway
- 17047 Tateschrock
- 17048 Nicolesegaran
- 17049 Miron
- 17050 Weiskopf
- 17051 Oflynn
- 17052 Senthilvel
- 17053 Ashayshah
- 17056 Boschetti
- 17058 Rocknroll
- 17059 Elvis
- 17060 Mikecombi
- 17061 Tegler
- 17062 Bardot
- 17063 Papaloizou
- 17064 Ashnashah
- 17065 Shrilashah
- 17066 Ginagallant
- 17069 Adyantshankar
- 17070 Yanniksingh
- 17071 Spiride
- 17072 Athiviraham
- 17073 Alexblank
- 17074 Shreshth
- 17075 Pankonin
- 17076 Betti
- 17077 Pampaloni
- 17078 Sellers
- 17079 Lavrovsky
- 17081 Jaytee
- 17084 Sundararajan
- 17086 Ruima
- 17088 Giupalazzolo
- 17089 Mercado
- 17090 Mundaca
- 17091 Senthalir
- 17092 Sharanya
- 17093 Supanklang
- 17094 Sarahsyed
- 17095 Mahadik
- 17096 Takemaru
- 17097 Ronneuman
- 17098 Ikedamai
- 17099 Emilytianshi
- 17100 Kamiokanatsu
- 17101 Sakenova
- 17102 Begzhigitova
- 17103 Kadyrsizova
- 17104 McCloskey
- 17106 Tidball
- 17108 Patricorbett
- 17115 Justiniano
- 17119 Alexisrodrz
- 17121 Fernandonido
- 17124 Rishavalera
- 17125 Vijayakumar
- 17126 Sophiawang
- 17127 Ryanwestcott
- 17128 Stephyoshida
- 17130 Alexzhang
- 17131 Paulazhu
- 17138 Burgosrosario
- 17139 Malyshev
- 17140 Yangkevin
- 17141 Bhatia
- 17143 Andrewbrinton
- 17144 Laurenchen
- 17145 Hollycheng
- 17147 Mariafields
- 17148 Arifirester
- 17149 Victoriagraf
- 17151 Zanderhill
- 17156 Kennethseitz
- 17160 Jetly
- 17162 Nithinkavi
- 17163 Vasifedoseev
- 17166 Secombe
- 17167 Olgarozanova
- 17169 Tatarinov
- 17170 Vsevustinov
- 17173 Evgenyamosov
- 17174 Krivitsky
- 17176 Viktorov
- 17178 Caitlinrita
- 17179 Codina
- 17180 Rupertli
- 17184 Carlrogers
- 17185 Mcdavid
- 17186 Sergivanov
- 17190 Retopezzoli
- 17192 Loharu
- 17193 Alexeybaran
- 17195 Jimrichardson
- 17196 Mastrodemos
- 17197 Matjazbone
- 17198 Gorjup
- 17199 Jasonliu
- 17201 Matjazhumar
- 17205 McCreery
- 17208 Pokrovska
- 17210 Nadinemeister
- 17211 Brianfisher
- 17214 Neervannan
- 17215 Slivan
- 17216 Scottstuart
- 17217 Pollner
- 17218 Stgeorge
- 17219 Gianninoto
- 17220 Johnpenna
- 17222 Perlmutter
- 17224 Randoross
- 17225 Alanschorn
- 17226 Anaiahbre
- 17228 Adrianeliz
- 17231 Rohanwagh
- 17233 Stanshapiro
- 17235 Ellawesson
- 17236 Westover
- 17238 Brianwu
- 17240 Gletorrence
- 17241 Wooden
- 17242 Leslieyoung
- 17245 Yixie
- 17246 Christophedumas
- 17247 Vanverst
- 17248 Ellieyang
- 17249 Eliotyoung
- 17250 Genelucas
- 17251 Vondracek
- 17253 VonSecker
- 17257 Strazzulla
- 17258 Whalen
- 17260 Kušnirák
- 17262 Winokur
- 17265 Debennett
- 17268 Yasonik
- 17269 Dicksmith
- 17270 Nolthenius
- 17273 Karnik
- 17277 Jarrydlevine
- 17278 Viggh
- 17279 Jeniferevans
- 17280 Shelly
- 17281 Mattblythe
- 17283 Ustinov
- 17285 Bezout
- 17286 Bisei
- 17305 Caniff
- 17314 Aisakos
- 17351 Pheidippos
- 17354 Matrosov
- 17356 Vityazev
- 17357 Lucataliano
- 17358 Lozino-Lozinskij
- 17365 Thymbraeus
- 17368 Korn
- 17369 Eremeeva
- 17399 Andysanto
- 17402 Valeryshuvalov
- 17403 Masciarelli
- 17407 Teige
- 17408 McAdams
- 17410 Zitarrosa
- 17412 Kroll
- 17415 Czesławlang
- 17427 Poe
- 17428 Charleroi
- 17429 Ianhowarth
- 17431 Sainte-Colombe
- 17435 di Giovanni
- 17437 Stekene
- 17438 Quasimodo
- 17439 Juliesan
- 17445 Avatcha
- 17446 Mopaku
- 17447 Heindl
- 17452 Amurreka
- 17458 Dick
- 17459 Andreashofer
- 17460 Mang
- 17461 Shigosenger
- 17462 Takahisa
- 17465 Inawashiroko
- 17466 Vargasllosa
- 17470 Mitsuhashi
- 17472 Dinah
- 17473 Freddiemercury
- 17484 Ganghofer
- 17486 Hodler
- 17488 Mantl
- 17489 Trenker
- 17492 Hippasos
- 17493 Wildcat
- 17494 Antaviana
- 17496 Augustinus
- 17501 Tetsuro
- 17502 Manabeseiji
- 17503 Celestechild
- 17506 Walschap
- 17508 Takumadan
- 17509 Ikumadan
- 17516 Kogayukihito
- 17518 Redqueen
- 17519 Pritsak
- 17520 Hisayukiyoshio
- 17521 Kiek
- 17543 Sosva
- 17544 Kojiroishikawa
- 17546 Osadakentaro
- 17547 Nestebovelli
- 17555 Kenkennedy
- 17556 Pierofrancesca
- 17563 Tsuneyoshi
- 17567 Hoshinoyakata
- 17579 Lewkopelew
- 17597 Stefanzweig
- 17600 Dobřichovice
- 17601 Sheldonschafer
- 17602 Dr. G.
- 17603 Qoyllurwasi
- 17606 Wumengchao
- 17607 Táborsko
- 17608 Terezín
- 17610 Riggsbee
- 17611 Jožkakubík
- 17612 Whiteknight
- 17614 Mariamartínez
- 17615 Takeomasaru
- 17617 Takimotoikuo
- 17625 Joseflada
- 17627 Humptydumpty
- 17629 Koichisuzuki
- 17637 Blaschke
- 17638 Sualan
- 17640 Mount Stromlo
- 17645 Inarimori
- 17649 Brunorossi
- 17651 Tajimi
- 17652 Nepoti
- 17653 Bochner
- 17656 Hayabusa
- 17657 Himawari
- 17670 Liddell
- 17673 Houkidaisen
- 17681 Tweedledum
- 17683 Kanagawa
- 17693 Wangdaheng
- 17694 Jiránek
- 17696 Bombelli
- 17697 Evanchen
- 17698 Racheldavis
- 17700 Oleksiygolubov
- 17702 Kryštofharant
- 17703 Bombieri
- 17712 Fatherwilliam
- 17720 Manuboccuni
- 17734 Boole
- 17736 Zhifeiyu
- 17737 Sigmundjähn
- 17744 Jodiefoster
- 17746 Haigha
- 17748 Uedashoji
- 17749 Dulbecco
- 17759 Hatta
- 17764 Schatzman
- 17768 Tigerlily
- 17770 Baumé
- 17771 Elsheimer
- 17776 Troska
- 17777 Ornicar
- 17779 Migomueller
- 17781 Kepping
- 17782 Paulbailey
- 17783 Scottbrunner
- 17784 Banerjee
- 17785 Wesleyfuller
- 17789 Carolcarty
- 17792 Kathconnelly
- 17793 Delorio
- 17794 Kowalinski
- 17795 Elysiasegal
- 17797 Philfrankel
- 17799 Petewilliams
- 17801 Zelkowitz
- 17803 Barish
- 17805 Švestka
- 17806 Adolfborn
- 17807 Ericpearce
- 17810 Brittholden
- 17813 Alisonhuenger
- 17815 Kulawik
- 17821 Bölsche
- 17822 Tonireland
- 17823 Bartels
- 17825 Juranitch
- 17826 Normanwisdom
- 17830 Andreajurgens
- 17831 Ussery
- 17832 Pitman
- 17835 Anoelsuri
- 17836 Canup
- 17841 Karenlucci
- 17842 Jorgegarcia
- 17843 Shaelucero
- 17844 Judson
- 17848 Mordechai
- 17851 Kaler
- 17853 Ronaldsayer
- 17855 Geffert
- 17856 Gomes
- 17857 Hsieh
- 17858 Beaugé
- 17859 Galinaryabova
- 17860 Roig
- 17865 Odden
- 17869 Descamps
- 17870 Pannett
- 17873 Palaciosdeborao
- 17879 Robutel
- 17880 Vanessaparker
- 17881 Radmall
- 17882 Thielemann
- 17883 Scobuchanan
- 17884 Jeffthompson
- 17885 Brianbeyt
- 17886 Ramazan
- 17889 Liechty
- 17891 Buraliforti
- 17892 Morecambewise
- 17893 Arlot
- 17897 Gallardo
- 17898 Scottsheppard
- 17899 Mariacristina
- 17900 Leiferman
- 17901 Korinriske
- 17902 Britbaker
- 17903 Shamieh
- 17904 Annekoupal
- 17905 Kabtamu
- 17906 Shapovalov
- 17907 Danielgude
- 17908 Chriskuyu
- 17909 Nikhilshukla
- 17910 Munyan
- 17911 Robertsnyder
- 17913 Strode
- 17914 Joannelee
- 17917 Cartan
- 17919 Licandro
- 17920 Zarnecki
- 17921 Aldeobaldia
- 17923 Strother
- 17925 Dougweinberg
- 17926 Jameswu
- 17927 Ghoshal
- 17928 Neuwirth
- 17929 Sully
- 17930 Kennethott
- 17932 Viswanathan
- 17933 Haraguchi
- 17934 Deleon
- 17935 Vinhoward
- 17936 Nilus
- 17938 Tamsendrew
- 17939 Shanethread
- 17940 Kandyjarvis
- 17941 Horbatt
- 17942 Whiterabbit
- 17944 Lansbury
- 17945 Hawass
- 17950 Grover
- 17951 Fenska
- 17952 Folsom
- 17954 Hopkins
- 17955 Sedransk
- 17956 Andrewlenoir
- 17958 Schoof
- 17959 Camierickson
- 17960 Liberatore
- 17961 Mariagorodnitsky
- 17962 Andrewherron
- 17963 Vonderheydt
- 17965 Brodersen
- 17967 Bacampbell
- 17969 Truong
- 17970 Palepu
- 17971 Samuelhowell
- 17972 Ascione
- 17976 Schulman
- 17980 Vanschaik
- 17982 Simcmillan
- 17983 Buhrmester
- 17984 Ahantonioli
- 17988 Joannehsieh
- 17991 Joshuaegan
- 17992 Japellegrino
- 17993 Kluesing
- 17995 Jolinefan
- 18001 Lijing
- 18004 Krystosek
- 18009 Patrickgeer
- 18012 Marsland
- 18013 Shedletsky
- 18015 Semenkovich
- 18016 Grondahl
- 18019 Dascoli
- 18020 Amend
- 18021 Waldman
- 18022 Pepper
- 18024 Dobson
- 18026 Juliabaldwin
- 18027 Gokcay
- 18028 Ramchandani
- 18032 Geiss
- 18043 Laszkowska
- 18055 Fernhildebrandt
- 18059 Cavalieri
- 18060 Zarex
- 18075 Donasharma
- 18077 Dianeingrao
- 18079 Lion-Stoppato
- 18084 Adamwohl
- 18086 Emilykraft
- 18087 Yamanaka
- 18088 Roberteunice
- 18090 Kevinkuo
- 18091 Iranmanesh
- 18092 Reinhold
- 18095 Frankblock
- 18099 Flamini
- 18100 Lebreton
- 18101 Coustenis
- 18102 Angrilli
- 18104 Mahalingam
- 18106 Blume
- 18110 HASI
- 18111 Pinet
- 18112 Jeanlucjosset
- 18113 Bibring
- 18114 Rosenbush
- 18115 Rathbun
- 18116 Prato
- 18117 Jonhodge
- 18119 Braude
- 18120 Lytvynenko
- 18121 Konovalenko
- 18122 Forestamartin
- 18123 Pavan
- 18124 Leeperry
- 18125 Brianwilson
- 18127 Denversmith
- 18128 Wysner
- 18132 Spector
- 18142 Adamsidman
- 18148 Bellier
- 18149 Colombatti
- 18150 Lopez-Moreno
- 18151 Licchelli
- 18152 Heidimanning
- 18155 Jasonschuler
- 18156 Kamisaibara
- 18157 Craigwright
- 18158 Nigelreuel
- 18159 Andrewcook
- 18160 Nihon Uchu Forum
- 18161 Koshiishi
- 18162 Denlea
- 18163 Jennalewis
- 18167 Buttani
- 18169 Amaldi
- 18170 Ramjeawan
- 18171 Romaneskue
- 18174 Khachatryan
- 18175 Jenniferchoy
- 18176 Julianhong
- 18177 Harunaga
- 18180 Irenesun
- 18182 Wiener
- 18184 Dianepark
- 18189 Medeobaldia
- 18190 Michaelpizer
- 18191 Rayhe
- 18192 Craigwallace
- 18193 Hollilydrury
- 18196 Rowberry
- 18197 Brandondotson
- 18198 Benjaminbyron
- 18199 Shackelford
- 18200 Flaviarommel
- 18201 Proudfoot
- 18202 Nichols-Fleming
- 18203 Schörghofer
- 18204 Emilycostello
- 18205 Camarca
- 18228 Hyperenor
- 18235 Lynden-Bell
- 18236 Bernardburke
- 18237 Kenfreeman
- 18238 Frankshu
- 18239 Ekers
- 18240 Mould
- 18241 Genzel
- 18242 Peebles
- 18243 Gunn
- 18244 Anneila
- 18263 Anchialos
- 18268 Dardanos
- 18278 Dymas
- 18281 Tros
- 18282 Ilos
- 18284 Tsereteli
- 18285 Vladplatonov
- 18286 Kneipp
- 18287 Verkin
- 18288 Nozdrachev
- 18289 Yokoyamakoichi
- 18290 Sumiyoshi
- 18291 Wani
- 18292 Zoltowski
- 18293 Pilyugin
- 18294 Rudenko
- 18295 Borispetrov
- 18301 Konyukhov
- 18302 Körner
- 18321 Bobrov
- 18322 Korokan
- 18334 Drozdov
- 18335 San Cassiano
- 18343 Asja
- 18349 Dafydd
- 18359 Jakobstaude
- 18360 Sachs
- 18365 Shimomoto
- 18368 Flandrau
- 18376 Quirk
- 18377 Vetter
- 18379 Josévandam
- 18381 Massenet
- 18395 Schmiedmayer
- 18396 Nellysachs
- 18398 Bregenz
- 18399 Tentoumushi
- 18400 Muramatsushigeru
- 18403 Atsuhirotaisei
- 18404 Kenichi
- 18412 Kruszelnicki
- 18413 Adamspencer
- 18418 Ujibe
- 18426 Maffei
- 18430 Balzac
- 18431 Stazzema
- 18434 Mikesandras
- 18441 Cittàdivinci
- 18449 Rikwouters
- 18453 Nishiyamayukio
- 18456 Mišík
- 18457 Syoheiyamamoto
- 18458 Caesar
- 18460 Pecková
- 18461 Seiichikanno
- 18462 Riccò
- 18467 Nagatatsu
- 18469 Hakodate
- 18472 Hatada
- 18473 Kikuchijun
- 18493 Demoleon
- 18497 Nevězice
- 18498 Cesaro
- 18499 Showalter
- 18501 Luria
- 18505 Caravelli
- 18509 Bellini
- 18510 Chasles
- 18520 Wolfratshausen
- 18524 Tagatoshihiro
- 18529 Liangdongcai
- 18531 Strakonice
- 18542 Broglio
- 18548 Christoffel
- 18550 Maoyisheng
- 18551 Bovet
- 18553 Kinkakuji
- 18555 Courant
- 18556 Battiato
- 18560 Coxeter
- 18561 Fengningding
- 18562 Ellenkey
- 18563 Danigoldman
- 18564 Caseyo
- 18565 Selg
- 18567 Segenthau
- 18568 Thuillot
- 18572 Rocher
- 18574 Jeansimon
- 18579 Duongtuyenvu
- 18581 Batllo
- 18583 Francescopedani
- 18593 Wangzhongcheng
- 18596 Superbus
- 18601 Zafar
- 18602 Lagillespie
- 18605 Jacqueslaskar
- 18609 Shinobuyama
- 18610 Arthurdent
- 18611 Baudelaire
- 18617 Puntel
- 18623 Pises
- 18624 Prévert
- 18626 Michaelcarr
- 18627 Rogerbonnet
- 18628 Taniasagrati
- 18631 Maurogherardini
- 18632 Danielsson
- 18634 Champigneulles
- 18635 Frouard
- 18636 Villedepompey
- 18637 Liverdun
- 18638 Nouet
- 18639 Aoyunzhiyuanzhe
- 18643 van Rysselberghe
- 18644 Arashiyama
- 18647 Václavhübner
- 18649 Fabrega
- 18653 Christagünt
- 18656 Mergler
- 18658 Rajdev
- 18659 Megangross
- 18661 Zoccoli
- 18662 Erinwhite
- 18663 Lynnta
- 18664 Rafaelta
- 18665 Sheenahayes
- 18668 Gottesman
- 18669 Lalitpatel
- 18670 Shantanugaur
- 18671 Zacharyrice
- 18672 Ashleyamini
- 18675 Amiamini
- 18676 Zdeňkaplavcová
- 18679 Heatherenae
- 18680 Weirather
- 18681 Caseylipp
- 18689 Rodrick
- 18697 Kathanson
- 18698 Racharles
- 18699 Quigley
- 18702 Sadowski
- 18704 Brychristian
- 18707 Annchi
- 18708 Danielappel
- 18709 Laurawong
- 18720 Jerryguo
- 18725 Atacama
- 18727 Peacock
- 18728 Grammier
- 18729 Potentino
- 18730 Wingip
- 18731 Vilʹbakirov
- 18734 Darboux
- 18735 Chubko
- 18737 Aliciaworley
- 18739 Larryhu
- 18745 San Pedro
- 18747 Lexcen
- 18749 Ayyubguliev
- 18750 Leonidakimov
- 18751 Yualexandrov
- 18755 Meduna
- 18766 Broderick
- 18768 Sarahbates
- 18770 Yingqiuqilei
- 18771 Sisiliang
- 18773 Bredehoft
- 18774 Lavanture
- 18775 Donaldeng
- 18776 Coulter
- 18777 Hobson
- 18779 Hattyhong
- 18780 Kuncham
- 18781 Indaram
- 18782 Joanrho
- 18783 Sychamberlin
- 18785 Betsywelsh
- 18786 Tyjorgenson
- 18787 Kathermann
- 18788 Carriemiller
- 18789 Metzger
- 18790 Ericaburden
- 18794 Kianafrank
- 18796 Acosta
- 18800 Terresadodge
- 18801 Noelleoas
- 18803 Hillaryoas
- 18805 Kellyday
- 18806 Zachpenn
- 18809 Meileawertz
- 18812 Aliadler
- 18814 Ivanovsky
- 18818 Yasuhiko
- 18821 Markhavel
- 18823 Zachozer
- 18824 Graves
- 18825 Alicechai
- 18826 Leifer
- 18830 Pothier
- 18836 Raymundto
- 18838 Shannon
- 18839 Whiteley
- 18840 Yoshioba
- 18841 Hruška
- 18843 Ningzhou
- 18845 Cichocki
- 18851 Winmesser
- 18855 Sarahgutman
- 18857 Lalchandani
- 18858 Tecleveland
- 18861 Eugenishmidt
- 18862 Warot
- 18871 Grauer
- 18872 Tammann
- 18873 Larryrobinson
- 18874 Raoulbehrend
- 18876 Sooner
- 18877 Stevendodds
- 18880 Toddblumberg
- 18883 Domegge
- 18887 Yiliuchen
- 18891 Kamler
- 18903 Matsuura
- 18905 Weigan
- 18907 Kevinclaytor
- 18910 Nolanreis
- 18912 Kayfurman
- 18918 Nishashah
- 18923 Jennifersass
- 18924 Vinjamoori
- 18928 Pontremoli
- 18930 Athreya
- 18932 Robinhood
- 18935 Alfandmedina
- 18938 Zarabeth
- 18939 Sariancel
- 18943 Elaisponton
- 18944 Sawilliams
- 18946 Massar
- 18947 Cindyfulton
- 18948 Hinkle
- 18949 Tumaneng
- 18950 Marakessler
- 18953 Laurensmith
- 18954 Sarahbounds
- 18956 Jessicarnold
- 18957 Mijacobsen
- 18961 Hampfreeman
- 18964 Fairhurst
- 18965 Lazenby
- 18969 Valfriedmann
- 18970 Jenniharper
- 18973 Crouch
- 18974 Brungardt
- 18976 Kunilraval
- 18979 Henryfong
- 18980 Johannatang
- 18983 Allentran
- 18984 Olathe
- 18987 Irani
- 18991 Tonivanov
- 18992 Katharvard
- 18994 Nhannguyen
- 18996 Torasan
- 18997 Mizrahi
- 19002 Tongkexue
- 19003 Erinfrey
- 19004 Chirayath
- 19005 Teckman
- 19007 Nirajnathan
- 19008 Kristibutler
- 19009 Galenmaly
- 19017 Susanlederer
- 19019 Sunflower
- 19022 Penzel
- 19023 Varela
- 19025 Arthurpetron
- 19029 Briede
- 19034 Santorini
- 19066 Ellarie
- 19079 Hernández
- 19080 Martínfierro
- 19081 Mravinskij
- 19082 Vikchernov
- 19083 Mizuki
- 19084 Eilestam
- 19091 Hagen
- 19096 Leonfridman
- 19119 Dimpna
- 19120 Doronina
- 19121 Rathnasree
- 19122 Amandabosh
- 19123 Stephenlevine
- 19126 Ottohahn
- 19127 Olegefremov
- 19129 Loos
- 19130 Tytgat
- 19132 Le Clézio
- 19135 Takashionaka
- 19136 Strassmann
- 19137 Copiapó
- 19139 Apian
- 19140 Jansmit
- 19141 Poelkapelle
- 19142 Langemarck
- 19144 Shinichiakiyama
- 19148 Alaska
- 19149 Boccaccio
- 19155 Lifeson
- 19156 Heco
- 19159 Taenakano
- 19160 Chikayoshitomi
- 19161 Sakawa
- 19162 Wambsganss
- 19165 Nariyuki
- 19173 Virginiaterése
- 19175 Peterpiot
- 19178 Walterbothe
- 19182 Pitz
- 19183 Amati
- 19185 Guarneri
- 19188 Dittebesard
- 19189 Stradivari
- 19190 Morihiroshi
- 19197 Akasaki
- 19204 Joshuatree
- 19208 Starrfield
- 19210 Higayoshihiro
- 19224 Orosei
- 19226 Peiresc
- 19228 Uemuraikuo
- 19230 Sugazi
- 19234 Victoriahibbs
- 19235 van Schurman
- 19243 Bunting
- 19246 Megumisasaki
- 19250 Poullain
- 19251 Totziens
- 19254 Shojitomoko
- 19258 Gongyi
- 19262 Lucarubini
- 19263 Lavater
- 19268 Morstadt
- 19282 Zhangcunhao
- 19287 Paronelli
- 19288 Egami
- 19290 Schroeder
- 19291 Karelzeman
- 19293 Dedekind
- 19294 Weymouth
- 19298 Zhongkeda
- 19300 Xinglong
- 19303 Chinacyo
- 19304 Yoshidaseiko
- 19306 Voves
- 19307 Hanayama
- 19310 Osawa
- 19311 Susantresch
- 19313 Shibatakazunari
- 19314 Nakamuratetsu
- 19315 Aizunisshinkan
- 19318 Somanah
- 19331 Stefanovitale
- 19348 Cueca
- 19349 Denjoy
- 19353 Pierrethierry
- 19354 Fredkoehler
- 19355 Merpalehmann
- 19364 Semafor
- 19366 Sudingqiang
- 19367 Pink Floyd
- 19370 Yukyung
- 19379 Labrecque
- 19383 Rolling Stones
- 19384 Winton
- 19386 Axelcronstedt
- 19390 Deledda
- 19392 Oyamada
- 19393 Davidthompson
- 19395 Barrera
- 19397 Lagarini
- 19398 Creedence
- 19400 Emileclaus
- 19407 Standing Bear
- 19410 Guisard
- 19411 Collinarnold
- 19413 Grantlewis
- 19415 Parvamenon
- 19416 Benglass
- 19417 Madelynho
- 19419 Pinkham
- 19420 Vivekbuch
- 19421 Zachulett
- 19423 Hefter
- 19424 Andrewsong
- 19425 Nicholasrapp
- 19426 Leal
- 19428 Gracehsu
- 19429 Grubaugh
- 19430 Kristinaufer
- 19433 Naftz
- 19434 Bahuffman
- 19436 Marycole
- 19437 Jennyblank
- 19438 Khaki
- 19439 Allisontjong
- 19440 Sumatijain
- 19441 Trucpham
- 19442 Brianrice
- 19443 Yanzhong
- 19444 Addicott
- 19446 Muroski
- 19447 Jessicapearl
- 19448 Jenniferling
- 19450 Sussman
- 19452 Keeney
- 19453 Murdochorne
- 19454 Henrymarr
- 19456 Pimdouglas
- 19457 Robcastillo
- 19458 Legault
- 19461 Feingold
- 19462 Ulissedini
- 19463 Emilystoll
- 19464 Ciarabarr
- 19465 Amandarusso
- 19466 Darcydiegel
- 19467 Amandanagy
- 19470 Wenpingchen
- 19473 Marygardner
- 19475 Mispagel
- 19476 Denduluri
- 19477 Teresajentz
- 19478 Jaimeflores
- 19482 Harperlee
- 19484 Vanessaspini
- 19487 Rosscoleman
- 19488 Abramcoley
- 19494 Gerbs
- 19495 Terentyeva
- 19496 Josephbarone
- 19497 Pineda
- 19499 Eugenybiryukov
- 19500 Hillaryfultz
- 19504 Vladalekseev
- 19506 Angellopez
- 19509 Niigata
- 19517 Robertocarlos
- 19518 Moulding
- 19521 Chaos
- 19523 Paolofrisi
- 19524 Acaciacoleman
- 19528 Delloro
- 19531 Charton
- 19533 Garrison
- 19534 Miyagi
- 19535 Rowanatkinson
- 19539 Anaverdu
- 19542 Lindperkins
- 19543 Burgoyne
- 19544 Avramkottke
- 19547 Collier
- 19550 Samabates
- 19551 Peterborden
- 19563 Brzezinska
- 19564 Ajburnetti
- 19568 Rachelmarie
- 19570 Jessedouglas
- 19572 Leahmarie
- 19573 Cummings
- 19574 Davidedwards
- 19575 Feeny
- 19577 Bobbyfisher
- 19578 Kirkdouglas
- 19582 Blow
- 19584 Sarahgerin
- 19585 Zachopkins
- 19587 Keremane
- 19589 Kirkland
- 19591 Michaelklein
- 19593 Justinkoh
- 19595 Lafer-Sousa
- 19596 Spegorlarson
- 19597 Ryanlee
- 19598 Luttrell
- 19599 Brycemelton
- 19602 Austinminor
- 19603 Monier
- 19612 Noordung
- 19614 Montelongo
- 19617 Duhamel
- 19618 Maša
- 19619 Bethbell
- 19620 Auckland
- 19625 Ovaitt
- 19629 Serra
- 19630 Janebell
- 19631 Greensleeves
- 19633 Rusjan
- 19637 Presbrey
- 19638 Johngenereid
- 19640 Ethanroth
- 19643 Jacobrucker
- 19652 Saris
- 19656 Simpkins
- 19658 Sloop
- 19660 Danielsteck
- 19662 Stunzi
- 19663 Rykerwatts
- 19664 Yancey
- 19676 Ofeliaguilar
- 19678 Belczyk
- 19679 Gretabetteo
- 19691 Iwate
- 19694 Dunkelman
- 19695 Billnye
- 19700 Teitelbaum
- 19701 Aomori
- 19704 Medlock
- 19707 Tokunai
- 19711 Johnaligawesa
- 19713 Ibaraki
- 19715 Basòdino
- 19718 Albertjarvis
- 19719 Glasser
- 19721 Wray
- 19727 Allen
- 19730 Machiavelli
- 19731 Tochigi
- 19738 Calinger
- 19741 Callahan
- 19754 Paclements
- 19756 Martínezfrías
- 19758 Janelcoulson
- 19762 Lacrowder
- 19763 Klimesh
- 19766 Katiedavis
- 19768 Ellendoane
- 19769 Dolyniuk
- 19774 Diamondback
- 19775 Medmondson
- 19776 Balears
- 19778 Louisgarcia
- 19783 Antoniromanya
- 19787 Betsyglass
- 19788 Hunker
- 19789 Susanjohnson
- 19801 Karenlemmon
- 19806 Domatthews
- 19808 Elainemccall
- 19809 Nancyowen
- 19810 Partridge
- 19811 Kimperkins
- 19813 Ericsands
- 19815 Marshasega
- 19816 Wayneseyfert
- 19817 Larashelton
- 19818 Shotwell
- 19820 Stowers
- 19821 Caroltolin
- 19822 Vonzielonka
- 19826 Patwalker
- 19833 Wickwar
- 19835 Zreda
- 19848 Yeungchuchiu
- 19852 Jamesalbers
- 19853 Ichinomiya
- 19855 Borisalexeev
- 19857 Amandajane
- 19860 Anahtar
- 19861 Auster
- 19872 Chendonghua
- 19873 Chentao
- 19874 Liudongyan
- 19875 Guedes
- 19911 Rigaux
- 19912 Aurapenenta
- 19913 Aigyptios
- 19914 Klagenfurt
- 19915 Bochkarev
- 19916 Donbass
- 19917 Dazaifu
- 19918 Stavby
- 19919 Pogorelov
- 19925 Juni
- 19927 Rogefeldt
- 19952 Ashkinazi
- 19953 Takeo
- 19954 Shigeyoshi
- 19955 Hollý
- 19959 Daisy
- 19962 Martynenko
- 19968 Palazzolascaris
- 19969 Davidfreedman
- 19970 Johannpeter
- 19980 Barrysimon
- 19981 Bialystock
- 19982 Barbaradoore
- 19983 Inagekiyokazu
- 19992 Schönbein
- 19993 Günterseeber
- 19994 Tresini
- 19998 Binoche
- 19999 Depardieu
back to top

== See also ==
- List of minor planet discoverers
- List of observatory codes
- Meanings of minor planet names § Index
