= 12696 Camus =

Carbonaceous background asteroid

Discovery
- Discovered by: E. W. Elst
- Discovery site: La Silla Obs.
- Discovery date: 26 September 1989

Designations
- Named after: Albert Camus (French writer)
- Alternative designations: 1989 SF_{1} · 1993 QL_{2}
- Minor planet category: main-belt · (middle) background

Orbital characteristics
- Epoch 4 September 2017 (JD 2458000.5)
- Uncertainty parameter 0
- Observation arc: 27.59 yr (10,079 days)
- Aphelion: 2.9984 AU
- Perihelion: 2.2463 AU
- Semi-major axis: 2.6224 AU
- Eccentricity: 0.1434
- Orbital period (sidereal): 4.25 yr (1,551 days)
- Mean anomaly: 277.29°
- Mean motion: 0° 13^{m} 55.56^{s} / day
- Inclination: 7.9950°
- Longitude of ascending node: 160.38°
- Argument of perihelion: 128.01°

Physical characteristics
- Mean diameter: 7.71±3.44 km 9.329±0.056 km 11.11 km (calculated)
- Synodic rotation period: 3.78±0.04 h
- Geometric albedo: 0.057 (assumed); 0.069±0.009; 0.130±0.086
- Spectral type: C
- Absolute magnitude (H): 13.4 · 13.5

12696 Camus, provisional designation 1989 SF_{1}, is a carbonaceous background asteroid from the central region of the asteroid belt, approximately 9 kilometers in diameter.

It was discovered on 26 September 1989, by Belgian astronomer Eric Elst at ESO's La Silla Observatory in northern Chile, and named after French Nobel Prize laureate in literature Albert Camus.

== Classification and orbit ==
Camus is a non-family asteroid from the main belt's background population. It orbits the Sun in the central asteroid belt at a distance of 2.2–3.0 AU once every 4 years and 3 months (1,551 days). Its orbit has an eccentricity of 0.14 and an inclination of 8° with respect to the ecliptic. The asteroid's observation arc begins with its discovery, as no precoveries were taken and no identifications were made before 1989.

== Naming ==
This minor planet was named after French philosopher, author, and journalist, Albert Camus (1913–1960), who received the Nobel Prize in Literature in 1957.

Camus is best known for his novels L'Etranger (The Stranger) and La Peste (The Plague). His main interests were justice, ethics, and politics. As a liberal humanist, he was against the doctrines of Christianity as well as Marxism. The approved naming citation was published by the Minor Planet Center on 20 March 2000 (M.P.C. 39658).

== Physical characteristics ==
Camus has been characterized as a carbonaceous C-type asteroid by Pan-STARRS photometric survey.

=== Lightcurves ===
In October 2006, a rotational lightcurve of Camus was obtained from photometric observations by Julian Oey at the Leura Observatory (E17) in Australia. The lightcurve rendered a rotation period of 3.78±0.04 hours with a brightness amplitude of 0.40 in magnitude (U=3-).

=== Diameter and albedo ===
According to NASA's Wide-field Infrared Survey Explorer with its subsequent NEOWISE mission, Camus has an albedo of 0.07 and 0.13 with a corresponding diameter of 9.3 and 7.7 kilometers, respectively. The Collaborative Asteroid Lightcurve Link assumes a standard albedo for carbonaceous asteroids of 0.057 and calculates a larger diameter of 11.1 kilometer with an absolute magnitude of 13.5.
