= 10121 Arzamas =

Main-belt asteroid

Discovery
- Discovered by: E. W. Elst
- Discovery site: CERGA (Caussols Obs.)
- Discovery date: 27 January 1993

Designations
- Named after: Arzamas (Russian city)
- Alternative designations: 1993 BS_{4} · 1994 GA_{11} 2118 T-1
- Minor planet category: main-belt · Themis

Orbital characteristics
- Epoch 4 September 2017 (JD 2458000.5)
- Uncertainty parameter 0
- Observation arc: 46.12 yr (16,844 days)
- Aphelion: 3.6918 AU
- Perihelion: 2.7164 AU
- Semi-major axis: 3.2041 AU
- Eccentricity: 0.1522
- Orbital period (sidereal): 5.74 yr (2,095 days)
- Mean anomaly: 319.65°
- Mean motion: 0° 10^{m} 18.48^{s} / day
- Inclination: 0.8917°
- Longitude of ascending node: 30.729°
- Argument of perihelion: 263.08°

Physical characteristics
- Dimensions: 10.28 km (calculated); 10.757±0.391 km
- Synodic rotation period: 12.1±0.3 h 12.1991±0.0060 h
- Geometric albedo: 0.080±0.024; 0.08 (assumed); 0.0801±0.0237
- Spectral type: C
- Absolute magnitude (H): 13.2 · 13.375±0.003 · 13.4

10121 Arzamas, provisional designation 1993 BS_{4}, is a dark Themistian asteroid from the outer region of the asteroid belt, approximately 10 kilometers in diameter. The asteroid was discovered on 27 January 1993, by Belgian astronomer Eric Elst at Caussols (010) in southeastern France. It was later named after the Russian city of Arzamas.

== Orbit and classification ==
Arzamas is a member of the Themis family, a dynamical family of outer main-belt asteroids with nearly co-planar ecliptical orbits. It orbits the Sun in the outer main-belt at a distance of 2.7–3.7 AU once every 5 years and 9 months (2,095 days). Its orbit has an eccentricity of 0.15 and an inclination of 1° with respect to the ecliptic.

The body's observation arc begins 22 years prior to its official discovery observation, when it was identified as 2118 T-1 at Palomar Observatory during the first Palomar–Leiden Trojan survey in 1971.

== Physical characteristics ==
=== Lightcurves ===
In February 2010, two rotational lightcurves of Arzamas were obtained from photometric observations at the Palomar Transient Factory in California. Lightcurve analysis gave a rotation period of 12.1 and 12.1991 hours with a brightness variation of 0.7 and 0.6 magnitude, respectively (U=2/2).

=== Diameter and albedo ===
According to the NEOWISE mission of NASA's space-based Wide-field Infrared Survey Explorer, Arzamas measures 10.8 kilometer in diameter, and its surface has an albedo of 0.08. The Collaborative Asteroid Lightcurve Link also assumes an albedo of 0.08, characterizes it as a C-type asteroid, and calculates a diameter of 10.3 kilometers with an absolute magnitude of 13.4.

== Naming ==
This minor planet was named after the Russian city of Arzamas, a major transit center on the road from Moscow to the eastern parts of the country. It was founded in 1578 by Ivan the Terrible and is located on the Tyosha River, known for making leather and dyeing fabrics ever since. The official naming citation was published by the Minor Planet Center on 24 November 2007 (M.P.C. 61266).
