= 10988 Feinstein =

Asteroid

Discovery
- Discovered by: Félix Aguilar Obs.
- Discovery site: Félix Aguilar Obs.
- Discovery date: 28 July 1968

Designations
- Named after: Alejandro Feinstein (Argentine astronomer)
- Alternative designations: 1968 OL · 1992 NH
- Minor planet category: main-belt · Phocaea background

Orbital characteristics
- Epoch 4 September 2017 (JD 2458000.5)
- Uncertainty parameter 0
- Observation arc: 48.27 yr (17,630 days)
- Aphelion: 2.8707 AU
- Perihelion: 1.6887 AU
- Semi-major axis: 2.2797 AU
- Eccentricity: 0.2592
- Orbital period (sidereal): 3.44 yr (1,257 days)
- Mean anomaly: 136.20°
- Mean motion: 0° 17^{m} 10.68^{s} / day
- Inclination: 24.043°
- Longitude of ascending node: 117.60°
- Argument of perihelion: 127.38°

Physical characteristics
- Dimensions: 3.43 km (calculated)
- Synodic rotation period: 2.6723±0.0005 h (Note: Pravec (2016) web: lightcurve plot of (10988) Feinstein. Rotation period 2.6723±0.0005 hours with a brightness amplitude of 0.11±0.01 mag. Quality Code: 3-. Source data from the Ondrejov Asteroid Photometry Project. Summary figures at Collaborative Asteroid Lightcurve Link (CALL))
- Geometric albedo: 0.23 (assumed)
- Spectral type: S
- Absolute magnitude (H): 14.09±0.16 · 14.3 · 14.54 · 14.65±0.23

10988 Feinstein (provisional designation 1968 OL) is a stony Phocaea asteroid from the inner regions of the asteroid belt. Approximately 3.4 kilometers in diameter, it was discovered on 28 July 1968 by astronomers at the Félix Aguilar Observatory in El Leoncito, Argentina. The asteroid was named after Argentine astronomer Alejandro Feinstein in 2008.

== Orbit and classification ==
Dynamically, Feinstein is a member of the Phocaea family (701), a large inner-belt asteroid family of stony composition. However, no membership to any known family could be found when using the Hierarchical Clustering Method.

Feinstein orbits the Sun in the inner main-belt at a distance of 1.7–2.9 AU once every 3 years and 5 months (1,257 days). Its orbit has an eccentricity of 0.26 and an inclination of 24° with respect to the ecliptic. The body's observation arc begins at El Leoncito with its official discovery observation in 1968.

== Physical characteristics ==
Feinstein has been characterized as a common stony S-type asteroid by PanSTARRS photometric survey, which agrees with the family's overall spectral type.

=== Rotation period ===
In May 2016, a rotational lightcurve of Feinstein was obtained from photometric observations by Czech astronomer Petr Pravec at Ondřejov Observatory. Lightcurve analysis gave a short rotation period of 2.6723 hours with a brightness amplitude of 0.11 magnitude (U=3-).

=== Diameter and albedo ===
The Collaborative Asteroid Lightcurve Link assumes an albedo of 0.23 – derived from 25 Phocaea, the Phocaea family's largest member and namesake – and calculates a mean-diameter of 3.43 kilometers based on an absolute magnitude of 14.54.

== Naming ==
This minor planet was named after Argentinian astronomer Alejandro Feinstein (born 1928) at La Plata Astronomical Observatory in La Plata, and one of the co-founders of the Argentinian Astronomical Association (Spanish: Asociación Argentina de Astronomía). The official naming citation was published by the Minor Planet Center on 20 May 2008 (M.P.C. 62929).
