= 12148 Caravaggio =

Main-belt asteroid

- 12148 Caravaggio (circled) imaged next to a background star

Discovery
- Discovered by: C. J. van Houten, I. van Houten-Groeneveld, and Tom Gehrels
- Discovery site: Palomar Observatory
- Discovery date: September 24, 1960

Designations
- Named after: Caravaggio
- Alternative designations: 1990 WS_{12}, 6636 P-L
- Minor planet category: Main belt

Orbital characteristics
- Epoch November 21, 2025 (JD 2461000.5)
- Observation arc: 65.548 yr
- Aphelion: 2.934 AU
- Perihelion: 2.835 AU
- Semi-major axis: 2.885 AU
- Eccentricity: 0.017
- Orbital period (sidereal): 1789.725 d (4.9 yr)
- Mean anomaly: 312.579°
- Mean motion: 0° 12^{m} 4.25124^{s} / day
- Inclination: 3.774°
- Longitude of ascending node: 116.03°
- Argument of perihelion: 45.311°
- Known satellites: 1

Physical characteristics
- Mean diameter: 8.75 km
- Mean density: 1.3 g/cm^{3}
- Absolute magnitude (H): 14.22

12148 Caravaggio (provisional designation 1990 WS_{12}) is a binary main-belt asteroid discovered in 1990 by C. J. van Houten, I. van Houten-Groeneveld, and T. Gehrels, and was identified as a binary in 2026 by J.-F. Gout, D. Herald, D. Gault, C. Weber, and B. Anderson. It was discovered during the Palomar–Leiden survey at the Palomar Observatory.

== Naming ==
On Nov 28, 2010, the asteroid was named after Michelangelo Merisi da Caravaggio (1571–1610), an important Italian painter during the Renaissance. He was forgotted after his death, but his importance was rediscovered because of his influence on the Baroque style.

== Satellite ==
On January 27, 2026, a stellar occultation observed from Starkville, Mississippi revealed a companion to this system, and was announced on April 6, 2026. As of July 2026, this companion is unnamed.

This companion is about 1.85 km in diameter, and orbits Caravaggio in 8.3 days, with an estimated separation of 73.9 km.
