= 19848 Yeungchuchiu =

Main-belt asteroid

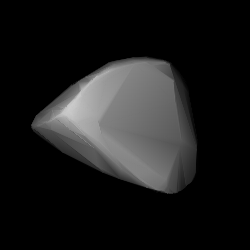
- Yeungchuchiu modeled from its lightcurve

Discovery
- Discovered by: W. K. Yeung
- Discovery site: Desert Beaver Obs.
- Discovery date: 2 October 2000

Designations
- Named after: Chu Chiu Yeung (discoverer's father)
- Alternative designations: 2000 TR · 1998 KR_{38} 1999 SY_{6}
- Minor planet category: main-belt · Eos

Orbital characteristics
- Epoch 4 September 2017 (JD 2458000.5)
- Uncertainty parameter 0
- Observation arc: 34.82 yr (12,718 days)
- Aphelion: 3.2372 AU
- Perihelion: 2.7768 AU
- Semi-major axis: 3.0070 AU
- Eccentricity: 0.0766
- Orbital period (sidereal): 5.21 yr (1,905 days)
- Mean anomaly: 94.290°
- Mean motion: 0° 11^{m} 20.4^{s} / day
- Inclination: 11.061°
- Longitude of ascending node: 54.759°
- Argument of perihelion: 350.16°

Physical characteristics
- Mean diameter: 11.69±0.55 km 12.700±0.134; 12.90 km (calculated); 13.242±0.282 km
- Synodic rotation period: 3.450±0.002 h 3.4508±0.0003 h
- Geometric albedo: 0.14 (assumed); 0.170±0.020; 0.2107±0.0250
- Spectral type: S
- Absolute magnitude (H): 12.2 · 11.7 · 12.227±0.002 (R) · 12.49±0.28

19848 Yeungchuchiu (provisional designation 2000 TR) is a stony Eos asteroid from the outer region of the asteroid belt, approximately 12 kilometers (7.5 miles) in diameter. It was discovered on 2 October 2000 by Canadian amateur astronomer William Yeung at the Desert Beaver Observatory in Arizona, United States. It is the largest object found by the discoverer, just 1°.2 west of Jupiter, who named it after his father, Chu Chiu Yeung.

== Orbit and classification ==
Yeungchuchiu is a member of the Eos family, an orbital group of more than 4,000 asteroids, which are known for mostly being of stony composition. It orbits the Sun in the outer main-belt at a distance of 2.8–3.2 AU once every 5 years and 3 months (1,905 days). Its orbit has an eccentricity of 0.08 and an inclination of 11° with respect to the ecliptic. The first precovery was taken at the Australian Siding Spring Observatory in 1982, extending the asteroid's observation arc by 18 years prior to its discovery.

== Naming ==
This minor planet was named by the discoverer after his father, Chu Chiu Yeung (born 1925), in gratitude for his unconditional support. The approved naming citation was published by the Minor Planet Center on 9 March 2001 (M.P.C. 42368).

== Physical characteristics ==
=== Rotation period ===
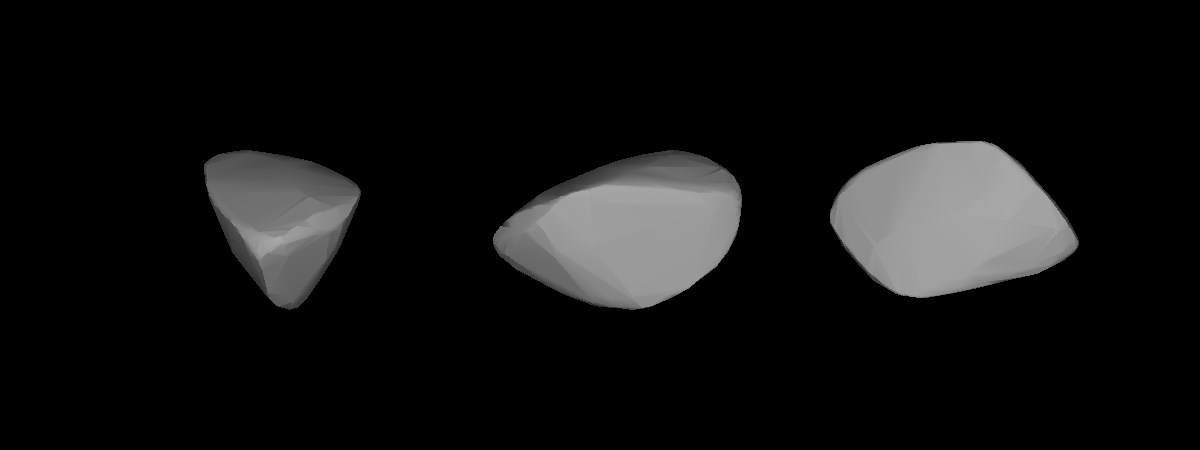
Lightcurve based 3D-model of Yeungchuchiu

In November 2005, a rotational lightcurve of Yeungchuchiu was obtained from photometric observations by the discoverer at the Desert Eagle Observatory in Arizona. Lightcurve analysis gave a well-defined rotation period of 3.450 hours with a brightness variation of 0.70 magnitude (U=3). The large amplitude suggests that the body is of non-spherical shape and that the long axis is almost twice as long as the short axis. It is likely that the rotational axis was almost perpendicular to the observation's line-of-sight. A second lightcurve was obtained at the Palomar Transient Factory in September 2010, and gave a concurring period of 3.4508±0.0003 hours with an amplitude of 0.63 in magnitude (U=2).

=== Diameter and albedo ===
According to the survey carried out by NASA's Wide-field Infrared Survey Explorer and its subsequent NEOWISE mission, the asteroid measures 11.7 and 13.2 kilometers in diameter with an albedo for its surface of 0.17 and 0.21, respectively. The Collaborative Asteroid Lightcurve Link assumes an albedo for stony asteroids of 0.21 and calculates a diameter of 12.9 kilometers with an absolute magnitude of 12.2.
