= Meanings of minor-planet names: 17001–18000 =

As minor planet discoveries are confirmed, they are given a permanent number by the IAU's Minor Planet Center (MPC), and the discoverers can then submit names for them, following the IAU's naming conventions. The list below concerns those minor planets in the specified number-range that have received names, and explains the meanings of those names.

Official naming citations of newly named small Solar System bodies are approved and published in a bulletin by IAU's Working Group for Small Bodies Nomenclature (WGSBN). Before May 2021, citations were published in MPC's Minor Planet Circulars for many decades. Recent citations can also be found on the JPL Small-Body Database (SBDB). Until his death in 2016, German astronomer Lutz D. Schmadel compiled these citations into the Dictionary of Minor Planet Names (DMP) and regularly updated the collection.

Based on Paul Herget's The Names of the Minor Planets, Schmadel also researched the unclear origin of numerous asteroids, most of which had been named prior to World War II. This article incorporates text from this source, which is in the public domain: SBDB New namings may only be added to this list below after official publication as the preannouncement of names is condemned. The WGSBN publishes a comprehensive guideline for the naming rules of non-cometary small Solar System bodies.

== 17001–17100 ==
Named minor planet	Provisional	This minor planet was named for...	Ref · Catalog
17001 Braydennoh	1999 CT_{54}	Brayden Noh, ISEF awardee in 2019	IAU · 17001
17002 Kouzel	1999 CV_{54}	Ivan U. Kouzel, ISEF awardee in 2003	JPL · 17002
17003 Poojanpandya	1999 CE_{55}	Poojan Pandaya, ISEF awardee in 2019 and recipient of the European Union Contest for Young Scientists award	IAU · 17003
17004 Sinkevich	1999 CR_{61}	Maksim M. Sinkevich, ISEF awardee in 2003	JPL · 17004
17008 Anamariaperez	1999 CL_{65}	AnaMaria Perez, ISEF awardee in 2019	IAU · 17008
17009 Jasonping	1999 CM_{70}	Jason Ping, ISEF awardee in 2019	IAU · 17009
17014 Melaniequan	1999 CY_{96}	Melanie Quan, ISEF awardee in 2019	IAU · 17014
17015 Shriyareddy	1999 CN_{117}	Shriya Reddy, ISEF awardee in 2019	IAU · 17015
17019 Aldo	1999 DV_{3}	Aldo Tombelli (1921–2001), Italian amateur astronomer and father of co-discoverer Maura Tombelli	JPL · 17019
17020 Hopemeraengus	1999 DH_{4}	Hope, Merope and Aengus, children of British discoverer Ian P. Griffin	JPL · 17020
17022 Huisjen	1999 DN_{7}	Martin A. Huisjen (born 1944), American space scientist	JPL · 17022
17023 Abbott	1999 EG	Bud Abbott (1897–1974), American vaudeville performer and film actor	MPC · 17023
17024 Costello	1999 EJ_{5}	Lou Costello (1906–1959), American actor, producer and comedian	MPC · 17024
17025 Pilachowski	1999 ES_{5}	Catherine Anderson Pilachowski (born 1949), American astrophysicist at NOAO	MPC · 17025
17028 Frankstadermann	1999 FJ_{5}	Frank J. Stadermann (1962–2010), a German-American scientist.	IAU · 17028
17029 Cuillandre	1999 FM_{6}	Jean-Charles Cuillandre (born 1968), French astronomer	MPC · 17029
17030 Sierks	1999 FC_{9}	Holger Sierks (born 1960), German physicist	JPL · 17030
17031 Piethut	1999 FL_{9}	Piet Hut (born 1952), Dutch astrophysicist	MPC · 17031
17032 Edlu	1999 FM_{9}	Edward Tsang Lu (born 1963), a physicist specializing in solar physics.	JPL · 17032
17033 Rusty	1999 FR_{9}	Rusty Schweickart (born 1935), American astronaut and pilot of the Apollo 9 lunar module	JPL · 17033
17034 Vasylshev	1999 FS_{9}	Vasyl Shevchenko (born 1960), Ukrainian astronomer	JPL · 17034
17035 Velichko	1999 FC_{10}	Fedor P. Velichko (1957–2013), Ukrainian astronomer, and director of Chuguev Observing Station	JPL · 17035
17036 Krugly	1999 FD_{10}	Yurij N. Krugly (born 1962), Ukrainian astronomer	JPL · 17036
17037 Danfleisch	1999 FV_{10}	Dan Fleisch (born 1951), American astronomer and Emeritus Professor of Physics at Wittenberg University	IAU · 17037
17038 Wake	1999 FO_{21}	Nancy Wake (1912–2011), New Zealand journalist and British Special Operations Executive agent during WWII	JPL · 17038
17039 Yeuseyenka	1999 FN_{26}	Yauhen A. Yeuseyenka, ISEF awardee in 2003	JPL · 17039
17040 Almeida	1999 FT_{27}	Liliane de Almeida, ISEF awardee in 2003	JPL · 17040
17041 Castagna	1999 FB_{30}	Pedro Turibeo Castagna, ISEF awardee in 2003	JPL · 17041
17042 Madiraju	1999 FG_{30}	Anila Madiraju, ISEF awardee in 2003, and IFAA recipient	JPL · 17042
17043 Santucci	1999 FJ_{30}	Giovanni Santucci, ISEF awardee in 2019	IAU · 17043
17044 Mubdirahman	1999 FZ_{30}	Mubdi Rahman, ISEF awardee in 2003	JPL · 17044
17045 Markert	1999 FV_{32}	Thomas Henry Markert (1948–1996), an American astronomer who made some of the first x-ray observations of binary star systems, supernova remnants, suspected black holes and local group galaxies. He helped develop much of the instrumentation used on major x-ray observatories, including Einstein's FPCS and Chandra's HETG spectrometers.	JPL · 17045
17046 Kenway	1999 FM_{33}	Gaetan Kristian Kenway, ISEF awardee in 2003	JPL · 17046
17047 Tateschrock	1999 FP_{33}	Tate Schrock, ISEF awardee in 2019	IAU · 17047
17048 Nicolesegaran	1999 FD_{34}	Nicole Segaran, ISEF awardee in 2019	IAU · 17048
17049 Miron	1999 FJ_{34}	Rachelle Elizabeth Miron, ISEF awardee in 2003	JPL · 17049
17050 Weiskopf	1999 FX_{45}	Lydia Suzanne Weiskopf, ISEF awardee in 2003	JPL · 17050
17051 Oflynn	1999 FW_{46}	Colin Patrick O'Flynn, ISEF awardee in 2003	JPL · 17051
17052 Senthilvel	1999 FS_{51}	Pranav Senthilvel, ISEF awardee in 2019	IAU · 17052
17053 Ashayshah	1999 FX_{56}	Ashay Shah, ISEF awardee in 2019	IAU · 17053
17056 Boschetti	1999 GW_{3}	Carla Boschetti (born 1969), Italian astronomer of the University of Padua who studied the Seyfert galaxies	MPC · 17056
17058 Rocknroll	1999 GA_{5}	Rock and Roll music †	MPC · 17058
17059 Elvis	1999 GX_{5}	Elvis Presley (1935–1977), American Rock and Roll singer †	MPC · 17059
17060 Mikecombi	1999 GX_{7}	Michael R. Combi (born 1952), American astrophysicist	JPL · 17060
17061 Tegler	1999 GQ_{8}	Stephen C. Tegler (born 1962), American astronomer	JPL · 17061
17062 Bardot	1999 GR_{8}	Brigitte Bardot (born 1934), French actress and spokesperson for animal rights	JPL · 17062
17063 Papaloizou	1999 GP_{9}	John Papaloizou (born 1947), British astrophysicist	JPL · 17063
17064 Ashnashah	1999 GX_{16}	Ashna Shah, ISEF awardee in 2019	IAU · 17064
17065 Shrilashah	1999 GK_{17}	Shrila Shah, ISEF awardee in 2019	IAU · 17065
17066 Ginagallant	1999 GG_{18}	Gina May Gallant, ISEF awardee in 2003	JPL · 17066
17069 Adyantshankar	1999 GD_{20}	Adyant Shankar, ISEF awardee in 2019	IAU · 17069
17070 Yanniksingh	1999 GG_{20}	Yannik Singh, ISEF awardee in 2019	IAU · 17070
17071 Spiride	1999 GK_{21}	Andrei Spiride, ISEF awardee in 2019	IAU · 17071
17072 Athiviraham	1999 GT_{31}	Anand Athiviraham, ISEF awardee in 2003	JPL · 17072
17073 Alexblank	1999 GX_{34}	Alexander Edmund Blank, ISEF awardee in 2003	JPL · 17073
17074 Shreshth	1999 GQ_{36}	Shreshth Srivastava, ISEF awardee in 2019	IAU · 17074
17075 Pankonin	1999 GF_{49}	Vernon Pankonin (born 1946), American radio astronomer	JPL · 17075
17076 Betti	1999 HO	Enrico Betti (1823–1892), Italian mathematician, known for the topology of hyperspaces and Betti's theorem	JPL · 17076
17077 Pampaloni	1999 HY_{2}	Carlo Pampaloni (born 1958), Italian amateur astronomer	MPC · 17077
17078 Sellers	1999 HD_{3}	Peter Sellers (1925–1980), English film actor, comedian and singer	MPC · 17078
17079 Lavrovsky	1999 HD_{9}	Vladislav Igorevich Lavrovsky, ISEF awardee in 2003	JPL · 17079
17081 Jaytee	1999 JT_{1}	Joseph T. Williams (born 1936), American engineer at the Multiple-Mirror Observatory on Mt. Hopkins, Arizona ("J. T." also appears in the provisional designation)	JPL · 17081
17084 Sundararajan	1999 JV_{14}	Suvin Sundararajian, ISEF awardee in 2019	IAU · 17084
17086 Ruima	1999 JH_{18}	Rui Ma, ISEF awardee in 2003	JPL · 17086
17088 Giupalazzolo	1999 JF_{19}	Giuseppe William Palazzolo, ISEF awardee in 2003	JPL · 17088
17089 Mercado	1999 JU_{19}	Jose Mercado, ISEF awardee in 2003	JPL · 17089
17090 Mundaca	1999 JE_{21}	Sebastian Mundaca, ISEF awardee in 2003	JPL · 17090
17091 Senthalir	1999 JM_{21}	P. Senthalir, ISEF awardee in 2003	JPL · 17091
17092 Sharanya	1999 JP_{21}	S. Sharanya, ISEF awardee in 2003	JPL · 17092
17093 Supanklang	1999 JH_{22}	Saijai Supanklang, ISEF awardee in 2019	IAU · 17093
17094 Sarahsyed	1999 JV_{25}	Sarah Syed, ISEF awardee in 2019	IAU · 17094
17095 Mahadik	1999 JN_{26}	Bhushan Prakash Mahadik, ISEF awardee in 2003	JPL · 17095
17096 Takemaru	1999 JX_{26}	Leo Takemaru, ISEF awardee in 2019	IAU · 17096
17097 Ronneuman	1999 JX_{31}	Ron Neuman, ISEF awardee in 2003	JPL · 17097
17098 Ikedamai	1999 JE_{34}	Mai Ikeda, ISEF awardee in 2003	JPL · 17098
17099 Emilytianshi	1999 JE_{37}	Emily Tianshi, ISEF awardee in 2019	IAU · 17099
17100 Kamiokanatsu	1999 JT_{37}	Natsumi Kamioka, ISEF awardee in 2003	JPL · 17100

== 17101–17200 ==
back to top

Named minor planet	Provisional	This minor planet was named for...	Ref · Catalog
17101 Sakenova	1999 JZ_{38}	Saule Sakenova, ISEF awardee in 2003	JPL · 17101
17102 Begzhigitova	1999 JB_{41}	Akmaral Begzhigitova, ISEF awardee in 2003	JPL · 17102
17103 Kadyrsizova	1999 JC_{42}	Zhibek Kadyrsizova, ISEF awardee in 2003	JPL · 17103
17104 McCloskey	1999 JV_{46}	Mairead Mary McCloskey, ISEF awardee in 2003	JPL · 17104
17106 Tidball	1999 JT_{48}	Nathan Tidball, ISEF awardee in 2019	IAU · 17106
17108 Patricorbett	1999 JL_{51}	Patrick Kieran Corbett, ISEF awardee in 2003	JPL · 17108
17115 Justiniano	1999 JT_{54}	Miguel Angel Justiniano Lajara, ISEF awardee in 2003	JPL · 17115
17119 Alexisrodrz	1999 JP_{59}	Alexis Rodriguez, ISEF awardee in 2003	JPL · 17119
17121 Fernandonido	1999 JX_{60}	Fernando Javier Nido, ISEF awardee in 2003	JPL · 17121
17124 Rishavalera	1999 JC_{65}	Risha Valera, ISEF awardee in 2019	IAU · 17124
17125 Vijayakumar	1999 JB_{68}	Vivek Vijayakumar, ISEF awardee in 2019	IAU · 17125
17126 Sophiawang	1999 JH_{68}	Sophia Wang, ISEF awardee in 2019	IAU · 17126
17127 Ryanwestcott	1999 JE_{69}	Ryan Westcott, ISEF awardee in 2019	IAU · 17127
17128 Stephyoshida	1999 JS_{75}	Stephanie Yoshida, ISEF awardee in 2019	IAU · 17128
17130 Alexzhang	1999 JV_{79}	Alex Zhang, ISEF awardee in 2019	IAU · 17130
17131 Paulazhu	1999 JL_{80}	Paula Zhu, ISEF awardee in 2019	IAU · 17131
17138 Burgosrosario	1999 JM_{84}	Miamar Gloria Burgos-Rosario (b. 2002) was awarded first place in the 2019 Intel International Science and Engineering Fair for her microbiology team project. She attended the Hayfield Secondary School, Alexandria, Virginia, U.S.A.	IAU · 17138
17139 Malyshev	1999 JS_{86}	Denis Alexandrovich Malyshev, ISEF awardee in 2003	JPL · 17139
17140 Yangkevin	1999 JU_{86}	Kevin Yang, Regeneron Science Talent Search finalist in 2020	IAU · 17140
17141 Bhatia	1999 JV_{94}	Jagdeep Bhatia, Regeneron Science Talent Search finalist in 2020	IAU · 17141
17143 Andrewbrinton	1999 JN_{97}	Andrew Brinton, Regeneron Science Talent Search finalist in 2020	IAU · 17143
17144 Laurenchen	1999 JW_{98}	Lauren Chen, Regeneron Science Talent Search finalist in 2020	IAU · 17144
17145 Hollycheng	1999 JG_{99}	Holly Cheng, Regeneron Science Talent Search finalist in 2020	IAU · 17145
17147 Mariafields	1999 JF_{102}	Maria Fields, Regeneron Science Talent Search finalist in 2020	IAU · 17147
17148 Arifirester	1999 JJ_{105}	Ari Firester, Regeneron Science Talent Search finalist in 2020	IAU · 17148
17149 Victoriagraf	1999 JM_{105}	Victoria Graf, Regeneron Science Talent Search finalist in 2020	IAU · 17149
17151 Zanderhill	1999 JB_{114}	Zander Hill, Regeneron Science Talent Search finalist in 2020	IAU · 17151
17156 Kennethseitz	1999 KS_{3}	Kenneth Seitz (born 1941) long-time director of Cantilena, a women's chorale in Arlington, Massachusetts	JPL · 17156
17160 Jetly	1999 LT_{10}	Anushka Jetly, Regeneron Science Talent Search finalist in 2020	IAU · 17160
17162 Nithinkavi	1999 LX_{13}	Nithin Kavi, Regeneron Science Talent Search finalist in 2020	IAU · 17162
17163 Vasifedoseev	1999 LT_{19}	Vasiliy G. Fedoseev, ISEF awardee in 2003	JPL · 17163
17166 Secombe	1999 MC	Harry Secombe (1921–2001), Welsh comedian and singer	MPC · 17166
17167 Olgarozanova	1999 NB	Olga Rozanova (1886–1918), a Russian painter, illustrator and designer, who was a member of the avant-garde group Supremus, led by Cubo-Futurist Kazimir Malevich.	IAU · 17167
17169 Tatarinov	1999 NQ_{23}	Andrew S. Tatarinov, ISEF awardee in 2003	JPL · 17169
17170 Vsevustinov	1999 NS_{25}	Vsevolod D. Ustinov, ISEF awardee in 2003	JPL · 17170
17173 Evgenyamosov	1999 RN_{10}	Evgeny A. Amosov, ISEF awardee in 2003	JPL · 17173
17174 Krivitsky	1999 RX_{53}	Violetta Krivitsky, Regeneron Science Talent Search finalist in 2020	IAU · 17174
17176 Viktorov	1999 SH_{17}	Artem G. Viktorov, ISEF awardee in 2003	JPL · 17176
17178 Caitlinrita	1999 TK_{218}	Caitlin Rita Kunchur, Regeneron Science Talent Search finalist in 2020	IAU · 17178
17179 Codina	1999 TC_{224}	Sayd Jose Codina Landaberry (born 1926), Uruguayan-Brazilian astronomer and director of the Rio de Janeiro Observatory (880)	JPL · 17179
17180 Rupertli	1999 TS_{291}	Rupert Li, Regeneron Science Talent Search finalist in 2020	IAU · 17180
17184 Carlrogers	1999 VL_{22}	Carl Ransom Rogers (1902–1987), American psychologist	MPC · 17184
17185 Mcdavid	1999 VU_{23}	David McDavid (born 1950), American astronomer	MPC · 17185
17186 Sergivanov	1999 VP_{28}	Sergey O. Ivanov, ISEF awardee in 2003	JPL · 17186
17190 Retopezzoli	1999 WY_{8}	Reto Pezzoli (born 1959), Swiss amateur astronomer and friend of the discoverer Stefano Sposetti	MPC · 17190
17192 Loharu	1999 XL_{172}	Evgeniy E. Loharu, ISEF awardee in 2003	MPC · 17192
17193 Alexeybaran	1999 XC_{205}	Alexey V. Baran, ISEF awardee in 2003	JPL · 17193
17195 Jimrichardson	1999 XQ_{234}	James Richardson (born 1961), American astronomer	JPL · 17195
17196 Mastrodemos	1999 XW_{234}	Nickolaos Mastrodemos (born 1964), astronomer	JPL · 17196
17197 Matjazbone	2000 AC_{12}	Matjaz Bone, ISEF awardee in 2003	JPL · 17197
17198 Gorjup	2000 AA_{31}	Niko Gorjup, ISEF awardee in 2003	JPL · 17198
17199 Jasonliu	2000 AT_{40}	Jason Liu, Regeneron Science Talent Search finalist in 2020	IAU · 17199

== 17201–17300 ==
back to top

Named minor planet	Provisional	This minor planet was named for...	Ref · Catalog
17201 Matjazhumar	2000 AJ_{58}	Matjaz Humar, ISEF awardee in 2003	JPL · 17201
17205 McCreery	2000 AM_{105}	Kyra McCreery, Regeneron Science Talent Search finalist in 2020	IAU · 17205
17208 Pokrovska	2000 AH_{130}	Tzveta Dmitrieva Pokrovska, ISEF awardee in 2003	JPL · 17208
17210 Nadinemeister	2000 AY_{172}	Nadine Meister, Regeneron Science Talent Search finalist in 2020	IAU · 17210
17211 Brianfisher	2000 AY_{174}	Brian Lee Fisher, ISEF awardee in 2003	JPL · 17211
17214 Neervannan	2000 AR_{189}	Arjun Neervannan, Regeneron Science Talent Search finalist in 2020	IAU · 17214
17215 Slivan	2000 AG_{238}	Stephen Slivan (born 1962), American astronomer who demonstrated a preferential spin-vector alignment among Koronis family members. Known as "Slivan states", the discovery has led to a new understanding of thermal radiation forces on small bodies.	JPL · 17215
17216 Scottstuart	2000 AK_{243}	Joseph Scott Stuart (born 1971), American astronomer	JPL · 17216
17217 Pollner	2000 AR_{243}	Alina Pollner, Regeneron Science Talent Search finalist in 2020	IAU · 17217
17218 Stgeorge	2000 BV_{16}	Katherine St. George (b. 2002) was a finalist in the 2020 Regeneron Science Talent Search, a science competition for high school seniors, for her animal sciences project. She attended the John F. Kennedy High School, Bellmore, New York.	IAU · 17218
17219 Gianninoto	2000 CV	Joe Gianninoto (born 1947), an avid amateur astronomer originally from New York, now living in Tucson, Arizona.	JPL · 17219
17220 Johnpenna	2000 CX_{26}	John Penna, mentor at the ISTS in 2002	JPL · 17220
17222 Perlmutter	2000 CU_{44}	Frances Perlmutter, mentor at the ISTS in 2002	JPL · 17222
17224 Randoross	2000 CP_{58}	Randolph Ross, mentor at the ISTS in 2002	JPL · 17224
17225 Alanschorn	2000 CS_{60}	Alan Schorn, mentor at the ISTS in 2002	JPL · 17225
17226 Anaiahbre	2000 CC_{76}	Anaiah Bre Thomas, Regeneron Science Talent Search finalist in 2020	IAU · 17226
17228 Adrianeliz	2000 CJ_{94}	Adriane Elizabeth Thompson, Regeneron Science Talent Search finalist in 2020	IAU · 17228
17231 Rohanwagh	2000 CB_{122}	Rohan Wagh, Regeneron Science Talent Search finalist in 2020	IAU · 17231
17233 Stanshapiro	2000 DU_{58}	Stan Shapiro, mentor at the ISTS in 2002	JPL · 17233
17235 Ellawesson	2000 EC_{29}	Ella Wesson, Regeneron Science Talent Search finalist in 2020	IAU · 17235
17236 Westover	2000 EK_{45}	Alek M. Westover, Regeneron Science Talent Search finalist in 2020	IAU · 17236
17238 Brianwu	2000 EP_{56}	Brian Y. Wu, Regeneron Science Talent Search finalist in 2020	IAU · 17238
17240 Gletorrence	2000 EK_{95}	Glenda Torrence, mentor at the ISTS in 2002	JPL · 17240
17241 Wooden	2000 EM_{126}	Diane H. Wooden (born 1958), American astronomer	JPL · 17241
17242 Leslieyoung	2000 EX_{130}	Leslie A. Young (born 1965), American astronomer	JPL · 17242
17245 Yixie	2000 GS_{42}	Yi Xie, Regeneron Science Talent Search finalist in 2020	IAU · 17245
17246 Christophedumas	2000 GL_{74}	Christophe Dumas (born 1968), a planetary scientist who is an expert in spectral and adaptive optics observations of asteroids and planets.	JPL · 17246
17247 Vanverst	2000 GG_{105}	Mary VanVerst, mentor at the ISTS in 2002	JPL · 17247
17248 Ellieyang	2000 GC_{107}	Ellie Yang, Regeneron Science Talent Search finalist in 2020	IAU · 17248
17249 Eliotyoung	2000 GM_{110}	Eliot F. Young (born 1962), American astronomer	JPL · 17249
17250 Genelucas	2000 GW_{122}	Gene A. Lucas (born 1946), American amateur astronomer	MPC · 17250
17251 Vondracek	2000 GA_{127}	Mark Vondracek, mentor at the ISTS in 2002	JPL · 17251
17253 VonSecker	2000 GW_{136}	Claire VonSecker, mentor at the ISTS in 2002	JPL · 17253
17257 Strazzulla	2000 HM_{25}	Giovanni Strazzulla (born 1951), Italian astrophysicist	JPL · 17257
17258 Whalen	2000 HK_{90}	Patrice Whalen, mentor at the ISTS in 2002	JPL · 17258
17260 Kušnirák	2000 JQ_{58}	Peter Kušnirák (born 1974), a prolific asteroid photometrist who has worked at Ondřejov since 1999.	JPL · 17260
17262 Winokur	2000 JS_{62}	Bruce Winokur, mentor at the ISTS in 2002	JPL · 17262
17265 Debennett	2000 JP_{83}	David Edwyn Bennett, ISEF awardee in 2003 and European Union Contest for Young Scientists Award recipient.	JPL · 17265
17268 Yasonik	2000 KZ_{50}	Jake Yasonik, Regeneron Science Talent Search finalist in 2020	IAU · 17268
17269 Dicksmith	2000 LN_{1}	Dick Smith, Australian entrepreneur	MPC · 17269
17270 Nolthenius	2000 LB_{2}	Richard Nolthenius (born 1952) is a Californian astronomer with publications on subjects as diverse as dark matter, galaxies, black holes, asteroids and climate change. A well-known teacher, he developed and runs Cabrillo College's observatory and astronomy program, and is a prolific observer of occultations in his spare time.	IAU · 17270
17273 Karnik	2000 LD_{13}	Ryna Karnik, ISTS awardee in 2004, and ISEF awardee in 2003	JPL · 17273
17277 Jarrydlevine	2000 LP_{25}	Jarryd Brandon Levine, ISEF awardee in 2003	JPL · 17277
17278 Viggh	2000 LK_{27}	Herbert E. M. Viggh (born 1963), American astronomer	JPL · 17278
17279 Jeniferevans	2000 LX_{27}	Jenifer B. Evans (born 1964), American astronomer	JPL · 17279
17280 Shelly	2000 LK_{28}	Frank C. Shelly (born 1960), American astronomer	JPL · 17280
17281 Mattblythe	2000 LV_{28}	Matthew S. Blythe (born 1960), American astronomer	JPL · 17281
17283 Ustinov	2000 MB_{1}	Peter Ustinov (1921–2004), English actor, writer and filmmaker	MPC · 17283
17285 Bezout	2000 NU	Étienne Bézout (1739–1783), French mathematician	MPC · 17285
17286 Bisei	2000 NB_{6}	Bisei, Japanese town where the discovering Bisei Spaceguard Center is located	MPC · 17286

== 17301–17400 ==
back to top

Named minor planet	Provisional	This minor planet was named for...	Ref · Catalog
17305 Caniff	4652 P-L	Milton Caniff (1907–1988), American cartoonist who created the comic strips Terry and the Pirates and Steve Canyon. His attention to detail gained him the title "the Rembrandt of Comics". The name was suggested by F. N. Bowman, who found the identification involving this minor planet.	JPL · 17305
17314 Aisakos	1024 T-1	Aesacus, Trojan prince in Greek mythology who was the son of Priam and Arisbe. Aisakos was a seer – as had also been his maternal grandfather, Merops – and said that Hecuba's future son would bring disaster to Troy.	MPC · 17314
17351 Pheidippos	1973 SV	Pheidippos was a hero from Nisyros, in the Kalydnian islands. Son of king Thessalos, brother of Antiphos and grandson of Heracles, he fought against Telephos, king of Mysia	JPL · 17351
17354 Matrosov	1977 EU_{1}	Vladimir Mefodievich Matrosov (born 1932), Russian physicist	MPC · 17354
17356 Vityazev	1978 PG_{4}	Veniamin Vladimirovich Vityazev (born 1943), Russian astronomer and professor at Saint Petersburg University	MPC · 17356
17357 Lucataliano	1978 QH_{3}	Luca Taliano (1999–2012) was a dear friend of the discoverer (Giovanni de Sanctis, Vincenzo Zappalà).	JPL · 17357
17358 Lozino-Lozinskij	1978 SU_{4}	Gleb Eugenievich Lozino-Lozinskij (1909–2001), Russian engineer and designer of the MiG-105 EPOS orbital airplane and the Buran spaceplane	MPC · 17358
17365 Thymbraeus	1978 VF_{11}	Thymbraeus was one of the two sons of Laocoön who was killed by sea serpents sent to punish the father for attempting to warn the Trojans about the danger of the wooden horse left by the Greeks. The scene is immortalized in an ancient sculpture, the Gruppo del Laocoonte on display in the Vatican.	IAU · 17365
17368 Korn	1979 QV_{1}	Andreas Korn (born 1972) is an astronomer at Uppsala University involved in outreach activities	JPL · 17368
17369 Eremeeva	1979 QR_{2}	Alina Iosifovna Eremeeva (born 1929) is a historian of science who works at Moscow University's Sternberg Observatory.	JPL · 17369
17399 Andysanto	1983 RL	Andrew G. Santo (born 1961), an American spacecraft engineer at the Applied Physics Laboratory of Johns Hopkins University. His diligent work as Spacecraft System Engineer throughout the development, launch and operations phases ensured the success of NEAR Shoemaker, NASA's initial "faster, better, cheaper" Discovery mission.	JPL · 17399

== 17401–17500 ==
back to top

Named minor planet	Provisional	This minor planet was named for...	Ref · Catalog
17402 Valeryshuvalov	1985 UF	Valery Shuvalov (born 1952), the laboratory head at the Institute for Dynamics of Geospheres of the Russian Academy of Sciences in Moscow.	JPL · 17402
17403 Masciarelli	1986 EL_{5}	Clodoveo Masciarelli (born 1955), a doctor, artist and amateur astronomer.	JPL · 17403
17407 Teige	1987 TG	Karel Teige (1900–1952) was a graphic artist, leader and theoretician of the Czech art avantgarde. He served as a main Czech connection to French Surrealism, especially to Andre Breton. He was a co-founder of The Group of Surrealists in Czechoslovakia in 1934	JPL · 17407
17408 McAdams	1987 UZ_{1}	Jim V. McAdams (born 1961) optimizes spacecraft trajectories at the Applied Physics Laboratory of Johns Hopkins University. He designed trajectories for the NEAR Shoemaker mission from the formative phase of NASA's Discovery Program in 1989 to landing on (433) Eros in 2001.	JPL · 17408
17410 Zitarrosa	1988 CQ_{4}	Alfredo Zitarrosa (1936-1989), Uruguayan singer-songwriter, poet, and social justice advocate	IAU · 17410
17412 Kroll	1988 KV	Reinhold Kroll, of the Instituto de Astrofisica de Canarias, is known for his research on magnetic, chemically peculiar stars, particularly infrared observations of them. He was a fellow student of the discoverer at the University of Göttingen.	JPL · 17412
17415 Czesławlang	1988 RO_{10}	Czesław Lang, one of the most famous Polish road-racing cyclists and a prominent promoter of cycling in Poland.	IAU · 17415
17427 Poe	1989 CQ_{2}	Edgar Allan Poe, 19th-century American author, master of the macabre and the mysterious	JPL · 17427
17428 Charleroi	1989 DL	Charleroi, metropolis of Wallonia	JPL · 17428
17429 Ianhowarth	1989 GD_{1}	Ian Howarth (born 1954), British astronomer, served as Senior Secretary and Vice President of the Royal Astronomical Society	IAU · 17429
17431 Sainte-Colombe	1989 RT	Jean de Sainte-Colombe (1640–1700), a French composer and celebrated viola da gamba player, added a seventh string on the bass viol. A teacher of Marin Marais, he wrote more than 60 concertos for two viols and more than 170 pieces for the seven-string viol	JPL · 17431
17435 di Giovanni	1989 SP_{3}	Alessio di Giovanni, Sicilian poet †	MPC · 17435
17437 Stekene	1989 SC_{4}	Stekene is a town in East-Flanders. Its church has a tower from the thirteenth century.	JPL · 17437
17438 Quasimodo	1989 SQ_{4}	Salvatore Quasimodo (1901–1968), an Italian novelist and poet, won the Nobel Prize for Literature in 1959. One of the foremost poets of the 20th century, he devoted himself to the translation of the Gospel of John, some of Catullus' cantos and several episodes from the Odyssey.	JPL · 17438
17439 Juliesan	1989 TR_{3}	Julie Nelissen (1985–2017) was a dedicated nurse working at the Department of Psychiatry at the Stuivenberg clinic in the Antwerp region.	JPL · 17439
17445 Avatcha	1989 YC_{5}	Avacha Bay, southeastern Kamchatka, used by Vitus Bering as a base during the expeditions that resulted in the discovery of Alaska, and where the French astronomer Louis Delisle de la Croyère is buried	JPL · 17445
17446 Mopaku	1990 BC_{2}	The name Mopaku honors three assistants involved with the observations of minor planets at Kavular: Venkatachala Moorthy, Arvind Paranjpye and Kamatchiappan Kuppuswamy	JPL · 17446
17447 Heindl	1990 HE	Clifford Heindl, deputy manager of JPL's Space and Earth Science Division 32 †	MPC · 17447
17452 Amurreka	1990 QE_{10}	The Amour river in Russia flows across northern Asia from the mountains of northeastern China to the Sea of Okhotsk. With a length of 4444 km, the Amurreka drains diverse landscapes of desert, steppe, tundra and taiga. The river forms the border between the Russian Far East and northeastern China	JPL · 17452
17458 Dick	1990 TP_{7}	Wolfgang R. Dick, German astronomer and geodesist.	JPL · 17458
17459 Andreashofer	1990 TJ_{8}	Innkeeper Andreas Hofer (1767–1810) headed the Tyrolese popular rising against French occupation and was executed by a firing squad on order of Napoleon. His patriotic and heroic engagement is the subject of numerous dramatic plays, stories and poems, notably by Rosegger, Eichendorff and Koerner.	JPL · 17459
17460 Mang	1990 TC_{11}	Herbert Mang (born 1942), professor of material sciences at the Vienna University of Technology.	JPL · 17460
17461 Shigosenger	1990 UD_{1}	Shigosenger is a team of original characters introduced by Akashi Municipal Planetarium to promote astronomy education for children. The Planetarium is situated on the Japan Standard Time Meridian and "Shigosen" is a Japanese term for the meridian.	JPL · 17461
17462 Takahisa	1990 UP_{1}	Takahisa Morita (born 1933) is a Japanese amateur astronomer who regularly opens his personal telescope to the public. He is particularly skilled at sunspot and prominence photography, and his images often grace the pages of Japanese astronomical magazines	JPL · 17462
17465 Inawashiroko	1990 VU_{3}	Inawashiroko, one of the largest lakes in Japan, is located in Bandai-Asahi National Park. It is known for the clarity of its water, migrating swans and numerous swimming beaches. The town of Inawashiro on the north shore is the birthplace of bacteriologist Hideyo Noguchi	JPL · 17465
17466 Vargasllosa	1990 VL_{4}	Mario Vargas Llosa (born 1936), a Peruvian writer.	JPL · 17466
17470 Mitsuhashi	1991 BX	Yasuhiko Mitsuhashi, an amateur astronomer as well as a medical practitioner in Takamatsu City.	JPL · 17470
17472 Dinah	1991 FY	Dinah, Alice's cat in Lewis Carroll's Alice's Adventures in Wonderland.	JPL · 17472
17473 Freddiemercury	1991 FM_{3}	Freddie Mercury, British songwriter and lead singer for rock group Queen.	JPL · 17473
17484 Ganghofer	1991 RY_{4}	Ludwig Ganghofer, German writer.	JPL · 17484
17486 Hodler	1991 RB_{41}	Ferdinand Hodler (1853–1918) founded modern Swiss painting with his use of allegorical themes, historical events, sights of the Alps, lakes and portraits. His monumental 1907–1908 mural Marching out of the Jenense students in the war of liberation in 1813 adorns the aula of Jena University.	JPL · 17486
17488 Mantl	1991 TQ_{6}	Wolfgang Mantl (born 1939), professor of jurisprudence and constitutional law at the University of Graz.	JPL · 17488
17489 Trenker	1991 TS_{6}	Luis Trenker (1892–1990), initially a herdsman, mountain guide and ski instructor in his South Tyrolese.	JPL · 17489
17492 Hippasos	1991 XG_{1}	Hippasus, one of Priam's many sons. He supported Aeneas in the Trojan war.	JPL · 17492
17493 Wildcat	1991 YA	University of Arizona sports teams (basketball, football, etc.) †	MPC · 17493
17494 Antaviana	1992 AM_{3}	Antaviana is a word created by the writer Pere Calders. It was suggested by students in honor of their school Antaviana, located at Barcelona, Spain, as a symbol of solidarity, responsibility, freedom and hope	JPL · 17494
17496 Augustinus	1992 DM_{2}	Aurelius Augustinus (354–430), born in North Africa, converted to Christianity in Milan and was bishop of the antique town Hippo from 395.	JPL · 17496

== 17501–17600 ==
back to top

Named minor planet	Provisional	This minor planet was named for...	Ref · Catalog
17501 Tetsuro	1992 FG	Since retiring as principal of a junior high school "child astronomy club" sponsored by Kuroishi city, Tetsuro Fukushi (born 1936) has worked as a volunteer lecturer. Since 1998 he has worked to further the spread of astronomical activities for local citizens as vice president of the Kuroishi Subaru Association	JPL · 17501
17502 Manabeseiji	1992 FD_{1}	Seiji Manabe (born 1947) was a project manager of the VLBI Exploration of Radio Astronomy, which led to the high-precision determination of trigonometric parallaxes for Galactic radio sources. He served as head of the Earth Rotation Division at the National Observatory of Japan and as director of Mizusawa Observatory	JPL · 17502
17503 Celestechild	1992 FK_{1}	Celeste Ann Child, daughter of Jack and Maren Child, in recognition of her achievements in school, friendships and family, and her commitment to tolerance and compassion.	JPL · 17503
17506 Walschap	1992 GW_{4}	Gerard Walschap (1898–1989), a Flemish writer and poet.	JPL · 17506
17508 Takumadan	1992 JH	Takuma Dan, Japanese businessman †	MPC · 17508
17509 Ikumadan	1992 JR	Ikuma Dan, Japanese composer †	MPC · 17509
17516 Kogayukihito	1992 UZ_{6}	Yukihito Koga (born 1959), the executive announcer at the broadcasting station in Fukuoka, is also very well known as an amateur astronomer and as an astronomical anchorperson in Kyushu. His main interests are comets, meteors, solar eclipses and deep-space observations	JPL · 17516
17518 Redqueen	1992 YD	The Red Queen, character in Lewis Carroll's Through the Looking-Glass. Alice has some very strange experiences and conversations with her.	JPL · 17518
17519 Pritsak	1992 YE_{2}	Omeljan Pritsak, Ukrainian-American cofounder of the Ukrainian Research Institute at Harvard University	JPL · 17519
17520 Hisayukiyoshio	1993 BX_{2}	Yoshio Hisayuki (born 1942) founded the Ube astronomy club in Ube City, Yamaguchi Prefecture, Japan in 1968. He was the president of the club during 1968–1974 and again from 2006 to the present. Since 2006, he has served also as the director of the Ube Municipal Planetarium.	JPL · 17520
17521 Kiek	1993 BR_{4}	Israël David Kiek, 19th-century Dutch photographer	JPL · 17521
17543 Sosva	1993 PA_{3}	Sosva river, in western Siberia, a tributary of the Ob	JPL · 17543
17544 Kojiroishikawa	1993 RF_{2}	Kojiro Ishikawa (born 1947), a Japanese amateur astronomer.	JPL · 17544
17546 Osadakentaro	1993 SB_{2}	Kentaro Osada (born 1958), a Japanese amateur astronomer.	JPL · 17546
17547 Nestebovelli	1993 SN_{2}	Neste Bovelli (1913–2015) was a professor of humanities, and passionate about literature, art and history. She was an active president of various cultural associations, and promoted and published many issues about art and the history of the city of Terni.	JPL · 17547
17555 Kenkennedy	1993 VC_{5}	Kenneth Kennedy (born 1942) has been an active amateur astronomer in Scotland for fifty years. A retired senior hematologist, he has been Director of the BAA Aurora Section and has encouraged amateur collaboration in professional studies of aurora and polar mesospheric clouds	JPL · 17555
17556 Pierofrancesca	1993 WB	Piero della Francesca (1416–1492) was an Italian Renaissance painter.	JPL · 17556
17563 Tsuneyoshi	1994 CC_{1}	Tsuneyoshi Fujii, Japanese director of the Sunshine Planetarium in Tokyo, and earlier lecturer and curator at the Gotoh Planetarium and Astronomical Museum, also in Tokyo	JPL · 17563
17567 Hoshinoyakata	1994 GP	Hoshi-no-Yakata is a public astronomical observatory in Kasuga city, Fukuoka, Japan.	JPL · 17567
17579 Lewkopelew	1994 TQ_{16}	Lev Kopelev (Лев Копелев, German spelling Lew Kopelew), Russian author and dissident, recipient of the Peace Prize of the Association of the German Book Trade	JPL · 17579
17597 Stefanzweig	1995 EK_{8}	Stefan Zweig, 19th–20th-century Austrian biographer, essayist and writer	JPL · 17597
17600 Dobřichovice	1995 SO	Dobřichovice, Czech municipality in Central Bohemia, the Czech Republic †	MPC · 17600

== 17601–17700 ==
back to top

Named minor planet	Provisional	This minor planet was named for...	Ref · Catalog
17601 Sheldonschafer	1995 SS	Sheldon Schafer, professor of astronomy at Bradley University, and director emeritus of the Lakeside Planetarium in Peoria, Illinois. He built the world's largest scale model of the Solar System.	MPC · 17601
17602 Dr. G.	1995 SO_{1}	Stephen Gottesman ("Dr. G.", born 1939), American radio astronomer at the University of Florida	JPL · 17602
17603 Qoyllurwasi	1995 SG_{5}	Qoyllurwasi means "house of stars" in the Incan language, Quechua. The name was chosen to commemorate the fifth anniversary of the "Mutsumi Ishitsuka" National Planetarium of the Geophysical Institute of Peru.	JPL · 17603
17606 Wumengchao	1995 ST_{53}	Wu Mengchao (1922–2021), academician of the Chinese Academy of Sciences, was an expert and pioneer on hepatosurgery. He established a unique system of liver surgery of China and led the development of hepatosurgery internationally. He won the China State Supreme Science and Technology Award in 2005	JPL · 17606
17607 Táborsko	1995 TC	Táborsko, Czech South Bohemian district, at the centre of which is Tábor †	MPC · 17607
17608 Terezín	1995 TN	Terezín (Theresienstadt) was established as a walled fortress and garrison town by Habsburgs in 1780.	JPL · 17608
17610 Riggsbee	1995 UJ_{1}	Gayle H. Riggsbee (born 1932), former machine-design engineer, promoting astronomy for more than 60 years in North and South Carolina.	JPL · 17610
17611 Jožkakubík	1995 UP_{2}	Jožka Kubík III, Slovak gypsy musician †	MPC · 17611
17612 Whiteknight	1995 UW_{6}	The White Knight, character in Lewis Carroll's Through the Looking-Glass and what Alice found there. He often falls off his horse. He and the Red Knight fight to decide whose prisoner Alice shall be	JPL · 17612
17614 Mariamartínez	1995 UT_{7}	Maria Martínez, Spanish mathematician and historian at the Polytechnic University of Valencia.	IAU · 17614
17615 Takeomasaru	1995 UZ_{8}	Masaru Takeo (born 1947), one of the most well-known amateur astronomers in Ehime prefecture.	JPL · 17615
17617 Takimotoikuo	1995 UD_{45}	Ikuo Takimoto (born 1954) became interested in astronomy after seeing a photograph of Comet Ikeya–Seki. He now photographs sunspots and solar prominences, in both white light and H-®, at the private observatory he completed in 1988.	JPL · 17617
17625 Joseflada	1996 AY_{1}	Josef Lada, Czech painter †	MPC · 17625
17627 Humptydumpty	1996 BM_{3}	Humpty-Dumpty, character in a Mother Goose rhyme, whose head and body together are egg-shaped. He is not only the subject of one of the most famous nursery rhymes in English but also a major character in Lewis Carroll's Alice's Adventures in Wonderland. He tells Alice a lot about the meaning of words, including the strange ones in the poem "Jabberwocky".	JPL · 17627
17629 Koichisuzuki	1996 HN_{1}	Koichi Suzuki (born 1955) became a member of the Nanyo Astronomy Lovers Club in 1993 and actively and eagerly spreads astronomical knowledge	JPL · 17629
17637 Blaschke	1996 PA_{1}	Wilhelm Blaschke (1885–1962) was an Austro-Hungarian mathematician and instrumental in establishing the University of Hamburg as an important center of mathematical research. His own research centered on differential and integral geometry and kinematics, and he laid the foundations of topological differential geometry.	JPL · 17637
17638 Sualan	1996 PB_{1}	Sue and Alan French, American amateur astronomers †	MPC · 17638
17640 Mount Stromlo	1996 PA_{7}	Mount Stromlo Observatory †	MPC · 17640
17645 Inarimori	1996 TR_{14}	The Inarimori ancient burial mound is located in the south of Nanyo city, Yamagata prefecture. It has a square front and a circular main part, constructed in the latter part of the fourth century. It was the tomb of a chief in the ancient Okitama province (southern part of Yamagata prefecture)	JPL · 17645
17649 Brunorossi	1996 UP_{1}	Bruno Rossi (1905–1993) was a physicist who worked on the Manhattan Project and was a pioneer of X-ray astronomy.	JPL · 17649
17651 Tajimi	1996 VM_{1}	Tajimi, the city in Gifu prefecture where the first discoverer lives and where this minor planet was discovered. JPL	MPC · 17651
17652 Nepoti	1996 VQ_{1}	Giuliano Nepoti (born 1949), an enthusiastic amateur astronomer, is a dear friend of the discoverer.	JPL · 17652
17653 Bochner	1996 VM_{2}	Salomon Bochner, Polish-American mathematician †	MPC · 17653
17656 Hayabusa	1996 VL_{4}	The minor-planet explorer, Hayabusa (MUSES-C) was developed by JAXA/ISAS and launched in 2003. It traveled to (25143) Itokawa to capture samples of surface material. After overcoming many critical difficulties, Hayabusa finally returned to the earth in 2010, with fragments of surface material.	JPL · 17656
17657 Himawari	1996 VO_{4}	Himawari, which means "sunflower", is the name of a series of Japanese weather satellites. Himawari-1 was launched in 1977, and the latest, Himawari-7, was launched in 2006	JPL · 17657
17670 Liddell	1996 XQ_{19}	Alice Pleasance Liddell (1852–1934) was a young English girl, then aged 10, and Lewis Carroll's inspiration for the heroine of Alice's Adventures in Wonderland. The name was suggested by J. Meeus.	JPL · 17670
17673 Houkidaisen	1996 XL_{32}	Houki Daisen, the highest peak in the Chugoku district of Tottori prefecture.	JPL · 17673
17681 Tweedledum	1997 AQ_{6}	Tweedledum, character in Lewis Carroll's Through the Looking-Glass. When Alice meets him, he is standing under a tree with his arm round his brother's neck. Like his twin Tweedledee, he gives his name to a minor planet of Hungaria type.	JPL · 17681
17683 Kanagawa	1997 AR_{16}	Kanagawa prefecture, where Hadano Observatory is situated †	MPC · 17683
17693 Wangdaheng	1997 CP_{28}	Wang Daheng (1915–2011), research professor, director and honorary director of Changchun Institute of Optics and Fine Mechanics, is one of the founders of optical science and technology in China	JPL · 17693
17694 Jiránek	1997 ET_{1}	Vladimír Jiránek, Czech cartoonist † ‡	MPC · 17694
17696 Bombelli	1997 EH_{8}	Rafael Bombelli (1526–1572), Italian mathematician of Bologna, known for his treatise on algebra introduced a consistent procedure for handling imaginary complex numbers, removing some of the mystery from the so-called irreducible case of the solution of the cubic equation.	JPL · 17696
17697 Evanchen	1997 EQ_{41}	Evan Matthew Chen (born 1993), ISTS awardee in 2012	JPL · 17697
17698 Racheldavis	1997 EW_{42}	Rachel Michelle Davis (born 1993), ISTS awardee in 2012	JPL · 17698
17700 Oleksiygolubov	1997 GM_{40}	Oleksiy Golubov (born 1985) has changed our understanding of the YORP effect via his theory of Tangential YORP, which helps explain the measured spin evolution of asteroids. His current work has identified several new equilibrium states for binaries, leading to important new predictions for how these bodies dynamically evolve.	JPL · 17700

== 17701–17800 ==
back to top

Named minor planet	Provisional	This minor planet was named for...	Ref · Catalog
17702 Kryštofharant	1997 JD	Kryštof Harant (1564–1621), Czech nobleman, soldier, writer and composer	MPC · 17702
17703 Bombieri	1997 RS_{5}	Enrico Bombieri (born 1940), an Italian mathematician	JPL · 17703
17712 Fatherwilliam	1997 WK_{7}	Father William, character in Lewis Carroll's Alice's Adventures in Wonderland.	JPL · 17712
17720 Manuboccuni	1997 XH_{10}	Emanuele Boccuni (born 1969), Italian composer of new age music	JPL · 17720
17734 Boole	1998 BW_{3}	George Boole, English mathematician and philosopher.	JPL · 17734
17736 Zhifeiyu	1998 BA_{12}	Zhifei Yu (b. 2002), a finalist in the 2020 Regeneron Science Talent Search, a science competition for high school seniors, for her space science project. She attended the Phillips Academy, Andover, Massachusetts.	IAU · 17736
17737 Sigmundjähn	1998 BF_{14}	Sigmund Jähn (1937–2019), the first German cosmonaut	JPL · 17737
17744 Jodiefoster	1998 BZ_{31}	Jodie Foster, American actress and director.	JPL · 17744
17746 Haigha	1998 BU_{41}	Haigha, character in Lewis Carroll's Through the Looking-Glass.	JPL · 17746
17748 Uedashoji	1998 CL	Ueda Shoji (1913–2000), a professional Japanese photographer	JPL · 17748
17749 Dulbecco	1998 DW_{1}	Renato Dulbecco (1914–2012) was an Italian-American virologist who won the 1975 Nobel Prize in Physiology or Medicine for his discoveries concerning the interaction between tumor viruses and the genetic material of the cell.	IAU · 17749
17759 Hatta	1998 DA_{24}	Hatta, one of the king's two messengers, one to fetch and one to carry, in Lewis Carroll's Through the Looking-Glass	JPL · 17759
17764 Schatzman	1998 ES_{1}	Evry Schatzman (1920–2010), a French astrophysicist	JPL · 17764
17768 Tigerlily	1998 EO_{8}	the Tiger-Lily, one of the Live Flowers in Lewis Carroll's Through the Looking-Glass.	JPL · 17768
17770 Baumé	1998 EU_{11}	Antoine Baumé (1728–1804), a French chemist	JPL · 17770
17771 Elsheimer	1998 EA_{13}	Adam Elsheimer (1578–1610), a German painter	JPL · 17771
17776 Troska	1998 FF_{3}	Jan Matzal Troska (1881–1961), Czech science-fiction author	MPC · 17776
17777 Ornicar	1998 FV_{9}	In elementary school French children often learn the sequence mais ou et donc or ni car, which are the conjunctions that link phrases.	JPL · 17777
17779 Migomueller	1998 FK_{12}	Michael "Migo" Mueller (born 1974), German physicist and infrared minor planet astronomer	JPL · 17779
17781 Kepping	1998 FH_{23}	Ashley Deane Kepping, ISEF awardee in 2003	JPL · 17781
17782 Paulbailey	1998 FD_{26}	Paul Bailey mentored a finalist in the 2020 Regeneron Science Talent Search, a science competition for high school seniors. He teaches at the BASIS Scottsdale, Scottsdale, Arizona.	IAU · 17782
17783 Scottbrunner	1998 FO_{29}	Scott Brunner mentored a finalist in the 2020 Regeneron Science Talent Search, a science competition for high school seniors. He teaches at the University Liggett School, Grosse Pointe Woods, Michigan.	IAU · 17783
17784 Banerjee	1998 FF_{30}	Sudeep Banerjee, ISEF awardee in 2003	JPL · 17784
17785 Wesleyfuller	1998 FX_{35}	Wesley Ryan Fuller, ISEF awardee in 2003, and MILSET Expo-Sciences International Award recipient	JPL · 17785
17789 Carolcarty	1998 FJ_{49}	Carol Carty mentored a finalist in the 2020 Regeneron Science Talent Search, a science competition for high school seniors. She teaches at the Watchung Hills Regional High School, Warren, New Jersey.	IAU · 17789
17792 Kathconnelly	1998 FR_{56}	Kathleen Connelly mentored a finalist in the 2020 Regeneron Science Talent Search, a science competition for high school seniors. She teaches at the Homestead High School, Mequon, Wisconsin.	IAU · 17792
17793 Delorio	1998 FO_{58}	Benjamin DeLorio mentored a finalist in the 2020 Regeneron Science Talent Search, a science competition for high school seniors. He teaches at the Belmont High School, Belmont, Massachusetts.	IAU · 17793
17794 Kowalinski	1998 FC_{60}	Blair Elisabeth Kowalinski, ISEF awardee in 2003, and MILSET Expo-Sciences International Award recipient	JPL · 17794
17795 Elysiasegal	1998 FJ_{61}	Elysia Segal (born 1985), ISEF awardee in 2003	JPL · 17795
17797 Philfrankel	1998 FO_{62}	Philip Frankel mentored a finalist in the 2020 Regeneron Science Talent Search, a science competition for high school seniors. He teaches at the Hunter College High School, New York, New York.	IAU · 17797
17799 Petewilliams	1998 FC_{64}	Peter McLane Williams, ISEF awardee in 2003	JPL · 17799

== 17801–17900 ==
back to top

Named minor planet	Provisional	This minor planet was named for...	Ref · Catalog
17801 Zelkowitz	1998 FH_{69}	Rachel Lauren Zelkowitz, ISEF awardee in 2003	JPL · 17801
17803 Barish	1998 FD_{71}	Robert David Barish, ISEF awardee in 2003	JPL · 17803
17805 Švestka	1998 FV_{72}	Zdeněk Švestka (1925–2013), Czech astronomer, expert on solar physics, and editor of the journal Solar Physics.	MPC · 17805
17806 Adolfborn	1998 FO_{73}	Adolf Born (1930–2016), Czech painter and illustrator, caricaturist and film-maker	MPC · 17806
17807 Ericpearce	1998 FT_{74}	Eric C. Pearce (born 1961), site manager for the Lincoln Near-Earth Asteroid Research (LINEAR) at the Lincoln Laboratory's Experimental Test Site near Socorro, New Mexico	JPL · 17807
17810 Brittholden	1998 FM_{100}	Brittany Holden mentored a finalist in the 2020 Regeneron Science Talent Search, a science competition for high school seniors. She teaches at the Dutch Fork High School, Irmo, South Carolina.	IAU · 17810
17813 Alisonhuenger	1998 FL_{109}	Alison Huenger mentored a finalist in the 2020 Regeneron Science Talent Search, a science competition for high school seniors. She teaches at the Manhasset High School, Manhasset, New York.	IAU · 17813
17815 Kulawik	1998 FM_{113}	Christopher Eric Kulawik, ISEF awardee in 2003	JPL · 17815
17821 Bölsche	1998 FC_{127}	Wilhelm Bölsche (1861–1939), German naturalist, poet and writer (Src)	MPC · 17821
17822 Tonireland	1998 FM_{135}	Toni Ireland mentored a finalist in the 2020 Regeneron Science Talent Search, a science competition for high school seniors. She teaches at the Centennial High School, Ellicott City, Maryland.	IAU · 17822
17823 Bartels	1998 GA	Mel Bartels (born 1954), American amateur astronomer and open source software developer for altazimuth telescopes (Src)	MPC · 17823
17825 Juranitch	1998 GQ_{8}	Robert Juranitch mentored a finalist in the 2020 Regeneron Science Talent Search, a science competition for high school seniors. He teaches at the University School of Milwaukee, Milwaukee, Wisconsin.	IAU · 17825
17826 Normanwisdom	1998 GK_{10}	Sir Norman Wisdom (1915–2010), English comedian, singer and actor, best known for his smash hit films of the 1950s as the downtrodden, accident-prone little man in the shrunken suit and skewhiff cap. A physical comedian, Wisdom did his trademark trip-up on the red carpet after being knighted by the Queen.	JPL · 17826
17830 Andreajurgens	1998 HR_{35}	Andrea Jurgens mentored a finalist in the 2020 Regeneron Science Talent Search, a science competition for high school seniors. She teaches at the Dutch Fork High School, Irmo, South Carolina.	IAU · 17830
17831 Ussery	1998 HW_{35}	Robert Francis Ussery, ISEF awardee in 2003	JPL · 17831
17832 Pitman	1998 HV_{39}	Ellen Marie Pitman, ISEF awardee in 2003	JPL · 17832
17835 Anoelsuri	1998 HS_{46}	A. Noel Suri, ISEF awardee in 2003	JPL · 17835
17836 Canup	1998 HT_{50}	Robin Canup (born 1968), American astronomer	JPL · 17836
17841 Karenlucci	1998 HZ_{96}	Karen Lucci mentored a finalist in the 2020 Regeneron Science Talent Search, a science competition for high school seniors. She teaches at the Hopewell Valley Central High School, Pennington, New Jersey.	IAU · 17841
17842 Jorgegarcia	1998 HN_{98}	Felix Javier Jorge-Garcia, ISEF awardee in 2003	JPL · 17842
17843 Shaelucero	1998 HD_{99}	Shae Lucero mentored a finalist in the 2020 Regeneron Science Talent Search, a science competition for high school seniors. She teaches at the Valencia High School, Los Lunas, New Mexico.	IAU · 17843
17844 Judson	1998 HM_{100}	Michael Ivan Judson, ISEF awardee in 2003	JPL · 17844
17848 Mordechai	1998 HR_{133}	Molly Mordechai mentored a finalist in the 2020 Regeneron Science Talent Search, a science competition for high school seniors. She teaches at the North Shore High School, Glen Head, New York.	IAU · 17848
17851 Kaler	1998 JK	James B. Kaler, American astronomer and author †	MPC · 17851
17853 Ronaldsayer	1998 JK_{3}	Ronald W. Sayer (born 1967), American data analyst for the Lincoln Near-Earth Asteroid Research program	JPL · 17853
17855 Geffert	1998 KK	Martin Geffert (1922–2015), German amateur astronomer at Starkenburg Observatory	MPC · 17855
17856 Gomes	1998 KL_{1}	Rodney Gomes da Silva (born 1954), astronomer	JPL · 17856
17857 Hsieh	1998 KR_{1}	Henry H. Hsieh (born 1978), American astronomer who studied 7968 Elst-Pizarro and other comet-like asteroid of the asteroid belt	JPL · 17857
17858 Beaugé	1998 KS_{3}	Cristián Beaugé (born 1963), Argentinian astronomer	JPL · 17858
17859 Galinaryabova	1998 KC_{4}	Galina O. Ryabova (born 1955), Russian astronomer	JPL · 17859
17860 Roig	1998 KQ_{4}	Fernando Roig (born 1968), astronomer and dynamicist at the National Observatory in Brazil. He is known for his results on the depletion of the asteroid belt's Hecuba gap and his HCM analysis of Jupiter trojans.	JPL · 17860
17865 Odden	1998 KS_{39}	Caroline Odden mentored a finalist in the 2020 Regeneron Science Talent Search, a science competition for high school seniors. She teaches at the Phillips Academy, Andover, Massachusetts	IAU · 17865
17869 Descamps	1998 MA_{14}	Pascal Descamps (born 1961), a French astronomer who works at the "Institut de mécanique céleste et de calcul des éphémérides" in Paris on the modeling the Galilean satellites of Jupiter, with particular application to observations of their mutual phenomena. He has also studied the volcanoes on the satellite Io and has worked on the Uranian system using adaptive optics.	JPL · 17869
17870 Pannett	1998 QU_{92}	Todd Pannett mentored a finalist in the 2020 Regeneron Science Talent Search, a science competition for high school seniors. He teaches at the Parkway Central High School, Chesterfield, Missouri.	IAU · 17870
17873 Palaciosdeborao	1998 XO_{96}	Gonzalo Palacios de Borao, Spanish Jesuit priest.	IAU · 17873
17879 Robutel	1999 BA_{14}	Philippe Robutel (born 1964), a French astronomer who works at the "Institut de mécanique céleste et de calcul des éphémérides" in Paris on the stability of the three-body problem, especially on the existence of quasiperiodic motions for the application of KAM theory.	JPL · 17879
17880 Vanessaparker	1999 BA_{24}	Vanessa Parker mentored a finalist in the 2020 Regeneron Science Talent Search, a science competition for high school seniors. She teaches at the Friendswood High School, Friendswood, Texas.	IAU · 17880
17881 Radmall	1999 CA_{51}	Nelson Bret Radmall, ISEF awardee in 2003	JPL · 17881
17882 Thielemann	1999 CX_{87}	John Seth Thielemann, ISEF awardee in 2003	JPL · 17882
17883 Scobuchanan	1999 CP_{105}	Scott Sheldon Buchanan, ISEF awardee in 2003	JPL · 17883
17884 Jeffthompson	1999 CD_{116}	Jeff Thompson, ISEF awardee in 2003	JPL · 17884
17885 Brianbeyt	1999 CF_{118}	Brian James Beyt, ISEF awardee in 2003	JPL · 17885
17886 Ramazan	1999 CH_{118}	Birant Ramazan mentored a finalist in the 2020 Regeneron Science Talent Search, a science competition for high school seniors. He teaches at the Davidson Academy of Nevada, Reno, Nevada.	IAU · 17886
17889 Liechty	1999 DH_{3}	Anthony David Liechty, ISEF awardee in 2003	JPL · 17889
17891 Buraliforti	1999 EA	Cesare Burali-Forti (1861–1931), an Italian mathematician who taught at the Military Academy in Turin. He discovered a paradox in Cantor's set theory: since the ordinal number of a set of ordinals is greater than the ordinal of each set element, "the ordinal of the set of all ordinals" is a self-contradictory concept.	JPL · 17891
17892 Morecambewise	1999 EO_{5}	Morecambe and Wise, British comic double act Eric Morecambe (1926–1984) and Ernie Wise (1925–1999) teamed up in the 1940s to create Britain's finest stage double act and later became TV favorites. Eric, `the one with the glasses', was known for his witty retorts, giving slaps to the cheeks of Ernie for plays `what he wrote'.	JPL · 17892
17893 Arlot	1999 FO	Jean-Eudes Arlot (born 1948), a French astronomer and current director of the "Institut de mécanique céleste et de calcul des éphémérides" in Paris and chair of the IAU Commission 20 working group on satellites. He has worked on a theory of the motions of Jupiter's Galilean satellites and organised international campaigns to observe the mutual phenomena of these bodies.	JPL · 17893
17897 Gallardo	1999 FV_{8}	Tabaré Gallardo (born 1962), Uruguayan astronomer and dynamicist	JPL · 17897
17898 Scottsheppard	1999 FB_{19}	Scott S. Sheppard (born 1977), American astronomer and discoverer of minor planets	JPL · 17898
17899 Mariacristina	1999 FD_{19}	Maria Cristina De Sanctis (born 1967), Italian astronomer	JPL · 17899
17900 Leiferman	1999 FO_{24}	Adam James Leiferman, ISEF awardee in 2003	JPL · 17900

== 17901–18000 ==
back to top

Named minor planet	Provisional	This minor planet was named for...	Ref · Catalog
17901 Korinriske	1999 FT_{25}	Korin Riske mentored a finalist in the 2020 Regeneron Science Talent Search, a science competition for high school seniors. She teaches at the Sunset High School, Portland, Oregon.	IAU · 17901
17902 Britbaker	1999 FM_{26}	Brittany Baker, ISEF awardee in 2003	JPL · 17902
17903 Shamieh	1999 FS_{27}	Lara Shamieh mentored a finalist in the 2020 Regeneron Science Talent Search, a science competition for high school seniors. She teaches at the Jesuit High School, Portland, Oregon.	IAU · 17903
17904 Annekoupal	1999 FW_{30}	Anne Elizabeth Koupal, ISEF awardee in 2003	JPL · 17904
17905 Kabtamu	1999 FM_{31}	Mahlet Kabtamu, ISEF awardee in 2003	JPL · 17905
17906 Shapovalov	1999 FG_{32}	Vladimir Shapovalov mentored a finalist in the 2020 Regeneron Science Talent Search, a science competition for high school seniors. He teaches at the Bronx High School of Science, Bronx, New York.	IAU · 17906
17907 Danielgude	1999 FQ_{33}	Daniel Moises Gude, ISEF awardee in 2003	JPL · 17907
17908 Chriskuyu	1999 FL_{34}	Christopher Ku Yu, ISEF awardee in 2003	JPL · 17908
17909 Nikhilshukla	1999 FC_{35}	Nikhil Atul Shukla, ISEF awardee in 2003	JPL · 17909
17910 Munyan	1999 FG_{37}	Benjamin Kendrick Munyan, ISEF awardee in 2003	JPL · 17910
17911 Robertsnyder	1999 FF_{41}	Robert Snyder mentored a finalist in the 2020 Regeneron Science Talent Search, a science competition for high school seniors. He teaches at the Munster High School, Munster, Indiana.	IAU · 17911
17913 Strode	1999 FT_{52}	Paul Strode mentored a finalist in the 2020 Regeneron Science Talent Search, a science competition for high school seniors. He teaches at the Fairview High School, Boulder, Colorado.	IAU · 17913
17914 Joannelee	1999 FA_{54}	Joanne June Lee, ISEF awardee in 2003	JPL · 17914
17917 Cartan	1999 GN_{5}	Élie Cartan (1869–1951), a French mathematician whose major contribution is the development of the theory of exterior differential forms, which he applied to the study of Lie groups, differential geometry and systems of differential equations.	JPL · 17917
17919 Licandro	1999 GC_{8}	Javier Licandro (born 1966), an Uruguayan astronomer at the Isaac Newton Telescope at the Roque de los Muchachos Observatory on La Palma, who works on the physical properties of minor bodies and trans-Neptunian objects.	JPL · 17919
17920 Zarnecki	1999 GE_{9}	John Zarnecki (born 1949), a British astronomer of the Open University, Milton Keynes, who has developed spacecraft instrumentation to study the surfaces and atmospheres of planets, satellites and small bodies. He is a PI for the Huygens probe/lander on the Cassini mission to Saturn and Saturn VI (Titan).	JPL · 17920
17921 Aldeobaldia	1999 GC_{13}	Anna Lisa De Obaldia, ISEF awardee in 2003, and IFAA recipient	JPL · 17921
17923 Strother	1999 GY_{16}	Nikol Strother mentored a finalist in the 2020 Regeneron Science Talent Search, a science competition for high school seniors. She teaches at the Los Alamos High School, Los Alamos, New Mexico.	IAU · 17923
17925 Dougweinberg	1999 GQ_{17}	Douglas Stanley Weinberg, ISEF awardee in 2003	JPL · 17925
17926 Jameswu	1999 GA_{18}	James Y. W. Wu, ISEF awardee in 2003	JPL · 17926
17927 Ghoshal	1999 GL_{20}	Shivani Ghoshal, ISEF awardee in 2003	JPL · 17927
17928 Neuwirth	1999 GJ_{21}	Melissa Marie Neuwirth, ISEF awardee in 2003	JPL · 17928
17929 Sully	1999 GQ_{21}	Brandon Sullivan mentored a finalist in the 2020 Regeneron Science Talent Search, a science competition for high school seniors. He teaches at the Wellington School, Columbus, Ohio.	IAU · 17929
17930 Kennethott	1999 GE_{24}	Kenneth Richard Ott, ISEF awardee in 2003	JPL · 17930
17932 Viswanathan	1999 GA_{35}	Nitya Kalyani Viswanathan, ISEF awardee in 2003	JPL · 17932
17933 Haraguchi	1999 GM_{36}	Whitney Takeo Haraguchi, ISEF awardee in 2003	JPL · 17933
17934 Deleon	1999 GK_{39}	Christopher Lee DeLeon, ISEF awardee in 2003	JPL · 17934
17935 Vinhoward	1999 GX_{45}	Vincent Michael Howard, ISEF awardee in 2003	JPL · 17935
17936 Nilus	1999 HE_{3}	Nilus, son of Oceanus and Tethys, is the personified god of the river Nile in classical mythology. The annual ebb and flow of the Nile sparked the advent of agriculture and farming around 6500 years ago. This inexorably led to the development of an ancient Egyptian civilization that was a keystone for those that followed.	JPL · 17936
17938 Tamsendrew	1999 HW_{6}	Tamsen Alicia Drew, ISEF awardee in 2003, and IFAA recipient	JPL · 17938
17939 Shanethread	1999 HH_{8}	Shane Thread mentored a finalist in the 2020 Regeneron Science Talent Search, a science competition for high school seniors. He teaches at the Signature School, Evansville, Indiana.	IAU · 17939
17940 Kandyjarvis	1999 JK_{2}	Kandy S. Jarvis (born 1966) is a geologist who has made seminal contributions to solar system object composition science and supported human space flight endeavors. She was a primary investigator and writer of the Columbia accident Crew Survival Report	JPL · 17940
17941 Horbatt	1999 JW_{2}	Paul Allen Horbatt (born 1946), a skilled mechanical craftsman who has contributed greatly to the development of the instrumentation at Goodricke-Pigott Observatory, near Tucson, where this minor planet was discovered. His familiarity with detector enclosures and vacuum seals greatly speeded the fabrication of the instruments	JPL · 17941
17942 Whiterabbit	1999 JG_{6}	The White Rabbit, character in Lewis Carroll's Alice's Adventures in Wonderland. When Alice hears the Rabbit (who, of course, has pink eyes) talking to itself, she follows it down a huge rabbit-hole under a hedge, and her adventures begin. The name was suggested by T. Urata, and the citation was prepared by R. E. Asher.	JPL · 17942
17944 Lansbury	1999 JF_{7}	Angela Brigid Lansbury, Irish-British and American actress, producer, and singer.	IAU · 17944
17945 Hawass	1999 JU_{8}	Zahi Hawass (born 1947), an Egyptian archeologist who showed unfailing dedication in the battle of preserving Egypt's monuments and antiquities. He has also been involved in many important discoveries such as the pyramid builder's necropolis at Giza and golden mummies of El Bahariya Oasis.	JPL · 17945
17950 Grover	1999 JS_{18}	Vaishali Kiran Grover, ISEF awardee in 2003	JPL · 17950
17951 Fenska	1999 JO_{19}	Kristen Elaine Fenska, ISEF awardee in 2003	JPL · 17951
17952 Folsom	1999 JT_{19}	Jean Marie Folsom, ISEF awardee in 2003	JPL · 17952
17954 Hopkins	1999 JP_{20}	Brandon James Hopkins, ISEF awardee in 2003	JPL · 17954
17955 Sedransk	1999 JZ_{22}	Kyra Lauren Sedransk, ISEF awardee in 2003	JPL · 17955
17956 Andrewlenoir	1999 JC_{28}	Andrew Allen Lenoir, ISEF awardee in 2003	JPL · 17956
17958 Schoof	1999 JE_{33}	Jenna Marie Schoof, ISEF awardee in 2003	JPL · 17958
17959 Camierickson	1999 JZ_{33}	Camille Sara Myerchin Erickson, ISEF awardee in 2003	JPL · 17959
17960 Liberatore	1999 JB_{36}	Katie Lynn Liberatore, ISEF awardee in 2003	JPL · 17960
17961 Mariagorodnitsky	1999 JB_{37}	Maria Gorodnitsky, ISEF awardee in 2003	JPL · 17961
17962 Andrewherron	1999 JD_{37}	Andrew Jared Herron, ISEF awardee in 2003	JPL · 17962
17963 Vonderheydt	1999 JM_{40}	Molly von der Heydt, ISEF awardee in 2003	JPL · 17963
17965 Brodersen	1999 JO_{43}	Carl Harold Brodersen, ISEF awardee in 2003	JPL · 17965
17967 Bacampbell	1999 JT_{45}	Blake Allen Campbell, ISEF awardee in 2003	JPL · 17967
17969 Truong	1999 JB_{47}	Gold Silver Truong, ISEF awardee in 2003	JPL · 17969
17970 Palepu	1999 JA_{48}	Sita Chandrika Palepu, ISEF awardee in 2003	JPL · 17970
17971 Samuelhowell	1999 JZ_{50}	Samuel James Amberson Howell, ISEF awardee in 2003	JPL · 17971
17972 Ascione	1999 JH_{51}	Andrew Gerard Ascione, ISEF awardee in 2003, and European Union Contest for Young Scientists Award recipient.	JPL · 17972
17976 Schulman	1999 JQ_{54}	Aaron David Schulman, ISEF awardee in 2003, and European Union Contest for Young Scientists Award recipient.	JPL · 17976
17980 Vanschaik	1999 JN_{56}	Katherine Douglas Van Schaik, ISEF awardee in 2003	JPL · 17980
17982 Simcmillan	1999 JK_{57}	Simeon McMillan, ISTS awardee in 2004, and ISEF awardee in 2003	JPL · 17982
17983 Buhrmester	1999 JV_{59}	Michael Duane Buhrmester, ISEF awardee in 2003	JPL · 17983
17984 Ahantonioli	1999 JU_{60}	Alexandra Hope Antonioli, ISEF awardee in 2003	JPL · 17984
17988 Joannehsieh	1999 JR_{62}	Joanne Charlotte Hsieh, ISEF awardee in 2003	JPL · 17988
17991 Joshuaegan	1999 JN_{65}	Joshua Harris Egan, ISEF awardee in 2003	JPL · 17991
17992 Japellegrino	1999 JR_{65}	Jason Scott Pellegrino, ISEF awardee in 2003	JPL · 17992
17993 Kluesing	1999 JT_{68}	Daniel Lennard Kluesing, ISEF awardee in 2003	JPL · 17993
17995 Jolinefan	1999 JF_{74}	Joline Marie Fan, ISEF awardee in 2003, and IFAA recipient	JPL · 17995

back to top

Preceded by 16,001–17,000	Meanings of minor-planet names List of minor planets: 17,001–18,000	Succeeded by 18,001–19,000
