= Kiek =

Kiek is a surname. Notable people with the name include:

- Edward S. Kiek (1883–1959), Congregationalist minister, principal of Parkin College, Adelaide, South Australia
- Israël David Kiek (1811–1899), early portrait photographer who gave rise to the Dutch expression kiekje, meaning snapshot
- Winifred Kiek (1884–1975), the first woman to be ordained in the Christian Ministry in Australia

== See also ==
- 17521 Kiek, minor planet
- Kiek in de Kök, old Low German nickname for towers
- Kiek in de Kök, Tallinn, artillery tower in Tallinn, Estonia, built in 1475
