= Elysia Segal =

Science Communicator

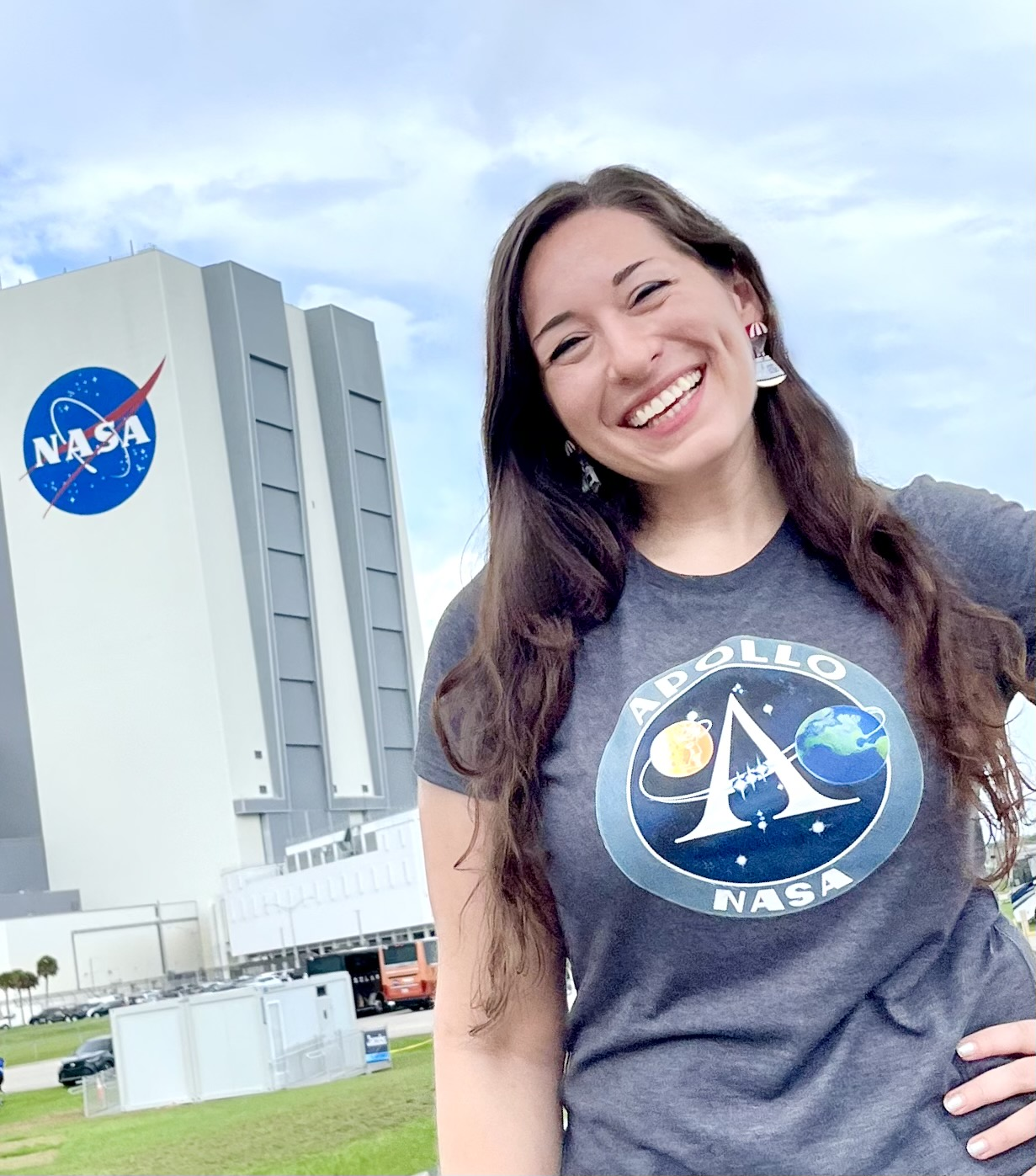
- Elysia Segal in 2022
- Born: Pittsburgh, Pennsylvania
- Education: New York University; CUNY School of Professional Studies
- Occupations: Science Communicator, Actress, and Playwright
- Website: http://elysiasegal.com

Elysia Segal is an American science communicator, actress, and playwright. She has created a number of STEM-based museum theatre performances for cultural institutions across the United States and is a regular host of programming for the Intrepid Museum and space commentator for NASASpaceflight.com.

== Early life and education ==
Elysia Segal was born in Pittsburgh, Pennsylvania and attended Lake Highland Preparatory School in Orlando, Florida. While there, she was a finalist at the NCFL Speech & Debate National Championships and was elected to the Teen Arts Advisory Council for Orlando Mayor Glenda Hood.

Segal also participated in the school's nationally acclaimed ASPIRE Science Research Program, and has since credited this experience as influential to her passion for blending STEM topics with the arts. She was a semifinalist in the Discovery Channel Young Scientist Challenge and won first place at the Intel International Science and Engineering Fair with her research project analyzing the use of proteoglycans as a biomarker for congenital hydrocephalus. Main-belt asteroid 17795 Elysiasegal was named for her in recognition of this achievement.

Segal graduated from New York University's Tisch School of the Arts Drama program and studied at the Stella Adler Studio of Acting, the CAP21 Musical Theatre Conservatory, Stonestreet Studio's Film & TV Workshop, and at the Abbey Theatre in Dublin, Ireland. She went on to earn a Masters of Arts in the inaugural class of the Museum Studies program at the CUNY School of Professional Studies, developed in collaboration with the New-York Historical Society.

== Acting career ==
Segal's performance credits include her portrayal of the performance artist "Maureen" in RENT, The Legend of Flowers (Lincoln Center), George M. Cohan: In His Own Words (Lake Placid Center for the Arts), and The Who's Tommy (DeBaun Center for Performing Arts). She has also made a number of film and television appearances including The Music Never Stopped (Official Selection of the 2011 Sundance Film Festival), Going the Distance, Royal Pains, and Mercy, and has appeared in numerous museum theatre performances at cultural sites across the United States (see § Museum Theatre & Science Communication below).

In 2010, Segal starred as "Gillian" in Together This Time: A New Rock Musical by Andrew Heyman and Zac Kline, a role which she originated at NYU's Graduate Musical Theatre Writing Program two years prior. She also appeared in the show's off-Broadway premiere later that summer at the Lucille Lortel Theater.

She also portrayed "Beth II" in Ryan O'Leary's 'Y: The Last Man', a film adapted from the Brian K. Vaughan and Pia Guerra graphic novels of the same name. It premiered at the 2011 Litchfield Hills Film Festival and screened with a Q&A panel at I-CON 30 at Stony Brook University. She received a Best Actress nomination at the 2011 FTC Luminaries for her appearance in Louis Matta's time-travel film The Traveler, which went on to win Audience Favorite Sci-Fi Mini Short in the 2011 ShockerFest International Film Festival.

Segal received a nomination for Outstanding Actress for her performance as "Daisy Miller" in the world premiere of the play Pushing Daisy at the Gene Frankel Theatre. The largely autobiographical piece by playwright and cancer survivor Lauren Epsenhart was the first to be produced by The Pushing Daisy Project, an organization that promotes cancer awareness by showcasing new works.

Writer/director Terence Krey later cast her as "Cassandra Southwick" in his web series pilot Entwined, which won "Best Use of Numerical Element" in Celebrate the Web 5, and then again as "Chloe," the lead in his genre-blending indie-horror-romance feature Not A Monster. They collaborated the next year for Celebrate the Web 6 as well on the steampunk-inspired pilot "The Belle and The Bot," with Segal (also a producer on the project) playing Abigail, the time-traveling Southern belle from the year 1863, and Krey as her tragic robot husband, Edward. The show won "Judge's Choice" and runner up for "Audience Choice" in the competition, and was screened at VidCon 2012. She also co-produced and starred as Penelope in Krey's supernatural dramedy feature film, "Winter Slides."

In 2014, she was cast as the lead in Things I Left on Long Island, a new play by Jonathan Larson Grant recipient Sara Cooper, which premiered at the New York International Fringe Festival. The play was the recipient of the 2014 Fringe Excellence Award for Playwriting and was a TimeOut New York Critics' Pick. She had previously workshopped the play with Cooper at Theater for the New City and Dixon Place. She also workshopped material from Cooper's musical Elevator Heart, music by Amy Burgess, Julia Meinwald and Julianne Wick-Davis.

== Museum Theatre & Science Communication ==
Segal has researched, written and performed original theatrical shows and experiences for school groups and the public at a number of institutions, including the New York Transit Museum, the New-York Historical Society, and the DAR Museum, among others. Her work leans heavily on primary sources and often highlights underrepresented women in history and science such as Victorian citizen scientist turned inventor Mary Walton and 1950s aviation/space pioneer Betty Skelton.

She has created a number of shows for the Intrepid Museum in New York City, including a recreation of a 1940s Armed Forces radio broadcast and a performance about the life of teen aviator Elinor Smith who rose to fame in the 1920s after illegally flying under New York City's East River Bridges. In 2022, she launched a heavily researched one-woman show based on the experiences of Betty Skelton, the first woman to undergo the physical and psychological tests of the Mercury astronaut program. She also oversaw the innovative National Endowment for the Humanities research and performance residency Crossing the Line: Bringing History to Life with Teens, in which she guided students in the development of their research, analysis, interpretation and writing skills through their creation of original performance pieces based upon primary and secondary sources.

During the COVID-19 pandemic, she hosted an educational live-streaming series for the museum called Intrepid Adventures. She currently produces and hosts a variety of events at the Museum, including their monthly virtual space show Astro Live, which received a Communicator Award for Excellence in the Educational Series category. She also hosts the weekly space news roundup show This Week in Spaceflight for NASASpaceFlight.

Segal served as the president of the International Museum Theatre Alliance, and in 2022 she was selected to serve as a NASA Solar System Ambassador, an educational public engagement effort that encourages communication about the science, discoveries, and excitement of NASA's space exploration missions. She speaks regularly at conferences and events about her work in the field.
