= Gatehouse of the Viru Gate =

Coordinates: 59°26′12″N 24°45′01″E

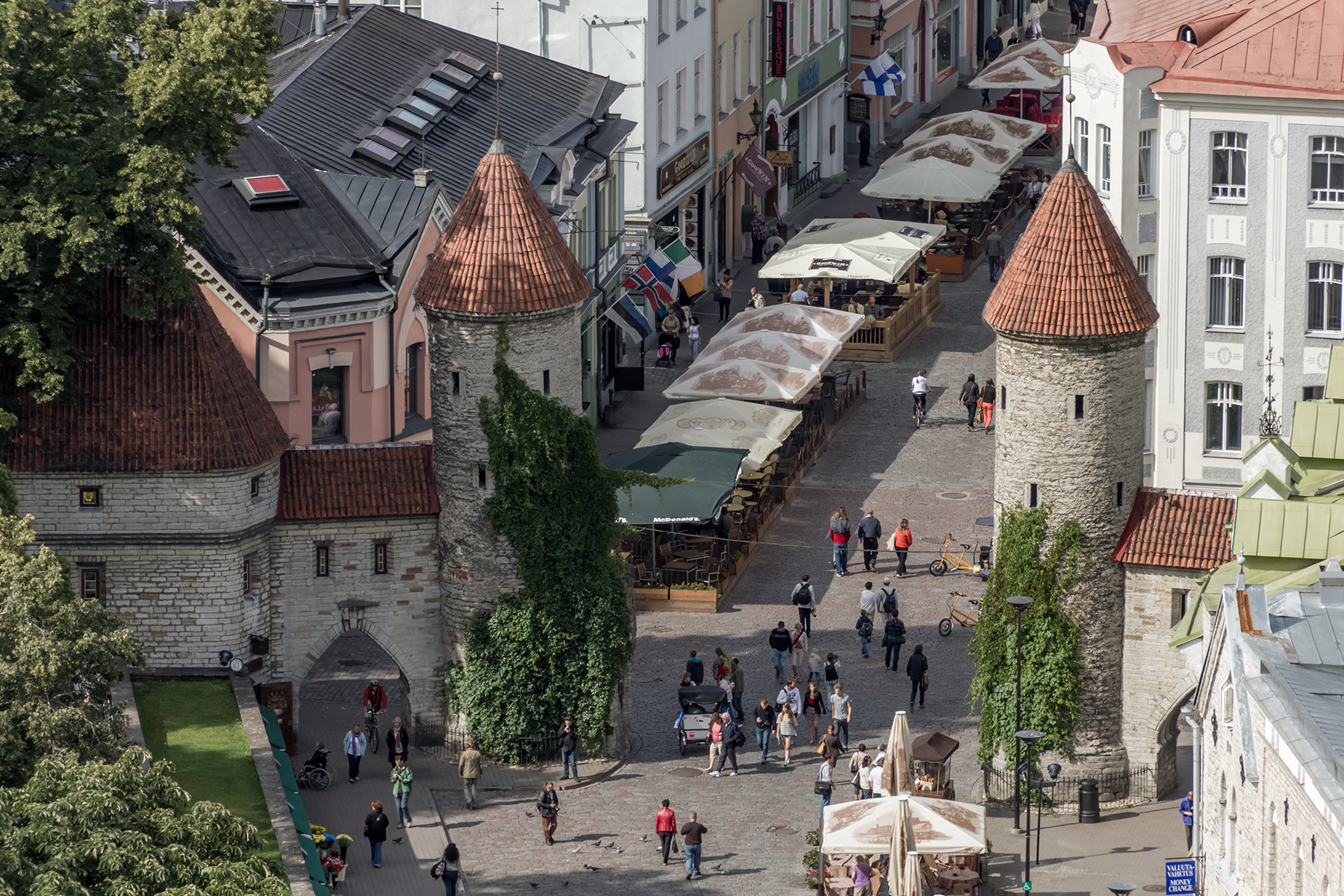
The gatehouse of the Viru Gate in August 2012

The gatehouse of the Viru Gate was a defensive structure built in the 14th century as part of the Tallinn city wall, associated with the Viru Gate. Two watchtowers of this structure remain, which are often mistaken for remnants of the original Viru Gate destroyed in the 19th century during city expansion. The surviving watchtowers of the Viru Gate are located in Tallinn Old Town at the intersection of Viru Street, Vana-Viru Street, and Valli Street in the Old Town district. The original name of the Viru Gate, or Savivärav (German: Lehmporte), originated from large clay pits that existed in the area known as Viru Square.

From the fortress gate of Vana-Viru Street, it was possible to access the road leading towards Narva along the eastern side of the city wall. This gate was also known as the Narva Gate. The Vana-Viru fortress gate was demolished in 1842, but a side post of the gate remains next to building no. 10 on Vana-Viru Street.

The surviving watchtowers of the Viru Gate gatehouse are registered as a trademark of Tallinn under the name "Viru Gate."

== Construction of the Viru Gate gatehouse ==
The first gatehouse of the Viru Gate was built around 1370 near the original gate, which had been established in 1345. In 1446, the old gatehouse was demolished, and a new two-story gatehouse was built with slender round watchtowers at its corners. By the 16th century, there were 8 gates in the Tallinn city wall, usually consisting of several towers connected by walls. The main tower of each gate was always rectangular, and the foregates were often equipped with one or two small round towers. The gatehouse was fortified from the sea side by the Viru Gate earthworks.

On the northern side of the gatehouse, it was connected to the Viru Gate watermill, built in the 14th century. On the other side of the gatehouse was a pond that received water from a canal originating at Lake Ülemiste, passing through the Harju Gate and Karja Gate watermills.

== Demolition of the Viru Gate gatehouse ==
Viru gatehouse building (1887)

In 1870, the Estonia Province government planned to expand the entrance road to the old town. The Tallinn city council valued the city wall's heritage only for the Kiek in de Kök and Fat Margaret towers, and agreed to demolish the Harju Gate, Pikk Jalg Gate Tower, and the Viru gatehouses. The Viru Gate gatehouses remained relatively intact until 1888, when they were demolished due to the construction of a horse tramway in Tallinn. The round towers at the corners, as well as parts of the bastion, were preserved. After the gatehouses were demolished, Viru Street was extended through the fortifications to the Russian Market, enabling regular horse tram service between the Old Market and Kadriorg by August 1888. In 1898, a small addition was made to the southern tower.

Between 1960 and 1962, all buildings adjacent to the city wall were demolished, but a 100-meter section of the defensive corridor was restored.

== Viru Gate gatehouses today ==
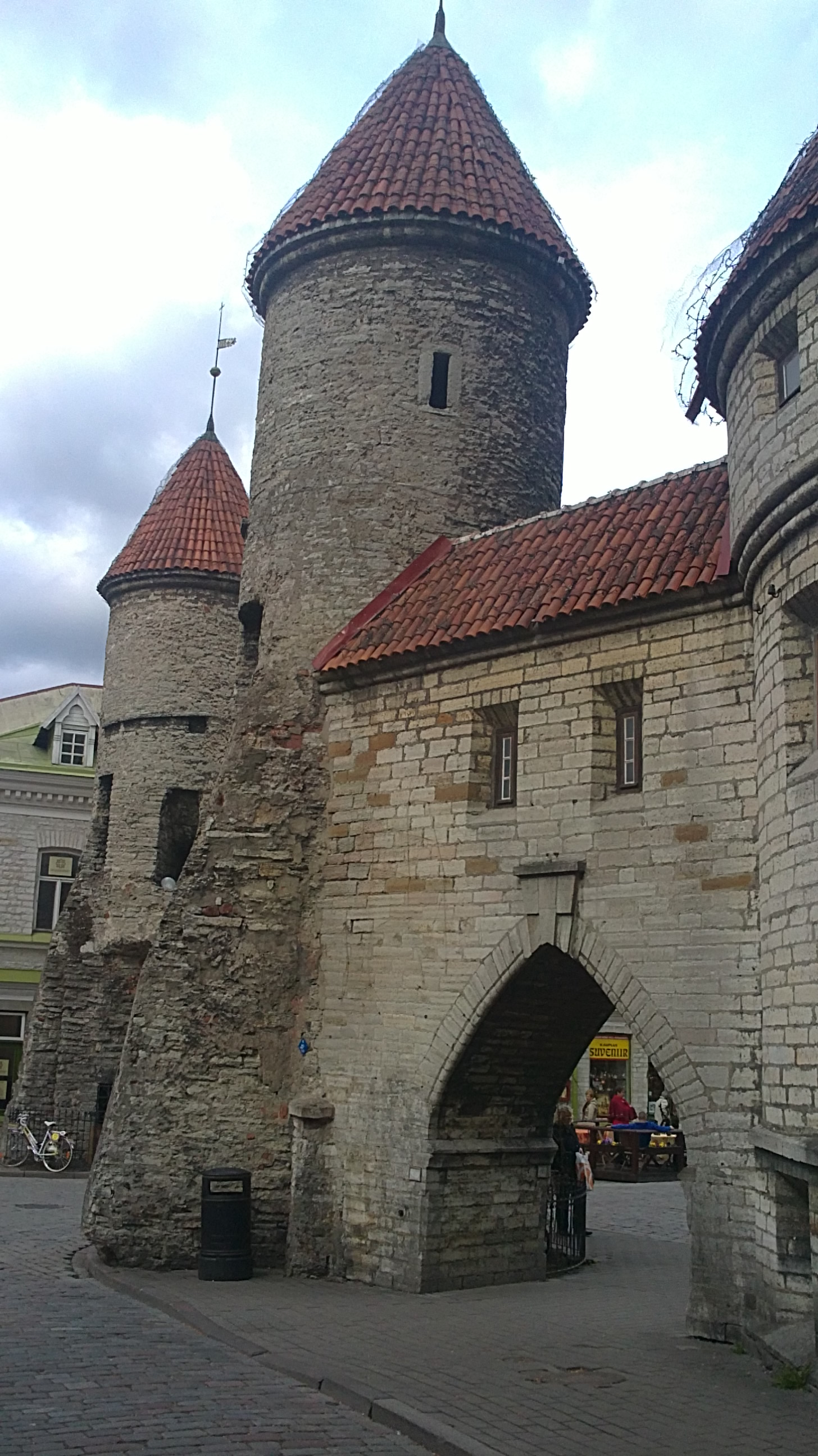
Right gate tower of the Viru Gate gatehouse, spring 2011

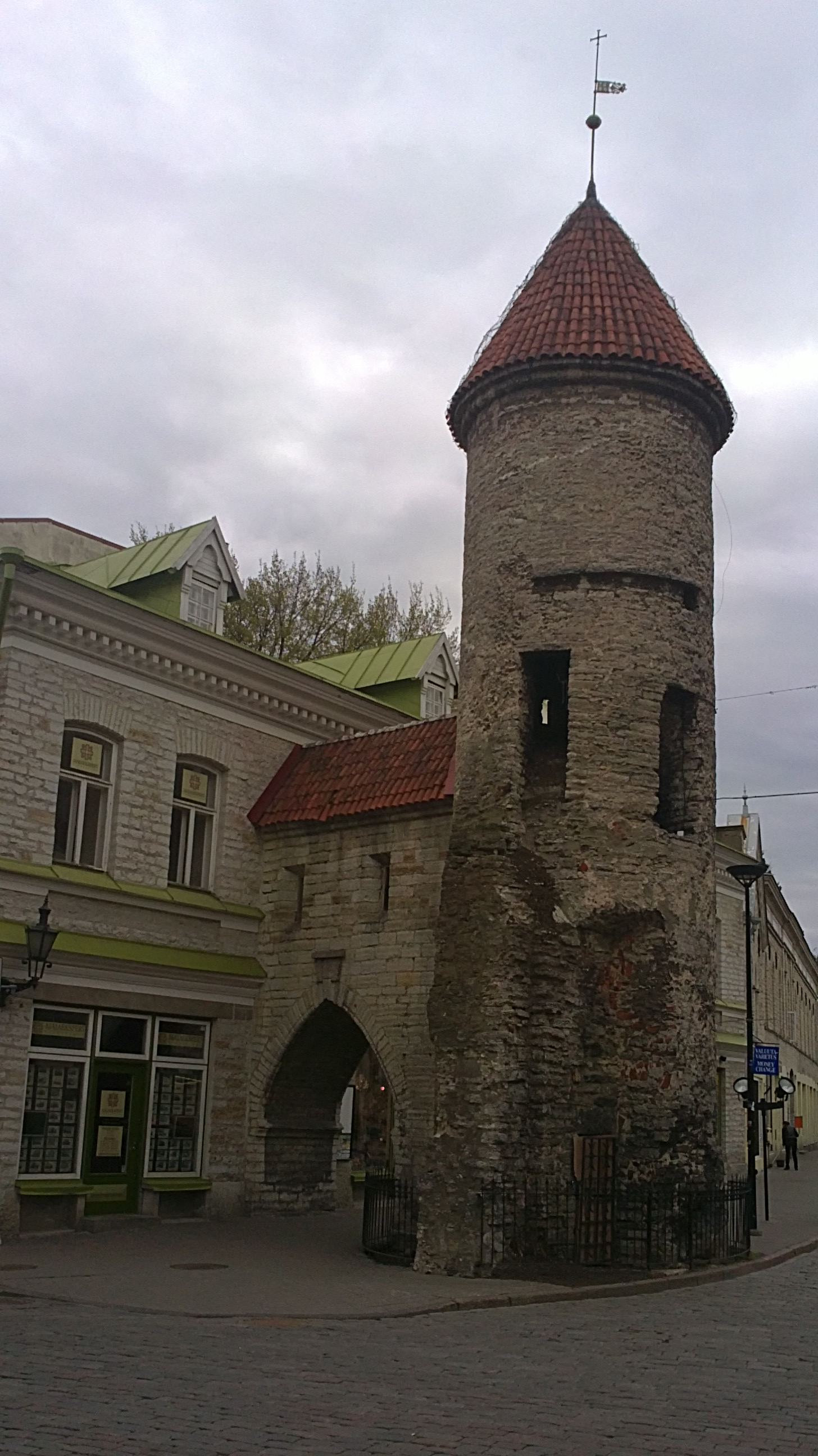
Left gate tower of the Viru Gate gatehouse, spring 2011

The Viru Gate gatehouses were reconstructed for the 1980 Summer Olympics as part of a rapid beautification project, but the work was later criticized for its poor quality, which led to extensive fungal damage in the tower structures. It was again reconstructed in 2003 for the Tallinn Old Town Days. During these restorations, damaged roof tiles on the watchtowers were replaced with so-called antique roof tiles.

The surviving watchtowers of the Viru Gate gatehouse are registered as a trademark of Tallinn under the name "Viru Gate".

== Literature ==
- Model of the old Viru Gate. Vaba Maa, July 9, 1936, no. 152, p. 1.
