= Elysia (given name) =

Elysia is a feminine given name that may refer to the following people.

== Given name ==
- Elysia Crampton American musician
- Elysia Rotaru (born 1984), Canadian actress
- Elysia Segal (born 1985), American actress

== Fictional characters ==
- Princess Elysia, a playable character in the video game Rayman Legends
- Miss Pink Elf/Elysia, a playable character in the video game Honkai Impact 3rd

== See also ==
- Elysia (disambiguation)
