= Geffert =

Geffert may refer to:

- 12747 Michageffert, a main-belt asteroid, named after Michael Geffert
- 17855 Geffert, a main-belt asteroid, named after Martin Geffert
- Johannes Geffert (born 1951), a German organist
- Martin Geffert (1922–2015) a German amateur astronomer
- Michael Geffert (born 1953), a German astronomer and discoverer of minor planets
- Viliam Geffert (born 1955), a Slovak theoretical computer scientist
