= Kanagawa (disambiguation) =

The word "Kanagawa" may refer to:

== Places ==
- Kanagawa Prefecture, one of the prefectures in Japan
- Kanagawa-ku, Yokohama, one of the 18 wards in Yokohama City, Japan

== People ==
- Kanagawa (金川), a Japanese surname

== See also ==
- Kanagawa hemolysin, a toxin produced by the bacterium Vibrio parahaemolyticus
- Kanagawa Station (Okayama), a railway station located in Okayama Prefecture
- Kanagawa Station (Kanagawa) (神奈川駅, Kanagawa eki), a railway station located in Kanagawa-ku, Yokohama
- 17683 Kanagawa, a main-belt asteroid discovered in 1997
- The Great Wave off Kanagawa (神奈川沖浪裏, Kanagawa oki nami ura), a famous woodblock print by Hokusai
