= Elysia =

Elysia may signify the following:

- Elysia (band), a deathcore band
- Elysia (gastropod), a genus of gastropods
- Elysium, a section of the underworld containing the Elysian Fields
- Elysium, the spacecraft in Pandorum
- Elysia, a terrestrial planet in Metroid Prime 3: Corruption
- Elysia (name)
