= Reach: A Space Podcast for Kids =

Podcast produced by Soundington Media

Reach: A Space Podcast for Kids is produced by Soundsington Media.

== Background ==
The podcast was created by Sandy Marshall and Nate DuFort as an outreach project of Solar System Ambassadors. Produced by Soundsington Media in Chicago, the podcast features interviews with astronauts and engineers, and includes activities for the listeners. In one of the episodes, the show has a live interview with NASA astronauts in space aboard the International Space Station. Marshall and DuFort had previously collaborated on improvisational comedy at The Second City. Guests have included Chris Hadfield, the first Canadian to walk in space. The podcast is hosted by Brian Holden and Meredith Stepien of Team StarKid fame.
