= Michael R. Combi =

American astronomer

Michael R. Combi (born 1952), is a space science professor at the University of Michigan. Combi's focus is planetary astronomy, and he specializes in the detailed modeling of cometary comae. His model for the distribution of water molecules and associated byproducts has been invaluable in understanding a wide variety of coma observations. He also contributed to discoveries related to the interactions between the solar wind and comet tails.

== Select publications ==
- Waite, Jack Hunter; Combi, Michael R.; Wing-Huen Ip; et al. (2006). "Cassini ion and neutral mass spectrometer: Enceladus plume composition and structure". Science. 311 (5766): 1419–22. doi:10.1126/science.1121290. PMID 16527970. Wikidata Q28301206.
- Capaccioni, Fabrizio; A Coradini; Filacchione, Gianrico; et al. (2015). "Cometary science. The organic-rich surface of comet 67P/Churyumov-Gerasimenko as seen by VIRTIS/Rosetta". Science. 347 (6220) aaa0628. Bibcode:2015Sci...347a0628C. doi:10.1126/science.aaa0628. PMID 25613895. Wikidata Q34459295.
- R. E. Johnson; Combi, Michael R.; J. L. Fox; et al. (2008). "Exospheres and Atmospheric Escape". Space Science Reviews. 139 (1–4): 355–397. Bibcode:2008SSRv..139..355J. doi:10.1007/s11214-008-9415-3. Wikidata Q106621536.
