= Mary Walton =

American inventor

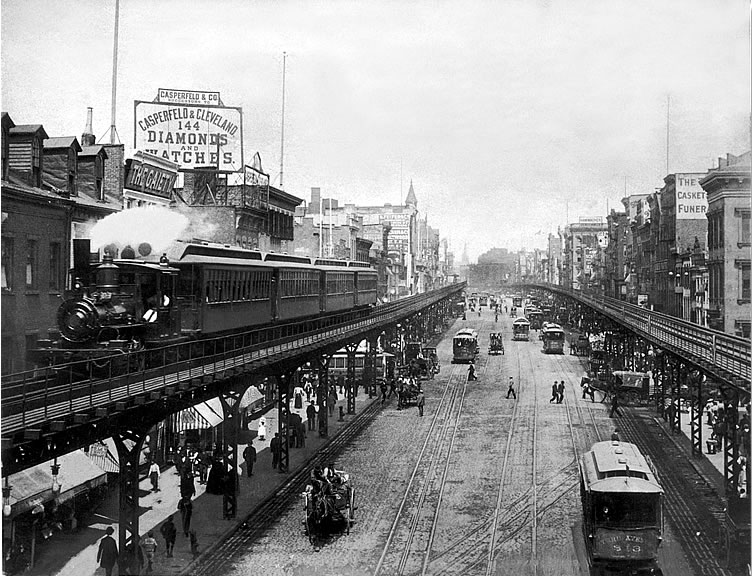
A steam train on the Third Avenue El, over the Bowery, New York City, 1896.

Mary Elizabeth (born c. 1827) was a 19th-century American inventor and independent engineer who pioneered early environmental protection technologies. She was awarded two major patents for systems designed to mitigate industrial air pollution and urban noise pollution. Her innovations were adopted by major transit lines in New York City and were hailed as transformative in both the United States and Great Britain. Walton is recognized as a precursor to modern environmental engineering, particularly in the fields of industrial scrubbing and vibration isolation.

== Early life and personal motivations ==
There is little documentation of Mary Walton's life. However, a statement made in 1884 and published in the Weekly Transcript of Lexington, Kentucky, provides some crucial information about her youth. Walton is quoted as saying, “My father had no sons, and believed in educating his daughters. He spared no pains or expense to this end". This foundation allowed her to navigate the then male-dominated world of mechanical patents with a confidence that was unheard of at the time in women.

Her commitment to independent innovation was also shaped by her life and personal experiences. After her husband reportedly showed one of her early prototypes to a male friend (who then stole the idea and patented it himself), Walton resolved that "there should be no man in it" for her future work. Later, when her son suggested she patent her railroad inventions in his name to avoid the stigma of being a "strong-minded woman", she reportedly told him, "Make your own inventions, and have your name put to them."

== Innovations ==
=== Atmospheric pollution control ===
By 1879, New York City was grappling with the environmental consequences of the Industrial Revolution. Heavy coal smoke from factories and locomotives created a persistent "dark cloud" over Manhattan, leading to significant respiratory issues and property damage. Walton, who operated a boarding house at the corner of 12th Street and 6th Avenue, experienced this pain point firsthand as soot from the elevated railway nearby covered her building.

On November 18, 1879, Walton was granted U.S. Patent No. 221,880 for an "Improvement in Locomotive and Other Chimneys". Her system was a mechanical "smoke-consumer" that diverted emissions through a series of water tanks. The water acted as a filter, trapping the particulates, soot, and noxious odors in suspension before the cleaned air reached the atmospheric pollutants, anticipating the development of modern "wet scrubbers" used in industrial smokestacks today.

=== Acoustic engineering and the "El" ===
In the early 1880s, the noise from New York's rapidly expanding elevated railway (the "El") was considered a major public nuisance, linked by some contemporary medical professionals to nervous breakdowns and urban stress. The city sought solutions from the era's most famous inventors, including Thomas Edison, who failed to produce a viable dampening system after months of experimentation.

Walton approached the problem through direct observation. She spent three days riding the trains and observed that the primary noise was not just from the engine but from the amplification caused by the wooden supports under the tracks. She built a miniature model railway in her basement to test various dampening materials. On February 8, 1881, she received Patent No. 237,422 for a system that cradled the rails in a wooden box framework. The box was painted with tar for weatherproofing, lined with cotton, and filled with sand. The sand absorbed the vibrations from the rails before they could be amplified by the support structure. The Metropolitan Railroad of New York purchased the rights to her invention for $10,000. This was a massive sum for a woman of her time, and a "royalty forever."

== Legacy and impact ==
=== Modern evolution ===
While the specific sand and cotton boxes used in 1881 have been phased out as elevated railways transitioned to underground subways in the 1930s, Walton's engineering principles remain foundational to modern urban design. Her smoke-filtration concept evolved into the sophisticated industrial scrubbers that modern coal and chemical plants use to comply with environmental regulations. Similarly, her use of "vibration isolation" (the concept of decoupling a vibrating source from its support structure using dampening materials) is a global standard for modern rail transit systems and seismic building designs.

=== Sociocultural impact ===
Walton is frequently cited as a STEM role model and a pioneer for women in engineering. The Woman's Journal noted in the late 19th century that where the "most noted machinists" of the age had failed (notably Edison), "a woman's brain did the work." Her success challenged the prevailing Victorian notion that women lacked the capacity for mechanical innovation and proved that experience living in urban environments could lead to technical solutions that theoretical science had missed.
