= Solar System Ambassadors =

Public outreach program of the Jet Propulsion Laboratory

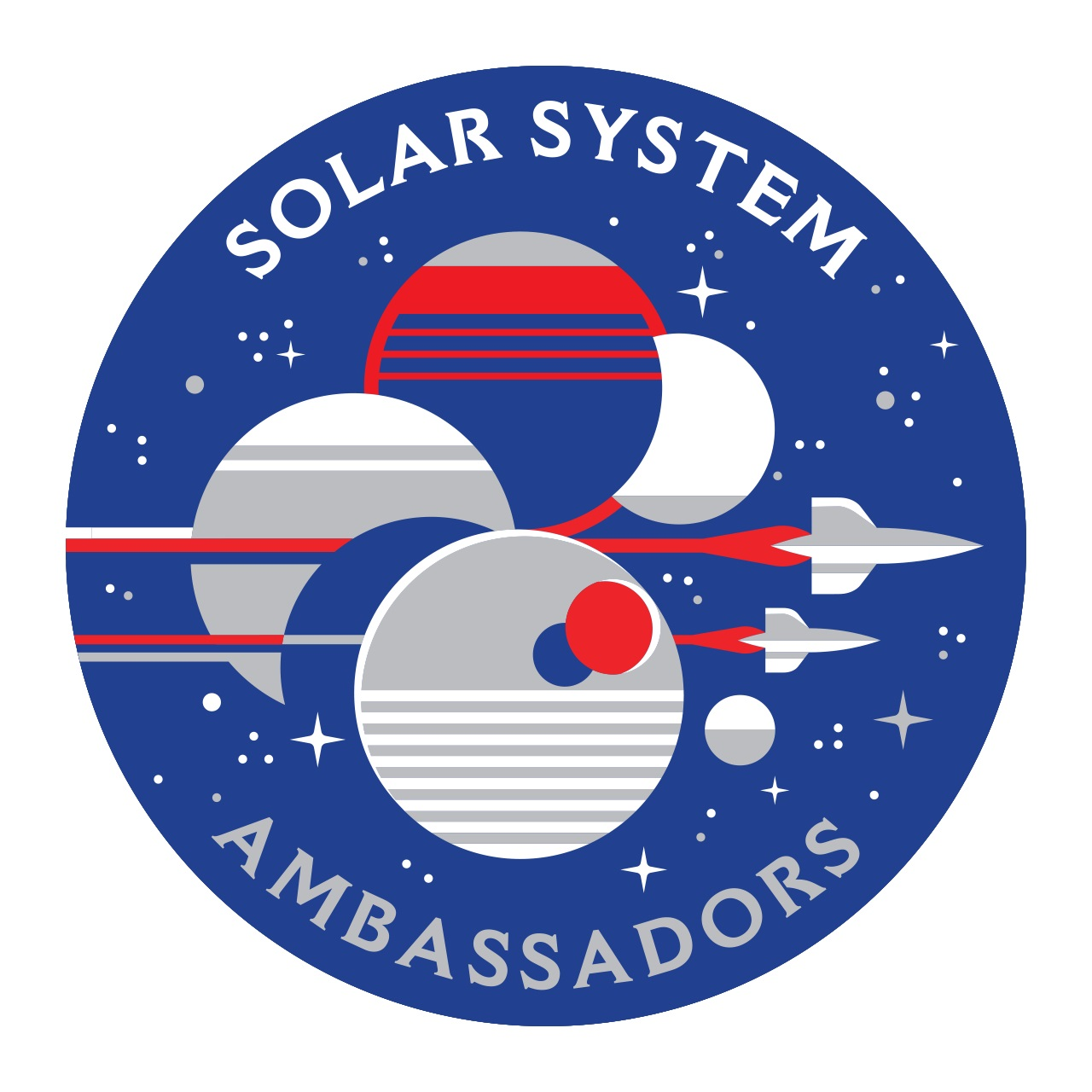
Solar System Ambassadors Logo

The Solar System Ambassadors Program is a public outreach program of the Jet Propulsion Laboratory. More than 1400 volunteers in all 50 states as well as Washington DC, Puerto Rico, the US Virgin Islands, and Guam share information about exploration missions and recent discoveries to their local communities. The program is an extension of the original Galileo Ambassadors program created to share information about the Galileo mission.

Ambassadors offer outreach programming free of charge at a variety of venues ranging from classrooms, to talks at museums, planetariums, and television.

== See also ==
- NASA Tweetup
- Reach: A Space Podcast for Kids
