= 17795 Elysiasegal =

Main-belt asteroid

Discovery
- Discovered by: LINEAR
- Discovery site: Lincoln Lab's ETS
- Discovery date: 20 March 1998

Designations
- Named after: Elysia Segal (2003 ISEF awardee)
- Alternative designations: 1998 FJ_{61} · 1999 NL_{14}
- Minor planet category: main-belt · (inner); Nysa–Polana complex

Orbital characteristics
- Epoch 4 September 2017 (JD 2458000.5)
- Uncertainty parameter 0
- Observation arc: 20.73 yr (7,570 days)
- Aphelion: 2.8037 AU
- Perihelion: 1.9797 AU
- Semi-major axis: 2.3917 AU
- Eccentricity: 0.1723
- Orbital period (sidereal): 3.70 yr (1,351 days)
- Mean anomaly: 168.50°
- Mean motion: 0° 15^{m} 59.4^{s} / day
- Inclination: 1.7316°
- Longitude of ascending node: 345.31°
- Argument of perihelion: 107.33°

Physical characteristics
- Dimensions: 5±2 km (calculated)
- Absolute magnitude (H): 14.6

17795 Elysiasegal (provisional designation 1998 FJ_{61}) is a asteroid from the inner regions of the asteroid belt, approximately 5 kilometers in diameter. It was discovered on 20 March 1998, by the LINEAR team at Lincoln Laboratory's Experimental Test Site in Socorro, New Mexico, in the United States. The asteroid was named after Elysia Segal, a 2003 ISEF awardee.

== Orbit and classification ==
Elysiasegal orbits the Sun in the inner main-belt at a distance of 2.0–2.8 AU once every 3 years and 8 months (1,351 days). Its orbit has an eccentricity of 0.17 and an inclination of 2° with respect to the ecliptic. A first precovery was taken by the Near-Earth Asteroid Tracking program in 1996, extending the asteroid's observation arc by 2 years prior to its official discovery observation.

== Naming ==
This minor planet was named for Elysia Segal, American actress and first-place winner at the 2003 Intel International Science and Engineering Fair, for her research analyzing the use of proteoglycans as a potential biomarker for congenital hydrocephalus. The approved naming citation was published by the Minor Planet Center on 14 June 2004 (M.P.C. 52173).

== Physical characteristics ==
Little is known about Elysiasegal's size, composition, albedo and rotation. Based on its absolute magnitude of 14.5, its diameter is likely to be between 3 and 7 kilometers, assuming an albedo in the range of 0.05 to 0.25.
