= Sara Cooper =

American dramatist

Sara Cooper is a New York-based novelist, playwright-lyricist, and librettist.

== Biography ==
Cooper graduated from the Graduate Musical Theatre Writing Program at the Tisch School of the Arts at New York University, where she is also currently part-time faculty. She is a member of The Author's Guild, ASCAP, and the Dramatists Guild of America.

Her debut novel, RAVENOUS, was published by Fernwood Publishing in 2026. RAVENOUS was a Finalist for the Tucson Book Awards. Her second novel, DEAD CENTER, will be published by Fernwood in April 2027.

Cooper is a recipient of the Richard Rodgers Award, a Jonathan Larson Grant from the American Theatre Wing, a New York State Council on the Arts Individual Theatre Artist Commission, and a Barrington Stage Company Spark Grant. She was an inaugural member of the 92Y Musical Theatre Lab Collective and was the first librettist to complete the Composers & The Voice Fellowship at American Opera Projects.

Cooper's major works as a playwright-lyricist include The Memory Show (book and lyrics by Sara Cooper, music by Zach Redler), which was produced Off-Broadway by Transport Group at The Duke on 42nd Street with a grant from the National Endowment for the Arts and subsequently ran in London (New Bard Productions) and Seoul (Water Gate Media) and was produced regionally at Barrington Stage Company and LAMB Theatre; Elevator Heart (music by Amy Burgess and Julia Meinwald), which was produced by THML Theatre Company in association with Access Theater, as well as at the University of San Francisco and workshopped at New York University; and the play Things I Left On Long Island, which premiered in the New York International Fringe Festival. Cooper's work as a librettist includes Breakfast and Windows (music by Zach Redler), produced by Lowbrow Opera Collective and Fault Lines (music by Gita Razaz), which was commissioned by Washington National Opera as part of the American Opera Initiative and which premiered at the John F. Kennedy Center for the Performing Arts.

In addition to her work as a writer, Cooper is also currently part-time faculty at New York University and Purchase College. She has also taught at Montclair State University, Guttman Community College, City College, and Lincoln Center.
