= Kiek in de Kök, Tallinn =

Artillery tower in Tallinn, Estonia

Coordinates: 59°26′05.1″N 24°44′28.5″E

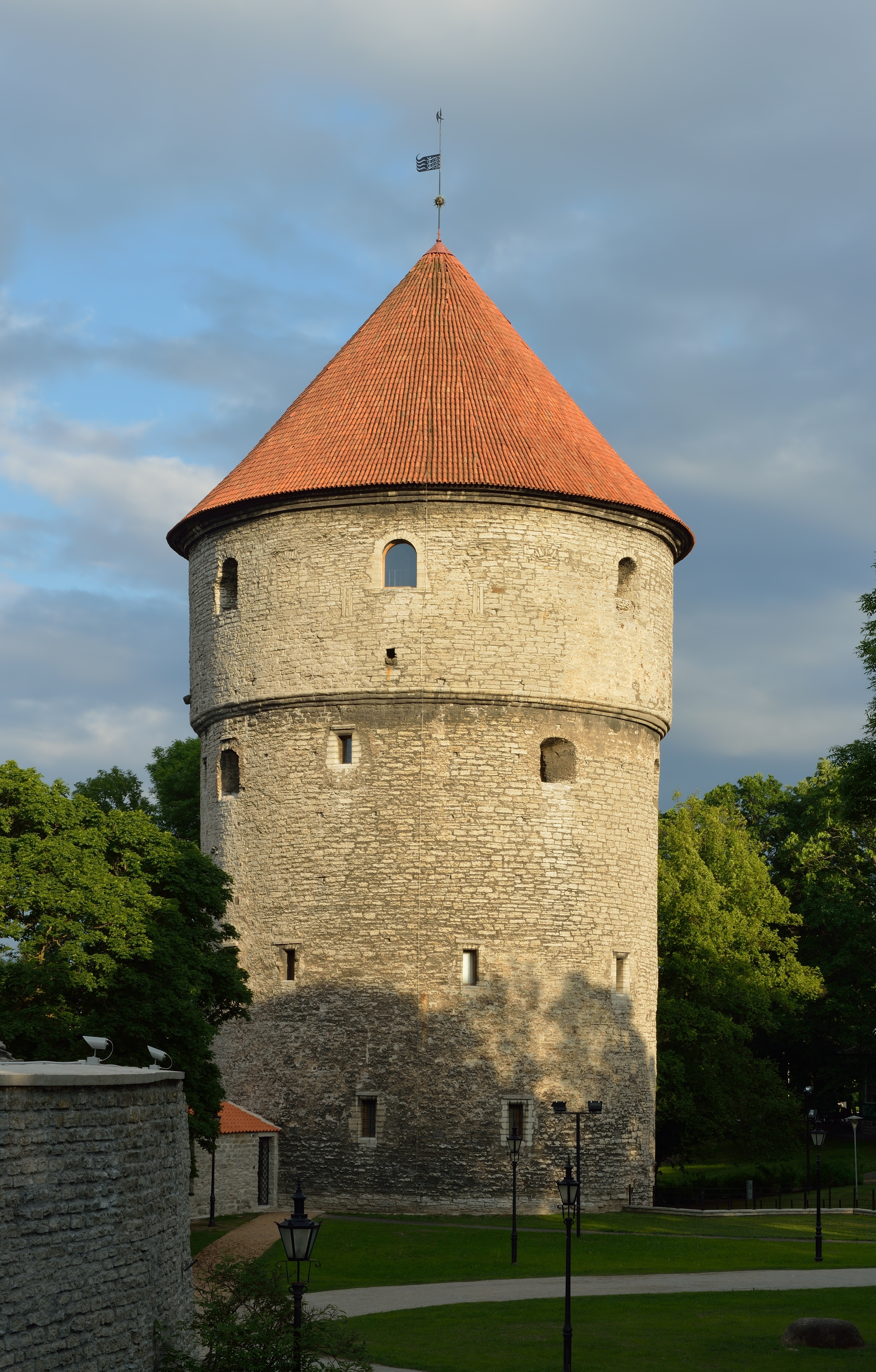
Kiek in de Kök

Kiek in de Kök (Low German: Kiek in de Kök, lit. 'Peek into the Kitchen') is an artillery tower in Tallinn, Estonia, built in 1475. It gained the name Kiek in de Kök from the ability of tower occupants to see into kitchens of nearby houses. The tower is 38 m (125 ft) high and has walls 4 m (13 ft) thick. Cannon balls dating back to 1577 are still embedded in its outer walls.

== Working life ==
Throughout its working life, the tower was extensively remodeled. Work in the 16th and 17th centuries saw the two lowest floors become hidden by earth works and the upper floors receive new gun openings and the uppermost floor a new outer wall and ceiling. By 1760, the tower had become obsolete. At this time it became a repository for archives and some floors were converted to apartments.

== Historic site ==
Twentieth-century restoration work saw the tower and surrounding area returned to a more historical look. The tower now serves as a museum and photographic gallery.
