= 17683 Kanagawa =

Main-belt asteroid

Discovery
- Discovered by: A. Asami
- Discovery site: Hadano Obs.
- Discovery date: 10 January 1997

Designations
- Named after: Kanagawa Prefecture (Japanese Prefecture)
- Alternative designations: 1997 AR_{16} · 1999 RE_{21}
- Minor planet category: main-belt · (outer) background

Orbital characteristics
- Epoch 4 September 2017 (JD 2458000.5)
- Uncertainty parameter 0
- Observation arc: 20.30 yr (7,415 days)
- Aphelion: 3.4566 AU
- Perihelion: 2.5108 AU
- Semi-major axis: 2.9837 AU
- Eccentricity: 0.1585
- Orbital period (sidereal): 5.15 yr (1,882 days)
- Mean anomaly: 332.02°
- Mean motion: 0° 11^{m} 28.32^{s} / day
- Inclination: 18.298°
- Longitude of ascending node: 358.73°
- Argument of perihelion: 194.71°

Physical characteristics
- Dimensions: 16.82±0.30 km 18.84±0.36 km 22.08±2.1 km (IRAS:2); 22.10 km (derived)
- Synodic rotation period: 5.895±0.004 h
- Geometric albedo: 0.0302±0.007 (IRAS:2); 0.0330 (derived); 0.043±0.002; 0.062±0.013
- Spectral type: C
- Absolute magnitude (H): 12.7 · 12.6 · 12.50

17683 Kanagawa (provisional designation 1997 AR_{16} ) is a carbonaceous background asteroid from the outer region of the asteroid belt, approximately 22 kilometers (14 miles) in diameter. It was discovered on 10 January 1997, by Japanese astronomer Atsuo Asami at the Hadano Observatory, located 60 kilometers southwest of Tokyo, Japan. The asteroid was later named after the Japanese Kanagawa Prefecture.

== Orbit and classification ==
Kanagawa orbits the Sun in the outer main-belt at a distance of 2.5–3.5 AU once every 5 years and 2 months (1,882 days). Its orbit has an eccentricity of 0.16 and an inclination of 18° with respect to the ecliptic. No precoveries were taken prior to its discovery. The asteroid's observation arc begins with its official discovery observation at Hadano.

== Naming ==
This minor planet was named after the Japanese Kanagawa Prefecture, in which the city of Hadano with its discovering observatory is located. Also located in the east of Kanagawa Prefecture, are the industrial cities of Yokohama and Kawasaki, the second and ninth biggest city of the country, respectively, and vital centers of Japan's economy. The discoverer, Atsuo Asami, graduated at Kanagawa University. The official naming citation was published by the Minor Planet Center on 9 March 2001 (M.P.C. 42365).

== Physical characteristics ==
=== Lightcurves ===
In October 2009, a rotational lightcurve of Kanagawa was obtained at the Wise Observatory in Israel. The photometric observations rendered a well-defined rotation period of 5.895±0.004 hours with a brightness variation of 0.4 magnitude (U=3).

=== Diameter and albedo ===
According to the space-based surveys carried out by the Infrared Astronomical Satellite IRAS, the Japanese Akari satellite, and NASA's Wide-field Infrared Survey Explorer with its subsequent NEOWISE mission, Kanagawa has a low albedo between 0.030 and 0.062, and a diameter of 16.8 to 22.1 kilometers. The Collaborative Asteroid Lightcurve Link adopts the results obtained by IRAS, and derives a carbonaceous albedo of 0.033 with a diameter of 22.1 kilometers and an absolute magnitude of 12.6.
