= Martin Geffert =

German astronomer

Martin Geffert (1922–2015) was a German amateur astronomer and co-founder of the Starkenburg Observatory in Heppenheim, Germany, where he had been the observatory's treasurer since its beginnings in 1970.

The main-belt asteroid 17855 Geffert, discovered at Stakenburg in 1998, was named in his honor. The official naming citation was published on 9 March 2001 (M.P.C. 42366). He died on 4 October 2015, at the age of 93.

Martin Geffert should not be confused with German astronomer Michael Geffert (born 1953), who has discovered several minor planets, and after whom the asteroid 12747 Michageffert has been named.
