= Israël David Kiek =

Dutch portrait photographer

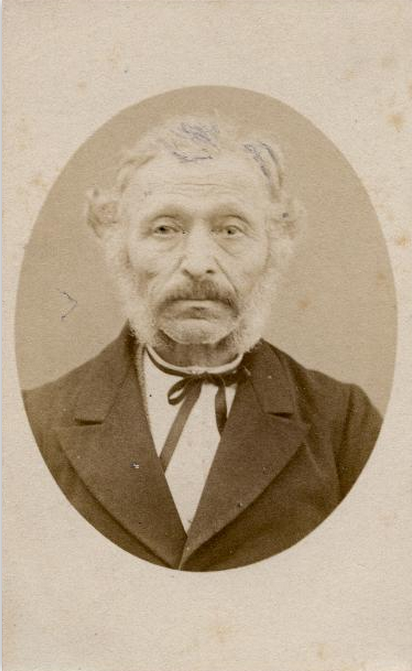
- Born: April 22, 1811; Groningen, Ems-Occidental, French Empire
- Died: May 15, 1899; Leiden, Netherlands
- Known for: Portrait photography

Israël David Kiek (April 22, 1811 – May 15, 1899) was an early portrait photographer who gave rise to the Dutch expression kiekje, meaning snapshot.

Kiek, who lived and worked in the Netherlands in the 19th century, produced cartes de visite, but was best known as a photographer of students at the University of Leiden. It was common practice among Leiden's students to have a group portrait taken by Kiek at his workshop on the Rijnsburgersingel. Groups of students would regularly appear on his doorstep in the early morning, after a long night of drinking, banging on the door to wake him and get their picture taken. The students' behaviour became so bad that Kiek eventually had a fence and raisable bridge installed to keep them out.

The student portraits were often not of the highest quality. Photographic portraits at that time required the sitters to remain still for a period of time, a task which proved difficult for the inebriated students, who therefore regularly appeared blurred in the photograph. The informal student photos, so different from the highly formal portraits of the time, came to be called kiekjes, an expression which has since become a general term meaning snapshots.

A pioneering element of his work was the use of close-up portrait shots, with the sitter's head filling the entire photograph. This was unusual in early portrait photography; not until the 1920s would close-ups become a common part of the photography repertoire.

== Biography ==
Born in Groningen into a Jewish family, Kiek was the son of watchmaker David Lazarus Kiek and Lea Levie Pinto. In his younger years, he worked in a variety of different professions: as chest maker, furniture maker, lottery ticket seller, merchant and butcher. On April 4, 1838, he wed Hendrika de Leeuw, and the couple moved from Groningen to Gouda. Their first-born, Louis Israël in 1838, was followed by 10 more surviving children. In the 1840s, the couple returned to Groningen, then moved to Amsterdam in 1852 before settling in Leiden in 1855.

Kiek may have experimented with daguerreotype photography at a young age, while still in Groningen. The first mention of Kiek as a portrait photographer was in 1858. He remained active as a photographer until at least 1889. Four of his sons (David, Abraham, Louis and Lion Kiek) followed in his footsteps and became photographers after learning the ropes in Kiek's workshop.

He worked not only in Leiden but also as a travelling photographer in other towns, including Gorinchem, Assen and Utrecht. In 1896-1898 he lived in Arnhem, before returning to Leiden, where he died at the age of 88.

== Remembrance ==
In 2001 the Kiekmonument, a monument to the photographer, was unveiled on the Rijnsburgersingel in Leiden, directly across from Kiek's former workshop. The monument is a work of art depicting a camera placed on a tripod. Peering through the camera viewer reveals 12 different photos taken by Kiek.

Belgian astronomer Eric Walter Elst named the asteroid 17521 Kiek after him in 1993. The district of IJburg in Amsterdam has a street named after him, the Kiekstraat, and Leiden has named a path after him, the Kiekpad.

In 2015 an exhibition of his work was held at Leiden's university library under the name Tussen Kunst en Kiek.

== Gallery ==
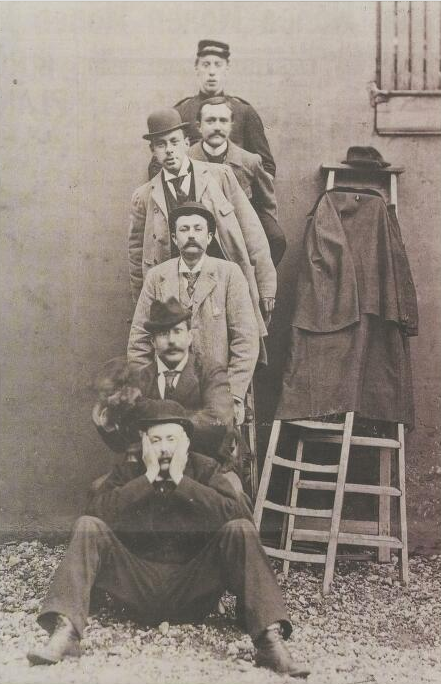
A kiekje made in c. 1885

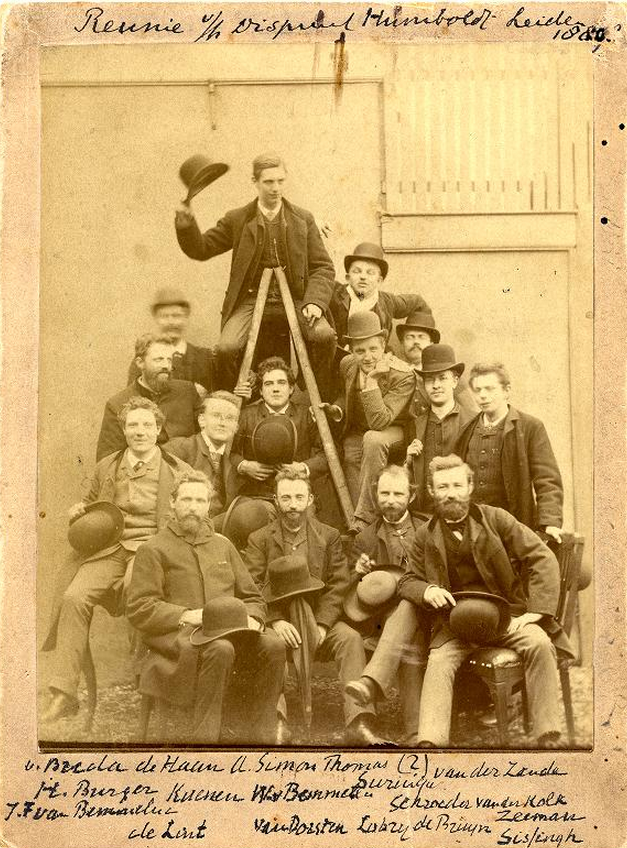
Reunion of student club Humboldt van Sociëteit Minerva, 1875-1885

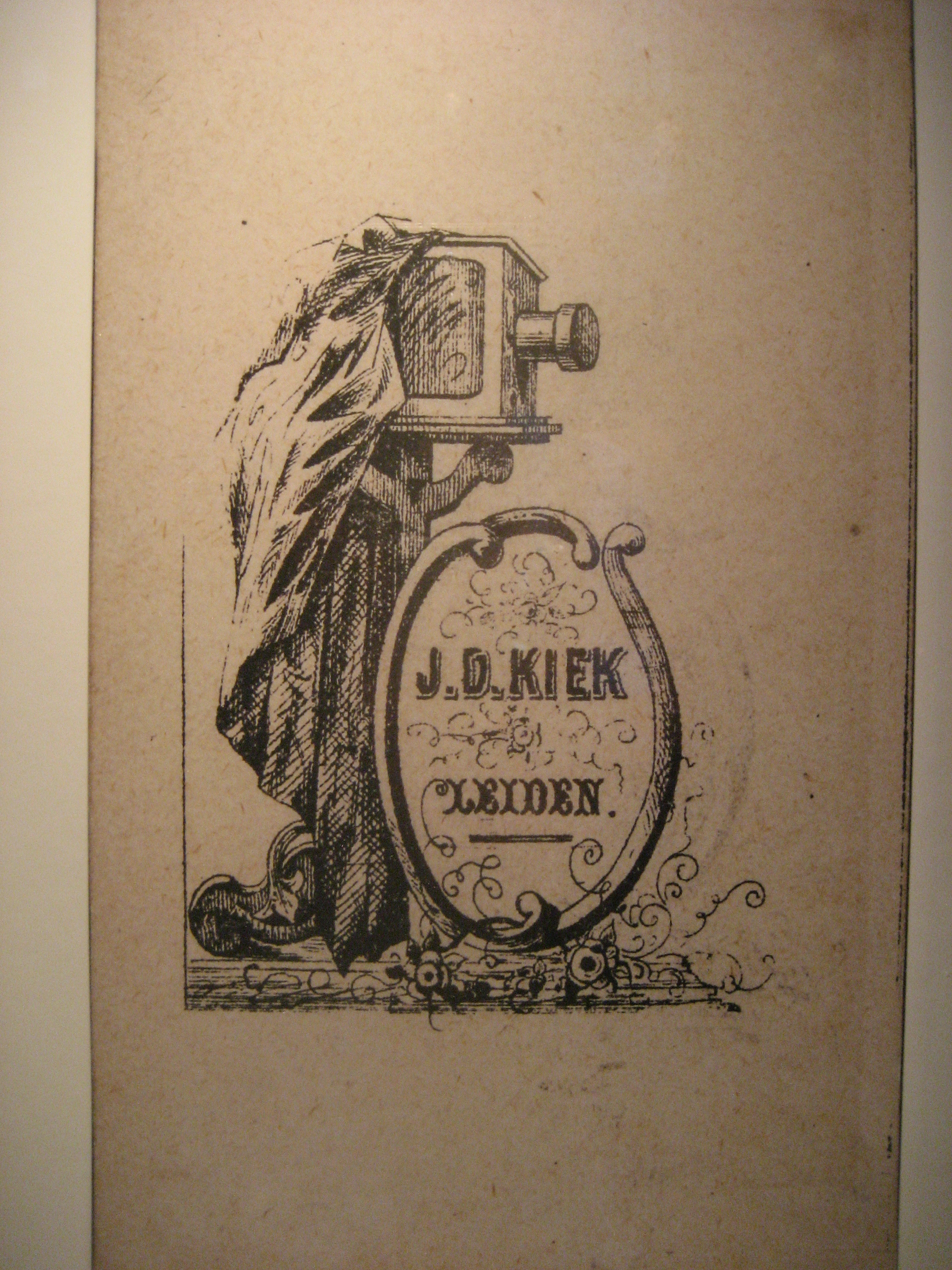
Kiek's logo

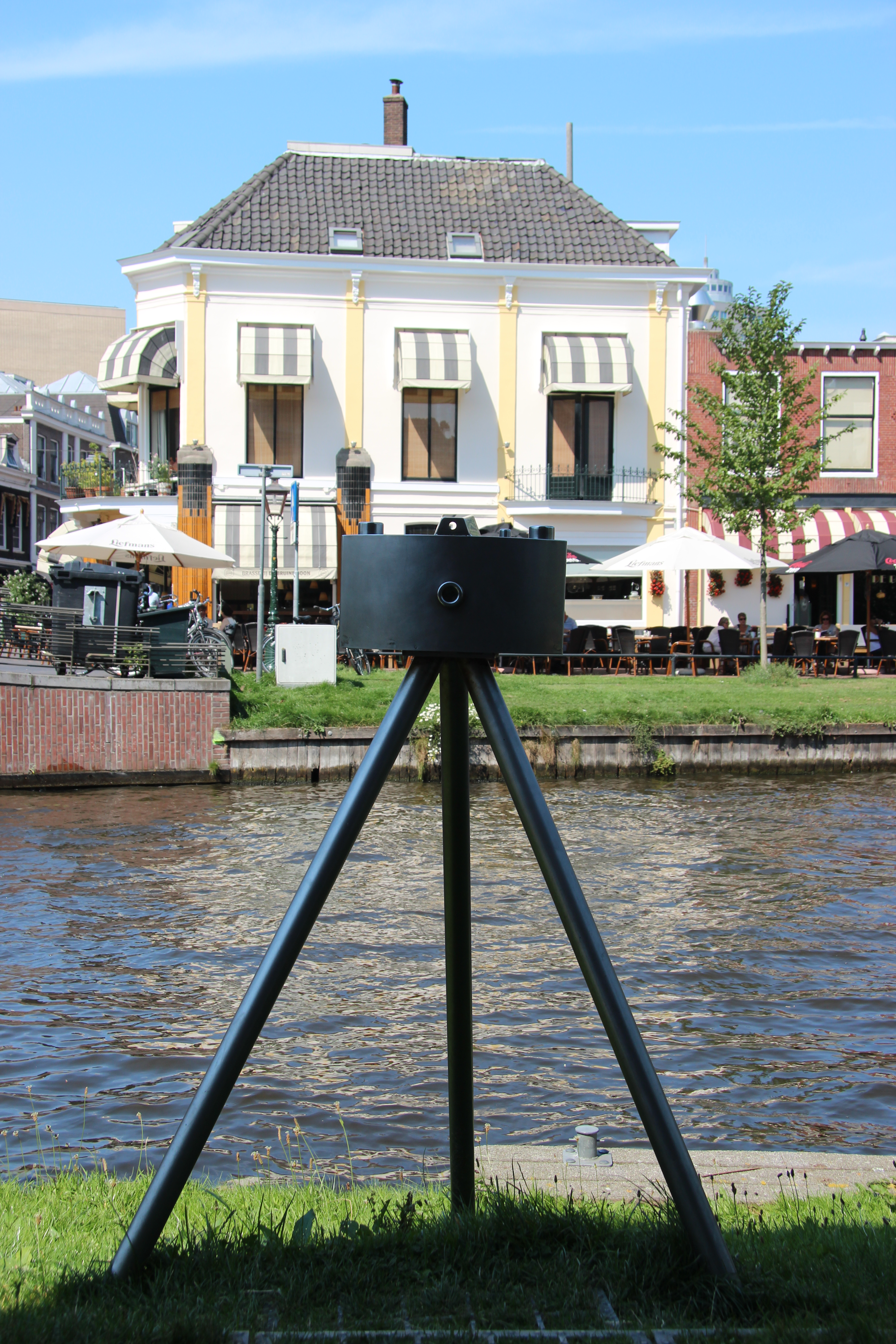
The Kiekmonument in Leiden
