= Kiek in de Kök =

Low German nickname for towers

Kiek in de Kök (Low German: Peek into the Kitchen) is an old Low German nickname for towers, mainly those that formed parts of town fortifications. They gained the name from the ability of tower occupants to see into kitchens of nearby houses. Due to the history of the Hanseatic League and the Teutonic Order, towers far outside modern Germany also bear this name, such as those in Gdańsk and Tallinn.

The Kiek in de Köks include:

- Kiek in de Kök, Tallinn
- Kiek in de Kök, Gdańsk
- Kiek in de Köken, Magdeburg
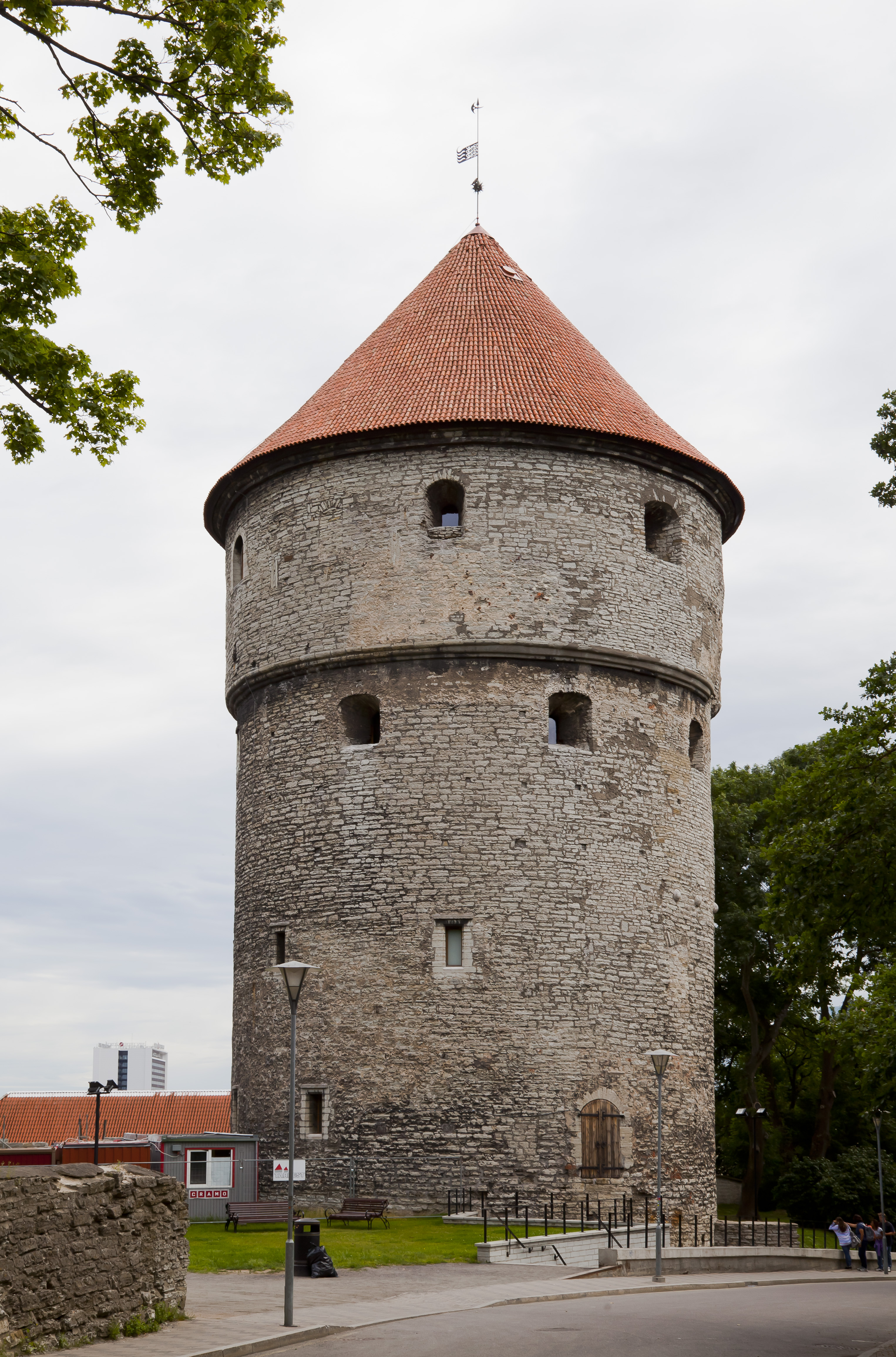
In Tallinn, Estonia

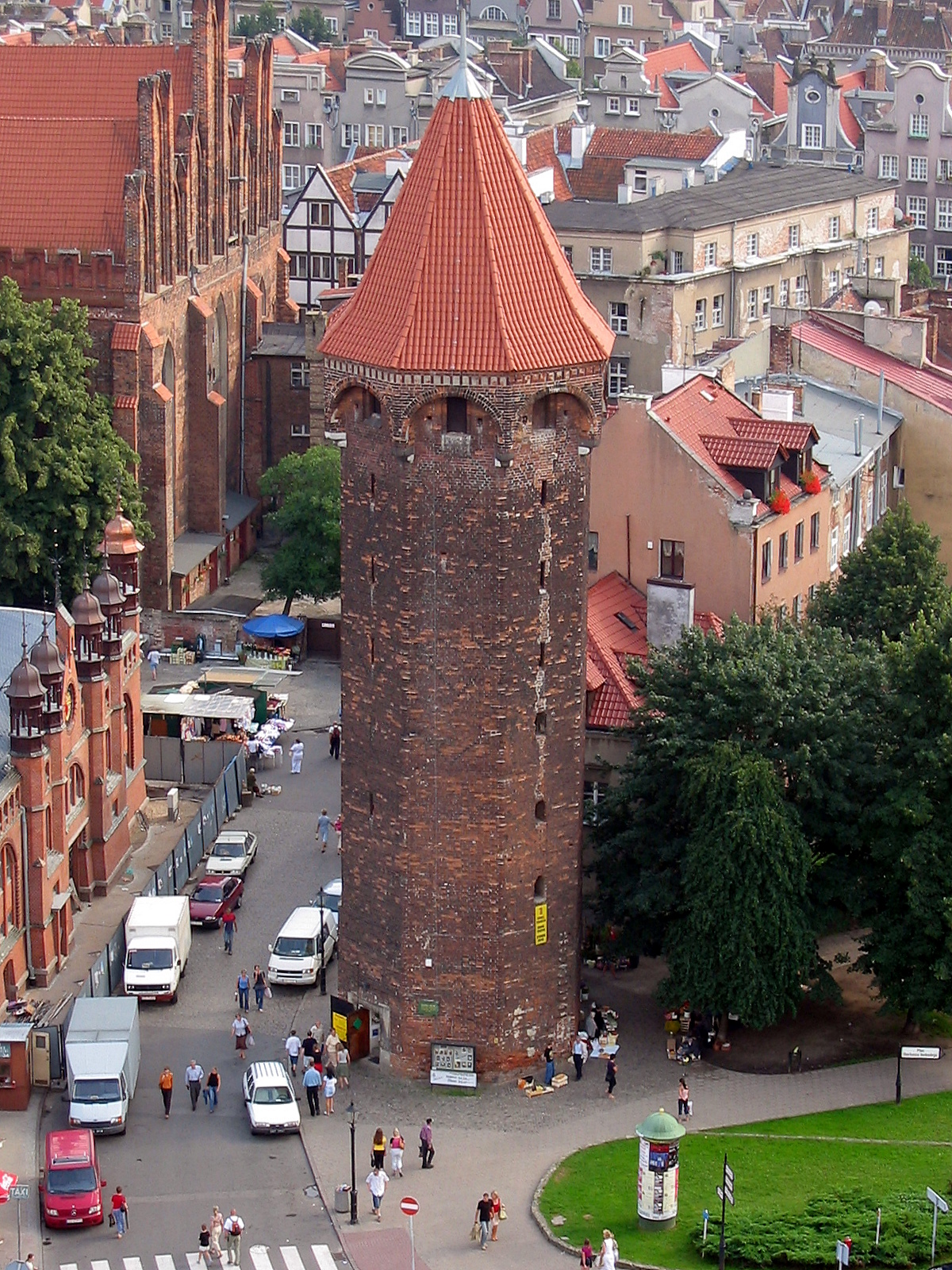
In Gdańsk, Poland

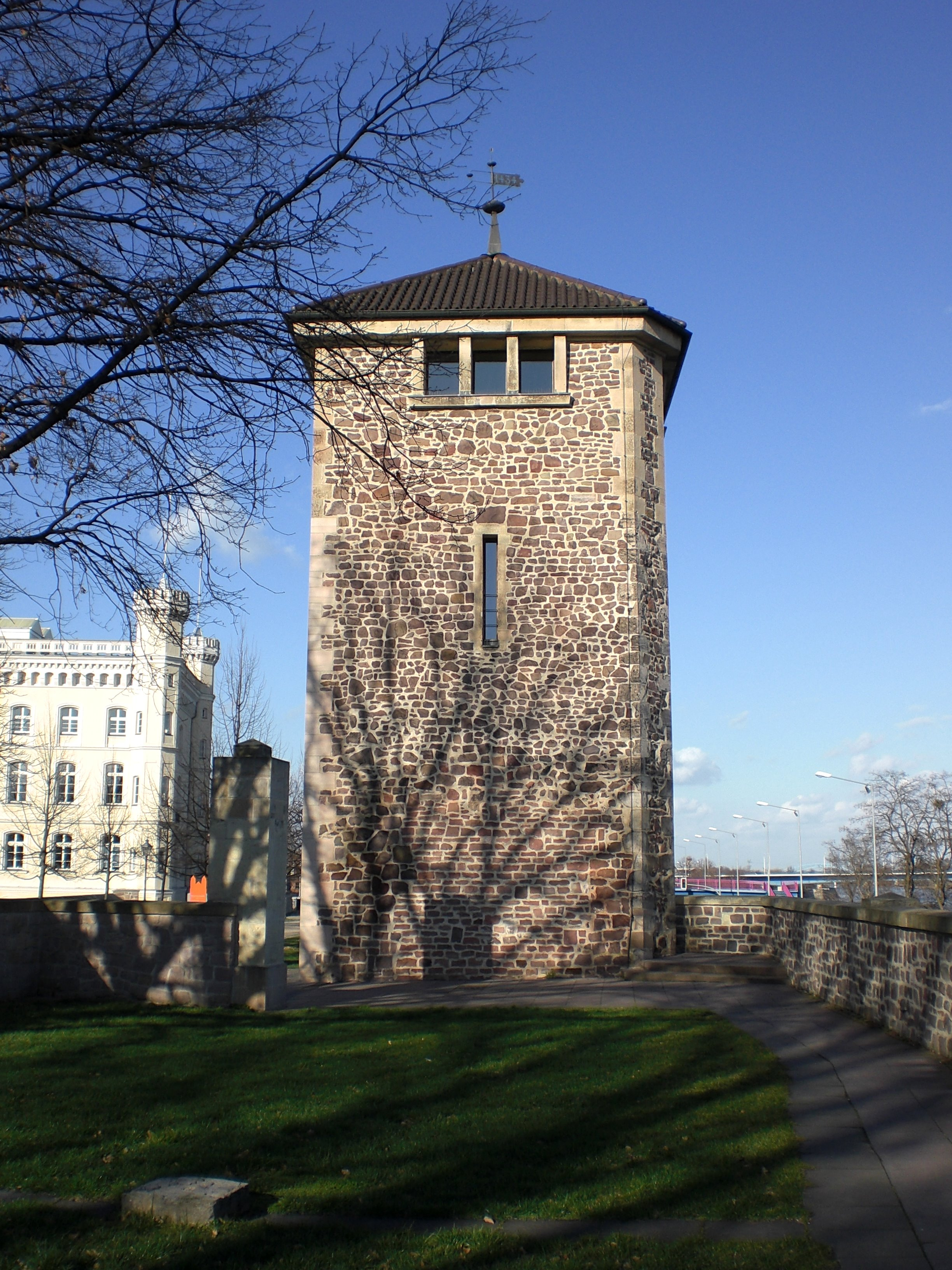
In Magdeburg, Germany

== See also ==
- Kiek in de Mark
