= Boynton (surname) =

Boynton is a surname derived from the village and civil parish of Boynton, East Riding of Yorkshire. Notable people with the surname include:

- Albert E. Boynton (1875–1945), American attorney and politician
- Andrew C. Boynton (born c.1957), American academic administrator
- Benny Boynton (1898–1963), American football player
- Brian Boynton (born 1967), American lawyer
- Bruce Boynton (1937–2020), American civil rights leader
- Charles Albert Boynton (1867–1954), American judge and politician
- Charles B. Boynton (1806–1883), American university president and politician
- Charles F. Boynton (1906–1999), American bishop
- Charles Lawrence Boynton (1864–1943), American botanist
- Craig Boynton (born 1964), American tennis player and coach
- David Boynton (1945–2007), Hawaiian natural historian
- Elayna Boynton, American indie soul singer
- Florence Treadwell Boynton (1876–1962), American educator
- Sir Francis Boynton, 4th Baronet (1677–1739), English landowner and member of parliament
- Frank Boynton (footballer) (1887–1946), Australian rules footballer
- Frank Boynton (golfer) (1936–2024), American professional golfer
- Frank Ellis Boynton (1859 – December 10, 1942), American botanist, brother of Charles Lawrence Boynton
- Graham Boynton, British writer and journalist, father of Lucy Boynton
- Henry V. Boynton (1835–1905), Union Army officer, Medal of Honor recipient
- Jack Boynton (1928–2010), American painter
- James S. Boynton (1833–1902), American politician and jurist
- John Boynton (American football) (born 1946), American football player
- John Boynton (Worcester Polytechnic Institute) (c.1791–1868), American businessman and politician
- John Keyworth Boynton (1918–2007), British legal officer
- John F. Boynton (1811–1890), American Latter Day Saint leader
- Donnie Boynton (born 1976), American songwriter and musician
- Judy Boynton (born 1955), American businesswoman
- Kenny Boynton (born 1991), American basketball player
- Kiley Boynton (born 1998), American acrobatic gymnast
- Li Boynton (born 1991), American investment fund manager
- Louise Boynton (1868–1951), American newspaper publisher and editor
- Lucy Boynton (born 1994), British actress
- L. W. Boynton (1877–1937), American college football player and coach
- Matthew Boynton (c.1591–1647), English landowner and politician
- Melbourne Parker Boynton (1867–1942), American Baptist minister
- Mere Boynton (born 1966), New Zealand singer
- Mike Boynton (born 1982), American basketball player and coach
- Nathan Boynton (1837–1911), American politician from Michigan
- Nick Boynton (born 1979), Canadian ice hockey player
- Peter Boynton (born 1957), American administrator and academic
- Rachel Boynton, American film director
- Ray Boynton (1883–1951), American painter
- Ruth Boynton (1896–1977), American physician
- Sandra Boynton (born 1953), American humorist and children's book author
- Susan Brownlow Boynton (1837–1913), American Civil War folk heroine
- Thomas Boynton (antiquarian) (died 1919), British antiquarian
- Thomas Boynton (MP) (1523–1582), English politician
- Thomas Jefferson Boynton (1838–1871), American judge
- Thomas J. Boynton (politician) (1856–1945), American politician
- Washington W. Boynton (1833–1916), American judge
- William Boynton (1641–1689), English Member of Parliament

== See also ==
- Boynton baronets
- Boyns, surname
