= Chan Yik Hei =

Hong Kong entrepreneur (born 1989)

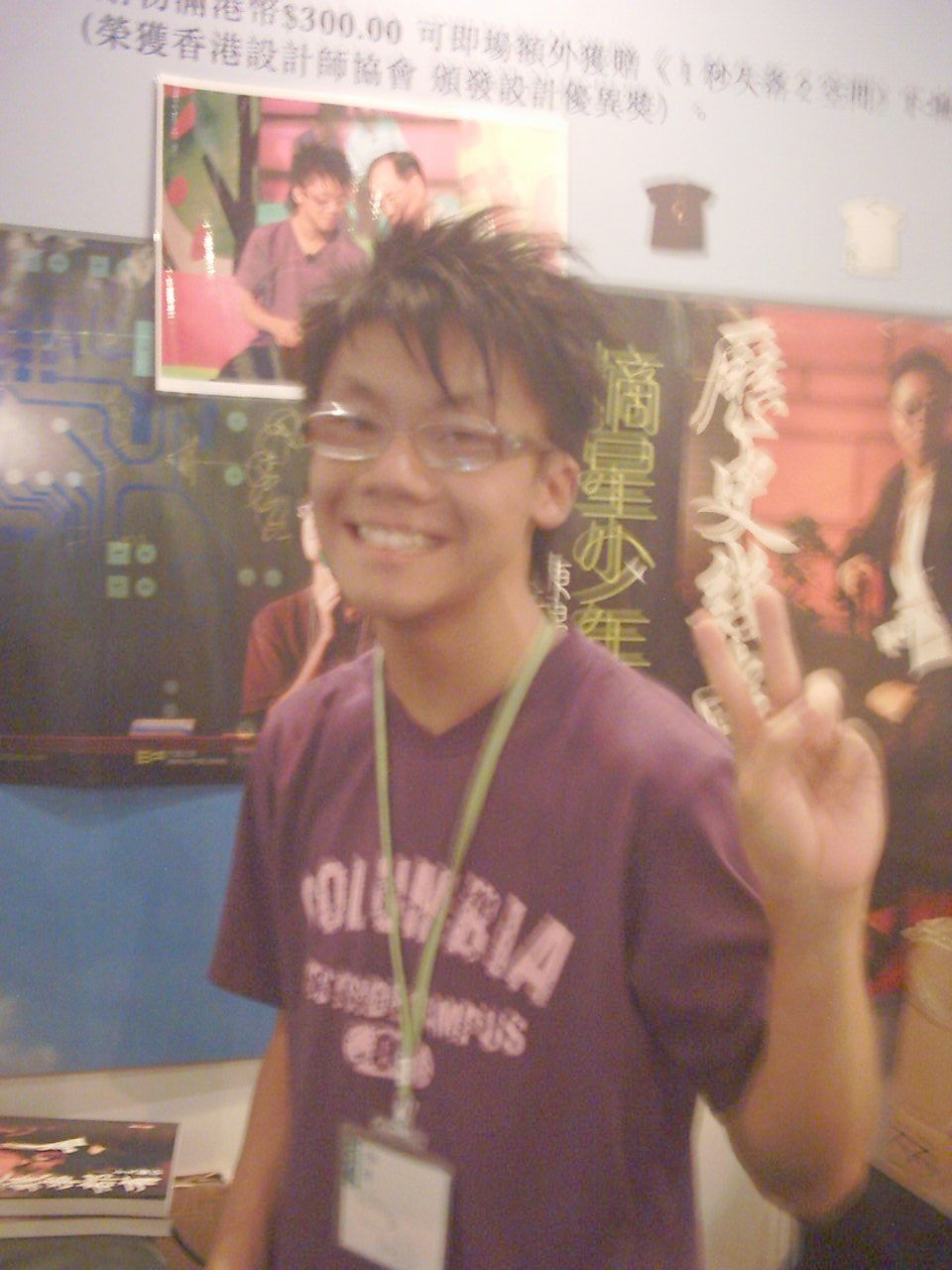
Chan Yik Hei in Hong Kong Bookfair 2006

Chan Yik Hei (born 17 October 1989; Chinese: 陳易希, Jyutping: can4 yik6 hei1) is a young entrepreneur in Hong Kong. He graduated from CCC Tam Lee Lai Fun Memorial Secondary School and Hong Kong University of Science and Technology. Besides, he is also active on editing Chinese Wikipedia.

== Initial fame ==
In 2004, he achieved a Second Award in Engineering Category of the Intel International Science and Engineering Fair for his Total Equip, a robot for domestic security modelled after R2-D2. Therefore, an asteroid, 20780 Chanyikhei, was named after him by LINEAR under the Ceres Connection program, which name asteroids after winners of certain science and engineering competitions.

Back to Hong Kong, he was called "Son of the star" by the local media, and became increasingly famous and popular. A water rocket of his product was launched on the welcoming ceremony for Fei Junlong and Nie Haisheng, the Chinese astronauts of Shenzhou 6.

In May 2006, he was accepted by the Department of Electronics and Computer Engineering of Hong Kong University of Science and Technology (HKUST) for a 4-year undergraduate study (including a 1-year preparatory course), making him a rare case to be accepted into university without completing any public examinations in Hong Kong.

In July 2006, his autobiography Chan Yik Hei, the young man who grabbed the star (Chinese: 摘星少年陳易希) was published, and became one of the bestsellers on the Hong Kong Book Fair. He is also the honourable scholar of the Priority Academy, created by Standard Chartered Bank (Hong Kong).

In November 2013, he gave a speech at TEDxYouth at the Hong Kong Polytechnic University.

== Controversies ==
As he became a celebrity, controversy raised over his admission into HKUST. In August 2006, when he at first refused to announce his HKCEE results, netizens expressed their dislike in local virtual communities like HK Golden Forum, HKEPC, and Miniforum. There was a rumour that he only got 3 grade points in HKCEE, which was proved to be false. It was later announced that he obtained Grade F (Fail) in both Chinese and English, an E in Computer and Information Technology, D in both Mathematics and Chemistry, C in Physics and B in Graphical Communication. In total, he obtained only 12 points, just slightly above the median.

In Oct 2006, he "invented" a cup for the blind, which he named "smart cup" (Chinese: 智能杯). The principle of his "invention" is when the water level reach the two metal strips, the water completes the electric circuit, thus the buzzer sounds to warn the user that the cup is full. The media in Hong Kong said this is a great invention. However, many netizens suggested that he copied the design from a mainland inventor and from an exam project in HKCEE. Chan declared that he had never referred to the design by the mainland inventor.

== Career ==
After graduating from HKUST in 2011, he launched Bull B Tech, a firm that specializes in developing apps for Apple products, with other partners. He was also elected as alumni's representative in the School Management Committee of his former secondary school.

== See also ==
- Education in Hong Kong
- Intel International Science and Engineering Fair

== Notes ==
- Grand Awards of Intel International Science and Engineering Fair
- Chan, Yik Hei (2006). 摘星少年陳易希 [Chan Yik Hei, the young man who grabbed the star] (in Chinese). 天窗出版. p. 74. ISBN 978-988-9910-37-2.
- Winners of the Ceres Connection for 2004
- Introduction to the Ceres Connection program
- 陳易希會考12分 科大預備班惡補語文. Ming Pao (明報) (in Chinese). 22 August 2006.
- (in Chinese) 中五陳易希破格入科大 - His admission to HKUST as reported on Yahoo! News, with his wish for EAS cited.
- 陳易希拒減價「唔合理寧可唔做」. Wen Wei Po (文匯報) (in Chinese). 20 March 2012.
- "政情：星之子變Apps王 掘第一桶金". Oriental Daily (東方日報) (in Chinese). 13 October 2011.
- 政情：陳易希返母校做校董. Oriental Daily (東方日報) (in Chinese). 11 February 2012.
