= 17102 Begzhigitova =

Main-belt asteroid

Discovery
- Discovered by: LINEAR
- Discovery site: Lincoln Lab's ETS
- Discovery date: 10 May 1999

Designations
- Named after: Akmaral Begzhigitova (2003 ISEF awardee)
- Alternative designations: 1999 JB_{41} · 1990 TD_{3} 1995 DN_{3}
- Minor planet category: main-belt · (inner); Flora

Orbital characteristics
- Epoch 4 September 2017 (JD 2458000.5)
- Uncertainty parameter 0
- Observation arc: 25.80 yr (9,425 days)
- Aphelion: 2.5479 AU
- Perihelion: 1.8993 AU
- Semi-major axis: 2.2236 AU
- Eccentricity: 0.1459
- Orbital period (sidereal): 3.32 yr (1,211 days)
- Mean anomaly: 32.465°
- Mean motion: 0° 17^{m} 49.92^{s} / day
- Inclination: 4.2249°
- Longitude of ascending node: 152.89°
- Argument of perihelion: 238.09°

Physical characteristics
- Dimensions: 2.218±0.106 km 2.97 km (calculated)
- Synodic rotation period: 5.341±0.001 h
- Geometric albedo: 0.24 (assumed); 0.393±0.076
- Spectral type: S (assumed)
- Absolute magnitude (H): 14.8 · 14.9 · 15.10±0.31

17102 Begzhigitova (provisional designation 1999 JB_{41}) is a stony Florian asteroid from the inner regions of the asteroid belt, approximately 3 kilometers in diameter. It was discovered on 10 May 1999, by astronomers of the Lincoln Near-Earth Asteroid Research at the Lincoln Laboratory's Experimental Test Site in Socorro, New Mexico, United States. The asteroid was named after Akmaral Begzhigitova, an ISEF awardee of 2003.

== Orbit and classification ==
Begzhigitova is a member of the Flora family (402), a giant asteroid family and the largest family of stony asteroids in the main belt. It orbits the Sun in the inner asteroid belt at a distance of 1.9–2.5 AU once every 3 years and 4 months (1,211 days). Its orbit has an eccentricity of 0.15 and an inclination of 4° with respect to the ecliptic.

The body's observation arc begins with its first identification as 1990 TD_{3} at Palomar Observatory in October 1990, almost 9 years prior to its official discovery observation at Socorro.

== Physical characteristics ==
Begzhigitova is an assumed common S-type asteroid, in agreement with the overall spectral type of the Flora family.

=== Rotation period ===
In February 2008, a rotational lightcurve of Begzhigitova at an apparent magnitude of only 17 was obtained from photometric observations at Modra Observatory in the Czech Republic. Lightcurve analysis gave a rotation period of 5.341 hours with a brightness amplitude of 0.3 magnitude (U=2). However a longer period can not be ruled out.

=== Diameter and albedo ===
According to the survey carried out by the NEOWISE mission of NASA's Wide-field Infrared Survey Explorer, Begzhigitova measures 2.218 kilometers in diameter and its surface has an albedo of 0.393.

The Collaborative Asteroid Lightcurve Link assumes an albedo of 0.24 – derived from 8 Flora, the parent body of the Flora family – and calculates a diameter of 2.97 kilometers based on an absolute magnitude of 14.8.

== Naming ==
This minor planet was named after Akmaral Begzhigitova (born 1985), an Intel International Science and Engineering Fair (ISEF) awardee in 2003. The Ceres Connection program names minor planets in honor of students in fifth through twelfth grades and their teachers. She was awarded 4th place for her mathematics team project. At the time, Begzhigitova attended the Institute of Mathematics, Almaty, Kazakhstan. The official naming citation was published by the Minor Planet Center on 14 June 2004 (M.P.C. 52172).
