= Hotel Icon =

Hotel Icon may refer to:

- Hotel Icon (Houston)
- Hotel Icon (Hong Kong)
