= Kaye Kye-Sung Chon =

South Korean and American academic

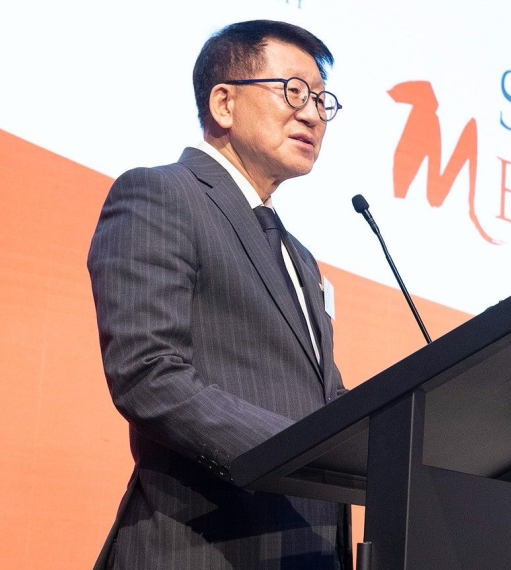
- Kaye Kye-Sung Chon in 2024
- Born: Jeonju, South Korea
- Occupations: Academic, professor, researcher
- Known for: Dean of PolyU SHTM, founding Hotel ICON
- Awards: UNWTO Ulysses Prize (2011), Howard B. Meek Award (2007), John Wiley and Sons Lifetime Research Achievement Award (1994), President's Medal (South Korea), McCool Breakthrough Award (2012, 2017)

Academic background
- Education: Georgia State University (BS); University of Nevada, Las Vegas (MS); Virginia Tech (PhD)
- Doctoral advisors: Michael D. Olsen, Joseph Sirgy

Academic work
- Discipline: Hospitality and tourism management
- Sub-discipline: Tourism marketing, sustainable tourism, hospitality education
- Institutions: The Hong Kong Polytechnic University

Kaye Kye-Sung Chon (Korean: 전계성) is a South Korean and American academic specializing in hospitality management and tourism. He currently serves as Dean and Chair Professor at the School of Hotel and Tourism Management (SHTM) at The Hong Kong Polytechnic University (PolyU), where he also holds the Walter and Wendy Kwok Family Foundation Professorship in International Hospitality Management. Chon is noted for his contributions to hospitality education, including his role in the establishment of Hotel ICON.

== Early life and education ==
Chon was born in Jeonju, South Korea. He received a Bachelor of Science degree from Georgia State University, graduating summa cum laude in 1984. He earned a master's degree from the University of Nevada, Las Vegas (UNLV) in 1985 and completed his PhD at Virginia Tech in 1990, specializing in marketing and consumer behavior in tourism.

== Academic career ==
After his PhD, Chon joined the faculty at Virginia Tech. He later held positions at the UNLV and the University of Houston, where he was Professor and Director of Research and the Tourism Industry Institute at the Conrad N. Hilton College of Hotel and Restaurant Management.

In 2000 Chon became Dean of SHTM at PolyU. At the university, he also holds the Walter and Wendy Kwok Family Foundation Professorship in International Hospitality Management.

Under his leadership, SHTM became an independent school. Chon was involved in the development of Hotel ICON, a teaching and research hotel.

== Awards and honors ==
Chon received the UNWTO Ulysses Prize in 2011 for tourism knowledge creation. In 2007 he was honored with the Howard B. Meek Award.

Other honors include:

- President's Medal, South Korea
- John Wiley and Sons Lifetime Research Achievement Award (1994)
- McCool Breakthrough Award (2012, 2017)

== Selected works ==
- Welcome to Hospitality: An Introduction (Delmar Cengage Learning, 2009)
- Leading the Way: The Story of SHTM and Hotel ICON (School of Hotel and Tourism Management, The Hong Kong Polytechnic University, 2014)
- Hospitality in Asia: A New Paradigm (Routledge, 2019)
- "Assessing the Predictive Validity of Two Methods of Measuring Self-Image Congruence" (with M. Joseph Sirgy, Journal of the Academy of Marketing Science, 1997)
