= Charged Hong Kong =

- Founded: 25 January 2015; Hong Kong SAR
- Type: Non-governmental organisation, Non-profit organisation, Charitable organisation
- Purpose: electric vehicles, Carbon Footprint
- Location: Hong Kong, Hong Kong SAR
- Region served: Worldwide
- Method: Advocacy
- Key people: Mark Webb-Johnson (Chairman); Dr. Phil Kwong (Vice-chairman); Johnny Siu (Secretary); Suresh Khilani (Treasurer); Kelly Chan (Membership); Kristy Lau (Head of Public Relations, PR Group); John Bower (Convenor, Government and Industry Relations Group); Dr. Locky Law (Director of Education, Education Group); Alex Wai (Founding member)
- Website: charged.hk

Charged Hong Kong (also Charged HK or 電動香港 in traditional Chinese) is a registered non-profit organization founded in Hong Kong with an aim to promote clean air. through supporting and accelerating the adoption of electric vehicles. It is a Hong Kong-registered society under #54000 as well as a registered charity under #91/14340.

The current Charged Hong Kong's committee consists of core members of the Tesla Motors Club Forum Hong Kong who organized the Tesla Motors Club Hong Kong Rally 2014.

The charity's Facebook page and website are also main news sources of happenings in the electric vehicle community in Hong Kong and Singapore from which international press and media cite.

== History ==
Charged Hong Kong was founded at a venue in the Hong Kong Gold Coast Yacht and Country Club, where about 70 persons with 25 electric cars met on 25 January 2015. The formal papers were signed to establish Charged HK, with the 5 founders as follows: Mark Webb-Johnson (original chairman), Edwin Lee King-Yan (original vice-chairman), Sony Wong Siu Keung (original treasurer), Core Kåre Lohse (original secretary) and Kristy Lau Kwan Yin (original membership). A competition had been set up to design the future logo of Charged Hong Kong, and the logo submitted by Ricky Sun was selected.

On 15 April 2015, Charged Hong Kong was assigned society registration certificate #54000, and 4 days later, on 19 April 2015, the first Charged Hong Kong meet-up took place. On 29 April 2015, three of the Charged Hong Kong members participated in an internal conference about EVs in the Hong Kong SAR government, being the only representatives of EV owners present. On 14 June 2015, Charged Hong Kong took part in the Electric Vehicle Fiesta 2015. On 5 September 2015, Charged Hong Kong received charitable status, as Hong Kong registered charity #91/14340, and just after that, Charged Hong Kong hosted the first ever National Drive Electric Week outside of North America (12 – 20 September 2015). For more events, see the Events section below.

Charged Hong Kong with its committee, special interest convenors and ordinary members, have participated in many meetings with government representatives, as well as with estate managers and electric companies. Special groups have been set up to focus on various focus areas: Johnny C P Siu is appointed "Convenor, Charging facilities concern group", Suresh Khilani is "Events Coordinator", John Bower is "Convenor, Government and Industry Relations Group". For brand specific groups, only one brand has yet been taken up, as Locky Law is "Tesla Owner Group Representative".

== Tracking Electric Vehicle Development in Hong Kong ==
Charged Hong Kong publishes estimates of electric vehicles by types periodically on its website. Figures have been cited by Forbes and subsequently by other press and media around the globe.

== Events ==
Charged Hong Kong holds events to promote the adoption of electric vehicles. Some of these are listed below.

Motoring Clubs' Festival 2017

On 15 January 2017, Charged Hong Kong participated in Hong Kong's Motoring Clubs' Festival 2017. It was the first charitable organization to have participated in such event showcasing a number of first production EV from several automakers, including Tesla, BMW and Volkswagen.

Charged Hong Kong Rally 2016

On 3 December 2016, Charged Hong Kong organized its second electric vehicle rally with an aim to "showcase the viability of Electric Vehicles as an everyday vehicle to the public", and "educate the public regarding the problems surrounding Air Quality in Hong Kong and how electric vehicles can help". A total of 36 participants and 20 cars each drove 55.9 kilometers starting from Hotel Icon in Tsim Sha Tsui North to Tai Mo Shan lookout then to Beas River Country Club.

Powering Sustainability

On 2 December 2016, 3 Charged Hong Kong members participated in Tesla Motors's Powering Sustainability charity initiative at Elements, Hong Kong. The members drove their Tesla EVs and together with the corporate volunteers to bakery shops and convenience stores across the city, picked up unsold bread and delivered them to various elderly homes, shelters and homeless people. John Bower, Charged Hong Kong's Convenor of Government and Industry Relations Group, appeared in two Facebook Live videos on Social Career's Facebook page while Locky Law, Tesla Owners Representative, appeared on the same page in photo.

FIA Formula E 2016 Hong Kong

On 9 October 2016, Charged Hong Kong was featured on the calendar for season three of the FIA Formula E Championship, subject to FIA track homologation. Chairman Mark Webb-Johnson and Vice-chairman Edwin Lee arrived at the event on a Hotel Icon Tesla Model S limousine and began a series of Facebook Live broadcasting, including a video walkthrough of a Renault Zoe with the Brand Manager of Renault Hong Kong. At the press conference held in October 2015, Charged Hong Kong was offered VIP seats directly behind Leung Chun Ying, the current Chief Executive of Hong Kong and Gregory So, Secretary for Commerce and Economic Development of Hong Kong.

Belilios Public School EV Summer Program

On 14 July 2016, Charged Hong Kong and EV Club Hong Kong co-organized an EV Summer program for Belilios Public School, the first government school for girls in Hong Kong. Held at the Kai Tak Cruise Terminal car park, the event showcased a total of 17 Tesla Model S, 1 Wuzhoulong e-shuttle from Hotel Icon, 1 Renault Kangoo Z.E. and 69 students participated. Locky Law, Charged Hong Kong Tesla Owners Representative and the leading organizer of the event, claims that "This EV summer program is probably the first and largest educational event for schools in Asia, not just teaching students but also allowing them to experience the benefits of electric vehicles." The event was divided in 5 different stations, including Station 1 – (depending on the weather) EV Acceleration & Torque, Station 2 – Hotel ICON eBuses photo-competition, Station 3 – EV Touch & Feel, Station 4 – EV VS ICE Driving Mechanism & Design and Station 5 – Supercharging & EV Charging Standards.

WAVE 2016

In support of WAVE, an event founded by "Solar Pioneer" Louis Palmer which solicits climate commitments from school children in support of the Paris climate summit, Charged Hong Kong visits local schools in Hong Kong with their members' electric vehicles collect climate commitments from students which are sent to United Nations and the leaders of the world. Participating schools include ESF Kennedy School and ESL Clear Water Bay School.

Charged Hong Kong Rally 2015

In November 2015, Charged Hong Kong organized its first electric vehicle rally. A total of 60 participants and 29 cars each drove 40 kilometers starting from Hotel ICON Hong Kong in Tsim Sha Tsui East to Tai Mo Shan then to Hong Kong Science Park.

(National) Drive Electric Week 2015

On 12 September 2015, Charged Hong Kong organized Hong Kong's very first (National) Drive Electric Week. It was held in the form of a treasure hunt game point reward system, in which points are awarded according to the number of public/destination chargers visited and used in the week, EV sales, event sign-ups, as well as introductions and test drives given to members of the public. On Sunday 20 September, a finishing line gathering will take place at Sun Hung Kai center, for participating teams. A total of 10 Tesla Model S, 3 Tesla Roadsters participated in the event. Registered attendees reported that 125,210 electric miles was driven. About 100 test rides have been offered.

Electric Vehicle Fiesta 2015

On 14 June 2015, the charity joined the Electric Vehicle Fiesta 2015 event organized by The Hong Kong Automotive Association and AutoSportsHK held at Lam Tsuen Wishing Tree site in the New Territories and showcased members' electric vehicles at its booth.

== Electric Vehicle Advocacy on Media ==
On 29 May 2015, Charged Hong Kong vice-chairman Edwin Lee appeared on local Hong Kong newspaper Apple Daily describing the performance and environmental-friendliness of his Tesla Model S.

On 29 July 2015, Charged Hong Kong chairman Mark Webb-Johnson appeared in a video interview by Reuters to advocate for electric vehicles in the city. Charged Hong Kong website as well as its non-profit project Best Tesla Model S-friendly Car Park Map were featured in the video.

On 26 October 2015, Charged Hong Kong's Tesla Owners Group Representative Locky Law performed a videoed demonstration of Autopilot features of Tesla Model S in Hong Kong on South China Morning Post.

On 26 November 2015, Charged Hong Kong Secretary Sony Wong and chairman Mark Webb-Johnson appeared in an article by Quartz sharing their views on the importance of EV tax waiver to the sales of EV in Hong Kong as well as the driving behavior of the city's EV owners.

On 30 November 2015, Charged Hong Kong Member Kristy Lau appeared on local television TVB's program titled 時事多面睇 A Closer Look and talked about the benefits of owning electric vehicles.

On 12 December 2015, Charged Hong Kong Secretary Kåre Core Lohse appears on Cathay Pacific employee magazine (November 2015 issue) following a test-drive event he organized at the company in support of Drive Electric Week. His interview is made available in both English and Chinese on the charity's Facebook page.

On 25 January 2016, Charged Hong Kong chairman Mark Webb-Johnson and vice-chairman Edwin Lee were selected to appear in an official video by Tesla Motors and the video was shown at a Tesla Motors Hong Kong customer event in conjunction with the visit by Tesla Motors founder Elon Musk to the city. Another official Tesla Motors video also featured the voice of Charged Hong Kong chairman Mark Webb-Johnson in conversation with Tesla Motors's CEO Elon Musk. Elon Musk coined Hong Kong as the 'Beacon city of electric vehicles' in the same event. Charged Hong Kong member Chan Yik Hei, a young Hong Kong entrepreneur, reviewed in an interview that he had a meeting with both Leung Chun Ying, the current Chief Executive of Hong Kong and Tesla Motors CEO Elon Musk in the same week and had talked about electric vehicles in Hong Kong.

On 28 October 2016, Charged Hong Kong committee member Kristy Lau was in the FIA Formula E Live video, discussing electric vehicles in Hong Kong and her experience driving her Tesla Model S in the "Beacon City of EV", rounding up of this year's FIA Formula E event in Hong Kong.

On 3 November 2016, Tesla President of Global Sales and Services Jon McNeill and Charged Hong Kong chairman Mark Webb-Johnson talked to South China Morning Post SCMP about EV FRT Waiver, Tesla Model X, Model 3, Powerwall and solar roof.

On 26 January 2016, Forbes cited an estimate of 70% market penetration of Tesla Model S in Hong Kong produced by Charged Hong Kong's Tesla Owners Group Representative Locky Law. This figure was then recited by other media such as Quartz, InsideEVs, Marketing Interactive, ecomento and Campaign US.

On 13 February 2016, Charged Hong Kong Facebook page broke the news of Singapore-based Charged Hong Kong associate member Joe Nguyen's importing of a Tesla Model S from Hong Kong to Singapore, making it Singapore's first Tesla Model S and the world's first electric vehicle to be taxed S$15,000 (US$10,900) for carbon emission. Singapore's Land Transport Authority (LTA) issued such a fine based on a test result of 444Wh/km using a United Nations Economic Commission for Europe (UNECE) R101 standards. This news has triggered vast news coverage from both Singapore and on an international level starting from March 2016. On 4 March 2016, Tesla CEO Elon Musk tweeted that he contacted Singapore Prime Minister Lee Hsien Loong and various agencies are investigating. An official statement from Tesla Motors was published on its official website on 10 March 2016 arguing that Joe's Tesla Model S has an energy consumption of 181Wh/km and therefore qualifies for an incentive rather than a fine. In a news report by Channel NewsAsia, Chief of the Information Unit at UNECE Jean Rodriguez said that the Land Transport Authority of Singapore "appears to be the only national regulator to have included power grid emission into the evaluation of electric vehicles’ (EVs) carbon footprint" and that "R101 only specifies the way to measure the energy consumption of the vehicle, or "tank-to-wheel"". Two months after Charged Hong Kong broke the news, Joe Nguyen said in a video interview published on 2 May 2016 that Land Transport Authority has yet to make any contact with him regarding the retest mentioned by the Authority in numerous news reports. Joe Nguyen mentioned that he is also Singapore's first Tesla Roadster owner but was not subjected to similar fine in the past until the Singapore government changed their policy towards electric vehicles, and he does not mind paying taxes three times the price of his Tesla Model S price in order to advocate for electric vehicles for the future generations.

On 13 March 2016, Tesla Motors shared Charged Hong Kong Members Stories – No. 000 Mr. Johnny Siu, Charged Hong Kong's coordinator of Public Charging Group, on their official Facebook page with caption "A great interview by Charged HK"

On 14 March 2016, Forbes was first to report a return of Tesla's Autosteer and Auto Lane Change functions after the Transport Department of Hong Kong had issued the ban on them on 17 November 2015. In the article, Charged Hong Kong's Tesla Owners Group Representative Locky Law talked about the benefits of Tesla Autopilot on the roads of Hong Kong and adding that Tesla's Summon feature was still not approved "due to regulatory restrictions".

On 2 April 2016, Forbes interviewed Charged Hong Kong's Tesla Owners Group Representative Locky Law about the possible impact of Tesla Model 3 on Hong Kong's EV market. Charged Hong Kong member Lydia Lee was also featured in the same article.

On 13 April 2016, following a controversial electric vehicle report produced by an international oil company-investing research firm Bernstein Energy claiming that a yet-to-be-produced Tesla Model 3 in Hong Kong is more polluting than an internal combustion engine vehicle, which triggered global coverage and reciting including Bloomberg and Forbes, Charged Hong Kong chairman Mark Webb-Johnson was invited by local broadcaster RTHK for an on-air debate with the report author. The charity soon produced a letter to the editor which was published on 26 April 2016 on the same local newspaper which had published the research firm's report and addressed the firm's conflict of interests, the report's skewing of data and flaws in calculations

On 26 May 2016, Charged Hong Kong committee member John Bower appeared in an interviewed by The Guardian to talk about the challenges Hong Kong faced in electric vehicle development.

On 20 June 2016, Charged Hong Kong's Tesla Owners Group Representative Locky Law commented on the importance of EV First Registration Tax Waiver to the development of electric vehicles and environmental-friendliness in Hong Kong. Hong Kong was compared to Singapore and China in the same article.

On 1 July 2016, Charged Hong Kong committee member Kristy Lau and Tesla Owners Group Representative Locky Law both commented on the effect on the Tesla owners' confidence in Hong Kong as a result of the first fatality related to Tesla's Autopilot driver assistance feature. They both state that the driver should be in control of the car even when Autopilot is activated.

On 27 July 2016, Charged Hong Kong's Tesla Owners Group Representative Locky Law appeared in an InsideEVs article as the leading organizer of an EV Summer Program for Belilios Public School in Hong Kong, one which he claims to be "probably the first and largest educational event for schools in Asia".

On 5 September 2016, Charged Hong Kong vice-chairman Edwin Lee commented on South China Morning Post stating that he believes some incentives could be provided to plug-in hybrids, but "zero tax" should be left for "zero emissions" vehicles only. He also questioned why plug-in hybrid manufacturers are not stepping up to full electric as it is the future.

On 17 October 2016, Charged Hong Kong Tesla Owners Representative Locky Law voices his concerns in the latest South China Morning Post SCMP article over the installation of audible warning device on EVs as requested by the visually-impaired. He said EV owners "would not oppose to installing a beeper if carmakers sought to use the device to address blind people's concerns," but "the best approach was to conduct joint tests on Hong Kong streets with participation from representatives from blind groups as well as the government, academic experts and automakers to determine what noise standards would be suitable locally."

On 1 November 2016, an extended version of the FIA Formula E video was published on YouTube, featuring Charged Hong Kong committee member Kristy Lau and host Ben Constanduros discussing electric vehicles at some of the most iconic places of the Beacon City of EVs.

On 12 December 2016, Charged Hong Kong Tesla Owners Representative Locky Law spoke to South China Morning Post about the lack of regulations and protection for EV-charging facilities which led to the abuse of EV-charging stations by gasoline vehicles at government and private car parks. He called on the government to educate the public about basic etiquette towards the use of EV-charging facilities.

On 12 January 2017, Charged Hong Kong Tesla Owners Representative Locky Law shares facts and statistics on the effects of air pollution in Hong Kong, as well as the important role EV plays in fighting climate change in his Tesla customer's story.

On 20 January 2017, Charged Hong Kong's chairman Mark Webb-Johnson appeared in a video titled "Hands off the Wheel" by China Daily introducing the autopilot hardware on Tesla Model S and Tesla Model X.

On 24 January 2017, Charged Hong Kong's chairman Mark Webb-Johnson spoke to South China Morning Post SCMP at the Hong Kong Motorist Clubs’ Festival about EVs and some of our achievements in education.

On 22 February 2017, Charged Hong Kong Tesla Owners Representative Locky Law reported to Electrek about the massive cut in EV First Registration Tax waiver in Hong Kong starting 1 April 2017. He foresees that the EV development in the beacon city for electric vehicles will come to an end with this policy much like the case of Denmark. The article also mentioned that Tesla President Jon McNeill's had talks with the local government in November 2016 in order to extend the tax break, which had failed to work.

== See also ==
- Chan Yik Hei
- Electric vehicles
- FIA Formula E Championship
- Louis Palmer
