= Jessica Uhl =

American business executive (born 1968)

Jessica Rodgers Uhl (born January 29, 1968) is an American business executive. She is the former president of GE Vernova, the vice chair of Mission Possible Partnership, an independent director of Goldman Sachs, and a member of the School of International and Public Affairs, Columbia University (SIPA) Center on Global Energy Policy advisory board. She is a former CFO of Shell and serves as a director. She has been recognized as one of the top 50 "Most Powerful Women" by Forbes for her global leadership, and by Fortune for her business leadership.

== Biography ==
Born in 1968 in Walnut Creek, California, Uhl was the youngest of five siblings. She obtained her bachelor's degree in political economy from the University of California, Berkeley in 1989 and completed her MBA at INSEAD in 1997. She is married and has three children.

== Career ==
Uhl started her career in 1990 as a financial analyst at Citibank in San Francisco. Six years later, she left for France to pursue an MBA, after which she joined Enron working on development and acquisition of energy infrastructure projects.

Uhl joined Shell in 2014, later rising to CFO, in The Netherlands and in the UK. In 2016, she became the second woman to be appointed as its CFO, after Judy Boynton (2001–2004). She was in the role for five years, stepping down when the company moved its headquarters to London in 2021. Shell credits her as "a key architect of strategic changes, including the simplification of the company’s share structure and the relocation of the corporate HQ".

In October 2019, she was ranked 24th on Fortune list of Most Powerful International Business Women, and as 35th among "The World’s 100 Most Powerful Women" in 2021 by Forbes.

Nominated in March 2021, Uhl became a non-executive director of Goldman Sachs the following month.

In 2021, she was named to The Global OUTstanding LGBT+ Role Model lists, which showcases the 50 top LGBT+ business leaders in the world. On September 9, 2021, Institutional Investor magazine recognized her as the best CFO in her sector amongst European corporations.

Nominated in March, Uhl joined the board of General Electric in May 2023. In March 2024, Uhl said she would not stand for re-election on the board of Goldman Sachs, in order to focus on her role as president of GE Vernova—an energy company that spun out of GE in April 2024. She would later depart GE Vernova in 2025.
