= Boyne =

Boyne is a variation of Bóinn or Boann, Irish goddess of the River Boyne.

Boyne may also refer to:

== Places ==
- Boyne Castle, a ruined castle in Aberdeenshire, Scotland
- Boyne City, Michigan, a town in Charlevoix County in the U.S. state of Michigan
- Boyne Falls, Michigan, a village in Charlevoix County in the U.S. state of Michigan
- Boyne Island, Queensland, mainland town in Queensland, Australia, on the west bank of the Boyne River
- Boyne River (disambiguation)
- Boyne Valley, Queensland, rural locality in the Gladstone Region of Queensland, Australia, comprising the towns of Builyan, Many Peaks, Nagoorin, and Ubobo
- Boyne Public School, a JK–8 public school in Milton, Ontario, Canada
- Boyne, a name for the headquarters of Zion Christian Church, South Africa

== People ==
- Gil Boyne (1924–2010), American hypnotherapist
- John Boyne (b. 1971), Irish novelist
- Peter Boyne (b. 1944), Australian Rules footballer who played for the Collingwood Football Club
- Walter J. Boyne (1929–2020), U.S. Air Force officer and historian

== See also ==
- Battle of the Boyne, 1690 battle on Irish land, in which the forces of Prince William of Orange defeated those of the deposed King James II of England
- Boyne Mountain Resort, a ski resort in Northern Michigan, United States
- Boyne Resorts, a company that owns and operates ski and golf resorts in the United States
- Brú na Bóinne, valley in County Meath, Ireland, at a bend in the River Boyne
- Boyne-class ship of the line, a class of two 98-gun second rates, ordered in 1783
- HMS Boyne is the name of several ships in the British Royal Navy
- Boyns, surname
