= Boyns =

Boyns is a surname. Notable people with this surname include:

- Cedric Boyns (born 1954), English cricketer
- Trevor Boyns (born 1953), British business historian

== See also ==
- Boyne
- Boynes (surname)
- Boynton (surname)
