= Henry Lin (astronomer) =

American astrophysicist

- Born: 1995 (age 30–31); Shreveport, Louisiana, U.S.
- Education: Harvard University, Princeton University
- Scientific career
- Thesis: Towards the Black Hole Interior (2022)
- Doctoral advisor: Juan Maldacena

Henry Wanjune Lin (born 1995) is an American astrophysicist and assistant professor of physics at Princeton University. As a senior in high school, Lin won the Intel Young Scientist award, the second-highest award at the 2013 Intel Science and Engineering Fair, for his work with MIT professor Michael McDonald on simulations of galaxy clusters. In 2015, he was named one of Forbes' 30 under 30 scientists.

Lin is a 2012 alumnus of the Research Science Institute and a 2013 alumnus of the International Summer School for Young Physicists (ISSYP) at Perimeter Institute for Theoretical Physics. In November 2013, he gave a TED talk on clusters of galaxies in New Orleans, Louisiana.

Together with Harvard astronomy chair Abraham Loeb and atmospheric scientist Gonzalo Gonzalez Abad, Lin proposed a novel way to search for extraterrestrial intelligence by targeting exoplanets with industrial pollution. Lin's work also includes proposing a statistical theory of human population which explains Zipf's law and proposing a novel test for panspermia in the galaxy.

Lin is currently a professor at Princeton University, after having completed his postdoctoral training at Stanford University and receiving his PhD at Princeton University under Juan Maldacena. His dissertation focused on understanding the interior of black holes in quantum gravity.
