= PolyU School of Hotel and Tourism Management =

School in Hong Kong

School of Hotel and Tourism Management
- 酒店及旅遊業管理學院
- Motto: Leading Hospitality and Tourism
- Type: Public
- Established: 1979
- Dean: Professor Kaye Chon
- Academic staff: Over 90
- Students: Over 1,500
- Location: Tsim Sha Tsui East, Kowloon, Hong Kong
- Website: www.polyu.edu.hk/shtm
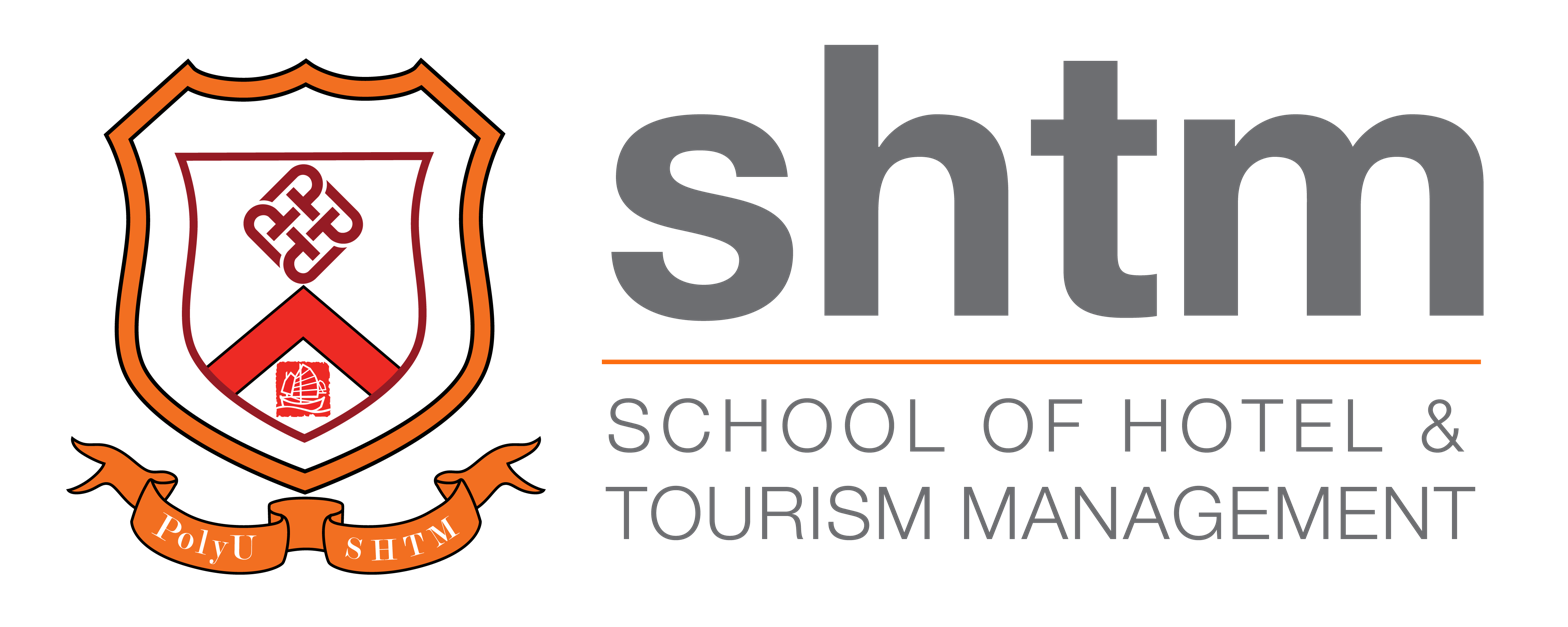

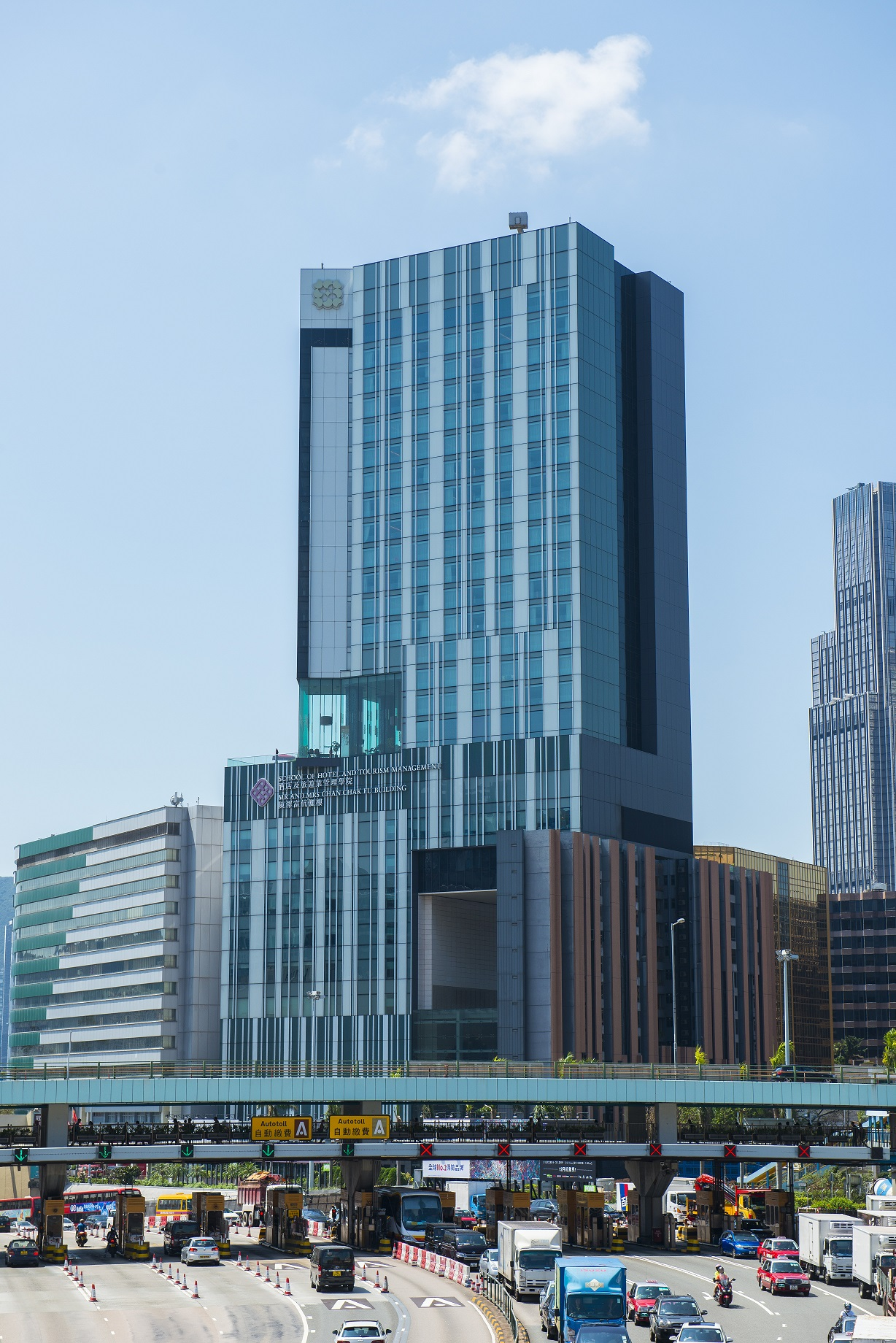
The SHTM & Hotel ICON complex

The School of Hotel and Tourism Management (SHTM) is one of the schools at The Hong Kong Polytechnic University (PolyU). It was established in 1979 as the Department of Institutional Management and Catering Studies, then renamed as Department of Hotel and Tourism Management in 1992. Under the leadership of Dean Kaye Chon, the department was designated a school in October 2001, which became an independent and autonomous academic unit within the university structure in July 2004.

The SHTM offers programmes from undergraduate degrees to doctoral degrees. In 2012, the SHTM received the McCool Breakthrough Award from the International Council on Hotel, Restaurant, and Institutional Education (I-CHRIE) for its teaching and research hotel, Hotel ICON. The School is currently an Affiliate Member of the United Nations World Tourism Organisation (UNWTO).

== Programmes ==
The SHTM offers programmes at levels ranging from Bachelor’s degree to Ph.D. in Hong Kong and Mainland China:

Programmes in Hong Kong

- Doctor of Philosophy (Ph.D.) in Hotel and Tourism Management
- Doctor of Hotel and Tourism Management (D.HTM)
- Master of Science (MSc) in Global Hospitality Business
- MSc Scheme in Hospitality and Tourism Management
  - MSc in Artificial Intelligence in Hospitality
  - MSc in Innovation and Entrepreneurship in Hospitality
  - MSc in International Hospitality Management
  - MSc in International Tourism and Event Management
  - MSc in International Wine Management
  - MSc in Luxury Experiences Management
- MicroMasters in International Hospitality Management (online programme)
- Bachelor of Science (Hons) Scheme in Hotel and Tourism Management

Programmes in Mainland China

- Doctor of Hotel and Tourism Management (D.HTM) (in cooperation with Zhejiang University)
- Master of Science (MSc) in Hotel and Tourism Management (in cooperation with Zhejiang University)

== Facilities ==
Hotel ICON

Officially opened on 21 September 2011, Hotel ICON (唯港薈) is the teaching and research hotel built for the SHTM by PolyU. It was built on the site of Pak Sui Yuen (百粹苑), the former PolyU's staff quarters. Wholly owned by PolyU and an extension of the SHTM, Hotel ICON has a total of 262 guestrooms.

Mr. and Mrs. Chan Chak Fu Building

The building that houses the School was named after the late Mr. and Mrs. Chan Chak Fu, a pioneer Hong Kong hotelier.

Gallery of Honour

Located in the SHTM lobby, the Gallery of Honour displays portraits of the recipients of the SHTM Lifetime Achievement Award. The School established this award to honour individuals who have contributed substantially to the development of hospitality and tourism in Hong Kong, Asia, and the world.

- SHTM Lifetime Achievement Award Recipients
  - 2016 – Mr. Adrian Zecha, Founder of Aman Resorts
  - 2017 – The Honourable Sir Michael Kadoorie, Chairman of The Hong Kong and Shanghai Hotels Limited and Chairman of CLP Holdings Limited
  - 2018 – Thanpuying Chanut Piyaoui, Founder and Honorary Chairman of Dusit International
  - 2019 – Mr. P. R. S. Oberoi, Executive Chairman of EIH Limited, the flagship company of The Oberoi Group
  - 2020 – Mr. Robert H. Burns, Founder of Regent International Hotels
  - 2023 – Dr. Ho Kwon Ping, Founder and Executive Chairman of Banyan Tree Holdings and Laguna Resorts and Hotels
  - 2024 – Mr. Jung-Ho Suh, Chairman of the Ambassador Hotel Group
  - 2025 – Mr. William Heineckie, Founder and Chairman of Minor International PCL

Che-woo Lui Hotel and Tourism Resource Centre

Designed to support the research, teaching and learning functions of the SHTM, the Che-woo Lui Hotel and Tourism Resource Centre is a repository of reference and teaching materials in hotel and tourism management subject areas. It is also equipped with facilities for student discussion, group projects and seminars.

Tan Siu Lin Innovation Hub

The Tan Siu Lin Innovation Hub is one of the teaching and research facilities of the SHTM.

Bistro 1979

Bistro 1979 is a student-operated restaurant providing a restaurant setting for SHTM students to learn and experience the actual food and beverage management and operation. The restaurant has a capacity of 66 people and includes main and exclusive dining areas for its members and guests.

Vinoteca Lab

Vinoteca Lab is a wine lab used for a variety of classes ranging from basic wine fundamentals to advanced regional and international wine knowledge and specialist skills. It also hosts a variety of other classes, including wine appreciation, food and wine pairing, creative mixology, and coffee art, which are open to students, industry executives, and the general public. Workshops organised by the Food and Wine Academy, take place in this lab.

The Food and Wine Academy

The Food and Wine Academy is a joint initiative of the SHTM and Hotel ICON, offering series of short, jointly developed workshops and courses for food and wine enthusiasts, ranging from basic to advanced levels.

The Western Food Production Lab

The Western Food Production Lab allows students to practice and learn about food production, food hygiene and safety. Workshops organised by the Food and Wine Academy also take place here.

== Rankings ==
ShangaiRanking’s Global Ranking of Academic Subjects 2026

The SHTM is ranked No.1 in the “Hospitality and Tourism Management” category in ShangaiRanking’s Global Ranking of Academic Subjects 2026 for ten years in a row.

University Ranking by Academic Performance Research Laboratory

For seven consecutive years, the SHTM has retained the No.1 position in the “Commerce, Management, Tourism and Services” category in the Field Based Ranking produced by University Ranking by Academic Performance Research Laboratory from 2017/18 to 2024/25.

Centre for World University Rankings 2017

The SHTM is ranked No.1 in the “Hospitality, Leisure, Sport and Tourism” category in the Centre for World University Rankings 2017.

QS World University Rankings by Subject 2026

The SHTM ranks No.2 globally among comprehensive universities in the “Hospitality and Leisure Management” subject area in the QS World University Rankings by Subject 2026.

== Research and consultancies ==
Hospitality and Tourism Research Centre

Established as a research-based platform by the SHTM.

Research Centre for Digital Transformation of Tourism

As a constituent unit of the PolyU Academy for Interdisciplinary Research, the Research Centre for Digital Transformation of Tourism pursues research in strategic areas.

The SHTM+ICON Consultancy

SHTM+ICON Consultancy is a business unit under the auspices of the PolyU Technology & Consultancy Co. Ltd., which is a wholly owned subsidiary of PolyU. The services offered include hospitality management, hospitality development, executive education in hospitality and other service industries, and higher education in hospitality.
