= Louis Palmer =

Swiss teacher, innovator, and environmentalist

Louis Palmer (born 1971 in Budapest) is a Swiss keynote speaker and environmental advocate who self-describes as a "Solar Pioneer".

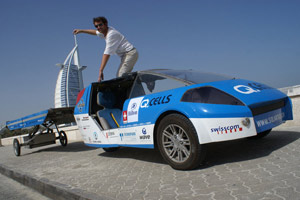
Palmer on the Solartaxi

== Life ==
Louis Palmer was raised in Luzern, Switzerland. Since he was a little child, his dream was to show the benefit of renewable energy sources and solar cars to the world. After finishing school, he became a schoolteacher. After several trips to foreign countries, he discovered his vision and took his first steps into Solar Energy. In 2007 and 2008, he was the first to circumnavigate the globe on solar power.

== Motivational speaker ==
Louis Palmer speaks at conferences around the world about solar energy and the possibility of a better world through renewable energy. His audiences include researchers, politicians, and students. In 2009, Palmer was awarded the European Solar Prize, and in 2011, he was awarded Champion of the Earth award in the Inspiration & Action category for circumnavigating the globe in a solar-powered vehicle.

== Solartaxi ==
In 2004, with the help of sponsors and technical support, Palmer began building a solar-powered car called the Solartaxi. For the technical expertise, he worked together with the Hochschule für Technik und Architektur Luzern and three other Swiss universities. He drove around the world in his Solartaxi between 2007 and 2008, logging over 54,000 kilometers through over 40 counties. In 2008, the tour ended in Luzern after 18 months, making it the first tour around the world in a solar-powered car. During the tour, his companion Erik Schmitt made a documentary film about the tour. In 2009 he was awarded the European Solar Prize for his Solartaxi.

== Zero Race ==
After his Solartaxi tour, Palmer drew from his previous experience when he became the initiator and tour director of an organized race. The Zero Emissions Race took place between August 2010 and February 2011. The aim was to make it around the world in 80 days and to show what emission-free vehicles can accomplish. Palmer invited four teams to enter the competition, under the following criteria for their vehicles: they had to be propelled by an electric motor, they had to be able to drive a minimum of 250 kilometres (160 mi) at a minimum average speed of 80 kilometres per hour (50 mph), they had to be able to achieve a distance of 500 kilometres (310 mi) over the course of a day with a single 4 hour charge break, and they had to be able to carry at least two passengers. Through Zero Emissions Race, Palmer was once again able to draw attention to his vision of sustainable living.

== WAVE World Advanced Vehicle Expedition ==
Palmer's third tour began on 10 September 2011 in Paris and finished on 25 September 2011 in Prague. 25 electric vehicles from eight countries joined his first WAVE across 3,000 km and eight countries. The tour stopped in around 30 cities to demonstrate to the public that electric vehicles are reliable, fun, and powerful. All vehicles had to produce their own electricity from a renewable source such as wind or solar and feed it into the grid. In December, the second WAVE took place in India. Five electric cars joined this tour from Mumbai to Bangalore and back. In 2014, 75 vehicles have already joined the tour, and Palmer set the world record for the largest electric vehicle parade with 481 vehicles, which joined the WAVE at its start in Stuttgart on 31 May 2014. In 2016, Charged Hong Kong helped students get climate commitments which were sent to United Nations and multiple world leaders.

== Switchbus / Switzerland Explorer ==
Together with his wife, Dr. Julianna Priskin, Palmer co-founded the Switzerland Explorer" with the world's first 100% electric tour bus. The aim of Switzerland Explorer is to take groups or individual tourists on sustainable tours around Switzerland. The bus was originally in service for the German army, and then it was converted to electric drive by Design-werk. It can transport up to 16 passengers and has a range of up to 300 km.

== Writings ==
- Verrückt nach dieser Welt: Abenteuer zwischen Himmel und Erde. Delius Klasing Verlag. Bielefeld. 2005. ISBN 978-3-7688-1682-3
