= Jack Andraka =

American inventor and cancer researcher (born 1997)

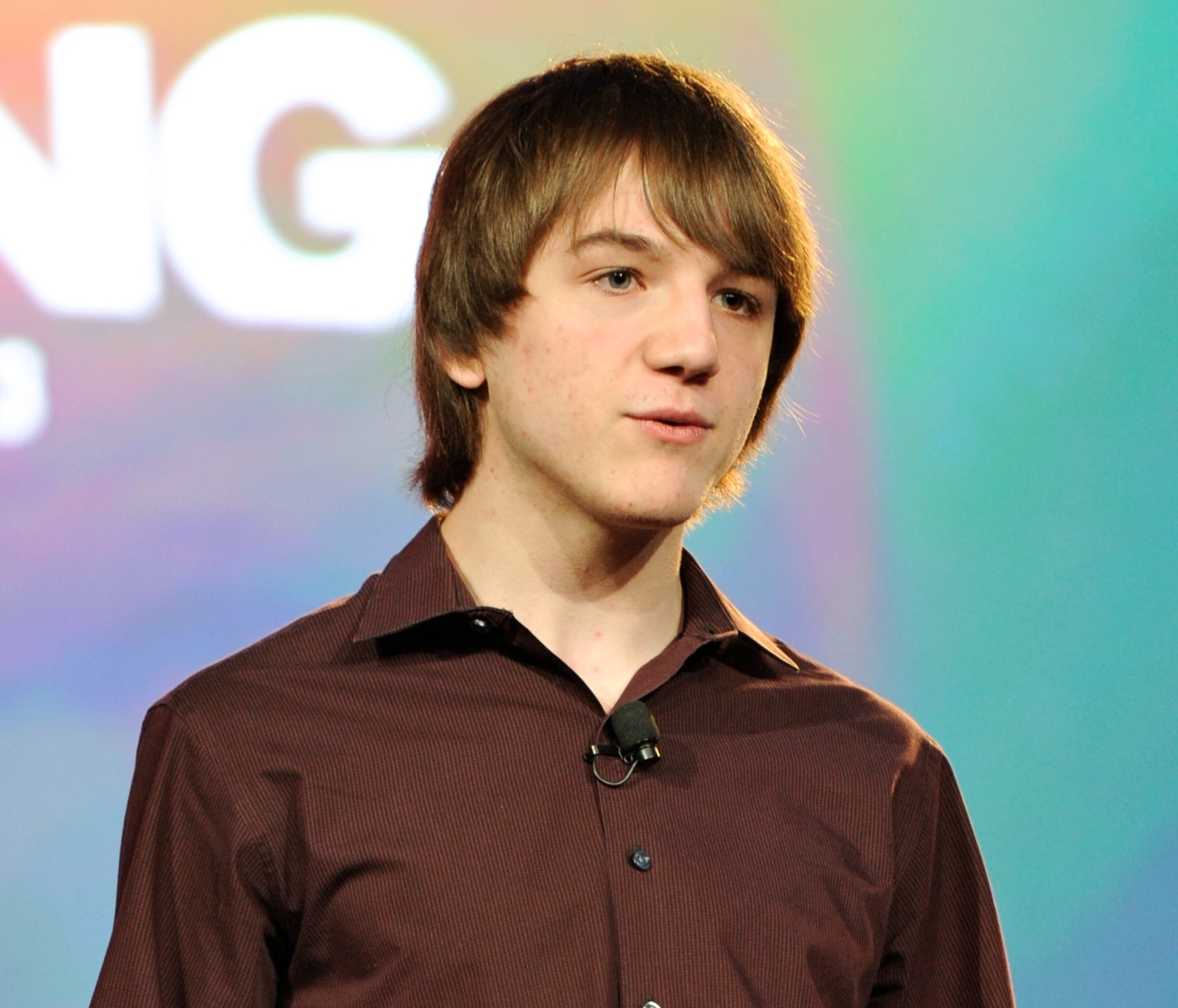
- Andraka in 2013
- Born: Jack Thomas Andraka; January 8, 1997 (age 29); Crownsville, Maryland, U.S.
- Scientific career
- Fields: Cancer research, medical research, invention

Jack Thomas Andraka (born January 8, 1997) is an American who achieved fame in 2012 for having won the Gordon E. Moore Award at the Intel International Science and Engineering Fair that year as a high school student, with a method to possibly detect the early stages of pancreatic and other cancers, the originality and viability of which was subsequently questioned. In 2018, as a junior majoring in anthropology and in electrical engineering at Stanford University, he was awarded the Truman Scholarship for his graduate studies.

== Pancreatic cancer sensor ==
Andraka talks about his work

Andraka's winning project consisted of a sensor, similar to diabetic test strips, for early-stage pancreatic cancer screening. The sensor, consisting of filter paper coated with single-walled carbon nanotubes and antibodies against human mesothelin, was said to measure the level of mesothelin to test for the presence of cancer in a patient.

The project claimed that tests on human blood serum showed a dose-dependent response, and that his method was 168 times faster, 1/26667 times as expensive, and 400 times more sensitive than ELISA, 25% to 50% more accurate than the CA19-9 test, and over 90 percent accurate in detecting the presence of mesothelin. However, several years of trials would be needed to determine whether the new device would be sensitive and specific enough as a screening test for pancreatic cancer.

Andraka in an interview with Francis Collins on open access.

Andraka has spoken about the inspiration for his work, including the death of a family friend, in forums including TEDx Nijmegen in 2013. He conducted his work under the supervision of Anirban Maitra, Professor of Pathology, Oncology, and Chemical and Biomolecular Engineering at Johns Hopkins School of Medicine.

Andraka has applied for a provisional patent for his method of sensing pancreatic cancer and as of 2012 was communicating with companies about developing an over-the-counter test.

In October 2013, Andraka appeared as a guest on The Colbert Report to talk about his work.

Ira Pastan, who discovered mesothelin, said that Andraka's method "makes no scientific sense. I don't know anybody in the scientific community who believes his findings." George M. Church, professor of genetics at Harvard University, also raised concerns about the cost, speed, and sensitivity claims. The novelty of Andraka's work has also been questioned. In 2005, seven years before Andraka won the Intel ISEF, a group of researchers at Jefferson Medical College and the University of Delaware reported a carbon-nanotube based sensor for use in breast cancer diagnostics that uses a methodology nearly identical to Andraka's purportedly novel methodology. In addition, a carbon-nanotube based sensor similar to Andraka's was reported in 2009 by Wang et al., a group of researchers at Jiangnan University and University of Michigan, and a carbon-nanotube based sensor for applications in cancer diagnosis was reported in a 2008 paper by Shao et al. that used a methodology similar to Andraka's. In an explanation for why he was not on the Forbes 30 Under 30 List, Forbes editor Matthew Herper said that he overrode an expert judging panel to keep Andraka off the list was because his work was not published in a peer-reviewed scientific journal and because experts saw holes in his work.

In 2012, Andraka filed a "World Patent" under the Patent Cooperation Treaty, which resulted in a preliminary search to determine patentability. The examination found "a lack of inventive step" and prior art in US Patents 7824925 and 8110369. No subsequent patent has been filed in any of the patent offices under the PCT and a "Code 122" (European Patent not filed) was issued on June 3, 2015.

While being an advocate for open access, he was criticized for not publishing his discovery openly for anyone to use and build upon, and then trying to file a patent for it.

== Personal life ==
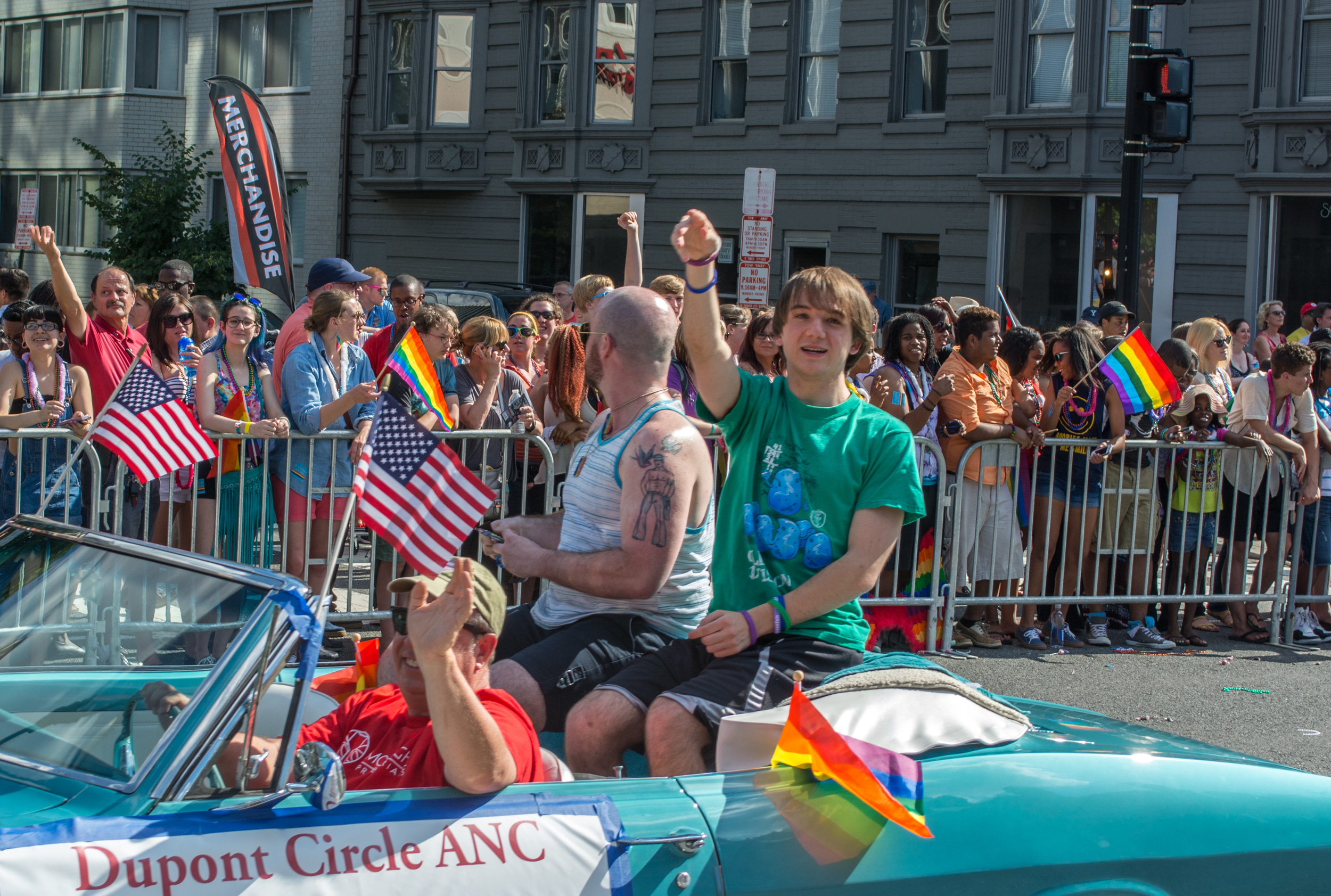
Andraka at Capital Pride in 2014

Jack Andraka was born in Crownsville, Maryland and is of Polish ancestry. Andraka enrolled as a freshman at Stanford University for the 2015–2016 academic year.

Andraka has been openly gay since he was 13. When asked to be interviewed about his sexual orientation, Andraka responded, "That sounds awesome! I'm openly gay and one of my biggest hopes is that I can help inspire other LGBTQ youth to get involved in STEM. I didn't have many role models [who are gay scientists] besides Alan Turing."

=== Family ===
Andraka's father, Steve, is a civil engineer and his mother, Jane, is a Certified Anesthesiology Assistant. Andraka's older brother, Luke, won $96,000 in prizes at the Intel International Science and Engineering Fair in 2010, with a project that examined how acid mine drainage affected the environment. In 2011, Luke won an MIT THINK Award.

== Awards and recognition ==
- 2012 Gordon E. Moore Award
- February 12, 2013, he was one of the guests seated in the First Lady's Box at the State of the Union Address.
- 2013 Intel International Science and Engineering Fair, Fourth-place, Chemistry.
- 2014 National Jefferson Award Recipient, Samuel S. Beard Award for the Greatest Public Service by an Individual Thirty-Five Years or Under
- 2015 Coca-Cola Scholars Foundation Coca-Cola Scholar
- 2012 Smithsonian Magazine American Ingenuity Award

== Publications ==
- Huang, T., Chen, C. Z., Andraka, J., & Heydari, D. (2018). Two-photon lithography for dielectric structures and electroplating molds for retinal prostheses.
