= Boynes (surname) =

Boynes is a surname. Notable people with the surname include:

- Robert Boynes (born 1943), Australian artist
- Winford Boynes (born 1957), American basketball player

== See also ==
- Boyns, surname
- Norbert de Boynes (1870–1954), vicar
