= Eesha Khare =

American inventor

- Born: 1995 (age 30–31); Saratoga, California
- Education: Harvard; University of Cambridge
- Occupation: Inventor

Eesha Khare (born 1995) is an American inventor and was a Young Scientist Award winner in the 2013 Intel International Science and Engineering Fair. She was named one of Forbes' 30 under 30 scientists.

== Biography ==
Khare was born in Saratoga, California, to a hardware engineer and a biologist and attended Lynbrook High School in San José. She went on to earn her SB in Bioengineering at Harvard (2017) and her Master's at University of Cambridge in the U.K. As of 2021, Khare is a PhD student in the Department of Materials Science and Engineering at Massachusetts Institute of Technology (MIT).

In 2013, she was one of 1,600 competitors from 70 countries who submitted projects to the Intel International Science and Engineering Fair in Phoenix. Based on her research, she received monetary awards from the Patent and Trademark Office Society, the American Chemical Society and Intel in the Chemistry category, plus $50,000 as the overall second place co-winner of the Young Scientist Award. Her project described an invention that uses nanotubes to increase the performance of supercapacitors. Her project was also named the California State Science Fair Project of the Year, and Khare was named one of Forbes 30 under 30 in Energy.

According to Bernd Schoene, although news about Khare's science fair invention immediately spread widely in the public and scientific media (including one peer-reviewed paper) saying it would enable a cell phone to be charged in seconds, such an achievement is not yet feasible and Khare's scientific advances, while significant, were exaggerated.

Khare's research at MIT concerns research into climate changes and the ways that mussels bind to rocks along the turbulent shoreline and the metal-coordination bonds that make that possible.
