= Peter Boynton =

American administrator and academic (born 1957)

Peter J. Boynton
- Born: Peter John Boynton; July 5, 1957 (age 69)
- Allegiance: United States
- Branch: United States Coast Guard, retired
- Service years: 1979-2007
- Rank: Captain
- Commands: CO of cutters CAPE MORGAN, OCRACOKE, and ESCANABA; Aviation Drug Interdiction Program at Coast Guard Headquarters; Director for Global Affairs on the National Security Council; Chief of Governmental Affairs for the First Coast Guard District; Captain of the Port and Sector Commander in New Haven
- Awards: Presidential Service Badge; Legion of Merit; Meritorious Service Medal
- Other work: Co-director of The George J. Kostas Institute for Homeland Security at Northeastern University in Boston

Peter J. Boynton (born 1957) is an American administrator, co-director of The George J. Kostas Institute for Homeland Security at Northeastern University in Boston. Boynton most recently served as Commissioner of the Department of Emergency Management and Homeland Security for the state of Connecticut.

Retired United States Coast Guard as well as former Federal Security Director for the Transportation Security Administration at Bradley International Airport, Boynton has been described by former Governor M. Jodi Rell as one of the leaders of America's domestic security effort.

== Background ==
Peter J. Boynton is a 1979 graduate of the United States Coast Guard Academy in New London, where he obtained a bachelor's degree in ocean engineering, and a 1994 graduate of John F. Kennedy School of Government at Harvard University, where he received a master's degree in public administration.

== Career ==
Serving more than 28 years in the United States Coast Guard, Boynton commanded the Coast Guard cutters USCGC Cape Morgan (Cape-class cutter), USCGC Ocracoke, and USCGC Escanaba and managed the Aviation Drug Interdiction Program at Coast Guard Headquarters. He served as Director for Global Affairs on the United States National Security Council from 1995 to 1997, where he coordinated policy for the prevention of drug and migrant smuggling. He was Chief of Operational Planning from July 1999 to July 2001, then Chief of Governmental Affairs for the Boston-based First Coast Guard District from August 2001 to May 2004. Boynton served as Captain of the Port and Sector Commander in New Haven from June 2004 to June 2007, followed by a two-year term as the Federal Security Director for the Transportation Security Administration at Bradley International Airport August 2007-August 2009. During his tenure, Bradley became one of the top 10 rated TSA operations in the eastern United States.

In 2009, Boynton was nominated by former Governor M. Jodi Rell to be the state of Connecticut's next Commissioner of the Department of Emergency Management and Homeland Security (DEMHS).

Of the nomination, Governor Rell said: "Peter's decades of dedicated service to our nation, the many roles he has played in the Coast Guard and his experience at Bradley combine to make him an ideal candidate for the many tasks that befall the Commissioner of the Department of Emergency Management and Homeland Security. From planning and drilling for natural disasters and potential terrorist attacks to working with me to respond to major storms to collaborating with our Congressional delegation and local leaders on issues of homeland security funding, DEMHS is essential to what I have often described as government's foremost responsibility: ensuring the safety of its citizens. Ever since the dark days of September 2001, the Coast Guard has been on the front line of America's domestic security effort–and Peter Boynton has been one of the leaders of that effort. I am tremendously pleased he is willing to take on this new role and I am confident the Legislature will agree."

Boynton was re-appointed by Governor Dan Malloy in early 2011, following a record-breaking winter storm season. As Commissioner of DEMHS, Boynton was responsible for disaster response, and for coordinating planning, communications, training and counter-terrorism efforts in the state. During his tenure, Boynton testified before the U.S. Senate Committee on Homeland Security and Governmental Affairs regarding ongoing planning to prepare for a possible Fall 2009 H1N1 outbreak in the State of Connecticut. He regularly released safety bulletins during severe weather conditions, and is featured in two public service announcements about emergency preparedness.

On September 7, 2011, Boynton announced he would leave his post as Commissioner to take a position leading the new institute on homeland security at Northeastern University. Following the announcement, Gov. Malloy said of Boynton, "I have been continually impressed with his ability to coordinate the state's efforts before, during and after an emergency, his insight and experience, and his ability to stay calm under pressure. Peter will be sorely missed at the EOC, but I have no doubt he will be an invaluable resource for students at Northeastern University."

== Awards and decorations ==
Boynton is licensed in the Merchant Marines. His military awards include the Legion of Merit, Meritorious Service Medal and Presidential Service Badge. He serves on the board of directors for the Military Officers Association of America and is Chair of the Connecticut Maritime Pilot Commission.
