= Boyne River =

Boyne River may refer to:

== Australia ==
- Boyne River (Central Queensland), river to the Coral Sea in Queensland
- Boyne River (Wide Bay–Burnett), tributary of the Burnett River in Queensland
- Boyne Creek (New South Wales), tributary of the Clyde River in New South Wales

== Canada ==
- Boyne River (Manitoba)

=== Ontario ===
- Boyne River (Grey County)
- Boyne River (Muskoka District)
- Boyne River (Nottawasaga River tributary)
- Boyne River (Parry Sound District)

== France ==
- Boyne River (France), a tributary of the Hérault

== Ireland ==
- River Boyne

== United States ==
- Boyne River (Michigan)
