= Melbourne Parker Boynton =

American Baptist minister (1867–1942)

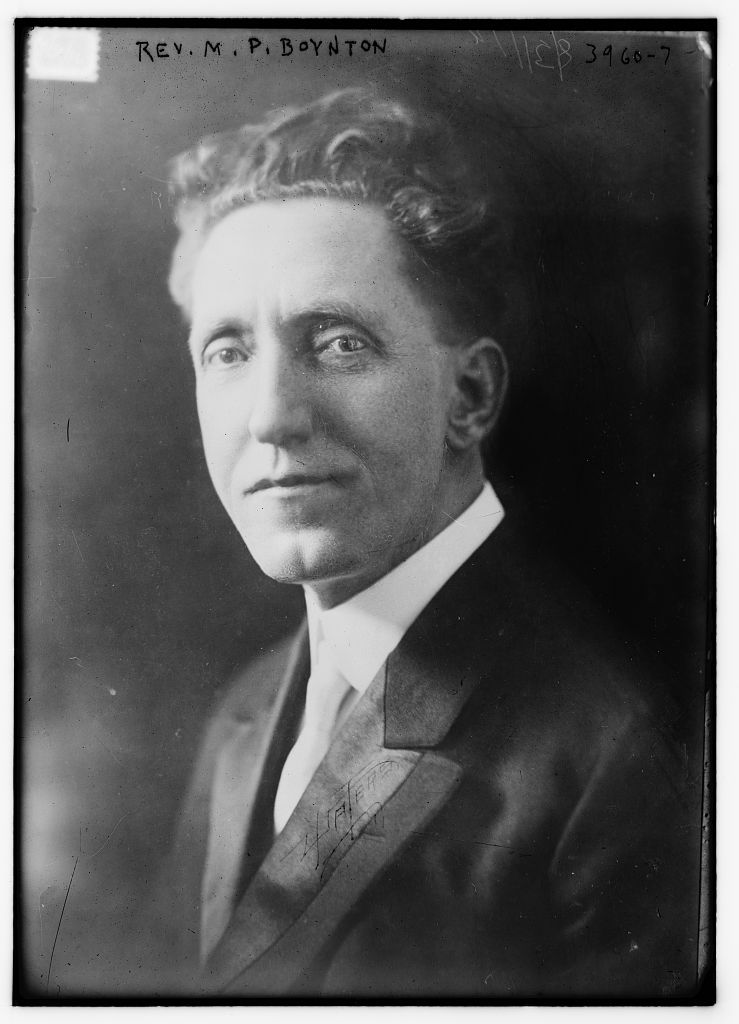

Reverend Melbourne Parker Boynton (November 6, 1867 – June 16, 1942) was secretary of the headquarters committee of the Illinois Anti-Saloon League. In 1916 he was a candidate for congressman in Illinois, but lost to James Robert Mann.

== Biography ==
He was born in Lynn, Massachusetts on November 6, 1867 to Benjamin Skinner and Mary Elizabeth Croscup. He attended the public schools in Massachusetts and New Jersey. He attended American Baptist Seminary of the West in Berkeley, California.

He attended divinity school at the University of Chicago. He married Hattie Wells in San Jose, California on September 8, 1892. He was ordained as a Baptist minister on September 8, 1892 in San Jose, California.

He died on June 16, 1942. He was buried in Mount Hope Cemetery in Shelby Township, Michigan.
