= Li Boynton =

American investment fund manager (born 1991)

Li Sallou Boynton (born October 5, 1991) is an American investment fund manager and former student scientist. Her bioluminescent bacteria-based method for detecting water pollutants won the top award at the 2009 Intel International Science and Engineering Fair. She was profiled in the Texas Tribune, and Houston Chronicle, and sat in the First Lady's box at President Barack Obama’s 2010 State of the Union Address.

She currently is the CEO of Monarch Investment Management, a fund investing in emerging publicly traded biotech companies. In 2024, she joined the board of Fuzionaire Theranostics. She has a bachelor's degree in Molecular, Cellular and Developmental Biology from Yale University. Prior, Boynton was a Vice President & Equity Analyst at JPMorgan. Boynton also worked as an Equity Research Associate at Guggenheim Partners LLC from 2015 to 2016.
