= CCC Tam Lee Lai Fun Memorial Secondary School =

Secondary school in Hong Kong

- 中華基督教會譚李麗芬紀念中學
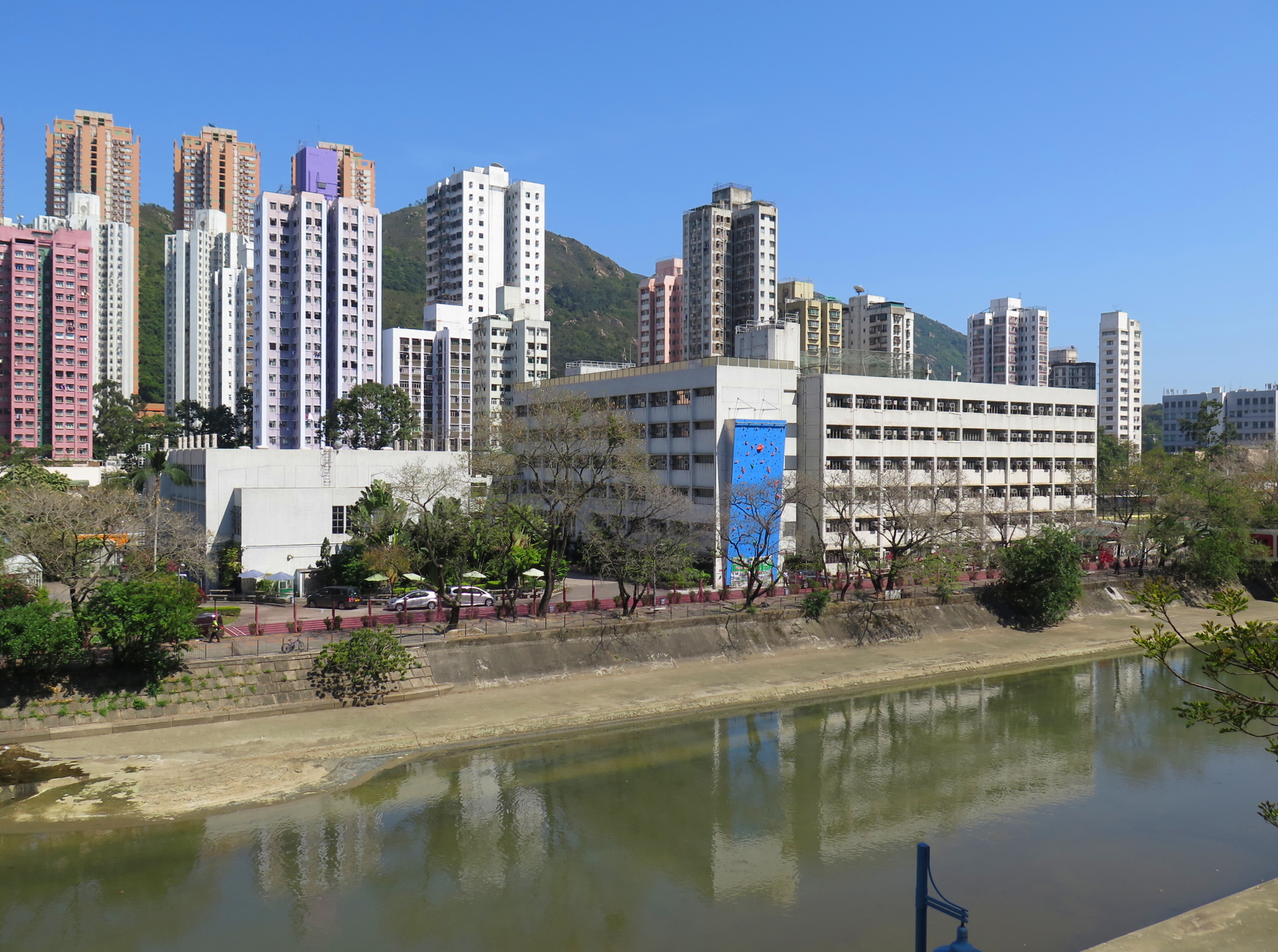
- 10 San Wo Lane, San Hui, New Territories, Hong Kong

Information
- Type: Hong Kong Secondary School
- Motto: Truth, Self-discipline, Diligence and Responsibility
- Religious affiliation: Christianity
- Established: 1990; 36 years ago
- Principal: Ms. Yan Oi Ling
- Teaching staff: 59
- Area: 8000 Square metres
- Affiliation: Hong Kong Council of the Church of Christ in China
- Website: www.tllf.edu.hk

CCC Tam Lee Lai Fun Memorial Secondary School
- Traditional Chinese: 中華基督教會譚李麗芬紀念中學
- Simplified Chinese: 中华基督教会谭李丽芬纪念中学
Transcriptions
Standard Mandarin
- Hanyu Pinyin: Zhōnghuá Jīdūjiào Huì Tán Lǐ Lífēn Jìniàn Zhōngxué
Yue: Cantonese
- Jyutping: zung1 waa4 gei1 duk1 gaau3 wui6*2 taam4 lei5 lai6 fan1 gei2 nim6 zung1 hok6

The Church of Christ in China Tam Lee Lai Fun Memorial Secondary School (中華基督教會譚李麗芬紀念中學), is a Christian secondary school in Tuen Mun of Hong Kong near Light Rail Affluence stop. Located at San Wo Lane, the school is founded by The Hong Kong Council of the Church of Christ in China. The school hosts a student body of approximately 830, aged 12 to 20, with 63 teachers.

== Visions ==
Inspire one's potential and establish one's goal in life by adhering God's spirit.
Train themselves to distinguish between right and wrong and ability to have self-esteem and self-respect.
Build up their relationship between others and enrich themselves with lifelong learning.
Become a good citizen by contributing to the society.

== School facilities ==
1. Air-Conditioned fixed classrooms
2. Liberal Studies Learning Centre
3. Computer Laboratories
4. Information Technology Rooms
5. Multimedia Learning Centre
6. Computer Rooms
7. Chemistry Labs
8. Physics Rooms
9. Biology Rooms
10. Parents Resource Centre
11. Environment Resource Centre
12. Gyms
13. Wall-climbing facilities
14. Greenhouse
15. Organic Farming Laboratories
16. Observatory Station
17. Simulated Military Training Field
18. Eco Lake

== Courses provided ==
- Junior Classes (Form 1–3)

1. Chinese
2. English Language
3. Mathematics
4. Liberal Studies
5. History
6. General Computing
7. General Science
8. Design and Technology
9. Visualized communications
10. Music
11. Physical Education
12. Religion(Christian)
13. Business, Accounting and Financial Studies

- Senior Classes (Form 4–6)

1. Chinese
2. English Language
3. Mathematics
4. Liberal Studies
5. Integrated Science(Biology+Chemistry)
6. Integrated Science(Biology+Physics)
7. Chemistry
8. Physics
9. Biology
10. Economy
11. Business, Accounting and Financial Studies
12. Information and Communication Technology
13. Travel and Hospitality
14. Physical Education(Elective)
15. Visual Arts
16. Religion(Christian)
17. Physical Education

== Links ==
- 中華基督教會譚李麗芬紀念中學
- 敢追夢就是譚李麗芬(Facebook)
- 敢追夢就是譚李麗芬(Instagram)
- 𝐓𝐋𝐋𝐅 𝐃𝐀𝐍𝐂𝐄 𝐂𝐋𝐔𝐁
- ᴛʟʟғ sᴘᴏʀᴛs ᴄʟᴜʙ
- TLLF Volunteer Team
- TLLF LIFE PLANNING(升學就業活動資訊)
- Live@tllf
- 譚李麗芬家長教師會
