= Trevor Boyns =

British business historian

Trevor Boyns (born 1953) is a British business historian and Professor of Accounting & Business History at the Cardiff University, known for his work in the field of the history of accountancy and business history.

== Biography ==
Boyns obtained his first class degree in mathematics and economics in 1974 from the University of Warwick, and his PhD in econometric history in 1982 from the University of Wales with the thesis, entitled "Labour productivity in the British coal industry, 1874-1913."

Boyns spends his academic career at the Cardiff University, where he started in 1976 as tutorial fellow. In 1978 he was appointed lecturer, in 1997 senior lecturer and in 2004 Professor of Accounting & Business History. Nowadays in 2014 he is also Director of Undergraduate Programmes for Economics. He initially focussed his research on the economic and business history of the British coal industry, particularly about the South Wales Coalfield but in the 1990s started focussing his research on the history of accountancy.

Boyns has been President of the Association of Business Historians, and founding editor or the Accounting, Business & Financial History.

== Selected publications ==
- Trevor Boyns, Malcolm Anderson, J. R. Edwards (eds.). British Cost Accounting, 1887-1952: Contemporary Essays from the Accounting literature. 1996/2014
- Boyns, Trevor, John Richard Edwards, and Marc Nikitin. The birth of industrial accounting in France and Britain. Taylor & Francis, 1997/2013.
- Trevor Boyns, J. R. Edwards. A History of Management Accounting: The British Experience. 2012.

Articles, a selection:

- Edwards, John Richard, and Trevor Boyns. "Industrial organization and accounting innovation: charcoal ironmaking in England 1690–1783." Management Accounting Research 3.2 (1992): 151–169.
- Edwards, John Richard, Trevor Boyns, and Malcolm Anderson. "British cost accounting development: continuity and change." The Accounting Historians Journal (1995): 1-41.
- Boyns, Trevor, and John Richard Edwards. "The development of accounting in mid-nineteenth century Britain: a non-disciplinary view." Accounting, Auditing & Accountability Journal 9.3 (1996): 40–60.
- Boyns, Trevor, and John Richard Edwards. "Cost and management accounting in early Victorian Britain: a Chandleresque analysis?." Management Accounting Research 8.1 (1997): 19–46.
- Boyns, Trevor, and John Richard Edwards. "The Construction of Cost Accounting Systems in Britain to 1900: The Case of the Coal, Iron and Steel Industries 1." Business History 39.3 (1997): 1-29.
- Boyns, Trevor, and John Richard Edwards. "The development of cost and management accounting in Britain." Handbooks of Management Accounting Research 2 (2006): 969–1034.
