= Hotel Icon (Houston) =

Hotel in Downtown Houston

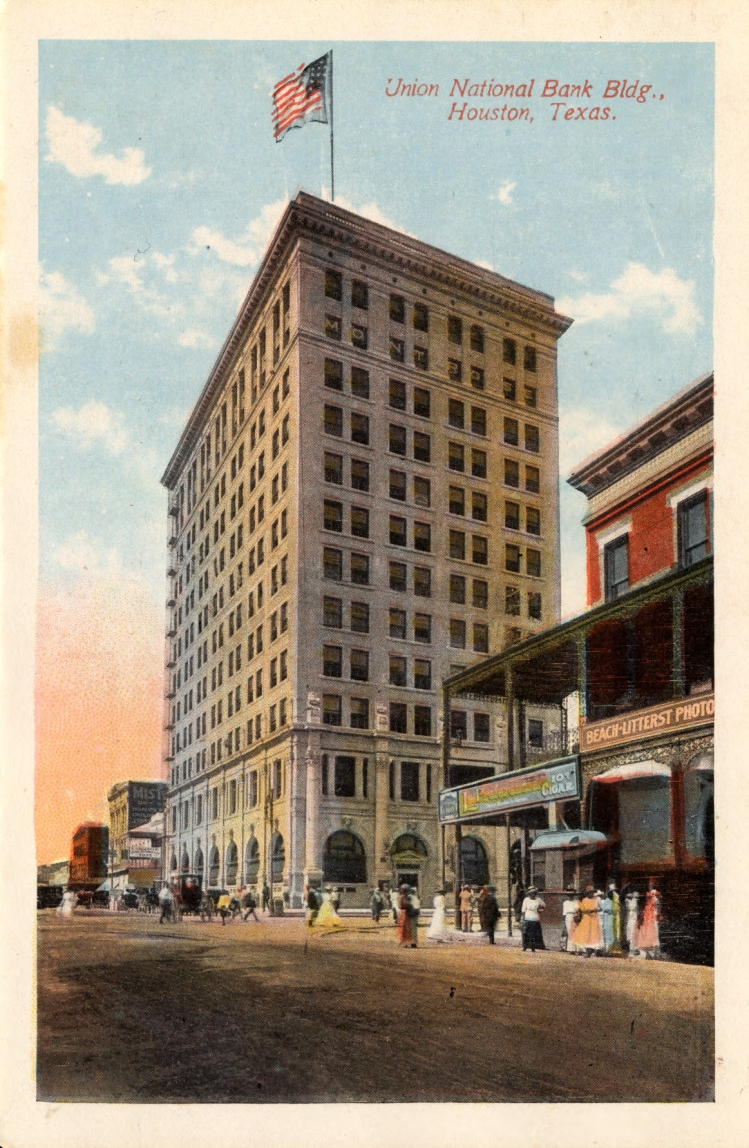
- Union National Bank 1912-1924

- Location within Texas

General information
- Location: 220 Main, Houston, Texas, United States
- Coordinates: 29°45.745′N 95°21.648′W

Technical details
- Floor count: 12

Other information
- Number of rooms: 135
- Number of suites: 9
- Number of restaurants: 1
- Parking: Valet Parking/Garage

Website
- hotelicon.com

Hotel ICON is a boutique hotel located in downtown Houston, Texas, USA. The building was originally built for the Union National Bank.

== History ==
The Union National Bank was the renaming of the Union Bank & Trust Company after it acquired Merchant's National Bank in 1908. The bank's first president was Jonas Shearn Rice, nephew of William Marsh Rice and brother of Horace Baldwin Rice. The bank was capitalized in 1908 with 1 million dollars.

The building housing the present-day Hotel ICON was originally built as the Union National Bank Building, opened in 1912. Jesse H. Jones, the most influential developer and retail banker in early-twentieth-century Houston, contracted with the St. Louis architectural firm of Mauran, Russell & Crowell to design and build a skyscraper to house the bank. The twelve-story concrete building was set on a two-story limestone base, with very detailed ornament on the Main Street facade. Columns, architraves, and carved heads in the likeness of Mercury decorated the bays on the Main Street side of the building. The upper floors were clad with dark bricks and decorated with piers and pilasters.

The Union National Bank Building featured modern conveniences such as an air conditioning system and three elevators. Initially subdivided into 396 offices, its notable early tenants included Harrie Lindeberg and John Staub.

By 1955, the Union National Bank Building was renamed as the Continental Building. After Continental National Bank vacated the building in 1970, Pan Am National Bank acquired the building, but few tenants remained in 1973. Leasing in 1975 leasing of offices closed, and all of the upper floors were closed of through 2000.

== Renovation ==
The hotel is part of Marriott International's Autograph Collection Hotels. Located in the former Union National Bank building that was constructed in 1911, the hotel was designed by San Francisco design firm Candra Scott & Anderson at the cost of $35 million. The 12-story hotel features 135 guest rooms and nine individually designed signature suites that include custom-designed period furnishings and décor with original artwork.

== Transportation ==
The hotel offers a private car within downtown and a PediaCab within a short distance. Taxi service is available. The hotel is adjacent to METRORail's Preston Station which provides light rail service to the Houston Museum District, the Texas Medical Center, Rice University, Hermann Park, the Texas Medical Center, NRG Center and NRG Stadium. The hotel is within driving distance to the Uptown area.

== See also ==
- Yule marble
