= Judy Boynton =

American businesswoman (born 1955)

Judith Gubala Boynton (born January 1955) was the first woman chief financial officer of Royal Dutch Shell from 2001. She was dismissed in 2004 following a scandal about the reporting of the company's reserves.
