= Ceres Connection =

Cooperative program between MIT Lincoln Laboratory and Society for Science

The Ceres Connection is a cooperative program between MIT's Lincoln Laboratory and the Society for Science and the Public dedicated to promoting science education. It names asteroids discovered under the LINEAR project after teachers and contesting students who performed outstandingly in the following Society for Science and the Public competitions: the Discovery Channel Young Scientist Challenge, the Intel Science Talent Search, the Intel International Science and Engineering Fair.

Since 2001, nearly 200 asteroids are named each year through this program.

== See also ==
- Naming of asteroids
- Lincoln Near-Earth Asteroid Research
- Society for Science and the Public
