= International Science and Engineering Fair =

Annual science fair in the U.S.

- Country: United States
- Website: www.societyforscience.org/isef/

The Regeneron International Science and Engineering Fair (ISEF) is an annual science fair held in the United States. It is widely regarded as the most prestigious pre-university scientific and engineering research competition in the world. It is owned and administered by the Society for Science, a 501(c)(3) non-profit organization based in Washington, D.C.

Each year, an estimated 7 million students from 75 countries participate in affiliated local, regional, and national science fairs that serve as feeders to ISEF, with roughly 1,800 finalists (about 0.03%) advancing to the international competition. Each May, finalists compete in the fair for scholarships, tuition grants, internships, scientific field trips and the grand prizes, including one $100,000 and two $75,000 college scholarships. All prizes together amount to over $9,000,000. Two major awards ceremonies are the Special Awards Organization Presentation and the Grand Awards Ceremony.

== History ==
The International Science and Engineering Fair was founded in 1950 by Science Service (now the Society for Science) and was sponsored by Intel from 1997 to 2019.

Regeneron Pharmaceuticals became the title sponsor for ISEF in 2020, but the event was cancelled that year and replaced with an online version due to the COVID-19 pandemic. The 2021 ISEF was a fully virtual event while 2022 was held online and in-person in Atlanta, GA, and 2023 was in person in Dallas, TX. The 2024 ISEF was held in person in Los Angeles, CA, the 2025 ISEF in Columbus, OH, and the 2026 in Phoenix, AZ. The 2027 ISEF will be held in Los Angeles, CA.

== Contestants and competition ==
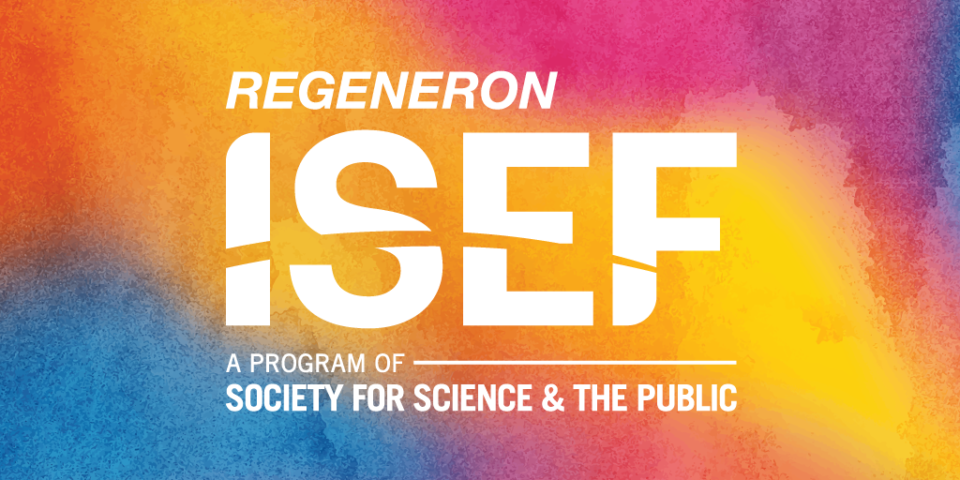
Regeneron International Science and Engineering Fair logo

Contestants are selected from regional, district, and state ISEF affiliated fairs. These fairs usually encompass multiple states or entire regions of a country. The regional fair committee is responsible for managing the fair when their city hosts the event.

Individual science projects and team science projects both compete for prizes. Teams are composed of two to as many as four high school students (grades 9–12). In addition to the judging of projects and an open session for the public to view them, there is time set aside for students to experience the host city with tours and activities. A significant component of the program is social, as students interact with each other during mixers and ceremonies. Throughout much of the week, various seminars are also held for students, mentors and teachers.

Projects and judging are divided into 22 subject categories.

== Prizes and honors ==
- George Yancopoulos Innovator Award: $100,000 scholarship, given to the top of the Best of Category Award winners, selected on the basis of innovative research and potential of the project to have an impact in the particular field and the world as a whole.
- Regeneron Young Scientist Awards: $75,000 awards presented by Regeneron and SSP to two Best in Category projects. Previous winners include Henry Lin and Eesha Khare.
- The Gordon E. Moore Award for Positive Outcomes for Future Generations: In recognition of Gordon E. Moore's continued legacy of honoring the best at the International Science and Engineering Fair, the Gordon and Betty Moore Foundation is providing the $50,000 for the award.
- Dudley R. Herschbach SIYSS Award: all expense trip paid trip to the Stockholm International Youth Science Seminar, and during Nobel Prize week.
- Craig R. Barrett Award for Innovation: A $10,000 award given to the finalist who best demonstrates an innovation in Science, Technology, Engineering and Math, recognizing that research and innovation are dependent on the integration of these disciplines, as well as the impact they collectively have on our everyday lives
- H. Robert Horvitz Prize for Fundamental Research: $10,000 is given to the project that represents the best in fundamental research that furthers our understanding of science and/or mathematics and promotes the understanding of natural phenomena without clearly defined applications towards processes or products in mind.
- Peggy Scripps Award for Science Communication: A $10,000 award honoring Peggy Scripps who was a science journalist who served as a writer and editor of Science Newsletter for many years. This award is given to the finalist who is best able to communicate their project to the lay public, explaining both the science and its potential impact on society.
- EU Contest for Young Scientists Award: an all-expense-paid trip enables attendance at the European Union Contest for Young Scientists located in a new city each year.

ISEF used to hold a "People's Choice Award" to allow the public to vote for its favorite entries.

Since 2001, MIT's Lincoln Laboratory has named asteroids after ISEF winners as part of the Ceres Connection.

Multiple organizations sponsor 'special awards' with their own distinct criteria. These organizations include the National Security Agency, Association for Computing Machinery, IEEE Foundation, and Patent and Trademark Office Society.

=== Finalist Medal ===
Finalist of the Regeneron ISEF
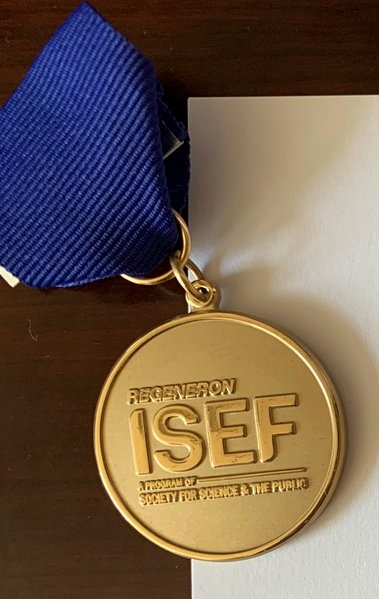
- ISEF finalist medal

Awarded by Society for Science and Regeneron
- Type: medal award
- Established: 1950
- Country: held United States but an international competition
- Ribbon: blue and yellow
- Motto: "Future Forward"
- Eligibility: Participate in an affiliated fair and be selected (criteria varies by fair)
- Status: ISEF
- Founder: Gordon E. Moore
- Grades: George Yancopoulos Innovator Award; Regeneron Young Scientist Award; Regeneron ISEF Best of Category Awards; Regeneron ISEF Grand Awards; Regeneron ISEF Special Awards; Regeneron ISEF Experiential Awards; Dudley R. Herschbach SIYSS Award; Regeneron ISEF Gordon E. Moore Award for Positive Outcomes for Future Generations; Regeneron ISEF Craig R. Barrett Award for Innovation; Regeneron ISEF H. Robert Horvitz Prize for Fundamental Research; Regeneron ISEF Peggy Scripps Award for Science Communication

Statistics
- First induction: 1950

Precedence
- Next (lower): Varies, depending on rank
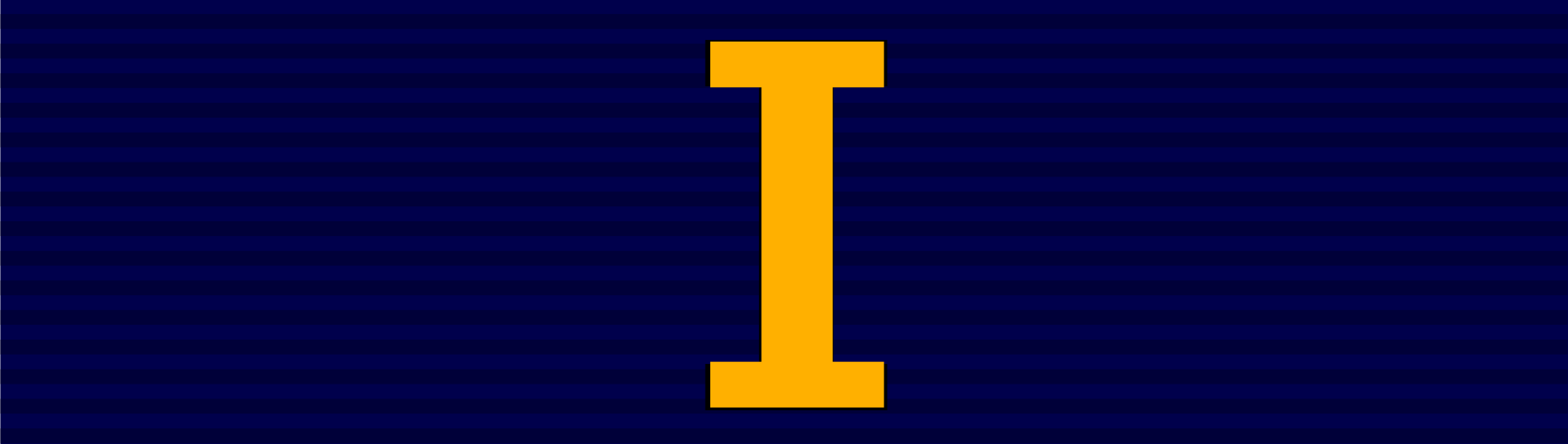
- Finalist Medal (gold with blue ribbon)

The Regeneron ISEF Finalist Medal is given to about 1800 students from 75 countries each year, which are participating at the Regeneron International Science and Engineering Fair, which is owned and administered by the Society for Science, a 501(c)(3) non-profit organization based in Washington, D.C. In 2013 there were 1611 finalists at the Intel ISEF in Phoenix, Arizona.

The medal has a diameter of 48 mm and is golden galvanized. The obverse shows the official logo of the Regeneron ISEF, the reverse shows the year of participation and the location of that year's Regeneron ISEF.

The ribbon bar is blue with a width of 40 mm and has a golden romanic 1 in the middle.

== Notable alumni ==
ISEF alumni include:

- Richard Zare (1957): American chemist who won the National Medal of Science in 1983
- James Gunn (1957): Astronomer and MacArthur Fellow who won the National Medal of Science in 2008
- John Clauser (1959 & 1960): American theoretical and experimental physicist who won the Nobel Prize in Physics in 2022
- Paul Modrich (1964): American biochemist who won the Nobel Prize in Chemistry in 2015
- Roderic I. Pettigrew (1967): Founding director of the National Institute of Biomedical Imaging and Bioengineering at the National Institutes of Health
- Susan Solomon (1972): Atmospheric chemist who won the National Medal of Science in 1999
- Kristina M. Johnson (1975): SUNY Chancellor
- Dianne Newman (1987): Microbiologist
- Vamsi Mootha (1989): Mitochondrial biologist 2004 MacArthur Fellow
- Feng Zhang (2000): CRISPR researcher
- Lester Mackey (2003): Computer Scientist, 2023 MacArthur Fellow
- Alexandria Ocasio-Cortez (2007): United States Congresswoman

== Top prize winners ==
When Intel began sponsoring ISEF in 1997, the Grand Awards were replaced with the Intel Foundation Young Scientist Awards, awarded to the top three projects. In 2010, the top award was renamed for Intel co-founder Gordon E. Moore.

ISEF 1997 (Louisville, Kentucky)

- Intel Foundation Young Scientist Awards
  - Scott Nicholas Sanders (Coral Springs, FL)
  - Logan Joseph Kleinwaks (Reston, VA)
  - Karen Mendelson (Worcester, MA)

ISEF 1998 (Fort Worth, Texas)

- Intel Foundation Young Scientist Awards
  - James Warner Lawler (Greenwich, CT)
  - Jonathan Adam Kelner (Old Westbury, NY)
  - Geoffrey Robert Schmidt (Little Rock, AR)
- Pinnacle Awards
  - Chad Ganske, Amit Barman and Jonathan Haines (Winchester, VA)
  - Heather Matthews and Twila Paterson (Colorado Springs, CO)

ISEF 1999 (Philadelphia, Pennsylvania)

- Intel Foundation Young Scientist Awards
  - Jennifer Lynn Pelka (Orlando, FL)
  - Nisha Nagarkatti (Blacksburg, VA)
  - Feng Zhang (Des Moines, IA)

ISEF 2000 (Detroit, Michigan)

- Intel Foundation Young Scientist Awards
  - Nazanin Jouei (Coral Springs, FL)
  - Karen Kay Powell (Fort Pierce, FL)
  - Jason L. Douglas (Milford, OH)

ISEF 2001 (San Jose, California)

- Intel Foundation Young Scientist Awards
  - Ryan Randall Patterson (Grand Junction, CO)
  - Monika Paroder (Brooklyn, NY)
  - Francis Boulva (Town of Mount-Royal, Canada)

ISEF 2002 (Louisville, Kentucky)

- Intel Foundation Young Scientist Awards
  - Naveen Neil Sinha (Los Alamos, NM)
  - Alexander C. Mittal (Cos Cob, CT)
  - Nina Vasan (Vienna, WV)

ISEF 2003 (Cleveland, Ohio)

- Intel Foundation Young Scientist Awards
  - Lisa Doreen Glukhovsky (New Milford, CT)
  - Elena Leah Glassman (Pipersville, PA)
  - Anila Madiraju (Brossard, Canada)

ISEF 2004 (Portland, Oregon)

- Intel Foundation Young Scientist Awards
  - Sarah Rose Langberg (Fort Myers, FL)
  - Uwe Treske (Grafenhainichen, Germany)
  - Yuanchen Zhu (Shanghai, China)

ISEF 2005 (Phoenix, Arizona)

- Intel Foundation Young Scientist Awards
  - Gabrielle Alyce Gianelli (Orlando, FL)
  - Stephen Schulz (Gelsenkirchen, Germany)
  - Ameen Abdulrasool (Chicago, IL)

ISEF 2006 (Indianapolis, Indiana)

- Intel Foundation Young Scientist Awards
  - Hannah Louise Wolf (Allentown, PA)
  - Madhavi Pulakat Gavini (Starkville, MS)
  - Meredith Ann MacGregor (Boulder, CO)

ISEF 2007 (Albuquerque, New Mexico)

- Intel Foundation Young Scientist Awards
  - Dayan Li (Greenbelt, MD)
  - Philip Vidal Streich (Platteville, WI)
  - Dmitry Vaintrob (Eugene, OR)

ISEF 2008 (Atlanta, Georgia)

- Intel Foundation Young Scientist Awards
  - Sana Raoof (Muttontown, NY)
  - Natalie Saranga Omattage (Cleveland, MS)
  - Yi-Han Su (Taipei, Taiwan)

ISEF 2009 (Reno, Nevada)

- Intel Foundation Young Scientist Awards
  - Tara Adiseshan (Charlottesville, VA)
  - Li Boynton (Houston, TX)
  - Olivia Schwob (Boston, MA)

ISEF 2010 (San Jose, California)

- Gordon E. Moore Award: Amy Chyao (Richardson, TX)
- Young Scientist Award: Kevin Ellis (Vancouver, WA)
- Young Scientist Award: Yale Fan (Beaverton, OR)

ISEF 2011 (Los Angeles, California)

- Gordon E. Moore Award: Matthew Feddersen and Blake Marggraff (Lafayette, CA)
- Young Scientist Award: Pornwasu Pongtheerawan, Arada Sungkanit and Tanpitcha Phongchaipaiboon (Suratthani, Thailand)
- Young Scientist Award: Taylor Wilson (Reno, NV)

ISEF 2012 (Pittsburgh, Pennsylvania)

- Gordon E. Moore Award: Jack Thomas Andraka (Glen Burnie, MD)
- Young Scientist Award: Nicholas Benjamin Schiefer (Ontario, Canada)
- Young Scientist Award: Ari Misha Dyckovsky (Sterling, VA)

ISEF 2013 (Phoenix, Arizona)

- Gordon E. Moore Award: Ionut Budisteanu (Ramnicu Valcea, Romania)
- Young Scientist Award: Eesha Khare (Saratoga, CA)
- Young Scientist Award: Henry Lin (Shreveport, LA)

ISEF 2014 (Los Angeles, California)

- Gordon E. Moore Award: Nathan Han (Boston, MA)
- Young Scientist Award: Lennart Kleinwort (Wurzburg, Germany)
- Young Scientist Award: Shannon Winjing Lee (Singapore)

ISEF 2015 (Pittsburgh, Pennsylvania)

- Gordon E. Moore Award: Raymond Wang (Vancouver, Canada)
- Young Scientist Award: Nicole Ticea (Vancouver, Canada)
- Young Scientist Award: Karan Jerath (Friendswood, TX)

ISEF 2016 (Phoenix, Arizona)

- Gordon E. Moore Award: Han Jie (Austin) Wang (Vancouver, Canada)
- Young Scientist Award: Syamantak Payra (Friendswood, TX)
- Young Scientist Award: Kathy Liu (Salt Lake City, UT)

ISEF 2017 (Los Angeles, California)

- Gordon E. Moore Award: Ivo Zell (Hessen, Germany)
- Young Scientist Award: Valerio Pagliarino (Castelnuovo Calcea, Italy)
- Young Scientist Award: Amber Yang (Windermere, FL)

ISEF 2018 (Pittsburgh, Pennsylvania)

- Gordon E. Moore Award: Oliver Nicholls (Sydney, Australia)
- Young Scientist Award: Meghana Bollimpalli (Little Rock, AR)
- Young Scientist Award: Dhruvik Parikh (Bothell, WA)

ISEF 2019 (Phoenix, Arizona)

- Gordon E. Moore Award: Krithik Ramesh (Greenwood Village, CO)
- Young Scientist Award: Allison Sihan Jia (San Jose, CA)
- Young Scientist Award: Rachel Seevers (Lexington, KY)
- Craig R. Barrett Award for Innovation : Shriya Reddy (Northville, MI)

ISEF 2020 (Anaheim, California)

- Cancelled due to the COVID-19 pandemic and replaced with a virtual fair. Because some qualifier events did not name winners, the fair was not judged and prizes were not awarded.

ISEF 2021 (VIRTUAL) "Regeneron ISEF 2021". September 13, 2023.

- George D. Yancopoulos Innovator Award: Michelle Hua (Troy, MI)
- Young Scientist Award: Catherine Kim (Jericho, NY)
- Young Scientist Award: Daniel Shen (Cary, NC)
- Gordon E. Moore Award for Positive Outcomes for Future Generations: John Benedict Estrada (Fresno, CA)
- Craig R. Barrett Award for Innovation: Arya Tschand (Marlboro, NJ)
- H. Robert Horvitz Prize for Fundamental Research: Neha Mani (Bronx, NY)
- Peggy Scripps Award for Science Communication: Franklin Wang (Palo Alto, CA)

ISEF 2022 (Atlanta, Georgia) "Regeneron ISEF 2022". 13 May 2022.

- George D. Yancopoulos Innovator Award: Robert Sansone (Fort Pierce, FL)
- Young Scientist Award: Rishab Jain (Portland, OR)
- Young Scientist Award: Abdullah Al-Ghamdi (Dammam, Saudi Arabia)
- Gordon E. Moore Award for Positive Outcomes for Future Generations: Chris Tidtijumreonpon, Napassorn Litchiowong & Wattanapong Uttayota (Chiang Mai, Thailand)
- Craig R. Barrett Award for Innovation: Amon Schumann (Berlin, Germany)
- H. Robert Horvitz Prize for Fundamental Research: Rebecca Cho (Jericho, NY)
- Peggy Scripps Award for Science Communication: Anika Puri (Chappaqua, NY)

ISEF 2023 (Dallas, Texas) "Regeneron ISEF 2023". 19 May 2023.

- George D. Yancopoulos Innovator Award: Kaitlyn Wang (San José, CA)
- Young Scientist Award: Saathvik Kannan (Columbia, MO)
- Young Scientist Award: Teepakorn Keawumdee, Pannathorn Siri, & Poon Trakultagmun (Bangkok, Thailand)
- Gordon E. Moore Award for Positive Outcomes for Future Generations: Natasha Kulviwat (Jericho, NY)
- Craig R. Barrett Award for Innovation: Yuyang Wang (Shanghai, China)
- H. Robert Horvitz Prize for Fundamental Research: Rishabh Ranjan & Gopalaniruddh Tadinada (Louisville, KY)
- Peggy Scripps Award for Science Communication: Eugene Chen (Shanghai, China)

ISEF 2024 (Los Angeles, California) "Regeneron ISEF 2024". 19 May 2024.

- George D. Yancopoulos Innovator Award: Grace Sun (Lexington, KY)
- Gordon E. Moore Award for Positive Outcomes for Future Generations: Justin Huang, Victoria Ou (The Woodlands, TX)
- Craig R. Barrett Award for Innovation: Ingrid Chan (The Peak, Hong Kong)
- Young Scientist Award: Michelle Wei (San Jose, CA)
- H. Robert Horvitz Prize for Fundamental Research: Tanishka Aglave (Dover, FL)
- Peggy Scripps Award for Science Communication: Maddux Springer (Honolulu, HI)

ISEF 2025 (Columbus, Ohio) "Regeneron ISEF 2025". 16 May 2025.

- George D. Yancopoulos Innovator Award: Adam Kovalcik (Nitra, Slovakia)
- Young Scientist Award: Benjamin Davis (Attleboro, MA)
- Young Scientist Award: Siyaa Poddar (Chandler, AZ)
- Gordon E. Moore Award for Positive Outcomes for Future Generations: Chanyoung Kim, Eeshaan Dev Prashanth, and Samuel Skotnikov (Flower Mound, TX)
- Craig R. Barrett Award for Innovation: XinYan Chen (Shanghai, China)
- Mary Sue Coleman Award: Uma Sthanu (Austin, TX)
- H. Robert Horvitz Prize for Fundamental Research: Aleksandra Petkova (Sofia, Bulgaria)
- Peggy Scripps Award for Science Communication: Cory Seelenfreund (New Rochelle, NY)

ISEF 2026 (Phoenix, Arizona) "Regeneron ISEF 2026". 15 May 2026.

- George D. Yancopoulos Innovator Award: Hikaru Kuribayashi (Hokkaido, Japan)
- Young Scientist Award: Lakshmi Agrawal (Bellevue, WA)
- Young Scientist Award: Nikola Veselinov (Sofia, Bulgaria)
- Gordon E. Moore Award for Positive Outcomes for Future Generations: Evan Budz (Burlington, ON)
- F. Thomson Leighton and Bonnie Berger Family Prize for STEM Excellence (New Award for the 2026 Fair): Anusha Arora (Bellevue, WA)
- Craig R. Barrett Award for Innovation: Kevin Sun (Andover, MA)
- Mary Sue Coleman Award: Evan Morris (St. Paul, MN)
- H. Robert Horvitz Prize for Fundamental Research: Illaria Liedtke (Rye, NY)
- Peggy Scripps Award for Science Communication: Aakash Manaswi (Orlando, FL)

== See also ==
The Society for Science also administers two other science competitions:

- The Regeneron Science Talent Search, previously sponsored by Westinghouse and Intel.
- The Thermo Fisher Scientific Junior Innovators Challenge, previously known as Broadcom MASTERS ("Math, Applied Science, Technology, & Engineering for Rising Stars").
