= Hotel Icon (Hong Kong) =

Coordinates: 22°18′03″N 114°10′47″E

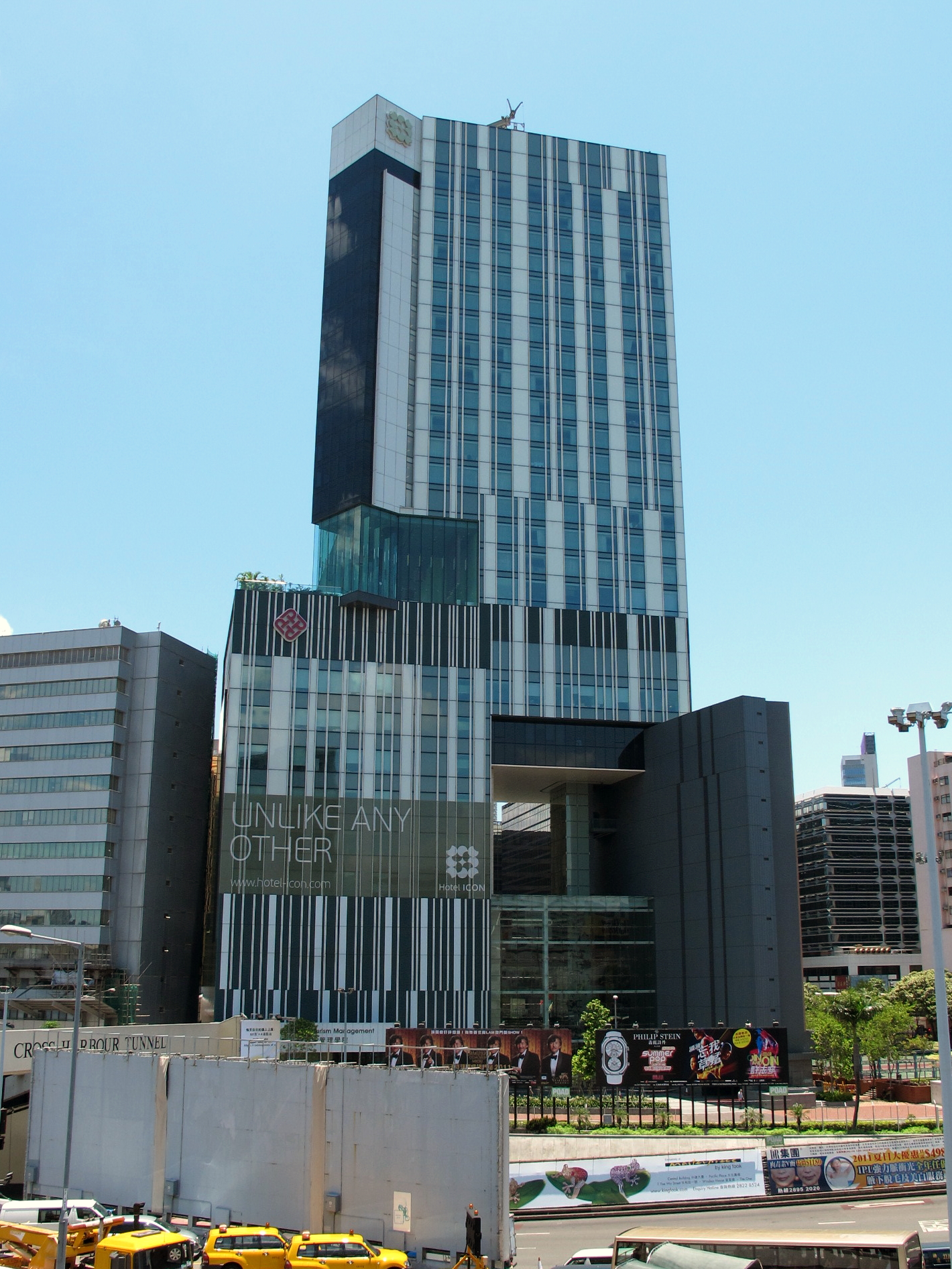
- Hotel ICON in 2011
- Interactive map of the Hotel Icon area

General information
- Location: 17 Science Museum Road, Tsim Sha Tsui East; Hong Kong
- Opening: 21 September 2011; 14 years ago
- Owner: The Hong Kong Polytechnic University
- Operator: The Hong Kong Polytechnic University

Technical details
- Floor count: 28

Other information
- Number of rooms: 262
- Number of suites: 26
- Number of restaurants: 3

Website
- hotel-icon.com

Hotel Icon
- Traditional Chinese: 唯港薈
- Simplified Chinese: 唯港荟
Transcriptions
Standard Mandarin
- Hanyu Pinyin: Wéigǎnghuì
Yue: Cantonese
- Jyutping: wai4 gong2 wui6

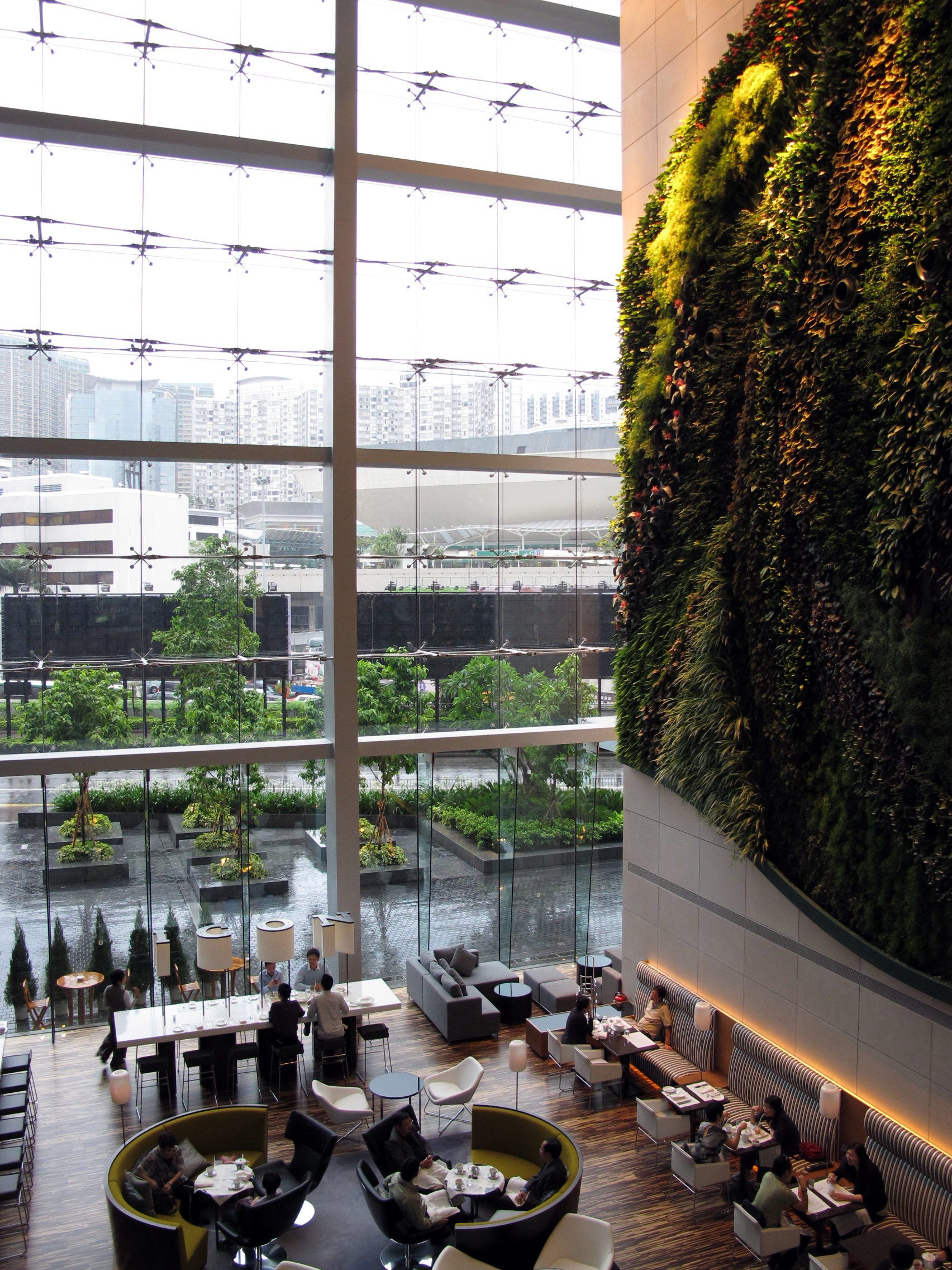
Green wall

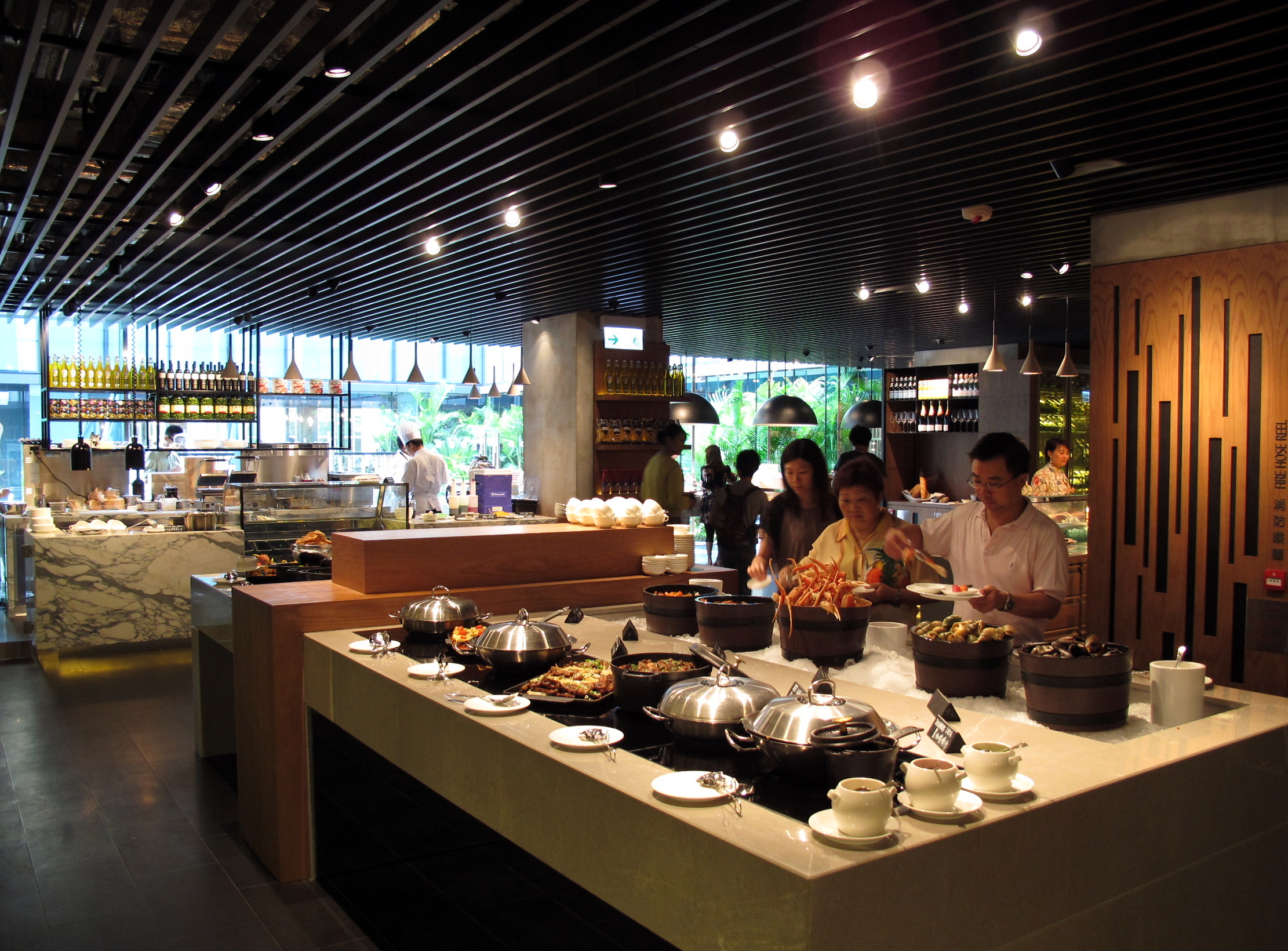
The Market restaurant

Hotel ICON (Chinese: 唯港薈) is the teaching and research hotel built for the School of Hotel and Tourism Management by the Hong Kong Polytechnic University. It is fully owned by the university.

Located at 17 Science Museum Road, Tsim Sha Tsui East, Kowloon, Hong Kong, the hotel was built on the site of what was formerly PolyU's staff quarters, Pak Sui Yuen (百粹苑). The new complex retains the original function of staff quarters, and adds new functions such as hotel rooms, a teaching complex and function rooms. The building's topping-up ceremony was held on 11 March 2010, and the hotel was officially opened on 21 September 2011.

== Design ==
The hotel's architectural design was performed by Hong Kong–based Rocco Design Architects Ltd., which was awarded the 2011 Hong Kong Institute of Architects Medal of the Year of Hong Kong for this work. Hong Kong's CL3 Architects designed the interiors, including the guestrooms, the Silverbox ballroom and the lobby's grand staircase. Vivienne Tam, a Hong Kong Polytechnic University graduate, designed ICON's Designer Suite by Vivienne Tam, an 80m^{2} suite located on the 27th floor. Hong Kong designer Barney Cheng fashioned the staff uniforms. The hotel's logo was created by graphic designer Tommy Li, also a graduate of Hong Kong Polytechnic University.

Conran & Partners designed Hotel Icon's restaurants. French botanist and artist Patrick Blanc created and installed the 18-meter, 230m^{2} green wall in the Hotel Icon lobby.

Hong Kong designer Freeman Lau curated the hotel's collection. At the time of its opening, Hotel Icon was housing works of art by Asian artists, including Cheung Yee, Kan Tai-Keung, Nancy Chu Woo, Hung Keung, Pauline Lam, William Furniss, John Fung, Chow Chun Fai, Tsang Chui Mei and Terence Lee.

== Facilities ==
Hotel Icon has 262 guestrooms, ranging in size from 36 to 80 m^{2}. They include 165 rooms, 68 Above & Beyond Club rooms, 26 suites and 3 prototype rooms. Apart from the guestrooms, there is a ballroom and convention centre, three restaurants, event and exhibition space, as well as a health club and fitness centre.

The three restaurants are:

- Above & Beyond, located on the top floor of the hotel. It serves Cantonese cuisine.
- The Market, located on the second floor. The open-plan restaurant features open kitchens and can accommodate up to 160 diners.
- GREEN, a casual brasserie and bar situated on the lobby level.

== Teaching hotel ==
The hotel is operating under the mandate to benefit the hotel industry through experimentation and research and offer training to SHTM students. Students have the opportunity to participate in structured internship programs. The school occupies nine floors, of which four floors connect to the hotel.

== Awards ==
- 2013 UNWTO Ulysses Award for Innovation in Enterprises
- 2015 - 2025 Four-star Rating by Forbes Travel Guide
- 2025 One MICHELIN Key by MICHELIN GUIDE 2025

== See also ==
- Hyatt Regency Hong Kong, Sha Tin, a hotel connected to the Chinese University of Hong Kong
- Institute for Tourism Studies
