= Eric Walter Elst =

Belgian astronomer (1936–2022)

Eric Walter Elst (30 November 1936 – 2 January 2022) was a Belgian astronomer at the Royal Observatory of Belgium in Uccle and a prolific discoverer of asteroids. As of 2026, the Minor Planet Center ranks him among the top 15 discoverers of minor planets with thousands of discoveries made at ESO's La Silla Observatory in northern Chile and at the Rozhen Observatory in Bulgaria during 1986–2005.

The minor planet 3936 Elst, a stony Vestian asteroid from the inner regions of the asteroid belt, roughly 6 kilometers in diameter, was named in his honour.

== Discoveries ==
Elst is credited by the Minor Planet Center with the discovery of 3795 numbered minor planets made between 1986 and 2005.

Notable discoveries include 4486 Mithra, a near-Earth and Apollo asteroid, 7968 Elst-Pizarro, which is classified as both asteroid and comet, and more than 30 Jupiter trojans. His discoveries also include:

- Binary asteroids such as 4492 Debussy and 15268 Wendelinefroger
- Amor asteroids such as 21088 Chelyabinsk
- Many main-belt asteroids such as 9936 Al-Biruni (outer MBA), 12838 Adamsmith (Koronian), 13058 Alfredstevens (Vestian), 13070 Seanconnery (inner MBA), and 13963 Euphrates which orbits in a 2:1 resonance with Jupiter

In December 2017, the asteroid 13975 Beatrixpotter, discovered by Elst in 1992, was renamed in memory of the writer, artist, and naturalist.

Minor planet articles also exist for 12696 Camus, 8116 Jeanperrin, 22740 Rayleigh, 6267 Rozhen and 9951 Tyrannosaurus, among others.

List of minor planets discovered by Eric Elst

Name	Discovery Date	Listing
3631 Sigyn	25 January 1987	list
3784 Chopin	31 October 1986	list
3860 Plovdiv	8 August 1986	list^{[A]}
3870 Mayré	13 February 1988	list
3903 Kliment Ohridski	20 September 1987	list
3910 Liszt	16 September 1988	list
3912 Troja	16 September 1988	list
3918 Brel	13 August 1988	list
4038 Kristina	21 August 1987	list
4060 Deipylos	17 December 1987	list^{[B]}
4226 Damiaan	1 September 1989	list
4342 Freud	21 August 1987	list
4344 Buxtehude	11 February 1988	list
4345 Rachmaninoff	11 February 1988	list
4380 Geyer	14 August 1988	list
4457 van Gogh	3 September 1989	list
4486 Mithra	22 September 1987	list^{[C]}
4492 Debussy	17 September 1988	list
4501 Eurypylos	4 February 1989	list
4546 Franck	2 March 1990	list
4609 Pizarro	13 February 1988	list
4628 Laplace	7 September 1986	list
4635 Rimbaud	21 January 1988	list
4636 Chile	13 February 1988	list
4798 Mercator	26 September 1989	list

Name	Discovery Date	Listing
4804 Pasteur	2 December 1989	list
4825 Ventura	11 February 1988	list
4893 Seitter	9 August 1986	list^{[A]}
4943 Lac d'Orient	27 July 1987	list
4999 MPC	2 February 1987	list
5002 Marnix	20 September 1987	list
5033 Mistral	15 August 1990	list
5108 Lübeck	21 August 1987	list
5115 Frimout	13 February 1988	list
5127 Bruhns	4 February 1989	list
5184 Cavaillé-Coll	16 August 1990	list
5204 Herakleitos	11 February 1988	list
5232 Jordaens	14 August 1988	list
5254 Ulysses	7 November 1986	list
5260 Philvéron	2 September 1989	list
5350 Epetersen	3 April 1989	list
5351 Diderot	26 September 1989	list
5471 Tunguska	13 August 1988	list
5522 De Rop	3 August 1991	list
5651 Traversa	14 February 1991	list
5778 Jurafrance	28 December 1989	list
5780 Lafontaine	2 March 1990	list
5873 Archilochos	26 September 1989	list
5950 Leukippos	9 August 1986	list^{[A]}
5954 Epikouros	19 August 1987	list

Name	Discovery Date	Listing
5956 d'Alembert	13 February 1988	list
6001 Thales	11 February 1988	list
6006 Anaximandros	3 April 1989	list
6026 Xenophanes	23 January 1993	list
6035 Citlaltépetl	27 July 1987	list
6036 Weinberg	13 February 1988	list
6039 Parmenides	3 September 1989	list
6051 Anaximenes	30 January 1992	list
6123 Aristoteles	19 September 1987	list
6129 Demokritos	4 September 1989	list
6143 Pythagoras	14 May 1993	list
6152 Empedocles	3 April 1989	list
6186 Zenon	11 February 1988	list
6189 Völk	2 March 1989	list
6240 Lucretius Carus	26 September 1989	list
6267 Rozhen	20 September 1987	list
6268 Versailles	22 September 1990	list
6294 Czerny	11 February 1988	list
6295 Schmoll	11 February 1988	list
6304 Josephus Flavius	2 April 1989	list
6309 Elsschot	2 March 1990	list
6317 Dreyfus	16 October 1990	list
6319 Beregovoj	19 November 1990	list
6404 Vanavara	6 August 1991	list
6437 Stroganov	28 August 1987	list

Name	Discovery Date	Listing
6480 Scarlatti	12 August 1988	list
6483 Nikolajvasil'ev	2 March 1990	list
6519 Giono	12 February 1991	list
6549 Skryabin	13 August 1988	list
6595 Munizbarreto	21 August 1987	list
6604 Ilias	16 August 1990	list
6605 Carmontelle	22 September 1990	list
6647 Josse	8 April 1991	list
6710 Apostel	3 April 1989	list
6777 Balakirev	26 September 1989	list
6780 Borodin	2 March 1990	list
6798 Couperin	14 May 1993	list
6826 Lavoisier	26 September 1989	list
6829 Charmawidor	18 January 1991	list
6836 Paranal	10 August 1994	list
6871 Verlaine	23 January 1993	list
6912 Grimm	8 April 1991	list
6956 Holbach	13 February 1988	list
6972 Helvetius	4 April 1992	list
6977 Jaucourt	20 July 1993	list
7009 Hume	21 August 1987	list
7010 Locke	28 August 1987	list
7012 Hobbes	11 February 1988	list
7014 Nietzsche	3 April 1989	list
7015 Schopenhauer	16 August 1990	list

Name	Discovery Date	Listing
7020 Yourcenar	4 April 1992	list
7056 Kierkegaard	26 September 1989	list
7062 Meslier	6 August 1991	list
7064 Montesquieu	26 July 1992	list
7079 Baghdad	5 September 1986	list^{[A]}
7082 La Serena	17 December 1987	list^{[B]}
7083 Kant	4 February 1989	list
7095 Lamettrie	22 September 1992	list
7098 Réaumur	9 October 1993	list
7099 Feuerbach	20 April 1996	list
7126 Cureau	8 April 1991	list
7142 Spinoza	12 August 1994	list
7172 Multatuli	17 February 1988	list
7179 Gassendi	8 April 1991	list
7244 Villa-Lobos	5 August 1991	list
7285 Seggewiss	2 March 1990	list
7296 Lamarck	8 August 1992	list^{[D]}
7343 Ockeghem	4 April 1992	list
7346 Boulanger	20 February 1993	list
7349 Ernestmaes	18 August 1993	list
7399 Somme	29 January 1987	list
7400 Lenau	21 August 1987	list
7401 Toynbee	21 August 1987	list
7412 Linnaeus	22 September 1990	list
7416 Linnankoski	16 November 1990	list

Name	Discovery Date	Listing
7420 Buffon	4 September 1991	list
7425 Lessing	2 September 1992	list
7478 Hasse	20 July 1993	list
7537 Solvay	17 April 1996	list
7578 Georgböhm	22 September 1990	list
7587 Weckmann	2 February 1992	list
7647 Etrépigny	26 September 1989	list
7649 Bougainville	22 September 1990	list
7651 Villeneuve	15 November 1990	list
7661 Reincken	10 August 1994	list
7755 Haute-Provence	28 December 1989	list
7763 Crabeels	16 October 1990	list
7815 Dolon	21 August 1987	list
7871 Tunder	22 September 1990	list
7881 Schieferdecker	2 September 1992	list
7902 Hanff	18 April 1996	list
7903 Albinoni	20 April 1996	list
7933 Magritte	3 April 1989	list
7934 Sinatra	26 September 1989	list
7947 Toland	30 January 1992	list
7960 Condorcet	10 August 1994	list
7968 Elst-Pizarro	14 July 1996	list^{[B]}
8003 Kelvin	1 September 1987	list
8010 Böhnhardt	3 April 1989	list
8039 Grandprism	15 September 1993	list^{[E]}

Name	Discovery Date	Listing
8096 Emilezola	20 July 1993	list
8116 Jeanperrin	17 April 1996	list
8154 Stahl	15 February 1988	list
8164 Andreasdoppler	16 October 1990	list
8165 Gnädig	21 November 1990	list
8169 Mirabeau	2 August 1991	list
8175 Boerhaave	2 November 1991	list
8190 Bouguer	20 July 1993	list
8191 Mersenne	20 July 1993	list
8203 Jogolehmann	7 February 1994	list
8205 Van Dijck	10 August 1994	list
8221 La Condamine	14 July 1996	list
8275 Inca	11 November 1990	list
8277 Machu-Picchu	8 April 1991	list
8279 Cuzco	6 August 1991	list
8291 Bingham	2 September 1992	list
8297 Gérardfaure	18 August 1993	list
8298 Loubna	22 September 1993	list^{[E]}
8299 Téaleoni	9 October 1993	list
8308 Julie-Mélissa	17 April 1996	list
8345 Ulmerspatz	22 January 1987	list
8353 Megryan	3 April 1989	list
(8354) 1989 RF	1 September 1989	list
8370 Vanlindt	4 September 1991	list
8386 Vanvinckenroye	27 January 1993	list

Name	Discovery Date	Listing
8395 Rembaut	9 October 1993	list
8488 d'Argens	26 September 1989	list
8489 Boulder	7 October 1989	list
8491 Joelle-gilles	28 December 1989	list
8521 Boulainvilliers	4 April 1992	list
8523 Bouillabaisse	8 August 1992	list
8524 Paoloruffini	2 September 1992	list
8525 Nielsabel	2 September 1992	list
8541 Schalkenmehren	9 October 1993	list
8550 Hesiodos	12 August 1994	list
8643 Quercus	16 September 1988	list
8644 Betulapendula	16 September 1988	list
8647 Populus	2 September 1989	list
8648 Salix	2 September 1989	list
8649 Juglans	26 September 1989	list
8651 Alineraynal	29 December 1989	list
8652 Acacia	2 March 1990	list
8656 Cupressus	16 August 1990	list
8657 Cedrus	16 August 1990	list
8665 Daun-Eifel	8 April 1991	list
8672 Morse	6 August 1991	list
8676 Lully	2 February 1992	list
8685 Fauré	4 April 1992	list
8686 Akenside	26 July 1992	list
8687 Caussols	8 August 1992	list

Name	Discovery Date	Listing
8688 Delaunay	8 August 1992	list
8700 Gevaert	14 May 1993	list
8743 Kèneke	1 March 1998	list
8826 Corneville	13 August 1988	list
8832 Altenrath	2 March 1989	list
8833 Acer	3 September 1989	list
8834 Anacardium	26 September 1989	list
8835 Annona	26 September 1989	list
8836 Aquifolium	26 September 1989	list
8837 London	7 October 1989	list
8849 Brighton	15 November 1990	list
8850 Bignonia	15 November 1990	list
8852 Buxus	8 April 1991	list
8856 Celastrus	6 June 1991	list
8857 Cercidiphyllum	6 August 1991	list
8858 Cornus	6 August 1991	list
8872 Ebenum	4 April 1992	list
8886 Elaeagnus	9 March 1994	list
8888 Tartaglia	8 July 1994	list
8890 Montaigne	10 August 1994	list
9019 Eucommia	28 August 1987	list
9020 Eucryphia	19 September 1987	list
9021 Fagus	14 February 1988	list
9040 Flacourtia	18 January 1991	list
9053 Hamamelis	2 November 1991	list

Name	Discovery Date	Listing
9054 Hippocastanum	30 December 1991	list
9059 Dumas	8 August 1992	list
9071 Coudenberghe	19 July 1993	list
9079 Gesner	10 August 1994	list
9130 Galois	25 April 1998	list
9161 Beaufort	26 January 1987	list
9171 Carolyndiane	4 April 1989	list
9184 Vasilij	2 August 1991	list
9194 Ananoff	26 July 1992	list
9203 Myrtus	9 October 1993	list
9205 Eddywally	10 August 1994	list
9239 van Riebeeck	3 May 1997	list
9242 Olea	6 February 1998	list
9246 Niemeyer	25 April 1998	list
9306 Pittosporum	2 February 1987	list
9309 Platanus	20 September 1987	list
9313 Protea	13 February 1988	list
9316 Rhamnus	12 August 1988	list
9325 Stonehenge	3 April 1989	list
9326 Ruta	26 September 1989	list
9327 Duerbeck	26 September 1989	list
9329 Nikolaimedtner	2 March 1990	list
9331 Fannyhensel	16 August 1990	list
9334 Moesta	16 October 1990	list
9339 Kimnovak	8 April 1991	list

Name	Discovery Date	Listing
9340 Williamholden	6 June 1991	list
9341 Gracekelly	2 August 1991	list
9342 Carygrant	6 August 1991	list
9346 Fernandel	4 September 1991	list
9356 Elineke	30 December 1991	list
9364 Clusius	23 April 1992	list
9365 Chinesewilson	2 September 1992	list
9376 Thionville	20 July 1993	list
9377 Metz	15 August 1993	list
9378 Nancy-Lorraine	18 August 1993	list
9379 Dijon	18 August 1993	list
9380 Mâcon	17 August 1993	list
9381 Lyon	15 September 1993	list^{[E]}
9383 Montélimar	9 October 1993	list
9384 Aransio	9 October 1993	list
9385 Avignon	9 October 1993	list
9389 Condillac	9 March 1994	list
9392 Cavaillon	10 August 1994	list
9393 Apta	10 August 1994	list
9394 Manosque	10 August 1994	list
9395 Saint Michel	10 August 1994	list
9430 Erichthonios	17 April 1996	list
9446 Cicero	3 May 1997	list
9447 Julesbordet	3 May 1997	list
9452 Rogerpeeters	27 February 1998	list

Name	Discovery Date	Listing
9468 Brewer	1 June 1998	list
9470 Jussieu	26 July 1998	list
9471 Ostend	26 July 1998	list
9472 Bruges	26 July 1998	list
9473 Ghent	26 July 1998	list
9561 van Eyck	19 August 1987	list
9562 Memling	1 September 1987	list
9569 Quintenmatsijs	11 February 1988	list
9576 van der Weyden	4 February 1989	list
9578 Klyazma	3 April 1989	list
9579 Passchendaele	3 April 1989	list
9587 Bonpland	16 October 1990	list
9588 Quesnay	18 November 1990	list
9589 Deridder	21 November 1990	list
9592 Clairaut	8 April 1991	list
9604 Bellevanzuylen	30 December 1991	list
9611 Anouck	2 September 1992	list
9614 Cuvier	27 January 1993	list
9615 Hemerijckx	23 January 1993	list
9626 Stanley	14 May 1993	list
9629 Servet	15 August 1993	list
9630 Castellion	15 August 1993	list
9631 Hubertreeves	17 September 1993	list
9633 Cotur	20 October 1993	list
9638 Fuchs	10 August 1994	list

Name	Discovery Date	Listing
9639 Scherer	10 August 1994	list
9640 Lippens	12 August 1994	list
9641 Demazière	12 August 1994	list
9663 Zwin	15 April 1996	list
9664 Brueghel	17 April 1996	list
9748 van Ostaijen	4 February 1989	list
9749 Van den Eijnde	3 April 1989	list
9757 Felixdejager	8 April 1991	list
9774 Annjudge	12 July 1993	list
9775 Joeferguson	19 July 1993	list
9778 Isabelallende	12 August 1994	list
9795 Deprez	15 April 1996	list
9797 Raes	18 April 1996	list
9812 Danco	18 September 1998	list
9839 Crabbegat	11 February 1988	list
9859 Van Lierde	3 August 1991	list
9860 Archaeopteryx	6 August 1991	list
9879 Mammuthus	12 August 1994	list
9880 Stegosaurus	12 August 1994	list
9936 Al-Biruni	8 August 1986	list^{[A]}
9937 Triceratops	17 February 1988	list
9941 Iguanodon	4 February 1989	list
9949 Brontosaurus	22 September 1990	list
9951 Tyrannosaurus	15 November 1990	list
9954 Brachiosaurus	8 April 1991	list

Name	Discovery Date	Listing
9973 Szpilman	12 July 1993	list
9974 Brody	19 July 1993	list
10057 L'Obel	11 February 1988	list
10068 Dodoens	4 February 1989	list
10069 Fontenelle	4 February 1989	list
10071 Paraguay	2 March 1989	list
10072 Uruguay	3 April 1989	list
10073 Peterhiscocks	3 April 1989	list
10074 Van den Berghe	3 April 1989	list
10075 Campeche	3 April 1989	list
10079 Meunier	2 December 1989	list
10088 Digne	22 September 1990	list
10089 Turgot	22 September 1990	list
10093 Diesel	18 November 1990	list
10101 Fourier	30 January 1992	list
10111 Fresnel	25 July 1992	list
10119 Remarque	18 December 1992	list
10120 Ypres	18 December 1992	list
10121 Arzamas	27 January 1993	list
10122 Fröding	27 January 1993	list
10136 Gauguin	20 July 1993	list
10137 Thucydides	15 August 1993	list
10139 Ronsard	19 September 1993	list
10140 Villon	19 September 1993	list
10151 Rubens	12 August 1994	list

Name	Discovery Date	Listing
10183 Ampère	15 April 1996	list
10184 Galvani	18 April 1996	list
10185 Gaudi	18 April 1996	list
10186 Albéniz	20 April 1996	list
10303 Fréret	2 September 1989	list
10305 Grignard	29 December 1989	list
10306 Pagnol	21 August 1990	list
10310 Delacroix	16 August 1990	list
10311 Fantin-Latour	16 August 1990	list
10316 Williamturner	22 September 1990	list
10323 Frazer	14 November 1990	list
10325 Bexa	18 November 1990	list
10327 Batens	21 November 1990	list
10330 Durkheim	8 April 1991	list
10334 Gibbon	3 August 1991	list
10347 Murom	23 April 1992	list
10350 Spallanzani	26 July 1992	list
10354 Guillaumebudé	27 January 1993	list
10356 Rudolfsteiner	15 September 1993	list
10358 Kirchhoff	9 October 1993	list
10361 Bunsen	12 August 1994	list
10374 Etampes	15 April 1996	list
10377 Kilimanjaro	14 July 1996	list
10378 Ingmarbergman	14 July 1996	list
10380 Berwald	8 August 1996	list

Name	Discovery Date	Listing
10506 Rydberg	13 February 1988	list
10509 Heinrichkayser	3 April 1989	list
10510 Maxschreier	3 April 1989	list
10523 D'Haveloose	22 September 1990	list
10524 Maniewski	22 September 1990	list
10529 Giessenburg	16 November 1990	list
10541 Malesherbes	31 December 1991	list
10542 Ruckers	2 February 1992	list
10549 Helsingborg	2 September 1992	list
10550 Malmö	2 September 1992	list
10551 Göteborg	18 December 1992	list
10552 Stockholm	22 January 1993	list
10557 Rowland	15 September 1993	list
10558 Karlstad	15 September 1993	list
10586 Jansteen	22 May 1996	list
10587 Strindberg	14 July 1996	list
10612 Houffalize	3 May 1997	list
10637 Heimlich	26 August 1998	list
10726 Elodie	28 January 1987	list
10733 Georgesand	11 February 1988	list
10734 Wieck	13 February 1988	list
10735 Seine	15 February 1988	list
10758 Aldoushuxley	22 September 1990	list
10769 Minas Gerais	16 October 1990	list
10770 Belo Horizonte	15 November 1990	list

Name	Discovery Date	Listing
10771 Ouro Prêto	15 November 1990	list
10780 Apollinaire	2 August 1991	list
10784 Noailles	4 September 1991	list
10785 Dejaiffe	4 September 1991	list
10792 Ecuador	2 February 1992	list
10793 Quito	2 February 1992	list
10797 Guatemala	4 April 1992	list
10799 Yucatán	26 July 1992	list
10806 Mexico	23 March 1993	list
10820 Offenbach	18 August 1993	list
10830 Desforges	20 October 1993	list
10838 Lebon	9 March 1994	list
10866 Peru	14 July 1996	list
10867 Lima	14 July 1996	list
10934 Pauldelvaux	27 February 1998	list
11039 Raynal	3 April 1989	list
11040 Wundt	3 September 1989	list
11041 Fechner	26 September 1989	list
11042 Ernstweber	3 November 1989	list
11051 Racine	15 November 1990	list
11055 Honduras	8 April 1991	list
11056 Volland	6 June 1991	list
11063 Poynting	2 November 1991	list
11073 Cavell	2 September 1992	list
11082 Spilliaert	14 May 1993	list

Name	Discovery Date	Listing
11083 Caracas	15 September 1993	list
11085 Isala	17 September 1993	list
11090 Popelin	7 February 1994	list
11094 Cuba	10 August 1994	list
11095 Havana	12 August 1994	list
11166 Anatolefrance	27 February 1998	list
11278 Telesio	26 September 1989	list
11289 Frescobaldi	2 August 1991	list
11298 Gide	2 September 1992	list
11299 Annafreud	22 September 1992	list
11302 Rubicon	27 January 1993	list
11309 Malus	15 August 1993	list
11314 Charcot	8 July 1994	list
11315 Salpêtrière	8 July 1994	list
11332 Jameswatt	15 April 1996	list
11334 Rio de Janeiro	18 April 1996	list
11335 Santiago	20 April 1996	list
11336 Piranesi	14 July 1996	list
11349 Witten	3 May 1997	list
11363 Vives	1 March 1998	list
11379 Flaubert	21 September 1998	list
11384 Sartre	18 September 1998	list
11385 Beauvoir	20 September 1998	list
11484 Daudet	17 February 1988	list
11498 Julgeerts	3 April 1989	list

Name	Discovery Date	Listing
11499 Duras	2 September 1989	list
11506 Toulouse-Lautrec	2 March 1990	list
11509 Thersilochos	15 November 1990	list
11510 Borges	11 November 1990	list
11518 Jung	8 April 1991	list
11519 Adler	8 April 1991	list
11520 Fromm	8 April 1991	list
11521 Erikson	10 April 1991	list
11524 Pleyel	2 August 1991	list
11530 d'Indy	2 February 1992	list
11542 Solikamsk	22 September 1992	list
11552 Boucolion	27 January 1993	list
11553 Scheria	27 January 1993	list
11554 Asios	22 January 1993	list
11571 Daens	20 July 1993	list
11572 Schindler	15 September 1993	list
11574 d'Alviella	16 January 1994	list
11577 Einasto	8 February 1994	list
11581 Philipdejager	10 August 1994	list
11582 Bleuler	10 August 1994	list
11583 Breuer	12 August 1994	list
11584 Ferenczi	10 August 1994	list
11585 Orlandelassus	3 September 1994	list
11842 Kap'bos	22 January 1987	list
11844 Ostwald	22 August 1987	list

Name	Discovery Date	Listing
11846 Verminnen	21 September 1987	list
11848 Paullouka	11 February 1988	list
11849 Fauvel	15 February 1988	list
11870 Sverige	7 October 1989	list
11871 Norge	7 October 1989	list
11874 Gringauz	2 December 1989	list
11875 Rhône	28 December 1989	list
11876 Doncarpenter	2 March 1990	list
11881 Mirstation	20 August 1990	list
11895 Dehant	8 April 1991	list
11896 Camelbeeck	8 April 1991	list
11897 Lemaire	8 April 1991	list
11898 Dedeyn	10 April 1991	list
11900 Spinoy	6 June 1991	list
11905 Giacometti	6 November 1991	list
11908 Nicaragua	4 April 1992	list
11912 Piedade	30 July 1992	list
11913 Svarna	2 September 1992	list
11914 Sinachopoulos	2 September 1992	list
11926 Orinoco	18 December 1992	list
11942 Guettard	12 July 1993	list
11943 Davidhartley	20 July 1993	list
11944 Shaftesbury	20 July 1993	list
11945 Amsterdam	15 August 1993	list
11946 Bayle	15 August 1993	list

Name	Discovery Date	Listing
11947 Kimclijsters	15 August 1993	list
11948 Justinehénin	18 August 1993	list
11950 Morellet	19 September 1993	list
11956 Tamarakate	8 February 1994	list
11958 Galiani	9 March 1994	list
11963 Ignace	10 August 1994	list
11964 Prigogine	10 August 1994	list
11965 Catullus	12 August 1994	list
11966 Plateau	12 August 1994	list
11967 Boyle	12 August 1994	list
11968 Demariotte	12 August 1994	list
11969 Gay-Lussac	10 August 1994	list
11984 Manet	20 October 1995	list
12052 Aretaon	3 May 1997	list
12059 du Châtelet	1 March 1998	list
12095 Pinel	25 April 1998	list
12100 Amiens	25 April 1998	list
12111 Ulm	1 June 1998	list
12238 Actor	17 December 1987	list^{[B]}
12239 Carolinakou	13 February 1988	list
12257 Lassine	3 April 1989	list
12258 Oscarwilde	3 April 1989	list
12259 Szukalski	26 September 1989	list
12261 Ledouanier	7 October 1989	list
12270 Bozar	16 August 1990	list

Name	Discovery Date	Listing
12275 Marcelgoffin	15 November 1990	list
12276 IJzer	18 November 1990	list
12279 Laon	16 November 1990	list
12280 Reims	16 November 1990	list
12281 Chaumont	16 November 1990	list
12282 Crombecq	21 January 1991	list
12286 Poiseuille	8 April 1991	list
12287 Langres	8 April 1991	list
12288 Verdun	8 April 1991	list
12289 Carnot	8 April 1991	list
12291 Gohnaumann	6 June 1991	list
12292 Dalton	6 June 1991	list
12294 Avogadro	2 August 1991	list
12295 Tasso	2 August 1991	list
12301 Eötvös	4 September 1991	list
12320 Loschmidt	8 August 1992	list
12324 Van Rompaey	2 September 1992	list
12325 Bogota	2 September 1992	list
12339 Carloo	18 December 1992	list
12340 Stalle	18 December 1992	list
12341 Calevoet	27 January 1993	list
12352 Jepejacobsen	20 July 1993	list
12353 Màrquez	20 July 1993	list
12354 Hemmerechts	18 August 1993	list
12355 Coelho	18 August 1993	list

Name	Discovery Date	Listing
12356 Carlscheele	15 September 1993	list
12363 Marinmarais	9 October 1993	list
12368 Mutsaers	7 February 1994	list
12369 Pirandello	8 February 1994	list
(12375) 1994 NO_{1}	8 July 1994	list
12376 Cochabamba	8 July 1994	list
12379 Thulin	10 August 1994	list
12380 Sciascia	10 August 1994	list
12381 Hugoclaus	12 August 1994	list
12444 Prothoon	15 April 1996	list
12481 Streuvels	12 March 1997	list
12490 Leiden	3 May 1997	list
12491 Musschenbroek	3 May 1997	list
12492 Tanais	3 May 1997	list
12524 Conscience	25 April 1998	list
12526 de Coninck	25 April 1998	list
12534 Janhoet	1 June 1998	list
12540 Picander	26 July 1998	list
12567 Herreweghe	21 September 1998	list
12687 de Valory	17 December 1987	list^{[B]}
12688 Baekeland	13 February 1988	list
12695 Utrecht	1 April 1989	list
12696 Camus	26 September 1989	list
12697 Verhaeren	26 September 1989	list
12701 Chénier	15 April 1990	list

Name	Discovery Date	Listing
12702 Panamarenko	22 September 1990	list
12708 Van Straten	16 October 1990	list
12709 Bergen op Zoom	15 November 1990	list
12710 Breda	15 November 1990	list
12715 Godin	8 April 1991	list
12716 Delft	8 April 1991	list
12718 Le Gentil	6 June 1991	list
12719 Pingré	6 June 1991	list
12722 Petrarca	10 August 1991	list
12727 Cavendish	14 August 1991	list
12742 Delisle	26 July 1992	list
12747 Michageffert	18 December 1992	list
12750 Berthollet	18 February 1993	list
12755 Balmer	20 July 1993	list
12757 Yangtze	14 September 1993	list^{[E]}
12759 Joule	9 October 1993	list
12760 Maxwell	9 October 1993	list
12761 Pauwels	9 October 1993	list
12766 Paschen	9 November 1993	list
12773 Lyman	10 August 1994	list
12774 Pfund	12 August 1994	list
12775 Brackett	12 August 1994	list
12776 Reynolds	12 August 1994	list
12817 Federica	22 March 1996	list
12838 Adamsmith	9 March 1997	list

Name	Discovery Date	Listing
12845 Crick	3 May 1997	list
12850 Axelmunthe	6 February 1998	list
12867 Joëloïc	1 June 1998	list
12873 Clausewitz	26 July 1998	list
12895 Balbastre	26 August 1998	list
12896 Geoffroy	26 August 1998	list
13011 Loeillet	26 August 1987	list
13027 Geeraerts	3 April 1989	list
13031 Durance	26 September 1989	list
13032 Tarn	7 October 1989	list
13033 Gardon	7 October 1989	list
13037 Potosi	2 March 1990	list
13038 Woolston	2 March 1990	list
13044 Wannes	16 August 1990	list
13045 Vermandere	16 August 1990	list
(13051) 1990 SF_{5}	22 September 1990	list
13052 Las Casas	22 September 1990	list
13053 Bertrandrussell	22 September 1990	list
13058 Alfredstevens	19 November 1990	list
13059 Ducuroir	18 January 1991	list
13064 Haemhouts	6 August 1991	list
13069 Umbertoeco	6 September 1991	list
13070 Seanconnery	8 September 1991	list
13079 Toots	2 February 1992	list
13085 Borlaug	23 April 1992	list

Name	Discovery Date	Listing
13087 Chastellux	30 July 1992	list
13088 Filipportera	8 August 1992	list
13096 Tigris	27 January 1993	list
13097 Lamoraal	23 January 1993	list
13109 Berzelius	14 May 1993	list
13112 Montmorency	18 August 1993	list
13113 Williamyeats	15 September 1993	list
13114 Isabelgodin	19 September 1993	list
13115 Jeangodin	17 September 1993	list
13116 Hortensia	9 October 1993	list
13117 Pondicherry	9 October 1993	list
13118 La Harpe	20 October 1993	list
13121 Tisza	7 February 1994	list
13122 Drava	7 February 1994	list
13125 Tobolsk	10 August 1994	list
13126 Calbuco	10 August 1994	list
13127 Jeroenbrouwers	12 August 1994	list
13128 Aleppo	12 August 1994	list
13129 Poseidonios	12 August 1994	list
13130 Dylanthomas	12 August 1994	list
13131 Palmyra	12 August 1994	list
13132 Ortelius	12 August 1994	list
13133 Jandecleir	10 August 1994	list
13177 Hansschmidt	17 April 1996	list
13178 Catalan	18 April 1996	list

Name	Discovery Date	Listing
13179 Johncochrane	18 April 1996	list
13180 Fourcroy	18 April 1996	list
13184 Augeias	4 October 1996	list
13185 Agasthenes	5 October 1996	list
13209 Arnhem	9 April 1997	list
13212 Jayleno	3 May 1997	list
13213 Maclaurin	3 May 1997	list
13214 Chirikov	3 May 1997	list
13238 Lambeaux	25 April 1998	list
13253 Stejneger	26 July 1998	list
13254 Kekulé	26 July 1998	list
(13255) 1998 OH_{14}	26 July 1998	list
13256 Marne	26 July 1998	list
13293 Mechelen	26 August 1998	list
13294 Rockox	25 August 1998	list
13350 Gmelin	20 September 1998	list
13351 Zibeline	20 September 1998	list
13352 Gyssens	18 September 1998	list
13498 Al Chwarizmi	6 August 1986	list^{[A]}
13509 Guayaquil	4 April 1989	list
13513 Manila	2 March 1990	list
13520 Félicienrops	15 November 1990	list
13523 Vanhassel	6 June 1991	list
13525 Paulledoux	2 August 1991	list
13526 Libbrecht	3 August 1991	list

Name	Discovery Date	Listing
13533 Junili	4 September 1991	list
13534 Alain-Fournier	4 September 1991	list
13560 La Pérouse	2 September 1992	list
13579 Allodd	12 July 1993	list
13580 de Saussure	20 July 1993	list
13583 Bosret	9 October 1993	list
(13584) 1993 TH_{19}	9 October 1993	list
13585 Justinsmith	9 October 1993	list
13586 Copenhagen	9 October 1993	list
(13587) 1993 TQ_{29}	9 October 1993	list
(13588) 1993 TU_{38}	9 October 1993	list
(13595) 1994 PL_{3}	10 August 1994	list
(13596) 1994 PD_{18}	10 August 1994	list
(13597) 1994 PH_{18}	12 August 1994	list
(13598) 1994 PY_{19}	12 August 1994	list
13599 Lisbon	12 August 1994	list
(13600) 1994 PL_{26}	12 August 1994	list
(13601) 1994 PU_{29}	12 August 1994	list
13602 Pierreboulez	10 August 1994	list
(13603) 1994 PV_{37}	10 August 1994	list
(13604) 1994 PA_{39}	10 August 1994	list
13641 de Lesseps	15 April 1996	list
13644 Lynnanderson	17 April 1996	list
(13645) 1996 HF_{11}	17 April 1996	list
(13646) 1996 HC_{12}	17 April 1996	list

Name	Discovery Date	Listing
13647 Rey	20 April 1996	list
13650 Perimedes	4 October 1996	list
13657 Badinter	8 March 1997	list
13669 Swammerdam	3 May 1997	list
(13670) 1997 JD_{15}	3 May 1997	list
(13671) 1997 JH_{18}	3 May 1997	list
13703 Romero	26 July 1998	list
(13755) 1998 SR_{70}	21 September 1998	list
(13756) 1998 ST_{72}	21 September 1998	list
(13757) 1998 ST_{73}	21 September 1998	list
(13758) 1998 SN_{74}	21 September 1998	list
(13768) 1998 SS_{143}	18 September 1998	list
(13769) 1998 SV_{144}	20 September 1998	list
13770 Commerson	20 September 1998	list
13772 Livius	18 September 1998	list
13788 Dansolander	18 October 1998	list
(13789) 1998 UZ_{28}	18 October 1998	list
(13939) 1989 SJ_{2}	26 September 1989	list
(13940) 1989 SZ_{3}	26 September 1989	list
(13951) 1990 SD_{5}	22 September 1990	list
13952 Nykvist	22 September 1990	list
13956 Banks	15 November 1990	list
(13960) 1991 GF_{8}	8 April 1991	list
13962 Delambre	3 August 1991	list
13963 Euphrates	3 August 1991	list

Name	Discovery Date	Listing
13964 La Billardière	3 August 1991	list
13975 Beatrixpotter	30 January 1992	list
13982 Thunberg	2 September 1992	list
(13983) 1992 RJ_{5}	2 September 1992	list
(13984) 1992 RM_{7}	2 September 1992	list
(13988) 1992 YG_{2}	18 December 1992	list
(14003) 1993 OO_{4}	20 July 1993	list
(14007) 1993 TH_{14}	9 October 1993	list
(14008) 1993 TD_{17}	9 October 1993	list
14015 Senancour	16 January 1994	list^{[D]}
14016 Steller	16 January 1994	list^{[D]}
(14018) 1994 PM_{14}	10 August 1994	list
14019 Pourbus	10 August 1994	list
(14020) 1994 PE_{18}	10 August 1994	list
(14021) 1994 PL_{20}	12 August 1994	list
(14022) 1994 PW_{27}	12 August 1994	list
(14023) 1994 PX_{31}	12 August 1994	list
(14064) 1996 DT_{3}	16 February 1996	list
(14067) 1996 GY_{17}	15 April 1996	list
14069 Krasheninnikov	18 April 1996	list
(14108) 1998 OA_{13}	26 July 1998	list
(14109) 1998 OM_{14}	26 July 1998	list
(14130) 1998 QQ_{103}	26 August 1998	list
(14131) 1998 QN_{105}	25 August 1998	list
(14132) 1998 QB_{106}	25 August 1998	list

Name	Discovery Date	Listing
(14150) 1998 SQ_{65}	20 September 1998	list
(14151) 1998 SJ_{73}	21 September 1998	list
(14152) 1998 SV_{73}	21 September 1998	list
(14160) 1998 SB_{144}	18 September 1998	list
(14161) 1998 SO_{145}	20 September 1998	list
14354 Kolesnikov	21 August 1987	list
(14359) 1988 CU_{1}	11 February 1988	list
14360 Ipatov	13 February 1988	list
(14377) 1989 TX_{2}	7 October 1989	list
(14393) 1990 SX_{6}	22 September 1990	list
(14396) 1990 UX_{4}	16 October 1990	list
(14397) 1990 VS_{4}	15 November 1990	list
(14398) 1990 VT_{6}	14 November 1990	list
(14399) 1990 WN_{4}	16 November 1990	list
14400 Baudot	16 November 1990	list
14403 de Machault	8 April 1991	list
14411 Clérambault	6 September 1991	list
(14437) 1992 GD_{3}	4 April 1992	list
14439 Evermeersch	2 September 1992	list
(14440) 1992 RF_{5}	2 September 1992	list
14467 Vranckx	20 July 1993	list
14468 Ottostern	19 July 1993	list
(14470) 1993 RV_{7}	15 September 1993	list
(14473) 1993 TL_{17}	9 October 1993	list
(14474) 1993 TL_{25}	9 October 1993	list

Name	Discovery Date	Listing
14479 Plekhanov	8 February 1994	list
(14481) 1994 PO_{12}	10 August 1994	list
(14482) 1994 PK_{15}	10 August 1994	list
(14483) 1994 PZ_{22}	12 August 1994	list
(14484) 1994 PU_{32}	12 August 1994	list
14513 Alicelindner	15 April 1996	list
(14514) 1996 GA_{18}	15 April 1996	list
(14516) 1996 HM_{11}	17 April 1996	list
14519 Ural	8 October 1996	list
(14527) 1997 JD_{12}	3 May 1997	list
(14528) 1997 JN_{15}	3 May 1997	list
(14565) 1998 EQ_{10}	1 March 1998	list
(14579) 1998 QZ_{99}	26 August 1998	list
(14580) 1998 QW_{101}	26 August 1998	list
(14599) 1998 SV_{64}	20 September 1998	list
14600 Gainsbourg	21 September 1998	list
(14601) 1998 SU_{73}	21 September 1998	list
(14602) 1998 SW_{74}	21 September 1998	list
(14609) 1998 SW_{145}	20 September 1998	list
(14610) 1998 SE_{146}	20 September 1998	list
14611 Elsaadawi	20 September 1998	list
14612 Irtish	18 September 1998	list
14831 Gentileschi	22 January 1987	list
14832 Alechinsky	27 August 1987	list
(14847) 1989 CY_{2}	4 February 1989	list

Name	Discovery Date	Listing
(14848) 1989 GK_{1}	3 April 1989	list
(14849) 1989 GQ_{1}	3 April 1989	list
(14854) 1989 SO_{1}	26 September 1989	list
(14862) 1990 EQ_{2}	2 March 1990	list
(14865) 1990 QE_{7}	20 August 1990	list
(14869) 1990 ST_{8}	22 September 1990	list
14872 Hoher List	23 October 1990	list
(14874) 1990 US_{4}	16 October 1990	list
(14875) 1990 WZ_{1}	18 November 1990	list
14876 Dampier	18 November 1990	list
14877 Zauberflöte	19 November 1990	list
(14878) 1990 WE_{9}	19 November 1990	list
14885 Paskoff	6 September 1991	list
(14897) 1992 GE_{5}	6 April 1992	list
(14900) 1992 RH_{5}	2 September 1992	list
(14906) 1993 NJ_{1}	12 July 1993	list
(14907) 1993 OF_{3}	20 July 1993	list
(14908) 1993 OQ_{4}	20 July 1993	list
14909 Kamchatka	14 August 1993	list
(14910) 1993 QR_{4}	18 August 1993	list
(14913) 1993 RP_{7}	15 September 1993	list
14914 Moreux	9 October 1993	list
(14915) 1993 UM_{8}	20 October 1993	list
(14920) 1994 PE_{33}	12 August 1994	list
(14957) 1996 HQ_{22}	20 April 1996	list

Name	Discovery Date	Listing
14961 d'Auteroche	8 June 1996	list
(15022) 1998 SM_{144}	20 September 1998	list
(15229) 1987 QZ_{6}	22 August 1987	list
15239 Stenhammar	4 February 1989	list
(15240) 1989 GF_{3}	3 April 1989	list
(15241) 1989 ST_{3}	26 September 1989	list
(15242) 1989 SX_{5}	26 September 1989	list
(15244) 1989 TY_{2}	7 October 1989	list
15249 Capodimonte	28 December 1989	list
(15251) 1990 EF_{2}	2 March 1990	list
(15255) 1990 QQ_{8}	16 August 1990	list
(15259) 1990 SL_{7}	22 September 1990	list
(15260) 1990 SY_{8}	22 September 1990	list
(15266) 1990 UQ_{3}	16 October 1990	list
15267 Kolyma	15 November 1990	list
15268 Wendelinefroger	18 November 1990	list
15273 Ruhmkorff	8 April 1991	list
(15274) 1991 GO_{6}	8 April 1991	list
(15275) 1991 GV_{6}	8 April 1991	list
(15277) 1991 PC_{7}	6 August 1991	list
15278 Pâquet	6 August 1991	list
(15279) 1991 PY_{7}	6 August 1991	list
(15300) 1992 RV_{2}	2 September 1992	list
(15319) 1993 NU_{1}	12 July 1993	list
(15320) 1993 OQ_{8}	20 July 1993	list

Name	Discovery Date	Listing
(15322) 1993 QY	16 August 1993	list
(15323) 1993 QH_{4}	18 August 1993	list
(15324) 1993 QO_{4}	18 August 1993	list
(15325) 1993 QN_{7}	20 August 1993	list
(15326) 1993 QA_{9}	20 August 1993	list
(15328) 1993 RJ_{9}	14 September 1993	list^{[E]}
15329 Sabena	17 September 1993	list
(15331) 1993 TO_{24}	9 October 1993	list
15332 CERN	9 October 1993	list
(15340) 1994 CE_{14}	8 February 1994	list
(15341) 1994 CV_{16}	8 February 1994	list
(15345) 1994 PK_{11}	10 August 1994	list
15355 Maupassant	2 January 1995	list
(15365) 1996 HQ_{9}	17 April 1996	list
(15366) 1996 HR_{16}	18 April 1996	list
(15367) 1996 HP_{23}	20 April 1996	list
15372 Agrigento	8 October 1996	list
15417 Babylon	27 February 1998	list
(15424) 1998 QE_{100}	26 August 1998	list
(15706) 1988 CE_{2}	11 February 1988	list
(15711) 1989 GZ_{1}	3 April 1989	list
(15713) 1989 SM_{4}	26 September 1989	list
(15720) 1990 EN_{1}	2 March 1990	list
15732 Vitusbering	15 November 1990	list
(15733) 1990 VB_{6}	15 November 1990	list

Name	Discovery Date	Listing
(15734) 1990 WV_{1}	18 November 1990	list
15735 Andakerkhoven	18 November 1990	list
(15741) 1991 GZ_{6}	8 April 1991	list
15742 Laurabassi	6 June 1991	list
15745 Yuliya	3 August 1991	list
15752 Eluard	30 January 1992	list
(15759) 1992 GM_{4}	4 April 1992	list
15766 Strahlenberg	22 January 1993	list
(15780) 1993 OO_{3}	20 July 1993	list
(15781) 1993 OJ_{7}	20 July 1993	list
(15782) 1993 ON_{8}	20 July 1993	list
15783 Briancox	14 August 1993	list
15785 de Villegas	18 August 1993	list
(15787) 1993 RY_{7}	15 September 1993	list
(15792) 1993 TS_{15}	9 October 1993	list
(15793) 1993 TG_{19}	9 October 1993	list
(15794) 1993 TG_{31}	9 October 1993	list
(15795) 1993 TY_{38}	9 October 1993	list
(15796) 1993 TZ_{38}	9 October 1993	list
15804 Yenisei	9 March 1994	list
(15813) 1994 PL_{12}	10 August 1994	list
(15814) 1994 PX_{12}	10 August 1994	list
(15815) 1994 PY_{18}	12 August 1994	list
(15816) 1994 PV_{39}	10 August 1994	list
(15839) 1995 JH_{1}	5 May 1995	list

Name	Discovery Date	Listing
(15859) 1996 GO_{18}	15 April 1996	list
15861 Ispahan	17 April 1996	list
(15862) 1996 HJ_{15}	17 April 1996	list
(15863) 1996 HT_{15}	18 April 1996	list
(15864) 1996 HQ_{23}	20 April 1996	list
(15865) 1996 HW_{25}	20 April 1996	list
(15867) 1996 NK_{5}	14 July 1996	list
(15894) 1997 JA_{13}	3 May 1997	list
(15895) 1997 JJ_{15}	3 May 1997	list
15963 Koeberl	6 February 1998	list
15969 Charlesgreen	1 March 1998	list
16413 Abulghazi	28 January 1987	list
16414 Le Procope	25 August 1987	list
16421 Roadrunner	22 January 1988	list
16424 Davaine	11 February 1988	list
16425 Chuckyeager	11 February 1988	list
(16442) 1989 GM_{1}	3 April 1989	list
(16443) 1989 GV_{1}	3 April 1989	list
16444 Godefroy	3 April 1989	list
16445 Klimt	3 April 1989	list
16447 Vauban	3 September 1989	list
16450 Messerschmidt	26 September 1989	list
(16451) 1989 SO_{3}	26 September 1989	list
(16464) 1990 EV_{1}	2 March 1990	list
(16478) 1990 QS_{6}	20 August 1990	list

Name	Discovery Date	Listing
16479 Paulze	20 August 1990	list
(16480) 1990 QN_{7}	20 August 1990	list
16481 Thames	16 August 1990	list
(16482) 1990 QK_{8}	16 August 1990	list
(16483) 1990 QX_{8}	16 August 1990	list
(16484) 1990 QJ_{9}	16 August 1990	list
(16492) 1990 SQ_{5}	22 September 1990	list
(16493) 1990 SB_{6}	22 September 1990	list
16494 Oka	22 September 1990	list
(16495) 1990 SR_{8}	22 September 1990	list
(16496) 1990 SS_{8}	22 September 1990	list
16497 Toinevermeylen	22 September 1990	list
16498 Passau	22 September 1990	list
(16499) 1990 SU_{9}	22 September 1990	list
(16509) 1990 UE_{4}	16 October 1990	list
(16510) 1990 UL_{4}	16 October 1990	list
(16511) 1990 UR_{4}	16 October 1990	list
(16512) 1990 VQ_{4}	15 November 1990	list
16513 Vasks	15 November 1990	list
(16519) 1990 WV	18 November 1990	list
(16520) 1990 WO_{3}	21 November 1990	list
(16521) 1990 WR_{5}	18 November 1990	list
(16530) 1991 GR_{7}	8 April 1991	list
(16531) 1991 GO_{8}	8 April 1991	list
(16536) 1991 PV_{1}	10 August 1991	list

Name	Discovery Date	Listing
(16542) 1991 PK_{31}	14 August 1991	list
16543 Rosetta	5 September 1991	list
16560 Daitor	2 November 1991	list
16563 Ob	30 January 1992	list
16564 Coriolis	30 January 1992	list
(16566) 1992 CZ_{2}	2 February 1992	list
(16567) 1992 CQ_{3}	2 February 1992	list
16583 Oersted	26 July 1992	list
(16584) 1992 PM	8 August 1992	list
(16586) 1992 RZ_{6}	2 September 1992	list
(16597) 1992 YU_{1}	18 December 1992	list
16598 Brugmansia	18 December 1992	list
(16630) 1993 NZ_{1}	12 July 1993	list
(16631) 1993 OY_{3}	20 July 1993	list
(16632) 1993 OH_{4}	20 July 1993	list
(16633) 1993 OV_{5}	20 July 1993	list
(16634) 1993 OD_{8}	20 July 1993	list
(16637) 1993 QP_{2}	16 August 1993	list
(16638) 1993 QN_{3}	18 August 1993	list
(16639) 1993 QD_{4}	18 August 1993	list
(16640) 1993 QU_{9}	20 August 1993	list
(16642) 1993 RK_{4}	15 September 1993	list
(16643) 1993 RV_{15}	15 September 1993	list^{[E]}
16646 Sparrman	19 September 1993	list
16647 Robbydesmet	17 September 1993	list

Name	Discovery Date	Listing
16648 Hossi	17 September 1993	list
(16653) 1993 TP_{19}	9 October 1993	list
(16654) 1993 TY_{29}	9 October 1993	list
(16655) 1993 TS_{33}	9 October 1993	list
(16656) 1993 TP_{37}	9 October 1993	list
(16660) 1993 US_{7}	20 October 1993	list
(16664) 1993 VO_{4}	9 November 1993	list
16674 Birkeland	16 January 1994	list^{[D]}
(16677) 1994 CT_{11}	7 February 1994	list
(16678) 1994 CC_{18}	8 February 1994	list
(16686) 1994 PL_{9}	10 August 1994	list
(16687) 1994 PN_{20}	12 August 1994	list
(16688) 1994 PN_{21}	12 August 1994	list
16689 Vistula	12 August 1994	list
(16728) 1996 GB_{18}	15 April 1996	list
(16729) 1996 GA_{19}	15 April 1996	list
(16732) 1996 HZ_{16}	18 April 1996	list
(16734) 1996 HZ_{22}	20 April 1996	list
16740 Kipthorne	22 May 1996	list
(16741) 1996 NZ_{3}	14 July 1996	list
(16747) 1996 PS_{8}	8 August 1996	list
(16748) 1996 PD_{9}	8 August 1996	list
(16798) 1997 EL_{50}	5 March 1997	list
(16800) 1997 JQ_{16}	3 May 1997	list
16908 Groeselenberg	17 February 1998	list^{[F]}

Name	Discovery Date	Listing
16909 Miladejager	27 February 1998	list
(16910) 1998 DE_{34}	27 February 1998	list
(16914) 1998 ER_{13}	1 March 1998	list
(16957) 1998 ON_{13}	26 July 1998	list
(17410) 1988 CQ_{4}	13 February 1988	list
17427 Poe	4 February 1989	list
(17429) 1989 GD_{1}	3 April 1989	list
17431 Sainte-Colombe	3 September 1989	list
(17433) 1989 SV_{2}	26 September 1989	list
(17434) 1989 SN_{3}	26 September 1989	list
17435 di Giovanni	26 September 1989	list
(17436) 1989 SV_{3}	26 September 1989	list
17437 Stekene	26 September 1989	list
17438 Quasimodo	26 September 1989	list
17439 Juliesan	7 October 1989	list
(17444) 1989 VQ_{1}	3 November 1989	list
17445 Avatcha	28 December 1989	list
(17451) 1990 QF_{8}	16 August 1990	list
17452 Amurreka	16 August 1990	list
(17454) 1990 SA_{7}	22 September 1990	list
(17455) 1990 SH_{7}	22 September 1990	list
(17456) 1990 SS_{7}	22 September 1990	list
(17463) 1990 UO_{5}	16 October 1990	list
17466 Vargasllosa	15 November 1990	list
(17467) 1990 VE_{6}	15 November 1990	list

Name	Discovery Date	Listing
(17468) 1990 WT_{6}	21 November 1990	list
(17474) 1991 GK_{5}	8 April 1991	list
(17475) 1991 GA_{7}	8 April 1991	list
(17476) 1991 GG_{7}	8 April 1991	list
(17477) 1991 GN_{9}	10 April 1991	list
(17504) 1992 GB_{2}	4 April 1992	list
(17505) 1992 GO_{2}	4 April 1992	list
17506 Walschap	4 April 1992	list
17519 Pritsak	18 December 1992	list
17521 Kiek	27 January 1993	list
(17522) 1993 BL_{7}	23 January 1993	list
(17541) 1993 OL_{5}	20 July 1993	list
(17542) 1993 OW_{6}	20 July 1993	list
17543 Sosva	14 August 1993	list
(17545) 1993 RZ_{3}	15 September 1993	list
(17548) 1993 SX_{6}	17 September 1993	list
(17550) 1993 TO_{18}	9 October 1993	list
(17551) 1993 TZ_{31}	9 October 1993	list
(17552) 1993 TZ_{36}	9 October 1993	list
(17553) 1993 UQ_{5}	20 October 1993	list
(17562) 1994 BG_{4}	16 January 1994	list^{[D]}
(17566) 1994 CE_{11}	7 February 1994	list
(17569) 1994 LB_{8}	8 June 1994	list^{[E]}
(17572) 1994 PX_{11}	10 August 1994	list
(17573) 1994 PJ_{13}	10 August 1994	list

Name	Discovery Date	Listing
(17574) 1994 PT_{13}	10 August 1994	list
(17575) 1994 PQ_{14}	10 August 1994	list
(17576) 1994 PL_{25}	12 August 1994	list
(17577) 1994 PD_{38}	10 August 1994	list
(17630) 1996 HM_{21}	18 April 1996	list
(17634) 1996 NM_{3}	14 July 1996	list
(17647) 1996 TR_{41}	8 October 1996	list
17700 Oleksiygolubov	7 April 1997	list
(17701) 1997 GU_{41}	9 April 1997	list
(17760) 1998 DU_{33}	27 February 1998	list
(17761) 1998 DV_{34}	27 February 1998	list
(17762) 1998 DY_{34}	27 February 1998	list
17770 Baumé	1 March 1998	list
17771 Elsheimer	1 March 1998	list
(17772) 1998 EP_{13}	1 March 1998	list
(17773) 1998 EX_{13}	1 March 1998	list
(17774) 1998 ER_{14}	1 March 1998	list
(18330) 1987 BW_{1}	25 January 1987	list
(18339) 1989 GM_{2}	3 April 1989	list
(18341) 1989 SJ_{5}	26 September 1989	list
18343 Asja	2 October 1989	list
(18352) 1990 QB_{8}	16 August 1990	list
(18353) 1990 QF_{9}	16 August 1990	list
(18361) 1990 VN_{6}	15 November 1990	list
(18362) 1990 VX_{6}	15 November 1990	list

Name	Discovery Date	Listing
(18363) 1990 VW_{8}	12 November 1990	list
(18364) 1990 WF_{4}	16 November 1990	list
18379 Josévandam	6 November 1991	list
18381 Massenet	30 December 1991	list
(18387) 1992 GN_{3}	4 April 1992	list
(18388) 1992 GX_{4}	4 April 1992	list
(18391) 1992 PO_{1}	8 August 1992	list
(18394) 1992 RR_{5}	2 September 1992	list
(18414) 1993 OY_{6}	20 July 1993	list
(18415) 1993 PW_{5}	15 August 1993	list
(18417) 1993 QY_{9}	20 August 1993	list
(18419) 1993 TS_{20}	9 October 1993	list
(18420) 1993 TR_{25}	9 October 1993	list
(18421) 1993 TV_{34}	9 October 1993	list
(18422) 1993 UE_{6}	20 October 1993	list
(18423) 1993 UF_{7}	20 October 1993	list
(18440) 1994 NV_{1}	8 July 1994	list
(18442) 1994 PK_{3}	10 August 1994	list
(18443) 1994 PW_{8}	10 August 1994	list
(18444) 1994 PL_{10}	10 August 1994	list
(18445) 1994 PC_{12}	10 August 1994	list
(18446) 1994 PN_{13}	10 August 1994	list
(18447) 1994 PU_{13}	10 August 1994	list
(18448) 1994 PW_{17}	10 August 1994	list
18449 Rikwouters	12 August 1994	list

Name	Discovery Date	Listing
(18450) 1994 PG_{27}	12 August 1994	list
(18451) 1994 PZ_{27}	12 August 1994	list
(18452) 1994 PL_{33}	10 August 1994	list
(18471) 1995 UZ_{45}	20 October 1995	list
18493 Demoleon	17 April 1996	list
(18494) 1996 HH_{10}	17 April 1996	list
(18495) 1996 HH_{24}	20 April 1996	list
(18500) 1996 NX_{3}	14 July 1996	list
18562 Ellenkey	8 March 1997	list
18611 Baudelaire	6 February 1998	list
(18612) 1998 CK_{3}	6 February 1998	list
(18629) 1998 DZ_{33}	27 February 1998	list
(18630) 1998 DT_{34}	27 February 1998	list
(18642) 1998 EF_{12}	1 March 1998	list
18643 van Rysselberghe	1 March 1998	list
(18645) 1998 EM_{19}	3 March 1998	list
(18646) 1998 ED_{21}	3 March 1998	list
(18722) 1998 HF_{148}	25 April 1998	list
(19125) 1987 CH	2 February 1987	list
(19128) 1987 YR_{1}	17 December 1987	list^{[B]}
19130 Tytgat	11 February 1988	list
(19131) 1988 CY_{3}	13 February 1988	list
19132 Le Clézio	13 February 1988	list
19137 Copiapó	4 February 1989	list
19141 Poelkapelle	26 September 1989	list

Name	Discovery Date	Listing
19142 Langemarck	26 September 1989	list
19148 Alaska	28 December 1989	list
19149 Boccaccio	2 March 1990	list
(19157) 1990 SS_{6}	22 September 1990	list
(19158) 1990 SN_{7}	22 September 1990	list
(19163) 1990 WE_{5}	16 November 1990	list
19175 Peterpiot	2 August 1991	list
(19176) 1991 PK_{3}	2 August 1991	list
19188 Dittebesard	30 December 1991	list
(19200) 1992 GU_{2}	4 April 1992	list
(19201) 1992 GZ_{4}	4 April 1992	list
(19205) 1992 PT	8 August 1992	list
(19219) 1993 OH_{5}	20 July 1993	list
(19220) 1993 OX_{11}	19 July 1993	list
(19221) 1993 PD_{3}	14 August 1993	list
(19222) 1993 QK_{1}	16 August 1993	list
(19223) 1993 QH_{8}	20 August 1993	list
(19225) 1993 RX_{5}	15 September 1993	list
19226 Peiresc	15 September 1993	list
(19227) 1993 RH_{16}	15 September 1993	list^{[E]}
(19229) 1993 SD_{5}	19 September 1993	list
(19232) 1993 TJ_{15}	9 October 1993	list
(19233) 1993 UD_{7}	20 October 1993	list
19235 van Schurman	9 November 1993	list
(19241) 1994 BH_{4}	16 January 1994	list^{[D]}

Name	Discovery Date	Listing
(19244) 1994 CX_{12}	7 February 1994	list
(19249) 1994 PO_{25}	12 August 1994	list
19250 Poullain	12 August 1994	list
(19253) 1994 RN_{28}	5 September 1994	list
(19289) 1996 HY_{12}	17 April 1996	list
(19292) 1996 NG_{5}	14 July 1996	list
(19360) 1997 JS_{12}	3 May 1997	list
19386 Axelcronstedt	6 February 1998	list
19393 Davidthompson	27 February 1998	list
(19394) 1998 DA_{34}	27 February 1998	list
(19399) 1998 EP_{10}	1 March 1998	list
19400 Emileclaus	1 March 1998	list
(19401) 1998 ES_{11}	1 March 1998	list
(19402) 1998 EG_{14}	1 March 1998	list
(19481) 1998 HX_{101}	25 April 1998	list
19482 Harperlee	25 April 1998	list
(19489) 1998 HL_{149}	25 April 1998	list
19504 Vladalekseev	1 June 1998	list
(19510) 1998 MV_{42}	26 June 1998	list
19517 Robertocarlos	18 September 1998	list
(19964) 1987 BX_{1}	25 January 1987	list
(19974) 1989 GR_{1}	3 April 1989	list
(19975) 1989 GX_{2}	3 April 1989	list
(19978) 1989 TN_{6}	7 October 1989	list
19981 Bialystock	29 December 1989	list

Name	Discovery Date	Listing
(19984) 1990 EP_{2}	2 March 1990	list
(19985) 1990 GD	15 April 1990	list
(19990) 1990 SE_{8}	22 September 1990	list
(19991) 1990 SW_{8}	22 September 1990	list
(19995) 1990 VU_{8}	12 November 1990	list
(19996) 1990 WZ	18 November 1990	list
(19997) 1990 WM_{1}	18 November 1990	list
19998 Binoche	18 November 1990	list
19999 Depardieu	18 January 1991	list
20004 Audrey-Lucienne	8 April 1991	list
(20005) 1991 GL_{7}	8 April 1991	list
(20010) 1991 PN_{2}	2 August 1991	list
(20021) 1991 VM_{6}	6 November 1991	list
20024 Mayrémartínez	30 January 1992	list
(20032) 1992 PU	8 August 1992	list
(20033) 1992 PR_{1}	8 August 1992	list
20044 Vitoux	23 March 1993	list
20058 Bundalian	20 July 1993	list
(20059) 1993 OY_{9}	20 July 1993	list
20060 Johannforster	15 August 1993	list
20061 Bilitza	16 August 1993	list
20063 Kanakoseki	15 September 1993	list
20064 Prahladagrawal	15 September 1993	list
20065 Kminek	15 September 1993	list
(20067) 1993 TN_{24}	9 October 1993	list

Name	Discovery Date	Listing
(20068) 1993 TE_{34}	9 October 1993	list
(20069) 1993 TD_{37}	9 October 1993	list
(20077) 1994 CX_{9}	7 February 1994	list
(20078) 1994 CO_{16}	8 February 1994	list
(20082) 1994 EG_{7}	9 March 1994	list
(20087) 1994 PC_{7}	10 August 1994	list
(20088) 1994 PQ_{10}	10 August 1994	list
(20089) 1994 PA_{14}	10 August 1994	list
(20090) 1994 PN_{16}	10 August 1994	list
(20091) 1994 PK_{20}	12 August 1994	list
(20092) 1994 PL_{22}	12 August 1994	list
(20093) 1994 PN_{22}	12 August 1994	list
(20094) 1994 PS_{26}	12 August 1994	list
(20095) 1994 PG_{35}	10 August 1994	list
(20137) 1996 PX_{8}	8 August 1996	list
(20160) 1996 TH_{42}	8 October 1996	list
(20220) 1997 GA_{40}	7 April 1997	list
20224 Johnrae	3 May 1997	list
20237 Clavius	6 February 1998	list
20243 Den Bosch	25 February 1998	list
(20249) 1998 EM_{10}	1 March 1998	list
(20250) 1998 EP_{11}	1 March 1998	list
(20251) 1998 EA_{12}	1 March 1998	list
20252 Eyjafjallajökull	1 March 1998	list
(20344) 1998 HF_{103}	25 April 1998	list
20358 Dalem	25 April 1998	list
(20404) 1998 OB_{14}	26 July 1998	list
(20418) 1998 SH_{71}	21 September 1998	list
21000 L'Encyclopédie	26 January 1987	list
(21002) 1987 QU_{7}	29 August 1987	list
(21003) 1987 YV_{1}	17 December 1987	list^{[B]}
(21006) 1988 DG_{2}	17 February 1988	list
21009 Agilkia	12 August 1988	list
(21024) 1989 GD_{3}	3 April 1989	list
(21025) 1989 SL_{2}	26 September 1989	list
(21026) 1989 SE_{4}	26 September 1989	list
(21027) 1989 SR_{5}	28 September 1989	list
21029 Adorno	7 October 1989	list
(21038) 1990 EP_{3}	2 March 1990	list
(21039) 1990 ES_{4}	2 March 1990	list
(21042) 1990 QT_{7}	16 August 1990	list
21047 Hodierna	22 September 1990	list
(21048) 1990 SV_{9}	22 September 1990	list
(21052) 1990 UG_{5}	16 October 1990	list
21054 Ojmjakon	15 November 1990	list
21057 Garikisraelian	8 April 1991	list
(21058) 1991 GF_{9}	10 April 1991	list
21064 Yangliwei	6 June 1991	list
(21067) 1991 PY_{1}	2 August 1991	list
(21068) 1991 PL_{2}	2 August 1991	list
(21069) 1991 PY_{3}	3 August 1991	list
(21070) 1991 PD_{6}	6 August 1991	list
(21071) 1991 PE_{7}	6 August 1991	list
21087 Petsimpallas	30 January 1992	list
21088 Chelyabinsk	30 January 1992	list
(21099) 1992 GM_{2}	4 April 1992	list
(21102) 1992 OF_{2}	26 July 1992	list
(21103) 1992 OB_{3}	26 July 1992	list
21104 Sveshnikov	8 August 1992	list
(21105) 1992 PU_{1}	8 August 1992	list
(21111) 1992 RP_{3}	2 September 1992	list
(21112) 1992 RY_{3}	2 September 1992	list
(21113) 1992 RG_{4}	2 September 1992	list
21114 Bernson	2 September 1992	list
(21115) 1992 RL_{7}	2 September 1992	list
(21123) 1992 YP_{2}	18 December 1992	list
(21124) 1992 YR_{2}	18 December 1992	list
(21127) 1993 BF_{4}	27 January 1993	list
21128 Chapuis	27 January 1993	list
(21129) 1993 BJ_{7}	23 January 1993	list
(21154) 1993 NS_{1}	12 July 1993	list
(21155) 1993 NW_{1}	12 July 1993	list
(21156) 1993 QP_{7}	20 August 1993	list
(21157) 1993 RC_{5}	15 September 1993	list
(21158) 1993 RP_{18}	15 September 1993	list^{[E]}
(21159) 1993 ST_{5}	17 September 1993	list
(21162) 1993 TW_{16}	9 October 1993	list
(21163) 1993 TJ_{24}	9 October 1993	list
(21164) 1993 UZ_{7}	20 October 1993	list
(21172) 1994 CK_{10}	7 February 1994	list
(21173) 1994 CU_{10}	7 February 1994	list
(21174) 1994 CG_{12}	7 February 1994	list
(21175) 1994 CP_{12}	7 February 1994	list
(21176) 1994 CN_{13}	8 February 1994	list
(21177) 1994 CC_{17}	8 February 1994	list
(21178) 1994 CJ_{17}	8 February 1994	list
(21179) 1994 CL_{18}	8 February 1994	list
(21185) 1994 EH_{6}	9 March 1994	list
(21186) 1994 EO_{6}	9 March 1994	list
(21195) 1994 PK_{4}	10 August 1994	list
(21196) 1994 PU_{5}	10 August 1994	list
(21197) 1994 PS_{7}	10 August 1994	list
(21198) 1994 PX_{7}	10 August 1994	list
(21199) 1994 PV_{8}	10 August 1994	list
(21200) 1994 PU_{10}	10 August 1994	list
(21201) 1994 PO_{18}	12 August 1994	list
(21202) 1994 PW_{19}	12 August 1994	list
(21203) 1994 PP_{20}	12 August 1994	list
(21204) 1994 PH_{26}	12 August 1994	list
(21205) 1994 PV_{27}	12 August 1994	list
(21206) 1994 PT_{28}	12 August 1994	list
(21207) 1994 PH_{29}	12 August 1994	list
(21208) 1994 PW_{29}	12 August 1994	list
(21209) 1994 PO_{30}	12 August 1994	list
(21210) 1994 PA_{31}	12 August 1994	list
(21211) 1994 PP_{36}	10 August 1994	list
(21212) 1994 PG_{39}	10 August 1994	list
(21263) 1996 HJ_{11}	17 April 1996	list
(21264) 1996 HT_{16}	18 April 1996	list
(21265) 1996 HJ_{23}	20 April 1996	list
(21266) 1996 HL_{25}	20 April 1996	list
21284 Pandion	5 October 1996	list
(21352) 1997 EB_{57}	10 March 1997	list
(21366) 1997 JT_{15}	3 May 1997	list
(21378) 1998 CJ_{4}	6 February 1998	list
(21486) 1998 HA_{148}	25 April 1998	list
(21487) 1998 HV_{148}	25 April 1998	list
(21533) 1998 OR_{12}	26 July 1998	list
(21534) 1998 OV_{12}	26 July 1998	list
(21535) 1998 OX_{13}	26 July 1998	list
(21536) 1998 OV_{14}	26 July 1998	list
21564 Widmanstätten	26 August 1998	list
(21565) 1998 QZ_{102}	26 August 1998	list
(21566) 1998 QM_{103}	26 August 1998	list
22283 Pytheas	6 August 1986	list^{[A]}
(22285) 1987 RR	3 September 1987	list
(22292) 1989 SM_{1}	26 September 1989	list
(22293) 1989 SK_{4}	26 September 1989	list
(22296) 1989 TW_{4}	7 October 1989	list
22299 Georgesteiner	15 April 1990	list
(22308) 1990 UO_{4}	16 October 1990	list
(22309) 1990 VO_{4}	15 November 1990	list
(22310) 1990 WU_{1}	18 November 1990	list
(22313) 1991 GP_{3}	8 April 1991	list
(22314) 1991 GV_{3}	8 April 1991	list
(22315) 1991 GA_{4}	8 April 1991	list
(22316) 1991 LO_{1}	6 June 1991	list
(22317) 1991 LL_{2}	6 June 1991	list
(22319) 1991 PX_{6}	6 August 1991	list
(22329) 1991 VT_{5}	2 November 1991	list
(22330) 1991 VU_{5}	2 November 1991	list
(22339) 1992 OL_{3}	26 July 1992	list
(22340) 1992 OM_{6}	30 July 1992	list
22341 Francispoulenc	8 August 1992	list
(22342) 1992 RW_{2}	2 September 1992	list
(22343) 1992 RM_{5}	2 September 1992	list
(22344) 1992 RJ_{7}	2 September 1992	list
(22368) 1993 PV_{3}	14 August 1993	list
(22371) 1993 TA_{16}	9 October 1993	list
(22372) 1993 TD_{28}	9 October 1993	list
(22373) 1993 TJ_{31}	9 October 1993	list
(22374) 1993 TX_{33}	9 October 1993	list
(22375) 1993 TF_{34}	9 October 1993	list
(22376) 1993 TX_{38}	9 October 1993	list
(22377) 1993 UW_{6}	20 October 1993	list
(22380) 1994 CF_{10}	7 February 1994	list
(22381) 1994 CN_{10}	7 February 1994	list
(22382) 1994 CY_{16}	8 February 1994	list
(22384) 1994 EZ_{6}	9 March 1994	list
(22386) 1994 PF_{14}	10 August 1994	list
(22387) 1994 PN_{14}	10 August 1994	list
(22388) 1994 PC_{15}	10 August 1994	list
(22389) 1994 PC_{21}	12 August 1994	list
(22390) 1994 PA_{23}	12 August 1994	list
(22391) 1994 PE_{26}	12 August 1994	list
(22392) 1994 PT_{27}	12 August 1994	list
(22436) 1996 GO_{17}	15 April 1996	list
(22437) 1996 GR_{20}	15 April 1996	list
(22438) 1996 HQ_{19}	18 April 1996	list
(22439) 1996 HL_{20}	18 April 1996	list
(22441) 1996 PA_{9}	8 August 1996	list
(22478) 1997 EM_{48}	11 March 1997	list
(22493) 1997 GP_{40}	7 April 1997	list
(22496) 1997 JH_{13}	3 May 1997	list
(22518) 1998 DG_{34}	27 February 1998	list
(22523) 1998 EZ_{10}	1 March 1998	list
(22590) 1998 HJ_{102}	25 April 1998	list
(22591) 1998 HO_{102}	25 April 1998	list
(22592) 1998 HD_{103}	25 April 1998	list
(22606) 1998 HK_{148}	25 April 1998	list
(22607) 1998 HD_{149}	25 April 1998	list
(22646) 1998 OB_{8}	26 July 1998	list
22647 Lévi-Strauss	26 July 1998	list
(22648) 1998 OG_{9}	26 July 1998	list
(22691) 1998 QD_{99}	26 August 1998	list
22692 Carfrekahl	26 August 1998	list
(22693) 1998 QF_{102}	26 August 1998	list
22694 Tyndall	26 August 1998	list
(22695) 1998 QQ_{104}	26 August 1998	list
(22696) 1998 QT_{105}	25 August 1998	list
(22726) 1998 SZ_{72}	21 September 1998	list
22739 Sikhote-Alin	18 September 1998	list
22740 Rayleigh	20 September 1998	list
(22751) 1998 UA_{27}	18 October 1998	list
(23445) 1987 QY_{7}	21 August 1987	list
(23446) 1987 SJ_{2}	19 September 1987	list
23450 Birkenstock	13 February 1988	list
(23451) 1988 CO_{7}	15 February 1988	list
(23459) 1989 ST_{4}	26 September 1989	list
(23461) 1989 TM_{4}	7 October 1989	list
(23462) 1989 TU_{4}	7 October 1989	list
(23470) 1990 SO_{8}	22 September 1990	list
23477 Wallenstadt	18 November 1990	list
(23481) 1991 GT_{4}	8 April 1991	list
(23483) 1991 LV_{4}	6 June 1991	list
(23486) 1991 PE_{2}	2 August 1991	list
(23487) 1991 PX_{4}	3 August 1991	list
(23498) 1991 VH_{6}	6 November 1991	list
(23515) 1992 RF_{2}	2 September 1992	list
(23516) 1992 RK_{2}	2 September 1992	list
(23517) 1992 RO_{3}	2 September 1992	list
(23532) 1993 JG_{1}	14 May 1993	list
(23533) 1993 PU_{5}	15 August 1993	list
(23534) 1993 QP_{3}	18 August 1993	list
(23535) 1993 QL_{7}	20 August 1993	list
(23536) 1993 QS_{9}	20 August 1993	list
(23537) 1993 SA_{6}	17 September 1993	list
(23538) 1993 TM_{15}	9 October 1993	list
(23539) 1993 TU_{15}	9 October 1993	list
(23540) 1993 TV_{19}	9 October 1993	list
(23541) 1993 TU_{29}	9 October 1993	list
(23542) 1993 TN_{30}	9 October 1993	list
23549 Epicles	9 March 1994	list
(23553) 1994 PL_{4}	10 August 1994	list
(23554) 1994 PJ_{11}	10 August 1994	list
(23555) 1994 PP_{15}	10 August 1994	list
(23556) 1994 PY_{25}	12 August 1994	list
(23557) 1994 PU_{26}	12 August 1994	list
(23558) 1994 PW_{26}	12 August 1994	list
(23559) 1994 PD_{32}	12 August 1994	list
(23616) 1996 HY_{10}	17 April 1996	list
23617 Duna	17 April 1996	list
(23665) 1997 EU_{46}	12 March 1997	list
(23682) 1997 GT_{40}	7 April 1997	list
23688 Josephjoachim	3 May 1997	list
23689 Jancuypers	3 May 1997	list
23691 Jefneve	3 May 1997	list
(23736) 1998 HO_{148}	25 April 1998	list
(23839) 1998 QO_{100}	26 August 1998	list
(23840) 1998 QP_{100}	26 August 1998	list
(23841) 1998 QG_{102}	26 August 1998	list
(23842) 1998 QM_{106}	25 August 1998	list
(23843) 1998 QU_{106}	25 August 1998	list
(23902) 1998 SN_{64}	20 September 1998	list
(23903) 1998 SK_{65}	20 September 1998	list
(23905) 1998 SQ_{70}	21 September 1998	list
(23906) 1998 SB_{72}	21 September 1998	list
(23907) 1998 SH_{72}	21 September 1998	list
(23927) 1998 SS_{144}	20 September 1998	list
(23929) 1998 SU_{163}	18 September 1998	list
(23930) 1998 SX_{163}	18 September 1998	list
(23951) 1998 UX_{25}	18 October 1998	list
(23952) 1998 UU_{28}	18 October 1998	list
(23953) 1998 UV_{30}	18 October 1998	list
(24656) 1987 QT_{7}	29 August 1987	list
24663 Philae	12 August 1988	list
(24674) 1989 SZ_{4}	26 September 1989	list
(24676) 1989 TA_{4}	7 October 1989	list
(24677) 1989 TH_{7}	7 October 1989	list
24679 Van Rensbergen	3 November 1989	list
24681 Granados	29 December 1989	list
(24684) 1990 EU_{4}	2 March 1990	list
(24686) 1990 GN	15 April 1990	list
(24696) 1990 SC_{8}	22 September 1990	list
(24700) 1990 VN_{5}	15 November 1990	list
24701 Elyu-Ene	15 November 1990	list
(24704) 1991 PM_{4}	3 August 1991	list
(24705) 1991 PV_{4}	3 August 1991	list
(24706) 1991 PA_{5}	3 August 1991	list
(24707) 1991 PL_{5}	3 August 1991	list
(24708) 1991 PX_{5}	6 August 1991	list
24709 Mitau	6 August 1991	list
24732 Leonardcohen	2 February 1992	list
(24742) 1992 GN_{2}	4 April 1992	list
(24744) 1992 OD_{5}	26 July 1992	list
(24746) 1992 RH_{3}	2 September 1992	list
(24747) 1992 RG_{5}	2 September 1992	list
(24760) 1992 YY_{1}	18 December 1992	list
(24763) 1993 DV_{2}	20 February 1993	list
(24764) 1993 DX_{2}	20 February 1993	list
(24777) 1993 JY	14 May 1993	list
(24782) 1993 SO_{7}	17 September 1993	list
(24783) 1993 SQ_{13}	16 September 1993	list^{[E]}
(24785) 1993 TM_{22}	9 October 1993	list
(24786) 1993 TM_{24}	9 October 1993	list
(24787) 1993 TJ_{27}	9 October 1993	list
(24788) 1993 TL_{28}	9 October 1993	list
(24789) 1993 TZ_{29}	9 October 1993	list
(24790) 1993 TM_{31}	9 October 1993	list
(24791) 1993 TK_{37}	9 October 1993	list
24794 Kurland	20 October 1993	list
(24796) 1994 CD_{18}	8 February 1994	list
(24799) 1994 PW_{3}	10 August 1994	list
(24800) 1994 PC_{13}	10 August 1994	list
(24801) 1994 PQ_{15}	10 August 1994	list
(24802) 1994 PC_{16}	10 August 1994	list
(24803) 1994 PP_{18}	12 August 1994	list
(24804) 1994 PS_{31}	12 August 1994	list
(24842) 1995 UQ_{46}	20 October 1995	list
(24871) 1996 GV_{17}	15 April 1996	list
(24872) 1996 GT_{19}	15 April 1996	list
(24873) 1996 GG_{20}	15 April 1996	list
(24874) 1996 HF_{14}	17 April 1996	list
(24875) 1996 HX_{16}	18 April 1996	list
(24876) 1996 HO_{19}	18 April 1996	list
(24877) 1996 HW_{20}	18 April 1996	list
(24878) 1996 HP_{25}	20 April 1996	list
(24941) 1997 JM_{14}	3 May 1997	list
(24942) 1997 JA_{15}	3 May 1997	list
(24943) 1997 JY_{17}	3 May 1997	list
24945 Houziaux	7 June 1997	list
(25002) 1998 OP_{7}	26 July 1998	list
(25003) 1998 OZ_{8}	26 July 1998	list
(25004) 1998 OF_{10}	26 July 1998	list
(25005) 1998 OU_{12}	26 July 1998	list
(25006) 1998 OD_{13}	26 July 1998	list
(25077) 1998 QJ_{99}	26 August 1998	list
(25078) 1998 QV_{99}	26 August 1998	list
(25079) 1998 QU_{103}	26 August 1998	list
(25080) 1998 QX_{103}	26 August 1998	list
(25167) 1998 SO_{64}	20 September 1998	list
(25168) 1998 SC_{65}	20 September 1998	list
(25169) 1998 SR_{65}	20 September 1998	list
(25170) 1998 SB_{66}	20 September 1998	list
(25171) 1998 SX_{66}	20 September 1998	list
(25172) 1998 SF_{67}	20 September 1998	list
(25173) 1998 SN_{71}	21 September 1998	list
(25174) 1998 SQ_{72}	21 September 1998	list
(25203) 1998 SP_{143}	18 September 1998	list
(25204) 1998 SP_{144}	20 September 1998	list
(25205) 1998 SQ_{144}	20 September 1998	list
(25206) 1998 SX_{145}	20 September 1998	list
(25207) 1998 SY_{145}	20 September 1998	list
(25208) 1998 SK_{146}	20 September 1998	list
(25209) 1998 SO_{146}	20 September 1998	list
(25210) 1998 SE_{147}	20 September 1998	list
(25211) 1998 SU_{147}	20 September 1998	list
(25215) 1998 SC_{164}	18 September 1998	list
(25251) 1998 UL_{25}	18 October 1998	list
(25252) 1998 UC_{26}	18 October 1998	list
(25253) 1998 UV_{29}	18 October 1998	list
(26101) 1990 QQ_{6}	20 August 1990	list
(26102) 1990 QA_{9}	16 August 1990	list
(26105) 1990 VH_{5}	15 November 1990	list
(26106) 1990 WJ_{2}	18 November 1990	list
(26107) 1991 GZ_{5}	8 April 1991	list
(26108) 1991 LF_{2}	6 June 1991	list
(26109) 1991 LJ_{3}	6 June 1991	list
26122 Antonysutton	2 February 1992	list
(26126) 1992 RD_{2}	2 September 1992	list
(26136) 1993 OK_{7}	20 July 1993	list
(26137) 1993 QV_{1}	16 August 1993	list
(26138) 1993 TK_{25}	9 October 1993	list
(26139) 1993 TK_{32}	9 October 1993	list
(26140) 1994 CX_{10}	7 February 1994	list
(26143) 1994 PF_{5}	10 August 1994	list
(26144) 1994 PG_{7}	10 August 1994	list
(26145) 1994 PG_{18}	12 August 1994	list
(26146) 1994 PF_{27}	12 August 1994	list
(26147) 1994 PS_{32}	12 August 1994	list
(26148) 1994 PN_{37}	10 August 1994	list
(26149) 1994 PU_{37}	10 August 1994	list
(26182) 1996 HW_{8}	17 April 1996	list
26183 Henrigodard	17 April 1996	list
(26184) 1996 HC_{25}	20 April 1996	list
(26202) 1997 GD_{42}	9 April 1997	list
(26286) 1998 SV_{65}	20 September 1998	list
(26287) 1998 SD_{67}	20 September 1998	list
(26288) 1998 SA_{73}	21 September 1998	list
(26289) 1998 SL_{74}	21 September 1998	list
(26303) 1998 SD_{144}	18 September 1998	list
(26304) 1998 SZ_{145}	20 September 1998	list
(26305) 1998 SH_{146}	20 September 1998	list
(26306) 1998 SX_{147}	20 September 1998	list
(26320) 1998 UD_{27}	18 October 1998	list
(26820) 1987 SR_{9}	20 September 1987	list
(26826) 1989 TQ_{7}	7 October 1989	list
(26832) 1990 QT_{6}	20 August 1990	list
(26836) 1991 PA_{6}	6 August 1991	list
(26840) 1991 RP_{12}	4 September 1991	list
(26846) 1992 CG_{3}	2 February 1992	list
26849 De Paepe	23 April 1992	list
26851 Sarapul	30 July 1992	list
(26856) 1993 BT_{14}	23 January 1993	list
26857 Veracruz	19 February 1993	list
(26869) 1993 SR_{6}	17 September 1993	list
(26870) 1993 TP_{28}	9 October 1993	list
26871 Tanezrouft	9 October 1993	list
(26876) 1994 CR_{14}	8 February 1994	list
(26877) 1994 ED_{6}	9 March 1994	list
(26878) 1994 EY_{6}	9 March 1994	list
(26880) 1994 PK_{8}	10 August 1994	list
(26881) 1994 PF_{11}	10 August 1994	list
(26882) 1994 PY_{21}	12 August 1994	list
26883 Marcelproust	12 August 1994	list
(26910) 1996 HU_{25}	20 April 1996	list
26922 Samara	8 October 1996	list
(26936) 1997 EL_{47}	12 March 1997	list
(26951) 1997 JZ_{15}	3 May 1997	list
(26952) 1997 JF_{16}	3 May 1997	list
(27020) 1998 OQ_{10}	26 July 1998	list
(27021) 1998 OQ_{14}	26 July 1998	list
(27029) 1998 QP_{105}	25 August 1998	list
(27030) 1998 QW_{105}	25 August 1998	list
(27064) 1998 SY_{63}	20 September 1998	list
(27065) 1998 SJ_{64}	20 September 1998	list
(27066) 1998 SZ_{64}	20 September 1998	list
(27067) 1998 SS_{67}	20 September 1998	list
(27068) 1998 SU_{74}	21 September 1998	list
(27069) 1998 SK_{75}	21 September 1998	list
(27075) 1998 SY_{143}	18 September 1998	list
(27076) 1998 ST_{146}	20 September 1998	list
(27097) 1998 UM_{26}	18 October 1998	list
27709 Orenburg	13 February 1988	list
(27717) 1989 CF_{3}	4 February 1989	list
27718 Gouda	2 April 1989	list
27719 Fast	26 September 1989	list
27724 Jeannoel	21 August 1990	list
(27727) 1990 QM_{7}	20 August 1990	list
(27728) 1990 QD_{8}	16 August 1990	list
(27729) 1990 QK_{9}	16 August 1990	list
(27735) 1990 SZ_{5}	22 September 1990	list
27736 Ekaterinburg	22 September 1990	list
(27737) 1990 SA_{8}	22 September 1990	list
(27741) 1990 UJ_{4}	16 October 1990	list
(27742) 1990 UP_{4}	16 October 1990	list
(27744) 1990 VO_{6}	15 November 1990	list
(27745) 1990 WS	18 November 1990	list
(27746) 1990 WE_{3}	18 November 1990	list
(27752) 1991 GL_{8}	8 April 1991	list
(27753) 1991 PF_{5}	3 August 1991	list
(27772) 1991 VD_{6}	2 November 1991	list
(27774) 1991 YB_{1}	29 December 1991	list
27775 Lilialmanzor	2 February 1992	list
(27783) 1992 GV_{3}	4 April 1992	list
(27785) 1992 OE_{3}	26 July 1992	list
(27786) 1992 PN_{1}	8 August 1992	list
27789 Astrakhan	23 January 1993	list
27792 Fridakahlo	20 February 1993	list
(27811) 1993 OA_{7}	20 July 1993	list
(27812) 1993 OJ_{8}	20 July 1993	list
(27813) 1993 PS_{3}	14 August 1993	list
(27817) 1993 TO_{17}	9 October 1993	list
(27818) 1993 TH_{24}	9 October 1993	list
(27819) 1993 TG_{27}	9 October 1993	list
(27820) 1993 TD_{34}	9 October 1993	list
(27821) 1993 TU_{34}	9 October 1993	list
(27823) 1993 UC_{8}	20 October 1993	list
(27824) 1993 UD_{8}	20 October 1993	list
(27830) 1994 CK_{14}	8 February 1994	list
(27833) 1994 PB_{4}	10 August 1994	list
(27834) 1994 PW_{13}	10 August 1994	list
(27835) 1994 PZ_{13}	10 August 1994	list
(27836) 1994 PQ_{16}	10 August 1994	list
(27837) 1994 PU_{16}	10 August 1994	list
(27838) 1994 PU_{20}	12 August 1994	list
(27839) 1994 PX_{20}	12 August 1994	list
(27840) 1994 PJ_{28}	12 August 1994	list
(27841) 1994 PS_{36}	10 August 1994	list
(27856) 1995 AX_{3}	2 January 1995	list
(27889) 1996 GR_{17}	15 April 1996	list
(27890) 1996 GG_{18}	15 April 1996	list
(27892) 1996 HG_{25}	20 April 1996	list
(27893) 1996 HK_{25}	20 April 1996	list
(27897) 1996 NF_{4}	14 July 1996	list
(27913) 1996 TC_{41}	8 October 1996	list
(27914) 1996 TN_{41}	8 October 1996	list
(27936) 1997 JF_{12}	3 May 1997	list
(27937) 1997 JJ_{13}	3 May 1997	list
27938 Guislain	3 May 1997	list
(27942) 1997 LL_{9}	7 June 1997	list
(27943) 1997 LB_{12}	7 June 1997	list
(28027) 1998 CC_{5}	6 February 1998	list
(28034) 1998 EU_{13}	1 March 1998	list
28059 Kiliaan	26 July 1998	list
(28060) 1998 OL_{8}	26 July 1998	list
(28061) 1998 ON_{11}	26 July 1998	list
(28063) 1998 OR_{14}	26 July 1998	list
(28086) 1998 QW_{100}	26 August 1998	list
(28087) 1998 QH_{101}	26 August 1998	list
(28119) 1998 SX_{71}	21 September 1998	list
(28120) 1998 SX_{72}	21 September 1998	list
(28121) 1998 SY_{72}	21 September 1998	list
(28122) 1998 SJ_{74}	21 September 1998	list
(28123) 1998 SM_{74}	21 September 1998	list
(28140) 1998 SR_{144}	20 September 1998	list
(28154) 1998 UQ_{26}	18 October 1998	list
29132 Bradpitt	22 January 1987	list
(29135) 1987 SZ_{2}	21 September 1987	list
(29140) 1988 CG_{4}	13 February 1988	list
(29141) 1988 CZ_{4}	13 February 1988	list
(29142) 1988 CR_{7}	15 February 1988	list
(29158) 1989 EE_{3}	2 March 1989	list
29160 São Paulo	26 September 1989	list
(29161) 1989 SF_{2}	26 September 1989	list
(29162) 1989 SD_{4}	26 September 1989	list
(29166) 1989 VP_{1}	3 November 1989	list
(29174) 1990 QJ_{6}	20 August 1990	list
(29175) 1990 QP_{6}	20 August 1990	list
(29176) 1990 QJ_{10}	16 August 1990	list
(29179) 1990 RT_{13}	14 September 1990	list
(29181) 1990 SE_{6}	22 September 1990	list
(29182) 1990 ST_{6}	22 September 1990	list
(29183) 1990 SQ_{7}	22 September 1990	list
29187 Lemonnier	16 October 1990	list
(29188) 1990 UW_{3}	16 October 1990	list
29189 Udinsk	16 October 1990	list
(29190) 1990 UZ_{4}	16 October 1990	list
(29191) 1990 UQ_{5}	16 October 1990	list
29193 Dolphyn	18 November 1990	list
(29194) 1990 WJ_{4}	16 November 1990	list
(29195) 1990 WF_{5}	16 November 1990	list
(29201) 1991 GO_{4}	8 April 1991	list
(29202) 1991 GH_{8}	8 April 1991	list
(29207) 1991 RG_{2}	6 September 1991	list
29210 Robertbrown	4 September 1991	list
(29216) 1991 VX_{5}	2 November 1991	list
29220 Xavierbaptista	30 January 1992	list
(29240) 1992 GE_{3}	4 April 1992	list
(29241) 1992 GA_{5}	4 April 1992	list
(29242) 1992 HB_{4}	23 April 1992	list
29244 Van Damme	26 July 1992	list
(29245) 1992 PZ	8 August 1992	list
(29247) 1992 RC_{4}	2 September 1992	list
(29291) 1993 JX	14 May 1993	list
(29293) 1993 OG_{9}	20 July 1993	list
(29294) 1993 OH_{9}	20 July 1993	list
(29295) 1993 OC_{13}	19 July 1993	list
(29296) 1993 PY_{5}	15 August 1993	list
(29297) 1993 RU_{7}	15 September 1993	list
29298 Cruls	16 September 1993	list^{[E]}
(29300) 1993 TD_{25}	9 October 1993	list
(29301) 1993 TQ_{31}	9 October 1993	list
(29302) 1993 TY_{34}	9 October 1993	list
(29304) 1993 TF_{37}	9 October 1993	list
(29305) 1993 TJ_{38}	9 October 1993	list
(29306) 1993 TK_{38}	9 October 1993	list
29307 Torbernbergman	9 October 1993	list
29311 Lesire	16 January 1994	list^{[D]}
29314 Eurydamas	8 February 1994	list
(29315) 1994 EV_{5}	9 March 1994	list
(29317) 1994 PR_{9}	10 August 1994	list
(29318) 1994 PH_{14}	10 August 1994	list
(29319) 1994 PS_{14}	10 August 1994	list
(29320) 1994 PW_{14}	10 August 1994	list
(29321) 1994 PL_{16}	10 August 1994	list
(29322) 1994 PS_{16}	10 August 1994	list
(29323) 1994 PN_{19}	12 August 1994	list
(29324) 1994 PM_{31}	12 August 1994	list
(29325) 1994 PN_{39}	10 August 1994	list
(29366) 1996 DS_{6}	16 February 1996	list
(29371) 1996 FG_{16}	22 March 1996	list
(29375) 1996 GN_{17}	15 April 1996	list
(29376) 1996 GU_{17}	15 April 1996	list
(29377) 1996 GV_{18}	15 April 1996	list
(29379) 1996 HX_{12}	17 April 1996	list
(29380) 1996 HO_{13}	17 April 1996	list
(29381) 1996 HR_{15}	18 April 1996	list
(29382) 1996 HM_{16}	18 April 1996	list
(29383) 1996 HA_{23}	20 April 1996	list
(29384) 1996 HO_{23}	20 April 1996	list
(29393) 1996 NA_{3}	14 July 1996	list
(29436) 1997 JT_{14}	3 May 1997	list
(29553) 1998 CZ_{3}	6 February 1998	list
(29554) 1998 CL_{4}	6 February 1998	list
(29602) 1998 LA_{2}	1 June 1998	list
(29616) 1998 SG_{64}	20 September 1998	list
(29622) 1998 SM_{145}	20 September 1998	list
30773 Schelde	6 September 1986	list
(30774) 1987 BU_{1}	25 January 1987	list
(30777) 1987 SB_{3}	21 September 1987	list
(30780) 1988 CA_{2}	11 February 1988	list
(30781) 1988 CR_{2}	11 February 1988	list
(30782) 1988 CC_{4}	13 February 1988	list
(30783) 1988 CO_{4}	13 February 1988	list
(30796) 1989 CU_{2}	4 February 1989	list
30797 Chimborazo	4 February 1989	list
(30801) 1989 SS_{1}	26 September 1989	list
(30802) 1989 SH_{3}	26 September 1989	list
(30817) 1990 QN_{9}	16 August 1990	list
(30822) 1990 SX_{5}	22 September 1990	list
30832 Urbaincreve	16 October 1990	list
(30833) 1990 VM_{4}	15 November 1990	list
(30834) 1990 VR_{6}	15 November 1990	list
30835 Waterloo	21 November 1990	list
(30841) 1991 GA_{3}	8 April 1991	list
(30842) 1991 GO_{7}	8 April 1991	list
(30845) 1991 PQ_{3}	2 August 1991	list
30857 Parsec	31 December 1991	list
30881 Robertstevenson	2 September 1992	list
(30918) 1993 KV_{2}	27 May 1993	list
(30919) 1993 NV_{1}	12 July 1993	list
(30920) 1993 OV_{4}	20 July 1993	list
(30921) 1993 OG_{6}	20 July 1993	list
(30922) 1993 OE_{13}	19 July 1993	list
(30923) 1993 QU_{4}	18 August 1993	list
(30927) 1993 TF_{17}	9 October 1993	list
30928 Jefferson	9 October 1993	list
(30929) 1993 TR_{38}	9 October 1993	list
(30931) 1993 UJ_{5}	20 October 1993	list
(30932) 1993 UO_{5}	20 October 1993	list
30936 Basra	16 January 1994	list^{[D]}
30937 Bashkirtseff	16 January 1994	list^{[D]}
30938 Montmartre	16 January 1994	list^{[D]}
30939 Samaritaine	16 January 1994	list^{[D]}
(30941) 1994 CJ_{11}	7 February 1994	list
30942 Helicaon	8 February 1994	list
(30949) 1994 PF_{9}	10 August 1994	list
(30950) 1994 PJ_{9}	10 August 1994	list
(30951) 1994 PL_{13}	10 August 1994	list
(30952) 1994 PX_{15}	10 August 1994	list
(30953) 1994 PZ_{17}	10 August 1994	list
(30954) 1994 PM_{28}	12 August 1994	list
30955 Weiser	12 August 1994	list
(30977) 1995 JJ_{1}	5 May 1995	list
(31029) 1996 HC_{16}	18 April 1996	list
(31030) 1996 HN_{19}	18 April 1996	list
31031 Altiplano	18 April 1996	list
31032 Scheidemann	20 April 1996	list
(31033) 1996 HY_{23}	20 April 1996	list
(31034) 1996 HC_{24}	20 April 1996	list
(31035) 1996 HJ_{24}	20 April 1996	list
(31036) 1996 HM_{25}	20 April 1996	list
31037 Mydon	20 April 1996	list
(31038) 1996 HG_{26}	20 April 1996	list
(31042) 1996 KS_{4}	22 May 1996	list
(31045) 1996 NP_{4}	14 July 1996	list
(31046) 1996 NU_{4}	14 July 1996	list
(31047) 1996 PW_{8}	8 August 1996	list
(31067) 1996 TF_{50}	4 October 1996	list
31097 Nucciomula	3 May 1997	list
(31235) 1998 CE_{3}	6 February 1998	list
(31237) 1998 CY_{4}	6 February 1998	list
(31257) 1998 DG_{35}	27 February 1998	list
(31264) 1998 EQ_{11}	1 March 1998	list
(31265) 1998 EC_{13}	1 March 1998	list
31266 Tournefort	1 March 1998	list
31267 Kuldiga	1 March 1998	list
(31334) 1998 HW_{102}	25 April 1998	list
31338 Lipperhey	25 April 1998	list
(32778) 1988 CW_{1}	11 February 1988	list
(32779) 1988 CZ_{2}	11 February 1988	list
(32780) 1988 CR_{5}	13 February 1988	list
(32781) 1988 DD_{2}	17 February 1988	list
(32786) 1989 GW_{2}	3 April 1989	list
(32787) 1989 ST_{1}	26 September 1989	list
(32788) 1989 SJ_{3}	26 September 1989	list
(32789) 1989 SF_{5}	26 September 1989	list
(32792) 1989 TR_{7}	7 October 1989	list
32796 Ehrenfest	2 March 1990	list
(32812) 1990 UY_{4}	16 October 1990	list
(32813) 1990 WH_{4}	16 November 1990	list
(32816) 1991 PP_{1}	2 August 1991	list
(32817) 1991 PZ_{5}	6 August 1991	list
(32818) 1991 PL_{10}	14 August 1991	list
(32824) 1992 CJ_{3}	2 February 1992	list
(32825) 1992 CK_{3}	2 February 1992	list
(32849) 1992 OO_{2}	26 July 1992	list
(32850) 1992 RY_{4}	2 September 1992	list
(32851) 1992 RC_{6}	2 September 1992	list
(32852) 1992 RE_{7}	2 September 1992	list
(32878) 1993 NX	12 July 1993	list
(32879) 1993 OO_{5}	20 July 1993	list
(32880) 1993 OR_{5}	20 July 1993	list
(32881) 1993 OK_{6}	20 July 1993	list
(32882) 1993 RW_{6}	15 September 1993	list
(32883) 1993 RJ_{7}	15 September 1993	list
(32884) 1993 SO_{14}	16 September 1993	list^{[E]}
(32885) 1993 TC_{25}	9 October 1993	list
(32886) 1993 TS_{26}	9 October 1993	list
(32887) 1993 TT_{26}	9 October 1993	list
(32888) 1993 TD_{27}	9 October 1993	list
(32889) 1993 TN_{29}	9 October 1993	list
32893 van der Waals	9 March 1994	list
(32900) 1994 PG_{5}	10 August 1994	list
(32901) 1994 PB_{9}	10 August 1994	list
(32902) 1994 PC_{10}	10 August 1994	list
(32903) 1994 PN_{17}	10 August 1994	list
(32904) 1994 PU_{24}	12 August 1994	list
(32905) 1994 PX_{32}	12 August 1994	list
(32952) 1996 FA_{16}	22 March 1996	list
(32953) 1996 GF_{19}	15 April 1996	list
(32954) 1996 GP_{20}	15 April 1996	list
(32956) 1996 HR_{18}	18 April 1996	list
(32957) 1996 HX_{20}	18 April 1996	list
(32958) 1996 HU_{24}	20 April 1996	list
(32959) 1996 HB_{25}	20 April 1996	list
(32960) 1996 NO_{4}	14 July 1996	list
(32967) 1996 PG_{7}	8 August 1996	list
(32968) 1996 PK_{8}	8 August 1996	list
33012 Eddieirizarry	9 March 1997	list
33017 Wronski	9 April 1997	list
(33131) 1998 CW_{3}	6 February 1998	list
(33133) 1998 CF_{4}	6 February 1998	list
(33134) 1998 CZ_{4}	6 February 1998	list
(33159) 1998 DQ_{33}	27 February 1998	list
33160 Denismukwege	27 February 1998	list
(33161) 1998 DE_{35}	27 February 1998	list
(33169) 1998 EU_{10}	1 March 1998	list
(33170) 1998 EE_{11}	1 March 1998	list
(33171) 1998 EF_{14}	1 March 1998	list
(33172) 1998 EK_{14}	1 March 1998	list
(33272) 1998 HC_{102}	25 April 1998	list
(33283) 1998 HJ_{148}	25 April 1998	list
33319 Kunqu	28 June 1998	list
(33320) 1998 OP_{12}	26 July 1998	list
(33333) 1998 SP_{66}	20 September 1998	list
34892 Evapalisa	15 November 2001	list^{[E]}
(35068) 1989 SF_{4}	26 September 1989	list
(35069) 1989 SH_{4}	26 September 1989	list
(35070) 1989 TE_{3}	7 October 1989	list
(35071) 1989 TE_{5}	7 October 1989	list
(35072) 1989 TX_{6}	7 October 1989	list
(35075) 1989 XW_{1}	2 December 1989	list
(35078) 1990 QB_{7}	20 August 1990	list
(35079) 1990 QR_{7}	16 August 1990	list
(35080) 1990 QH_{8}	16 August 1990	list
(35081) 1990 QT_{8}	16 August 1990	list
(35083) 1990 SP_{6}	22 September 1990	list
(35084) 1990 SP_{9}	22 September 1990	list
35087 von Sydow	16 October 1990	list
(35088) 1990 VU_{4}	15 November 1990	list
(35089) 1990 WH_{1}	18 November 1990	list
(35090) 1990 WR_{1}	18 November 1990	list
(35091) 1990 WC_{2}	18 November 1990	list
(35092) 1990 WK_{6}	21 November 1990	list
(35094) 1991 GW_{2}	8 April 1991	list
(35095) 1991 GY_{3}	8 April 1991	list
(35096) 1991 GV_{4}	8 April 1991	list
(35097) 1991 GS_{5}	8 April 1991	list
(35098) 1991 GB_{7}	8 April 1991	list
(35099) 1991 GY_{7}	8 April 1991	list
(35110) 1992 BJ_{2}	30 January 1992	list
(35112) 1992 BT_{5}	30 January 1992	list
(35113) 1992 CR_{2}	2 February 1992	list
(35136) 1992 RU_{1}	2 September 1992	list
35137 Meudon	2 September 1992	list
(35138) 1992 RV_{5}	2 September 1992	list

Name	Discovery Date	Listing
(35139) 1992 RP_{7}	2 September 1992	list
(35140) 1992 RQ_{7}	2 September 1992	list
(35144) 1992 YE_{1}	18 December 1992	list
(35160) 1993 NY	12 July 1993	list
(35162) 1993 OE_{2}	20 July 1993	list
(35163) 1993 OD_{5}	20 July 1993	list
(35164) 1993 PZ_{8}	14 August 1993	list
35165 Québec	16 August 1993	list
(35166) 1993 QD_{8}	20 August 1993	list
(35167) 1993 RX_{13}	14 September 1993	list^{[E]}
(35168) 1993 RS_{14}	15 September 1993	list
(35174) 1993 TV_{13}	9 October 1993	list
(35177) 1993 TP_{22}	9 October 1993	list
(35178) 1993 TQ_{27}	9 October 1993	list
(35179) 1993 TK_{28}	9 October 1993	list
(35180) 1993 TC_{38}	9 October 1993	list
(35181) 1993 TO_{38}	9 October 1993	list
(35184) 1993 UW_{3}	20 October 1993	list
(35193) 1994 CG_{14}	8 February 1994	list
(35199) 1994 PE_{3}	10 August 1994	list
(35200) 1994 PX_{4}	10 August 1994	list
(35201) 1994 PW_{6}	10 August 1994	list
(35202) 1994 PH_{8}	10 August 1994	list
(35203) 1994 PF_{15}	10 August 1994	list
(35204) 1994 PV_{15}	10 August 1994	list
(35205) 1994 PS_{17}	10 August 1994	list
(35206) 1994 PO_{27}	12 August 1994	list
(35207) 1994 PN_{36}	10 August 1994	list
(35208) 1994 PB_{38}	10 August 1994	list
(35209) 1994 PJ_{38}	10 August 1994	list
(35210) 1994 PR_{39}	10 August 1994	list
(35212) 1994 RP_{18}	3 September 1994	list
(35257) 1996 HM_{14}	17 April 1996	list
(35258) 1996 HN_{23}	20 April 1996	list
(35259) 1996 HN_{24}	20 April 1996	list
(35260) 1996 HA_{25}	20 April 1996	list
(35263) 1996 NH_{3}	14 July 1996	list
(35264) 1996 NM_{5}	14 July 1996	list
(35267) 1996 PO_{7}	8 August 1996	list
(35289) 1996 TL_{40}	8 October 1996	list
(35290) 1996 TE_{42}	8 October 1996	list
(35293) 1996 TC_{54}	5 October 1996	list
(35331) 1997 EO_{47}	12 March 1997	list
(35332) 1997 EY_{52}	8 March 1997	list
(35333) 1997 EW_{55}	10 March 1997	list
35347 Tallinn	3 May 1997	list
(35349) 1997 LY_{12}	7 June 1997	list
35350 Lespaul	8 June 1997	list
(35447) 1998 CW_{2}	6 February 1998	list
(35448) 1998 CX_{2}	6 February 1998	list
(35449) 1998 CR_{3}	6 February 1998	list
(35450) 1998 CV_{4}	6 February 1998	list
(35451) 1998 CW_{4}	6 February 1998	list
(35466) 1998 DO_{34}	27 February 1998	list
(35476) 1998 EN_{10}	1 March 1998	list
(35477) 1998 ER_{10}	1 March 1998	list
(35478) 1998 EG_{11}	1 March 1998	list
(35614) 1998 HB_{148}	25 April 1998	list
(35615) 1998 HE_{148}	25 April 1998	list
(35616) 1998 HN_{148}	25 April 1998	list
(35617) 1998 HY_{148}	25 April 1998	list
35618 Tartu	25 April 1998	list
(35619) 1998 HT_{149}	25 April 1998	list
(35656) 1998 OZ_{12}	26 July 1998	list
37561 Churgym	13 February 1988	list
(37566) 1989 GY_{1}	3 April 1989	list
(37567) 1989 SC_{3}	26 September 1989	list
(37575) 1990 QD_{7}	20 August 1990	list
(37579) 1990 SO_{7}	22 September 1990	list
(37580) 1990 SH_{8}	22 September 1990	list
(37585) 1990 VQ_{8}	15 November 1990	list
37596 Cotahuasi	9 November 1991	list
(37604) 1992 OQ_{1}	26 July 1992	list
(37606) 1992 RX_{4}	2 September 1992	list
37607 Regineolsen	2 September 1992	list
(37617) 1993 NN_{1}	12 July 1993	list
(37618) 1993 OD_{3}	20 July 1993	list
(37619) 1993 OJ_{6}	20 July 1993	list
(37620) 1993 QA_{3}	16 August 1993	list
(37621) 1993 QT_{4}	18 August 1993	list
(37622) 1993 QO_{8}	20 August 1993	list
37623 Valmiera	15 September 1993	list
(37624) 1993 RT_{8}	14 September 1993	list^{[E]}
(37628) 1993 TK_{17}	9 October 1993	list
(37629) 1993 TX_{19}	9 October 1993	list
37630 Thomasmore	9 October 1993	list
(37631) 1993 TT_{27}	9 October 1993	list
(37632) 1993 TT_{37}	9 October 1993	list
(37633) 1993 TG_{39}	9 October 1993	list
(37636) 1993 UQ_{4}	20 October 1993	list
(37637) 1993 UZ_{5}	20 October 1993	list
(37644) 1994 BN_{3}	16 January 1994	list^{[D]}
37645 Chebarkul	8 February 1994	list
37646 Falconscott	8 February 1994	list
(37648) 1994 EV_{6}	9 March 1994	list
(37656) 1994 PP_{6}	10 August 1994	list
(37657) 1994 PX_{14}	10 August 1994	list
(37658) 1994 PK_{18}	12 August 1994	list
(37659) 1994 PM_{20}	12 August 1994	list
(37660) 1994 PG_{22}	12 August 1994	list
(37661) 1994 PJ_{26}	12 August 1994	list
(37662) 1994 PT_{26}	12 August 1994	list
(37663) 1994 PT_{32}	12 August 1994	list
(37664) 1994 PF_{39}	10 August 1994	list
(37665) 1994 RH_{17}	3 September 1994	list
(37705) 1996 GD_{20}	15 April 1996	list
(37727) 1996 TE_{39}	8 October 1996	list
(37728) 1996 TG_{39}	8 October 1996	list
(37761) 1997 EN_{51}	5 March 1997	list
37782 Jacquespiccard	3 May 1997	list
(37831) 1998 BH_{36}	27 January 1998	list
37853 Danielbarbier	27 February 1998	list
(37854) 1998 EY_{11}	1 March 1998	list
(37855) 1998 EE_{12}	1 March 1998	list
(37856) 1998 EV_{12}	1 March 1998	list
(37971) 1998 HS_{102}	25 April 1998	list
38018 Louisneefs	1 June 1998	list
38019 Jeanmariepelt	1 June 1998	list
(38023) 1998 MO_{39}	26 June 1998	list
38046 Krasnoyarsk	20 September 1998	list
39516 Lusigny	27 July 1987	list
(39517) 1988 CV_{2}	11 February 1988	list
(39518) 1988 CS_{4}	13 February 1988	list
(39519) 1988 CQ_{5}	13 February 1988	list
(39523) 1989 ST_{2}	26 September 1989	list
(39524) 1989 SM_{3}	26 September 1989	list
(39526) 1989 TW_{3}	7 October 1989	list
(39527) 1989 TO_{5}	7 October 1989	list
39529 Vatnajökull	3 November 1989	list
(39530) 1990 EX_{1}	2 March 1990	list
(39531) 1990 ER_{2}	2 March 1990	list
39539 Emmadesmet	8 April 1991	list
(39542) 1991 PO_{3}	2 August 1991	list
39543 Aubriet	6 August 1991	list
(39556) 1992 GF_{2}	4 April 1992	list
39564 Tarsia	2 September 1992	list
(39592) 1993 OD_{6}	20 July 1993	list
(39593) 1993 OM_{10}	20 July 1993	list
(39594) 1993 PP_{7}	15 August 1993	list
(39595) 1993 QP_{6}	20 August 1993	list
(39596) 1993 QZ_{8}	20 August 1993	list
(39597) 1993 RP_{6}	15 September 1993	list
(39598) 1993 RG_{13}	14 September 1993	list^{[E]}
(39599) 1993 SC_{6}	17 September 1993	list
(39600) 1993 TX_{15}	9 October 1993	list
(39601) 1993 TG_{18}	9 October 1993	list
(39602) 1993 TH_{20}	9 October 1993	list
(39603) 1993 TU_{20}	9 October 1993	list
(39604) 1993 TM_{23}	9 October 1993	list
(39605) 1993 TX_{23}	9 October 1993	list
(39606) 1993 TL_{24}	9 October 1993	list
(39607) 1993 TF_{30}	9 October 1993	list
(39608) 1993 TQ_{32}	9 October 1993	list
(39609) 1993 TN_{34}	9 October 1993	list
(39610) 1993 TD_{38}	9 October 1993	list
(39611) 1993 UO_{8}	20 October 1993	list
(39617) 1994 CZ_{11}	7 February 1994	list
(39621) 1994 PU_{4}	10 August 1994	list
(39622) 1994 PJ_{5}	10 August 1994	list
(39623) 1994 PJ_{7}	10 August 1994	list
(39624) 1994 PT_{8}	10 August 1994	list
(39625) 1994 PV_{9}	10 August 1994	list
(39626) 1994 PV_{18}	12 August 1994	list
(39627) 1994 PX_{21}	12 August 1994	list
(39628) 1994 PJ_{24}	12 August 1994	list
(39629) 1994 PG_{26}	12 August 1994	list
(39630) 1994 PQ_{39}	10 August 1994	list
(39660) 1995 UU_{46}	20 October 1995	list
(39684) 1996 PD_{8}	8 August 1996	list
(39685) 1996 PO_{8}	8 August 1996	list
(39710) 1996 TU_{48}	4 October 1996	list
(39711) 1996 TW_{53}	5 October 1996	list
(39713) 1996 TE_{57}	2 October 1996	list
(39760) 1997 EM_{54}	8 March 1997	list
(39782) 1997 JR_{15}	3 May 1997	list
(39785) 1997 LV_{10}	7 June 1997	list
(39786) 1997 LV_{17}	8 June 1997	list
(39850) 1998 CG_{3}	6 February 1998	list
(39851) 1998 CU_{3}	6 February 1998	list
(39852) 1998 CV_{3}	6 February 1998	list
(39853) 1998 CA_{4}	6 February 1998	list
(39872) 1998 DW_{33}	27 February 1998	list
(39873) 1998 DC_{34}	27 February 1998	list
(39874) 1998 DC_{35}	27 February 1998	list
(39881) 1998 EK_{11}	1 March 1998	list
39882 Edgarmitchell	1 March 1998	list
(39883) 1998 ER_{11}	1 March 1998	list
(39884) 1998 ET_{11}	1 March 1998	list
(39885) 1998 EG_{12}	1 March 1998	list
(39886) 1998 EL_{12}	1 March 1998	list
(39887) 1998 ED_{13}	1 March 1998	list
(39888) 1998 ES_{20}	3 March 1998	list
40007 Vieuxtemps	25 April 1998	list
40023 ANPCEN	25 April 1998	list
(40024) 1998 HW_{148}	25 April 1998	list
(40025) 1998 HQ_{149}	25 April 1998	list
(40089) 1998 MH_{40}	26 June 1998	list
(40090) 1998 MZ_{40}	28 June 1998	list
(40091) 1998 MH_{41}	28 June 1998	list
40092 Memel	28 June 1998	list
(40096) 1998 OR_{9}	26 July 1998	list
(40097) 1998 OB_{13}	26 July 1998	list
(40098) 1998 OW_{14}	26 July 1998	list
(40099) 1998 OB_{15}	26 July 1998	list
(40164) 1998 QW_{99}	26 August 1998	list
(40165) 1998 QP_{102}	26 August 1998	list
(40166) 1998 QW_{102}	26 August 1998	list
(40167) 1998 QF_{103}	26 August 1998	list
(40168) 1998 QW_{104}	26 August 1998	list
(40169) 1998 QG_{105}	25 August 1998	list
(40225) 1998 SX_{144}	20 September 1998	list
(40226) 1998 SA_{145}	20 September 1998	list
40227 Tahiti	20 September 1998	list
(40443) 1999 RU_{35}	7 September 1999	list
41107 Ropakov	1 November 1999	list^{[G]}
(42481) 1988 CX_{4}	13 February 1988	list
(42484) 1990 WM_{6}	21 November 1990	list
42485 Stendhal	18 January 1991	list
(42486) 1991 GY_{2}	8 April 1991	list
(42497) 1992 BZ_{1}	30 January 1992	list
(42500) 1992 RV_{6}	2 September 1992	list
(42514) 1993 TG_{17}	9 October 1993	list
(42515) 1993 TJ_{33}	9 October 1993	list
(42521) 1994 BO_{3}	16 January 1994	list^{[D]}
42522 Chuckberry	8 February 1994	list
(42524) 1994 PN_{5}	10 August 1994	list
(42525) 1994 PU_{18}	12 August 1994	list
(42526) 1994 PA_{36}	10 August 1994	list
(42547) 1996 GY_{19}	15 April 1996	list
(42548) 1996 HU_{12}	17 April 1996	list
(42549) 1996 HJ_{17}	18 April 1996	list
(42550) 1996 HU_{23}	20 April 1996	list
(42584) 1997 ET_{46}	12 March 1997	list
(42591) 1997 GE_{42}	9 April 1997	list
42609 Daubechies	27 February 1998	list
(42610) 1998 DD_{35}	27 February 1998	list
(42615) 1998 EV_{11}	1 March 1998	list
(42616) 1998 EX_{20}	3 March 1998	list
(42683) 1998 HS_{148}	25 April 1998	list
42697 Lucapaolini	1 June 1998	list
(42705) 1998 OW_{8}	26 July 1998	list
(42730) 1998 QE_{106}	25 August 1998	list
(42731) 1998 QJ_{106}	25 August 1998	list
(42758) 1998 SD_{72}	21 September 1998	list
(42759) 1998 SR_{73}	21 September 1998	list
(42766) 1998 SN_{143}	18 September 1998	list
42776 Casablanca	18 October 1998	list
(42777) 1998 UY_{30}	18 October 1998	list
43025 Valusha	1 November 1999	list^{[G]}
(43765) 1988 CF_{4}	13 February 1988	list
(43766) 1988 CR_{4}	13 February 1988	list
43767 Permeke	13 February 1988	list
43768 Lynevans	15 February 1988	list
(43774) 1989 CO_{2}	4 February 1989	list
(43776) 1989 GP_{2}	3 April 1989	list
(43777) 1989 RK_{1}	3 September 1989	list
(43778) 1989 SY_{3}	26 September 1989	list
(43779) 1989 SQ_{5}	26 September 1989	list
(43781) 1989 TB_{3}	7 October 1989	list
(43784) 1989 XR_{1}	2 December 1989	list
(43785) 1989 YC_{6}	29 December 1989	list
(43786) 1990 QA_{8}	16 August 1990	list
(43787) 1990 QR_{8}	16 August 1990	list
(43789) 1990 SN_{9}	22 September 1990	list
(43791) 1990 UK_{5}	16 October 1990	list
(43798) 1991 GW_{8}	8 April 1991	list
(43816) 1992 CN_{2}	2 February 1992	list
(43820) 1992 PP_{1}	8 August 1992	list
(43821) 1992 RL_{3}	2 September 1992	list
(43822) 1992 RP_{5}	2 September 1992	list
(43827) 1993 BV_{5}	27 January 1993	list
43843 Cleynaerts	12 July 1993	list
(43845) 1993 OS_{9}	20 July 1993	list
(43846) 1993 PV_{8}	15 August 1993	list^{[D]}
(43847) 1993 QQ_{5}	17 August 1993	list
(43848) 1993 QP_{9}	20 August 1993	list
(43849) 1993 RB_{11}	14 September 1993	list^{[E]}
(43850) 1993 SB_{14}	16 September 1993	list^{[E]}
(43852) 1993 TH_{28}	9 October 1993	list
(43853) 1993 TM_{29}	9 October 1993	list
(43854) 1993 TO_{31}	9 October 1993	list
(43855) 1993 TX_{36}	9 October 1993	list
(43856) 1993 UV_{4}	20 October 1993	list
(43860) 1994 CQ_{9}	7 February 1994	list
(43861) 1994 CT_{13}	8 February 1994	list
(43863) 1994 EU_{6}	9 March 1994	list
(43865) 1994 PX_{9}	10 August 1994	list
(43866) 1994 PG_{19}	12 August 1994	list
(43867) 1994 PO_{28}	12 August 1994	list
(43868) 1994 PL_{35}	10 August 1994	list
(43928) 1996 HE_{13}	17 April 1996	list
(43938) 1996 TH_{51}	5 October 1996	list
(43939) 1996 TT_{53}	5 October 1996	list
(44032) 1998 CD_{3}	6 February 1998	list
44039 de Sahagún	27 February 1998	list
(44040) 1998 DA_{35}	27 February 1998	list
(44043) 1998 EW_{12}	1 March 1998	list
(44044) 1998 EE_{13}	1 March 1998	list
(44045) 1998 EA_{14}	1 March 1998	list
(44146) 1998 HZ_{101}	25 April 1998	list
(44147) 1998 HB_{103}	25 April 1998	list
(44162) 1998 HC_{148}	25 April 1998	list
(44163) 1998 HH_{148}	25 April 1998	list
(44191) 1998 LF_{2}	1 June 1998	list
(44210) 1998 OX_{10}	26 July 1998	list
(44213) 1998 OZ_{13}	26 July 1998	list
(44214) 1998 OC_{14}	26 July 1998	list
(44215) 1998 OX_{14}	26 July 1998	list
(44302) 1998 QQ_{99}	26 August 1998	list
(44303) 1998 QA_{101}	26 August 1998	list
(44304) 1998 QD_{102}	26 August 1998	list
(44305) 1998 QK_{102}	26 August 1998	list
(44306) 1998 QC_{104}	26 August 1998	list
(44307) 1998 QH_{105}	25 August 1998	list
(44391) 1998 SH_{64}	20 September 1998	list
(44392) 1998 SY_{65}	20 September 1998	list
(44393) 1998 SJ_{66}	20 September 1998	list
(44394) 1998 ST_{66}	20 September 1998	list
(44397) 1998 SG_{71}	21 September 1998	list
(44398) 1998 SD_{75}	21 September 1998	list
(44416) 1998 ST_{143}	18 September 1998	list
(44417) 1998 SS_{146}	20 September 1998	list
(44418) 1998 SY_{146}	20 September 1998	list
(44450) 1998 UB_{25}	18 October 1998	list
(44451) 1998 UT_{30}	18 October 1998	list
(46547) 1989 GE_{3}	3 April 1989	list
(46548) 1989 SK_{1}	26 September 1989	list
(46549) 1989 SA_{2}	26 September 1989	list
(46551) 1989 TC_{4}	7 October 1989	list
(46553) 1990 RW_{14}	14 September 1990	list
(46554) 1990 SZ_{8}	22 September 1990	list
(46558) 1991 GY_{5}	8 April 1991	list
(46560) 1991 PZ_{1}	2 August 1991	list
(46581) 1992 OK_{2}	26 July 1992	list
(46582) 1992 RR_{3}	2 September 1992	list
(46583) 1992 RW_{3}	2 September 1992	list
(46584) 1992 RN_{6}	2 September 1992	list
(46585) 1992 RD_{7}	2 September 1992	list
(46593) 1992 YP_{1}	18 December 1992	list
(46607) 1993 OY_{12}	19 July 1993	list
(46612) 1993 TS_{16}	9 October 1993	list
(46613) 1993 TA_{17}	9 October 1993	list
(46614) 1993 TV_{27}	9 October 1993	list
(46615) 1993 TT_{32}	9 October 1993	list
(46618) 1994 CF_{16}	8 February 1994	list
(46619) 1994 CR_{16}	8 February 1994	list
(46621) 1994 EC_{7}	9 March 1994	list
(46622) 1994 EF_{7}	9 March 1994	list
(46626) 1994 PL_{23}	12 August 1994	list
(46627) 1994 PG_{24}	12 August 1994	list
(46628) 1994 PD_{27}	12 August 1994	list
(46629) 1994 PS_{38}	10 August 1994	list
(46637) 1994 WJ_{12}	27 November 1994	list
(46666) 1996 FX_{21}	24 March 1996	list
(46668) 1996 HM_{10}	17 April 1996	list
(46671) 1996 NW_{3}	14 July 1996	list
(46674) 1996 PY_{8}	8 August 1996	list
(46750) 1998 EL_{14}	1 March 1998	list
(46790) 1998 HG_{149}	25 April 1998	list
(46791) 1998 HW_{149}	25 April 1998	list
46824 Tambora	26 June 1998	list
(46828) 1998 OU_{10}	26 July 1998	list
46829 McMahon	26 July 1998	list
(46870) 1998 QC_{100}	26 August 1998	list
(46871) 1998 QF_{100}	26 August 1998	list
(46872) 1998 QP_{101}	26 August 1998	list
(46873) 1998 QZ_{101}	26 August 1998	list
(46874) 1998 QC_{103}	26 August 1998	list
(46875) 1998 QD_{104}	26 August 1998	list
(46876) 1998 QV_{104}	26 August 1998	list
(46935) 1998 SL_{65}	20 September 1998	list
(46936) 1998 SN_{67}	20 September 1998	list
(46937) 1998 SA_{71}	21 September 1998	list
(46938) 1998 SP_{71}	21 September 1998	list
(46939) 1998 SM_{73}	21 September 1998	list
(46940) 1998 SK_{74}	21 September 1998	list
(46941) 1998 SQ_{74}	21 September 1998	list
(46942) 1998 SL_{75}	21 September 1998	list
46977 Krakow	18 September 1998	list
(46978) 1998 SD_{145}	20 September 1998	list
(46986) 1998 SR_{163}	18 September 1998	list
(47012) 1998 UZ_{26}	18 October 1998	list
(47013) 1998 UZ_{27}	18 October 1998	list
(48417) 1988 CQ_{2}	11 February 1988	list
(48426) 1989 EV_{2}	2 March 1989	list
(48427) 1989 SZ_{2}	26 September 1989	list
(48428) 1989 SV_{5}	26 September 1989	list
(48430) 1989 TQ_{3}	7 October 1989	list
(48432) 1989 TM_{6}	7 October 1989	list
(48437) 1989 VM_{1}	3 November 1989	list
(48441) 1990 ET_{1}	2 March 1990	list
(48442) 1990 GF	15 April 1990	list
(48444) 1990 QQ_{7}	16 August 1990	list
(48445) 1990 QX_{7}	16 August 1990	list
48451 Pichincha	2 August 1991	list
(48452) 1991 PH_{7}	6 August 1991	list
(48483) 1992 CB_{3}	2 February 1992	list
(48490) 1992 GD_{4}	4 April 1992	list
(48497) 1993 BQ_{5}	27 January 1993	list
(48499) 1993 BV_{7}	23 January 1993	list
(48500) 1993 DU_{2}	20 February 1993	list
(48528) 1993 OC_{3}	20 July 1993	list
48529 von Wrangel	20 July 1993	list
(48532) 1993 PL_{7}	15 August 1993	list
(48534) 1993 QM_{4}	18 August 1993	list
(48535) 1993 RD_{4}	15 September 1993	list
(48536) 1993 RS_{6}	15 September 1993	list
(48537) 1993 RO_{7}	15 September 1993	list
(48538) 1993 RF_{15}	15 September 1993	list^{[E]}
(48539) 1993 SD_{11}	22 September 1993	list^{[E]}
(48543) 1993 TJ_{14}	9 October 1993	list
(48544) 1993 TO_{15}	9 October 1993	list
(48545) 1993 TZ_{16}	9 October 1993	list
(48546) 1993 TM_{19}	9 October 1993	list
(48547) 1993 TJ_{20}	9 October 1993	list
(48548) 1993 TM_{25}	9 October 1993	list
(48549) 1993 TP_{25}	9 October 1993	list
(48550) 1993 TU_{25}	9 October 1993	list
(48551) 1993 TR_{28}	9 October 1993	list
(48552) 1993 TN_{31}	9 October 1993	list
(48553) 1993 TS_{31}	9 October 1993	list
(48554) 1993 TL_{32}	9 October 1993	list
(48555) 1993 TW_{32}	9 October 1993	list
(48556) 1993 TK_{33}	9 October 1993	list
(48557) 1993 TJ_{37}	9 October 1993	list
(48558) 1993 TL_{38}	9 October 1993	list
(48559) 1993 TJ_{39}	9 October 1993	list
(48562) 1993 UZ_{6}	20 October 1993	list
(48564) 1994 BL_{3}	16 January 1994	list^{[D]}
(48566) 1994 CH_{9}	7 February 1994	list
(48567) 1994 CH_{14}	8 February 1994	list
(48568) 1994 CO_{14}	8 February 1994	list
(48571) 1994 ER_{5}	9 March 1994	list
(48572) 1994 EJ_{6}	9 March 1994	list
(48577) 1994 PD_{8}	10 August 1994	list
(48578) 1994 PL_{11}	10 August 1994	list
(48579) 1994 PW_{11}	10 August 1994	list
(48580) 1994 PD_{17}	10 August 1994	list
(48581) 1994 PV_{19}	12 August 1994	list
(48582) 1994 PF_{25}	12 August 1994	list
(48583) 1994 PE_{35}	10 August 1994	list
(48584) 1994 PF_{37}	10 August 1994	list
(48585) 1994 PK_{37}	10 August 1994	list
(48586) 1994 PE_{39}	10 August 1994	list
(48587) 1994 PO_{39}	10 August 1994	list
(48589) 1994 RW_{17}	3 September 1994	list
(48692) 1996 GE_{20}	15 April 1996	list
(48693) 1996 GH_{20}	15 April 1996	list
(48696) 1996 HJ_{8}	17 April 1996	list
(48697) 1996 HX_{14}	17 April 1996	list
(48698) 1996 HJ_{20}	18 April 1996	list
(48699) 1996 HN_{21}	18 April 1996	list
(48711) 1996 ND_{5}	14 July 1996	list
(48714) 1996 PB_{8}	8 August 1996	list
(48742) 1997 EE_{47}	12 March 1997	list
(48743) 1997 EE_{57}	10 March 1997	list
(48765) 1997 JN_{13}	3 May 1997	list
(48766) 1997 JY_{13}	3 May 1997	list
48767 Skamander	3 May 1997	list
(48875) 1998 HF_{102}	25 April 1998	list
(48876) 1998 HE_{103}	25 April 1998	list
(48883) 1998 HY_{147}	25 April 1998	list
(48884) 1998 HJ_{149}	25 April 1998	list
(48897) 1998 LQ_{2}	1 June 1998	list
(48908) 1998 MG_{40}	26 June 1998	list
48909 Laurake	26 June 1998	list
(48910) 1998 MF_{48}	28 June 1998	list
(48918) 1998 OP_{8}	26 July 1998	list
(48919) 1998 OU_{8}	26 July 1998	list
(48920) 1998 OE_{11}	26 July 1998	list
(48921) 1998 OK_{11}	26 July 1998	list
(48922) 1998 OQ_{11}	26 July 1998	list
(48925) 1998 ON_{12}	26 July 1998	list
(48926) 1998 OV_{13}	26 July 1998	list
(48927) 1998 OU_{14}	26 July 1998	list
(49026) 1998 QW_{98}	26 August 1998	list
(49027) 1998 QA_{99}	26 August 1998	list
(49028) 1998 QM_{99}	26 August 1998	list
(49029) 1998 QN_{102}	26 August 1998	list
(49030) 1998 QL_{103}	26 August 1998	list
(49031) 1998 QT_{103}	26 August 1998	list
(49032) 1998 QS_{104}	26 August 1998	list
(49033) 1998 QL_{105}	25 August 1998	list
(49034) 1998 QS_{105}	25 August 1998	list
(49035) 1998 QX_{106}	25 August 1998	list
(49174) 1998 SA_{64}	20 September 1998	list
(49175) 1998 SG_{65}	20 September 1998	list
(49176) 1998 SS_{65}	20 September 1998	list
(49177) 1998 SU_{65}	20 September 1998	list
(49178) 1998 SB_{67}	20 September 1998	list
(49179) 1998 SC_{67}	20 September 1998	list
(49180) 1998 SE_{67}	20 September 1998	list
(49181) 1998 SU_{67}	20 September 1998	list
(49183) 1998 SW_{72}	21 September 1998	list
(49184) 1998 SW_{73}	21 September 1998	list
(49185) 1998 SA_{74}	21 September 1998	list
(49233) 1998 SE_{145}	20 September 1998	list
(49234) 1998 SL_{146}	20 September 1998	list
(49235) 1998 SZ_{146}	20 September 1998	list
(49239) 1998 SE_{164}	18 September 1998	list
(49240) 1998 SF_{164}	18 September 1998	list
(49283) 1998 UG_{29}	18 October 1998	list
(49284) 1998 US_{29}	18 October 1998	list
(49285) 1998 UT_{29}	18 October 1998	list
(49286) 1998 UC_{30}	18 October 1998	list
49700 Mather	1 November 1999	list^{[G]}
(50558) 2000 EN_{26}	4 March 2000	list^{[H]}
52270 Noamchomsky	13 February 1988	list
(52279) 1989 CH_{3}	4 February 1989	list
(52281) 1989 SJ_{1}	26 September 1989	list
(52282) 1989 SO_{2}	26 September 1989	list
(52283) 1989 SE_{5}	26 September 1989	list
(52288) 1990 QU_{8}	16 August 1990	list
(52289) 1990 QH_{9}	16 August 1990	list
52295 Köppen	15 November 1990	list
(52296) 1990 WM_{3}	19 November 1990	list
(52298) 1991 GM_{7}	8 April 1991	list
(52336) 1992 OE_{7}	26 July 1992	list
(52339) 1992 RO_{2}	2 September 1992	list
(52342) 1992 SK_{19}	22 September 1992	list
52344 Yehudimenuhin	18 December 1992	list
(52386) 1993 OF_{6}	20 July 1993	list
52387 Huitzilopochtli	20 July 1993	list
(52388) 1993 PV_{4}	15 August 1993	list
(52389) 1993 PP_{5}	15 August 1993	list
(52390) 1993 QS_{4}	18 August 1993	list
(52391) 1993 QP_{5}	17 August 1993	list
(52392) 1993 RG_{5}	15 September 1993	list
(52393) 1993 RH_{5}	15 September 1993	list
(52394) 1993 RF_{6}	15 September 1993	list
(52395) 1993 RJ_{6}	15 September 1993	list
(52396) 1993 RC_{7}	15 September 1993	list
(52397) 1993 RF_{7}	15 September 1993	list
(52398) 1993 RT_{7}	15 September 1993	list
(52399) 1993 RM_{15}	15 September 1993	list^{[E]}
(52400) 1993 SG_{14}	16 September 1993	list^{[E]}
(52403) 1993 TQ_{17}	9 October 1993	list
(52404) 1993 TD_{20}	9 October 1993	list
(52405) 1993 TV_{22}	9 October 1993	list
(52406) 1993 TV_{23}	9 October 1993	list
(52407) 1993 TC_{31}	9 October 1993	list
(52408) 1993 TJ_{34}	9 October 1993	list
(52409) 1993 UW_{5}	20 October 1993	list
(52410) 1993 UG_{6}	20 October 1993	list
(52413) 1994 BF_{4}	16 January 1994	list^{[D]}
(52414) 1994 CV_{17}	8 February 1994	list
(52415) 1994 EP_{6}	9 March 1994	list
(52425) 1994 LU_{8}	8 June 1994	list^{[E]}
(52428) 1994 PE_{4}	10 August 1994	list
(52429) 1994 PK_{6}	10 August 1994	list
(52430) 1994 PF_{8}	10 August 1994	list
(52431) 1994 PS_{10}	10 August 1994	list
(52432) 1994 PG_{11}	10 August 1994	list
(52433) 1994 PZ_{15}	10 August 1994	list
(52434) 1994 PA_{17}	10 August 1994	list
(52435) 1994 PM_{25}	12 August 1994	list
(52436) 1994 PM_{26}	12 August 1994	list
(52437) 1994 PY_{27}	12 August 1994	list
(52438) 1994 PQ_{32}	12 August 1994	list
(52456) 1995 AY_{3}	2 January 1995	list
52457 Enquist	2 January 1995	list
(52512) 1996 GO_{19}	15 April 1996	list
(52515) 1996 HL_{12}	17 April 1996	list
(52516) 1996 HO_{20}	18 April 1996	list
(52517) 1996 HZ_{23}	20 April 1996	list
(52518) 1996 HE_{25}	20 April 1996	list
(52528) 1996 PM_{9}	8 August 1996	list
(52538) 1996 TT_{39}	8 October 1996	list
(52539) 1996 TB_{41}	8 October 1996	list
(52573) 1997 LM_{12}	7 June 1997	list
(52668) 1998 CA_{5}	6 February 1998	list
52681 Kelleghan	27 February 1998	list
(52682) 1998 DM_{34}	27 February 1998	list
(52683) 1998 DF_{35}	27 February 1998	list
(52686) 1998 EN_{11}	1 March 1998	list
(52687) 1998 EO_{13}	1 March 1998	list
(52746) 1998 HS_{149}	25 April 1998	list
52767 Ophelestes	28 June 1998	list
(52770) 1998 OD_{15}	26 July 1998	list
(52816) 1998 QX_{98}	26 August 1998	list
(52817) 1998 QF_{99}	26 August 1998	list
(52818) 1998 QH_{103}	26 August 1998	list
(52819) 1998 QK_{104}	26 August 1998	list
(52894) 1998 SL_{64}	20 September 1998	list
(52895) 1998 SE_{65}	20 September 1998	list
(52896) 1998 SC_{66}	20 September 1998	list
(52897) 1998 SE_{66}	20 September 1998	list
(52898) 1998 SO_{67}	20 September 1998	list
(52899) 1998 ST_{67}	20 September 1998	list
(52900) 1998 SO_{70}	21 September 1998	list
(52901) 1998 SK_{73}	21 September 1998	list
(52902) 1998 SN_{73}	21 September 1998	list
(52903) 1998 SG_{74}	21 September 1998	list
(52904) 1998 ST_{74}	21 September 1998	list
(52905) 1998 SN_{75}	21 September 1998	list
(52947) 1998 SY_{144}	20 September 1998	list
(52948) 1998 SH_{145}	20 September 1998	list
(52949) 1998 SK_{145}	20 September 1998	list
(52950) 1998 SB_{146}	20 September 1998	list
(52951) 1998 SO_{147}	20 September 1998	list
(52991) 1998 UM_{25}	18 October 1998	list
(52992) 1998 UB_{26}	18 October 1998	list
(52993) 1998 UT_{26}	18 October 1998	list
(52994) 1998 UY_{29}	18 October 1998	list
55737 Coquimbo	11 February 1988	list
(55742) 1990 QC_{10}	16 August 1990	list
(55745) 1990 SY_{7}	22 September 1990	list
(55746) 1990 SW_{9}	22 September 1990	list
(55748) 1990 VV_{11}	14 November 1990	list
(55750) 1991 GP_{8}	8 April 1991	list
(55761) 1992 CM_{2}	2 February 1992	list
(55762) 1992 CE_{3}	2 February 1992	list
(55768) 1992 GH_{4}	4 April 1992	list
(55771) 1992 PD_{1}	8 August 1992	list
(55773) 1993 BG_{6}	27 January 1993	list
(55786) 1993 OE_{3}	20 July 1993	list
(55787) 1993 OB_{10}	20 July 1993	list
(55788) 1993 PX_{6}	15 August 1993	list
(55789) 1993 RF_{11}	14 September 1993	list^{[E]}
(55790) 1993 RP_{15}	15 September 1993	list^{[E]}
(55793) 1993 SS_{4}	19 September 1993	list
(55794) 1993 TV_{14}	9 October 1993	list
(55795) 1993 TF_{18}	9 October 1993	list
(55797) 1994 CN_{15}	8 February 1994	list
(55798) 1994 ES_{5}	9 March 1994	list
(55799) 1994 EC_{6}	9 March 1994	list
(55800) 1994 ED_{7}	9 March 1994	list
(55801) 1994 PV_{4}	10 August 1994	list
(55802) 1994 PM_{6}	10 August 1994	list
(55803) 1994 PD_{7}	10 August 1994	list
(55804) 1994 PD_{13}	10 August 1994	list
(55805) 1994 PE_{15}	10 August 1994	list
(55806) 1994 PB_{26}	12 August 1994	list
(55807) 1994 PM_{38}	10 August 1994	list
(55809) 1994 RW_{15}	3 September 1994	list
(55833) 1996 GM_{18}	15 April 1996	list
(55834) 1996 GW_{18}	15 April 1996	list
(55836) 1996 HW_{22}	20 April 1996	list
(55841) 1996 NW_{4}	14 July 1996	list
(55853) 1996 TF_{52}	5 October 1996	list
(55909) 1998 EB_{11}	1 March 1998	list
(55910) 1998 EN_{12}	1 March 1998	list
(55911) 1998 EP_{12}	1 March 1998	list
(55971) 1998 OA_{9}	26 July 1998	list
(55990) 1998 SQ_{71}	21 September 1998	list
(55999) 1998 SK_{144}	18 September 1998	list
56000 Mesopotamia	20 September 1998	list
(56001) 1998 SR_{146}	20 September 1998	list
(56002) 1998 SJ_{147}	20 September 1998	list
(56014) 1998 UO_{25}	18 October 1998	list
(56015) 1998 UH_{26}	18 October 1998	list
(58150) 1988 CY_{4}	13 February 1988	list
(58151) 1988 CG_{7}	15 February 1988	list
(58157) 1989 GC_{3}	3 April 1989	list
(58159) 1989 SL_{4}	26 September 1989	list
(58160) 1989 SX_{4}	26 September 1989	list
(58161) 1989 SH_{5}	26 September 1989	list
(58162) 1989 TS_{6}	7 October 1989	list
(58168) 1990 QB_{9}	16 August 1990	list
(58170) 1990 SB_{5}	22 September 1990	list
(58171) 1990 SC_{5}	22 September 1990	list
(58172) 1990 SD_{8}	22 September 1990	list
(58179) 1990 UN_{3}	16 October 1990	list
(58180) 1990 WG_{6}	21 November 1990	list
(58182) 1991 PX_{2}	2 August 1991	list
(58211) 1992 HF_{4}	23 April 1992	list
(58212) 1992 OQ_{5}	30 July 1992	list
58214 Amorim	2 September 1992	list
(58218) 1992 UZ_{7}	23 October 1992	list
(58220) 1993 BY_{4}	27 January 1993	list
58221 Boston	23 January 1993	list
(58243) 1993 NG_{1}	12 July 1993	list
(58244) 1993 OX_{5}	20 July 1993	list
(58245) 1993 OS_{7}	20 July 1993	list
(58246) 1993 OP_{12}	19 July 1993	list
(58247) 1993 PH_{3}	14 August 1993	list
(58248) 1993 PO_{5}	15 August 1993	list
(58249) 1993 PC_{6}	15 August 1993	list
(58250) 1993 QU_{1}	16 August 1993	list
(58251) 1993 QS_{2}	16 August 1993	list
(58252) 1993 QG_{4}	18 August 1993	list
(58253) 1993 QJ_{5}	17 August 1993	list
(58254) 1993 QN_{5}	17 August 1993	list
(58255) 1993 RS_{5}	15 September 1993	list
(58256) 1993 RL_{7}	15 September 1993	list
(58257) 1993 RN_{9}	14 September 1993	list^{[E]}
(58258) 1993 RU_{10}	14 September 1993	list^{[E]}
(58259) 1993 RA_{13}	14 September 1993	list^{[E]}
(58263) 1993 SO_{4}	19 September 1993	list
(58264) 1993 SW_{7}	17 September 1993	list
(58266) 1993 TN_{15}	9 October 1993	list
(58267) 1993 TB_{16}	9 October 1993	list
(58268) 1993 TQ_{19}	9 October 1993	list
(58269) 1993 TG_{20}	9 October 1993	list
(58270) 1993 TK_{22}	9 October 1993	list
(58271) 1993 TT_{22}	9 October 1993	list
(58272) 1993 TZ_{27}	9 October 1993	list
(58273) 1993 TA_{31}	9 October 1993	list
(58274) 1993 TY_{31}	9 October 1993	list
(58275) 1993 TR_{32}	9 October 1993	list
(58276) 1993 TB_{33}	9 October 1993	list
(58277) 1993 TW_{33}	9 October 1993	list
(58278) 1993 TA_{34}	9 October 1993	list
58279 Kamerlingh	11 October 1993	list
(58281) 1993 UR_{5}	20 October 1993	list
(58282) 1993 UB_{6}	20 October 1993	list
(58283) 1993 UO_{7}	20 October 1993	list
(58288) 1994 CF_{14}	8 February 1994	list
(58289) 1994 CC_{16}	8 February 1994	list
(58290) 1994 CH_{17}	8 February 1994	list
(58297) 1994 PA_{3}	10 August 1994	list
(58298) 1994 PB_{3}	10 August 1994	list
(58299) 1994 PH_{3}	10 August 1994	list
(58300) 1994 PQ_{5}	10 August 1994	list
(58301) 1994 PB_{8}	10 August 1994	list
(58302) 1994 PX_{8}	10 August 1994	list
(58303) 1994 PY_{9}	10 August 1994	list
(58304) 1994 PP_{10}	10 August 1994	list
(58305) 1994 PM_{11}	10 August 1994	list
(58306) 1994 PA_{12}	10 August 1994	list
(58307) 1994 PM_{13}	10 August 1994	list
(58308) 1994 PE_{16}	10 August 1994	list
(58309) 1994 PV_{17}	10 August 1994	list
(58310) 1994 PT_{20}	12 August 1994	list
(58311) 1994 PA_{22}	12 August 1994	list
(58312) 1994 PO_{23}	12 August 1994	list
(58313) 1994 PX_{27}	12 August 1994	list
(58314) 1994 PE_{29}	12 August 1994	list
(58315) 1994 PV_{29}	12 August 1994	list
(58316) 1994 PR_{30}	12 August 1994	list
(58317) 1994 PB_{33}	12 August 1994	list
(58318) 1994 PW_{37}	10 August 1994	list
(58319) 1994 PZ_{37}	10 August 1994	list
(58320) 1994 PE_{38}	10 August 1994	list
(58321) 1994 PQ_{38}	10 August 1994	list
(58322) 1994 PU_{38}	10 August 1994	list
(58323) 1994 PK_{39}	10 August 1994	list
(58326) 1994 RQ_{16}	3 September 1994	list
(58339) 1994 WB_{12}	27 November 1994	list
(58432) 1996 FY_{17}	22 March 1996	list
(58433) 1996 FN_{18}	22 March 1996	list
(58439) 1996 GF_{20}	15 April 1996	list
(58442) 1996 HR_{9}	17 April 1996	list
(58443) 1996 HO_{12}	17 April 1996	list
(58444) 1996 HR_{12}	17 April 1996	list
(58445) 1996 HU_{16}	18 April 1996	list
(58446) 1996 HN_{22}	18 April 1996	list
(58447) 1996 HF_{24}	20 April 1996	list
(58448) 1996 HO_{25}	20 April 1996	list
(58449) 1996 HC_{26}	20 April 1996	list
(58459) 1996 KK_{8}	22 May 1996	list
(58464) 1996 NQ_{2}	14 July 1996	list
(58465) 1996 NY_{3}	14 July 1996	list
(58491) 1996 TG_{38}	8 October 1996	list
(58493) 1996 TJ_{52}	5 October 1996	list
(58560) 1997 LK_{11}	7 June 1997	list
(58710) 1998 CH_{3}	6 February 1998	list
(58711) 1998 CM_{3}	6 February 1998	list
(58712) 1998 CX_{4}	6 February 1998	list
(58732) 1998 DL_{34}	27 February 1998	list
(58733) 1998 DH_{35}	27 February 1998	list
(58738) 1998 EX_{10}	1 March 1998	list
(58739) 1998 EZ_{11}	1 March 1998	list
(58740) 1998 ES_{12}	1 March 1998	list
(58741) 1998 EZ_{12}	1 March 1998	list
(58742) 1998 EG_{13}	1 March 1998	list
(58743) 1998 EJ_{13}	1 March 1998	list
(58744) 1998 EN_{13}	1 March 1998	list
(58816) 1998 GU_{10}	2 April 1998	list
(58863) 1998 HA_{102}	25 April 1998	list
(58892) 1998 HP_{148}	25 April 1998	list
(58925) 1998 LZ_{2}	1 June 1998	list
58931 Palmys	28 June 1998	list
(58933) 1998 ON_{10}	26 July 1998	list
(58934) 1998 OK_{13}	26 July 1998	list
(58935) 1998 ON_{14}	26 July 1998	list
(58960) 1998 QH_{99}	26 August 1998	list
(58961) 1998 QG_{100}	26 August 1998	list
(58962) 1998 QJ_{100}	26 August 1998	list
(58963) 1998 QR_{100}	26 August 1998	list
(58964) 1998 QJ_{104}	26 August 1998	list
(59009) 1998 SZ_{65}	20 September 1998	list
(59011) 1998 SD_{71}	21 September 1998	list
(59012) 1998 SW_{71}	21 September 1998	list
(59013) 1998 SL_{72}	21 September 1998	list
(59014) 1998 SC_{74}	21 September 1998	list
(59015) 1998 SH_{74}	21 September 1998	list
(59038) 1998 SG_{147}	20 September 1998	list
(59060) 1998 UE_{25}	18 October 1998	list
(59061) 1998 UP_{25}	18 October 1998	list
(59062) 1998 US_{25}	18 October 1998	list
(65147) 2002 CN_{116}	15 February 2002	list^{[E]}
65210 Stichius	2 March 2002	list^{[E]}
(65669) 1988 CJ_{4}	13 February 1988	list
(65670) 1988 CS_{5}	13 February 1988	list
(65676) 1989 CC_{3}	4 February 1989	list
(65678) 1989 SU_{2}	26 September 1989	list
(65680) 1990 EH_{1}	2 March 1990	list
(65681) 1990 EO_{1}	2 March 1990	list
(65689) 1990 WM_{4}	16 November 1990	list
(65693) 1991 RO_{11}	4 September 1991	list
(65699) 1991 VY_{5}	2 November 1991	list
(65700) 1991 VW_{6}	9 November 1991	list
(65701) 1992 BY_{1}	30 January 1992	list
(65705) 1992 GH_{3}	4 April 1992	list
(65707) 1992 PY_{1}	8 August 1992	list
(65709) 1992 RP_{1}	2 September 1992	list
(65710) 1992 RT_{1}	2 September 1992	list
(65711) 1992 RJ_{2}	2 September 1992	list
(65729) 1993 JQ	14 May 1993	list
(65731) 1993 OH_{6}	20 July 1993	list
(65732) 1993 OJ_{10}	20 July 1993	list
(65734) 1993 PU_{4}	15 August 1993	list
(65735) 1993 QY_{3}	18 August 1993	list
(65736) 1993 QH_{7}	20 August 1993	list
(65737) 1993 RE_{7}	15 September 1993	list
(65738) 1993 RE_{9}	14 September 1993	list^{[E]}
(65739) 1993 SG_{13}	16 September 1993	list^{[E]}
(65741) 1993 TB_{14}	9 October 1993	list
(65742) 1993 TY_{18}	9 October 1993	list
(65743) 1993 TY_{19}	9 October 1993	list
(65744) 1993 TR_{23}	9 October 1993	list
(65745) 1993 TT_{31}	9 October 1993	list
(65746) 1993 TX_{34}	9 October 1993	list
(65747) 1993 TE_{38}	9 October 1993	list
(65748) 1993 TS_{38}	9 October 1993	list
(65749) 1993 TT_{38}	9 October 1993	list
(65752) 1994 CY_{10}	7 February 1994	list
(65753) 1994 CZ_{17}	8 February 1994	list
(65754) 1994 CP_{18}	8 February 1994	list
(65758) 1994 PG_{3}	10 August 1994	list
(65759) 1994 PA_{4}	10 August 1994	list
(65760) 1994 PD_{21}	12 August 1994	list
(65805) 1996 HO_{14}	17 April 1996	list
(65806) 1996 HW_{18}	18 April 1996	list
(65818) 1996 TP_{39}	8 October 1996	list
(65819) 1996 TE_{40}	8 October 1996	list
(65820) 1996 TR_{40}	8 October 1996	list
65859 Mädler	9 April 1997	list
(65862) 1997 JN_{11}	3 May 1997	list
(65907) 1998 EX_{11}	1 March 1998	list
(65998) 1998 MX_{40}	28 June 1998	list
(66004) 1998 OV_{9}	26 July 1998	list
(66006) 1998 OW_{13}	26 July 1998	list
(66059) 1998 QZ_{100}	26 August 1998	list
(66060) 1998 QB_{103}	26 August 1998	list
(66061) 1998 QN_{104}	26 August 1998	list
(66118) 1998 SL_{71}	21 September 1998	list
(66119) 1998 SE_{72}	21 September 1998	list
(66120) 1998 SF_{74}	21 September 1998	list
(66142) 1998 SN_{145}	20 September 1998	list
(66156) 1998 UV_{25}	18 October 1998	list
(66157) 1998 UJ_{26}	18 October 1998	list
(66158) 1998 UJ_{27}	18 October 1998	list
(66834) 1999 UT_{46}	31 October 1999	list
69263 Big Ben	29 January 1987	list
(69271) 1989 GK_{2}	3 April 1989	list
(69272) 1989 SC_{2}	26 September 1989	list
(69276) 1989 YH_{8}	31 December 1989	list
(69277) 1990 EC_{1}	2 March 1990	list
(69278) 1990 EK_{2}	2 March 1990	list
(69279) 1990 ES_{2}	2 March 1990	list
(69281) 1990 SG_{6}	22 September 1990	list
(69282) 1990 SV_{6}	22 September 1990	list
(69283) 1990 ST_{7}	22 September 1990	list
(69284) 1990 SB_{9}	22 September 1990	list
(69290) 1990 UQ_{4}	16 October 1990	list
(69291) 1990 WG_{1}	18 November 1990	list
(69292) 1990 WH_{2}	18 November 1990	list
(69293) 1991 GW_{10}	10 April 1991	list
(69308) 1992 PK_{1}	8 August 1992	list
(69309) 1992 PL_{1}	8 August 1992	list
(69310) 1992 PQ_{1}	8 August 1992	list
(69313) 1992 SW_{18}	22 September 1992	list
(69314) 1992 SW_{21}	22 September 1992	list
(69333) 1993 OU_{8}	20 July 1993	list
(69335) 1993 RT_{6}	15 September 1993	list
(69337) 1993 SQ_{5}	17 September 1993	list
(69340) 1993 TA_{15}	9 October 1993	list
(69341) 1993 TD_{18}	9 October 1993	list
(69342) 1993 TT_{19}	9 October 1993	list
(69343) 1993 TO_{29}	9 October 1993	list
(69344) 1993 TH_{30}	9 October 1993	list
(69345) 1993 TE_{31}	9 October 1993	list
(69346) 1993 TV_{32}	9 October 1993	list
(69347) 1993 TM_{41}	9 October 1993	list
(69348) 1993 UH_{8}	20 October 1993	list
(69355) 1994 CM_{12}	7 February 1994	list
(69356) 1994 CA_{17}	8 February 1994	list
(69358) 1994 PC_{9}	10 August 1994	list
(69359) 1994 PH_{10}	10 August 1994	list
(69360) 1994 PJ_{12}	10 August 1994	list
(69361) 1994 PA_{13}	10 August 1994	list
(69362) 1994 PX_{13}	10 August 1994	list
(69363) 1994 PK_{14}	10 August 1994	list
(69364) 1994 PU_{30}	12 August 1994	list
(69432) 1996 HC_{18}	18 April 1996	list
(69433) 1996 HY_{18}	18 April 1996	list
69434 de Gerlache	18 April 1996	list
(69435) 1996 HH_{21}	18 April 1996	list
(69441) 1996 PG_{8}	8 August 1996	list
(69459) 1996 TX_{62}	6 October 1996	list
(69514) 1997 EQ_{46}	12 March 1997	list
(69515) 1997 EM_{47}	12 March 1997	list
(69539) 1997 GO_{40}	7 April 1997	list
(69546) 1997 JO_{13}	3 May 1997	list
(69577) 1998 CE_{5}	6 February 1998	list
(69586) 1998 DE_{36}	25 February 1998	list
(69591) 1998 EV_{13}	1 March 1998	list
(69592) 1998 EO_{14}	1 March 1998	list
(69673) 1998 GX_{10}	2 April 1998	list
(69729) 1998 HE_{149}	25 April 1998	list
(69730) 1998 HF_{149}	25 April 1998	list
69754 Mosesmendel	26 June 1998	list
(69755) 1998 MQ_{40}	26 June 1998	list
(69758) 1998 OP_{10}	26 July 1998	list
(69759) 1998 OT_{10}	26 July 1998	list
(69794) 1998 QM_{104}	26 August 1998	list
69870 Fizeau	20 September 1998	list
(69871) 1998 SW_{64}	20 September 1998	list
(69872) 1998 SY_{70}	21 September 1998	list
(69873) 1998 SB_{71}	21 September 1998	list
(69874) 1998 SQ_{73}	21 September 1998	list
(69875) 1998 SB_{74}	21 September 1998	list
(69876) 1998 SV_{74}	21 September 1998	list
(69905) 1998 SA_{146}	20 September 1998	list
(69906) 1998 SU_{146}	20 September 1998	list
(69907) 1998 SW_{146}	20 September 1998	list
(69939) 1998 UQ_{25}	18 October 1998	list
(69940) 1998 UD_{26}	18 October 1998	list
(69941) 1998 UL_{30}	18 October 1998	list
(73676) 1988 CD_{5}	13 February 1988	list
(73679) 1989 SQ_{2}	26 September 1989	list
(73685) 1990 SE_{9}	22 September 1990	list
(73688) 1990 VA_{5}	15 November 1990	list
(73690) 1991 PU_{2}	2 August 1991	list
(73691) 1991 PB_{3}	2 August 1991	list
(73712) 1992 RB_{4}	2 September 1992	list
(73713) 1992 RW_{6}	2 September 1992	list
(73715) 1992 SC_{21}	22 September 1992	list
(73717) 1993 BV_{4}	27 January 1993	list
(73718) 1993 BL_{5}	27 January 1993	list
(73734) 1993 OT_{12}	19 July 1993	list
(73735) 1993 QE_{3}	18 August 1993	list
(73736) 1993 QT_{6}	20 August 1993	list
(73737) 1993 RH_{4}	15 September 1993	list
(73738) 1993 RK_{6}	15 September 1993	list
(73739) 1993 SV_{5}	17 September 1993	list
(73740) 1993 TZ_{14}	9 October 1993	list
(73741) 1993 TY_{15}	9 October 1993	list
(73742) 1993 TB_{19}	9 October 1993	list
(73743) 1993 TS_{19}	9 October 1993	list
(73744) 1993 TJ_{22}	9 October 1993	list
(73745) 1993 TH_{23}	9 October 1993	list
(73746) 1993 TY_{24}	9 October 1993	list
(73747) 1993 TX_{25}	9 October 1993	list
(73748) 1993 TF_{26}	9 October 1993	list
(73749) 1993 TG_{37}	9 October 1993	list
(73750) 1993 TT_{41}	9 October 1993	list
(73751) 1993 UK_{8}	20 October 1993	list
(73756) 1994 CS_{9}	7 February 1994	list
(73757) 1994 CH_{10}	7 February 1994	list
(73758) 1994 CB_{11}	7 February 1994	list
(73759) 1994 CQ_{15}	8 February 1994	list
(73760) 1994 CT_{17}	8 February 1994	list
(73764) 1994 NB_{2}	4 July 1994	list
(73765) 1994 PA_{9}	10 August 1994	list
(73766) 1994 PH_{9}	10 August 1994	list
73767 Bibiandersson	10 August 1994	list
(73768) 1994 PO_{10}	10 August 1994	list
73769 Delphi	10 August 1994	list
(73770) 1994 PG_{14}	10 August 1994	list
(73771) 1994 PR_{14}	10 August 1994	list
(73772) 1994 PM_{15}	10 August 1994	list
(73773) 1994 PZ_{18}	12 August 1994	list
(73774) 1994 PH_{19}	12 August 1994	list
(73775) 1994 PB_{24}	12 August 1994	list
(73776) 1994 PJ_{27}	12 August 1994	list
(73777) 1994 PD_{34}	10 August 1994	list
(73778) 1994 PP_{37}	10 August 1994	list
(73780) 1994 RR_{22}	5 September 1994	list
(73841) 1996 HY_{17}	18 April 1996	list
(73842) 1996 HO_{22}	18 April 1996	list
(73851) 1996 TK_{62}	6 October 1996	list
(73899) 1997 EV_{49}	5 March 1997	list
(73914) 1997 GN_{40}	7 April 1997	list
(73922) 1997 LZ_{12}	7 June 1997	list
(73988) 1998 EJ_{11}	1 March 1998	list
(73989) 1998 ED_{12}	1 March 1998	list
(73990) 1998 EU_{12}	1 March 1998	list
(74020) 1998 GW_{10}	2 April 1998	list
(74045) 1998 HG_{102}	25 April 1998	list
(74046) 1998 HX_{102}	25 April 1998	list
(74077) 1998 MA_{47}	28 June 1998	list
(74084) 1998 OA_{10}	26 July 1998	list
(74087) 1998 OS_{13}	26 July 1998	list
(74088) 1998 OK_{14}	26 July 1998	list
(74159) 1998 QA_{100}	26 August 1998	list
(74160) 1998 QE_{101}	26 August 1998	list
(74161) 1998 QF_{101}	26 August 1998	list
(74162) 1998 QR_{102}	26 August 1998	list
(74163) 1998 QA_{104}	26 August 1998	list
(74164) 1998 QL_{104}	26 August 1998	list
(74165) 1998 QU_{104}	26 August 1998	list
(74247) 1998 SR_{64}	20 September 1998	list
(74248) 1998 SS_{64}	20 September 1998	list
(74249) 1998 SB_{65}	20 September 1998	list
(74250) 1998 SN_{65}	20 September 1998	list
(74251) 1998 SV_{66}	20 September 1998	list
(74252) 1998 SS_{72}	21 September 1998	list
(74253) 1998 SR_{74}	21 September 1998	list
(74254) 1998 SA_{75}	21 September 1998	list
(74295) 1998 SR_{147}	20 September 1998	list
(74296) 1998 SV_{147}	20 September 1998	list
(74297) 1998 SZ_{147}	20 September 1998	list
(74322) 1998 UN_{26}	18 October 1998	list
(74323) 1998 UM_{29}	18 October 1998	list
(78955) 2003 SQ_{221}	26 September 2003	list^{[E]}
(79118) 1989 GY_{5}	5 April 1989	list
(79120) 1989 TS_{4}	7 October 1989	list
(79121) 1990 EG_{1}	2 March 1990	list
(79125) 1990 SZ_{4}	22 September 1990	list
(79126) 1990 SO_{6}	22 September 1990	list
(79127) 1990 SK_{8}	22 September 1990	list
(79131) 1990 UN_{4}	16 October 1990	list
(79132) 1990 VR_{4}	15 November 1990	list
(79133) 1990 VG_{5}	15 November 1990	list
(79134) 1990 VO_{8}	15 November 1990	list
(79143) 1992 BQ_{2}	30 January 1992	list
79144 Cervantes	2 February 1992	list
(79147) 1992 RG_{3}	2 September 1992	list
(79185) 1993 OZ_{3}	20 July 1993	list
(79187) 1993 QL_{8}	20 August 1993	list
(79188) 1993 QF_{9}	20 August 1993	list
(79189) 1993 RB_{8}	15 September 1993	list
(79191) 1993 TU_{14}	9 October 1993	list
(79192) 1993 TG_{16}	9 October 1993	list
(79193) 1993 TW_{17}	9 October 1993	list
(79194) 1993 TZ_{18}	9 October 1993	list
(79195) 1993 TZ_{24}	9 October 1993	list
(79196) 1993 TD_{33}	9 October 1993	list
(79197) 1993 TE_{33}	9 October 1993	list
(79198) 1993 TL_{33}	9 October 1993	list
(79199) 1993 TN_{37}	9 October 1993	list
(79200) 1993 UH_{4}	20 October 1993	list
(79201) 1993 UY_{4}	20 October 1993	list
(79202) 1993 UV_{5}	20 October 1993	list
(79203) 1993 UC_{6}	20 October 1993	list
(79204) 1993 UH_{7}	20 October 1993	list
(79205) 1993 UN_{8}	20 October 1993	list
(79210) 1994 CX_{17}	8 February 1994	list
(79211) 1994 CB_{18}	8 February 1994	list
(79221) 1994 PN_{7}	10 August 1994	list
(79222) 1994 PQ_{8}	10 August 1994	list
(79223) 1994 PM_{12}	10 August 1994	list
(79224) 1994 PS_{12}	10 August 1994	list
(79225) 1994 PF_{16}	10 August 1994	list
(79226) 1994 PM_{16}	10 August 1994	list
(79227) 1994 PK_{17}	10 August 1994	list
(79228) 1994 PP_{17}	10 August 1994	list
(79229) 1994 PE_{20}	12 August 1994	list
(79230) 1994 PP_{21}	12 August 1994	list
(79231) 1994 PO_{22}	12 August 1994	list
(79232) 1994 PH_{25}	12 August 1994	list
(79233) 1994 PK_{25}	12 August 1994	list
(79234) 1994 PC_{26}	12 August 1994	list
(79235) 1994 PQ_{28}	12 August 1994	list
(79236) 1994 PB_{31}	12 August 1994	list
(79237) 1994 PC_{31}	12 August 1994	list
(79238) 1994 PM_{36}	10 August 1994	list
(79239) 1994 PY_{37}	10 August 1994	list
(79245) 1994 RL_{23}	5 September 1994	list
(79317) 1996 HL_{21}	18 April 1996	list
(79318) 1996 HY_{22}	20 April 1996	list
(79319) 1996 HS_{24}	20 April 1996	list
(79320) 1996 HS_{25}	20 April 1996	list
(79323) 1996 PM_{7}	8 August 1996	list
(79324) 1996 PH_{8}	8 August 1996	list
(79326) 1996 QQ_{3}	18 August 1996	list
(79339) 1996 TG_{41}	8 October 1996	list
(79340) 1996 TO_{41}	8 October 1996	list
(79374) 1997 EB_{59}	11 March 1997	list
(79409) 1997 JX_{11}	3 May 1997	list
79410 Wallerius	3 May 1997	list
(79411) 1997 JY_{12}	3 May 1997	list
(79412) 1997 JO_{14}	3 May 1997	list
(79413) 1997 JQ_{14}	3 May 1997	list
(79414) 1997 JU_{15}	3 May 1997	list
(79415) 1997 JY_{15}	3 May 1997	list
(79416) 1997 JE_{18}	3 May 1997	list
(79481) 1998 EO_{12}	1 March 1998	list
(79482) 1998 EX_{12}	1 March 1998	list
(79483) 1998 ET_{19}	3 March 1998	list
(79524) 1998 OY_{9}	26 July 1998	list
(79525) 1998 OZ_{9}	26 July 1998	list
(79527) 1998 OL_{14}	26 July 1998	list
(79577) 1998 QX_{99}	26 August 1998	list
(79578) 1998 QD_{100}	26 August 1998	list
(79579) 1998 QY_{102}	26 August 1998	list
(79580) 1998 QW_{103}	26 August 1998	list
(79581) 1998 QC_{106}	25 August 1998	list
(79695) 1998 SA_{66}	20 September 1998	list
(79696) 1998 SZ_{66}	20 September 1998	list
(79698) 1998 SE_{71}	21 September 1998	list
(79699) 1998 SH_{73}	21 September 1998	list
(79700) 1998 SX_{73}	21 September 1998	list
(79701) 1998 SM_{75}	21 September 1998	list
(79744) 1998 SB_{145}	20 September 1998	list
(79745) 1998 SY_{147}	20 September 1998	list
(79751) 1998 SM_{166}	21 September 1998	list
(85169) 1989 SN_{2}	26 September 1989	list
(85170) 1989 TZ_{3}	7 October 1989	list
(85171) 1989 TZ_{6}	7 October 1989	list
(85172) 1990 QU_{6}	20 August 1990	list
(85173) 1990 QV_{6}	20 August 1990	list
(85174) 1990 QN_{8}	16 August 1990	list
(85181) 1990 VF_{6}	15 November 1990	list
85183 Marcelaymé	18 January 1991	list
85185 Lederman	6 June 1991	list
(85186) 1991 PR_{2}	2 August 1991	list
(85192) 1991 RS_{11}	4 September 1991	list
(85209) 1992 GM_{3}	4 April 1992	list
(85211) 1992 PL	8 August 1992	list
(85213) 1992 RN_{7}	2 September 1992	list
(85237) 1993 NE_{2}	12 July 1993	list
(85239) 1993 OB_{7}	20 July 1993	list
(85240) 1993 OT_{11}	19 July 1993	list
(85241) 1993 PC_{3}	14 August 1993	list
(85242) 1993 QP_{4}	18 August 1993	list
(85243) 1993 QG_{8}	20 August 1993	list
(85244) 1993 QB_{9}	20 August 1993	list
(85246) 1993 RL_{4}	15 September 1993	list
(85247) 1993 RE_{5}	15 September 1993	list
(85248) 1993 RR_{6}	15 September 1993	list
(85249) 1993 RT_{11}	14 September 1993	list^{[E]}
(85250) 1993 RQ_{16}	15 September 1993	list^{[E]}
(85251) 1993 RJ_{18}	15 September 1993	list^{[E]}
(85252) 1993 SX_{12}	16 September 1993	list^{[E]}
(85255) 1993 TZ_{13}	9 October 1993	list
(85256) 1993 TC_{14}	9 October 1993	list
(85257) 1993 TT_{14}	9 October 1993	list
(85258) 1993 TE_{16}	9 October 1993	list
(85259) 1993 TO_{19}	9 October 1993	list
(85260) 1993 TC_{23}	9 October 1993	list
(85261) 1993 TO_{23}	9 October 1993	list
(85262) 1993 TE_{32}	9 October 1993	list
(85263) 1993 TU_{37}	9 October 1993	list
(85264) 1993 TN_{46}	11 October 1993	list
(85273) 1994 CW_{13}	8 February 1994	list
(85276) 1994 PY_{4}	10 August 1994	list
(85277) 1994 PH_{5}	10 August 1994	list
(85278) 1994 PU_{8}	10 August 1994	list
(85279) 1994 PM_{10}	10 August 1994	list
(85280) 1994 PU_{14}	10 August 1994	list
(85281) 1994 PZ_{16}	10 August 1994	list
(85282) 1994 PE_{19}	12 August 1994	list
(85283) 1994 PO_{21}	12 August 1994	list
(85284) 1994 PT_{21}	12 August 1994	list
(85285) 1994 PE_{23}	12 August 1994	list
(85286) 1994 PA_{27}	12 August 1994	list
(85287) 1994 PM_{29}	12 August 1994	list
(85288) 1994 PC_{30}	12 August 1994	list
(85289) 1994 PJ_{32}	12 August 1994	list
(85290) 1994 PZ_{32}	12 August 1994	list
(85291) 1994 PF_{33}	10 August 1994	list
(85292) 1994 RA_{18}	3 September 1994	list
(85353) 1995 UE_{46}	20 October 1995	list
(85377) 1996 GZ_{17}	15 April 1996	list
(85378) 1996 GD_{19}	15 April 1996	list
(85379) 1996 HY_{24}	20 April 1996	list
(85385) 1996 NJ_{5}	14 July 1996	list
(85387) 1996 PF_{7}	8 August 1996	list
(85390) 1996 QZ_{2}	18 August 1996	list
(85405) 1996 TO_{39}	8 October 1996	list
(85440) 1997 EB_{47}	12 March 1997	list
85466 Krastins	3 May 1997	list
(85474) 1997 LN_{15}	8 June 1997	list
(85475) 1997 LH_{17}	8 June 1997	list
(85583) 1998 EV_{10}	1 March 1998	list
(85584) 1998 EN_{20}	3 March 1998	list
(85618) 1998 HM_{102}	25 April 1998	list
(85634) 1998 LR_{2}	1 June 1998	list
(85642) 1998 OS_{8}	26 July 1998	list
(85643) 1998 OC_{10}	26 July 1998	list
(85644) 1998 OH_{10}	26 July 1998	list
(85645) 1998 OS_{11}	26 July 1998	list
(85646) 1998 OT_{14}	26 July 1998	list
(85673) 1998 QB_{102}	26 August 1998	list
(85674) 1998 QD_{103}	26 August 1998	list
(85722) 1998 SX_{63}	20 September 1998	list
(85723) 1998 SH_{67}	20 September 1998	list
(85727) 1998 SC_{75}	21 September 1998	list
(85751) 1998 SU_{144}	20 September 1998	list
(90702) 1988 CN_{5}	13 February 1988	list
(90706) 1989 GN_{2}	3 April 1989	list
(90707) 1989 GW_{5}	3 April 1989	list
(90708) 1990 EU	2 March 1990	list
(90714) 1990 VJ_{6}	15 November 1990	list
(90715) 1991 GE_{3}	8 April 1991	list
(90716) 1991 GY_{8}	8 April 1991	list
90717 Flanders	2 August 1991	list
90732 Opdebeeck	8 August 1992	list
(90746) 1993 NK_{1}	12 July 1993	list
(90748) 1993 QL_{4}	18 August 1993	list
(90749) 1993 QZ_{7}	20 August 1993	list
(90750) 1993 QJ_{8}	20 August 1993	list
(90751) 1993 QE_{9}	20 August 1993	list
(90753) 1993 RX_{4}	15 September 1993	list
(90754) 1993 RY_{4}	15 September 1993	list
(90755) 1993 RT_{5}	15 September 1993	list
(90756) 1993 RH_{9}	14 September 1993	list^{[E]}
(90757) 1993 RK_{13}	14 September 1993	list^{[E]}
(90758) 1993 RO_{14}	15 September 1993	list
(90759) 1993 SZ_{6}	17 September 1993	list
(90760) 1993 SN_{10}	22 September 1993	list^{[E]}
(90761) 1993 SW_{13}	16 September 1993	list^{[E]}
(90765) 1993 TX_{14}	9 October 1993	list
(90766) 1993 TN_{16}	9 October 1993	list
(90767) 1993 TJ_{17}	9 October 1993	list
(90768) 1993 TV_{17}	9 October 1993	list
(90769) 1993 TO_{20}	9 October 1993	list
(90770) 1993 TV_{20}	9 October 1993	list
(90771) 1993 TU_{32}	9 October 1993	list
(90774) 1993 UA_{5}	20 October 1993	list
(90775) 1993 UE_{5}	20 October 1993	list
(90779) 1994 CD_{14}	8 February 1994	list
(90780) 1994 CN_{17}	8 February 1994	list
(90781) 1994 EE_{6}	9 March 1994	list
(90786) 1994 PT_{17}	10 August 1994	list
(90787) 1994 PO_{19}	12 August 1994	list
(90788) 1994 PQ_{20}	12 August 1994	list
(90789) 1994 PP_{22}	12 August 1994	list
(90790) 1994 PA_{25}	12 August 1994	list
(90791) 1994 PG_{32}	12 August 1994	list
(90792) 1994 PC_{33}	12 August 1994	list
(90793) 1994 PF_{38}	10 August 1994	list
(90794) 1994 RK_{26}	5 September 1994	list
(90834) 1995 UR_{46}	20 October 1995	list
(90856) 1996 GL_{20}	15 April 1996	list
(90857) 1996 HN_{8}	17 April 1996	list
(90858) 1996 HJ_{19}	18 April 1996	list
(90859) 1996 HH_{20}	18 April 1996	list
(90860) 1996 HP_{20}	18 April 1996	list
(90872) 1996 TZ_{40}	8 October 1996	list
(90874) 1996 TX_{64}	3 October 1996	list
(91025) 1998 DJ_{34}	27 February 1998	list
(91026) 1998 DS_{34}	27 February 1998	list
(91032) 1998 EA_{11}	1 March 1998	list
(91033) 1998 ES_{19}	3 March 1998	list
(91097) 1998 GK_{12}	2 April 1998	list
(91140) 1998 LW_{1}	1 June 1998	list
91199 Johngray	20 September 1998	list
(95335) 2002 CU_{118}	3 February 2002	list^{[E]}
(96186) 1990 SF_{8}	22 September 1990	list
(96187) 1990 UH_{4}	16 October 1990	list
(96190) 1991 PD_{19}	2 August 1991	list
(96194) 1991 VF_{6}	2 November 1991	list
(96201) 1992 RK_{3}	2 September 1992	list
(96202) 1992 RR_{7}	2 September 1992	list
(96215) 1993 QR_{9}	20 August 1993	list
(96218) 1993 RZ_{14}	15 September 1993	list
(96219) 1993 SH_{5}	19 September 1993	list
(96220) 1993 SY_{13}	16 September 1993	list^{[E]}
(96223) 1993 TG_{14}	9 October 1993	list
(96224) 1993 TY_{17}	9 October 1993	list
(96225) 1993 TP_{18}	9 October 1993	list
(96226) 1993 TS_{18}	9 October 1993	list
(96227) 1993 TS_{22}	9 October 1993	list
(96228) 1993 TV_{25}	9 October 1993	list
(96229) 1993 TE_{30}	9 October 1993	list
(96230) 1993 TZ_{35}	11 October 1993	list
(96231) 1993 TF_{39}	9 October 1993	list
(96232) 1993 TU_{39}	9 October 1993	list
(96233) 1993 TA_{41}	9 October 1993	list
(96235) 1993 UB_{5}	20 October 1993	list
(96236) 1993 UL_{7}	20 October 1993	list
(96244) 1994 CA_{16}	8 February 1994	list
(96245) 1994 CA_{18}	8 February 1994	list
(96247) 1994 PT_{3}	10 August 1994	list
(96248) 1994 PX_{6}	10 August 1994	list
(96249) 1994 PD_{22}	12 August 1994	list
(96250) 1994 PE_{25}	12 August 1994	list
(96251) 1994 RL_{26}	5 September 1994	list
(96289) 1996 HZ_{12}	17 April 1996	list
(96290) 1996 HZ_{17}	18 April 1996	list
(96291) 1996 HQ_{20}	18 April 1996	list
(96292) 1996 HR_{20}	18 April 1996	list
(96293) 1996 HV_{22}	20 April 1996	list
(96302) 1996 TL_{39}	8 October 1996	list
96327 Ullmann	5 March 1997	list
(96409) 1998 EW_{10}	1 March 1998	list
(96410) 1998 ER_{12}	1 March 1998	list
(96411) 1998 EM_{13}	1 March 1998	list
(96412) 1998 EC_{14}	1 March 1998	list
(96413) 1998 ET_{14}	1 March 1998	list
(96414) 1998 EZ_{19}	3 March 1998	list
(96470) 1998 HR_{102}	25 April 1998	list
(96475) 1998 HL_{126}	25 April 1998	list
(96486) 1998 HZ_{148}	25 April 1998	list
(96517) 1998 QG_{99}	26 August 1998	list
(96575) 1998 UY_{28}	18 October 1998	list
(99909) 1994 PU_{2}	10 August 1994	list
100007 Peters	13 February 1988	list
(100013) 1989 CD_{3}	4 February 1989	list
(100014) 1989 SR_{4}	26 September 1989	list
(100018) 1989 TA_{5}	7 October 1989	list
(100021) 1990 QV_{7}	16 August 1990	list
(100022) 1990 SG_{5}	22 September 1990	list
(100023) 1990 SH_{5}	22 September 1990	list
(100024) 1990 SW_{6}	22 September 1990	list
(100025) 1990 SY_{6}	22 September 1990	list
(100026) 1990 ST_{9}	22 September 1990	list
(100030) 1990 WN_{1}	18 November 1990	list
(100032) 1991 GU_{6}	8 April 1991	list
(100034) 1991 PN_{1}	2 August 1991	list
(100074) 1992 OB_{2}	26 July 1992	list
(100075) 1992 PS_{1}	8 August 1992	list
(100076) 1992 PT_{1}	8 August 1992	list
(100078) 1992 RZ_{2}	2 September 1992	list
(100079) 1992 RZ_{4}	2 September 1992	list
(100080) 1992 RY_{6}	2 September 1992	list
(100120) 1993 OW_{4}	20 July 1993	list
(100121) 1993 OP_{7}	20 July 1993	list
(100123) 1993 QU_{5}	17 August 1993	list
(100124) 1993 QD_{7}	20 August 1993	list
(100125) 1993 QG_{7}	20 August 1993	list
(100126) 1993 QK_{7}	20 August 1993	list
(100127) 1993 QA_{8}	20 August 1993	list
(100128) 1993 QK_{8}	20 August 1993	list
(100131) 1993 RU_{5}	15 September 1993	list
(100132) 1993 RR_{8}	14 September 1993	list^{[E]}
100133 Demosthenes	15 September 1993	list
(100134) 1993 RT_{14}	15 September 1993	list
(100135) 1993 RR_{16}	15 September 1993	list^{[E]}
(100136) 1993 SM_{4}	19 September 1993	list
(100137) 1993 SD_{7}	17 September 1993	list
(100138) 1993 SN_{14}	16 September 1993	list^{[E]}
(100144) 1993 TM_{14}	9 October 1993	list
(100145) 1993 TW_{14}	9 October 1993	list
(100146) 1993 TQ_{15}	9 October 1993	list
(100147) 1993 TV_{15}	9 October 1993	list
(100148) 1993 TT_{16}	9 October 1993	list
(100149) 1993 TM_{17}	9 October 1993	list
(100150) 1993 TN_{17}	9 October 1993	list
(100151) 1993 TT_{17}	9 October 1993	list
(100152) 1993 TN_{19}	9 October 1993	list
(100153) 1993 TF_{20}	9 October 1993	list
(100154) 1993 TS_{23}	9 October 1993	list
(100155) 1993 TG_{25}	9 October 1993	list
(100156) 1993 TD_{26}	9 October 1993	list
(100157) 1993 TU_{26}	9 October 1993	list
(100158) 1993 TF_{27}	9 October 1993	list
(100159) 1993 TP_{27}	9 October 1993	list
(100160) 1993 TS_{27}	9 October 1993	list
(100161) 1993 TV_{28}	9 October 1993	list
(100162) 1993 TS_{30}	9 October 1993	list
(100163) 1993 TN_{32}	9 October 1993	list
(100164) 1993 TV_{38}	9 October 1993	list
(100165) 1993 TN_{41}	9 October 1993	list
(100168) 1993 UN_{4}	20 October 1993	list
(100169) 1993 UW_{4}	20 October 1993	list
(100170) 1993 UE_{8}	20 October 1993	list
(100171) 1993 UJ_{8}	20 October 1993	list
(100194) 1994 CK_{11}	7 February 1994	list
(100195) 1994 CR_{12}	7 February 1994	list
(100196) 1994 CL_{16}	8 February 1994	list
(100197) 1994 CQ_{17}	8 February 1994	list
(100212) 1994 PV_{3}	10 August 1994	list
(100213) 1994 PD_{4}	10 August 1994	list
(100214) 1994 PJ_{4}	10 August 1994	list
(100215) 1994 PV_{5}	10 August 1994	list
(100216) 1994 PQ_{6}	10 August 1994	list
(100217) 1994 PL_{7}	10 August 1994	list
(100218) 1994 PV_{7}	10 August 1994	list
(100219) 1994 PG_{8}	10 August 1994	list
(100220) 1994 PT_{10}	10 August 1994	list
(100221) 1994 PP_{12}	10 August 1994	list
(100222) 1994 PU_{12}	10 August 1994	list
(100223) 1994 PZ_{12}	10 August 1994	list
(100224) 1994 PO_{13}	10 August 1994	list
(100225) 1994 PS_{13}	10 August 1994	list
(100226) 1994 PJ_{16}	10 August 1994	list
(100227) 1994 PR_{16}	10 August 1994	list
(100228) 1994 PH_{17}	10 August 1994	list
100229 Jeanbailly	10 August 1994	list
(100230) 1994 PN_{18}	12 August 1994	list
100231 Monceau	12 August 1994	list
(100232) 1994 PU_{23}	12 August 1994	list
(100233) 1994 PL_{24}	12 August 1994	list
(100234) 1994 PS_{24}	12 August 1994	list
(100235) 1994 PX_{24}	12 August 1994	list
(100236) 1994 PS_{27}	12 August 1994	list
(100237) 1994 PG_{31}	12 August 1994	list
(100238) 1994 PY_{31}	12 August 1994	list
(100239) 1994 PE_{32}	12 August 1994	list
(100240) 1994 PV_{33}	10 August 1994	list
(100241) 1994 PK_{35}	10 August 1994	list
(100242) 1994 PS_{35}	10 August 1994	list
(100243) 1994 PO_{37}	10 August 1994	list
(100248) 1994 RB_{13}	3 September 1994	list
(100250) 1994 RN_{15}	3 September 1994	list
(100251) 1994 RC_{17}	3 September 1994	list
(100252) 1994 RY_{25}	5 September 1994	list
(100369) 1995 UX_{45}	20 October 1995	list
(100424) 1996 GS_{18}	15 April 1996	list
(100427) 1996 HQ_{10}	17 April 1996	list
(100428) 1996 HT_{11}	17 April 1996	list
(100429) 1996 HB_{15}	17 April 1996	list
(100430) 1996 HK_{18}	18 April 1996	list
(100431) 1996 HU_{20}	18 April 1996	list
(100432) 1996 HX_{23}	20 April 1996	list
(100441) 1996 PZ_{7}	8 August 1996	list
(100477) 1996 TM_{39}	8 October 1996	list
(100478) 1996 TW_{59}	3 October 1996	list
(100479) 1996 TT_{60}	3 October 1996	list
(100585) 1997 LN_{9}	7 June 1997	list
(100586) 1997 LP_{15}	8 June 1997	list
(100751) 1998 EQ_{13}	1 March 1998	list
(100752) 1998 EF_{20}	3 March 1998	list
(100883) 1998 HY_{101}	25 April 1998	list
(100884) 1998 HB_{102}	25 April 1998	list
(100923) 1998 LU_{1}	1 June 1998	list
100924 Luctuymans	1 June 1998	list
(100925) 1998 LV_{3}	1 June 1998	list
100934 Marthanussbaum	28 June 1998	list
100936 Mekong	26 June 1998	list
(100937) 1998 MH_{43}	26 June 1998	list
(100938) 1998 MC_{44}	26 June 1998	list
100940 Maunder	28 June 1998	list
(100941) 1998 MD_{48}	28 June 1998	list
(100944) 1998 OT_{7}	26 July 1998	list
(100945) 1998 OE_{8}	26 July 1998	list
(100946) 1998 OD_{10}	26 July 1998	list
(100947) 1998 OS_{12}	26 July 1998	list
(100948) 1998 OF_{13}	26 July 1998	list
(100949) 1998 OJ_{14}	26 July 1998	list
(101042) 1998 QN_{99}	26 August 1998	list
(101043) 1998 QP_{99}	26 August 1998	list
(101044) 1998 QU_{99}	26 August 1998	list
(101045) 1998 QN_{100}	26 August 1998	list
(101046) 1998 QQ_{100}	26 August 1998	list
(101047) 1998 QU_{100}	26 August 1998	list
(101048) 1998 QM_{101}	26 August 1998	list
(101049) 1998 QD_{105}	25 August 1998	list
(101050) 1998 QM_{105}	25 August 1998	list
(101051) 1998 QK_{106}	25 August 1998	list
(101224) 1998 ST_{64}	20 September 1998	list
(101225) 1998 SO_{65}	20 September 1998	list
(101226) 1998 SY_{66}	20 September 1998	list
(101229) 1998 SJ_{71}	21 September 1998	list
(101230) 1998 SV_{72}	21 September 1998	list
(101231) 1998 SZ_{74}	21 September 1998	list
(101315) 1998 SL_{143}	18 September 1998	list
(101316) 1998 SS_{145}	20 September 1998	list
(101330) 1998 SS_{163}	18 September 1998	list
101331 Sjöström	18 September 1998	list
(101386) 1998 UW_{26}	18 October 1998	list
113256 Prüm	13 September 2002	list
(118171) 1988 DT_{1}	16 February 1988	list
(118189) 1994 PB_{12}	10 August 1994	list
(118190) 1994 PT_{12}	10 August 1994	list
(118191) 1994 PE_{14}	10 August 1994	list
(118218) 1996 GM_{17}	15 April 1996	list
(118219) 1996 HT_{20}	18 April 1996	list
(118220) 1996 HA_{21}	18 April 1996	list
(118221) 1996 HQ_{21}	18 April 1996	list
(118227) 1996 TR_{39}	8 October 1996	list
(118241) 1997 LJ_{9}	7 June 1997	list
(118255) 1998 CZ_{2}	6 February 1998	list
(118271) 1998 HO_{149}	25 April 1998	list
(118273) 1998 OX_{9}	26 July 1998	list
(118277) 1998 QE_{105}	25 August 1998	list
(118305) 1998 UU_{30}	18 October 1998	list
(120455) 1989 GF_{2}	3 April 1989	list
(120458) 1990 SN_{5}	22 September 1990	list
(120459) 1990 SQ_{6}	22 September 1990	list
(120463) 1991 GQ_{4}	8 April 1991	list
(120464) 1991 PV_{5}	6 August 1991	list
(120477) 1992 OT_{6}	30 July 1992	list
(120479) 1992 RO_{4}	2 September 1992	list
(120480) 1992 RS_{7}	2 September 1992	list
(120501) 1993 PA_{8}	15 August 1993	list
(120502) 1993 QD_{9}	20 August 1993	list
(120504) 1993 SS_{10}	22 September 1993	list^{[E]}
(120505) 1993 ST_{10}	22 September 1993	list^{[E]}
(120507) 1993 TK_{14}	9 October 1993	list
(120508) 1993 TC_{16}	9 October 1993	list
(120509) 1993 TJ_{16}	9 October 1993	list
(120510) 1993 TU_{16}	9 October 1993	list
(120511) 1993 TA_{20}	9 October 1993	list
(120512) 1993 TW_{20}	9 October 1993	list
(120513) 1993 TJ_{25}	9 October 1993	list
(120514) 1993 TY_{26}	9 October 1993	list
(120515) 1993 TX_{31}	9 October 1993	list
(120516) 1993 TY_{33}	9 October 1993	list
(120517) 1993 UU_{8}	20 October 1993	list
(120521) 1994 CY_{11}	7 February 1994	list
(120522) 1994 NU_{2}	11 July 1994	list^{[E]}
(120523) 1994 PR_{4}	10 August 1994	list
(120524) 1994 PW_{4}	10 August 1994	list
(120525) 1994 PV_{6}	10 August 1994	list
(120526) 1994 PB_{7}	10 August 1994	list
(120527) 1994 PZ_{7}	10 August 1994	list
(120528) 1994 PD_{12}	10 August 1994	list
(120529) 1994 PH_{20}	12 August 1994	list
(120530) 1994 PJ_{21}	12 August 1994	list
(120531) 1994 PV_{26}	12 August 1994	list
(120532) 1994 PX_{38}	10 August 1994	list
(120533) 1994 PM_{39}	10 August 1994	list
(120628) 1996 FO_{21}	24 March 1996	list
(120635) 1996 HE_{16}	18 April 1996	list
(120636) 1996 HW_{17}	18 April 1996	list
(120695) 1997 GU_{40}	7 April 1997	list
(120703) 1997 JM_{13}	3 May 1997	list
(120705) 1997 LH_{14}	8 June 1997	list
(120778) 1998 DQ_{34}	27 February 1998	list
(120780) 1998 EY_{10}	1 March 1998	list
(120781) 1998 EL_{11}	1 March 1998	list
(120782) 1998 EM_{12}	1 March 1998	list
(120783) 1998 EN_{19}	3 March 1998	list
(120784) 1998 EY_{20}	3 March 1998	list
(120850) 1998 OO_{8}	26 July 1998	list
(120864) 1998 QK_{99}	26 August 1998	list
(120865) 1998 QN_{106}	25 August 1998	list
(120911) 1998 SP_{65}	20 September 1998	list
(120912) 1998 SP_{75}	21 September 1998	list
(120933) 1998 SL_{147}	20 September 1998	list
(120954) 1998 UD_{25}	18 October 1998	list
(129448) 1989 SX_{1}	26 September 1989	list
(129449) 1990 WE_{1}	18 November 1990	list
(129455) 1992 BR_{2}	30 January 1992	list
(129471) 1993 OL_{8}	20 July 1993	list
(129472) 1993 PS_{5}	15 August 1993	list
(129474) 1993 TF_{16}	9 October 1993	list
(129475) 1993 TK_{16}	9 October 1993	list
(129476) 1993 TN_{20}	9 October 1993	list
(129477) 1993 TB_{26}	9 October 1993	list
(129478) 1993 TU_{27}	9 October 1993	list
(129479) 1993 TO_{41}	9 October 1993	list
(129480) 1993 UQ_{8}	20 October 1993	list
(129481) 1994 CL_{15}	8 February 1994	list
(129484) 1994 PG_{15}	10 August 1994	list
(129485) 1994 PM_{30}	12 August 1994	list
(129486) 1994 PN_{30}	12 August 1994	list
(129487) 1994 RX_{14}	3 September 1994	list
(129554) 1996 TC_{63}	6 October 1996	list
(129647) 1998 LX_{2}	1 June 1998	list
(129667) 1998 QY_{104}	26 August 1998	list
(129706) 1998 SZ_{143}	18 September 1998	list
(129707) 1998 SM_{147}	20 September 1998	list
(129720) 1998 UZ_{30}	18 October 1998	list
(134345) 1990 UN_{5}	16 October 1990	list
134346 Pinatubo	2 August 1991	list
(134347) 1992 RV_{3}	2 September 1992	list
(134351) 1993 RC_{8}	15 September 1993	list
(134353) 1993 TB_{30}	9 October 1993	list
(134354) 1993 UM_{7}	20 October 1993	list
(134356) 1994 PN_{6}	10 August 1994	list
(134357) 1994 PU_{9}	10 August 1994	list
(134358) 1994 PW_{10}	10 August 1994	list
(134359) 1994 PP_{27}	12 August 1994	list
(134360) 1994 PQ_{37}	10 August 1994	list
(134397) 1997 JK_{11}	3 May 1997	list
(134398) 1997 JW_{15}	3 May 1997	list
(134400) 1997 LK_{17}	8 June 1997	list
134419 Hippothous	28 June 1998	list
(134420) 1998 OA_{15}	26 July 1998	list
(134426) 1998 QQ_{105}	25 August 1998	list
(134462) 1998 ST_{163}	18 September 1998	list
(134673) 1999 VM_{211}	14 November 1999	list
(136585) 1992 SG_{19}	22 September 1992	list
(136603) 1993 PR_{4}	15 August 1993	list
(136605) 1993 SC_{8}	17 September 1993	list
(136607) 1993 TW_{19}	9 October 1993	list
(136608) 1993 TF_{25}	9 October 1993	list
(136609) 1993 TY_{30}	9 October 1993	list
(136610) 1993 TK_{31}	9 October 1993	list
(136611) 1993 TB_{32}	9 October 1993	list
(136612) 1993 TW_{37}	9 October 1993	list
(136613) 1993 TA_{38}	9 October 1993	list
(136619) 1994 CH_{18}	8 February 1994	list
(136622) 1994 PC_{6}	10 August 1994	list
(136623) 1994 PS_{6}	10 August 1994	list
(136624) 1994 PD_{14}	10 August 1994	list
(136625) 1994 PW_{15}	10 August 1994	list
(136626) 1994 PX_{18}	12 August 1994	list
(136627) 1994 PM_{19}	12 August 1994	list
(136628) 1994 PL_{21}	12 August 1994	list
(136629) 1994 PB_{29}	12 August 1994	list
(136764) 1996 HM_{23}	20 April 1996	list
(136808) 1997 EN_{47}	12 March 1997	list
(136886) 1998 GL_{12}	2 April 1998	list
(136914) 1998 HA_{103}	25 April 1998	list
(136946) 1998 QY_{99}	26 August 1998	list
(136947) 1998 QS_{100}	26 August 1998	list
(136948) 1998 QO_{106}	25 August 1998	list
(136997) 1998 SP_{72}	21 September 1998	list
(136998) 1998 SG_{75}	21 September 1998	list
(137038) 1998 UA_{26}	18 October 1998	list
142291 Dompfaff	12 September 2002	list
(144887) 2004 RD_{165}	9 September 2004	list^{[J]}
(145710) 1989 SF_{3}	26 September 1989	list
(145711) 1989 TY_{6}	7 October 1989	list
(145712) 1991 BQ_{1}	18 January 1991	list
(145720) 1993 OX_{7}	20 July 1993	list
(145722) 1993 TZ_{46}	11 October 1993	list
(145727) 1994 PL_{29}	12 August 1994	list
(145754) 1996 HF_{26}	20 April 1996	list
(145756) 1996 TZ_{38}	8 October 1996	list
(145786) 1998 OT_{11}	26 July 1998	list
(147954) 1993 RW_{14}	15 September 1993	list
(147958) 1993 TN_{25}	9 October 1993	list
(147959) 1993 TQ_{28}	9 October 1993	list
(147964) 1994 PP_{9}	10 August 1994	list
(147965) 1994 PV_{14}	10 August 1994	list
(147966) 1994 PK_{21}	12 August 1994	list
(147967) 1994 PW_{38}	10 August 1994	list
(148001) 1997 EX_{49}	5 March 1997	list
(148007) 1997 JL_{12}	3 May 1997	list
(148008) 1997 JS_{17}	3 May 1997	list
(148022) 1998 CH_{4}	6 February 1998	list
(148028) 1998 EY_{12}	1 March 1998	list
(148033) 1998 MF_{41}	28 June 1998	list
(148045) 1998 SX_{64}	20 September 1998	list
(148047) 1998 SN_{72}	21 September 1998	list
(148065) 1998 UH_{29}	18 October 1998	list
(149086) 2002 CM_{116}	15 February 2002	list^{[E]}
(150120) 1993 TS_{24}	9 October 1993	list
(150123) 1994 PY_{6}	10 August 1994	list
(150124) 1994 PU_{22}	12 August 1994	list
(150125) 1994 PQ_{29}	12 August 1994	list
(150175) 1998 ED_{11}	1 March 1998	list
(150176) 1998 EL_{20}	3 March 1998	list
(150189) 1998 MV_{38}	26 June 1998	list
(150194) 1998 QB_{100}	26 August 1998	list
(150195) 1998 QT_{100}	26 August 1998	list
150316 Iosifovich	1 November 1999	list^{[G]}
(152571) 1993 QG_{9}	20 August 1993	list
(152572) 1993 TE_{23}	9 October 1993	list
(152573) 1993 TG_{32}	9 October 1993	list
(152574) 1994 CR_{9}	7 February 1994	list
(152576) 1994 NR_{2}	11 July 1994	list^{[E]}
(152577) 1994 PA_{10}	10 August 1994	list
(152578) 1994 PU_{11}	10 August 1994	list
(152579) 1994 PJ_{37}	10 August 1994	list
(152616) 1996 HG_{19}	18 April 1996	list
(152691) 1998 QJ_{103}	26 August 1998	list
(152707) 1998 SM_{71}	21 September 1998	list
(154888) 2004 RC_{165}	9 September 2004	list^{[J]}
(155371) 1990 SB_{8}	22 September 1990	list
(155376) 1992 RL_{5}	2 September 1992	list
(155382) 1993 TZ_{15}	9 October 1993	list
(155383) 1993 TC_{18}	9 October 1993	list
(155384) 1993 TZ_{19}	9 October 1993	list
(155385) 1993 UO_{6}	20 October 1993	list
(155390) 1994 PP_{29}	12 August 1994	list
(155391) 1994 PG_{30}	12 August 1994	list
(155413) 1996 HS_{19}	18 April 1996	list
(155414) 1996 HQ_{24}	20 April 1996	list
(155457) 1998 QK_{103}	26 August 1998	list
(155468) 1998 SM_{65}	20 September 1998	list
(155483) 1998 UC_{27}	18 October 1998	list
(157793) 1994 EZ_{5}	9 March 1994	list
(157794) 1994 PP_{14}	10 August 1994	list
(159369) 1993 UJ_{4}	20 October 1993	list
(159373) 1996 FD_{18}	22 March 1996	list
(159388) 1998 OL_{11}	26 July 1998	list
(160515) 1993 RP_{13}	14 September 1993	list^{[E]}
(160516) 1994 PC_{32}	12 August 1994	list
(160531) 1996 TB_{49}	4 October 1996	list
(160532) 1996 TH_{50}	4 October 1996	list
(160533) 1996 TT_{56}	2 October 1996	list
(160534) 1996 TA_{58}	2 October 1996	list
(160535) 1996 TC_{64}	6 October 1996	list
(160562) 1998 SO_{74}	21 September 1998	list
(162009) 1993 TE_{19}	9 October 1993	list
(162010) 1993 UN_{6}	20 October 1993	list
(162012) 1994 PY_{16}	10 August 1994	list
(162013) 1994 PC_{17}	10 August 1994	list
(162040) 1996 KF_{4}	22 May 1996	list
(162041) 1996 NL_{4}	14 July 1996	list
(162043) 1996 PP_{7}	8 August 1996	list
(162054) 1996 TF_{42}	8 October 1996	list
(162089) 1998 OL_{13}	26 July 1998	list
(162140) 1998 UX_{28}	18 October 1998	list
(164620) 1992 RA_{3}	2 September 1992	list
(164625) 1993 TC_{15}	9 October 1993	list
(164626) 1993 TL_{41}	9 October 1993	list
(164627) 1993 UT_{7}	20 October 1993	list
(164628) 1993 UX_{7}	20 October 1993	list
(164630) 1994 PO_{6}	10 August 1994	list
(164632) 1994 RM_{14}	3 September 1994	list
(164668) 1996 TP_{56}	2 October 1996	list
(164685) 1997 LH_{13}	7 June 1997	list
(168320) 1990 WG_{5}	16 November 1990	list
(168328) 1993 NX_{1}	12 July 1993	list
(168332) 1993 TC_{28}	9 October 1993	list
(168333) 1994 CU_{17}	8 February 1994	list
(168335) 1994 PW_{24}	12 August 1994	list
(168336) 1994 PV_{28}	12 August 1994	list
(168366) 1996 TC_{42}	8 October 1996	list
(168401) 1998 EF_{11}	1 March 1998	list
(168424) 1998 QG_{104}	26 August 1998	list
(171476) 1993 RT_{4}	15 September 1993	list
(173127) 1994 CQ_{10}	7 February 1994	list
(173131) 1994 PY_{36}	10 August 1994	list
(173159) 1996 TS_{39}	8 October 1996	list
(173172) 1997 EN_{58}	10 March 1997	list
(175667) 1993 TX_{24}	9 October 1993	list
(175670) 1994 PN_{32}	12 August 1994	list
(175742) 1998 MF_{47}	28 June 1998	list
(178289) 1989 TH_{3}	7 October 1989	list
(178290) 1989 TD_{4}	7 October 1989	list
(178301) 1993 QW_{3}	18 August 1993	list
(178303) 1993 TB_{27}	9 October 1993	list
(178306) 1994 PT_{25}	12 August 1994	list
(178307) 1994 PS_{29}	12 August 1994	list
(178308) 1994 PP_{32}	12 August 1994	list
(178400) 1998 OA_{11}	26 July 1998	list
(178429) 1998 SL_{164}	18 September 1998	list
(178435) 1998 UD_{30}	18 October 1998	list
181702 Forcalquier	15 September 1988	list
(181705) 1989 RY	3 September 1989	list
(181710) 1993 SO_{8}	17 September 1993	list
(181711) 1993 SC_{9}	22 September 1993	list^{[E]}
(181712) 1993 TQ_{16}	9 October 1993	list
(181713) 1993 TL_{27}	9 October 1993	list
(181714) 1993 TM_{27}	9 October 1993	list
(181715) 1993 TO_{34}	9 October 1993	list
181751 Phaenops	17 April 1996	list
(181759) 1996 TX_{50}	4 October 1996	list
(181770) 1997 EF_{57}	10 March 1997	list
(181774) 1997 LK_{10}	7 June 1997	list
(181798) 1998 MJ_{40}	26 June 1998	list
(181808) 1998 QY_{106}	25 August 1998	list
(185660) 1993 RE_{4}	15 September 1993	list
(185661) 1993 TY_{23}	9 October 1993	list
(185704) 1998 OD_{8}	26 July 1998	list
(185718) 1998 SY_{64}	20 September 1998	list
(185729) 1998 UN_{25}	18 October 1998	list
(187755) 1996 HN_{17}	18 April 1996	list
(187777) 1998 SZ_{70}	21 September 1998	list
(189408) 1989 CA_{3}	4 February 1989	list
(189411) 1993 TZ_{26}	9 October 1993	list
(189412) 1993 TZ_{43}	10 October 1993	list^{[E]}
(189413) 1994 PA_{16}	10 August 1994	list
(189435) 1998 QH_{104}	26 August 1998	list
(190288) 1994 PG_{12}	10 August 1994	list
(190289) 1994 PR_{15}	10 August 1994	list
(190324) 1998 OC_{13}	26 July 1998	list
(192307) 1993 RM_{16}	15 September 1993	list^{[E]}
(192309) 1993 TK_{26}	9 October 1993	list
(192310) 1993 TN_{26}	9 October 1993	list
(192311) 1993 TS_{29}	9 October 1993	list
(192317) 1994 PO_{26}	12 August 1994	list
(192318) 1994 RH_{16}	3 September 1994	list
(192319) 1994 RY_{24}	5 September 1994	list
(192320) 1994 RA_{28}	5 September 1994	list
(192414) 1997 LG_{17}	8 June 1997	list
(192508) 1998 OP_{13}	26 July 1998	list
(192513) 1998 QZ_{103}	26 August 1998	list
(192532) 1998 SZ_{63}	20 September 1998	list
(192542) 1998 SO_{144}	20 September 1998	list
(192543) 1998 SD_{146}	20 September 1998	list
(195090) 2002 CL_{116}	15 February 2002	list^{[E]}
(200090) 1993 TH_{36}	11 October 1993	list
(200093) 1994 RJ_{26}	5 September 1994	list
(200150) 1998 LW_{3}	1 June 1998	list
(202893) 1993 TH_{39}	9 October 1993	list
(204965) 1989 SY_{4}	26 September 1989	list
(204972) 1993 QV_{8}	20 August 1993	list
(204973) 1993 SN_{9}	22 September 1993	list^{[E]}
(204975) 1993 TW_{35}	11 October 1993	list
(205012) 1997 LX_{10}	7 June 1997	list
(207953) 1994 PQ_{18}	12 August 1994	list
(207954) 1994 RU_{21}	5 September 1994	list
(207991) 1998 EJ_{14}	1 March 1998	list
(208002) 1998 MT_{43}	26 June 1998	list
(208003) 1998 OJ_{11}	26 July 1998	list
(208004) 1998 OO_{13}	26 July 1998	list
(208070) 1999 VT_{72}	10 November 1999	list
(210459) 1993 TC_{26}	9 October 1993	list
(210525) 1998 UP_{26}	18 October 1998	list
(213044) 1998 OG_{10}	26 July 1998	list
(213047) 1998 SJ_{75}	21 September 1998	list
(215116) 1998 MG_{44}	26 June 1998	list
(216929) 1998 QR_{99}	26 August 1998	list
(217631) 1993 TG_{15}	9 October 1993	list
(217632) 1993 TA_{25}	9 October 1993	list
(217647) 1998 OR_{11}	26 July 1998	list
(217673) 1998 UP_{30}	18 October 1998	list
(219023) 1993 RP_{14}	15 September 1993	list
(219024) 1993 TK_{20}	9 October 1993	list
(219025) 1993 TV_{30}	9 October 1993	list
(219061) 1996 TL_{53}	5 October 1996	list
219067 Bossuet	3 May 1997	list
(219081) 1998 OT_{9}	26 July 1998	list
(219088) 1998 QV_{103}	26 August 1998	list
(219109) 1998 SQ_{67}	20 September 1998	list
(219110) 1998 SV_{70}	21 September 1998	list
(219111) 1998 SP_{73}	21 September 1998	list
(221949) 1993 SJ_{9}	22 September 1993	list^{[E]}
(221950) 1993 TF_{15}	9 October 1993	list
(221951) 1993 TZ_{33}	9 October 1993	list
(221952) 1994 PU_{15}	10 August 1994	list
(221999) 1998 EE_{18}	3 March 1998	list
(222023) 1998 SV_{63}	20 September 1998	list
(222044) 1998 UR_{30}	18 October 1998	list
(225282) 1993 RS_{7}	15 September 1993	list
(225286) 1994 PD_{5}	10 August 1994	list
(225288) 1994 RT_{17}	3 September 1994	list
(225309) 1996 HV_{14}	17 April 1996	list
(225316) 1997 LQ_{16}	8 June 1997	list
(228231) 1998 QT_{101}	26 August 1998	list
(231670) 1993 UN_{5}	20 October 1993	list
(231674) 1994 PG_{6}	10 August 1994	list
(231693) 1998 DR_{33}	27 February 1998	list
(234013) 1997 LR_{16}	8 June 1997	list
235852 Theogeuens	14 January 2005	list^{[F]}
(237364) 1993 TW_{22}	9 October 1993	list
(237366) 1994 PJ_{14}	10 August 1994	list
(237367) 1994 PY_{35}	10 August 1994	list
(237408) 1998 SA_{72}	21 September 1998	list
(239799) 1993 OU_{9}	20 July 1993	list
(239801) 1994 CA_{11}	7 February 1994	list
(239826) 1998 UZ_{25}	18 October 1998	list
(241481) 2009 BM_{83}	31 January 2009	list^{[F]}
(241567) 1993 OJ_{9}	20 July 1993	list
(241568) 1993 RN_{14}	15 September 1993	list
(243558) 1993 TJ_{28}	9 October 1993	list
(243559) 1993 TR_{37}	9 October 1993	list
(243560) 1994 PO_{5}	10 August 1994	list
(246870) 1993 RX_{14}	15 September 1993	list
(246871) 1993 TL_{14}	9 October 1993	list
(246872) 1993 TK_{23}	9 October 1993	list
(246873) 1994 PQ_{7}	10 August 1994	list
(246918) 1998 UN_{27}	18 October 1998	list
(249569) 1989 SL_{3}	26 September 1989	list
(249571) 1993 TM_{30}	9 October 1993	list
(249572) 1994 RR_{18}	3 September 1994	list
(251656) 1993 UW_{7}	20 October 1993	list
(257465) 1993 OE_{6}	20 July 1993	list
(257467) 1993 TU_{41}	9 October 1993	list
257533 Iquique	6 February 1998	list
(263849) 2009 BL_{83}	31 January 2009	list^{[F]}
(264262) 1994 PF_{4}	10 August 1994	list
(264287) 1998 QT_{99}	26 August 1998	list
(266974) 2010 VK_{133}	9 October 1993	list
(267005) 1992 RN_{5}	2 September 1992	list
(267011) 1994 PQ_{26}	12 August 1994	list
(267012) 1994 RM_{26}	3 September 1994	list
(267030) 1996 TV_{40}	8 October 1996	list
(267031) 1996 TZ_{50}	5 October 1996	list
(267032) 1996 TC_{60}	3 October 1996	list
(269652) 1994 PE_{31}	12 August 1994	list
(279726) 1993 TG_{30}	9 October 1993	list
(279748) 1998 QH_{100}	26 August 1998	list
(281913) 2011 EZ_{53}	9 October 1993	list
(282029) 1993 OH_{3}	20 July 1993	list
(283275) 2011 HE_{29}	13 July 1993	list
(285089) 1993 TT_{23}	9 October 1993	list
(285090) 1993 TV_{24}	9 October 1993	list
(285094) 1994 PR_{7}	10 August 1994	list
(285186) 1996 TK_{39}	8 October 1996	list
(297239) 1994 RH_{19}	5 September 1994	list
(297310) 1998 UK_{28}	18 October 1998	list
(301848) 1994 PQ_{3}	10 August 1994	list
(302534) 2002 LQ_{64}	11 August 1994	list
(306377) 1990 WK_{1}	18 November 1990	list
(306378) 1992 RU_{5}	2 September 1992	list
(306382) 1993 SL_{9}	22 September 1993	list^{[E]}
(306389) 1994 PO_{3}	10 August 1994	list
(306426) 1998 QR_{104}	26 August 1998	list
(306432) 1998 SD_{74}	21 September 1998	list
(310377) 1993 UK_{5}	20 October 1993	list
(312877) 2011 UY_{179}	15 September 1993	list^{[E]}
(312937) 1993 RU_{14}	15 September 1993	list
314082 Dryope	6 February 2005	list^{[E]}
(316549) 2010 XD_{78}	9 October 1993	list
(316654) 1993 NF_{1}	12 July 1993	list
(316657) 1993 TQ_{22}	9 October 1993	list
(316658) 1993 TC_{46}	10 October 1993	list
321357 Mirzakhani	3 September 1994	list
(322097) 2010 VR_{137}	9 October 1993	list
(322169) 2010 XT_{18}	11 July 1994	list^{[E]}
(322209) 2011 AS_{25}	5 September 1994	list
322574 Werckmeister	24 August 1990	list
(322613) 1994 PV_{2}	10 August 1994	list
(322631) 1998 QA_{103}	26 August 1998	list
(330056) 2005 UC_{423}	28 October 2005	list^{[E]}
(331474) 1994 PO_{14}	10 August 1994	list
(333844) 1990 WQ	18 November 1990	list
(336794) 2011 CL_{71}	10 August 1994	list
(337010) 1993 TE_{17}	9 October 1993	list
(337013) 1994 PY_{5}	10 August 1994	list
337044 Bobdylan	16 February 1996	list
337166 Ivanartioukhov	1 November 1999	list^{[G]}
(343660) 2010 LW_{113}	27 January 1993	list
(344057) 1993 QP_{8}	20 August 1993	list
(344058) 1994 PS_{22}	12 August 1994	list
346886 Middelburg	15 November 1999	list
(350443) 1993 TA_{26}	9 October 1993	list
(353383) 2011 MO_{7}	3 September 1994	list
(353433) 2011 QX_{56}	10 August 1994	list
(353823) 2012 TC_{319}	10 August 1994	list
(360131) 2013 CK_{35}	16 February 1996	list
(360138) 2013 CP_{38}	10 October 1993	list
(360206) 1998 SF_{146}	20 September 1998	list
(363013) 1993 TH_{17}	9 October 1993	list
(363029) 1998 UW_{25}	18 October 1998	list
(365350) 2009 SK_{279}	17 April 1996	list
(365762) 2010 XZ_{8}	16 August 1993	list
(366342) 1993 TV_{29}	9 October 1993	list
(369957) 1993 TX_{35}	11 October 1993	list
(369958) 1993 TV_{45}	9 October 1993	list
(375701) 2009 PY_{3}	5 September 1994	list
(376579) 2013 PO_{17}	12 August 1994	list
(381444) 2008 QV_{32}	30 August 2008	list^{[F]}
(382417) 1998 OF_{9}	26 July 1998	list
(390532) 1998 QO_{102}	26 August 1998	list
(393351) 1993 TR_{26}	9 October 1993	list
(404946) 1993 TO_{26}	9 October 1993	list
(415691) 1993 SM_{6}	17 September 1993	list
(437833) 1994 PP_{13}	10 August 1994	list
(439836) 1996 TX_{51}	5 October 1996	list
(447464) 2006 NU	1 July 2006	list^{[E]}
(452299) 1993 TX_{47}	12 October 1993	list
(469277) 1993 TC_{17}	9 October 1993	list
(474122) 1994 RP_{24}	5 September 1994	list
(483400) 1997 LY_{13}	8 June 1997	list
Co-discovery made with:^{A} V. G. Ivanova^{B} G. Pizarro^{C} V. G. Shkodrov^{D} C. Pollas^{E} H. Debehogne^{F} T. Pauwels^{G} S. I. Ipatov^{H} D. Taeymans^{J} P. De Cat

== Personal life and death ==
Elst was born in Kapellen on 30 November 1936. He died in Antwerp on 2 January 2022, at the age of 85.

== See also ==
- List of minor planet discoverers
