= Freilich =

Freilich may refer to: The surname “Freilich” originates from the Yiddish word freylekh (פֿריילעך), meaning “happy” or “cheerful.” In Southern German dialects, the term “freilich” is also used to mean “of course” or “certainly,” reflecting an additional linguistic layer to the name's interpretation.

== People ==
- Alicia Freilich (born 1939), Venezuelan writer
- Edith Freilich (1911–2011), American bridge player
- Eitan Freilich (born 1993), British singer
- Hadassah Lieberman (born 1948, as Hadassah Freilich), American lobbyist and campaigner, wife of politician Joe Lieberman
- Janet Freilich (born 1987), namesake of the asteroid 20593 Freilich
- Michael Freilich (politician) (born 1980), Belgian journalist and politician
- Michael Freilich (oceanographer) (1954–2020), American director of NASA's Earth science program
- Yuval Freilich (born 1995), Israeli épée fencer

== Other uses ==
- 20593 Freilich, an asteroid
- Sentinel-6 Michael Freilich, an oceanographic satellite

== See also ==
- Michael Freilich (disambiguation)
