= Michael Freilich =

Michael Freilich may refer to:

- Michael Freilich (politician) (born 1980), Belgian journalist and politician
- Michael Freilich (oceanographer) (1954–2020), director of NASA's Earth science program
- Sentinel-6 Michael Freilich (launched 2020), an oceanographic satellite
