= List of minor planets: 20001–21000 =

The following is a partial list of minor planets, running from minor-planet number 20001 through 21000, inclusive. The primary data for this and other partial lists is based on JPL's "Small-Body Orbital Elements" and data available from the Minor Planet Center. Critical list information is also provided by the MPC, unless otherwise specified from Lowell Observatory. A detailed description of the table's columns and additional sources are given on the main page including a complete list of every page in this series, and a statistical break-up on the dynamical classification of minor planets.

Also see the summary list of all named bodies in numerical and alphabetical order, and the corresponding naming citations for the number range of this particular list. New namings may only be added to this list after official publication, as the preannouncement of names is condemned by the Working Group for Small Bodies Nomenclature of the International Astronomical Union.

Near-Earth obj.	MBA (inner)	MBA (outer)	Centaur
Mars-crosser	MBA (middle)	Jupiter trojan	Trans-Neptunian obj.
Unclassified

== 20001–20100 ==
Designation			Discovery			Properties		Ref
Permanent	Provisional	Named after	Date	Site	Discoverer(s)	Category	Diam.	Ref
20001 Marinakoren	1991 CM	Marinakoren	February 5, 1991	Yorii	M. Arai, H. Mori	·	23 km	MPC; JPL
20002 Tillysmith	1991 EM	Tillysmith	March 10, 1991	Siding Spring	R. H. McNaught	·	12 km	MPC; JPL
20003 Andorfer	1991 EX_{2}	Andorfer	March 11, 1991	La Silla	H. Debehogne	·	3.3 km	MPC; JPL
20004 Audrey-Lucienne	1991 GS_{6}	Audrey-Lucienne	April 8, 1991	La Silla	E. W. Elst	·	3.8 km	MPC; JPL
20005 Zagarella	1991 GL_{7}	Zagarella	April 8, 1991	La Silla	E. W. Elst	·	2.3 km	MPC; JPL
20006 Albertus Magnus	1991 GH_{11}	Albertus Magnus	April 11, 1991	Tautenburg Observatory	F. Börngen	·	9.1 km	MPC; JPL
20007 Marybrown	1991 LR	Marybrown	June 7, 1991	Palomar	C. S. Shoemaker, E. M. Shoemaker	PHO	7.1 km	MPC; JPL
20008 Adacarrera	1991 NG_{3}	Adacarrera	July 4, 1991	La Silla	H. Debehogne	EUN · slow	5.6 km	MPC; JPL
20009 Joerao	1991 OY	Joerao	July 18, 1991	Palomar	H. E. Holt	RAF	3.6 km	MPC; JPL
20010 Tomfrench	1991 PN_{2}	Tomfrench	August 2, 1991	La Silla	E. W. Elst	·	3.8 km	MPC; JPL
20011 Baryshnikov	1991 PD_{13}	Baryshnikov	August 5, 1991	Palomar	H. E. Holt	·	3.2 km	MPC; JPL
20012 Ranke	1991 RV_{4}	Ranke	September 13, 1991	Tautenburg Observatory	F. Börngen, L. D. Schmadel	·	3.0 km	MPC; JPL
20013 Nureyev	1991 RT_{26}	Nureyev	September 11, 1991	Palomar	H. E. Holt	EUN · slow	5.0 km	MPC; JPL
20014 Annalisa	1991 RM_{29}	Annalisa	September 13, 1991	Palomar	H. E. Holt	·	4.4 km	MPC; JPL
20015 Liguori	1991 SR	Liguori	September 30, 1991	Siding Spring	R. H. McNaught	MAR	4.4 km	MPC; JPL
20016 Rietschel	1991 TU_{13}	Rietschel	October 8, 1991	Tautenburg Observatory	F. Börngen	·	3.4 km	MPC; JPL
20017 Alixcatherine	1991 TF_{14}	Alixcatherine	October 2, 1991	Palomar	C. P. de Saint-Aignan	·	3.3 km	MPC; JPL
20018 Paulgray	1991 UJ_{2}	Paulgray	October 29, 1991	Kushiro	S. Ueda, H. Kaneda	·	4.4 km	MPC; JPL
20019 Yukiotanaka	1991 VN	Yukiotanaka	November 2, 1991	Kitami	A. Takahashi, K. Watanabe	·	3.3 km	MPC; JPL
20020 Mipach	1991 VT	Mipach	November 4, 1991	Kani	Y. Mizuno, T. Furuta	·	6.4 km	MPC; JPL
20021 Kevinkell	1991 VM_{6}	Kevinkell	November 6, 1991	La Silla	E. W. Elst	MAR	5.6 km	MPC; JPL
20022 Dontown	1991 VO_{7}	Dontown	November 3, 1991	Kitt Peak	Spacewatch	·	2.3 km	MPC; JPL
20023 Jackmegas	1992 AR	Jackmegas	January 9, 1992	Palomar	E. F. Helin	·	7.2 km	MPC; JPL
20024 Mayrémartínez	1992 BT_{2}	Mayrémartínez	January 30, 1992	La Silla	E. W. Elst	EUN	7.7 km	MPC; JPL
20025 Petronaviera	1992 DU_{7}	Petronaviera	February 29, 1992	La Silla	UESAC	KOR	5.5 km	MPC; JPL
20026 Bettyrobinson	1992 EP_{11}	Bettyrobinson	March 6, 1992	La Silla	UESAC	KOR	5.0 km	MPC; JPL
20027 Michaelwatson	1992 EY_{14}	Michaelwatson	March 1, 1992	La Silla	UESAC	·	7.7 km	MPC; JPL
20028 Stansammy	1992 EZ_{21}	Stansammy	March 1, 1992	La Silla	UESAC	slow	7.4 km	MPC; JPL
20029 Dorner	1992 EB_{24}	Dorner	March 2, 1992	La Silla	UESAC	KOR	3.4 km	MPC; JPL
20030 Bawtenheimer	1992 EN_{30}	Bawtenheimer	March 1, 1992	La Silla	UESAC	·	2.4 km	MPC; JPL
20031 Lakehead	1992 OO	Lakehead	July 27, 1992	Palomar	E. F. Helin	PHO	4.6 km	MPC; JPL
20032 McNish	1992 PU	McNish	August 8, 1992	Caussols	E. W. Elst	·	2.8 km	MPC; JPL
20033 Michaelnoble	1992 PR_{1}	Michaelnoble	August 8, 1992	Caussols	E. W. Elst	·	3.7 km	MPC; JPL
20034 Greenhalgh	1992 PK_{2}	Greenhalgh	August 2, 1992	Palomar	H. E. Holt	·	10 km	MPC; JPL
20035 Lauriroche	1992 SA_{4}	Lauriroche	September 24, 1992	Kitt Peak	Spacewatch	·	2.7 km	MPC; JPL
20036 Marcboucher	1992 UW_{1}	Marcboucher	October 21, 1992	Kani	Y. Mizuno, T. Furuta	NYS	10 km	MPC; JPL
20037 Duke	1992 UW_{4}	Duke	October 20, 1992	Palomar	C. S. Shoemaker, E. M. Shoemaker	H	1.8 km	MPC; JPL
20038 Arasaki	1992 UN_{5}	Arasaki	October 26, 1992	Kitami	K. Endate, K. Watanabe	T_{j} (2.9) · 3:2	24 km	MPC; JPL
20039 Danfalk	1992 WJ	Danfalk	November 16, 1992	Kushiro	S. Ueda, H. Kaneda	NYS	4.9 km	MPC; JPL
20040 Tatsuyamatsuyama	1992 WT_{3}	Tatsuyamatsuyama	November 21, 1992	Geisei	T. Seki	·	3.6 km	MPC; JPL
20041 Gainor	1992 YH	Gainor	December 18, 1992	Yakiimo	Natori, A., T. Urata	·	5.2 km	MPC; JPL
20042 Mortillaro	1993 CK_{1}	Mortillaro	February 15, 1993	Yatsugatake	Y. Kushida, O. Muramatsu	·	9.4 km	MPC; JPL
20043 Ellenmacarthur	1993 EM	Ellenmacarthur	March 2, 1993	Siding Spring	R. H. McNaught	H	1.6 km	MPC; JPL
20044 Vitoux	1993 FV_{1}	Vitoux	March 23, 1993	Caussols	E. W. Elst	EUN	4.9 km	MPC; JPL
20045 Semeniuk	1993 FV_{11}	Semeniuk	March 17, 1993	La Silla	UESAC	·	4.1 km	MPC; JPL
20046 Seronik	1993 FE_{15}	Seronik	March 17, 1993	La Silla	UESAC	·	5.4 km	MPC; JPL
20047 Davidsuzuki	1993 FD_{18}	Davidsuzuki	March 17, 1993	La Silla	UESAC	·	4.7 km	MPC; JPL
20048 Alfianello	1993 FF_{19}	Alfianello	March 17, 1993	La Silla	UESAC	·	6.4 km	MPC; JPL
20049 Antoniopresti	1993 FZ_{20}	Antoniopresti	March 21, 1993	La Silla	UESAC	MIS	4.0 km	MPC; JPL
20050 Aglaonice	1993 FO_{21}	Aglaonice	March 21, 1993	La Silla	UESAC	PAD · slow	6.1 km	MPC; JPL
20051 Phanostrate	1993 FE_{26}	Phanostrate	March 21, 1993	La Silla	UESAC	·	5.9 km	MPC; JPL
20052 Kellman	1993 FS_{27}	Kellman	March 21, 1993	La Silla	UESAC	·	4.7 km	MPC; JPL
20053 Cavefish	1993 FK_{29}	Cavefish	March 21, 1993	La Silla	UESAC	MAR	3.4 km	MPC; JPL
20054 Lágrimaríos	1993 FX_{37}	Lágrimaríos	March 19, 1993	La Silla	UESAC	·	4.3 km	MPC; JPL
20055 Maríaespínola	1993 FB_{47}	Maríaespínola	March 19, 1993	La Silla	UESAC	·	4.0 km	MPC; JPL
20056 Roccati	1993 FU_{64}	Roccati	March 21, 1993	La Silla	UESAC	·	7.0 km	MPC; JPL
20057 Fabiorubeo	1993 GC	Fabiorubeo	April 13, 1993	Kiyosato	S. Otomo	EUN	7.4 km	MPC; JPL
20058 Bundalian	1993 OM_{8}	Bundalian	July 20, 1993	La Silla	E. W. Elst	·	12 km	MPC; JPL
20059 Debswoboda	1993 OY_{9}	Debswoboda	July 20, 1993	La Silla	E. W. Elst	EOS	7.6 km	MPC; JPL
20060 Johannforster	1993 PV_{5}	Johannforster	August 15, 1993	Caussols	E. W. Elst	EOS	8.8 km	MPC; JPL
20061 Bilitza	1993 QS_{1}	Bilitza	August 16, 1993	Caussols	E. W. Elst	·	2.7 km	MPC; JPL
20062 Matthewgriffin	1993 QB_{3}	Matthewgriffin	August 20, 1993	Palomar	E. F. Helin	·	3.8 km	MPC; JPL
20063 Kanakoseki	1993 RC_{4}	Kanakoseki	September 15, 1993	La Silla	E. W. Elst	HYG	11 km	MPC; JPL
20064 Prahladagrawal	1993 RV_{4}	Prahladagrawal	September 15, 1993	La Silla	E. W. Elst	·	2.1 km	MPC; JPL
20065 Kminek	1993 RK_{5}	Kminek	September 15, 1993	La Silla	E. W. Elst	·	1.9 km	MPC; JPL
20066 Sagov	1993 TM_{4}	Sagov	October 8, 1993	Kitt Peak	Spacewatch	·	8.2 km	MPC; JPL
20067 Marthanieves	1993 TN_{24}	Marthanieves	October 9, 1993	La Silla	E. W. Elst	THM	11 km	MPC; JPL
20068 Peterbarthel	1993 TE_{34}	Peterbarthel	October 9, 1993	La Silla	E. W. Elst	·	2.6 km	MPC; JPL
20069 Monyer	1993 TD_{37}	Monyer	October 9, 1993	La Silla	E. W. Elst	·	7.6 km	MPC; JPL
20070 Koichiyuko	1993 XL	Koichiyuko	December 8, 1993	Oizumi	T. Kobayashi	·	3.5 km	MPC; JPL
20071 Viareggio	1994 AG	Viareggio	January 2, 1994	Oizumi	T. Kobayashi	·	2.4 km	MPC; JPL
20072	1994 AG_{1}	—	January 7, 1994	Oizumi	T. Kobayashi	ERI · slow	5.4 km	MPC; JPL
20073 Yumiko	1994 AN_{2}	Yumiko	January 9, 1994	Oizumi	T. Kobayashi, Fujii, H.	V	2.2 km	MPC; JPL
20074 Laskerschueler	1994 AF_{16}	Laskerschueler	January 14, 1994	Tautenburg Observatory	F. Börngen	V	2.3 km	MPC; JPL
20075	1994 BX	—	January 19, 1994	Oizumi	T. Kobayashi	·	2.8 km	MPC; JPL
20076	1994 BH_{1}	—	January 23, 1994	Oizumi	T. Kobayashi	·	4.3 km	MPC; JPL
20077 Borispodolsky	1994 CX_{9}	Borispodolsky	February 7, 1994	La Silla	E. W. Elst	·	3.1 km	MPC; JPL
20078 Nathanrosen	1994 CO_{16}	Nathanrosen	February 8, 1994	La Silla	E. W. Elst	V	2.1 km	MPC; JPL
20079	1994 EP	—	March 4, 1994	Oizumi	T. Kobayashi	·	3.8 km	MPC; JPL
20080 Maeharatorakichi	1994 EO_{1}	Maeharatorakichi	March 7, 1994	Kitami	K. Endate, K. Watanabe	·	8.1 km	MPC; JPL
20081 Occhialini	1994 EE_{3}	Occhialini	March 12, 1994	Cima Ekar	V. Goretti, M. Tombelli	·	5.8 km	MPC; JPL
20082 Yannlecun	1994 EG_{7}	Yannlecun	March 9, 1994	Caussols	E. W. Elst	V · slow	2.0 km	MPC; JPL
20083	1994 GE	—	April 3, 1994	Oizumi	T. Kobayashi	V	2.3 km	MPC; JPL
20084 Buckmaster	1994 GU_{9}	Buckmaster	April 6, 1994	Palomar	C. S. Shoemaker, D. H. Levy	PHO	5.1 km	MPC; JPL
20085	1994 LC	—	June 1, 1994	Dynic	A. Sugie	·	4.1 km	MPC; JPL
20086	1994 LW	—	June 12, 1994	Siding Spring	R. H. McNaught	T_{j} (2.77) · AMO +1km	1.6 km	MPC; JPL
20087 Abbiedonaldson	1994 PC_{7}	Abbiedonaldson	August 10, 1994	La Silla	E. W. Elst	GEF	5.5 km	MPC; JPL
20088 Adambattle	1994 PQ_{10}	Adambattle	August 10, 1994	La Silla	E. W. Elst	KOR	5.1 km	MPC; JPL
20089 Áineobrien	1994 PA_{14}	Áineobrien	August 10, 1994	La Silla	E. W. Elst	KOR	3.0 km	MPC; JPL
20090 Albin	1994 PN_{16}	Albin	August 10, 1994	La Silla	E. W. Elst	EUN	4.0 km	MPC; JPL
20091 Alfredoescalante	1994 PK_{20}	Alfredoescalante	August 12, 1994	La Silla	E. W. Elst	KOR	4.8 km	MPC; JPL
20092 Allisonmcgraw	1994 PL_{22}	Allisonmcgraw	August 12, 1994	La Silla	E. W. Elst	KOR	5.0 km	MPC; JPL
20093 Andrewalberini	1994 PN_{22}	Andrewalberini	August 12, 1994	La Silla	E. W. Elst	KOR	5.6 km	MPC; JPL
20094 Andrewcoates	1994 PS_{26}	Andrewcoates	August 12, 1994	La Silla	E. W. Elst	·	6.2 km	MPC; JPL
20095 Andylopezoquendo	1994 PG_{35}	Andylopezoquendo	August 10, 1994	La Silla	E. W. Elst	KOR	4.0 km	MPC; JPL
20096 Shiraishiakihiko	1994 TZ	Shiraishiakihiko	October 2, 1994	Kitami	K. Endate, K. Watanabe	EOS	8.2 km	MPC; JPL
20097	1994 UL_{2}	—	October 31, 1994	Kushiro	S. Ueda, H. Kaneda	URS	20 km	MPC; JPL
20098 Shibatagenji	1994 WC_{2}	Shibatagenji	November 24, 1994	Kitami	K. Endate, K. Watanabe	GEF ·	18 km	MPC; JPL
20099	1994 WB_{3}	—	November 28, 1994	Kushiro	S. Ueda, H. Kaneda	THM	15 km	MPC; JPL
20100	1994 XM	—	December 4, 1994	Oizumi	T. Kobayashi	THM · slow	7.0 km	MPC; JPL

== 20101–20200 ==
back to top

Designation			Discovery			Properties		Ref
Permanent	Provisional	Named after	Date	Site	Discoverer(s)	Category	Diam.	Ref
20101 Robsullivan	1994 XM_{2}	Robsullivan	December 1, 1994	Kitt Peak	Spacewatch	·	19 km	MPC; JPL
20102 Takasago	1995 BP_{15}	Takasago	January 31, 1995	Geisei	T. Seki	TIR	8.1 km	MPC; JPL
20103 de Vico	1995 JK	de Vico	May 6, 1995	Cavezzo	Calanca, R.	·	3.2 km	MPC; JPL
20104	1995 OU	—	July 24, 1995	Nachi-Katsuura	Y. Shimizu, T. Urata	·	3.5 km	MPC; JPL
20105 Linjingming	1995 OS_{1}	Linjingming	July 19, 1995	Xinglong	SCAP	·	4.9 km	MPC; JPL
20106 Morton	1995 QG	Morton	August 20, 1995	NRC-DAO	D. D. Balam	·	3.2 km	MPC; JPL
20107 Nanyotenmondai	1995 QY_{3}	Nanyotenmondai	August 28, 1995	Nanyo	T. Okuni	·	3.3 km	MPC; JPL
20108	1995 QZ_{9}	—	August 29, 1995	Mauna Kea	D. C. Jewitt, J. Chen	plutino	145 km	MPC; JPL
20109 Alicelandis	1995 RJ	Alicelandis	September 12, 1995	McGraw-Hill	J. L. Tonry	·	3.0 km	MPC; JPL
20110	1995 SS_{2}	—	September 20, 1995	Kushiro	S. Ueda, H. Kaneda	EUN	6.5 km	MPC; JPL
20111	1995 SO_{5}	—	September 22, 1995	Siding Spring	R. H. McNaught	EUN	5.0 km	MPC; JPL
20112 Cassia	1995 SD_{31}	Cassia	September 20, 1995	Kitt Peak	Spacewatch	·	3.6 km	MPC; JPL
20113 Uckert	1995 SL_{35}	Uckert	September 22, 1995	Kitt Peak	Spacewatch	HNS	2.9 km	MPC; JPL
20114 Hikage	1995 UQ_{44}	Hikage	October 26, 1995	Nyukasa	M. Hirasawa, S. Suzuki	·	4.7 km	MPC; JPL
20115 Niheihajime	1995 VC_{1}	Niheihajime	November 12, 1995	Nanyo	T. Okuni	·	4.6 km	MPC; JPL
20116	1995 VE_{1}	—	November 15, 1995	Oizumi	T. Kobayashi	·	4.3 km	MPC; JPL
20117 Tannoakira	1995 VN_{1}	Tannoakira	November 15, 1995	Kitami	K. Endate, K. Watanabe	EUN	6.1 km	MPC; JPL
20118	1995 WX	—	November 17, 1995	Oizumi	T. Kobayashi	·	6.1 km	MPC; JPL
20119	1995 WC_{2}	—	November 18, 1995	Oizumi	T. Kobayashi	GEF	3.7 km	MPC; JPL
20120 Ryugatake	1995 WB_{5}	Ryugatake	November 24, 1995	Oizumi	T. Kobayashi	·	4.8 km	MPC; JPL
20121	1995 WT_{7}	—	November 27, 1995	Oizumi	T. Kobayashi	ADE	5.3 km	MPC; JPL
20122	1995 WH_{17}	—	November 28, 1995	Nachi-Katsuura	Y. Shimizu, T. Urata	·	3.7 km	MPC; JPL
20123 Hansamundsen	1995 WD_{32}	Hansamundsen	November 19, 1995	Kitt Peak	Spacewatch	·	4.8 km	MPC; JPL
20124 Marilynfogel	1995 WJ_{36}	Marilynfogel	November 21, 1995	Kitt Peak	Spacewatch	EUN	4.9 km	MPC; JPL
20125	1995 YK	—	December 17, 1995	Oohira	T. Urata	·	6.4 km	MPC; JPL
20126 Sandfordasher	1995 YM_{9}	Sandfordasher	December 18, 1995	Kitt Peak	Spacewatch	·	4.2 km	MPC; JPL
20127 Benning	1995 YV_{22}	Benning	December 19, 1995	Haleakala	NEAT	THM	7.1 km	MPC; JPL
20128 Panconrad	1996 AK	Panconrad	January 7, 1996	Haleakala	AMOS	·	7.8 km	MPC; JPL
20129	1996 BE_{1}	—	January 18, 1996	Oizumi	T. Kobayashi	·	8.4 km	MPC; JPL
20130	1996 BO_{1}	—	January 16, 1996	Oizumi	T. Kobayashi	EOS	7.5 km	MPC; JPL
20131	1996 BP_{3}	—	January 27, 1996	Oizumi	T. Kobayashi	EOS	7.3 km	MPC; JPL
20132 Huangwei	1996 BK_{13}	Huangwei	January 21, 1996	Xinglong	SCAP	·	3.7 km	MPC; JPL
20133	1996 CO_{2}	—	February 12, 1996	Oizumi	T. Kobayashi	EOS	8.7 km	MPC; JPL
20134 Yeqisun	1996 GT_{2}	Yeqisun	April 8, 1996	Xinglong	SCAP	TIR	10 km	MPC; JPL
20135 Juels	1996 JC	Juels	May 7, 1996	Prescott	P. G. Comba	·	6.8 km	MPC; JPL
20136 Eisenhart	1996 NA	Eisenhart	July 8, 1996	Prescott	P. G. Comba	H	2.2 km	MPC; JPL
20137 Àngeljorba	1996 PX_{8}	Àngeljorba	August 8, 1996	La Silla	E. W. Elst	·	2.4 km	MPC; JPL
20138 Carinalee	1996 QP	Carinalee	August 17, 1996	Haleakala	NEAT	·	2.4 km	MPC; JPL
20139 Marianeschi	1996 QU	Marianeschi	August 19, 1996	Stroncone	A. Vagnozzi	PHO	2.9 km	MPC; JPL
20140 Costitx	1996 QT_{1}	Costitx	August 23, 1996	Majorca	Blasco, M.	·	9.8 km	MPC; JPL
20141 Markidger	1996 RL_{5}	Markidger	September 13, 1996	Majorca	Blasco, M.	·	3.4 km	MPC; JPL
20142 Joannaclark	1996 RC_{12}	Joannaclark	September 8, 1996	Kitt Peak	Spacewatch	·	2.6 km	MPC; JPL
20143 Julianegross	1996 RQ_{16}	Julianegross	September 13, 1996	Kitt Peak	Spacewatch	·	3.0 km	MPC; JPL
20144	1996 RA_{33}	—	September 15, 1996	La Silla	Uppsala-DLR Trojan Survey	L4	27 km	MPC; JPL
20145 Chiachiaolin	1996 SS_{4}	Chiachiaolin	September 20, 1996	Xinglong	SCAP	·	3.2 km	MPC; JPL
20146	1996 SM_{7}	—	September 30, 1996	Uppsala	Kamel, L., Lundgren, K.	·	2.6 km	MPC; JPL
20147	1996 SV_{7}	—	September 18, 1996	Xinglong	SCAP	V	2.5 km	MPC; JPL
20148 Carducci	1996 TR	Carducci	October 4, 1996	Farra d'Isonzo	Farra d'Isonzo	V	1.9 km	MPC; JPL
20149 Huh	1996 TX_{3}	Huh	October 8, 1996	Haleakala	NEAT	·	3.0 km	MPC; JPL
20150 Changshuhong	1996 TJ_{6}	Changshuhong	October 5, 1996	Xinglong	SCAP	·	3.5 km	MPC; JPL
20151 Utsunomiya	1996 TO_{6}	Utsunomiya	October 5, 1996	Kuma Kogen	A. Nakamura	·	2.8 km	MPC; JPL
20152 Regberg	1996 TQ_{7}	Regberg	October 9, 1996	Haleakala	NEAT	·	2.3 km	MPC; JPL
20153	1996 TC_{8}	—	October 12, 1996	Sudbury	D. di Cicco	·	2.5 km	MPC; JPL
20154	1996 TO_{10}	—	October 9, 1996	Kushiro	S. Ueda, H. Kaneda	·	4.6 km	MPC; JPL
20155 Utewindolf	1996 TS_{11}	Utewindolf	October 13, 1996	Prescott	P. G. Comba	NYS	2.2 km	MPC; JPL
20156 Herbwindolf	1996 TU_{11}	Herbwindolf	October 13, 1996	Prescott	P. G. Comba	·	2.4 km	MPC; JPL
20157 Andreaharrington	1996 TS_{18}	Andreaharrington	October 4, 1996	Kitt Peak	Spacewatch	·	2.6 km	MPC; JPL
20158 Allton	1996 TD_{21}	Allton	October 5, 1996	Kitt Peak	Spacewatch	·	2.7 km	MPC; JPL
20159 Snead	1996 TM_{28}	Snead	October 7, 1996	Kitt Peak	Spacewatch	·	2.2 km	MPC; JPL
20160 Annałosiak	1996 TH_{42}	Annałosiak	October 8, 1996	La Silla	E. W. Elst	·	3.0 km	MPC; JPL
20161	1996 TR_{66}	—	October 8, 1996	Mauna Kea	D. C. Jewitt, C. A. Trujillo, J. X. Luu, J. Chen	twotino	122 km	MPC; JPL
20162	1996 UD	—	October 16, 1996	Oizumi	T. Kobayashi	·	4.0 km	MPC; JPL
20163	1996 UG	—	October 16, 1996	Oizumi	T. Kobayashi	·	3.1 km	MPC; JPL
20164 Janzajíc	1996 VJ_{2}	Janzajíc	November 9, 1996	Kleť	J. Tichá, M. Tichý	·	2.5 km	MPC; JPL
20165 Zeigler	1996 VT_{2}	Zeigler	November 10, 1996	Sudbury	D. di Cicco	NYS	2.9 km	MPC; JPL
20166	1996 VQ_{4}	—	November 13, 1996	Oizumi	T. Kobayashi	·	4.7 km	MPC; JPL
20167	1996 VX_{4}	—	November 13, 1996	Oizumi	T. Kobayashi	NYS	3.2 km	MPC; JPL
20168	1996 VY_{4}	—	November 13, 1996	Oizumi	T. Kobayashi	·	6.1 km	MPC; JPL
20169 Ritchey	1996 VG_{11}	Ritchey	November 4, 1996	Kitt Peak	Spacewatch	·	3.1 km	MPC; JPL
20170	1996 VM_{30}	—	November 7, 1996	Kushiro	S. Ueda, H. Kaneda	·	3.8 km	MPC; JPL
20171 Salerno	1996 WC_{2}	Salerno	November 30, 1996	Dossobuono	Lai, L.	·	2.3 km	MPC; JPL
20172 Martin	1996 XT_{16}	Martin	December 4, 1996	Kitt Peak	Spacewatch	NYS	2.6 km	MPC; JPL
20173	1996 XO_{19}	—	December 8, 1996	Oizumi	T. Kobayashi	(5)	2.9 km	MPC; JPL
20174 Eisenstein	1996 XD_{20}	Eisenstein	December 13, 1996	Prescott	P. G. Comba	·	3.4 km	MPC; JPL
20175 Starmus	1996 XJ_{27}	Starmus	December 7, 1996	Kitt Peak	Spacewatch	·	9.9 km	MPC; JPL
20176 Aliciagoyena	1996 XK_{29}	Aliciagoyena	December 13, 1996	Kitt Peak	Spacewatch	·	4.0 km	MPC; JPL
20177 Richardallen	1996 XP_{29}	Richardallen	December 13, 1996	Kitt Peak	Spacewatch	·	6.9 km	MPC; JPL
20178	1996 XE_{31}	—	December 14, 1996	Oizumi	T. Kobayashi	·	5.5 km	MPC; JPL
20179 Huangtianyi	1996 XX_{31}	Huangtianyi	December 12, 1996	Xinglong	SCAP	PHO	7.2 km	MPC; JPL
20180 Annakolény	1996 YG_{1}	Annakolény	December 27, 1996	Modra	A. Galád, Pravda, A.	PHO	3.3 km	MPC; JPL
20181	1996 YC_{2}	—	December 22, 1996	Xinglong	SCAP	·	3.1 km	MPC; JPL
20182	1997 AS	—	January 2, 1997	Oizumi	T. Kobayashi	·	4.0 km	MPC; JPL
20183	1997 AD_{1}	—	January 2, 1997	Oizumi	T. Kobayashi	·	4.8 km	MPC; JPL
20184	1997 AM_{4}	—	January 6, 1997	Oizumi	T. Kobayashi	EUN	5.1 km	MPC; JPL
20185	1997 AC_{7}	—	January 9, 1997	Oizumi	T. Kobayashi	·	5.0 km	MPC; JPL
20186 Seda	1997 AD_{8}	Seda	January 2, 1997	Kitt Peak	Spacewatch	·	3.5 km	MPC; JPL
20187 Janapittichová	1997 AN_{17}	Janapittichová	January 14, 1997	Kleť	M. Tichý	PHO	5.2 km	MPC; JPL
20188	1997 AC_{18}	—	January 15, 1997	Oizumi	T. Kobayashi	·	4.8 km	MPC; JPL
20189	1997 BS_{2}	—	January 30, 1997	Oizumi	T. Kobayashi	·	2.4 km	MPC; JPL
20190	1997 BZ_{2}	—	January 30, 1997	Oizumi	T. Kobayashi	·	3.3 km	MPC; JPL
20191	1997 BS_{3}	—	January 31, 1997	Oizumi	T. Kobayashi	·	4.0 km	MPC; JPL
20192 Thomasback	1997 BE_{4}	Thomasback	January 31, 1997	Kitt Peak	Spacewatch	·	6.6 km	MPC; JPL
20193 Yakushima	1997 BH_{8}	Yakushima	January 18, 1997	Chichibu	N. Satō	·	12 km	MPC; JPL
20194 Ilarialocantore	1997 BH_{9}	Ilarialocantore	January 30, 1997	Cima Ekar	M. Tombelli, C. Casacci	KOR	4.5 km	MPC; JPL
20195 Mariovinci	1997 BS_{9}	Mariovinci	January 30, 1997	Cima Ekar	U. Munari, M. Tombelli	·	4.4 km	MPC; JPL
20196	1997 CP_{19}	—	February 11, 1997	Oizumi	T. Kobayashi	·	4.5 km	MPC; JPL
20197 Enriques	1997 CK_{22}	Enriques	February 14, 1997	Prescott	P. G. Comba	EUN	3.3 km	MPC; JPL
20198	1997 CL_{28}	—	February 13, 1997	Xinglong	SCAP	·	3.2 km	MPC; JPL
20199	1997 DR	—	February 28, 1997	Church Stretton	S. P. Laurie	·	5.2 km	MPC; JPL
20200 Donbacky	1997 DW	Donbacky	February 28, 1997	Montelupo	M. Tombelli, G. Forti	GEF	4.1 km	MPC; JPL

== 20201–20300 ==
back to top

Designation			Discovery			Properties		Ref
Permanent	Provisional	Named after	Date	Site	Discoverer(s)	Category	Diam.	Ref
20201	1997 EK_{6}	—	March 6, 1997	Kleť	Kleť	MAR	4.5 km	MPC; JPL
20202	1997 EC_{25}	—	March 7, 1997	Kitt Peak	Spacewatch	·	6.4 km	MPC; JPL
20203	1997 ED_{25}	—	March 7, 1997	Kitt Peak	Spacewatch	·	3.4 km	MPC; JPL
20204 Yuudurunosato	1997 EV_{25}	Yuudurunosato	March 1, 1997	Nanyo	T. Okuni	AGN	6.6 km	MPC; JPL
20205 Sitanchen	1997 EJ_{34}	Sitanchen	March 4, 1997	Socorro	LINEAR	·	3.8 km	MPC; JPL
20206 Annewellbrock	1997 FA_{4}	Annewellbrock	March 31, 1997	Socorro	LINEAR	URS	14 km	MPC; JPL
20207 Dyckovsky	1997 FB_{4}	Dyckovsky	March 31, 1997	Socorro	LINEAR	EOS	6.0 km	MPC; JPL
20208 Philiphe	1997 FC_{4}	Philiphe	March 31, 1997	Socorro	LINEAR	EOS	6.5 km	MPC; JPL
20209	1997 FE_{5}	—	March 30, 1997	Xinglong	SCAP	KOR	4.0 km	MPC; JPL
20210 Athanasopoulos	1997 GQ_{7}	Athanasopoulos	April 2, 1997	Socorro	LINEAR	·	20 km	MPC; JPL
20211 Joycegates	1997 GK_{8}	Joycegates	April 2, 1997	Socorro	LINEAR	·	7.5 km	MPC; JPL
20212 Ekbaltouma	1997 GR_{8}	Ekbaltouma	April 3, 1997	Socorro	LINEAR	·	5.6 km	MPC; JPL
20213 Saurabhsharan	1997 GE_{20}	Saurabhsharan	April 5, 1997	Socorro	LINEAR	KOR	5.1 km	MPC; JPL
20214 Lorikenny	1997 GL_{21}	Lorikenny	April 6, 1997	Socorro	LINEAR	KOR	3.8 km	MPC; JPL
20215	1997 GQ_{26}	—	April 7, 1997	Kitt Peak	Spacewatch	·	3.5 km	MPC; JPL
20216	1997 GS_{27}	—	April 9, 1997	Xinglong	SCAP	·	3.4 km	MPC; JPL
20217 Kathyclemmer	1997 GK_{33}	Kathyclemmer	April 3, 1997	Socorro	LINEAR	·	7.3 km	MPC; JPL
20218 Dukewriter	1997 GT_{34}	Dukewriter	April 3, 1997	Socorro	LINEAR	·	5.7 km	MPC; JPL
20219 Brianstone	1997 GP_{36}	Brianstone	April 6, 1997	Socorro	LINEAR	·	12 km	MPC; JPL
20220 Beebe	1997 GA_{40}	Beebe	April 7, 1997	La Silla	E. W. Elst	·	7.9 km	MPC; JPL
20221 Bektešević	1997 HV_{8}	Bektešević	April 30, 1997	Socorro	LINEAR	THM	5.3 km	MPC; JPL
20222 Benseguane	1997 HP_{11}	Benseguane	April 30, 1997	Socorro	LINEAR	KOR	4.6 km	MPC; JPL
20223	1997 HK_{16}	—	April 30, 1997	Kitt Peak	Spacewatch	KOR	5.9 km	MPC; JPL
20224 Johnrae	1997 JR_{13}	Johnrae	May 3, 1997	La Silla	E. W. Elst	·	13 km	MPC; JPL
20225 Petrunin	1997 MG_{1}	Petrunin	June 26, 1997	Kitt Peak	Spacewatch	EOS	9.3 km	MPC; JPL
20226	1997 NG_{6}	—	July 11, 1997	Lake Clear	Williams, K. A.	·	8.5 km	MPC; JPL
20227 Bernardinelli	1997 WS_{35}	Bernardinelli	November 29, 1997	Socorro	LINEAR	·	5.8 km	MPC; JPL
20228 Jeanmarcmari	1997 XG	Jeanmarcmari	December 3, 1997	Caussols	ODAS	·	3.0 km	MPC; JPL
20229	1997 XX_{4}	—	December 6, 1997	Caussols	ODAS	·	2.4 km	MPC; JPL
20230 Blanchard	1997 XH_{5}	Blanchard	December 6, 1997	Caussols	ODAS	·	2.3 km	MPC; JPL
20231	1997 YK	—	December 18, 1997	Oizumi	T. Kobayashi	H · slow	3.4 km	MPC; JPL
20232	1997 YK_{2}	—	December 21, 1997	Oizumi	T. Kobayashi	·	2.0 km	MPC; JPL
20233	1998 AZ_{6}	—	January 5, 1998	Xinglong	SCAP	·	2.8 km	MPC; JPL
20234 Billgibson	1998 AV_{9}	Billgibson	January 6, 1998	Anderson Mesa	M. W. Buie	·	2.6 km	MPC; JPL
20235	1998 BA_{7}	—	January 24, 1998	Oizumi	T. Kobayashi	·	6.4 km	MPC; JPL
20236	1998 BZ_{7}	—	January 24, 1998	Haleakala	NEAT	APO +1km · PHA	1.0 km	MPC; JPL
20237 Clavius	1998 CC_{3}	Clavius	February 6, 1998	La Silla	E. W. Elst	·	3.6 km	MPC; JPL
20238 Krohm	1998 DT_{7}	Krohm	February 23, 1998	Haleakala	NEAT	·	3.7 km	MPC; JPL
20239	1998 DT_{12}	—	February 24, 1998	Kitt Peak	Spacewatch	·	1.8 km	MPC; JPL
20240	1998 DC_{13}	—	February 24, 1998	Haleakala	NEAT	·	3.1 km	MPC; JPL
20241	1998 DV_{23}	—	February 27, 1998	Caussols	ODAS	·	2.7 km	MPC; JPL
20242 Sagot	1998 DN_{27}	Sagot	February 27, 1998	Bédoin	P. Antonini	·	5.0 km	MPC; JPL
20243 Den Bosch	1998 DB_{36}	Den Bosch	February 25, 1998	La Silla	E. W. Elst	·	5.6 km	MPC; JPL
20244	1998 EF	—	March 1, 1998	Oizumi	T. Kobayashi	·	3.2 km	MPC; JPL
20245 Peck	1998 EL_{5}	Peck	March 1, 1998	Kitt Peak	Spacewatch	V · slow	2.2 km	MPC; JPL
20246 Frappa	1998 ER_{6}	Frappa	March 1, 1998	Caussols	ODAS	·	2.4 km	MPC; JPL
20247	1998 EB_{9}	—	March 2, 1998	Xinglong	SCAP	·	2.6 km	MPC; JPL
20248	1998 EE_{10}	—	March 2, 1998	Xinglong	SCAP	·	4.0 km	MPC; JPL
20249 Bincheng	1998 EM_{10}	Bincheng	March 1, 1998	La Silla	E. W. Elst	·	2.5 km	MPC; JPL
20250 Burdanov	1998 EP_{11}	Burdanov	March 1, 1998	La Silla	E. W. Elst	PHO	3.0 km	MPC; JPL
20251 Carminegiordano	1998 EA_{12}	Carminegiordano	March 1, 1998	La Silla	E. W. Elst	·	3.6 km	MPC; JPL
20252 Eyjafjallajökull	1998 EY_{13}	Eyjafjallajökull	March 1, 1998	La Silla	E. W. Elst	·	2.3 km	MPC; JPL
20253	1998 EJ_{21}	—	March 1, 1998	Xinglong	SCAP	·	2.5 km	MPC; JPL
20254 Úpice	1998 FE_{2}	Úpice	March 21, 1998	Ondřejov	P. Pravec	·	3.4 km	MPC; JPL
20255	1998 FX_{2}	—	March 22, 1998	Socorro	LINEAR	AMO	730 m	MPC; JPL
20256 Adolfneckař	1998 FC_{3}	Adolfneckař	March 23, 1998	Ondřejov	P. Pravec	·	2.7 km	MPC; JPL
20257	1998 FL_{6}	—	March 18, 1998	Kitt Peak	Spacewatch	·	3.0 km	MPC; JPL
20258	1998 FF_{10}	—	March 24, 1998	Caussols	ODAS	·	2.8 km	MPC; JPL
20259 Alanhoffman	1998 FV_{10}	Alanhoffman	March 24, 1998	Caussols	ODAS	·	2.8 km	MPC; JPL
20260	1998 FL_{11}	—	March 22, 1998	Oizumi	T. Kobayashi	·	4.9 km	MPC; JPL
20261	1998 FM_{12}	—	March 19, 1998	Xinglong	SCAP	·	6.2 km	MPC; JPL
20262	1998 FB_{14}	—	March 25, 1998	Haleakala	NEAT	·	10 km	MPC; JPL
20263	1998 FF_{16}	—	March 25, 1998	Gekko	T. Kagawa	NYS	3.6 km	MPC; JPL
20264 Chauhan	1998 FV_{20}	Chauhan	March 20, 1998	Socorro	LINEAR	MAS	3.8 km	MPC; JPL
20265 Yuyinchen	1998 FP_{23}	Yuyinchen	March 20, 1998	Socorro	LINEAR	·	3.0 km	MPC; JPL
20266 Danielchoi	1998 FK_{26}	Danielchoi	March 20, 1998	Socorro	LINEAR	·	2.6 km	MPC; JPL
20267 Carrieholt	1998 FU_{27}	Carrieholt	March 20, 1998	Socorro	LINEAR	·	4.7 km	MPC; JPL
20268 Racollier	1998 FC_{28}	Racollier	March 20, 1998	Socorro	LINEAR	V	2.4 km	MPC; JPL
20269 Cecilysunday	1998 FF_{28}	Cecilysunday	March 20, 1998	Socorro	LINEAR	·	2.9 km	MPC; JPL
20270 Phildeutsch	1998 FR_{30}	Phildeutsch	March 20, 1998	Socorro	LINEAR	NYS	3.1 km	MPC; JPL
20271 Allygoldberg	1998 FK_{32}	Allygoldberg	March 20, 1998	Socorro	LINEAR	·	5.9 km	MPC; JPL
20272 Duyha	1998 FH_{33}	Duyha	March 20, 1998	Socorro	LINEAR	·	2.5 km	MPC; JPL
20273 Charlottebays	1998 FO_{37}	Charlottebays	March 20, 1998	Socorro	LINEAR	·	2.5 km	MPC; JPL
20274 Halperin	1998 FZ_{40}	Halperin	March 20, 1998	Socorro	LINEAR	·	2.1 km	MPC; JPL
20275 Chrishamann	1998 FR_{41}	Chrishamann	March 20, 1998	Socorro	LINEAR	fast	3.1 km	MPC; JPL
20276 Chrystianpereira	1998 FO_{42}	Chrystianpereira	March 20, 1998	Socorro	LINEAR	·	1.5 km	MPC; JPL
20277 Clementlee	1998 FL_{44}	Clementlee	March 20, 1998	Socorro	LINEAR	EUN	4.5 km	MPC; JPL
20278 Qileihang	1998 FP_{45}	Qileihang	March 20, 1998	Socorro	LINEAR	NYS	3.0 km	MPC; JPL
20279 Harel	1998 FZ_{47}	Harel	March 20, 1998	Socorro	LINEAR	·	3.6 km	MPC; JPL
20280 Colazo	1998 FQ_{49}	Colazo	March 20, 1998	Socorro	LINEAR	NYS	6.1 km	MPC; JPL
20281 Kathartman	1998 FZ_{49}	Kathartman	March 20, 1998	Socorro	LINEAR	V	3.3 km	MPC; JPL
20282 Hedberg	1998 FT_{51}	Hedberg	March 20, 1998	Socorro	LINEAR	·	1.8 km	MPC; JPL
20283 Elizaheller	1998 FG_{55}	Elizaheller	March 20, 1998	Socorro	LINEAR	(5)	4.1 km	MPC; JPL
20284 Andreilevin	1998 FL_{58}	Andreilevin	March 20, 1998	Socorro	LINEAR	·	2.4 km	MPC; JPL
20285 Lubin	1998 FU_{58}	Lubin	March 20, 1998	Socorro	LINEAR	V	2.5 km	MPC; JPL
20286 Michta	1998 FT_{59}	Michta	March 20, 1998	Socorro	LINEAR	V	2.3 km	MPC; JPL
20287 Munteanu	1998 FT_{61}	Munteanu	March 20, 1998	Socorro	LINEAR	NYS	3.7 km	MPC; JPL
20288 Nachbaur	1998 FR_{62}	Nachbaur	March 20, 1998	Socorro	LINEAR	·	5.0 km	MPC; JPL
20289 Nettimi	1998 FQ_{64}	Nettimi	March 20, 1998	Socorro	LINEAR	V	3.2 km	MPC; JPL
20290 Seanraj	1998 FJ_{65}	Seanraj	March 20, 1998	Socorro	LINEAR	·	1.8 km	MPC; JPL
20291 Raumurthy	1998 FF_{67}	Raumurthy	March 20, 1998	Socorro	LINEAR	NYS	2.0 km	MPC; JPL
20292 Eduardreznik	1998 FV_{70}	Eduardreznik	March 20, 1998	Socorro	LINEAR	·	2.7 km	MPC; JPL
20293 Sirichelson	1998 FQ_{72}	Sirichelson	March 20, 1998	Socorro	LINEAR	NYS	3.9 km	MPC; JPL
20294	1998 FA_{73}	—	March 27, 1998	Caussols	ODAS	V	2.0 km	MPC; JPL
20295 Corgne	1998 FF_{75}	Corgne	March 24, 1998	Socorro	LINEAR	V	4.5 km	MPC; JPL
20296 Shayestorm	1998 FL_{76}	Shayestorm	March 24, 1998	Socorro	LINEAR	·	3.4 km	MPC; JPL
20297 Cristianomat	1998 FQ_{76}	Cristianomat	March 24, 1998	Socorro	LINEAR	·	8.3 km	MPC; JPL
20298 Gordonsu	1998 FW_{77}	Gordonsu	March 24, 1998	Socorro	LINEAR	·	4.9 km	MPC; JPL
20299 Danielkelley	1998 FH_{78}	Danielkelley	March 24, 1998	Socorro	LINEAR	·	5.2 km	MPC; JPL
20300 Arjunsuri	1998 FE_{84}	Arjunsuri	March 24, 1998	Socorro	LINEAR	·	2.7 km	MPC; JPL

== 20301–20400 ==
back to top

Designation			Discovery			Properties		Ref
Permanent	Provisional	Named after	Date	Site	Discoverer(s)	Category	Diam.	Ref
20301 Thakur	1998 FY_{99}	Thakur	March 31, 1998	Socorro	LINEAR	·	4.1 km	MPC; JPL
20302 Kevinwang	1998 FW_{100}	Kevinwang	March 31, 1998	Socorro	LINEAR	V	3.0 km	MPC; JPL
20303 Lindwestrick	1998 FU_{101}	Lindwestrick	March 31, 1998	Socorro	LINEAR	·	4.8 km	MPC; JPL
20304 Wolfson	1998 FA_{102}	Wolfson	March 31, 1998	Socorro	LINEAR	·	4.2 km	MPC; JPL
20305 Feliciayen	1998 FU_{102}	Feliciayen	March 31, 1998	Socorro	LINEAR	V	2.4 km	MPC; JPL
20306 Richarnold	1998 FC_{106}	Richarnold	March 31, 1998	Socorro	LINEAR	·	2.9 km	MPC; JPL
20307 Johnbarnes	1998 FH_{106}	Johnbarnes	March 31, 1998	Socorro	LINEAR	·	3.8 km	MPC; JPL
20308 Daohaili	1998 FP_{109}	Daohaili	March 31, 1998	Socorro	LINEAR	V	3.3 km	MPC; JPL
20309 Batalden	1998 FD_{110}	Batalden	March 31, 1998	Socorro	LINEAR	·	3.8 km	MPC; JPL
20310 Donggooroh	1998 FD_{117}	Donggooroh	March 31, 1998	Socorro	LINEAR	·	3.6 km	MPC; JPL
20311 Nancycarter	1998 FH_{117}	Nancycarter	March 31, 1998	Socorro	LINEAR	·	2.4 km	MPC; JPL
20312 Danahy	1998 FH_{118}	Danahy	March 31, 1998	Socorro	LINEAR	V	3.1 km	MPC; JPL
20313 Fredrikson	1998 FM_{122}	Fredrikson	March 20, 1998	Socorro	LINEAR	·	5.1 km	MPC; JPL
20314 Johnharrison	1998 FN_{126}	Johnharrison	March 28, 1998	Reedy Creek	J. Broughton	·	3.8 km	MPC; JPL
20315 Dotson	1998 FD_{130}	Dotson	March 22, 1998	Socorro	LINEAR	·	4.0 km	MPC; JPL
20316 Jerahalpern	1998 FU_{138}	Jerahalpern	March 28, 1998	Socorro	LINEAR	·	3.3 km	MPC; JPL
20317 Hendrickson	1998 FD_{144}	Hendrickson	March 29, 1998	Socorro	LINEAR	·	3.6 km	MPC; JPL
20318	1998 GZ	—	April 3, 1998	Oohira	T. Urata	·	2.2 km	MPC; JPL
20319	1998 GK_{1}	—	April 5, 1998	Woomera	F. B. Zoltowski	·	6.5 km	MPC; JPL
20320 Eloypeña	1998 GH_{8}	Eloypeña	April 2, 1998	Socorro	LINEAR	·	9.2 km	MPC; JPL
20321 Lightdonovan	1998 HJ_{19}	Lightdonovan	April 18, 1998	Socorro	LINEAR	·	2.4 km	MPC; JPL
20322 Emilwilawer	1998 HZ_{20}	Emilwilawer	April 20, 1998	Socorro	LINEAR	·	4.8 km	MPC; JPL
20323 Tomlindstom	1998 HC_{21}	Tomlindstom	April 20, 1998	Socorro	LINEAR	·	3.1 km	MPC; JPL
20324 Johnmahoney	1998 HF_{22}	Johnmahoney	April 20, 1998	Socorro	LINEAR	·	2.3 km	MPC; JPL
20325 Julianoey	1998 HO_{27}	Julianoey	April 21, 1998	Kitt Peak	Spacewatch	moon	4.9 km	MPC; JPL
20326 Erard	1998 HG_{37}	Erard	April 20, 1998	Socorro	LINEAR	·	7.3 km	MPC; JPL
20327 Fernandotinaut	1998 HQ_{39}	Fernandotinaut	April 20, 1998	Socorro	LINEAR	THM	8.0 km	MPC; JPL
20328	1998 HS_{42}	—	April 30, 1998	Lime Creek	R. Linderholm	·	10 km	MPC; JPL
20329 Manfro	1998 HQ_{43}	Manfro	April 20, 1998	Socorro	LINEAR	·	2.7 km	MPC; JPL
20330 Manwell	1998 HY_{44}	Manwell	April 20, 1998	Socorro	LINEAR	·	4.7 km	MPC; JPL
20331 Bijemarks	1998 HH_{45}	Bijemarks	April 20, 1998	Socorro	LINEAR	·	9.0 km	MPC; JPL
20332	1998 HO_{49}	—	April 25, 1998	Haleakala	NEAT	·	2.7 km	MPC; JPL
20333 Johannhuth	1998 HH_{51}	Johannhuth	April 25, 1998	Anderson Mesa	LONEOS	·	3.4 km	MPC; JPL
20334 Glewitsky	1998 HL_{51}	Glewitsky	April 25, 1998	Anderson Mesa	LONEOS	·	2.7 km	MPC; JPL
20335 Charmartell	1998 HK_{57}	Charmartell	April 21, 1998	Socorro	LINEAR	·	2.6 km	MPC; JPL
20336 Gretamills	1998 HY_{61}	Gretamills	April 21, 1998	Socorro	LINEAR	·	4.9 km	MPC; JPL
20337 Naeve	1998 HP_{83}	Naeve	April 21, 1998	Socorro	LINEAR	·	4.0 km	MPC; JPL
20338 Elainepappas	1998 HA_{86}	Elainepappas	April 21, 1998	Socorro	LINEAR	KOR	3.9 km	MPC; JPL
20339 Eileenreed	1998 HM_{88}	Eileenreed	April 21, 1998	Socorro	LINEAR	KOR	4.2 km	MPC; JPL
20340 Susanruder	1998 HR_{91}	Susanruder	April 21, 1998	Socorro	LINEAR	NYS	3.2 km	MPC; JPL
20341 Alanstack	1998 HX_{91}	Alanstack	April 21, 1998	Socorro	LINEAR	·	3.7 km	MPC; JPL
20342 Trinh	1998 HB_{97}	Trinh	April 21, 1998	Socorro	LINEAR	·	3.6 km	MPC; JPL
20343 Vaccariello	1998 HC_{100}	Vaccariello	April 21, 1998	Socorro	LINEAR	·	3.8 km	MPC; JPL
20344 Filippotusberti	1998 HF_{103}	Filippotusberti	April 25, 1998	La Silla	E. W. Elst	·	3.7 km	MPC; JPL
20345 Davidvito	1998 HH_{114}	Davidvito	April 23, 1998	Socorro	LINEAR	V	2.8 km	MPC; JPL
20346 Firre	1998 HZ_{114}	Firre	April 23, 1998	Socorro	LINEAR	·	8.4 km	MPC; JPL
20347 Wunderlich	1998 HM_{121}	Wunderlich	April 23, 1998	Socorro	LINEAR	NEM	6.6 km	MPC; JPL
20348 Fodde	1998 HK_{122}	Fodde	April 23, 1998	Socorro	LINEAR	·	4.8 km	MPC; JPL
20349 Gabrielpinto	1998 HU_{123}	Gabrielpinto	April 23, 1998	Socorro	LINEAR	EUN	5.2 km	MPC; JPL
20350 Georgebrydon	1998 HV_{125}	Georgebrydon	April 23, 1998	Socorro	LINEAR	·	7.6 km	MPC; JPL
20351 Kaborchardt	1998 HN_{127}	Kaborchardt	April 18, 1998	Socorro	LINEAR	·	3.8 km	MPC; JPL
20352 Pinakibose	1998 HC_{129}	Pinakibose	April 19, 1998	Socorro	LINEAR	·	2.9 km	MPC; JPL
20353 Gianotto	1998 HD_{129}	Gianotto	April 19, 1998	Socorro	LINEAR	EUN	3.6 km	MPC; JPL
20354 Rebeccachan	1998 HA_{139}	Rebeccachan	April 21, 1998	Socorro	LINEAR	·	2.9 km	MPC; JPL
20355 Saraclark	1998 HD_{146}	Saraclark	April 21, 1998	Socorro	LINEAR	·	2.9 km	MPC; JPL
20356 Giopoggiali	1998 HG_{147}	Giopoggiali	April 23, 1998	Socorro	LINEAR	·	6.2 km	MPC; JPL
20357 Shireendhir	1998 HP_{147}	Shireendhir	April 23, 1998	Socorro	LINEAR	·	5.8 km	MPC; JPL
20358 Dalem	1998 HD_{148}	Dalem	April 25, 1998	La Silla	E. W. Elst	EUN	6.0 km	MPC; JPL
20359	1998 JR	—	May 1, 1998	Haleakala	NEAT	·	4.4 km	MPC; JPL
20360 Holsapple	1998 JO_{2}	Holsapple	May 1, 1998	Anderson Mesa	LONEOS	·	3.4 km	MPC; JPL
20361 Romanishin	1998 JD_{3}	Romanishin	May 1, 1998	Anderson Mesa	LONEOS	EUN	3.6 km	MPC; JPL
20362 Trilling	1998 JH_{3}	Trilling	May 1, 1998	Anderson Mesa	LONEOS	·	5.8 km	MPC; JPL
20363 Komitov	1998 KU_{1}	Komitov	May 18, 1998	Anderson Mesa	LONEOS	·	8.4 km	MPC; JPL
20364 Zdeněkmiler	1998 KC_{5}	Zdeněkmiler	May 20, 1998	Kleť	M. Tichý, Z. Moravec	KOR	8.9 km	MPC; JPL
20365	1998 KD_{5}	—	May 24, 1998	Woomera	F. B. Zoltowski	EOS	8.8 km	MPC; JPL
20366 Bonev	1998 KP_{8}	Bonev	May 23, 1998	Anderson Mesa	LONEOS	GEF	5.8 km	MPC; JPL
20367 Erikagibb	1998 KT_{8}	Erikagibb	May 23, 1998	Anderson Mesa	LONEOS	DOR	9.6 km	MPC; JPL
20368	1998 KF_{10}	—	May 27, 1998	Lake Clear	Williams, K. A.	·	7.4 km	MPC; JPL
20369 Giuliobaù	1998 KE_{16}	Giuliobaù	May 22, 1998	Socorro	LINEAR	·	11 km	MPC; JPL
20370 Gkotsinas	1998 KR_{29}	Gkotsinas	May 22, 1998	Socorro	LINEAR	PAD	7.7 km	MPC; JPL
20371 Ekladyous	1998 KE_{30}	Ekladyous	May 22, 1998	Socorro	LINEAR	slow	7.9 km	MPC; JPL
20372 Juliafanning	1998 KS_{35}	Juliafanning	May 22, 1998	Socorro	LINEAR	·	3.1 km	MPC; JPL
20373 Fullmer	1998 KX_{37}	Fullmer	May 22, 1998	Socorro	LINEAR	·	4.5 km	MPC; JPL
20374 Gomesjunior	1998 KD_{38}	Gomesjunior	May 22, 1998	Socorro	LINEAR	·	6.3 km	MPC; JPL
20375 Sherrigerten	1998 KU_{38}	Sherrigerten	May 22, 1998	Socorro	LINEAR	·	7.7 km	MPC; JPL
20376 Joyhines	1998 KB_{44}	Joyhines	May 22, 1998	Socorro	LINEAR	MAS	2.5 km	MPC; JPL
20377 Jakubisin	1998 KX_{46}	Jakubisin	May 22, 1998	Socorro	LINEAR	·	3.7 km	MPC; JPL
20378 Graykowski	1998 KZ_{46}	Graykowski	May 22, 1998	Socorro	LINEAR	MAR	8.0 km	MPC; JPL
20379 Christijohns	1998 KS_{47}	Christijohns	May 22, 1998	Socorro	LINEAR	·	7.0 km	MPC; JPL
20380 Grégoirehenry	1998 KW_{47}	Grégoirehenry	May 22, 1998	Socorro	LINEAR	·	5.7 km	MPC; JPL
20381 Hikaruyabuta	1998 KX_{47}	Hikaruyabuta	May 22, 1998	Socorro	LINEAR	·	4.7 km	MPC; JPL
20382 Hiroshinaraoka	1998 KW_{49}	Hiroshinaraoka	May 23, 1998	Socorro	LINEAR	EOS	5.6 km	MPC; JPL
20383 Hirotakasawada	1998 KU_{51}	Hirotakasawada	May 23, 1998	Socorro	LINEAR	EOS	9.1 km	MPC; JPL
20384 Hongsuhyim	1998 KW_{51}	Hongsuhyim	May 23, 1998	Socorro	LINEAR	EUN	5.2 km	MPC; JPL
20385 Horiuchi	1998 KS_{53}	Horiuchi	May 23, 1998	Socorro	LINEAR	GEF	6.1 km	MPC; JPL
20386 Ianfranchi	1998 KK_{54}	Ianfranchi	May 23, 1998	Socorro	LINEAR	·	8.3 km	MPC; JPL
20387 Iharkacsillik	1998 KP_{54}	Iharkacsillik	May 23, 1998	Socorro	LINEAR	·	11 km	MPC; JPL
20388 Ihorkyrylenko	1998 KZ_{54}	Ihorkyrylenko	May 23, 1998	Socorro	LINEAR	EOS	7.8 km	MPC; JPL
20389 Imkedepater	1998 KA_{55}	Imkedepater	May 23, 1998	Socorro	LINEAR	EOS	9.6 km	MPC; JPL
20390 Isabelherrero	1998 KK_{55}	Isabelherrero	May 23, 1998	Socorro	LINEAR	·	4.7 km	MPC; JPL
20391 Ivantsov	1998 KT_{55}	Ivantsov	May 23, 1998	Socorro	LINEAR	·	10 km	MPC; JPL
20392 Mikeshepard	1998 MA_{8}	Mikeshepard	June 19, 1998	Anderson Mesa	LONEOS	·	12 km	MPC; JPL
20393 Kevinlane	1998 MZ_{8}	Kevinlane	June 19, 1998	Socorro	LINEAR	·	5.5 km	MPC; JPL
20394 Fatou	1998 MQ_{17}	Fatou	June 28, 1998	Prescott	P. G. Comba	slow	10 km	MPC; JPL
20395 Jacquet	1998 MY_{29}	Jacquet	June 24, 1998	Socorro	LINEAR	BRA	16 km	MPC; JPL
20396 Jaemannkyeong	1998 MF_{32}	Jaemannkyeong	June 24, 1998	Socorro	LINEAR	·	5.4 km	MPC; JPL
20397 Jamierobinson	1998 MR_{35}	Jamierobinson	June 24, 1998	Socorro	LINEAR	KOR	5.7 km	MPC; JPL
20398	1998 NQ	—	July 11, 1998	Woomera	F. B. Zoltowski	MAR	2.7 km	MPC; JPL
20399 Michaelesser	1998 OO	Michaelesser	July 20, 1998	Caussols	ODAS	HYG	8.4 km	MPC; JPL
20400 Fabricius	1998 OB_{4}	Fabricius	July 24, 1998	Caussols	ODAS	·	1.7 km	MPC; JPL

== 20401–20500 ==
back to top

Designation			Discovery			Properties		Ref
Permanent	Provisional	Named after	Date	Site	Discoverer(s)	Category	Diam.	Ref
20401 Janghyunpark	1998 OX_{5}	Janghyunpark	July 21, 1998	Socorro	LINEAR	·	4.7 km	MPC; JPL
20402	1998 OH_{6}	—	July 31, 1998	Višnjan Observatory	Višnjan	HYG	14 km	MPC; JPL
20403 Attenborough	1998 OW_{11}	Attenborough	July 22, 1998	Reedy Creek	J. Broughton	EOS	7.2 km	MPC; JPL
20404 Javiersuarez	1998 OB_{14}	Javiersuarez	July 26, 1998	La Silla	E. W. Elst	·	5.0 km	MPC; JPL
20405 Barryburke	1998 QP_{6}	Barryburke	August 24, 1998	Caussols	ODAS	(5)	3.9 km	MPC; JPL
20406 Jekanthanga	1998 QJ_{13}	Jekanthanga	August 17, 1998	Socorro	LINEAR	slow	5.3 km	MPC; JPL
20407 Jessicaagarwal	1998 QM_{20}	Jessicaagarwal	August 17, 1998	Socorro	LINEAR	·	10 km	MPC; JPL
20408 Jinbeniyama	1998 QW_{31}	Jinbeniyama	August 17, 1998	Socorro	LINEAR	·	3.0 km	MPC; JPL
20409 Joeychatelain	1998 QP_{43}	Joeychatelain	August 17, 1998	Socorro	LINEAR	slow	14 km	MPC; JPL
20410 Joosangyou	1998 QM_{51}	Joosangyou	August 17, 1998	Socorro	LINEAR	HYG	10 km	MPC; JPL
20411 Jooyeongeem	1998 QJ_{69}	Jooyeongeem	August 24, 1998	Socorro	LINEAR	·	11 km	MPC; JPL
20412 Josémaríamadiedo	1998 QG_{73}	Josémaríamadiedo	August 24, 1998	Socorro	LINEAR	EOS	12 km	MPC; JPL
20413 Josephdemartini	1998 QY_{91}	Josephdemartini	August 28, 1998	Socorro	LINEAR	·	2.3 km	MPC; JPL
20414	1998 RH_{16}	—	September 9, 1998	Caussols	ODAS	HYG	8.1 km	MPC; JPL
20415 Amandalu	1998 RL_{61}	Amandalu	September 14, 1998	Socorro	LINEAR	·	3.3 km	MPC; JPL
20416 Mansour	1998 RR_{65}	Mansour	September 14, 1998	Socorro	LINEAR	·	5.8 km	MPC; JPL
20417	1998 SA_{7}	—	September 20, 1998	Kitt Peak	Spacewatch	·	7.0 km	MPC; JPL
20418 Josephjao	1998 SH_{71}	Josephjao	September 21, 1998	La Silla	E. W. Elst	NYS ·	3.6 km	MPC; JPL
20419 Josephlazio	1998 SE_{117}	Josephlazio	September 26, 1998	Socorro	LINEAR	·	4.5 km	MPC; JPL
20420 Marashwhitman	1998 SN_{129}	Marashwhitman	September 26, 1998	Socorro	LINEAR	·	4.3 km	MPC; JPL
20421 Joshelliott	1998 TG_{3}	Joshelliott	October 14, 1998	Socorro	LINEAR	·	7.6 km	MPC; JPL
20422	1998 UE_{8}	—	October 23, 1998	Višnjan Observatory	K. Korlević	THM	13 km	MPC; JPL
20423 Juanluisrizos	1998 VN_{7}	Juanluisrizos	November 10, 1998	Socorro	LINEAR	·	7.2 km	MPC; JPL
20424	1998 VF_{30}	—	November 10, 1998	Socorro	LINEAR	L4	46 km	MPC; JPL
20425	1998 VD_{35}	—	November 15, 1998	Kitt Peak	Spacewatch	APO · PHA · critical	280 m	MPC; JPL
20426 Fridlund	1998 VW_{44}	Fridlund	November 13, 1998	La Silla	C.-I. Lagerkvist	·	10 km	MPC; JPL
20427 Hjalmar	1998 VX_{44}	Hjalmar	November 13, 1998	La Silla	C.-I. Lagerkvist	·	18 km	MPC; JPL
20428	1998 WG_{20}	—	November 18, 1998	Socorro	LINEAR	L4	27 km	MPC; JPL
20429	1998 YN_{1}	—	December 16, 1998	Socorro	LINEAR	APO +1km	1 km	MPC; JPL
20430 Stout	1999 AC_{3}	Stout	January 10, 1999	Baton Rouge	W. R. Cooney Jr., S. Lazar	EUN	3.4 km	MPC; JPL
20431	1999 AA_{10}	—	January 13, 1999	Višnjan Observatory	K. Korlević	·	2.5 km	MPC; JPL
20432	1999 BD_{12}	—	January 22, 1999	Oizumi	T. Kobayashi	·	7.6 km	MPC; JPL
20433 Prestinenza	1999 CL_{12}	Prestinenza	February 14, 1999	Ceccano	G. Masi	URS	11 km	MPC; JPL
20434	1999 FM_{10}	—	March 21, 1999	Višnjan Observatory	K. Korlević	EUN	9.3 km	MPC; JPL
20435 Juliendewit	1999 FU_{28}	Juliendewit	March 19, 1999	Socorro	LINEAR	·	4.2 km	MPC; JPL
20436 Julienserrecourt	1999 GA_{33}	Julienserrecourt	April 12, 1999	Socorro	LINEAR	·	2.9 km	MPC; JPL
20437 Selohusa	1999 JH_{1}	Selohusa	May 8, 1999	Catalina	CSS	V	2.7 km	MPC; JPL
20438 Julievermersch	1999 JP_{22}	Julievermersch	May 10, 1999	Socorro	LINEAR	·	3.5 km	MPC; JPL
20439 Junghyunjo	1999 JM_{28}	Junghyunjo	May 10, 1999	Socorro	LINEAR	NYS	4.5 km	MPC; JPL
20440 McClintock	1999 JO_{31}	McClintock	May 10, 1999	Socorro	LINEAR	MAS	3.7 km	MPC; JPL
20441 Elijahmena	1999 JH_{50}	Elijahmena	May 10, 1999	Socorro	LINEAR	·	2.7 km	MPC; JPL
20442 Kaiwünnemann	1999 JK_{52}	Kaiwünnemann	May 10, 1999	Socorro	LINEAR	·	2.7 km	MPC; JPL
20443	1999 JJ_{60}	—	May 10, 1999	Socorro	LINEAR	·	5.5 km	MPC; JPL
20444 Mamesser	1999 JK_{63}	Mamesser	May 10, 1999	Socorro	LINEAR	·	2.5 km	MPC; JPL
20445 Kanakosakamoto	1999 JN_{77}	Kanakosakamoto	May 12, 1999	Socorro	LINEAR	·	6.5 km	MPC; JPL
20446 Karolinadziadura	1999 JB_{80}	Karolinadziadura	May 14, 1999	Socorro	LINEAR	·	4.8 km	MPC; JPL
20447 Kateminker	1999 JR_{85}	Kateminker	May 15, 1999	Socorro	LINEAR	·	8.0 km	MPC; JPL
20448 Kathrinaltwegg	1999 JM_{96}	Kathrinaltwegg	May 12, 1999	Socorro	LINEAR	·	3.3 km	MPC; JPL
20449 Katiejoy	1999 JM_{108}	Katiejoy	May 13, 1999	Socorro	LINEAR	NYS	2.8 km	MPC; JPL
20450 Marymohammed	1999 JJ_{111}	Marymohammed	May 13, 1999	Socorro	LINEAR	·	2.0 km	MPC; JPL
20451 Galeotti	1999 JR_{134}	Galeotti	May 15, 1999	Anderson Mesa	LONEOS	·	3.5 km	MPC; JPL
20452 Kerraouch	1999 KG_{4}	Kerraouch	May 20, 1999	Socorro	LINEAR	·	4.4 km	MPC; JPL
20453 Kimberleylim	1999 KL_{6}	Kimberleylim	May 24, 1999	Socorro	LINEAR	·	3.1 km	MPC; JPL
20454 Pedrajo	1999 LD_{4}	Pedrajo	June 9, 1999	Socorro	LINEAR	V	2.7 km	MPC; JPL
20455 Pennell	1999 LE_{4}	Pennell	June 9, 1999	Socorro	LINEAR	·	2.8 km	MPC; JPL
20456	1999 LX_{6}	—	June 8, 1999	Kitt Peak	Spacewatch	·	7.7 km	MPC; JPL
20457	1999 LX_{7}	—	June 10, 1999	Woomera	F. B. Zoltowski	·	4.6 km	MPC; JPL
20458 Koshkin	1999 LZ_{21}	Koshkin	June 9, 1999	Socorro	LINEAR	·	3.5 km	MPC; JPL
20459 Krzysztoflangner	1999 LO_{26}	Krzysztoflangner	June 9, 1999	Socorro	LINEAR	·	4.4 km	MPC; JPL
20460 Robwhiteley	1999 LO_{28}	Robwhiteley	June 13, 1999	CSS	CSS	AMO +1km	2.7 km	MPC; JPL
20461 Dioretsa	1999 LD_{31}	Dioretsa	June 8, 1999	Socorro	LINEAR	damocloid · critical · unusual	14 km	MPC; JPL
20462	1999 LZ_{31}	—	June 14, 1999	Kitt Peak	Spacewatch	EOS	7.7 km	MPC; JPL
20463	1999 MC_{1}	—	June 23, 1999	Woomera	F. B. Zoltowski	·	2.7 km	MPC; JPL
20464	1999 MD_{1}	—	June 24, 1999	Woomera	F. B. Zoltowski	·	2.2 km	MPC; JPL
20465 Vervack	1999 MJ_{1}	Vervack	June 20, 1999	Anderson Mesa	LONEOS	·	3.4 km	MPC; JPL
20466	1999 MW_{1}	—	June 20, 1999	Catalina	CSS	slow	14 km	MPC; JPL
20467 Hibbitts	1999 MX_{1}	Hibbitts	June 20, 1999	Anderson Mesa	LONEOS	·	4.2 km	MPC; JPL
20468 Petercook	1999 NK_{4}	Petercook	July 13, 1999	Reedy Creek	J. Broughton	·	7.9 km	MPC; JPL
20469 Dudleymoore	1999 NQ_{4}	Dudleymoore	July 13, 1999	Reedy Creek	J. Broughton	·	4.4 km	MPC; JPL
20470 Kubica	1999 NZ_{5}	Kubica	July 13, 1999	Socorro	LINEAR	·	10 km	MPC; JPL
20471 Kueny	1999 NK_{6}	Kueny	July 13, 1999	Socorro	LINEAR	·	5.3 km	MPC; JPL
20472 Mollypettit	1999 NL_{7}	Mollypettit	July 13, 1999	Socorro	LINEAR	NYS ·	5.4 km	MPC; JPL
20473 Lainey	1999 NS_{8}	Lainey	July 13, 1999	Socorro	LINEAR	EUN	6.3 km	MPC; JPL
20474 Reasoner	1999 NV_{9}	Reasoner	July 13, 1999	Socorro	LINEAR	·	2.8 km	MPC; JPL
20475 Lauraparro	1999 NU_{11}	Lauraparro	July 13, 1999	Socorro	LINEAR	·	3.7 km	MPC; JPL
20476 Chanarich	1999 NH_{12}	Chanarich	July 13, 1999	Socorro	LINEAR	·	2.2 km	MPC; JPL
20477 Anastroda	1999 NQ_{18}	Anastroda	July 14, 1999	Socorro	LINEAR	V	2.7 km	MPC; JPL
20478 Rutenberg	1999 NJ_{20}	Rutenberg	July 14, 1999	Socorro	LINEAR	·	3.7 km	MPC; JPL
20479 Celisaucier	1999 NO_{22}	Celisaucier	July 14, 1999	Socorro	LINEAR	·	3.5 km	MPC; JPL
20480 Antonschraut	1999 NT_{31}	Antonschraut	July 14, 1999	Socorro	LINEAR	·	4.7 km	MPC; JPL
20481 Sharples	1999 NW_{37}	Sharples	July 14, 1999	Socorro	LINEAR	·	4.6 km	MPC; JPL
20482 Dustinshea	1999 NH_{40}	Dustinshea	July 14, 1999	Socorro	LINEAR	NYS	2.9 km	MPC; JPL
20483 Sinay	1999 NK_{41}	Sinay	July 14, 1999	Socorro	LINEAR	·	3.4 km	MPC; JPL
20484 Janetsong	1999 NL_{41}	Janetsong	July 14, 1999	Socorro	LINEAR	·	4.2 km	MPC; JPL
20485 Léaferellec	1999 NJ_{54}	Léaferellec	July 12, 1999	Socorro	LINEAR	EUN · slow	4.3 km	MPC; JPL
20486 Lemos	1999 NU_{56}	Lemos	July 12, 1999	Socorro	LINEAR	·	6.7 km	MPC; JPL
20487 Lhotka	1999 NJ_{62}	Lhotka	July 13, 1999	Socorro	LINEAR	·	4.6 km	MPC; JPL
20488 Pic-du-Midi	1999 OL	Pic-du-Midi	July 17, 1999	Pises	Pises	·	7.9 km	MPC; JPL
20489 Lissauer	1999 OJ_{2}	Lissauer	July 22, 1999	Socorro	LINEAR	EUN	6.9 km	MPC; JPL
20490 Longobardo	1999 OW_{2}	Longobardo	July 22, 1999	Socorro	LINEAR	·	7.8 km	MPC; JPL
20491 Ericstrege	1999 OA_{5}	Ericstrege	July 16, 1999	Socorro	LINEAR	V	2.1 km	MPC; JPL
20492 Luanaliberato	1999 OC_{5}	Luanaliberato	July 16, 1999	Socorro	LINEAR	·	5.1 km	MPC; JPL
20493 Lutzhecht	1999 OD_{5}	Lutzhecht	July 16, 1999	Socorro	LINEAR	EUN	4.9 km	MPC; JPL
20494	1999 PM_{1}	—	August 3, 1999	Siding Spring	R. H. McNaught	BRU	8.7 km	MPC; JPL
20495 Rimavská Sobota	1999 PW_{4}	Rimavská Sobota	August 15, 1999	Ondřejov	P. Pravec, P. Kušnirák	·	3.8 km	MPC; JPL
20496 Jeník	1999 QA_{2}	Jeník	August 22, 1999	Ondřejov	L. Kotková	·	5.3 km	MPC; JPL
20497 Mařenka	1999 RS	Mařenka	September 4, 1999	Ondřejov	L. Kotková	VER	9.0 km	MPC; JPL
20498	1999 RT_{1}	—	September 5, 1999	Višnjan Observatory	K. Korlević	·	5.2 km	MPC; JPL
20499	1999 RZ_{2}	—	September 6, 1999	Višnjan Observatory	K. Korlević	KOR	4.2 km	MPC; JPL
20500 Avner	1999 RP_{3}	Avner	September 4, 1999	Catalina	CSS	·	3.0 km	MPC; JPL

== 20501–20600 ==
back to top

Designation			Discovery			Properties		Ref
Permanent	Provisional	Named after	Date	Site	Discoverer(s)	Category	Diam.	Ref
20501 Luxiaoping	1999 RD_{10}	Luxiaoping	September 7, 1999	Socorro	LINEAR	·	3.2 km	MPC; JPL
20502 Madeira	1999 RG_{11}	Madeira	September 7, 1999	Socorro	LINEAR	·	14 km	MPC; JPL
20503 Adamtazi	1999 RX_{14}	Adamtazi	September 7, 1999	Socorro	LINEAR	·	6.1 km	MPC; JPL
20504 Magbanua	1999 RH_{15}	Magbanua	September 7, 1999	Socorro	LINEAR	EUN	4.2 km	MPC; JPL
20505 Makadia	1999 RE_{16}	Makadia	September 7, 1999	Socorro	LINEAR	·	11 km	MPC; JPL
20506 Mammana	1999 RO_{17}	Mammana	September 7, 1999	Socorro	LINEAR	·	6.7 km	MPC; JPL
20507 Marclaessens	1999 RU_{19}	Marclaessens	September 7, 1999	Socorro	LINEAR	·	2.8 km	MPC; JPL
20508 Marekhusárik	1999 RL_{25}	Marekhusárik	September 7, 1999	Socorro	LINEAR	PHO	5.7 km	MPC; JPL
20509 Mariavarela	1999 RL_{26}	Mariavarela	September 7, 1999	Socorro	LINEAR	HYG	9.9 km	MPC; JPL
20510 Marjoriegalinier	1999 RQ_{26}	Marjoriegalinier	September 7, 1999	Socorro	LINEAR	EMA	11 km	MPC; JPL
20511	1999 RJ_{31}	—	September 8, 1999	Višnjan Observatory	K. Korlević	·	3.5 km	MPC; JPL
20512 Rothenberg	1999 RW_{32}	Rothenberg	September 10, 1999	Drebach	~Knöfel, A.	EOS	6.7 km	MPC; JPL
20513 Lazio	1999 RC_{34}	Lazio	September 10, 1999	Campo Catino	F. Mallia, G. Masi	·	2.6 km	MPC; JPL
20514	1999 RD_{34}	—	September 7, 1999	Višnjan Observatory	K. Korlević	ANF	5.0 km	MPC; JPL
20515	1999 RO_{34}	—	September 11, 1999	Višnjan Observatory	K. Korlević	EOS	9.4 km	MPC; JPL
20516	1999 RP_{34}	—	September 11, 1999	Višnjan Observatory	K. Korlević	KOR	5.4 km	MPC; JPL
20517 Judycrystal	1999 RB_{35}	Judycrystal	September 11, 1999	Olathe	Robinson, L.	HNS	3.7 km	MPC; JPL
20518 Rendtel	1999 RC_{36}	Rendtel	September 12, 1999	Drebach	~Knöfel, A.	·	10 km	MPC; JPL
20519	1999 RH_{36}	—	September 12, 1999	Višnjan Observatory	K. Korlević	EOS	6.4 km	MPC; JPL
20520	1999 RC_{38}	—	September 13, 1999	Višnjan Observatory	K. Korlević	EUN	12 km	MPC; JPL
20521	1999 RM_{38}	—	September 13, 1999	Višnjan Observatory	K. Korlević	VER	11 km	MPC; JPL
20522 Yogeshwar	1999 RK_{40}	Yogeshwar	September 13, 1999	Drebach	~Knöfel, A.	·	3.6 km	MPC; JPL
20523	1999 RZ_{41}	—	September 13, 1999	Višnjan Observatory	K. Korlević	VER	18 km	MPC; JPL
20524 Bustersikes	1999 RJ_{42}	Bustersikes	September 13, 1999	Fountain Hills	C. W. Juels	GEF	7.1 km	MPC; JPL
20525	1999 RU_{43}	—	September 14, 1999	Višnjan Observatory	K. Korlević	·	11 km	MPC; JPL
20526 Bathompson	1999 RZ_{45}	Bathompson	September 7, 1999	Socorro	LINEAR	·	2.4 km	MPC; JPL
20527 Dajowestrich	1999 RO_{48}	Dajowestrich	September 7, 1999	Socorro	LINEAR	NYS	2.9 km	MPC; JPL
20528 Kyleyawn	1999 RL_{50}	Kyleyawn	September 7, 1999	Socorro	LINEAR	·	5.7 km	MPC; JPL
20529 Zwerling	1999 RM_{53}	Zwerling	September 7, 1999	Socorro	LINEAR	·	4.1 km	MPC; JPL
20530 Johnayres	1999 RG_{55}	Johnayres	September 7, 1999	Socorro	LINEAR	THM	6.8 km	MPC; JPL
20531 Stevebabcock	1999 RW_{57}	Stevebabcock	September 7, 1999	Socorro	LINEAR	NYS	3.6 km	MPC; JPL
20532 Benbilby	1999 RL_{64}	Benbilby	September 7, 1999	Socorro	LINEAR	·	3.6 km	MPC; JPL
20533 Irmabonham	1999 RO_{72}	Irmabonham	September 7, 1999	Socorro	LINEAR	KOR	5.0 km	MPC; JPL
20534 Bozeman	1999 RU_{74}	Bozeman	September 7, 1999	Socorro	LINEAR	·	2.4 km	MPC; JPL
20535 Marshburrows	1999 RV_{74}	Marshburrows	September 7, 1999	Socorro	LINEAR	·	3.0 km	MPC; JPL
20536 Tracicarter	1999 RF_{81}	Tracicarter	September 7, 1999	Socorro	LINEAR	·	2.5 km	MPC; JPL
20537 Sandraderosa	1999 RO_{82}	Sandraderosa	September 7, 1999	Socorro	LINEAR	V	2.5 km	MPC; JPL
20538 Masakifujimoto	1999 RN_{84}	Masakifujimoto	September 7, 1999	Socorro	LINEAR	·	3.7 km	MPC; JPL
20539 Gadberry	1999 RT_{86}	Gadberry	September 7, 1999	Socorro	LINEAR	·	4.6 km	MPC; JPL
20540 Marhalpern	1999 RV_{86}	Marhalpern	September 7, 1999	Socorro	LINEAR	PAD	6.9 km	MPC; JPL
20541 Matthewhopkins	1999 RN_{93}	Matthewhopkins	September 7, 1999	Socorro	LINEAR	·	6.9 km	MPC; JPL
20542 Maxwest	1999 RD_{94}	Maxwest	September 7, 1999	Socorro	LINEAR	·	5.3 km	MPC; JPL
20543 Michaelfauerbach	1999 RZ_{98}	Michaelfauerbach	September 7, 1999	Socorro	LINEAR	·	18 km	MPC; JPL
20544 Kimhansell	1999 RG_{100}	Kimhansell	September 8, 1999	Socorro	LINEAR	·	2.4 km	MPC; JPL
20545 Karenhowell	1999 RS_{104}	Karenhowell	September 8, 1999	Socorro	LINEAR	·	3.1 km	MPC; JPL
20546 Michaelfrühauf	1999 RA_{105}	Michaelfrühauf	September 8, 1999	Socorro	LINEAR	HYG · fast	11 km	MPC; JPL
20547 Michimani	1999 RD_{105}	Michimani	September 8, 1999	Socorro	LINEAR	HYG	11 km	MPC; JPL
20548 Milewski	1999 RM_{107}	Milewski	September 8, 1999	Socorro	LINEAR	·	9.0 km	MPC; JPL
20549 Mirelatrelia	1999 RH_{110}	Mirelatrelia	September 8, 1999	Socorro	LINEAR	EOS	7.4 km	MPC; JPL
20550 Molnar-Bufanda	1999 RX_{110}	Molnar-Bufanda	September 8, 1999	Socorro	LINEAR	·	4.4 km	MPC; JPL
20551 Monikakamińska	1999 RE_{112}	Monikakamińska	September 9, 1999	Socorro	LINEAR	·	3.0 km	MPC; JPL
20552 Moynier	1999 RU_{112}	Moynier	September 9, 1999	Socorro	LINEAR	·	6.9 km	MPC; JPL
20553 Donaldhowk	1999 RQ_{113}	Donaldhowk	September 9, 1999	Socorro	LINEAR	·	3.2 km	MPC; JPL
20554 Myriebe	1999 RW_{114}	Myriebe	September 9, 1999	Socorro	LINEAR	EMA ·	7.2 km	MPC; JPL
20555 Jennings	1999 RC_{115}	Jennings	September 9, 1999	Socorro	LINEAR	·	4.5 km	MPC; JPL
20556 Midgekimble	1999 RZ_{115}	Midgekimble	September 9, 1999	Socorro	LINEAR	·	3.7 km	MPC; JPL
20557 Davidkulka	1999 RB_{116}	Davidkulka	September 9, 1999	Socorro	LINEAR	V	4.0 km	MPC; JPL
20558 Natashaalmeida	1999 RN_{117}	Natashaalmeida	September 9, 1999	Socorro	LINEAR	GEF	5.2 km	MPC; JPL
20559 Sheridanlamp	1999 RJ_{118}	Sheridanlamp	September 9, 1999	Socorro	LINEAR	RAF	3.6 km	MPC; JPL
20560 Nežič	1999 RX_{118}	Nežič	September 9, 1999	Socorro	LINEAR	slow	11 km	MPC; JPL
20561 Noyelles	1999 RE_{120}	Noyelles	September 9, 1999	Socorro	LINEAR	·	3.0 km	MPC; JPL
20562 Oldag	1999 RV_{120}	Oldag	September 9, 1999	Socorro	LINEAR	PHO · slow	7.9 km	MPC; JPL
20563 Oliverprice	1999 RG_{121}	Oliverprice	September 9, 1999	Socorro	LINEAR	EUN	4.7 km	MPC; JPL
20564 Michaellane	1999 RT_{122}	Michaellane	September 9, 1999	Socorro	LINEAR	·	3.4 km	MPC; JPL
20565 Oliviermousis	1999 RR_{123}	Oliviermousis	September 9, 1999	Socorro	LINEAR	·	7.8 km	MPC; JPL
20566 Laurielee	1999 RV_{125}	Laurielee	September 9, 1999	Socorro	LINEAR	·	4.4 km	MPC; JPL
20567 McQuarrie	1999 RS_{129}	McQuarrie	September 9, 1999	Socorro	LINEAR	·	3.3 km	MPC; JPL
20568 Migaki	1999 RC_{130}	Migaki	September 9, 1999	Socorro	LINEAR	V	2.6 km	MPC; JPL
20569 Óscarrodríguez	1999 RP_{132}	Óscarrodríguez	September 9, 1999	Socorro	LINEAR	·	17 km	MPC; JPL
20570 Molchan	1999 RV_{133}	Molchan	September 9, 1999	Socorro	LINEAR	V	3.4 km	MPC; JPL
20571 Tiamorrison	1999 RA_{135}	Tiamorrison	September 9, 1999	Socorro	LINEAR	slow	3.1 km	MPC; JPL
20572 Celemorrow	1999 RN_{137}	Celemorrow	September 9, 1999	Socorro	LINEAR	KOR	3.8 km	MPC; JPL
20573 Garynadler	1999 RW_{137}	Garynadler	September 9, 1999	Socorro	LINEAR	WIT ·	4.1 km	MPC; JPL
20574 Ochinero	1999 RZ_{139}	Ochinero	September 9, 1999	Socorro	LINEAR	V	2.1 km	MPC; JPL
20575 Panicucci	1999 RL_{142}	Panicucci	September 9, 1999	Socorro	LINEAR	V	5.2 km	MPC; JPL
20576 Marieoertle	1999 RG_{148}	Marieoertle	September 9, 1999	Socorro	LINEAR	·	2.5 km	MPC; JPL
20577 Paolomartino	1999 RM_{148}	Paolomartino	September 9, 1999	Socorro	LINEAR	HOF	11 km	MPC; JPL
20578 Parisot	1999 RH_{149}	Parisot	September 9, 1999	Socorro	LINEAR	fast	5.1 km	MPC; JPL
20579 Pavelzigo	1999 RX_{149}	Pavelzigo	September 9, 1999	Socorro	LINEAR	EUN	5.1 km	MPC; JPL
20580 Marilpeters	1999 RG_{151}	Marilpeters	September 9, 1999	Socorro	LINEAR	NYS	3.7 km	MPC; JPL
20581 Prendergast	1999 RQ_{152}	Prendergast	September 9, 1999	Socorro	LINEAR	·	2.8 km	MPC; JPL
20582 Reichenbach	1999 RP_{154}	Reichenbach	September 9, 1999	Socorro	LINEAR	·	3.9 km	MPC; JPL
20583 Richthammer	1999 RK_{158}	Richthammer	September 9, 1999	Socorro	LINEAR	·	5.4 km	MPC; JPL
20584 Brigidsavage	1999 RP_{159}	Brigidsavage	September 9, 1999	Socorro	LINEAR	KOR	4.2 km	MPC; JPL
20585 Wentworth	1999 RG_{160}	Wentworth	September 9, 1999	Socorro	LINEAR	·	5.3 km	MPC; JPL
20586 Elizkolod	1999 RR_{160}	Elizkolod	September 9, 1999	Socorro	LINEAR	·	6.3 km	MPC; JPL
20587 Jargoldman	1999 RD_{162}	Jargoldman	September 9, 1999	Socorro	LINEAR	·	5.3 km	MPC; JPL
20588 Pavolmatlovič	1999 RM_{166}	Pavolmatlovič	September 9, 1999	Socorro	LINEAR	·	8.7 km	MPC; JPL
20589 Hennyadmoni	1999 RQ_{168}	Hennyadmoni	September 9, 1999	Socorro	LINEAR	·	2.4 km	MPC; JPL
20590 Bongiovanni	1999 RN_{172}	Bongiovanni	September 9, 1999	Socorro	LINEAR	·	5.0 km	MPC; JPL
20591 Sameergupta	1999 RC_{177}	Sameergupta	September 9, 1999	Socorro	LINEAR	·	2.5 km	MPC; JPL
20592 Payne	1999 RV_{177}	Payne	September 9, 1999	Socorro	LINEAR	VER	12 km	MPC; JPL
20593 Freilich	1999 RM_{180}	Freilich	September 9, 1999	Socorro	LINEAR	V	3.3 km	MPC; JPL
20594 Pemartin	1999 RP_{183}	Pemartin	September 9, 1999	Socorro	LINEAR	·	13 km	MPC; JPL
20595 Ryanwisnoski	1999 RT_{188}	Ryanwisnoski	September 9, 1999	Socorro	LINEAR	·	2.4 km	MPC; JPL
20596 Pfalzner	1999 RX_{188}	Pfalzner	September 9, 1999	Socorro	LINEAR	·	3.6 km	MPC; JPL
20597 Pickersgill	1999 RA_{192}	Pickersgill	September 11, 1999	Socorro	LINEAR	EUN	4.7 km	MPC; JPL
20598 Pilat-Lohinger	1999 RO_{194}	Pilat-Lohinger	September 7, 1999	Socorro	LINEAR	AGN	4.0 km	MPC; JPL
20599 Pisarčíková	1999 RD_{196}	Pisarčíková	September 8, 1999	Socorro	LINEAR	EUN	4.5 km	MPC; JPL
20600 Danieltse	1999 RC_{197}	Danieltse	September 8, 1999	Socorro	LINEAR	·	5.0 km	MPC; JPL

== 20601–20700 ==
back to top

Designation			Discovery			Properties		Ref
Permanent	Provisional	Named after	Date	Site	Discoverer(s)	Category	Diam.	Ref
20601 Qasimafghan	1999 RD_{197}	Qasimafghan	September 8, 1999	Socorro	LINEAR	·	6.8 km	MPC; JPL
20602 Qichengzhang	1999 RC_{198}	Qichengzhang	September 8, 1999	Socorro	LINEAR	·	24 km	MPC; JPL
20603 Rafaelribeiro	1999 RT_{199}	Rafaelribeiro	September 8, 1999	Socorro	LINEAR	·	7.5 km	MPC; JPL
20604 Vrishikpatil	1999 RW_{205}	Vrishikpatil	September 8, 1999	Socorro	LINEAR	·	7.0 km	MPC; JPL
20605 Rambaux	1999 RX_{209}	Rambaux	September 8, 1999	Socorro	LINEAR	EUN	4.2 km	MPC; JPL
20606 Widemann	1999 RM_{214}	Widemann	September 5, 1999	Anderson Mesa	LONEOS	·	9.2 km	MPC; JPL
20607 Vernazza	1999 RR_{219}	Vernazza	September 4, 1999	Anderson Mesa	LONEOS	·	15 km	MPC; JPL
20608 Fredmerlin	1999 RH_{224}	Fredmerlin	September 7, 1999	Anderson Mesa	LONEOS	·	2.5 km	MPC; JPL
20609	1999 RO_{225}	—	September 3, 1999	Kitt Peak	Spacewatch	KOR	3.7 km	MPC; JPL
20610 Franciswilliams	1999 RK_{235}	Franciswilliams	September 8, 1999	Catalina	CSS	·	4.3 km	MPC; JPL
20611	1999 RL_{235}	—	September 8, 1999	Catalina	CSS	·	3.3 km	MPC; JPL
20612	1999 RT_{237}	—	September 8, 1999	Catalina	CSS	·	9.7 km	MPC; JPL
20613 Chibaken	1999 RE_{240}	Chibaken	September 11, 1999	Anderson Mesa	LONEOS	EOS	6.2 km	MPC; JPL
20614 Renner	1999 SN_{3}	Renner	September 24, 1999	Socorro	LINEAR	PHO	4.4 km	MPC; JPL
20615	1999 SZ_{3}	—	September 29, 1999	Višnjan Observatory	K. Korlević	KOR	6.9 km	MPC; JPL
20616 Zeeshansayed	1999 SH_{6}	Zeeshansayed	September 30, 1999	Socorro	LINEAR	·	3.4 km	MPC; JPL
20617 Richardgreenwood	1999 SA_{7}	Richardgreenwood	September 29, 1999	Socorro	LINEAR	·	17 km	MPC; JPL
20618 Daniebutler	1999 SG_{7}	Daniebutler	September 29, 1999	Socorro	LINEAR	V	2.6 km	MPC; JPL
20619	1999 SB_{10}	—	September 30, 1999	Woomera	F. B. Zoltowski	·	3.8 km	MPC; JPL
20620	1999 SW_{10}	—	September 30, 1999	Catalina	CSS	·	4.2 km	MPC; JPL
20621	1999 TK_{11}	—	October 9, 1999	Ametlla de Mar	J. Nomen	V	4.4 km	MPC; JPL
20622	1999 TQ_{11}	—	October 8, 1999	Kleť	Kleť	HYG	12 km	MPC; JPL
20623 Davidyoung	1999 TS_{11}	Davidyoung	October 10, 1999	EverStaR	Abraham, M., Fedon, G.	EUN	6.2 km	MPC; JPL
20624 Dariozanetti	1999 TB_{12}	Dariozanetti	October 9, 1999	Gnosca	S. Sposetti	EUN	3.6 km	MPC; JPL
20625 Noto	1999 TG_{20}	Noto	October 9, 1999	Yanagida	Tsuchikawa, A.	KOR	5.1 km	MPC; JPL
20626 Rider-Stokes	1999 TH_{21}	Rider-Stokes	October 4, 1999	Socorro	LINEAR	·	3.3 km	MPC; JPL
20627	1999 TF_{38}	—	October 1, 1999	Catalina	CSS	·	3.9 km	MPC; JPL
20628	1999 TS_{40}	—	October 5, 1999	Catalina	CSS	3:2	18 km	MPC; JPL
20629 Robert	1999 TB_{90}	Robert	October 2, 1999	Socorro	LINEAR	·	5.7 km	MPC; JPL
20630	1999 TJ_{90}	—	October 2, 1999	Socorro	LINEAR	T_{j} (2.98) · 3:2	12 km	MPC; JPL
20631 Stefuller	1999 TW_{91}	Stefuller	October 2, 1999	Socorro	LINEAR	V	3.3 km	MPC; JPL
20632 Carlyrosser	1999 TC_{92}	Carlyrosser	October 2, 1999	Socorro	LINEAR	·	3.7 km	MPC; JPL
20633 Robertluther	1999 TU_{93}	Robertluther	October 2, 1999	Socorro	LINEAR	THM	6.7 km	MPC; JPL
20634 Marichardson	1999 TP_{94}	Marichardson	October 2, 1999	Socorro	LINEAR	·	2.9 km	MPC; JPL
20635 Robinandrews	1999 TV_{96}	Robinandrews	October 2, 1999	Socorro	LINEAR	·	24 km	MPC; JPL
20636 Romanhirsch	1999 TC_{97}	Romanhirsch	October 2, 1999	Socorro	LINEAR	·	4.3 km	MPC; JPL
20637 Rosemarydorsey	1999 TX_{103}	Rosemarydorsey	October 3, 1999	Socorro	LINEAR	·	3.3 km	MPC; JPL
20638 Lingchen	1999 TV_{108}	Lingchen	October 4, 1999	Socorro	LINEAR	PAD	8.1 km	MPC; JPL
20639 Michellouie	1999 TD_{109}	Michellouie	October 4, 1999	Socorro	LINEAR	·	4.0 km	MPC; JPL
20640	1999 TF_{118}	—	October 4, 1999	Socorro	LINEAR	3:2	14 km	MPC; JPL
20641 Yenuanchen	1999 TF_{121}	Yenuanchen	October 4, 1999	Socorro	LINEAR	·	6.7 km	MPC; JPL
20642 Laurajohnson	1999 TC_{124}	Laurajohnson	October 4, 1999	Socorro	LINEAR	·	7.3 km	MPC; JPL
20643 Angelicaliu	1999 TK_{142}	Angelicaliu	October 7, 1999	Socorro	LINEAR	·	5.5 km	MPC; JPL
20644 Amritdas	1999 TN_{144}	Amritdas	October 7, 1999	Socorro	LINEAR	·	4.0 km	MPC; JPL
20645 Ryderstrauss	1999 TH_{149}	Ryderstrauss	October 7, 1999	Socorro	LINEAR	EOS	8.6 km	MPC; JPL
20646 Nikhilgupta	1999 TM_{150}	Nikhilgupta	October 7, 1999	Socorro	LINEAR	·	4.2 km	MPC; JPL
20647 Ryujiokazaki	1999 TQ_{155}	Ryujiokazaki	October 7, 1999	Socorro	LINEAR	EUN	5.1 km	MPC; JPL
20648 Ryukihyodo	1999 TF_{166}	Ryukihyodo	October 10, 1999	Socorro	LINEAR	·	9.7 km	MPC; JPL
20649 Miklenov	1999 TP_{170}	Miklenov	October 10, 1999	Socorro	LINEAR	KOR	3.4 km	MPC; JPL
20650 Saillenfest	1999 TG_{173}	Saillenfest	October 10, 1999	Socorro	LINEAR	·	4.5 km	MPC; JPL
20651	1999 TE_{219}	—	October 1, 1999	Catalina	CSS	·	5.9 km	MPC; JPL
20652	1999 TY_{229}	—	October 2, 1999	Catalina	CSS	·	5.6 km	MPC; JPL
20653	1999 TN_{245}	—	October 7, 1999	Catalina	CSS	·	10 km	MPC; JPL
20654 Ivaneder	1999 TO_{247}	Ivaneder	October 8, 1999	Catalina	CSS	·	11 km	MPC; JPL
20655	1999 TT_{248}	—	October 8, 1999	Catalina	CSS	·	10 km	MPC; JPL
20656 Samuelgrant	1999 TX_{258}	Samuelgrant	October 9, 1999	Socorro	LINEAR	THM	7.9 km	MPC; JPL
20657 Alvarez-Candal	1999 TL_{261}	Alvarez-Candal	October 14, 1999	Anderson Mesa	LONEOS	·	10 km	MPC; JPL
20658 Bushmarinov	1999 TY_{270}	Bushmarinov	October 3, 1999	Socorro	LINEAR	V	2.4 km	MPC; JPL
20659	1999 UE	—	October 16, 1999	Višnjan Observatory	K. Korlević	THM	8.1 km	MPC; JPL
20660	1999 UF	—	October 16, 1999	Višnjan Observatory	K. Korlević	HYG	11 km	MPC; JPL
20661	1999 UZ	—	October 16, 1999	Višnjan Observatory	K. Korlević	THM	8.0 km	MPC; JPL
20662	1999 UC_{1}	—	October 16, 1999	Višnjan Observatory	K. Korlević	·	5.5 km	MPC; JPL
20663	1999 UU_{2}	—	October 19, 1999	Fountain Hills	C. W. Juels	·	4.0 km	MPC; JPL
20664 Senec	1999 UV_{4}	Senec	October 31, 1999	Modra	Galád, A., Tóth	SYL · CYB	15 km	MPC; JPL
20665	1999 UQ_{8}	—	October 29, 1999	Catalina	CSS	·	10 km	MPC; JPL
20666	1999 UX_{8}	—	October 29, 1999	Catalina	CSS	TEL	5.3 km	MPC; JPL
20667	1999 UM_{11}	—	October 27, 1999	Višnjan Observatory	K. Korlević	THM	8.3 km	MPC; JPL
20668	1999 UN_{11}	—	October 27, 1999	Višnjan Observatory	K. Korlević	·	5.7 km	MPC; JPL
20669	1999 UO_{13}	—	October 29, 1999	Catalina	CSS	·	7.3 km	MPC; JPL
20670	1999 UA_{46}	—	October 31, 1999	Catalina	CSS	·	12 km	MPC; JPL
20671	1999 UX_{48}	—	October 31, 1999	Catalina	CSS	ADE	6.5 km	MPC; JPL
20672	1999 UU_{50}	—	October 30, 1999	Catalina	CSS	·	10 km	MPC; JPL
20673 Janelle	1999 VW	Janelle	November 3, 1999	Farpoint	G. Bell	EOS	6.0 km	MPC; JPL
20674	1999 VT_{1}	—	November 4, 1999	Oohira	T. Urata	·	10 km	MPC; JPL
20675	1999 VK_{6}	—	November 5, 1999	Oizumi	T. Kobayashi	·	14 km	MPC; JPL
20676	1999 VA_{7}	—	November 8, 1999	Fountain Hills	C. W. Juels	·	18 km	MPC; JPL
20677	1999 VT_{7}	—	November 7, 1999	Višnjan Observatory	K. Korlević	MAR	6.3 km	MPC; JPL
20678	1999 VE_{9}	—	November 8, 1999	Višnjan Observatory	K. Korlević	·	3.2 km	MPC; JPL
20679	1999 VU_{9}	—	November 9, 1999	Fountain Hills	C. W. Juels	URS	17 km	MPC; JPL
20680	1999 VX_{9}	—	November 9, 1999	Fountain Hills	C. W. Juels	EUN	5.8 km	MPC; JPL
20681	1999 VH_{10}	—	November 9, 1999	Oizumi	T. Kobayashi	·	4.9 km	MPC; JPL
20682	1999 VP_{23}	—	November 14, 1999	Fountain Hills	C. W. Juels	EUN	6.6 km	MPC; JPL
20683	1999 VT_{44}	—	November 4, 1999	Catalina	CSS	·	3.2 km	MPC; JPL
20684	1999 VW_{44}	—	November 4, 1999	Catalina	CSS	GEF	4.7 km	MPC; JPL
20685 Sánchez-Cano	1999 VX_{48}	Sánchez-Cano	November 3, 1999	Socorro	LINEAR	·	4.7 km	MPC; JPL
20686 Thottumkara	1999 VX_{54}	Thottumkara	November 4, 1999	Socorro	LINEAR	·	3.7 km	MPC; JPL
20687 Saletore	1999 VQ_{60}	Saletore	November 4, 1999	Socorro	LINEAR	·	3.8 km	MPC; JPL
20688 Sandroricardo	1999 VR_{62}	Sandroricardo	November 4, 1999	Socorro	LINEAR	·	8.4 km	MPC; JPL
20689 Zhuyuanchen	1999 VF_{63}	Zhuyuanchen	November 4, 1999	Socorro	LINEAR	GEF	4.2 km	MPC; JPL
20690 Crivello	1999 VY_{66}	Crivello	November 4, 1999	Socorro	LINEAR	KOR	3.4 km	MPC; JPL
20691	1999 VY_{72}	—	November 11, 1999	Siding Spring	R. H. McNaught	·	8.0 km	MPC; JPL
20692	1999 VX_{73}	—	November 1, 1999	Kitt Peak	Spacewatch	THM	11 km	MPC; JPL
20693 Ramondiaz	1999 VV_{81}	Ramondiaz	November 5, 1999	Socorro	LINEAR	THM	7.7 km	MPC; JPL
20694	1999 VT_{82}	—	November 1, 1999	Kitt Peak	Spacewatch	·	3.4 km	MPC; JPL
20695 Santiagoiglesias	1999 VM_{92}	Santiagoiglesias	November 9, 1999	Socorro	LINEAR	HYG	8.7 km	MPC; JPL
20696 Torresduarte	1999 VJ_{95}	Torresduarte	November 9, 1999	Socorro	LINEAR	THM	6.7 km	MPC; JPL
20697	1999 VK_{115}	—	November 9, 1999	Catalina	CSS	·	5.1 km	MPC; JPL
20698	1999 VE_{127}	—	November 9, 1999	Kitt Peak	Spacewatch	·	9.2 km	MPC; JPL
20699	1999 VJ_{144}	—	November 11, 1999	Catalina	CSS	RAF	5.3 km	MPC; JPL
20700 Saraheanderson	1999 VG_{145}	Saraheanderson	November 8, 1999	Socorro	LINEAR	MAR	3.6 km	MPC; JPL

== 20701–20800 ==
back to top

Designation			Discovery			Properties		Ref
Permanent	Provisional	Named after	Date	Site	Discoverer(s)	Category	Diam.	Ref
20701 Sébastiencharnoz	1999 VL_{179}	Sébastiencharnoz	November 6, 1999	Socorro	LINEAR	·	13 km	MPC; JPL
20702	1999 VF_{195}	—	November 3, 1999	Catalina	CSS	·	9.7 km	MPC; JPL
20703	1999 VC_{203}	—	November 8, 1999	Catalina	CSS	·	4.2 km	MPC; JPL
20704	1999 WH	—	November 16, 1999	Oizumi	T. Kobayashi	EOS	12 km	MPC; JPL
20705	1999 WH_{3}	—	November 18, 1999	Oizumi	T. Kobayashi	·	14 km	MPC; JPL
20706	1999 WY_{3}	—	November 28, 1999	Oizumi	T. Kobayashi	·	3.8 km	MPC; JPL
20707	1999 WW_{4}	—	November 28, 1999	Oizumi	T. Kobayashi	·	24 km	MPC; JPL
20708	1999 XH_{1}	—	December 2, 1999	Oizumi	T. Kobayashi	EOS	9.7 km	MPC; JPL
20709	1999 XM_{8}	—	December 2, 1999	Kvistaberg	Uppsala-DLR Asteroid Survey	EUN	4.1 km	MPC; JPL
20710	1999 XP_{10}	—	December 5, 1999	Catalina	CSS	EOS	6.7 km	MPC; JPL
20711 Seijisugita	1999 XF_{12}	Seijisugita	December 5, 1999	Socorro	LINEAR	·	6.9 km	MPC; JPL
20712 Shashiganesh	1999 XF_{13}	Shashiganesh	December 5, 1999	Socorro	LINEAR	EUN	5.9 km	MPC; JPL
20713 Sheward	1999 XA_{32}	Sheward	December 6, 1999	Socorro	LINEAR	·	21 km	MPC; JPL
20714	1999 XS_{36}	—	December 7, 1999	Fountain Hills	C. W. Juels	EOS	8.8 km	MPC; JPL
20715 Shijianchun	1999 XB_{44}	Shijianchun	December 7, 1999	Socorro	LINEAR	·	7.2 km	MPC; JPL
20716	1999 XG_{91}	—	December 7, 1999	Socorro	LINEAR	L4	26 km	MPC; JPL
20717 Shogotachibana	1999 XG_{93}	Shogotachibana	December 7, 1999	Socorro	LINEAR	·	7.0 km	MPC; JPL
20718 Šilha	1999 XZ_{97}	Šilha	December 7, 1999	Socorro	LINEAR	CYB	23 km	MPC; JPL
20719 Velasco	1999 XL_{99}	Velasco	December 7, 1999	Socorro	LINEAR	·	3.7 km	MPC; JPL
20720	1999 XP_{101}	—	December 7, 1999	Socorro	LINEAR	L4	34 km	MPC; JPL
20721	1999 XA_{105}	—	December 9, 1999	Fountain Hills	C. W. Juels	EOS	11 km	MPC; JPL
20722 Aaronclevenson	1999 XZ_{109}	Aaronclevenson	December 4, 1999	Catalina	CSS	EOS	9.6 km	MPC; JPL
20723 Siltala	1999 XH_{113}	Siltala	December 11, 1999	Socorro	LINEAR	EUN	5.7 km	MPC; JPL
20724	1999 XO_{116}	—	December 5, 1999	Catalina	CSS	·	8.0 km	MPC; JPL
20725 Juliuscsotonyi	1999 XP_{120}	Juliuscsotonyi	December 5, 1999	Catalina	CSS	·	10 km	MPC; JPL
20726	1999 XE_{122}	—	December 7, 1999	Catalina	CSS	·	5.5 km	MPC; JPL
20727	1999 XV_{123}	—	December 7, 1999	Catalina	CSS	EOS	6.8 km	MPC; JPL
20728	1999 XD_{143}	—	December 14, 1999	Fountain Hills	C. W. Juels	·	3.3 km	MPC; JPL
20729 Opheltius	1999 XS_{143}	Opheltius	December 15, 1999	Fountain Hills	C. W. Juels	L4	51 km	MPC; JPL
20730 Jorgecarvano	1999 XC_{151}	Jorgecarvano	December 9, 1999	Anderson Mesa	LONEOS	·	4.8 km	MPC; JPL
20731 Mothédiniz	1999 XH_{151}	Mothédiniz	December 9, 1999	Anderson Mesa	LONEOS	EOS	7.4 km	MPC; JPL
20732 Snedeker	1999 XB_{167}	Snedeker	December 10, 1999	Socorro	LINEAR	·	7.5 km	MPC; JPL
20733 Sophiejacquinod	1999 XE_{168}	Sophiejacquinod	December 10, 1999	Socorro	LINEAR	·	20 km	MPC; JPL
20734 Sriramsaran	1999 XA_{169}	Sriramsaran	December 10, 1999	Socorro	LINEAR	·	24 km	MPC; JPL
20735 Stetzler	1999 XU_{169}	Stetzler	December 10, 1999	Socorro	LINEAR	·	10 km	MPC; JPL
20736 Sultana	1999 XV_{170}	Sultana	December 10, 1999	Socorro	LINEAR	·	15 km	MPC; JPL
20737 Sungkicho	1999 XJ_{189}	Sungkicho	December 12, 1999	Socorro	LINEAR	EOS	7.4 km	MPC; JPL
20738	1999 XG_{191}	—	December 12, 1999	Socorro	LINEAR	L4	30 km	MPC; JPL
20739	1999 XM_{193}	—	December 12, 1999	Socorro	LINEAR	L4	27 km	MPC; JPL
20740 Sémery	1999 XB_{228}	Sémery	December 13, 1999	Anderson Mesa	LONEOS	HYG	13 km	MPC; JPL
20741 Jeanmichelreess	1999 XA_{230}	Jeanmichelreess	December 7, 1999	Anderson Mesa	LONEOS	·	14 km	MPC; JPL
20742	1999 XJ_{261}	—	December 14, 1999	Catalina	CSS	HNS	4.5 km	MPC; JPL
20743 Sunhojin	2000 AR_{6}	Sunhojin	January 2, 2000	Socorro	LINEAR	·	21 km	MPC; JPL
20744 Susannewampfler	2000 AO_{151}	Susannewampfler	January 8, 2000	Socorro	LINEAR	GEF · slow	6.1 km	MPC; JPL
20745 Sylvainlodiot	2000 AS_{185}	Sylvainlodiot	January 8, 2000	Socorro	LINEAR	EUN	7.0 km	MPC; JPL
20746 Tadashi	2000 AL_{186}	Tadashi	January 8, 2000	Socorro	LINEAR	·	4.3 km	MPC; JPL
20747 Tanialepivert	2000 AM_{186}	Tanialepivert	January 8, 2000	Socorro	LINEAR	EUN	7.2 km	MPC; JPL
20748 Thamirissantana	2000 AP_{186}	Thamirissantana	January 8, 2000	Socorro	LINEAR	EOS	7.2 km	MPC; JPL
20749 Tiscareno	2000 AD_{199}	Tiscareno	January 9, 2000	Socorro	LINEAR	PHO	6.4 km	MPC; JPL
20750 Tomášpaulech	2000 AF_{199}	Tomášpaulech	January 9, 2000	Socorro	LINEAR	·	7.8 km	MPC; JPL
20751 Tomnordheim	2000 AA_{200}	Tomnordheim	January 9, 2000	Socorro	LINEAR	·	15 km	MPC; JPL
20752 Topputo	2000 AP_{200}	Topputo	January 9, 2000	Socorro	LINEAR	·	7.7 km	MPC; JPL
20753	2000 AW_{211}	—	January 5, 2000	Kitt Peak	Spacewatch	EUN	5.4 km	MPC; JPL
20754 Urbaník	2000 AD_{244}	Urbaník	January 8, 2000	Socorro	LINEAR	·	9.2 km	MPC; JPL
20755 Valériegodard	2000 BX_{6}	Valériegodard	January 27, 2000	Socorro	LINEAR	·	15 km	MPC; JPL
20756	2000 BC_{19}	—	January 27, 2000	Kvistaberg	Uppsala-DLR Asteroid Survey	(12739)	5.1 km	MPC; JPL
20757 Veerlesterken	2000 CV_{52}	Veerlesterken	February 2, 2000	Socorro	LINEAR	EUN	4.4 km	MPC; JPL
20758 Veras	2000 CS_{94}	Veras	February 8, 2000	Socorro	LINEAR	EUN	6.0 km	MPC; JPL
20759 Vienne	2000 CX_{96}	Vienne	February 6, 2000	Socorro	LINEAR	EUN	5.1 km	MPC; JPL
20760 Chanmatchun	2000 DR_{8}	Chanmatchun	February 27, 2000	Rock Finder	W. K. Y. Yeung	·	3.6 km	MPC; JPL
20761	2000 EA_{8}	—	March 5, 2000	High Point	D. K. Chesney	·	4.7 km	MPC; JPL
20762 Wargnier	2000 EE_{36}	Wargnier	March 4, 2000	Socorro	LINEAR	·	24 km	MPC; JPL
20763	2000 FQ_{9}	—	March 31, 2000	Kvistaberg	Uppsala-DLR Asteroid Survey	·	2.6 km	MPC; JPL
20764 Witasse	2000 FE_{38}	Witasse	March 29, 2000	Socorro	LINEAR	·	7.9 km	MPC; JPL
20765 Yifeijiao	2000 JC_{40}	Yifeijiao	May 7, 2000	Socorro	LINEAR	MAR	6.7 km	MPC; JPL
20766 Yoonsoobach	2000 PK_{11}	Yoonsoobach	August 1, 2000	Socorro	LINEAR	·	4.3 km	MPC; JPL
20767 Younkiljung	2000 PN_{24}	Younkiljung	August 2, 2000	Socorro	LINEAR	EUN	6.1 km	MPC; JPL
20768 Langberg	2000 QO_{54}	Langberg	August 25, 2000	Socorro	LINEAR	NYS	4.8 km	MPC; JPL
20769 Yücelkılıç	2000 QM_{65}	Yücelkılıç	August 28, 2000	Socorro	LINEAR	·	3.4 km	MPC; JPL
20770 Yumoto	2000 QT_{123}	Yumoto	August 25, 2000	Socorro	LINEAR	·	2.3 km	MPC; JPL
20771 Yurimoto	2000 QY_{150}	Yurimoto	August 25, 2000	Socorro	LINEAR	·	9.1 km	MPC; JPL
20772 Brittajones	2000 QL_{182}	Brittajones	August 31, 2000	Socorro	LINEAR	·	4.0 km	MPC; JPL
20773 Aneeshvenkat	2000 QS_{208}	Aneeshvenkat	August 31, 2000	Socorro	LINEAR	·	8.9 km	MPC; JPL
20774 Zender	2000 RP_{3}	Zender	September 1, 2000	Socorro	LINEAR	KOR	6.5 km	MPC; JPL
20775 Zhaohaibin	2000 RU_{9}	Zhaohaibin	September 1, 2000	Socorro	LINEAR	·	4.1 km	MPC; JPL
20776 Juliekrugler	2000 RG_{10}	Juliekrugler	September 1, 2000	Socorro	LINEAR	·	4.3 km	MPC; JPL
20777 Zhouwenhan	2000 RX_{10}	Zhouwenhan	September 1, 2000	Socorro	LINEAR	·	7.1 km	MPC; JPL
20778 Wangchaohao	2000 RD_{11}	Wangchaohao	September 1, 2000	Socorro	LINEAR	·	4.1 km	MPC; JPL
20779 Xiajunchao	2000 RN_{11}	Xiajunchao	September 1, 2000	Socorro	LINEAR	·	2.4 km	MPC; JPL
20780 Chanyikhei	2000 RO_{11}	Chanyikhei	September 1, 2000	Socorro	LINEAR	(5)	4.5 km	MPC; JPL
20781 Znášik	2000 RX_{38}	Znášik	September 5, 2000	Socorro	LINEAR	·	2.4 km	MPC; JPL
20782 Markcroce	2000 RZ_{52}	Markcroce	September 4, 2000	Socorro	LINEAR	·	4.5 km	MPC; JPL
20783 Zurigray	2000 RK_{55}	Zurigray	September 3, 2000	Socorro	LINEAR	·	4.8 km	MPC; JPL
20784 Trevorpowers	2000 RN_{56}	Trevorpowers	September 6, 2000	Socorro	LINEAR	·	3.6 km	MPC; JPL
20785 Mitalithakor	2000 RO_{60}	Mitalithakor	September 3, 2000	Socorro	LINEAR	·	4.6 km	MPC; JPL
20786 San Sebastián	2000 RG_{62}	San Sebastián	September 1, 2000	Socorro	LINEAR	·	3.3 km	MPC; JPL
20787 Mitchfourman	2000 RZ_{71}	Mitchfourman	September 2, 2000	Socorro	LINEAR	·	3.1 km	MPC; JPL
20788 Le Montagner	2000 SB_{29}	Le Montagner	September 23, 2000	Socorro	LINEAR	EUN	5.1 km	MPC; JPL
20789 Hughgrant	2000 SU_{44}	Hughgrant	September 28, 2000	Fountain Hills	C. W. Juels	·	5.3 km	MPC; JPL
20790	2000 SE_{45}	—	September 26, 2000	Socorro	LINEAR	AMO +1km	1.7 km	MPC; JPL
20791 de Kleer	2000 SH_{60}	de Kleer	September 24, 2000	Socorro	LINEAR	·	3.7 km	MPC; JPL
20792 De Cicco	2000 SH_{88}	De Cicco	September 24, 2000	Socorro	LINEAR	·	6.7 km	MPC; JPL
20793 Goldinaaron	2000 SF_{118}	Goldinaaron	September 24, 2000	Socorro	LINEAR	·	3.8 km	MPC; JPL
20794 Ryanolson	2000 SD_{161}	Ryanolson	September 27, 2000	Socorro	LINEAR	(2076)	2.2 km	MPC; JPL
20795	2000 SE_{161}	—	September 27, 2000	Socorro	LINEAR	NYS	4.3 km	MPC; JPL
20796 Philipmunoz	2000 SN_{169}	Philipmunoz	September 24, 2000	Socorro	LINEAR	slow	4.2 km	MPC; JPL
20797	2000 SD_{172}	—	September 27, 2000	Socorro	LINEAR	EUN	7.5 km	MPC; JPL
20798 Verlinden	2000 SH_{172}	Verlinden	September 27, 2000	Socorro	LINEAR	V	2.9 km	MPC; JPL
20799 Ashishbakshi	2000 SU_{172}	Ashishbakshi	September 27, 2000	Socorro	LINEAR	·	10 km	MPC; JPL
20800	2000 SV_{172}	—	September 27, 2000	Socorro	LINEAR	·	4.0 km	MPC; JPL

== 20801–20900 ==
back to top

Designation			Discovery			Properties		Ref
Permanent	Provisional	Named after	Date	Site	Discoverer(s)	Category	Diam.	Ref
20801	2000 SC_{179}	—	September 28, 2000	Socorro	LINEAR	·	4.2 km	MPC; JPL
20802	2000 SR_{179}	—	September 28, 2000	Socorro	LINEAR	(5)	10 km	MPC; JPL
20803	2000 SK_{188}	—	September 21, 2000	Haleakala	NEAT	(1298)	9.9 km	MPC; JPL
20804 Etter	2000 SW_{209}	Etter	September 25, 2000	Socorro	LINEAR	·	7.5 km	MPC; JPL
20805	2000 SC_{220}	—	September 26, 2000	Socorro	LINEAR	EUN	6.3 km	MPC; JPL
20806	2000 SW_{220}	—	September 26, 2000	Socorro	LINEAR	·	12 km	MPC; JPL
20807	2000 SY_{220}	—	September 26, 2000	Socorro	LINEAR	EOS · fast	8.0 km	MPC; JPL
20808	2000 SR_{243}	—	September 24, 2000	Socorro	LINEAR	·	9.3 km	MPC; JPL
20809 Eshinjolly	2000 SW_{259}	Eshinjolly	September 24, 2000	Socorro	LINEAR	·	3.4 km	MPC; JPL
20810	2000 SE_{266}	—	September 26, 2000	Socorro	LINEAR	·	10 km	MPC; JPL
20811	2000 ST_{266}	—	September 26, 2000	Socorro	LINEAR	EUN	4.5 km	MPC; JPL
20812 Shannonbabb	2000 SL_{269}	Shannonbabb	September 27, 2000	Socorro	LINEAR	·	7.6 km	MPC; JPL
20813 Aakashshah	2000 SB_{274}	Aakashshah	September 28, 2000	Socorro	LINEAR	·	4.4 km	MPC; JPL
20814 Laurajones	2000 SW_{292}	Laurajones	September 27, 2000	Socorro	LINEAR	EOS ·	6.2 km	MPC; JPL
20815	2000 SZ_{318}	—	September 26, 2000	Socorro	LINEAR	·	4.2 km	MPC; JPL
20816	2000 SQ_{319}	—	September 26, 2000	Socorro	LINEAR	EUN	6.7 km	MPC; JPL
20817 Liuxiaofeng	2000 TT_{50}	Liuxiaofeng	October 1, 2000	Socorro	LINEAR	GEF	4.0 km	MPC; JPL
20818 Karmadiraju	2000 TQ_{54}	Karmadiraju	October 1, 2000	Socorro	LINEAR	·	7.6 km	MPC; JPL
20819	2000 TX_{55}	—	October 1, 2000	Socorro	LINEAR	EOS	6.3 km	MPC; JPL
20820	2000 UZ_{3}	—	October 24, 2000	Socorro	LINEAR	·	13 km	MPC; JPL
20821 Balasridhar	2000 UT_{5}	Balasridhar	October 24, 2000	Socorro	LINEAR	V	1.9 km	MPC; JPL
20822 Lintingnien	2000 UK_{7}	Lintingnien	October 24, 2000	Socorro	LINEAR	·	4.7 km	MPC; JPL
20823 Liutingchun	2000 UZ_{7}	Liutingchun	October 24, 2000	Socorro	LINEAR	HYG	7.2 km	MPC; JPL
20824	2000 UX_{9}	—	October 24, 2000	Socorro	LINEAR	·	2.1 km	MPC; JPL
20825	2000 UN_{11}	—	October 26, 2000	Fountain Hills	C. W. Juels	·	15 km	MPC; JPL
20826	2000 UV_{13}	—	October 21, 2000	Bisei SG Center	BATTeRS	APO +1km	3.7 km	MPC; JPL
20827	2000 UY_{25}	—	October 24, 2000	Socorro	LINEAR	·	8.5 km	MPC; JPL
20828 Linchen	2000 UO_{27}	Linchen	October 24, 2000	Socorro	LINEAR	V · slow	3.7 km	MPC; JPL
20829	2000 UR_{27}	—	October 24, 2000	Socorro	LINEAR	GEF	4.3 km	MPC; JPL
20830 Luyajia	2000 UG_{45}	Luyajia	October 24, 2000	Socorro	LINEAR	KOR	4.6 km	MPC; JPL
20831 Zhangyi	2000 UM_{47}	Zhangyi	October 24, 2000	Socorro	LINEAR	·	1.8 km	MPC; JPL
20832 Santhikodali	2000 UQ_{47}	Santhikodali	October 24, 2000	Socorro	LINEAR	slow	8.5 km	MPC; JPL
20833	2000 US_{47}	—	October 24, 2000	Socorro	LINEAR	NYS	4.2 km	MPC; JPL
20834 Allihewlett	2000 UM_{48}	Allihewlett	October 24, 2000	Socorro	LINEAR	·	2.8 km	MPC; JPL
20835 Eliseadcock	2000 UY_{49}	Eliseadcock	October 24, 2000	Socorro	LINEAR	·	4.1 km	MPC; JPL
20836 Marilytedja	2000 UE_{51}	Marilytedja	October 24, 2000	Socorro	LINEAR	·	3.5 km	MPC; JPL
20837 Ramanlal	2000 UX_{52}	Ramanlal	October 24, 2000	Socorro	LINEAR	KOR	3.9 km	MPC; JPL
20838	2000 UY_{53}	—	October 24, 2000	Socorro	LINEAR	·	8.1 km	MPC; JPL
20839 Bretharrison	2000 US_{55}	Bretharrison	October 24, 2000	Socorro	LINEAR	·	3.0 km	MPC; JPL
20840 Borishanin	2000 UF_{58}	Borishanin	October 25, 2000	Socorro	LINEAR	·	11 km	MPC; JPL
20841	2000 UM_{69}	—	October 25, 2000	Socorro	LINEAR	·	10 km	MPC; JPL
20842	2000 UG_{75}	—	October 31, 2000	Socorro	LINEAR	·	9.5 km	MPC; JPL
20843 Kuotzuhao	2000 UZ_{78}	Kuotzuhao	October 24, 2000	Socorro	LINEAR	NYS ·	6.5 km	MPC; JPL
20844	2000 UK_{97}	—	October 25, 2000	Socorro	LINEAR	·	4.5 km	MPC; JPL
20845	2000 UY_{102}	—	October 25, 2000	Socorro	LINEAR	EOS	9.5 km	MPC; JPL
20846 Liyulin	2000 US_{103}	Liyulin	October 25, 2000	Socorro	LINEAR	·	3.6 km	MPC; JPL
20847	2000 UW_{104}	—	October 27, 2000	Socorro	LINEAR	GEF	5.8 km	MPC; JPL
20848	2000 UA_{105}	—	October 27, 2000	Socorro	LINEAR	·	9.8 km	MPC; JPL
20849	2000 VJ_{1}	—	November 1, 2000	Socorro	LINEAR	·	4.6 km	MPC; JPL
20850 Gaglani	2000 VF_{2}	Gaglani	November 1, 2000	Socorro	LINEAR	·	4.6 km	MPC; JPL
20851 Ramachandran	2000 VA_{8}	Ramachandran	November 1, 2000	Socorro	LINEAR	·	4.9 km	MPC; JPL
20852 Allilandstrom	2000 VY_{12}	Allilandstrom	November 1, 2000	Socorro	LINEAR	·	2.5 km	MPC; JPL
20853 Yunxiangchu	2000 VQ_{13}	Yunxiangchu	November 1, 2000	Socorro	LINEAR	·	2.4 km	MPC; JPL
20854 Tetruashvily	2000 VH_{27}	Tetruashvily	November 1, 2000	Socorro	LINEAR	·	6.0 km	MPC; JPL
20855 Arifawan	2000 VV_{27}	Arifawan	November 1, 2000	Socorro	LINEAR	·	2.9 km	MPC; JPL
20856 Hamzabari	2000 VT_{28}	Hamzabari	November 1, 2000	Socorro	LINEAR	V	3.1 km	MPC; JPL
20857 Richardromeo	2000 VA_{30}	Richardromeo	November 1, 2000	Socorro	LINEAR	·	2.8 km	MPC; JPL
20858 Cuirongfeng	2000 VM_{31}	Cuirongfeng	November 1, 2000	Socorro	LINEAR	·	3.5 km	MPC; JPL
20859	2000 VT_{31}	—	November 1, 2000	Socorro	LINEAR	·	7.2 km	MPC; JPL
20860	2000 VS_{34}	—	November 1, 2000	Socorro	LINEAR	·	3.2 km	MPC; JPL
20861 Lesliebeh	2000 VX_{34}	Lesliebeh	November 1, 2000	Socorro	LINEAR	·	3.7 km	MPC; JPL
20862 Jenngoedhart	2000 VY_{34}	Jenngoedhart	November 1, 2000	Socorro	LINEAR	slow	3.7 km	MPC; JPL
20863 Jamescronk	2000 VW_{35}	Jamescronk	November 1, 2000	Socorro	LINEAR	(1338) (FLO)	3.8 km	MPC; JPL
20864	2000 VF_{36}	—	November 1, 2000	Socorro	LINEAR	EUN	4.6 km	MPC; JPL
20865	2000 VL_{36}	—	November 1, 2000	Socorro	LINEAR	EUN	5.5 km	MPC; JPL
20866	2000 VP_{37}	—	November 1, 2000	Socorro	LINEAR	HNS	8.5 km	MPC; JPL
20867	2000 VT_{37}	—	November 1, 2000	Socorro	LINEAR	EUN	6.5 km	MPC; JPL
20868	2000 VR_{39}	—	November 1, 2000	Socorro	LINEAR	·	9.5 km	MPC; JPL
20869	2000 VK_{45}	—	November 1, 2000	Socorro	LINEAR	PHO	8.3 km	MPC; JPL
20870 Kaningher	2000 VC_{48}	Kaningher	November 2, 2000	Socorro	LINEAR	KOR	3.2 km	MPC; JPL
20871	2000 VJ_{48}	—	November 2, 2000	Socorro	LINEAR	NYS	2.2 km	MPC; JPL
20872	2000 VV_{48}	—	November 2, 2000	Socorro	LINEAR	·	2.3 km	MPC; JPL
20873 Evanfrank	2000 VH_{49}	Evanfrank	November 2, 2000	Socorro	LINEAR	·	5.6 km	MPC; JPL
20874 MacGregor	2000 VL_{49}	MacGregor	November 2, 2000	Socorro	LINEAR	KOR	4.3 km	MPC; JPL
20875	2000 VU_{49}	—	November 2, 2000	Socorro	LINEAR	slow	7.9 km	MPC; JPL
20876	2000 VW_{49}	—	November 2, 2000	Socorro	LINEAR	NYS	3.5 km	MPC; JPL
20877	2000 VD_{50}	—	November 2, 2000	Socorro	LINEAR	NYS	3.5 km	MPC; JPL
20878 Uwetreske	2000 VH_{50}	Uwetreske	November 2, 2000	Socorro	LINEAR	·	3.6 km	MPC; JPL
20879 Chengyuhsuan	2000 VJ_{55}	Chengyuhsuan	November 3, 2000	Socorro	LINEAR	·	2.2 km	MPC; JPL
20880 Yiyideng	2000 VE_{57}	Yiyideng	November 3, 2000	Socorro	LINEAR	·	3.6 km	MPC; JPL
20881	2000 VG_{57}	—	November 3, 2000	Socorro	LINEAR	·	2.2 km	MPC; JPL
20882 Paulsánchez	2000 VH_{57}	Paulsánchez	November 3, 2000	Socorro	LINEAR	moon	5.1 km	MPC; JPL
20883 Gervais	2000 VD_{58}	Gervais	November 3, 2000	Socorro	LINEAR	·	3.0 km	MPC; JPL
20884	2000 VA_{59}	—	November 1, 2000	Socorro	LINEAR	KOR	4.9 km	MPC; JPL
20885	2000 WD_{2}	—	November 18, 2000	Fountain Hills	C. W. Juels	·	6.7 km	MPC; JPL
20886	2000 WE_{2}	—	November 18, 2000	Fountain Hills	C. W. Juels	·	5.9 km	MPC; JPL
20887 Ngwaikin	2000 WP_{2}	Ngwaikin	November 18, 2000	Desert Beaver	W. K. Y. Yeung	·	2.9 km	MPC; JPL
20888 Siyueguo	2000 WB_{14}	Siyueguo	November 20, 2000	Socorro	LINEAR	·	4.2 km	MPC; JPL
20889	2000 WB_{15}	—	November 20, 2000	Socorro	LINEAR	·	2.5 km	MPC; JPL
20890	2000 WN_{19}	—	November 25, 2000	Fountain Hills	C. W. Juels	GEF	3.4 km	MPC; JPL
20891	2000 WN_{28}	—	November 23, 2000	Haleakala	NEAT	·	13 km	MPC; JPL
20892 MacChnoic	2000 WE_{75}	MacChnoic	November 20, 2000	Socorro	LINEAR	·	3.3 km	MPC; JPL
20893 Rosymccloskey	2000 WJ_{75}	Rosymccloskey	November 20, 2000	Socorro	LINEAR	·	2.6 km	MPC; JPL
20894 Krumeich	2000 WP_{93}	Krumeich	November 21, 2000	Socorro	LINEAR	·	5.0 km	MPC; JPL
20895	2000 WU_{106}	—	November 20, 2000	Socorro	LINEAR	·	3.6 km	MPC; JPL
20896 Tiphene	2000 WW_{141}	Tiphene	November 20, 2000	Anderson Mesa	LONEOS	EUN	6.8 km	MPC; JPL
20897 Deborahdomingue	2000 WR_{142}	Deborahdomingue	November 20, 2000	Anderson Mesa	LONEOS	·	6.0 km	MPC; JPL
20898 Fountainhills	2000 WE_{147}	Fountainhills	November 30, 2000	Fountain Hills	C. W. Juels	T_{j} (2.35)	37 km	MPC; JPL
20899	2000 XB_{3}	—	December 1, 2000	Socorro	LINEAR	slow	12 km	MPC; JPL
20900	2000 XW_{4}	—	December 1, 2000	Socorro	LINEAR	EOS · slow	6.5 km	MPC; JPL

== 20901–21000 ==
back to top

Designation			Discovery			Properties		Ref
Permanent	Provisional	Named after	Date	Site	Discoverer(s)	Category	Diam.	Ref
20901 Mattmuehler	2000 XO_{6}	Mattmuehler	December 1, 2000	Socorro	LINEAR	V	2.8 km	MPC; JPL
20902 Kylebeighle	2000 XY_{6}	Kylebeighle	December 1, 2000	Socorro	LINEAR	·	4.6 km	MPC; JPL
20903	2000 XH_{9}	—	December 1, 2000	Socorro	LINEAR	EUN	4.2 km	MPC; JPL
20904	2190 P-L	—	September 24, 1960	Palomar	C. J. van Houten, I. van Houten-Groeneveld, T. Gehrels	·	6.0 km	MPC; JPL
20905	2581 P-L	—	September 24, 1960	Palomar	C. J. van Houten, I. van Houten-Groeneveld, T. Gehrels	KOR	3.4 km	MPC; JPL
20906	2727 P-L	—	September 24, 1960	Palomar	C. J. van Houten, I. van Houten-Groeneveld, T. Gehrels	·	2.6 km	MPC; JPL
20907	2762 P-L	—	September 24, 1960	Palomar	C. J. van Houten, I. van Houten-Groeneveld, T. Gehrels	·	6.7 km	MPC; JPL
20908	2819 P-L	—	September 24, 1960	Palomar	C. J. van Houten, I. van Houten-Groeneveld, T. Gehrels	KOR	3.4 km	MPC; JPL
20909	4026 P-L	—	September 24, 1960	Palomar	C. J. van Houten, I. van Houten-Groeneveld, T. Gehrels	EUN	6.0 km	MPC; JPL
20910	4060 P-L	—	September 24, 1960	Palomar	C. J. van Houten, I. van Houten-Groeneveld, T. Gehrels	·	5.4 km	MPC; JPL
20911	4083 P-L	—	September 24, 1960	Palomar	C. J. van Houten, I. van Houten-Groeneveld, T. Gehrels	·	4.2 km	MPC; JPL
20912	4129 P-L	—	September 24, 1960	Palomar	C. J. van Houten, I. van Houten-Groeneveld, T. Gehrels	·	2.4 km	MPC; JPL
20913	4214 P-L	—	September 24, 1960	Palomar	C. J. van Houten, I. van Houten-Groeneveld, T. Gehrels	·	7.5 km	MPC; JPL
20914	4215 P-L	—	September 24, 1960	Palomar	C. J. van Houten, I. van Houten-Groeneveld, T. Gehrels	·	1.6 km	MPC; JPL
20915	4302 P-L	—	September 24, 1960	Palomar	C. J. van Houten, I. van Houten-Groeneveld, T. Gehrels	·	8.2 km	MPC; JPL
20916	4628 P-L	—	September 24, 1960	Palomar	C. J. van Houten, I. van Houten-Groeneveld, T. Gehrels	·	7.6 km	MPC; JPL
20917	5016 P-L	—	October 22, 1960	Palomar	C. J. van Houten, I. van Houten-Groeneveld, T. Gehrels	·	2.4 km	MPC; JPL
20918	6539 P-L	—	September 24, 1960	Palomar	C. J. van Houten, I. van Houten-Groeneveld, T. Gehrels	·	7.0 km	MPC; JPL
20919	6606 P-L	—	September 24, 1960	Palomar	C. J. van Houten, I. van Houten-Groeneveld, T. Gehrels	·	2.2 km	MPC; JPL
20920	6653 P-L	—	September 24, 1960	Palomar	C. J. van Houten, I. van Houten-Groeneveld, T. Gehrels	·	4.2 km	MPC; JPL
20921	6680 P-L	—	September 24, 1960	Palomar	C. J. van Houten, I. van Houten-Groeneveld, T. Gehrels	V	1.9 km	MPC; JPL
20922	6769 P-L	—	September 24, 1960	Palomar	C. J. van Houten, I. van Houten-Groeneveld, T. Gehrels	THM	7.5 km	MPC; JPL
20923	6846 P-L	—	September 24, 1960	Palomar	C. J. van Houten, I. van Houten-Groeneveld, T. Gehrels	·	6.8 km	MPC; JPL
20924	9526 P-L	—	October 17, 1960	Palomar	C. J. van Houten, I. van Houten-Groeneveld, T. Gehrels	·	8.3 km	MPC; JPL
20925	9596 P-L	—	October 22, 1960	Palomar	C. J. van Houten, I. van Houten-Groeneveld, T. Gehrels	LIX	8.2 km	MPC; JPL
20926	1101 T-1	—	March 25, 1971	Palomar	C. J. van Houten, I. van Houten-Groeneveld, T. Gehrels	·	6.1 km	MPC; JPL
20927	1126 T-1	—	March 25, 1971	Palomar	C. J. van Houten, I. van Houten-Groeneveld, T. Gehrels	·	3.4 km	MPC; JPL
20928	2024 T-1	—	March 25, 1971	Palomar	C. J. van Houten, I. van Houten-Groeneveld, T. Gehrels	·	4.0 km	MPC; JPL
20929	2050 T-1	—	March 25, 1971	Palomar	C. J. van Houten, I. van Houten-Groeneveld, T. Gehrels	EOS	5.4 km	MPC; JPL
20930	2130 T-1	—	March 25, 1971	Palomar	C. J. van Houten, I. van Houten-Groeneveld, T. Gehrels	·	1.9 km	MPC; JPL
20931	2208 T-1	—	March 25, 1971	Palomar	C. J. van Houten, I. van Houten-Groeneveld, T. Gehrels	·	4.5 km	MPC; JPL
20932	2258 T-1	—	March 25, 1971	Palomar	C. J. van Houten, I. van Houten-Groeneveld, T. Gehrels	·	5.2 km	MPC; JPL
20933	3015 T-1	—	March 26, 1971	Palomar	C. J. van Houten, I. van Houten-Groeneveld, T. Gehrels	V	2.3 km	MPC; JPL
20934	4194 T-1	—	March 26, 1971	Palomar	C. J. van Houten, I. van Houten-Groeneveld, T. Gehrels	·	3.1 km	MPC; JPL
20935	4265 T-1	—	March 26, 1971	Palomar	C. J. van Houten, I. van Houten-Groeneveld, T. Gehrels	·	2.4 km	MPC; JPL
20936 Nemrut Dagi	4835 T-1	Nemrut Dagi	May 13, 1971	Palomar	C. J. van Houten, I. van Houten-Groeneveld, T. Gehrels	H	3.6 km	MPC; JPL
20937	1005 T-2	—	September 29, 1973	Palomar	C. J. van Houten, I. van Houten-Groeneveld, T. Gehrels	·	4.2 km	MPC; JPL
20938	1075 T-2	—	September 29, 1973	Palomar	C. J. van Houten, I. van Houten-Groeneveld, T. Gehrels	·	2.6 km	MPC; JPL
20939	1178 T-2	—	September 29, 1973	Palomar	C. J. van Houten, I. van Houten-Groeneveld, T. Gehrels	·	3.9 km	MPC; JPL
20940	1236 T-2	—	September 29, 1973	Palomar	C. J. van Houten, I. van Houten-Groeneveld, T. Gehrels	·	4.5 km	MPC; JPL
20941	1341 T-2	—	September 29, 1973	Palomar	C. J. van Houten, I. van Houten-Groeneveld, T. Gehrels	·	2.6 km	MPC; JPL
20942	2092 T-2	—	September 29, 1973	Palomar	C. J. van Houten, I. van Houten-Groeneveld, T. Gehrels	·	2.5 km	MPC; JPL
20943	2115 T-2	—	September 29, 1973	Palomar	C. J. van Houten, I. van Houten-Groeneveld, T. Gehrels	·	2.3 km	MPC; JPL
20944	2200 T-2	—	September 29, 1973	Palomar	C. J. van Houten, I. van Houten-Groeneveld, T. Gehrels	·	6.1 km	MPC; JPL
20945	2248 T-2	—	September 29, 1973	Palomar	C. J. van Houten, I. van Houten-Groeneveld, T. Gehrels	·	1.6 km	MPC; JPL
20946	2316 T-2	—	September 29, 1973	Palomar	C. J. van Houten, I. van Houten-Groeneveld, T. Gehrels	·	2.2 km	MPC; JPL
20947 Polyneikes	2638 T-2	Polyneikes	September 29, 1973	Palomar	C. J. van Houten, I. van Houten-Groeneveld, T. Gehrels	L4	20 km	MPC; JPL
20948	2754 T-2	—	September 30, 1973	Palomar	C. J. van Houten, I. van Houten-Groeneveld, T. Gehrels	·	3.2 km	MPC; JPL
20949	3024 T-2	—	September 30, 1973	Palomar	C. J. van Houten, I. van Houten-Groeneveld, T. Gehrels	HNS	2.6 km	MPC; JPL
20950	3305 T-2	—	September 30, 1973	Palomar	C. J. van Houten, I. van Houten-Groeneveld, T. Gehrels	NYS	2.3 km	MPC; JPL
20951	4261 T-2	—	September 29, 1973	Palomar	C. J. van Houten, I. van Houten-Groeneveld, T. Gehrels	·	3.1 km	MPC; JPL
20952 Tydeus	5151 T-2	Tydeus	September 25, 1973	Palomar	C. J. van Houten, I. van Houten-Groeneveld, T. Gehrels	L4	20 km	MPC; JPL
20953	1068 T-3	—	October 17, 1977	Palomar	C. J. van Houten, I. van Houten-Groeneveld, T. Gehrels	·	12 km	MPC; JPL
20954	1158 T-3	—	October 17, 1977	Palomar	C. J. van Houten, I. van Houten-Groeneveld, T. Gehrels	·	10 km	MPC; JPL
20955	2387 T-3	—	October 16, 1977	Palomar	C. J. van Houten, I. van Houten-Groeneveld, T. Gehrels	·	6.2 km	MPC; JPL
20956	3510 T-3	—	October 16, 1977	Palomar	C. J. van Houten, I. van Houten-Groeneveld, T. Gehrels	·	2.2 km	MPC; JPL
20957	4430 T-3	—	October 11, 1977	Palomar	C. J. van Houten, I. van Houten-Groeneveld, T. Gehrels	·	2.3 km	MPC; JPL
20958	A900 MA	—	June 29, 1900	Mount Hamilton	J. E. Keeler	·	2.8 km	MPC; JPL
20959	1936 UG	—	October 21, 1936	Nice	M. Laugier	·	5.2 km	MPC; JPL
20960 Weratschnig	1971 UR	Weratschnig	October 26, 1971	Hamburg-Bergedorf	L. Kohoutek	HYG	13 km	MPC; JPL
20961 Arkesilaos	1973 SS_{1}	Arkesilaos	September 19, 1973	Palomar	C. J. van Houten, I. van Houten-Groeneveld, T. Gehrels	L4	20 km	MPC; JPL
20962 Michizane	1977 EW_{7}	Michizane	March 12, 1977	Kiso	H. Kosai, K. Furukawa	EUN	4.5 km	MPC; JPL
20963 Pisarenko	1977 QN_{1}	Pisarenko	August 19, 1977	Nauchnij	N. S. Chernykh	EUN	6.6 km	MPC; JPL
20964 Mons Naklethi	1977 UA	Mons Naklethi	October 16, 1977	Kleť	A. Mrkos	·	4.0 km	MPC; JPL
20965 Kutafin	1978 SJ_{7}	Kutafin	September 26, 1978	Nauchnij	L. V. Zhuravleva	·	11 km	MPC; JPL
20966	1978 VH_{5}	—	November 7, 1978	Palomar	E. F. Helin, S. J. Bus	EOS	7.0 km	MPC; JPL
20967	1978 VF_{6}	—	November 7, 1978	Palomar	E. F. Helin, S. J. Bus	·	3.0 km	MPC; JPL
20968	1978 VM_{8}	—	November 7, 1978	Palomar	E. F. Helin, S. J. Bus	·	2.6 km	MPC; JPL
20969 Samo	1979 SH	Samo	September 17, 1979	Kleť	A. Mrkos	·	3.2 km	MPC; JPL
20970	1981 DD_{1}	—	February 28, 1981	Siding Spring	S. J. Bus	·	3.3 km	MPC; JPL
20971	1981 DR_{1}	—	February 28, 1981	Siding Spring	S. J. Bus	EUN	3.7 km	MPC; JPL
20972	1981 DX_{2}	—	February 28, 1981	Siding Spring	S. J. Bus	·	4.5 km	MPC; JPL
20973	1981 EL_{2}	—	March 2, 1981	Siding Spring	S. J. Bus	slow	7.3 km	MPC; JPL
20974	1981 EO_{2}	—	March 2, 1981	Siding Spring	S. J. Bus	EOS	6.7 km	MPC; JPL
20975	1981 ER_{4}	—	March 2, 1981	Siding Spring	S. J. Bus	·	5.2 km	MPC; JPL
20976	1981 EA_{6}	—	March 7, 1981	Siding Spring	S. J. Bus	·	7.5 km	MPC; JPL
20977	1981 EN_{7}	—	March 1, 1981	Siding Spring	S. J. Bus	EOS	6.3 km	MPC; JPL
20978	1981 EW_{10}	—	March 1, 1981	Siding Spring	S. J. Bus	·	1.7 km	MPC; JPL
20979	1981 EO_{13}	—	March 1, 1981	Siding Spring	S. J. Bus	·	2.1 km	MPC; JPL
20980	1981 ED_{16}	—	March 1, 1981	Siding Spring	S. J. Bus	·	2.1 km	MPC; JPL
20981	1981 EZ_{16}	—	March 6, 1981	Siding Spring	S. J. Bus	·	2.8 km	MPC; JPL
20982	1981 EL_{17}	—	March 1, 1981	Siding Spring	S. J. Bus	·	4.0 km	MPC; JPL
20983	1981 EN_{20}	—	March 2, 1981	Siding Spring	S. J. Bus	·	1.6 km	MPC; JPL
20984	1981 EH_{33}	—	March 1, 1981	Siding Spring	S. J. Bus	EOS	5.1 km	MPC; JPL
20985	1981 EA_{35}	—	March 2, 1981	Siding Spring	S. J. Bus	·	12 km	MPC; JPL
20986	1981 EL_{37}	—	March 1, 1981	Siding Spring	S. J. Bus	·	6.9 km	MPC; JPL
20987	1981 EU_{38}	—	March 1, 1981	Siding Spring	S. J. Bus	·	2.8 km	MPC; JPL
20988	1981 EC_{43}	—	March 2, 1981	Siding Spring	S. J. Bus	(2076)	3.2 km	MPC; JPL
20989	1981 EZ_{45}	—	March 2, 1981	Siding Spring	S. J. Bus	·	10 km	MPC; JPL
20990 Maryannehervey	1983 RL_{3}	Maryannehervey	September 1, 1983	La Silla	H. Debehogne	·	2.9 km	MPC; JPL
20991 Jánkollár	1984 WX_{1}	Jánkollár	November 28, 1984	Piszkéstető	M. Antal	EOS	7.1 km	MPC; JPL
20992 Marypearse	1985 RV_{2}	Marypearse	September 5, 1985	La Silla	H. Debehogne	·	4.1 km	MPC; JPL
20993 Virginiediscry	1985 RX_{2}	Virginiediscry	September 5, 1985	La Silla	H. Debehogne	·	2.7 km	MPC; JPL
20994 Atreya	1985 TS	Atreya	October 15, 1985	Anderson Mesa	E. Bowell	·	3.7 km	MPC; JPL
20995	1985 VY	—	November 1, 1985	La Silla	R. M. West	L4	26 km	MPC; JPL
20996 Pandrosion	1986 PB	Pandrosion	August 4, 1986	Palomar	E. F. Helin	H	3.0 km	MPC; JPL
20997	1986 PL_{1}	—	August 1, 1986	Palomar	E. F. Helin	HYG	12 km	MPC; JPL
20998 Houzeaudelehaie	1986 QF_{1}	Houzeaudelehaie	August 26, 1986	La Silla	H. Debehogne	·	3.0 km	MPC; JPL
20999	1987 BF	—	January 28, 1987	Ojima	T. Niijima, T. Urata	(2076)	4.2 km	MPC; JPL
21000 L'Encyclopédie	1987 BY_{1}	L'Encyclopédie	January 26, 1987	La Silla	E. W. Elst	·	5.9 km	MPC; JPL

back to top

== See also ==
- Meanings of minor-planet names: 20001–21000
