= Meanings of minor-planet names: 20001–21000 =

As minor planet discoveries are confirmed, they are given a permanent number by the IAU's Minor Planet Center (MPC), and the discoverers can then submit names for them, following the IAU's naming conventions. The list below concerns those minor planets in the specified number-range that have received names, and explains the meanings of those names.

Official naming citations of newly named small Solar System bodies are approved and published in a bulletin by IAU's Working Group for Small Bodies Nomenclature (WGSBN). Before May 2021, citations were published in MPC's Minor Planet Circulars for many decades. Recent citations can also be found on the JPL Small-Body Database (SBDB). Until his death in 2016, German astronomer Lutz D. Schmadel compiled these citations into the Dictionary of Minor Planet Names (DMP) and regularly updated the collection.

Based on Paul Herget's The Names of the Minor Planets, Schmadel also researched the unclear origin of numerous asteroids, most of which had been named prior to World War II. This article incorporates text from this source, which is in the public domain: SBDB New namings may only be added to this list below after official publication as the preannouncement of names is condemned. The WGSBN publishes a comprehensive guideline for the naming rules of non-cometary small Solar System bodies.

== 20001–20100 ==
Named minor planet	Provisional	This minor planet was named for...	Ref; Catalog
20001 Marinakoren	1991 CM	Marina Koren (born 1990), American science and astronomy writer for The Atlantic	IAU · 20001
20002 Tillysmith	1991 EM	Tilly Smith (born 1994), British girl who, by recognising the signs of a tsunami, saved many lives on the island of Phuket, December 26, 2004	JPL · 20002
20003 Andorfer	1991 EX_{2}	Gregory P. Andorfer (1951-2020), former executive director of the Maryland Science Center.	JPL · 20003
20004 Audrey-Lucienne	1991 GS_{6}	Audrey-Lucienne Van Landeghem, last visitor at the "Space is For You" Exhibition at the Royal Observatory of Belgium in 2001	JPL · 20004
20005 Zagarella	1991 GL_{7}	Roberto Zagarella (born 1953), Italian astronomer and founding observer of the PRISMA meteor network	IAU · 20005
20006 Albertus Magnus	1991 GH_{11}	Albertus Magnus, German theologian, philosopher and naturalist.	JPL · 20006
20007 Marybrown	1991 LR	Mary J. Brown, American amateur astronomer who assisted in organizing the photographic glass plate archive of the 1.2-m Schmidt Oschin Telescope at Palomar Observatory	JPL · 20007
20008 Adacarrera	1991 NG_{3}	Ada Amelia Carrera Rodriguez (1936-2020), Mexican motorcyclist, astronomer, and advocate for astronomy education	IAU · 20008
20009 Joerao	1991 OY	Joseph Rao, chief meteorologist and science editor at News 12 Westchester, guest lecturer at the Hayden Planetarium	IAU · 20009
20010 Tomfrench	1991 PN_{2}	Thomas W. French (b. 1950), a biologist and former assistant director of MassWildlife’s Natural Heritage and Endangered Species Program, led the successful reintroduction of peregrine falcons and bald eagles in Massachusetts after their native populations were wiped out due to extensive use of the insecticide DDT from the 1940s to 1972.	JPL · 20010
20011 Baryshnikov	1991 PD_{13}	Mikhail Baryshnikov (b. 1948), a Russian-born American ballet dancer, choreographer, and actor.	IAU · 20011
20012 Ranke	1991 RV_{4}	Leopold von Ranke, a professor of history in Berlin from 1825 to 1871.	JPL · 20012
20013 Nureyev	1991 RT_{26}	Rudolf Nureyev (1938–1993), a Russian-born ballet dancer, director, and choreographer.	IAU · 20013
20014 Annalisa	1991 RM_{29}	Annalisa Scarrone (b. 1985), an Italian singer and songwriter.	IAU · 20014
20015 Liguori	1991 SR	Domenico Liguori (b. 1970), an Italian physicist and teacher.	IAU · 20015
20016 Rietschel	1991 TU_{13}	Ernst Friedrich August Rietschel, German sculptor.	JPL · 20016
20017 Alixcatherine	1991 TF_{14}	Alix Catherine de Saint-Aignan (born 2002) is the eldest daughter of the discoverer	JPL · 20017
20018 Paulgray	1991 UJ_{2}	Paul Gray (born 1972), Canadian amateur astronomer who has served as President of the Royal Astronomical Society of Canada's centers in Halifax and New Brunswich	IAU · 20018
20019 Yukiotanaka	1991 VN	Yukio Tanaka, Japanese baseball infielder for the Hokkaido Nippon Ham Fighters	JPL · 20019
20020 Mipach	1991 VT	Mike Powell (born 1959), Paul Owen (born 1960), and Chris Curwin (born 1959); hosts of The Sunday Night Astronomy Show, a live web show about astronomy	IAU · 20020
20021 Kevinkell	1991 VM_{6}	Kevin Kell (born 1963), Canadian amateur astronomer, served with the RASC's Kingston Center as President, Secretary, Treasurer, Equipment Loan Coordinator, and editor of the club's newsletter	IAU · 20021
20022 Dontown	1991 VO_{7}	Donald Town (born 1953), Canadian engineer, photographer, and amateur astronomer; President of the RASC's Belleville Center	IAU · 20022
20023 Jackmegas	1992 AR	Jack Megas (born 1946), planetarium educator at the Springfield Science Museum in Springfield, Massachusetts	IAU · 20023
20024 Mayrémartínez	1992 BT_{2}	Mayré Adriana Martínez Blanco, Venezuelan professional singer, winner of the 2006 "Latin American Idol" contest	JPL · 20024
20025 Petronaviera	1992 DU_{7}	Petrona Viera (1895-1960), deaf Uruguayan painter and the first female professional painter in her country	IAU · 20025
20026 Bettyrobinson	1992 EP_{11}	Betty Robinson (b. 1953) has been an RASC member since 1981. In Toronto Centre, she was Secretary from 1984–1987 and worked on their newsletter for four years. In Mississauga Centre, she edited the newsletter and served as Councillor. She served as Director of the RASC and was copy editor of the Observer's Handbook.	IAU · 20026
20027 Michaelwatson	1992 EY_{14}	Michael S. F. Watson (b. 1952) is a lawyer and a member of the RASC since 1970. He is interested in eclipses and photography.	IAU · 20027
20028 Stansammy	1992 EZ_{21}	Stan Sammy (b. 1946), a Trinidad-born Canadian amateur astronomer.	IAU · 20028
20029 Dorner	1992 EB_{24}	Rudolph Dorner (1948–2022), a German-Canadian amateur astronomer, an electrician, machinist, investor and telescope collector.	IAU · 20029
20030 Bawtenheimer	1992 EN_{30}	Daniel C. Bawtenheimer (1900–1981), a Canadian amateur astronomer.	IAU · 20030
20031 Lakehead	1992 OO	In the early 20th century, this name described Fort William and Port Arthur in northwestern Ontario, because the twin cities were located at the head of Lake Superior. Significant because grain from the Canadian prairies was brought by rail to ships there, the cities merged in 1970 under the name Thunder Bay. It is still often referred to as the Lakehead.	IAU · 20031
20032 McNish	1992 PU	Larry McNish (b. 1950), a computer science engineer and Canadian amateur astronomer.	IAU · 20032
20033 Michaelnoble	1992 PR_{1}	Michael P. Noble (1954–2022), a Canadian amateur astronomer.	IAU · 20033
20034 Greenhalgh	1992 PK_{2}	Paul Greenhalgh (1957–2017), a Canadian amateur astronomer.	IAU · 20034
20035 Lauriroche	1992 SA_{4}	Lauri Roche (b. 1949), a retired math teacher who joined RASC Victoria Centre in 1995.	IAU · 20035
20036 Marcboucher	1992 UW_{1}	Marc Boucher (b. 1964), a Canadian entrepreneur, writer, editor and publisher.	IAU · 20036
20037 Duke	1992 UW_{4}	Michael B. Duke, American selenologist areologist and meteoriticist, at one point curator of the lunar samples returned from the Moon, later chief of the Lunar and Planetary Sciences Division of the Johnson Spacecraft Center	JPL · 20037
20038 Arasaki	1992 UN_{5}	Yoshikuni Arasaki (born 1953) has been chief of the Okinawa Prefecture Ishigaki Youth House since 2017. He is a well-known amateur astronomer and popularizer of astronomy in Ishigaki Island. He enjoys observing and photographing comets, nebulae and star clusters through his telescope.	JPL · 20038
20039 Danfalk	1992 WJ	Daniel (Dan) Falk (b. 1966), a Canadian author and former co-host of the BookLab podcast.	IAU · 20039
20040 Tatsuyamatsuyama	1992 WT_{3}	Tatsuya Matsuyama (born 1983) was born in Kochi city, Japan. He teaches at University of Kochi Primary School and works as an instructor at Geisei Observatory. He is dedicated to improving mathematical skills and increasing astronomical knowledge of primary school students.	JPL · 20040
20041 Gainor	1992 YH	Christopher Gainor (b. 1954), a Canadian journalist, historian. and amateur astronomer	IAU · 20041
20042 Mortillaro	1993 CK_{1}	Nicole Mortillaro (b. 1972), a Canadian science journalist and amateur astronomer.	IAU · 20042
20043 Ellenmacarthur	1993 EM	Dame Ellen Patricia MacArthur, British solo long-distance yachtswoman	JPL · 20043
20044 Vitoux	1993 FV_{1}	Frédéric Vitoux (born 1944), a French writer and journalist known for his novel Bébert, Le chat de Louis-Ferdinand Céline (1976)	JPL · 20044
20045 Semeniuk	1993 FV_{11}	Ivan Alexander Semeniuk (b. 1964), a Canadian science writer.	IAU · 20045
20046 Seronik	1993 FE_{15}	Gary Seronik (b. 1961) is a Canadian astronomer, photographer and writer.	IAU · 20046
20047 Davidsuzuki	1993 FD_{18}	David Takayoshi Suzuki (b. 1936), a Canadian geneticist and science communicator.	IAU · 20047
20048 Alfianello	1993 FF_{19}	Alfianello, an Italian municipality in the province of Brescia (Lombardy).	IAU · 20048
20049 Antoniopresti	1993 FZ	Antonio Presti (b. 1957), a Sicilian patron and founder of Fiumara d'Arte, an open-air museum in Sicily.	IAU · 20049
20050 Aglaonice	1993 FO_{21}	Aglaonice of Thessaly (2nd or 1st century BCE), one the earliest recorded women astronomers.	IAU · 20050
20051 Phanostrate	1993 FE_{26}	Phanostrate (4th century BCE), a Greek midwife and physician.	IAU · 20051
20052 Kellman	1993 FS_{27}	Edith Kellman (1911–2007), an American astronomer.	IAU · 20052
20053 Cavefish	1993 FK_{29}	There are over 250 fish species that are adapted to living in subterranean caves. Small, blind, and lacking pigment, cavefishes are evolutionary marvels. Comparisons between the DNA of different cavefish species can be used to unravel geologic history. Many cavefishes are threatened by human activity.	IAU · 20053
20054 Lágrimaríos	1993 FX_{37}	Lidia Mabel Benavídez Tabárez (Lágrima Ríos, 1924–2006), an Afro-Uruguayan singer who excelled in candombe and tango, the two representative genres of the Río de la Plata region.	IAU · 20054
20055 Maríaespínola	1993 FB_{47}	María Espínola Espínola (1878–1963), a Uruguayan teacher and supervisor who founded the first school of technical studies in San José de Mayo city.	IAU · 20055
20056 Roccati	1993 FU_{64}	Alessandro Roccati (born 1941), Italian archaeologist and Egyptologist.	IAU · 20056
20057 Fabiorubeo	1993 GC	Fabio Rubeo (born 1973), Italian amateur astronomer.	IAU · 20057
20058 Bundalian	1993 OM_{8}	Ester Inocencio Bundalian (b. 1939), an experienced Philippine eclipse chaser.	IAU · 20058
20059 Debswoboda	1993 OY_{9}	Debra Antoinette Swoboda (1955–2025), American academic who established one of the first graduate student unions at Stony Brook.	IAU · 20059
20060 Johannforster	1993 PV_{5}	Johann Reinhold Forster, 18th-century German naturalist, who (with his son Georg) accompanied James Cook on his second Pacific Voyage	JPL · 20060
20061 Bilitza	1993 QS_{1}	Dieter Bilitza (b. 1950), a German-born American physicist and a principal author of the International Reference Ionosphere (IRI), a widely-used standard for Earth’s ionospheric plasma.	IAU · 20061
20062 Matthewgriffin	1993 QB_{3}	Matthew Griffin (b. 1954), an Irish astrophysicist.	IAU · 20062
20063 Kanakoseki	1993 RC_{4}	Kanako Seki (b. 1973), a Japanese astrophysicist.	IAU · 20063
20064 Prahladagrawal	1993 RV_{4}	Prahlad Agrawal (b. 1941), an Indian high-energy astrophysicist.	IAU · 20064
20065 Kminek	1993 RK_{5}	Gerhard Kminek (b. 1968), an Austrian astronomer.	IAU · 20065
20066 Sagov	1993 TM_{4}	Stanley E. Sagov (b. 1944) is a highly respected family-practice physician who also taught at Harvard Medical School; he obtained his MD at the University of Cape Town before moving to the US. Sagov also is well known as an accomplished jazz musician. Name proposed by D. W. E. Green, whose family was attended by Dr. Sagov for nearly forty years.	IAU · 20066
20067 Marthanieves	1993 TN_{24}	Martha Nieves (1926–2014), Uruguayan artist and schoolteacher who made important contributions to plastic arts and culture.	IAU · 20067
20068 Peterbarthel	1993 TE_{34}	Pieter Dirk (Peter) Barthel, Dutch astronomer.	IAU · 20068
20069 Monyer	1993 TD_{37}	Hannah Monyer, Romanian-born German neurobiologist.	IAU · 20069
20070 Koichiyuko	1993 XL	Koichi Takahashi, director of the Hiroshima Chapter of the Young Astronauts Club of Japan since 1998, and his wife Yuko (a medical doctor and a pharmacist, respectively)	JPL · 20070
20073 Yumiko	1994 AN_{2}	Yumiko Fujii (born 1968) is married to the second discoverer	JPL · 20073
20074 Laskerschueler	1994 AF_{16}	Else Lasker-Schüler (1869–1945), a German-Jewish poet and playwright of the Expressionist movement	JPL · 20074
20077 Borispodolsky	1994 CX_{9}	Boris Yakovlevich Podolsky, Russian-American physicist.	IAU · 20077
20078 Nathanrosen	1994 CO_{16}	Nathan Rosen, American and Israeli physicist.	IAU · 20078
20080 Maeharatorakichi	1994 EO_{1}	Torakichi Maehara (1872–1950) was an amateur astronomer and one of the charter members of the Astronomical Society of Japan, which was founded in 1908. He established his own observatory and made many visual and photographic observations, including Halley's comet in 1910.	JPL · 20080
20081 Occhialini	1994 EE_{3}	Giuseppe Occhialini, Italian physicist.	JPL · 20081
20082 Yannlecun	1994 EG_{7}	Yann Andre Le Cun (born 1960), French-American computer scientist who contributed to the fields of machine learning and artificial intelligence.	JPL · 20082
20084 Buckmaster	1994 GU_{9}	Bill Buckmaster, American anchor of the news magazine program Arizona Illustrated	JPL · 20084
20087 Abbiedonaldson	1994 PC_{7}	Abbie Louise Donaldson, Northern Irish astronomer at the University of Edinburgh who works on comets.	IAU · 20087
20088 Adambattle	1994 PQ_{10}	Adam McShane Battle, American planetary astronomer who received his doctorate from the University of Arizona’s Lunar and Planetary Laboratory in 2024.	IAU · 20088
20089 Áineobrien	1994 PA_{14}	Áine Clare O’Brien, British planetary scientist at the University of Glasgow, investigating organic compounds in meteorites, and a member of the UK Fireball Alliance team that found the Winchcombe meteorite in 2021.	IAU · 20089
20090 Albin	1994 PN_{16}	Thomas Albin, German astronomer at the Institute of Space Systems, University of Stuttgart.	IAU · 20090
20091 Alfredoescalante	1994 PK_{20}	Alfredo Escalante López, Spanish researcher at the European Space Astronomy Centre in Madrid.	IAU · 20091
20092 Allisonmcgraw	1994 PL_{22}	Allison McGraw, American planetary scientist working at the Lunar and Planetary Institute/USRA.	IAU · 20092
20093 Andrewalberini	1994 PN_{22}	Andrew Alberini, Italian scientist. He conducted laboratory experiments supporting NASA’s Mars 2020 mission, identifying magnesium sulfates as photoprotective minerals for the preservation of organic matter on Mars.	IAU · 20093
20094 Andrewcoates	1994 PS_{26}	Andrew Coates, British professor of planetary physics at University College London’s Mullard Space Science Laboratory.	IAU · 20094
20095 Andylopezoquendo	1994 PG_{35}	Andy J. Lopez-Oquendo, Puerto Rican astronomer who received his Ph.D. from Northern Arizona University in 2024.	IAU · 20095
20096 Shiraishiakihiko	1994 TZ	Akihiko Shiraishi (born 1952) is a writer-editor at Asahi Press. He writes frequently about astronomy and space development.	JPL · 20096
20098 Shibatagenji	1994 WC_{2}	Genji Shibata (born 1940) is a medical doctor, who contributed to public welfare by establishing a hospital and a home for elderly people in Yamaguchi, Japan.	JPL · 20098

== 20101–20200 ==
back to top

Named minor planet	Provisional	This minor planet was named for...	Ref; Catalog
20101 Robsullivan	1994 XM_{2}	Robert John Sullivan, Jr. American planetary scientist.	IAU · 20101
20102 Takasago	1995 BP_{15}	Takasago, a Japanese port city at the mouth of the Kakogawa River, Hyogo prefecture	JPL · 20102
20103 de Vico	1995 JK	Francesco de Vico (1805–1848), Jesuit priest and astronomer, discoverer of seven comets, and director of the Collegio Romano Observatory	JPL · 20103
20105 Linjingming	1995 OS_{1}	Lin Jingming, Chinese amateur astronomer.	IAU · 20105
20106 Morton	1995 QG	Donald C. Morton, was director of the Anglo-Australian Observatory during 1976–1986	JPL · 20106
20107 Nanyotenmondai	1995 QY_{3}	Nanyotenmondai, the Nanyo Citizens' Observatory, in the Sosyou park of Nanyo, Yamagata, Japan	JPL · 20107
20109 Alicelandis	1995 RJ	Alice Landis Tonry, American graduate of Tufts Medical School, realtor, farmer, and mother of the discoverer	JPL · 20109
20112 Cassia	1995 SD_{31}	Dennis Cassia, accomplished American astrophotographer.	IAU · 20112
20113 Uckert	1995 SL_{35}	Kyle Uckert, an American researcher at the Jet Propulsion Laboratory and Deputy Principal Investigator for the Perseverance rover's SHERLOC spectrometer.	IAU · 20113
20114 Hikage	1995 UQ_{44}	Sanjyu Hikage, Japanese singer-songwriter and artist.	IAU · 20114
20115 Niheihajime	1995 VC_{1}	Hajime Nihei, member of the Nanyo Astronomy Lovers Club	JPL · 20115
20117 Tannoakira	1995 VN_{1}	Akira Tanno (born 1940) is a historian studying folk customs and scientists in the Edo period of Japan.	JPL · 20117
20120 Ryugatake	1995 WB_{5}	Ryugatake, a Japanese town in Kumamoto, on the east coast of the beautiful Kamishima Island, Amakusa	JPL · 20120
20123 Hansamundsen	1995 WD_{32}	Hans E. F. Amundsen (1958–2023) led the Arctic Mars Analogue Svalbard Expedition (AMASE). A rugged Norwegian field scientist, he established Svalbard as a premier testing ground for NASA Mars missions after the site revealed features analogous to Martian carbonates. With the AMASE team he helped develop instruments for multiple Mars missions.	IAU · 20123
20124 Marilynfogel	1995 WJ_{36}	Marilyn L. Fogel, a pioneering American biogeochemist and expert on stable isotopes at the Carnegie Institution and University of California.	IAU · 20124
20126 Sandfordasher	1995 YM_{9}	Sandford (Sandy) Asher, American planetary scientist.	IAU · 20126
20127 Benning	1995 YV_{22}	Liane G. Benning, German expert in mineral formation and microbe/mineral interactions in extreme environments.	IAU · 20127
20128 Panconrad	1996 AK	Pamela (Pan) G. Conrad (b. 1952), American astrobiologist and expert on planetary habitability.	IAU · 20128
20132 Huangwei	1996 BK_{13}	Huang Wei, Chinese amateur astronomer.	IAU · 20132
20134 Yeqisun	1996 GT_{2}	Ye Qisun, Chinese physicist and educator, widely considered one of the founders of modern physics in China.	IAU · 20134
20135 Juels	1996 JC	Charles W. Juels (1944–2009), amateur astronomer and discoverer of minor planets	JPL · 20135
20136 Eisenhart	1996 NA	Luther Pfahler Eisenhart (1876–1965), a prolific American mathematician and professor	JPL · 20136
20137 Àngeljorba	1996 PX_{8}	Àngel Jorba Monte, Spanish mathematics professor at the University of Barcelona.	IAU · 20137
20138 Carinalee	1996 QP	Carina Lee, American planetary scientist.	IAU · 20138
20139 Marianeschi	1996 QU	Edmondo Marianeschi (1922–2010) was one of the most important Italian metallurgists. He wrote important books and obtained several international patents on steel manufacturing. An amateur astronomer, he designed, among others, the Montecitorio square sundial in Rome.	JPL · 20139
20140 Costitx	1996 QT_{1}	Costitx, Spanish town on the island of Majorca	MPC · 20140
20141 Markidger	1996 RL_{5}	Mark Richard Kidger (born 1960), British-born astrophysicist of the Instituto de Astrofisica de Canarias	JPL · 20141
20142 Joannaclark	1996 RC_{12}	Joanna V. Clark, American planetary scientist.	IAU · 20142
20143 Julianegross	1996 RQ_{16}	Juliane Gross, German-American scientist.	IAU · 20143
20145 Chiachiaolin	1996 SS_{4}	Chia-Chiao Lin, Chinese-American applied mathematician and physicist.	IAU · 20145
20148 Carducci	1996 TR	Giosuè Carducci (1835–1907) was an Italian poet, writer, literary critic and teacher, who in 1906 was the first Italian to receive the Nobel Prize in Literature.	IAU · 20148
20149 Huh	1996 TX_{3}	Michael Huh, American scientist.	IAU · 20149
20150 Changshuhong	1996 TJ_{6}	Chang Shuhong, Chinese painter and Dunhuang scholar.	IAU · 20150
20151 Utsunomiya	1996 TO_{6}	Syogo Utsunomiya, farmer and renowned amateur astronomer in Japan	JPL · 20151
20152 Regberg	1996 TQ_{7}	Aaron B. Regberg, an American scientist.	IAU · 20152
20155 Utewindolf	1996 TS_{11}	Ute Windolf of Prescott, Arizona, is a very dear and generous friend who was particularly helpful and supportive during the long terminal illness of the discoverer's wife	JPL · 20155
20156 Herbwindolf	1996 TU_{11}	Herbert Windolf of Prescott, Arizona, is a very dear and generous friend who was particularly helpful and supportive during the long terminal illness of the discoverer's wife	JPL · 20156
20157 Andreaharrington	1996 TS_{18}	Andrea D. Harrington, an American scientist.	IAU · 20157
20158 Allton	1996 TD_{21}	Judith H. Allton, American contamination-control expert.	IAU · 20158
20159 Snead	1996 TM_{28}	Christopher J. Snead, American planetary scientist.	IAU · 20159
20160 Annałosiak	1996 TH_{42}	Anna Łosiak, Polish planetary geologist at the Institute of Geological Sciences, Polish Academy of Sciences.	IAU · 20160
20164 Janzajíc	1996 VJ_{2}	Jan Zajíc, Czech student who burned himself to death to protest the 1968 occupation of Czechoslovakia †	MPC · 20164
20165 Zeigler	1996 VT_{2}	Ryan A. Zeigler, American scientist.	IAU · 20165
20169 Ritchey	1996 VG_{11}	George Willis Ritchey, American optician, telescope maker, and astronomer.	IAU · 20169
20171 Salerno	1996 WC_{2}	Salerno is a provincial capital in Campania, Italy.	IAU · 20171
20172 Martin	1996 XT_{16}	Martha Evans Martin, American pioneer of popular astronomy. Through her classic books The Friendly Stars and The Ways of the Planets	IAU · 20172
20174 Eisenstein	1996 XD_{20}	Gotthold Eisenstein (1823–1852), German mathematician	JPL · 20174
20175 Starmus	1996 XJ_{27}	The Starmus Festival is an international festival, first held in 2011 to celebrate 50 years of manned space flight. Starmus focuses on astronomy, space exploration, music, art and natural sciences, and brings together some of the most brilliant minds on the planet to enhance science communication.	IAU · 20175
20176 Aliciagoyena	1996 XK_{29}	Alicia Goyena, Uruguayan educator who was a history teacher. As Director of the Women’s Section of the Instituto Batlle y Ordóñez in Montevideo, she promoted a humanistic education and women’s access to secondary education. Alicia’s work contributed to the development of secondary education in Uruguay.	IAU · 20176
20177 Richardallen	1996 XP_{29}	Richard Hinckley Allen, American amateur astronomer, naturalist, and writer. He is best known for Star Names: Their Lore and Meaning, the first major English-language monograph to systematically document the etymology of star names, constellation histories, and associated folklore.	IAU · 20177
20179 Huangtianyi	1996 XX_{31}	Huang Tianyi, professor of astronomy at Nanjing University.	IAU · 20179
20180 Annakolény	1996 YG_{1}	Anna Kolény took part in the birth of Slovak sovereignty in the nineteenth century. The first session of the Slovak National Council was held in 1848 in her house in Myjava	JPL · 20180
20187 Janapittichová	1997 AN_{17}	Jana Pittichová, Slovak-born American astronomer † ‡	MPC · 20187
20192 Thomasback	1997 BE_{4}	Thomas Michael Back, American optician and amateur astronomer who revolutionized apochromatic refractor telescopes.	IAU · 20192
20193 Yakushima	1997 BH_{8}	Yakushima is a small island located to the south of Kagoshima prefecture, Japan.	JPL · 20193
20194 Ilarialocantore	1997 BH_{9}	Ilaria Locantore (born 1984), an Italian chemist.	JPL · 20194
20195 Mariovinci	1997 BS_{9}	Mario Vinci (born 1945) is a generous amateur astronomer and a great friend of the Gruppo Astrofili di Montelupo. He always stood out his availability and support during the construction of the "Beppe Forti" observatory.	JPL · 20195
20197 Enriques	1997 CK_{22}	Federigo Enriques, professor at the universities of Bologna and Rome	JPL · 20197
20200 Donbacky	1997 DW	Don Backy is the artistic name of the Italian singer and composer Aldo Caponi	JPL · 20200

== 20201–20300 ==
back to top

Named minor planet	Provisional	This minor planet was named for...	Ref; Catalog
20204 Yuudurunosato	1997 EV_{25}	Yuudurunosato is the nickname of Urushiyama, located in the western area of Nanyo city	JPL · 20204
20205 Sitanchen	1997 EJ_{34}	Sitan Chen (born 1995), an ISTS awardee in 2012	JPL · 20205
20206 Annewellbrock	1997 FA_{4}	Anne Wellbrock, German-British planetary scientist working at University College London’s Mullard Space Science Laboratory.	IAU · 20206
20207 Dyckovsky	1997 FB_{4}	Ari Misha Dyckovsky (born 1993), an ISTS awardee in 2012	JPL · 20207
20208 Philiphe	1997 FC_{4}	Philip Cody He (born 1994), an ISTS awardee in 2012	JPL · 20208
20210 Athanasopoulos	1997 GQ_{7}	Dimitrios Athanasopoulos, Greek astronomer specializing in astronomical observations and the rotational properties of small Solar System bodies.	IAU · 20210
20211 Joycegates	1997 GK_{8}	Joyce Gates, mentor at the ISTS in 2012	JPL · 20211
20212 Ekbaltouma	1997 GR_{8}	Ekbal Touma, mentor at the ISTS in 2012	JPL · 20212
20213 Saurabhsharan	1997 GE_{20}	Saurabh Sharan (born 1993), an ISTS awardee in 2012	JPL · 20213
20214 Lorikenny	1997 GL_{21}	Lori Kenny, mentor at the ISTS in 2012	JPL · 20214
20217 Kathyclemmer	1997 GK_{33}	Kathy Clemmer, mentor at the ISTS in 2012	JPL · 20217
20218 Dukewriter	1997 GT_{34}	Duke Writer, mentor at the ISTS in 2012	JPL · 20218
20219 Brianstone	1997 GP_{36}	Brian Stone, mentor at the ISTS in 2012	JPL · 20219
20220 Beebe	1997 GA_{40}	Wilson Beebe, American researcher at the University of Washington.	IAU · 20220
20221 Bektešević	1997 HV_{8}	Dino Bektešević, Croatian astronomer working at the DiRAC Institute and the University of Washington.	IAU · 20221
20222 Benseguane	1997 HP_{11}	Selma Benseguane, Algerian astronomer.	IAU · 20222
20224 Johnrae	1997 JR_{13}	John Rae, Scottish explorer	JPL · 20224
20225 Petrunin	1997 MG_{1}	Yuri Petrunin, Russian-American optician and telescope maker.	IAU · 20225
20227 Bernardinelli	1997 WS_{35}	Pedro H. Bernardinelli, Brazilian astronomer at the University of São Paulo who studies distant objects in the outer Solar System: trans-Neptunian objects, comets, and interstellar objects.	IAU · 20227
20228 Jeanmarcmari	1997 XG	Jean-Marc Mari, French electronics engineer	JPL · 20228
20230 Blanchard	1997 XH_{5}	Guillaume Blanchard, French optician	JPL · 20230
20234 Billgibson	1998 AV_{9}	William C. Gibson, the payload manager of the New Horizons Pluto Kuiper Belt mission	JPL · 20234
20237 Clavius	1998 CC_{3}	Christopher Clavius (1538–1612) was a German mathematician and astronomer. He figured out where to place the leap years in the Gregorian calendar. Pope Gregory XII revised the Julian calendar with the assistance of Clavius.	JPL · 20237
20242 Sagot	1998 DN_{27}	Robert Sagot, amateur astronomer	JPL · 20242
20243 Den Bosch	1998 DB_{36}	Den Bosch (s-Hertogenbosch) is the capital of the province of North Brabant in the Netherlands.	JPL · 20243
20246 Frappa	1998 ER_{6}	Éric Frappa, French amateur astronomer	JPL · 20246
20249 Bincheng	1998 EM_{10}	Bin Cheng, Chinese planetary scientist.	IAU · 20249
20250 Burdanov	1998 EP_{11}	Artem Burdanov is a native of Russia working as a research scientist at the Massachusetts Institute of Technology.	IAU · 20250
20251 Carminegiordano	1998 EA_{12}	Carmine Giordano, Italian professor with expertise in astrodynamics in small Solar System body environments.	IAU · 20251
20252 Eyjafjallajökull	1998 EY_{13}	Eyjafjallajökull, volcano in southern Iceland	JPL · 20252
20254 Úpice	1998 FE_{2}	Úpice is a small town in northeastern Bohemia	JPL · 20254
20256 Adolfneckař	1998 FC_{3}	Adolf Neckař, former director of the Ondřejov Observatory	MPC · 20256
20259 Alanhoffman	1998 FV_{10}	Alan Hoffman, American engineer, a pioneer in infrared detectors	JPL · 20259
20264 Chauhan	1998 FV_{20}	Neha Chauhan, an ISTS awardee in 2004	MPC · 20264
20265 Yuyinchen	1998 FP_{23}	Yuyin Chen, an ISTS awardee in 2004	MPC · 20265
20266 Danielchoi	1998 FK_{26}	Daniel Chimin Choi, an ISTS awardee in 2004	MPC · 20266
20267 Carrieholt	1998 FU_{27}	Carrie Holt, American astronomer at the Las Cumbres Observatory who received her Ph.D. in 2023 from the University of Maryland.	IAU · 20267
20268 Racollier	1998 FC_{28}	Rachael Theresa Collier, an ISTS awardee in 2004	MPC · 20268
20269 Cecilysunday	1998 FF_{28}	Cecily Sunday, French-American scientist who completed her Ph.D. at ISAE-SUPAERO (Toulouse, France) in 2022.	IAU · 20269
20270 Phildeutsch	1998 FR_{30}	Phillip Thomas Deutsch, an ISTS awardee in 2004	MPC · 20270
20271 Allygoldberg	1998 FK_{32}	Allyson Molly Goldberg, an ISTS awardee in 2004	MPC · 20271
20272 Duyha	1998 FH_{33}	Duy Minh Ha, an ISTS awardee in 2004	MPC · 20272
20273 Charlottebays	1998 FO_{37}	Charlotte Bays, British cosmochemist.	IAU · 20273
20274 Halperin	1998 FZ_{40}	Bruce David Halperin, an ISTS and ISEF awardee in 2004	MPC · 20274
20275 Chrishamann	1998 FR_{41}	Christopher Hamann, German scientist at the Museum für Naturkunde Berlin.	IAU · 20275
20276 Chrystianpereira	1998 FO_{42}	Chrystian Luciano Pereira, Brazilian researcher, specializing in observation and analysis of stellar occultations.	IAU · 20276
20277 Clementlee	1998 FL_{44}	Clement G. Lee, American engineer at NASA’s Jet Propulsion Laboratory.	IAU · 20277
20278 Qileihang	1998 FP_{45}	Qilei Hang, an ISTS awardee in 2004	MPC · 20278
20279 Harel	1998 FZ_{47}	Matan Harel, an ISTS awardee in 2004	MPC · 20279
20280 Colazo	1998 FQ_{49}	Milagros Rita Colazo, Argentinian planetary scientist.	IAU · 20280
20281 Kathartman	1998 FZ_{49}	Katherine Hartman, an ISTS awardee in 2004	MPC · 20281
20282 Hedberg	1998 FT_{51}	Herbert Mason Hedberg, an ISTS awardee in 2004	MPC · 20282
20283 Elizaheller	1998 FG_{55}	Elizabeth Rose Heller, an ISTS awardee in 2004	MPC · 20283
20284 Andreilevin	1998 FL_{58}	Andrei Joseph Levin, an ISTS awardee in 2004	MPC · 20284
20285 Lubin	1998 FU_{58}	Amos Benjamin Lubin, an ISTS awardee in 2004	MPC · 20285
20286 Michta	1998 FT_{59}	Maria Lynn Michta, an ISTS awardee in 2004	MPC · 20286
20287 Munteanu	1998 FT_{61}	Andrei Munteanu, an ISTS awardee in 2004, and US Naval Observatory SEAP intern	MPC · 20287
20288 Nachbaur	1998 FR_{62}	Moriah Katherine Nachbaur, an ISTS awardee in 2004	MPC · 20288
20289 Nettimi	1998 FQ_{64}	Divya Nettimi, an ISTS awardee in 2004	MPC · 20289
20290 Seanraj	1998 FJ_{65}	Sean Dilip Raj, an ISTS awardee in 2004	MPC · 20290
20291 Raumurthy	1998 FF_{67}	Rohini Subhadra Rau-Murthy, an ISTS awardee in 2004. 23061 Blueglass was named after her mentor Michael Blueglass; he also in 2007 mentored Alexandria Ocasio-Cortez after whom 23238 Ocasio-Cortez was named	MPC · 20291
20292 Eduardreznik	1998 FV_{70}	Eduard Reznik, 2004 Intel Science Talent Search winner †	MPC · 20292
20293 Sirichelson	1998 FQ_{72}	Silas Isaac Richelson, an ISTS awardee in 2004	MPC · 20293
20295 Corgne	1998 FF_{75}	Alexandre Corgne, French-Chilean petrologist and geochemist with a Ph.D. from the University of Bristol, England.	IAU · 20295
20296 Shayestorm	1998 FL_{76}	Shaye Perry Storm, an ISTS awardee in 2004	MPC · 20296
20297 Cristianomat	1998 FQ_{76}	Cristian Omat, Romanian astronomer at the Astronomical Institute of the Romanian Academy.	IAU · 20297
20298 Gordonsu	1998 FW_{77}	Gordon L. Su, an ISTS awardee in 2004	MPC · 20298
20299 Danielkelley	1998 FH_{78}	Daniel T. Kelley, American engineer recognized for his contributions to klystron design and operations within NASA’s Deep Space Network.	IAU · 20299
20300 Arjunsuri	1998 FE_{84}	Arjun Anand Suri, an ISTS awardee in 2004	MPC · 20300

== 20301–20400 ==
back to top

Named minor planet	Provisional	This minor planet was named for...	Ref; Catalog
20301 Thakur	1998 FY_{99}	Gaurav Subhash Thakur, an ISTS awardee in 2004	MPC · 20301
20302 Kevinwang	1998 FW_{100}	Kevin Yibo Wang, an ISTS awardee in 2004	MPC · 20302
20303 Lindwestrick	1998 FU_{101}	Linda Brown Westrick, an ISTS awardee in 2004	MPC · 20303
20304 Wolfson	1998 FA_{102}	Jayne Frances Wolfson, an ISTS awardee in 2004	MPC · 20304
20305 Feliciayen	1998 FU_{102}	Felicia Yuen-Lee Yen, an ISTS awardee in 2004	MPC · 20305
20306 Richarnold	1998 FC_{106}	Richard Arnold, mentor at the ISTS in 2004	MPC · 20306
20307 Johnbarnes	1998 FH_{106}	John Barnes, mentor at the ISTS in 2004	MPC · 20307
20308 Daohaili	1998 FP_{109}	Daohai Li, Chinese astronomer working at Beijing Normal University.	IAU · 20308
20309 Batalden	1998 FD_{110}	John Batalden, mentor at the ISTS in 2004	MPC · 20309
20310 Donggooroh	1998 FD_{117}	Dong-Goo Roh, Korean researcher at the Korea Astronomy and Space Science Institute.	IAU · 20310
20311 Nancycarter	1998 FH_{117}	Nancy Carter, mentor at the ISTS in 2004	MPC · 20311
20312 Danahy	1998 FH_{118}	Thomas Danahy, mentor at the ISTS in 2004	MPC · 20312
20313 Fredrikson	1998 FM_{122}	Robert Fredrikson, mentor at the ISTS in 2004	MPC · 20313
20314 Johnharrison	1998 FN_{126}	John Harrison, English clock designer	JPL · 20314
20315 Dotson	1998 FD_{130}	Jessie Dotson, American astrophysicist at NASA Ames Research Center.	IAU · 20315
20316 Jerahalpern	1998 FU_{138}	Jerald Halpern, mentor at the ISTS in 2004	MPC · 20316
20317 Hendrickson	1998 FD_{144}	Gary Hendrickson, mentor at the ISTS in 2004	MPC · 20317
20320 Eloypeña	1998 GH_{8}	Eloy Peña-Asensio, Spanish planetary scientist and aerospace engineer.	IAU · 20320
20321 Lightdonovan	1998 HJ_{19}	Donna Light-Donovan, mentor at the ISTS in 2004	MPC · 20321
20322 Emilwilawer	1998 HZ_{20}	Emil Wilawer, Polish astronomer working on physical properties of asteroids.	IAU · 20322
20323 Tomlindstom	1998 HC_{21}	Tom Lindstom, mentor at the ISTS in 2004	MPC · 20323
20324 Johnmahoney	1998 HF_{22}	John Mahoney, mentor at the ISTS in 2004	MPC · 20324
20325 Julianoey	1998 HO_{27}	Julian Oey (born 1964), a prolific asteroid photometrist, observing from Australia. He is the principal discoverer of four binary asteroids and co-discoverer of several others, using the photometry technique. He has written or co-authored a number of papers on binary and other asteroids. Name suggested by P. Pravec and A. Harris (Src).	JPL · 20325
20326 Erard	1998 HG_{37}	Stéphane Erard, French astronomer at the Paris Observatory who has worked on the surface mineralogy of Mars, the Moon and asteroids.	IAU · 20326
20327 Fernandotinaut	1998 HQ_{39}	Fernando Tinaut Ruano, Spanish researcher at the Observatoire de la Côte d’Azur (Nice, France).	IAU · 20327
20329 Manfro	1998 HQ_{43}	Nina Manfro, mentor at the ISTS in 2004	MPC · 20329
20330 Manwell	1998 HY_{44}	Anne Manwell, mentor at the ISTS in 2004	MPC · 20330
20331 Bijemarks	1998 HH_{45}	Billie Jean Marks, mentor at the ISTS in 2004	MPC · 20331
20333 Johannhuth	1998 HH_{51}	Johann Sigismund Huth, 18th–19th-century Ukrainian astronomer	JPL · 20333
20334 Glewitsky	1998 HL_{51}	Grigori Vasil'evich Lewitzky, 19th–20th-century Russian founder and first director of the Astronomical Observatory of Kharkov National University, later director of Tartu Observatoorium (Tartu Observatory)	JPL · 20334
20335 Charmartell	1998 HK_{57}	Charles Martell, mentor at the ISTS in 2004	MPC · 20335
20336 Gretamills	1998 HY_{61}	Greta Mills, mentor at the ISTS in 2004	MPC · 20336
20337 Naeve	1998 HP_{83}	Larry Naeve, mentor at the ISTS in 2004	MPC · 20337
20338 Elainepappas	1998 HA_{86}	Elaine Pappas, mentor at the ISTS in 2004	MPC · 20338
20339 Eileenreed	1998 HM_{88}	Eileen Reed, mentor at the ISTS in 2004	MPC · 20339
20340 Susanruder	1998 HR_{91}	Susan Ruder, mentor at the ISTS in 2004	MPC · 20340
20341 Alanstack	1998 HX_{91}	Alan Stack, mentor at the ISTS in 2004	MPC · 20341
20342 Trinh	1998 HB_{97}	Jonathan Trinh, mentor at the ISTS in 2004	MPC · 20342
20343 Vaccariello	1998 HC_{100}	Michael Vaccariello, mentor at the ISTS in 2004	MPC · 20343
20344 Filippotusberti	1998 HF_{103}	Filippo Tusberti, Italian planetologist at the Astronomical Observatory of Padua.	IAU · 20344
20345 Davidvito	1998 HH_{114}	David Vito, mentor at the ISTS in 2004	MPC · 20345
20346 Firre	1998 HZ_{114}	Daniel Firre, Belgian astronomer and ground operations engineer who has worked at the European Space Agency for over two decades.	IAU · 20346
20347 Wunderlich	1998 HM_{121}	Daniel Wunderlich, mentor at the ISTS in 2004	MPC · 20347
20348 Fodde	1998 HK_{122}	Iosto Fodde, Dutch-Italian professor with expertise in nonlinear dynamical systems.	IAU · 20348
20349 Gabrielpinto	1998 HU_{123}	Gabriel Pinto Morales, Chilean geologist at UCN, Chile, with a Ph.D. from the University of Lorraine, France and the Universidad de Atacama, Chile.	IAU · 20349
20350 Georgebrydon	1998 HV_{125}	George Frederick Brydon, British scientist at the University of Glasgow.	IAU · 20350
20351 Kaborchardt	1998 HN_{127}	Kasey Lynn Borchardt, a DCYSC awardee in 2004	MPC · 20351
20352 Pinakibose	1998 HC_{129}	Pinaki Bose, a DCYSC awardee in 2004	MPC · 20352
20353 Gianotto	1998 HD_{129}	Francesco Gianotto, Italian aerospace engineer working at ESA’s Planetary Defence Office.	IAU · 20353
20354 Rebeccachan	1998 HA_{139}	Rebecca Ann Chan, a DCYSC awardee in 2004	MPC · 20354
20355 Saraclark	1998 HD_{146}	Sara Catherine Clark, a DCYSC awardee in 2004	MPC · 20355
20356 Giopoggiali	1998 HG_{147}	Giovanni Poggiali, Italian planetary scientist at INAF–Astrophysical Observatory of Arcetri working on infrared spectroscopy of asteroids and planetary surfaces.	IAU · 20356
20357 Shireendhir	1998 HP_{147}	Shireen Dhir, a DCYSC awardee in 2004	MPC · 20357
20358 Dalem	1998 HD_{148}	Henri Dalem, French historian, specialist in data processing, and webmaster of the international Holbach foundation	JPL · 20358
20360 Holsapple	1998 JO_{2}	Keith A. Holsapple, American professor of engineering at the University of Washington, who has developed scaling laws for asteroid cratering and explored the relationship between asteroidal shape, spin rates and internal strength	JPL · 20360
20361 Romanishin	1998 JD_{3}	William Romanishin, American professor of astronomy at the University of Oklahoma	JPL · 20361
20362 Trilling	1998 JH_{3}	David E. Trilling, American assistant astronomer at the University of Arizona	JPL · 20362
20363 Komitov	1998 KU_{1}	Boris Petrov Komitov, Bulgarian planetary scientist and popularizer	JPL · 20363
20364 Zdeněkmiler	1998 KC_{5}	Zdeněk Miler, Czech film-maker and illustrator, best known for the character Krtek ("Little Mole") † ‡	MPC · 20364
20366 Bonev	1998 KP_{8}	Boncho P. Bonev, American research assistant professor at the Catholic University of America	JPL · 20366
20367 Erikagibb	1998 KT_{8}	Erika Gibb, American assistant professor in the Department of Physics and Astronomy of the University of Missouri	JPL · 20367
20369 Giuliobaù	1998 KE_{16}	Giulio Baù, Italian mathematician working at the University of Pisa.	IAU · 20369
20370 Gkotsinas	1998 KR_{29}	Anastasios Gkotsinas, Greek researcher.	IAU · 20370
20371 Ekladyous	1998 KE_{30}	Nicholas Samir Ekladyous, a DCYSC awardee in 2004	MPC · 20371
20372 Juliafanning	1998 KS_{35}	Julia Alexine Fanning, a DCYSC awardee in 2004	MPC · 20372
20373 Fullmer	1998 KX_{37}	Austin Tracey Fullmer, a DCYSC awardee in 2004	MPC · 20373
20374 Gomesjunior	1998 KD_{38}	Altair Ramos Gomes Junior, Brazilian adjunct professor at the Federal University of Uberlândia (Brazil), specializing in astrometry, orbital dynamics, and stellar occultations.	IAU · 20374
20375 Sherrigerten	1998 KU_{38}	Sherri Ann Gerten, a DCYSC awardee in 2004	MPC · 20375
20376 Joyhines	1998 KB_{44}	Joy Ellen Hines, a DCYSC awardee in 2004	MPC · 20376
20377 Jakubisin	1998 KX_{46}	Daniel James Jakubisin, a DCYSC awardee in 2004	MPC · 20377
20378 Graykowski	1998 KZ_{46}	Ariel Graykowski, American planetary astronomer and post-doctoral fellow at the SETI institute.	IAU · 20378
20379 Christijohns	1998 KS_{47}	Christine Elizabeth Johns, a DCYSC awardee in 2004	MPC · 20379
20380 Grégoirehenry	1998 KW_{47}	Grégoire Henry, French astrophysicist at the Royal Observatory of Belgium.	IAU · 20380
20381 Hikaruyabuta	1998 KX_{47}	Hikaru Yabuta, Japanese organic cosmochemist who led the analysis of macromolecular organic solids in asteroid 162173 Ryugu samples.	IAU · 20381
20382 Hiroshinaraoka	1998 KW_{49}	Hiroshi Naraoka, Japanese cosmochemist who led the analyses of organic molecules in asteroid 162173 Ryugu samples.	IAU · 20382
20383 Hirotakasawada	1998 KU_{51}	Hirotaka Sawada, Japanese space robotics engineer who led the development of Hayabusa2’s sampling system, which successfully returned about 5 g of material from the C-type asteroid 162173 Ryugu.	IAU · 20383
20384 Hongsuhyim	1998 KW_{51}	Hong-Suh Yim, Korean researcher at the Korea Astronomy and Space Science Institute.	IAU · 20384
20385 Horiuchi	1998 KS_{53}	Shinji Horiuchi, Japanese–Australian radio astronomer affiliated with NASA’s Canberra DSN Complex and CSIRO Astronomy & Space Science.	IAU · 20385
20386 Ianfranchi	1998 KK_{54}	Ian Alan Franchi, British cosmochemist and emeritus professor at The Open University.	IAU · 20386
20387 Iharkacsillik	1998 KP_{54}	Iharka Magdolna Csillik (b. 1975) is a Romanian astronomer at the Astronomical Institute of the Romanian Academy, Cluj-Napoca branch.	IAU · 20387
20388 Ihorkyrylenko	1998 KZ_{54}	Ihor Kyrylenko, Ukrainian astronomer at the Institute of Astronomy, V. N. Karazin Kharkiv National University.	IAU · 20388
20389 Imkedepater	1998 KA_{55}	Imke de Pater, Dutch professor at the University of California in Berkeley.	IAU · 20389
20390 Isabelherreros	1998 KK_{55}	Maria Isabel Herreros Cid, Spanish physicist specializing in the mechanics of fluids and solids and asteroids physics.	IAU · 20390
20391 Ivantsov	1998 KT_{55}	Anatoliy Ivantsov, Ukrainian astronomer at the Royal Observatory of Belgium, specializing in high precision astrometry and orbital mechanics of asteroids.	IAU · 20391
20392 Mikeshepard	1998 MA_{8}	Michael Shepard, American geologist, specializing in radar and optical remote sensing of the minor and terrestrial planets	JPL · 20392
20393 Kevinlane	1998 MZ_{8}	Kevin Nelson Lane, a DCYSC awardee in 2004	MPC · 20393
20394 Fatou	1998 MQ_{17}	Pierre Joseph Louis Fatou (1878–1929) was employed at the observatory of Paris	JPL · 20394
20395 Jacquet	1998 MY_{29}	Emmanuel Jacquet, French cosmochemist, and part of the meteorite collection curatorial team at the Muséum national d’Histoire naturelle in Paris.	IAU · 20395
20396 Jaemannkyeong	1998 MF_{32}	Jaemann Kyeong, Korean researcher at the Korea Astronomy and Space Science Institute.	IAU · 20396
20397 Jamierobinson	1998 MR_{35}	James (Jamie) Robinson, Northern Irish astronomer at the University of Edinburgh and an expert in asteroid observations in large surveys, who has worked with the ATLAS and Vera C. Rubin LSST surveys.	IAU · 20397
20399 Michaelesser	1998 OO	Michael Lesser, American scientist, specialist in high quantum efficiency CCDs	JPL · 20399

== 20401–20500 ==
back to top

Named minor planet	Provisional	This minor planet was named for...	Ref; Catalog
20401 Janghyunpark	1998 OX_{5}	Jang-Hyun Park, Korean astronomer and the ninth president of the Korea Astronomy and Space Science Institute in South Korea.	IAU · 20401
20403 Attenborough	1998 OW_{11}	David Attenborough (born 1927), an English naturalist and broadcaster of wildlife documentaries	JPL · 20403
20404 Javiersuarez	1998 OB_{14}	Javier Suarez, Colombian geologist whose Ph.D. is in planetary geology.	IAU · 20404
20405 Barryburke	1998 QP_{6}	Barry Burke, American CCD sensor designer	JPL · 20405
20406 Jekanthanga	1998 QJ_{13}	Jekan Thanga, American-Canadian engineer who leads the SpaceTREX laboratory, focusing on novel approaches to planetary exploration.	IAU · 20406
20407 Jessicaagarwal	1998 QM_{20}	Jessica Agarwal, German astronomer and planetary scientist at the Technische Universität Braunschweig.	IAU · 20407
20408 Jinbeniyama	1998 QW_{31}	Jin Beniyama, Japanese astronomer who has contributed to observations and characterization studies of near-Earth asteroids, improving our understanding of their properties.	IAU · 20408
20409 Joeychatelain	1998 QP_{43}	Joseph Chatelain, American astronomer and software engineer at Las Cumbres Observatory.	IAU · 20409
20410 Joosangyou	1998 QM_{51}	Joosang You, Korean amateur astronomer and director of the Hwacheon Chou Kyong Chol Observatory.	IAU · 20410
20411 Jooyeongeem	1998 QJ_{69}	Jooyeon Geem, Korean researcher at Luleå University of Technology, Sweden.	IAU · 20411
20412 Josémaríamadiedo	1998 QG_{73}	José María Madiedo, Spanish researcher at the Instituto de Astrofísica de Andalucía.	IAU · 20412
20413 Josephdemartini	1998 QY_{91}	Joseph DeMartini, American scientist who completed his Ph.D. at the University of Maryland in 2025.	IAU · 20413
20415 Amandalu	1998 RL_{61}	Amanda Jane Lu, a DCYSC awardee in 2004	MPC · 20415
20416 Mansour	1998 RR_{65}	Philip George Mansour, a DCYSC awardee in 2004	MPC · 20416
20418 Josephjao	1998 SH_{71}	Joseph S. Jao, American engineer at NASA’s Jet Propulsion Laboratory.	IAU · 20418
20419 Josephlazio	1998 SE_{117}	T. Joseph W. Lazio, American radio astronomer at NASA’s Jet Propulsion Laboratory and Chief Scientist for the Interplanetary Network Directorate.	IAU · 20419
20420 Marashwhitman	1998 SN_{129}	David I. Marash-Whitman, a DCYSC awardee in 2004	MPC · 20420
20421 Joshelliott	1998 TG_{3}	Joshua P. Elliott (b. 1980) is an American software engineer in JPL’s Solar System Dynamics Group whose work supports accurate orbits, ephemerides, and impact-hazard assessments for small bodies.	IAU · 20421
20423 Juanluisrizos	1998 VN_{7}	Juan Luis Rizos Garcia, Spanish researcher at the Instituto de Astrofisica de Andalucia.	IAU · 20423
20426 Fridlund	1998 VW_{44}	Malcolm Fridlund (born 1952) worked at ESA on projects such as Darwin and Corot.	MPC · 20426
20427 Hjalmar	1998 VX_{44}	Hjalmar Lagerkvist (b. 2021), a grandson of the discoverer.	IAU · 20427
20430 Stout	1999 AC_{3}	Earl Douglas Stout (c. 1895–1985), a music professor at Louisiana State University and a great-grandfather of the second discoverer.	JPL · 20430
20433 Prestinenza	1999 CL_{12}	Luigi Prestinenza (born 1929) is a very active, appreciated and popular Italian amateur astronomer.	JPL · 20433
20435 Juliendewit	1999 FU_{28}	Julien de Wit, Belgian planetary scientist and associate professor at the Massachusetts Institute of Technology.	IAU · 20435
20436 Julienserrecourt	1999 GA_{33}	Julien Serrecourt, French public-relations officer at the CNRS Lagrange Laboratory, Côte d’Azur Observatory, France.	IAU · 20436
20437 Selohusa	1999 JH_{1}	The South Euclid–Lyndhurst, Ohio, U.S.A. (SELOHUSA) region is in suburban Cleveland. Euclid bluestone quarries provided building stone for the development of northeast Ohio in the 19th century. NASA astronaut Carl E. Walz and Charles F. Brush, inventor of arc-lamp street lighting, are from the region.	JPL · 20437
20438 Julievermersch	1999 JP_{22}	Julie Vermersch, French dynamicist who studies internal structures of small bodies, in particular main-belt asteroids (MBA).	IAU · 20438
20439 Junghyunjo	1999 JM_{28}	Jung Hyun Jo, Korean researcher at the Korea Astronomy and Space Science Institute.	IAU · 20439
20440 McClintock	1999 JO_{31}	Shannon Noel McClintock, a DCYSC awardee in 2004	MPC · 20440
20441 Elijahmena	1999 JH_{50}	Elijah Login Mena, a DCYSC awardee in 2004	MPC · 20441
20442 Kaiwünnemann	1999 JK_{52}	Kai Wünnemann, German professor at Freie Universität Berlin and the Museum für Naturkunde, Berlin.	IAU · 20442
20444 Mamesser	1999 JK_{63}	Mary Anne Messer, a DCYSC awardee in 2004	MPC · 20444
20445 Kanakosakamoto	1999 JN_{77}	Kanako Sakamoto, Japanese curator at JAXA. She played a key role in developing Hayabusa2’s sampling system and the successful return of the first C-type asteroid samples.	IAU · 20445
20446 Karolinadziadura	1999 JB_{80}	Karolina Jadwiga Dziadura, Polish astronomer who earned her Ph.D. (2024) in planetary astronomy from Adam Mickiewicz University in Poznań.	IAU · 20446
20447 Kateminker	1999 JR_{85}	Kate Minker, American planetary scientist, working on asteroid binary systems.	IAU · 20447
20448 Kathrinaltwegg	1999 JM_{96}	Kathrin Altwegg, Swiss planetary scientist and professor emerita at the University of Bern, renowned for leading the ROSINA instrument on ESA’s Rosetta mission.	IAU · 20448
20449 Katiejoy	1999 JM_{108}	Katherine (Katie) Helen Joy, British geologist and Professor of Lunar and Planetary Sciences at the University of Manchester.	IAU · 20449
20450 Marymohammed	1999 JJ_{111}	Maryam Khadijah Mohammed, a DCYSC awardee in 2004	MPC · 20450
20451 Galeotti	1999 JR_{134}	Piero Galeotti, Italian astrophysicist	JPL · 20451
20452 Kerraouch	1999 KG_{4}	Imene Kerraouch, Algerian postdoctoral fellow at the NASA Johnson Space Center and Lunar and Planetary Institute specializing in the study of chondritic material to reconstruct the evolution of rocky bodies.	IAU · 20452
20453 Kimberleylim	1999 KL_{6}	Kimberley Lim (b. 1990, née Birkett), British scientist and engineer. For her Ph.D. at University College London’s Mullard Space Science Laboratory, she furthered the understanding of comets’ neutral sodium tails through image analysis and simulation studies.	IAU · 20453
20454 Pedrajo	1999 LD_{4}	Ana Cristina Pedrajo, a DCYSC awardee in 2004	MPC · 20454
20455 Pennell	1999 LE_{4}	Jordan William Pennell, a DCYSC awardee in 2004	MPC · 20455
20458 Koshkin	1999 LZ_{21}	Mykola Koshkin, Ukrainian astronomer at the Astronomical Observatory of Odesa I. I. Mechnikov National University.	IAU · 20458
20459 Krzysztoflangner	1999 LO_{26}	Krzysztof Langner, Polish astronomer working on the dynamics of asteroids. His recent research concentrates on the Didymos-Dimorphos binary asteroid system and DART and Hera missions.	IAU · 20459
20460 Robwhiteley	1999 LO_{28}	Robert J. Whiteley, American astronomer	JPL · 20460
20461 Dioretsa	1999 LD_{31}	"Asteroid" backwards, due to retrograde orbit (this is the first such numbered asteroid)	JPL · 20461
20465 Vervack	1999 MJ_{1}	Ronald J. Vervack Jr., American planetary scientist of Johns Hopkins University Applied Physics Laboratory	JPL · 20465
20467 Hibbitts	1999 MX_{1}	Charles A. Hibbitts, American planetary scientist of Johns Hopkins University Applied Physics Laboratory	JPL · 20467
20468 Petercook	1999 NK_{4}	Peter Edward Cook, 20th-century British satirist, writer and comedian performer	JPL · 20468
20469 Dudleymoore	1999 NQ_{4}	Dudley Moore, 20th-century British musician, actor and comedian	JPL · 20469
20470 Kubica	1999 NZ_{5}	Jeremy Kubica, American researcher at the McWilliams Center for Cosmology and Astrophysics at Carnegie Mellon University.	IAU · 20470
20471 Kueny	1999 NK_{6}	Jay Kueny, American astronomer at the University of Arizona’s Wyant College of Optics and Steward Observatory.	IAU · 20471
20472 Mollypettit	1999 NL_{7}	Molly Loren Pettit, a DCYSC awardee in 2004	MPC · 20472
20473 Lainey	1999 NS_{8}	Valéry Lainey, French astronomer at the Paris Observatory.	IAU · 20473
20474 Reasoner	1999 NV_{9}	Jonathan William Reasoner, a DCYSC awardee in 2004	MPC · 20474
20475 Lauraparro	1999 NU_{11}	Laura Martínez Parro, Spanish geologist at the Universidad de Alicante.	IAU · 20475
20476 Chanarich	1999 NH_{12}	Chana Leora Rich, a DCYSC awardee in 2004	MPC · 20476
20477 Anastroda	1999 NQ_{18}	Anastasia Nast Roda, a DCYSC awardee in 2004	MPC · 20477
20478 Rutenberg	1999 NJ_{20}	Michael Lev Rutenberg-Schoenberg, a DCYSC awardee in 2004	MPC · 20478
20479 Celisaucier	1999 NO_{22}	Celine Michelle Saucier, a DCYSC awardee in 2004	MPC · 20479
20480 Antonschraut	1999 NT_{31}	Anton H. Schraut, a DCYSC awardee in 2004	MPC · 20480
20481 Sharples	1999 NW_{37}	David R. Sharples, a DCYSC awardee in 2004	MPC · 20481
20482 Dustinshea	1999 NH_{40}	Dustin James Shea, a DCYSC awardee in 2004	MPC · 20482
20483 Sinay	1999 NK_{41}	Daniella Sinay, a DCYSC awardee in 2004	MPC · 20483
20484 Janetsong	1999 NL_{41}	Janet Song, a DCYSC awardee in 2004	MPC · 20484
20485 Léaferellec	1999 NJ_{54}	Léa Ferellec, French astronomer who gained a Ph.D. from the University of Edinburgh in 2025.	IAU · 20485
20486 Lemos	1999 NU_{56}	Pablo Lemos, Uruguayan astronomer whose research focuses on minor bodies.	IAU · 20486
20487 Lhotka	1999 NJ_{62}	Christoph Lhotka, Austrian professor at the University of Rome Tor Vergata.	IAU · 20487
20488 Pic-du-Midi	1999 OL	Observatoire du Pic-du-Midi.	JPL · 20488
20489 Lissauer	1999 OJ_{2}	Jack J. Lissauer, American scientist at the Ames Research Center.	IAU · 20489
20490 Longobardo	1999 OW_{2}	Andrea Longobardo, Italian planetary scientist at the Istituto Nazionale di Astrofisica.	IAU · 20490
20491 Ericstrege	1999 OA_{5}	Eric William Strege, a DCYSC awardee in 2004	MPC · 20491
20492 Luanaliberato	1999 OC_{5}	Luana Liberato, Brazilian expert in solar-system dynamics.	IAU · 20492
20493 Lutzhecht	1999 OD_{5}	Lutz J. Hecht, German mineralogist at the Museum für Naturkunde Berlin engaged in impact and micrometeorite studies.	IAU · 20493
20495 Rimavská Sobota	1999 PW_{4}	Rimavská Sobota, a small town with a rich history, lies in the Rimava river valley.	JPL · 20495
20496 Jeník	1999 QA_{2}	Jeník is the nickname of the main tenor character in Smetana's The Bartered Bride.	JPL · 20496
20497 Mařenka	1999 RS	Marenka is the nickname of the main soprano character in Smetana's The Bartered Bride.	JPL · 20497
20500 Avner	1999 RP_{3}	Lillian I. Avner (born 1952), Emergency Medicine Physician at Martin Memorial and medical director of Martin County Fire Rescue, dedicated her life to helping people. Lil's passion and leadership guided the ER and Fire Rescue from infancy to maturity. She contributed to thousands of lives saved through her decades of service.	JPL · 20500

== 20501–20600 ==
back to top

Named minor planet	Provisional	This minor planet was named for...	Ref; Catalog
20501 Luxiaoping	1999 RD_{10}	Lu Xiao-Ping, Chinese professor at Macau University of Science and Technology.	IAU · 20501
20502 Madeira	1999 RG_{11}	Gustavo Madeira, Brazilian planetary scientist at the National Observatory of Brazil.	IAU · 20502
20503 Adamtazi	1999 RX_{14}	Adam Ryoma Tazi, a DCYSC awardee in 2004	MPC · 20503
20504 Magbanua	1999 RH_{15}	Mark Jesus Mendoza Magbanua, Filipino-American research scientist at the University of California, San Francisco.	IAU · 20504
20505 Makadia	1999 RE_{16}	Rahil Rajankumar Makadia, American-Indian planetary scientist at the University of Illinois Urbana-Champaign.	IAU · 20505
20506 Mammana	1999 RO_{17}	Luis Mammana, Argentinian vice-director of the El Leoncito Astronomical Complex.	IAU · 20506
20507 Marclaessens	1999 RU_{19}	Marline Claessens, Belgian aerospace engineer at the European Space Agency who contributed to multiple scientific instruments and missions like Comet Interceptor, ExoMars, JUICE, and EnVision.	IAU · 20507
20508 Marekhusárik	1999 RL_{25}	Marek Husárik, Slovak astronomer working at the Astronomical Institute of the Slovak Academy of Sciences.	IAU · 20508
20509 Mariavarela	1999 RL_{26}	María Varela, Argentinean geologist and cosmochemist.	IAU · 20509
20510 Marjoriegalinier	1999 RQ_{26}	Marjorie Galinier, French scientist who contributed to the ESA Gaia mission, improving spectroscopic characterization of asteroids and advancing our knowledge of their composition.	IAU · 20510
20512 Rothenberg	1999 RW_{32}	Eckehard Rothenberg (born 1938), a German amateur astronomer and technical director of the Archenhold Observatory † ‡	MPC · 20512
20513 Lazio	1999 RC_{34}	Lazio is the Italian region containing Rome, the everlasting city.	JPL · 20513
20517 Judycrystal	1999 RB_{35}	Judy Crystal (Andrews) Robinson (born 1949) is married to the discoverer.	JPL · 20517
20518 Rendtel	1999 RC_{36}	Jürgen Rendtel (born 1954), a German solar physicist and amateur astronomer † ‡	MPC · 20518
20522 Yogeshwar	1999 RK_{40}	Ranga Yogeshwar (de) (born 1959), a physicist and scientific journalist.	JPL · 20522
20524 Bustersikes	1999 RJ_{42}	Leon R. Sikes III ("Buster", born 1959), is a Florida businessman and amateur astronomer.	JPL · 20524
20526 Bathompson	1999 RZ_{45}	Blake Alexander Thompson, a DCYSC awardee in 2004	MPC · 20526
20527 Dajowestrich	1999 RO_{48}	David John Westrich, a DCYSC awardee in 2004	MPC · 20527
20528 Kyleyawn	1999 RL_{50}	Kyle James Yawn, a DCYSC awardee in 2004	MPC · 20528
20529 Zwerling	1999 RM_{53}	Blake Gordon Zwerling, a DCYSC awardee in 2004	MPC · 20529
20530 Johnayres	1999 RG_{55}	John Ayres, mentor at the DCYSC in 2004	MPC · 20530
20531 Stevebabcock	1999 RW_{57}	Steven Babcock, mentor at the DCYSC in 2004	MPC · 20531
20532 Benbilby	1999 RL_{64}	R. Ben Bilby, mentor at the DCYSC in 2004	MPC · 20532
20533 Irmabonham	1999 RO_{72}	Irma Bonham, mentor at the DCYSC in 2004	MPC · 20533
20534 Bozeman	1999 RU_{74}	Melissa Bozeman, mentor at the DCYSC in 2004	MPC · 20534
20535 Marshburrows	1999 RV_{74}	Marsha Burrows, mentor at the DCYSC in 2004	MPC · 20535
20536 Tracicarter	1999 RF_{81}	Traci A. Carter, mentor at the DCYSC in 2004	MPC · 20536
20537 Sandraderosa	1999 RO_{82}	Sandra DeRosa, mentor at the DCYSC in 2004	MPC · 20537
20538 Masakifujimoto	1999 RN_{84}	Masaki Fujimoto, Japanese researcher and the Director General of JAXA/ISAS, the science institute of the Japanese space agency.	IAU · 20538
20539 Gadberry	1999 RT_{86}	Sandra Gadberry, mentor at the DCYSC in 2004	MPC · 20539
20540 Marhalpern	1999 RV_{86}	Marcia Halpern, mentor at the DCYSC in 2004	MPC · 20540
20541 Matthewhopkins	1999 RN_{93}	Matthew Hopkins, British astronomer who received his Ph.D. from the University of Oxford in 2025 for his thesis Interstellar Objects in a Galactic Context.	IAU · 20541
20542 Maxwest	1999 RD_{94}	Max West, American researcher at the University of Washington.	IAU · 20542
20543 Michaelfauerbach	1999 RZ_{98}	Michael Fauerbach, German-American Professor of Physics & Astronomy at Florida Gulf Coast University.	IAU · 20543
20544 Kimhansell	1999 RG_{100}	Kim Hansell, mentor at the DCYSC in 2004	MPC · 20544
20545 Karenhowell	1999 RS_{104}	Karen Howell, mentor at the DCYSC in 2004	MPC · 20545
20546 Michaelfrühauf	1999 RA_{105}	Michael Frühauf, German physicist who has worked on determining the flux density of small asteroids coming close to Earth.	IAU · 20546
20547 Michimani	1999 RD_{105}	Jonatan Michimani Garcia, Brazilian planetary scientist presently working at the Observátorio Nacional in Rio de Janeiro (Brazil).	IAU · 20547
20548 Milewski	1999 RM_{107}	Dave Gerald Milewski, American astronomer who worked on active small bodies in the solar system using ground and WISE/NEOWISE observations.	IAU · 20548
20549 Mirelatrelia	1999 RH_{110}	Mirela Madalina Trelia, Romanian astronomer at the Astronomical Institute of the Romanian Academy.	IAU · 20549
20550 Molnar-Bufanda	1999 RX_{110}	Erica Molnar-Bufanda, American astronomer based at the University of Edinburgh.	IAU · 20550
20551 Monikakamińska	1999 RE_{112}	Monika Kamińska, Polish astronomer working at the Astronomical Observatory Institute of Adam Mickiewicz University in Poznań.	IAU · 20551
20552 Moynier	1999 RU_{112}	Frederic Moynier, French cosmochemist who is an expert on volatile element abundances in meteorites and returned samples from asteroids and the Moon.	IAU · 20552
20553 Donaldhowk	1999 RQ_{113}	Donald Howk, mentor at the DCYSC in 2004	MPC · 20553
20554 Myriebe	1999 RU_{112}	My E. I. Riebe, Swedish cosmochemist working in Switzerland.	IAU · 20554
20555 Jennings	1999 RC_{115}	Barbara Jennings, mentor at the DCYSC in 2004	MPC · 20555
20556 Midgekimble	1999 RZ_{115}	Midge Kimble, mentor at the DCYSC in 2004	MPC · 20556
20557 Davidkulka	1999 RB_{116}	David Kulka, mentor at the DCYSC in 2004	MPC · 20557
20558 Natashaalmeida	1999 RN_{117}	Natasha Vasiliki Almeida, Greek-British Senior Curator of Meteorites at the Natural History Museum, London.	IAU · 20558
20559 Sheridanlamp	1999 RJ_{118}	Sheridan Lamp, mentor at the DCYSC in 2004	MPC · 20559
20560 Nežič	1999 RX_{118}	Rok Nežič (born 1991), Slovene scientist and science communicator at Armagh Observatory	MPC · 20560
20561 Noyelles	1999 RE_{120}	Benoît Noyelles, French dynamicist. He took part in the determination of the origin of N2-rich comets, and of the Centaur Echeclus.	IAU · 20561
20562 Oldag	1999 RV_{120}	Drew Oldag, American research software engineer with the LSST Interdisciplinary Network for Collaboration and Computing at the University of Washington.	IAU · 20562
20563 Oliverprice	1999 RG_{121}	Oliver Price, British scientist who researched the large-scale structure of comets’ dust tails for his Ph.D. at University College London’s Mullard Space Science Laboratory.	IAU · 20563
20564 Michaellane	1999 RT_{122}	Michael Lane, mentor at the DCYSC in 2004	MPC · 20564
20565 Oliviermousis	1999 RR_{123}	Olivier Mousis, French astrophysicist who was a professor at AixMarseille Université before becoming a program director at the Southwest Research Institute.	IAU · 20565
20566 Laurielee	1999 RV_{125}	Laurie Lee, mentor at the DCYSC in 2004	MPC · 20566
20567 McQuarrie	1999 RS_{129}	Kerry Ann McQuarrie, mentor at the DCYSC in 2004	MPC · 20567
20568 Migaki	1999 RC_{130}	Janet Migaki, mentor at the DCYSC in 2004	MPC · 20568
20569 Óscarrodríguez	1999 RP_{132}	Óscar Rodríguez del Río, Catalan mathematician.	IAU · 20569
20570 Molchan	1999 RV_{133}	Bonnie Molchan, mentor at the DCYSC in 2004	MPC · 20570
20571 Tiamorrison	1999 RA_{135}	Tiana Morrison, mentor at the DCYSC in 2004	MPC · 20571
20572 Celemorrow	1999 RN_{137}	Celeste Morrow, mentor at the DCYSC in 2004	MPC · 20572
20573 Garynadler	1999 RW_{137}	Gary Nadler, mentor at the DCYSC in 2004	MPC · 20573
20574 Ochinero	1999 RZ_{139}	Marcia Collin Ochinero, mentor at the DCYSC in 2004	MPC · 20574
20575 Panicucci	1999 RL_{142}	Paolo Panicucci, Italian space engineer and professor with expertise in small-body autonomous satellite exploration and celestial body characterization.	IAU · 20575
20576 Marieoertle	1999 RG_{148}	Marie Oertle, mentor at the DCYSC in 2004	MPC · 20576
20577 Paolomartino	1999 RM_{148}	Paolo Martino, Italian engineer at the European Space Agency (ESA) who was the spacecraft manager of the ESA Hera planetary defense mission to the asteroid Didymos and the program manager of the ESA RAMSES mission to the asteroid Apophis.	IAU · 20577
20578 Parisot	1999 RH_{149}	Jérôme Parisot, French research engineer specializing in assembly, integration and tests activities for space instruments for over 30 years.	IAU · 20578
20579 Pavelzigo	1999 RX_{149}	Pavel Zigo, Slovak electrotechnical engineer and astronomer of the Astronomical and Geophysical Observatory in Modra, Comenius University Bratislava.	IAU · 20579
20580 Marilpeters	1999 RG_{151}	Marilyn Peters, mentor at the DCYSC in 2004	MPC · 20580
20581 Prendergast	1999 RQ_{152}	Dana Prendergast, mentor at the DCYSC in 2004	MPC · 20581
20582 Reichenbach	1999 RP_{154}	Edith Reichenbach, mentor at the DCYSC in 2004	MPC · 20582
20583 Richthammer	1999 RK_{158}	James Richthammer, mentor at the DCYSC in 2004	MPC · 20583
20584 Brigidsavage	1999 RP_{159}	Brigid Savage, mentor at the DCYSC in 2004	MPC · 20584
20585 Wentworth	1999 RG_{160}	Sandra Wentworth, mentor at the DCYSC in 2004	MPC · 20585
20586 Elizkolod	1999 RR_{160}	Elizabeth Kolod, an ISEF awardee in 2004	MPC · 20586
20587 Jargoldman	1999 RD_{162}	Jarett Goldman, an ISEF awardee in 2004	MPC · 20587
20588 Pavolmatlovič	1999 RM_{166}	Pavol Matlovič, Slovak astronomer at Comenius University Bratislava.	IAU · 20588
20589 Hennyadmoni	1999 RQ_{168}	Henny Admoni, an ISEF awardee in 2004	MPC · 20589
20590 Bongiovanni	1999 RN_{172}	Brice Bongiovanni, an ISEF awardee in 2004	MPC · 20590
20591 Sameergupta	1999 RC_{177}	Sameer Gupta, an ISEF awardee in 2004	MPC · 20591
20592 Payne	1999 RV_{177}	Matthew J. Payne, English planetary scientist.	IAU · 20592
20593 Freilich	1999 RM_{180}	Janet Freilich, an ISEF awardee in 2004	MPC · 20593
20594 Pemartin	1999 RP_{183}	Pierre-Etienne Martin, French planetary scientist at the University of Bern.	IAU · 20594
20595 Ryanwisnoski	1999 RT_{188}	Ryan Wisnoski, an ISEF awardee in 2004	MPC · 20595
20596 Pfalzner	1999 RX_{188}	Susanne Pfalzner, German astrophysicist at Forschungszentrum Jülich, specializing in numerical studies of stellar dynamics.	IAU · 20596
20597 Pickersgill	1999 RA_{192}	Annemarie Pickersgill, Canadian planetary scientist at the Scottish Universities Environmental Research Centre.	IAU · 20597
20598 Pilat-Lohinger	1999 RO_{194}	Elke Pilat-Lohinger, Austrian planetary scientist at the University of Vienna and TU Graz.	IAU · 20598
20599 Pisarčíková	1999 RD_{196}	Adriana Pisarčíková, Slovak planetary scientist at the Astronomical Institute of the Czech Academy of Sciences.	IAU · 20599
20600 Danieltse	1999 RC_{197}	Daniel Tse, an ISEF awardee in 2004	MPC · 20600

== 20601–20700 ==
back to top

Named minor planet	Provisional	This minor planet was named for...	Ref; Catalog
20601 Qasimafghan	1999 RD_{197}	Qasim Afghan, British scientist who studied cometary dust tails at University College London’s Mullard Space Science Laboratory in pursuit of his Ph.D.	IAU · 20601
20602 Qichengzhang	1999 RC_{198}	Qicheng Zhan, Chinese-American astronomer working at Lowell Observatory in Flagstaff who earned his Ph.D. from Caltech in 2023.	IAU · 20602
20603 Rafaelribeiro	1999 RT_{199}	Rafael Ribeiro, Brazilian Assistant Professor at São Paulo State University.	IAU · 20603
20604 Vrishikpatil	1999 RW_{205}	Vrishikumar Patil, an ISEF awardee in 2004	MPC · 20604
20605 Rambaux	1999 RX_{209}	Nicolas Rambaux, French dynamicist working on the internal structure, the rotation and tidal evolution of many solar system objects: the Moon, the Martian satellites Phobos and Deimos, main-belt asteroids, trans-Neptunian objects (Pluto, Haumea, Quaoar), among others.	IAU · 20605
20606 Widemann	1999 RM_{214}	Thomas Widemann (born 1961), French planetary scientist at the Paris Observatory and associate professor at Versailles University	JPL · 20606
20607 Vernazza	1999 RR_{219}	Pierre Vernazza (born 1979), planetary scientist at the European Space Agency's European Space Research and Technology Centre in Noordwijk	JPL · 20607
20608 Fredmerlin	1999 RH_{224}	Frédéric Merlin (born 1981), French planetary scientist at the Observatoire de Paris	JPL · 20608
20610 Franciswilliams	1999 RK_{235}	Francis Williams (1690–1770), Jamaican astronomer, poet and polymath.	JPL · 20610
20613 Chibaken	1999 RE_{240}	Chiba prefecture is located east of Tokyo.	JPL · 20613
20614 Renner	1999 RX_{209}	Stéfan Renner, French astronomer and associate professor at the University of Lille and Paris Observatory.	IAU · 20614
20616 Zeeshansayed	1999 SH_{6}	Zeeshan Sayed, an ISEF awardee in 2004	MPC · 20616
20617 Richardgreenwood	1999 SA_{7}	Richard Greenwood, English senior research fellow at The Open University who specializes in using oxygen isotopic analyses of extraterrestrial material to understand the origin and early evolution of the Solar System.	IAU · 20617
20618 Daniebutler	1999 SG_{7}	Danielle Butler, an ISEF awardee in 2004	MPC · 20618
20623 Davidyoung	1999 TS_{11}	David Young (born 1955), American amateur astronomer	JPL · 20623
20624 Dariozanetti	1999 TB_{12}	Dario Zanetti (born 1959), Swiss artisan, who helped build the discovering Gnosca Observatory	MPC · 20624
20625 Noto	1999 TG_{20}	The Noto Peninsula is located in Japan's geographical center, facing the Sea of Japan.	JPL · 20625
20626 Rider-Stokes	1999 TH_{21}	Ben Gabriel Rider-Stokes, English post-doctoral researcher at The Open University specializing in understanding the timing of magmatic differentiation and volatile accretion of achondrites.	IAU · 20626
20629 Robert	1999 TB_{90}	Vincent Robert, French professor at IPSA and researcher at Paris observatory.	IAU · 20629
20631 Stefuller	1999 TW_{91}	Stephen Fuller, an ISEF awardee in 2004 ‡	MPC · 20631
20632 Carlyrosser	1999 TC_{92}	Carly Rosser, an ISEF awardee in 2004	MPC · 20632
20633 Robertluther	1999 TU_{93}	Robert Luther, German scientist at the Museum für Naturkunde Berlin.	IAU · 20633
20634 Marichardson	1999 TP_{94}	Matthew Richardson, an ISEF awardee in 2004	MPC · 20634
20635 Robinandrews	1999 TV_{96}	Robin George Andrews, British science journalist, who obtained his Ph.D. in the study of volcanology.	IAU · 20635
20636 Romanhirsch	1999 TC_{97}	Roman Hirsch, Polish astronomer working at the Astronomical Observatory Institute of Adam Mickiewicz University in Poznań.	IAU · 20636
20637 Rosemarydorsey	1999 TX_{103}	Rosemary C. Dorsey, New Zealand astronomer and a postdoctoral researcher at the University of Helsinki in Finland.	IAU · 20637
20638 Lingchen	1999 TV_{108}	Ling Chen, an ISEF awardee in 2004	MPC · 20638
20639 Michellouie	1999 TD_{109}	Michelle Louie, an ISEF awardee in 2004	MPC · 20639
20641 Yenuanchen	1999 TF_{121}	Yen Uan-Chen, an ISEF awardee in 2004, and IFAA recipient †	MPC · 20641
20642 Laurajohnson	1999 TC_{124}	Laura Johnson, an ISEF awardee in 2004	MPC · 20642
20643 Angelicaliu	1999 TK_{142}	Angelica Liu, an ISEF awardee in 2004	MPC · 20643
20644 Amritdas	1999 TN_{144}	Amrit Das, an ISEF awardee in 2004	MPC · 20644
20645 Ryderstrauss	1999 TH_{149}	Ryder H. Strauss, American astronomer who received his Ph.D. from Northern Arizona University in 2025.	IAU · 20645
20646 Nikhilgupta	1999 TM_{150}	Nikhil Gupta, an ISEF awardee in 2004	MPC · 20646
20647 Ryujiokazaki	1999 TQ_{155}	Ryuji Okazaki, Japanese noble gas cosmochemist who contributed to instrument development, curation, and analysis for JAXA’s Hayabusa and Hayabusa2 missions.	IAU · 20647
20648 Ryukihyodo	1999 TF_{166}	Ryuki Hyodo, Japanese planetary scientist specializing in giant impacts simulation, the formation of small bodies and the origin of planetary rings in the Solar System.	IAU · 20648
20649 Miklenov	1999 TP_{170}	Mikhail Klenov, an ISEF awardee in 2004	MPC · 20649
20650 Saillenfest	1999 TG_{173}	Melaine Saillenfest, French researcher at the Paris Observatory.	IAU · 20650
20654 Ivánéder	1999 TO_{247}	Iván Éder (born 1979), an astrophotographer from Budapest, Hungary.	MPC · 20654
20656 Samuelgrant	1999 TX_{258}	Samuel Grant, British scientist based at the Finnish Meteorological Institute, Helsinki.	IAU · 20656
20657 Alvarez-Candal	1999 TL_{261}	Alvaro Alvarez-Candal, Argentinian planetary scientist at the Observatoire de Paris.	JPL · 20657
20658 Bushmarinov	1999 TY_{270}	Ivan Bushmarinov, an ISEF awardee in 2004	MPC · 20658
20664 Senec	1999 UV_{4}	The town of Senec is located in the south-west of Slovakia. The historical development of the town is dated from the middle of the 13th century. Senec actively supports amateur astronomy. In 1982 an astronomical observatory was built on the building of Albert Molnár Szenczi Elementary School.	JPL · 20664
20673 Janelle	1999 VW	Janelle Burgardt (born 1954), secretary and past president of the North East Kansas Amateur Astronomer's League.	JPL · 20673
20685 Sánchez-Cano	1999 VX_{48}	Beatriz Sánchez-Cano, Spanish-British planetary scientist at the University of Leicester (UK).	IAU · 20685
20686 Thottumkara	1999 VX_{54}	Arun Thottumkara, an ISEF awardee in 2004	MPC · 20686
20687 Saletore	1999 VQ_{60}	Yogesh Saletore, an ISEF awardee in 2004	MPC · 20687
20688 Sandroricardo	1999 VR_{62}	Sandro Ricardo de Souza, Brazilian high-school teacher in the state of Espírito Santo, Brazil.	IAU · 20688
20689 Zhuyuanchen	1999 VF_{63}	Zhu Yuanchen, an ISEF awardee in 2004	MPC · 20689
20690 Crivello	1999 VY_{66}	Joseph Crivello, an ISEF awardee in 2004	MPC · 20690
20693 Ramondiaz	1999 VV_{81}	Jose Ramon Diaz Navarrete, an ISEF awardee in 2004	MPC · 20693
20695 Santiagoiglesias	1999 VM_{92}	Santiago Iglesias Alvarez, Spanish researcher at the Institute of Space Sciences and Technologies of Asturias at the University of Oviedo, Spain.	IAU · 20695
20696 Torresduarte	1999 VJ_{95}	Luis Eduardo Torres Duarte, an ISEF awardee in 2004	MPC · 20696
20700 Saraheanderson	1999 VG_{145}	Sarah E. Anderson, French-American planetary scientist currently at the Laboratoire d’Astrophysique de Marseille.	IAU · 20700

== 20701–20800 ==
back to top

Named minor planet	Provisional	This minor planet was named for...	Ref; Catalog
20701 Sébastiencharnoz	1999 VL_{179}	Sébastien Charnoz, French planetary scientist specializing in the formation of small bodies and the origin of moons and rings in the Solar System.	IAU · 20701
20711 Seijisugita	1999 XF_{12}	Seiji Sugita, Japanese planetary scientist who led remote-sensing studies of asteroid Ryugu with optical cameras on JAXA’s Hayabusa2 spacecraft.	IAU · 20711
20712 Shashiganesh	1999 XF_{13}	Shashikiran Ganesh, Indian astronomer.	IAU · 20712
20713 Sheward	1999 XA_{32}	Daniel Sheward, a British planetary scientist whose work focuses on the detection of fresh impact craters on the Moon.	IAU · 20713
20715 Shijianchun	1999 XB_{44}	Shi Jianchun, Chinese astronomer at the Shanghai Astronomical Observatory, Chinese Academy of Sciences.	IAU · 20715
20717 Shogotachibana	1999 XG_{93}	Shogo Tachibana, Japanese cosmochemist conducting laboratory experiments on chemical reactions in space.	IAU · 20717
20718 Šilha	1999 XZ_{97}	Jiří Šilha, Slovak astronomer at the Faculty of Mathematics, Physics and Informatics, Comenius University in Bratislava, Slovakia.	IAU · 20718
20719 Velasco	1999 XL_{99}	Rodrigo Velasco Velasco, an ISEF awardee in 2004	MPC · 20719
20722 Aaronclevenson	1999 XZ_{109}	Aaron Clevenson (b. 1955), a retired astronomy professor at Lone Star College-Montgomery in Texas and the Observatory Director for the Insperity Observatory in the Humble Independent School District.	IAU · 20722
20723 Siltala	1999 XH_{113}	Lauri Siltala, innish astronomer whose Ph.D. research developed novel methods for asteroid mass and density estimation using Gaia astrometry and close encounters.	IAU · 20723
20725 Juliuscsotonyi	1999 XP_{120}	Julius Thomas Csotonyi, renowned Canadian paleoartist and naturalhistory illustrator	IAU · 20725
20729 Opheltius	1999 XS_{143}	Opheltius, Achean killed by Hector.	JPL · 20729
20730 Jorgecarvano	1999 XC_{151}	Jorge Carvano (born 1971), Brazilian planetary scientist at the Rio de Janeiro National Observatory	JPL · 20730
20731 Mothédiniz	1999 XH_{151}	Thais Mothé-Diniz (born 1974), Brazilian planetary scientist at the Rio de Janeiro National Observatory	JPL · 20731
20732 Snedeker	1999 XB_{167}	Lawrence G. Snedeker, American engineer at the Goldstone Deep Space Communications Complex.	IAU · 20732
20733 Sophiejacquinod	1999 XE_{168}	Sophie Jacquinod, French research engineer at the Paris Observatory, specializing in scientific computing and data processing pipelines.	IAU · 20733
20734 Sriramsaran	1999 XA_{169}	Sriram Saran Bhiravarasu, an Indian planetary scientist at the Indian Space Research Organisation.	IAU · 20734
20735 Stetzler	1999 XU_{169}	Steven G. Stetzler, American astronomer at NASA’s Jet Propulsion Laboratory, working on asteroid photometry, data pipelines, and software development as part of the Solar System Dynamics group.	IAU · 20735
20736 Sultana	1999 XV_{170}	Robin Sultana, French planetary scientist at the LIRA-Paris Observatory.	IAU · 20736
20737 Sungkicho	1999 XJ_{189}	Sungki Cho, Korean researcher at the Korea Astronomy and Space Science Institute.	IAU · 20737
20740 Sémery	1999 XB_{228}	Alain Sémery (born 1944), French engineer at the Paris Observatory	JPL · 20740
20741 Jeanmichelreess	1999 XA_{230}	Jean-Michel Reess (born 1967), French engineer at the Paris Observatory	JPL · 20741
20743 Sunhojin	2000 AR_{6}	Sunho Jin, Korean researcher at the Korea Astronomy and Space Science Institute, South Korea.	IAU · 20743
20744 Susannewampfler	2000 AO_{151}	Susanne Wampfler, Swiss astronomer.	IAU · 20744
20745 Sylvainlodiot	2000 AS_{185}	Sylvain Lodiot, French engineer at the European Space Agency.	IAU · 20745
20746 Tadashi	2000 AL	Tadashi Yokoyama, Brazilian researcher who worked at São Paulo State University-Brazil.	IAU · 20746
20747 Tanialepivert	2000 AM_{186}	Tania LePivert-Jolivet, French researcher at the Instituto de Astrofísica de Canarias (Spain).	IAU · 20747
20748 Thamirissantana	2000 AP_{186}	Thamiris de Santana, Brazilian researcher at São Paulo State University and an expert in Solar System dynamics.	IAU · 20748
20749 Tiscareno	2000 AD_{199}	Matthew S. Tiscareno, American planetary scientist at the SETI Institute.	IAU · 20749
20750 Tomášpaulech	2000 AF_{199}	Tomáš Paulech, Slovak astronomer and director of the Astronomical and Geophysical Observatory in Modra, Comenius University Bratislava.	IAU · 20750
20751 Tomnordheim	2000 AA_{200}	Tom Nordheim, Norwegian planetary scientist based at Johns Hopkins Applied Physics Laboratory, USA.	IAU · 20751
20752 Topputo	2000 AP_{200}	Francesco Topputo, Italian professor at Politecnico di Milano.	IAU · 20752
20754 Urbaník	2000 AD_{244}	Marián Urbaník, Slovak amateur astronomer, astrophotographer and active NEOCP astrometric observer at Kysuce Observatory (Kysucké Nové Mesto, Slovakia).	IAU · 20754
20755 Valériegodard	2000 BX_{6}	Valérie Godard, French thin-section producer (litholamelist) at Le Laboratoire Géosciences Paris-Saclay.	IAU · 20755
20757 Veerlesterken	2000 CV_{52}	Veerle Sterken, Belgian space scientist and expert on the topic of interstellar dust within our Solar System.	IAU · 20757
20758 Veras	2000 CS_{94}	Dimitri Veras, American-British theoretical astrophysicist based in the UK.	IAU · 20758
20759 Vienne	2000 CX_{96}	Alain Vienne, French professor at Lille University.	IAU · 20759
20760 Chanmatchun	2000 DR_{8}	Mat Chun Chan, the discoverer's mother	JPL · 20760
20762 Wargnier	2000 EE_{36}	Antonin Wargnier, French planetary scientist who works at the Japan Aerospace Exploration Agency.	IAU · 20762
20764 Witasse	2000 FE_{38}	Olivier Witasse, French scientist working at ESA in the Netherlands.	IAU · 20764
20765 Yifeijiao	2000 JC_{40}	Yifei Jiao, Chinese planetary scientist currently at University of California at Santa Cruz.	IAU · 20765
20766 Yoonsoobach	2000 PK_{11}	Yoonsoo P. Bach, Korean researcher at the Korea Astronomy and Space Science Institute, South Korea.	IAU · 20766
20767 Younkiljung	2000 PN_{24}	Youn Kil Jung, Korean researcher at the Korea Astronomy and Space Science Institute.	IAU · 20767
20768 Langberg	2000 QO_{54}	Sarah Langberg, an ISEF awardee in 2004	MPC · 20768
20769 Yücelkiliç	2000 QM_{65}	Yücel Kiliç, Turkish astronomer who is currently a postdoctoral fellow at the Andalucia Institute of Astrophysics (Spain).	IAU · 20769
20770 Yumoto	2000 QT_{123}	Koki Yumoto, Japanese planetary scientist at the Japan Aerospace Exploration Agency.	IAU · 20770
20771 Yurimoto	2000 QY_{150}	Hisayoshi Yurimoto, Japanese cosmochemist who has made innovative developments in isotope microscopes.	IAU · 20771
20772 Brittajones	2000 QL_{182}	Britta Jones, an ISEF awardee in 2004	MPC · 20772
20773 Aneeshvenkat	2000 QS_{208}	Aneesh Venkat, an ISEF awardee in 2004	MPC · 20773
20774 Zender	2000 RP_{3}	Joe Zender, German planetary scientist based at the European Space Agency in the Netherlands.	IAU · 20774
20775 Zhaohaibin	2000 RU_{9}	Zhao Haibin, Chinese astronomer at the Purple Mountain Observatory, Chinese Academy of Sciences.	IAU · 20775
20776 Juliekrugler	2000 RG_{10}	Julie Krugler, an ISEF awardee in 2004	MPC · 20776
20777 Zhouwenhan	2000 RX_{10}	Wen-Han Zhou, Chinese scientist who completed his Ph.D. at Côte d’Azur Observatory in 2024 (Nice, France).	IAU · 20777
20778 Wangchaohao	2000 RD_{11}	Wang Chaohao, an ISEF awardee in 2004	MPC · 20778
20779 Xiajunchao	2000 RN_{11}	Xia Junchao, an ISEF awardee in 2004	MPC · 20779
20780 Chanyikhei	2000 RO_{11}	Chan Yik Hei (born 1989), an ISEF awardee in 2004	MPC · 20780
20782 Markcroce	2000 RZ_{52}	Mark Croce, an ISEF awardee in 2004	MPC · 20782
20781 Znášik	2000 RX_{38}	Miroslav Znášik, Slovak scientist and former director of the Regional Observatory in Žilina (1986–2012).	IAU · 20781
20783 Zurigray	1999 LB_{18}	Zuri Gray (born 1997), a Spanish-Irish researcher at the University of Helsinki	MPC · 20783
20784 Trevorpowers	2000 RN_{56}	Trevor Powers, an ISEF awardee in 2004	MPC · 20784
20785 Mitalithakor	2000 RO_{60}	Mitali Thakor, an ISEF awardee in 2004	MPC · 20785
20786 San Sebastian	2000 RG_{62}	Irina San Sebastian, Argentinian planetary scientist.	IAU · 20786
20787 Mitchfourman	2000 RZ_{71}	Mitchell Fourman, an ISEF awardee in 2004	MPC · 20787
20788 Le Montagner	2000 SB_{29}	Roman Le Montagner, French research engineer	IAU · 20788
20789 Hughgrant	2000 SU_{44}	Hugh M. Grant (born 1933), Canadian amateur astronomer and a member of the Royal Astronomical Society of Canada	MPC · 20789
20791 de Kleer	2000 SH_{60}	Katherine R. de Kleer, American planetary scientist and professor of planetary science at the California Institute of Technology.	IAU · 20791
20792 De Cicco	2000 SH_{88}	Marcelo Antonio Barros De Cicco, Brazilian planetary scientist at the Instituto Nacional de Metrologia, Qualidade e Tecnologia (Brazil).	IAU · 20792
20793 Goldinaaron	2000 SF_{118}	Aaron Goldin, an ISEF awardee in 2004	MPC · 20793
20794 Ryanolson	2000 SD_{161}	Ryan Olson, an ISEF awardee in 2004	MPC · 20794
20796 Philipmunoz	2000 SN_{169}	Philip Munoz, an ISEF awardee in 2004, and IFAA and EUCYSA recipient	MPC · 20796
20798 Verlinden	2000 SH_{172}	Christopher Verlinden, an ISEF awardee in 2004, and IFAA and EUCYSA recipient	MPC · 20798
20799 Ashishbakshi	2000 SU_{172}	Ashish Bakshi, an ISEF awardee in 2004	MPC · 20799

== 20801–20900 ==
back to top

Named minor planet	Provisional	This minor planet was named for...	Ref; Catalog
20804 Etter	2000 SW_{209}	Dolores M. Etter is renowned for lifetime achievement in digital signal processing and contributions to science education.	JPL · 20804
20809 Eshinjolly	2000 SW_{259}	Eshin Jolly, an ISEF awardee in 2004	MPC · 20809
20812 Shannonbabb	2000 SL_{269}	Shannon Babb, an ISEF awardee in 2004	MPC · 20812
20813 Aakashshah	2000 SB_{274}	Aakash Shah, an ISEF awardee in 2004	MPC · 20813
20814 Laurajones	2000 SW_{292}	Laura Jones, an ISEF awardee in 2004	MPC · 20814
20817 Liuxiaofeng	2000 TT_{50}	Liu Xiaofeng, an ISEF awardee in 2004	MPC · 20817
20818 Karmadiraju	2000 TQ_{54}	Kartik Madiraju, an ISEF awardee in 2004	MPC · 20818
20821 Balasridhar	2000 UT_{5}	Balaji Sridhar, an ISEF awardee in 2004	MPC · 20821
20822 Lintingnien	2000 UK_{7}	Lin Ting-Nien, an ISEF awardee in 2004	MPC · 20822
20823 Liutingchun	2000 UZ_{7}	Liu Ting-Chun, an ISEF awardee in 2004	MPC · 20823
20828 Linchen	2000 UO_{27}	Lin Chen, an ISEF awardee in 2004	MPC · 20828
20830 Luyajia	2000 UG_{45}	Lu Yajia, an ISEF awardee in 2004, and IFAA recipient	MPC · 20830
20831 Zhangyi	2000 UM_{47}	Yi-Chen "Lilly" Zhang, an ISEF awardee in 2004	MPC · 20831
20832 Santhikodali	2000 UQ_{47}	Santhisri Kodali, an ISEF awardee in 2004	MPC · 20832
20834 Allihewlett	2000 UM_{48}	Allison Hewlett, an ISEF awardee in 2004	MPC · 20834
20835 Eliseadcock	2000 UY_{49}	Elise Adcock, an ISEF awardee in 2004	MPC · 20835
20836 Marilytedja	2000 UE_{51}	Marilynn Tedja, an ISEF awardee in 2004	MPC · 20836
20837 Ramanlal	2000 UX_{52}	Nimish Ramanlal, an ISEF awardee in 2004	MPC · 20837
20839 Bretharrison	2000 US_{55}	Brett Harrison, an ISEF awardee in 2004	MPC · 20839
20840 Borishanin	2000 UF_{58}	Boris Hanin, an ISEF awardee in 2004	MPC · 20840
20843 Kuotzuhao	2000 UZ_{78}	Kuo Tzu-Hao, an ISEF awardee in 2004	MPC · 20843
20846 Liyulin	2000 US_{103}	Li Yu-Lin, an ISEF awardee in 2004	MPC · 20846
20850 Gaglani	2000 VF_{2}	Shiv Gaglani, an ISEF awardee in 2004	MPC · 20850
20851 Ramachandran	2000 VA_{8}	Reshma Ramachandran, an ISEF awardee in 2004	MPC · 20851
20852 Allilandstrom	2000 VY_{12}	Allison Landstrom, an ISEF awardee in 2004	MPC · 20852
20853 Yunxiangchu	2000 VQ_{13}	Yun Xiang Chu, an ISEF awardee in 2004	MPC · 20853
20854 Tetruashvily	2000 VH_{27}	Mazell Tetruashvily, an ISEF awardee in 2004, and IFAA recipient	MPC · 20854
20855 Arifawan	2000 VV_{27}	Arif Awan, an ISEF awardee in 2004	MPC · 20855
20856 Hamzabari	2000 VT_{28}	Hamza Bari, an ISEF awardee in 2004	MPC · 20856
20857 Richardromeo	2000 VA_{30}	Richard Romeo, an ISEF awardee in 2004	MPC · 20857
20858 Cuirongfeng	2000 VM_{31}	Cui Rongfeng, an ISEF awardee in 2004	MPC · 20858
20861 Lesliebeh	2000 VX_{34}	Leslie Beh, an ISEF awardee in 2004	MPC · 20861
20862 Jenngoedhart	2000 VY_{34}	Jennifer Goedhart, an ISEF awardee in 2004	MPC · 20862
20863 Jamescronk	2000 VW_{35}	James Cronk, an ISEF awardee in 2004	MPC · 20863
20870 Kaningher	2000 VC_{48}	Laura Kaningher, an ISEF awardee in 2004	MPC · 20870
20873 Evanfrank	2000 VH_{49}	Evan Frank, an ISEF awardee in 2004	MPC · 20873
20874 MacGregor	2000 VL_{49}	Meredith MacGregor, an ISEF awardee in 2004	MPC · 20874
20878 Uwetreske	2000 VH_{50}	Uwe Treske, an ISEF awardee in 2004, and IFAA, and Seaborg SIYSS Award recipient	MPC · 20878
20879 Chengyuhsuan	2000 VJ_{55}	Cheng Yu-hsuan, an ISEF awardee in 2004	MPC · 20879
20880 Yiyideng	2000 VE_{57}	Yiyi Deng, an ISEF awardee in 2004	MPC · 20880
20882 Paulsánchez	2000 VH_{57}	Diego Paul Sánchez Lana (born 1976) has applied the physics of granular mechanics to the study of rubble pile asteroids. His work has identified the possible source of asteroid cohesive strength and shown that it plays a fundamental role in the spin fission of asteroids and their pathways to binary asteroid formation.	JPL · 20882
20883 Gervais	2000 VD_{58}	Raphaël Gervais, an ISEF awardee in 2004, and MILSET Expo-Science Europe Award recipient † ‡	MPC · 20883
20887 Ngwaikin	2000 WP_{2}	Ng Wai Kin (born 1974) is one of the pioneers in lunar and planetary imaging using webcam.	JPL · 20887
20888 Siyueguo	2000 WB_{14}	Si Yue Guo, an ISEF awardee in 2004, and MILSET Expo-Science Europe Award recipient †	MPC · 20888
20892 MacChnoic	2000 WE_{75}	Breandan Mac Chnoic, an ISEF awardee in 2004	MPC · 20892
20893 Rosymccloskey	2000 WJ_{75}	Roisin McCloskey, an ISEF awardee in 2004	MPC · 20893
20894 Krumeich	2000 WP_{93}	Edwin Krumeich, an ISEF awardee in 2004	MPC · 20894
20896 Tiphene	2000 WW_{141}	Didier Tiphène (born 1957), French deputy director of the Laboratoire d'études spatiales et d'instrumentation en astrophysique at the Observatoire de Paris	JPL · 20896
20897 Deborahdomingue	2000 WR_{142}	Deborah L. Domingue (born 1963), American planetary scientist at Johns Hopkins University Applied Physics Laboratory, who has worked on the NEAR space mission and is deputy project scientist for the MESSENGER mission	JPL · 20897
20898 Fountainhills	2000 WE_{147}	Fountain Hills, Arizona, home of the Fountain Hills Observatory	JPL · 20898

== 20901–21000 ==
back to top

Named minor planet	Provisional	This minor planet was named for...	Ref; Catalog
20901 Mattmuehler	2000 XO_{6}	Matthew Muehler, an ISEF awardee in 2004	JPL · 20901
20902 Kylebeighle	2000 XY_{6}	Kyle Beighle, an ISEF awardee in 2004	JPL · 20902
20936 Nemrut Dagi	4835 T-1	Nemrut Dagi, the volcano in Turkey.	JPL · 20936
20947 Polyneikes	2638 T-2	Son of Oedipus, who was to alternate kingship over Thebes with his brother Eteokles. This led to the war of the Seven against Thebes.	JPL · 20947
20952 Tydeus	5151 T-2	Son of Oeneus, killed in the war of the Seven against Thebes	JPL · 20952
20961 Arkesilaos	1973 SS_{1}	King Arkesilaos of Cyrene	JPL · 20961
20962 Michizane	1977 EW_{7}	Sugawara no Michizane (845-903) was a noble, a scholar, a politician and a Kanshi poet. He is admired for his calligraphy, scholarship and poetry.	JPL · 20962
20963 Pisarenko	1977 QN_{1}	Georgij Stepanovitsch Pisarenko, member of the International Academy of Culture †	MPC · 20963
20964 Mons Naklethi	1977 UA	First known name of Mount Kleť, in the Czech Republic, where the discovering Kleť Observatory is located	MPC · 20964
20965 Kutafin	1978 SJ_{7}	Oleg Emel'yanovich Kutafin, Russian rector of the Moscow State Academy of Law	JPL · 20965
20969 Samo	1979 SH	Samo, French merchant and founder of the first Bohemian state † ‡ +	MPC · 20969
20990 Maryannehervey	1983 RL_{3}	Mary Anne Hervey (1796-1838), wife of Fearon Fallows, an English astronomer at the Royal Observatory, Cape of Good Hope.	MPC · 20990
20991 Jánkollár	1984 WX_{1}	Ján Kollár, Slovak poet, priest and diligent promoter of Slavic culture †	MPC · 20991
20992 Marypearse	1985 RV_{2}	Mary Pearse (1802-1861), wife of Thomas Maclear.	MPC · 20992
20993 Virginiediscry	1985 RX_{2}	Marie-Virginie Discry (1812-1865), wife of Jean-Charles Houzeau.	MPC · 20993
20994 Atreya	1985 TS	Prakash Atreya (born 1985), a meteor astronomer and programming specialist at the Arecibo Observatory.	JPL · 20994
20996 Pandrosion	1986 PB	Pandrosion of Alexandria (fl. 4th century BC), mathematician who possibly developed an approximate method for doubling the cube.	JPL · 20996
20998 Houzeaudelehaie	1986 QF_{1}	Charles Auguste Benjamin Hippolyte Houzeau de Lehaie (1832-1922), younger brother of Jean-Charles Houzeau.	MPC · 20998
21000 L'Encyclopédie	1987 BY_{1}	The Encyclopédie or Dictionnaire raisonné des sciences, des arts et des métiers (1751–1772), by Diderot and d´Alembert, may be considered the principal work of the Age of Enlightenment.	JPL · 21000

back to top

Preceded by 19,001–20,000	Meanings of minor-planet names List of minor planets: 20,001–21,000	Succeeded by 21,001–22,000
