= 20325 Julianoey =

Asteroid binary

Discovery
- Discovered by: Spacewatch
- Discovery site: Kitt Peak National Obs.
- Discovery date: 21 April 1998

Designations
- Named after: Julian Oey (Australian photometrist)
- Alternative designations: 1998 HO_{27} · 1977 TT_{6} 2004 BB_{159}
- Minor planet category: main-belt · Vestian background

Orbital characteristics
- Epoch 4 September 2017 (JD 2458000.5)
- Uncertainty parameter 0
- Observation arc: 63.43 yr (23,169 days)
- Aphelion: 2.5620 AU
- Perihelion: 2.1956 AU
- Semi-major axis: 2.3788 AU
- Eccentricity: 0.0770
- Orbital period (sidereal): 3.67 yr (1,340 days)
- Mean anomaly: 338.89°
- Mean motion: 0° 16^{m} 6.96^{s} / day
- Inclination: 6.1000°
- Longitude of ascending node: 98.173°
- Argument of perihelion: 257.30°
- Known satellites: 1 (D: 1.42 km; P:23.54 h)

Physical characteristics
- Dimensions: 4.73 (derived); 4.942±0.216 km 6.81 km (calculated)
- Synodic rotation period: 3.24474±0.0008 h
- Geometric albedo: 0.20 (assumed); 0.416±0.044
- Spectral type: S (assumed)
- Absolute magnitude (H): 13.10 · 13.2 · 13.29±0.39

20325 Julianoey (provisional designation 1998 HO_{27}) is a Vestian asteroid and a synchronous binary system from the inner regions of the asteroid belt, approximately 5 kilometers (3 miles) in diameter. It was discovered on 21 April 1998, by astronomers of the Spacewatch survey at Kitt Peak National Observatory near Tucson, Arizona. The asteroid was named after Australian photometrist Julian Oey. The discovery of its minor-planet moon was announced in December 2014.

== Orbit and classification ==
Julianoey is a member of the Vesta family (401), the second largest family in the asteroid belt, named after 4 Vesta. However, it is a non-family asteroid of the main belt's background population when applying the Hierarchical Clustering Method to its proper orbital elements.

It orbits the Sun in the inner asteroid belt at a distance of 2.2–2.6 AU once every 3 years and 8 months (1,340 days; semi-major axis of 2.38 AU). Its orbit has an eccentricity of 0.08 and an inclination of 6° with respect to the ecliptic. The body's observation arc begins with a precovery taken at Palomar Observatory in May 1954, almost 44 years prior to its official discovery observation at Kitt Peak.

== Physical characteristics ==
Julianoey is an assumed stony S-type asteroid.

=== Rotation period ===
In December 2014, a rotational lightcurve of Julianoey was obtained from photometric observations by Donald Pray and several other astronomers across the world. Lightcurve analysis gave a well-defined rotation period of 3.24474 hours with a brightness amplitude of 0.13 magnitude (U=3).

=== Satellite ===
The photometric observations from December 2014 also revealed that Julianoey is a synchronous binary asteroid with a minor-planet moon orbiting it every 23.54 hours. The satellite measures approximately 1.42 kilometers in diameter and its orbit has an estimated semi-major axis of 10 kilometers. The discovery was announced on 24 December 2014.

=== Diameter and albedo ===
According to the survey carried out by the NEOWISE mission of NASA's Wide-field Infrared Survey Explorer, Julianoey measures 4.942 kilometers in diameter and its surface has a high albedo of 0.416. The Collaborative Asteroid Lightcurve Link assumes a standard albedo for stony asteroids of 0.20 and consequently calculates a larger diameter of 6.81 kilometers based on an absolute magnitude of 13.2.

== Numbering and naming ==
This minor planet was numbered on 9 January 2001 (M.P.C. 41904). It was named after Julian Oey (born 1964), a well-known asteroid photometrist, observing from Australia. He was the principal investigator that led to the discovery of four binary asteroids: 2691 Sersic, 3868 Mendoza, 10208 Germanicus and 15268 Wendelinefroger.

As of 2017, he is also credited as co-discoverer of the following binary asteroids: 1338 Duponta, 1798 Watts, 2121 Sevastopol, 2343 Siding Spring, 2478 Tokai, 4541 Mizuno, 5112 Kusaji, 5481 Kiuchi, 6186 Zenon, 8306 Shoko, 8474 Rettig, 12326 Shirasaki, (15700) 1987 QD, (32039) 2000 JO_{23}, (99913) 1997 CZ_{5} and (357439) 2004 BL86.

The naming was suggested by astronomers Alan Harris and Petr Pravec. The official naming citation was published by the Minor Planet Center on 5 June 2016 (M.P.C. 100606; listed on 20 June 2016).

== See also ==
- Minor-planet moon § Asteroid belt
