= Gitanjali Rao (inventor) =

American inventor (born 2005)

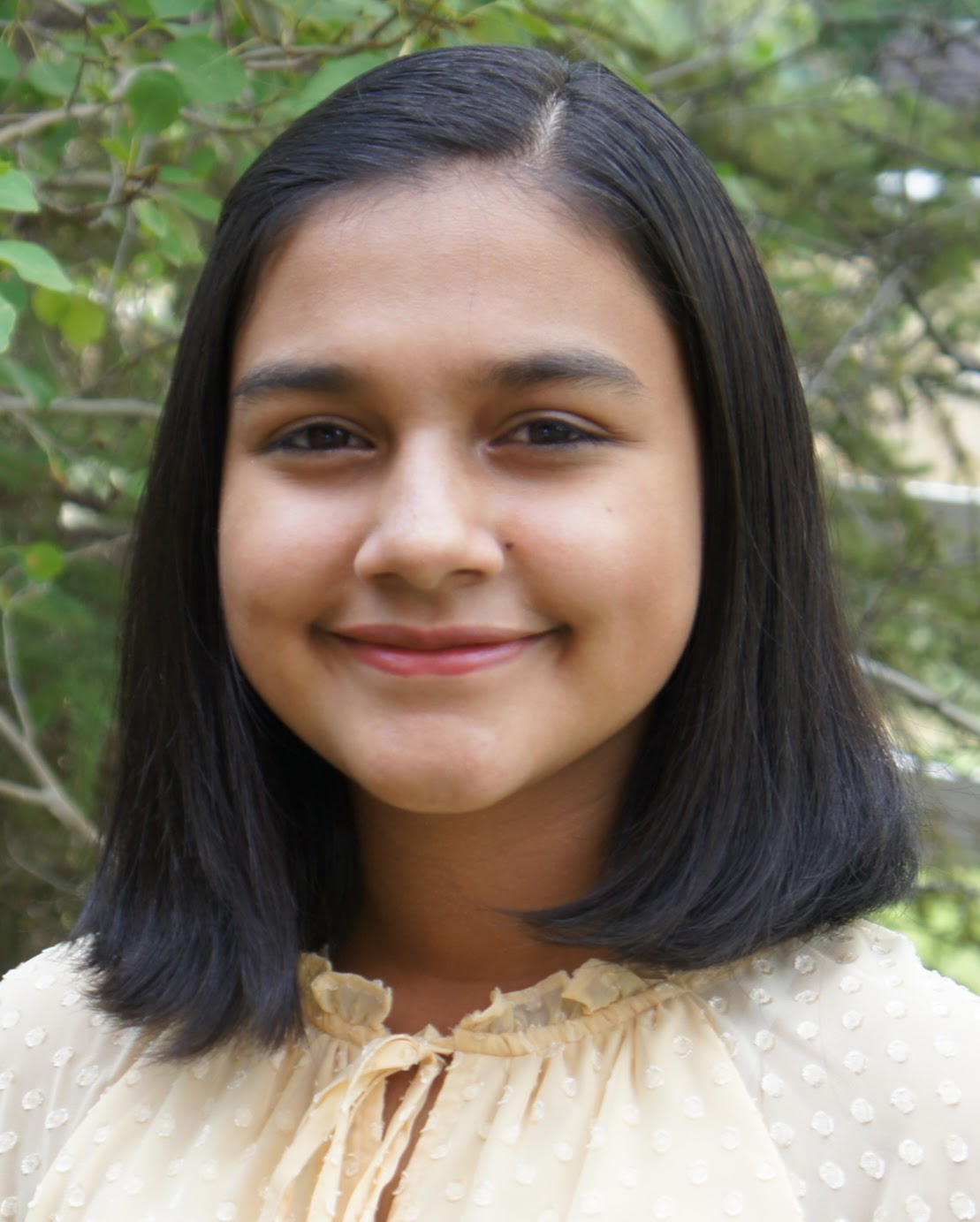
- Gitanjali Rao in 2020
- Born: November 19, 2005 (age 20); Ohio, U.S.
- Education: Massachusetts Institute of Technology (currently enrolled)
- Known for: Water lead-level measuring device (2018)
- Awards: Time's 2020 Kid of the Year; Discovery Education 3M Young Scientist Challenge (2017)

Gitanjali Rao is an American inventor, author, social activist, and a STEM student and advocate.

Rao won the Discovery Education 3M Young Scientist Challenge in 2017 and was recognized on Forbes 30 Under 30 for her innovations. Rao was named Time's top young innovator of 2020 for her innovations and "innovation workshops" she conducts across the globe and, on December 4, 2020, was featured on the cover of Time and named their first "Kid of the Year".

== Early life ==
Rao was born on November 19, 2005, in Ohio to parents Bharathi and Ram Rao. She later moved to Lone Tree, Colorado and attended STEM School Highlands Ranch.

Rao is of Indian descent. She enjoys Indian classical dancing and classical music.

As of 2025, she is studying biological engineering at MIT.

== Inventions ==
=== Tethys ===
Rao was first influenced by a science kit her uncle gave to her when she was 4 years old. When she was 10, she heard about the Flint water crisis while watching the news and became interested in ways to measure the lead content in water. This led to her using App Inventor to develop a device called Tethys which was based on carbon nanotubes that could send water quality information via Bluetooth. She collaborated with a research scientist at 3M and worked in the Denver Water Quality Research Lab. and in 2017, she won the Discovery Education 3M Young Scientist Challenge and was awarded $25,000 for her invention, Tethys.

Tethys contains a 9-volt battery, a lead sensing unit, a Bluetooth extension and a processor. It uses carbon nanotubes, whose resistance changes in the presence of lead. She learned about the carbon nanotubes while reading the Massachusetts Institute of Technology website. She plans to work with scientists and medical professionals to investigate the potential of Tethys as a viable method.

She presented her idea at the 2018 MAKERS Conference and raised a further $25,000. As of January 2019, she was working with the Denver water facility and planned to have a prototype within two years. She has a patent for the invention and was awarded the EPA Presidential Award for it.

=== Epione ===
In 2019, Rao developed a diagnostic tool called Epione for early diagnosis of prescription opioid addiction. Gitanjali had submitted this medical device as her Technovation Girls submission. This portable device uses sample imaging to detect elevated levels of proteins that correspond to high levels of opioids.

=== Kindly ===
Rao developed an app named "Kindly" that uses artificial intelligence that can detect cyberbullying at an early stage; she has partnered with UNICEF to roll-out the service globally.

== Other works ==
Rao became a self-published author at age ten, publishing Baby Brother Wonders, which she wrote and illustrated.

Rao is a three-time TEDx speaker and is passionate about sharing her love of STEM. She has given over 200 talks and workshops in more than 40 countries. She conducts innovation workshops for students throughout the globe in partnership with after school clubs, schools, science museums, STEM organizations and other educational organizations to promote a problem-solving curriculum for K-12 students.

As of 2020, she is a member of Scouts and has enrolled in the Scouting STEM program in the United States.

In 2021, Rao published her book, Young Inventor's Guide to STEM, which elaborates on her 5 Steps To Problem-Solving For Students, Educators, and Parents. Sections of the book have been adapted for school use in Kenya and Uganda.

In 2023, Rao enrolled at MIT and gained her pilot's license; in 2024, she plans to publish her second book, A Young Innovators Guide to Planning For Success.

During the summer of 2024, Gitanjali plans to conduct research and work at the Koch Institute for Integrative Cancer Research at MIT. At the institute, she plans to work on the development of extended release vaccines.

== Awards and recognition ==
In 2017, Rao won the Discovery Education 3M Young Scientist Challenge. The Middle Tennessee Council of the Boy Scouts of America recognized her as its STEM Scout of the Year in 2017. These honors led to her inclusion in the delegation for the 2017 BSA Report to the Nation.

In 2018, Rao was awarded the United States Environmental Protection Agency President's Environmental Youth Award.

In 2019, Rao was recognized on Forbes 30 Under 30 in the science category. She was awarded the Top "Health" Pillar Prize for the TCS Ignite Innovation Student Challenge in May 2019 for developing a diagnostic tool called Epione based on advances in genetic engineering for early diagnosis of prescription opioid addiction.

In 2020, Time named her the top young innovator. She was also the first person to be named Time magazine's Kid of the Year.

In 2021, Rao was honored as a Laureate of the Young Activists Summit at UN Geneva.

In 2025, Rao received the first Starmus Stephen Hawking Junior Medal for Science Communications.

She received the Muhammad Ali Humanitarian and Martin Luther King Junior Humanitarian awards for her services to children in refugee camps.
