= Anika Chebrolu =

Indian American child scientist (born 2006)

Anika Chebrolu, born in 2006, is an Indian American child prodigy in the field of medical science. She is best known for winning the title of "America's Top Young Scientist" in Discovery Education 3M Young Scientist Challenge for young scientists in 2020.

== Life and career ==
Chebrolu is from Frisco, Texas. She attended Independence High School. In 2019, after recovering from influenza, Cherbrolu developed an interest in treating viral diseases. In addition, Cherbrolu's grandfather was a chemistry professor which also sparked an early interest in science.

In 2020, as a 14 year old freshman, she won the 3M Young Scientist Challenge and $25,000. Although Anika's project originally aimed to find a treatment for the influenza virus, after the pandemic she refocused her research to COVID-19. Her work uses in-silico methodology to find lead molecules that can selectively bind to the spike protein of the SARS-CoV-2 virus. These discovered molecules are able to hinder the spread of the virus into human body cells.

Currently she is in her second year at University of Pennsylvania and is majoring in neuroscience. She currently works at Arkitekt Ventures, a firm focused on biotechnology.Mahfuza Ali, was her mentor, she helped Chebrolu shift her research from influenza to SARS-CoV-2.

== Awards ==
- America's Top Young Scientist of the Year, 2020
- Teen Vogue's 21 Under 21, 2020
