= 3868 Mendoza =

Vestian asteroid and binary system

Discovery
- Discovered by: C. J. van Houten; I. van Houten G. T. Gehrels
- Discovery site: Palomar Obs.
- Discovery date: 24 September 1960

Designations
- Named after: Eugenio Mendoza (Mexican astronomer)
- Alternative designations: 4575 P-L · 1935 SA_{1} 1952 HV_{3} · 1953 TD_{2} 1977 KD_{1}
- Minor planet category: main-belt · Vesta

Orbital characteristics
- Epoch 4 September 2017 (JD 2458000.5)
- Uncertainty parameter 0
- Observation arc: 62.81 yr (22,941 days)
- Aphelion: 2.5649 AU
- Perihelion: 2.1032 AU
- Semi-major axis: 2.3341 AU
- Eccentricity: 0.0989
- Orbital period (sidereal): 3.57 yr (1,302 days)
- Mean anomaly: 353.29°
- Mean motion: 0° 16^{m} 35.04^{s} / day
- Inclination: 8.1076°
- Longitude of ascending node: 171.57°
- Argument of perihelion: 186.20°
- Known satellites: 1

Physical characteristics
- Dimensions: 8.628±0.157 km 6.37±0.27 km 9.351±0.049 km 9.396 km 9.40 km (taken)
- Synodic rotation period: 2.77082±0.00005 h 2.77090±0.00005 h 2.77099±0.00002 h 2.77103±0.00003 h
- Geometric albedo: 0.1621±0.0288; 0.1649; 0.218±0.032; 0.436±0.076
- Spectral type: S
- Absolute magnitude (H): 12.30±0.04 (R) · 12.30±0.02 (R) 12.5 · 12.6 · 12.70±0.37 · 12.71±0.04 · 12.75

3868 Mendoza, provisional designation 4575 P-L is a stony Vestian asteroid and binary system from the inner regions of the asteroid belt, approximately 9 kilometers in diameter. It was discovered on 24 September 1960, by astronomers Cornelis Johannes van Houten, Ingrid van Houten-Groeneveld and Tom Gehrels at Palomar Observatory.

== Orbit and characterization ==
Mendoza orbits the Sun at a distance of 2.1–2.6 AU once every 3 years and 7 months (1,302 days). Its orbit has an eccentricity of 0.10 and an inclination of 8° with respect to the ecliptic.

=== Satellite ===
In 2009, a minor-planet moon was discovered. The satellite measures 2.01±0.18 km in diameter and orbits Mendoza in a little more than a day.

=== Palomar–Leiden ===
The survey designation "P-L" stands for Palomar–Leiden, named after Palomar Observatory and Leiden Observatory, which collaborated on the fruitful Palomar–Leiden survey in the 1960s. Gehrels used Palomar's Samuel Oschin telescope (also known as the 48-inch Schmidt Telescope), and shipped the photographic plates to Ingrid and Cornelis van Houten at Leiden Observatory where astrometry was carried out. The trio are credited with the discovery of several thousand asteroid discoveries.

=== Diameter and albedo ===
According to the survey carried out by NASA's Wide-field Infrared Survey Explorer (WISE) with its subsequent NEOWISE mission, Mendoza measures between 8.628 and 9.351 kilometers in diameter and its surface has an albedo between 0.1621 and 0.436. The Collaborative Asteroid Lightcurve Link adopts Petr Pravec's revised WISE data, that is, an albedo of 0.1649 and a rounded diameter of 9.40 kilometers with an absolute magnitude of 12.71.

== Naming ==
This minor planet was named in honor of Mexican astronomer Eugenio Mendoza (born 1928), expert in photometry and spectroscopy, member of the IAU and teacher at several Mexican universities. The approved naming citation was published by the Minor Planet Center on 1 September 1993 (M.P.C. 22499).
