= Guillaume Blanchard =

Guillaume Blanchard (1650 – 1716) was an early settler at Annapolis Royal, Nova Scotia at a site on the Petitcodiac River. He was involved in a struggle over land and seigneurial rights for the settlers of the area. The settlers lost any hopes of seigneurial rights in a legal decision but did retain their homesteads. The Blanchards of the area all descend from this pioneer.
