= 15268 Wendelinefroger =

Stony, spheroidal, and binary main-belt asteroid

Discovery
- Discovered by: E. W. Elst
- Discovery site: La Silla Obs.
- Discovery date: 18 November 1990

Designations
- Named after: Wendeline Froger (Belgian singer)
- Alternative designations: 1990 WF_{3} · 1979 WA_{7} 1986 PO_{5} · 1999 CD_{133}
- Minor planet category: main-belt · (inner); Nysa–Polana complex

Orbital characteristics
- Epoch 4 September 2017 (JD 2458000.5)
- Uncertainty parameter 0
- Observation arc: 37.29 yr (13,619 days)
- Aphelion: 2.9209 AU
- Perihelion: 1.8107 AU
- Semi-major axis: 2.3658 AU
- Eccentricity: 0.2346
- Orbital period (sidereal): 3.64 yr (1,329 days)
- Mean anomaly: 171.04°
- Mean motion: 0° 16^{m} 15.24^{s} / day
- Inclination: 2.7540°
- Longitude of ascending node: 144.06°
- Argument of perihelion: 210.29°
- Known satellites: 1 (Note: Central Bureau for Astronomical Telegrams - No.1542, 20 October 2008 Photometric observations obtained between 24 September and 9 October 2008, showed that 15268 Wendelinefroger is a binary system with an orbital period of 25.07±0.02 hours. The primary has a rotation period of 2.4224±0.0001 hours, with a lightcurve brightness variation of 0.07 magnitude, indicating a nearly spheroidal shape. Mutual eclipse/occultation events give a lower limit on the D_{s}/D_{p} of 0.27 (i.e. a secondary-to-primary mean-diameter ratio). Reported by – J. Oey, Leura Observatory, N.S.W., Australia; P. Pravec, P. Kusnirak, and K. Hornoch, Ondrejov Observatory; R. Stephens, Goat Mountain Astronomical Research Station, Yucca Valley, CA, U.S.A.; S. Gajdos and L. Kornos, Modra Observatory; and V. Chiorny, Institute of Astronomy, Kharkiv National University, Electronic Telegram No. 1542)

Physical characteristics
- Dimensions: 3.41 km (calculated)
- Synodic rotation period: 2.4224±0.0001 h
- Geometric albedo: 0.20 (assumed)
- Spectral type: S
- Absolute magnitude (H): 14.7 · 14.82±0.04

15268 Wendelinefroger (provisional designation 1990 WF_{3}) is a stony, spheroidal, and binary asteroid from the inner regions of the asteroid belt, approximately 3.4 kilometers in diameter.

It was discovered on 18 November 1990, by Belgian astronomer Eric Elst at ESO's La Silla Observatory in northern Chile, and named after Belgian singer Wendeline Froger.

== Naming ==
This minor planet is named in honour of Belgian female singer Wendeline Froger (born 1948), who has a soprano voice and performs at church celebrations, weddings and for selected audiences at her residence. She has a preference to sing Lieder by Robert Schumann, after whom the minor planet 4003 Schumann is named. The approved naming citation was published by the Minor Planet Center on 12 December 2008 (M.P.C. 64563).

== Orbit ==
The S-type asteroid orbits the Sun in the inner main belt at a distance of 1.8–2.9 astronomical units (AU) once every 3 years and 8 months (1,329 days). Its orbit has an eccentricity of 0.23 and an inclination of 3° with respect to the ecliptic. It was first identified as 1979 WA_{7} at Crimea–Nauchnij in 1979, extending the asteroid's observation arc by 11 years prior to its discovery.

== Physical characteristics ==
=== Primary ===
In October 2008, a rotational lightcurve was obtained from photometric observations at the Leura Observatory (E17), Australia. It gave a rotation period of 2.422 hours with a low brightness variation of 0.07 magnitude, which indicates that the asteroid is of nearly spheroidal shape (U=3). The Collaborative Asteroid Lightcurve Link (CALL) assumes a standard albedo for stony asteroids of 0.20 and calculates a diameter of 3.4 kilometer with an absolute magnitude of 14.7.

=== Secondary ===
During the photometric observations in 2008, a minor-planet moon was also discovered, orbiting Wendelinefroger every 25.07±0.02 hours at a distance of 8.7 kilometers. Based on mutual occultations of Wendelinefroger and its moon, the diameter ratio for the two bodies is at least 0.24 (i.e. secondary-to-primary mean diameter ratio), which translates into an estimated diameter of 0.8 kilometer or more for the asteroid's moon, using CALL's calculated diameter for the primary.
