= Discovery Education 3M Young Scientist Challenge =

The 3M Young Scientist Challenge is a youth science and engineering competition administered by Discovery Education and 3M for middle school students in the United States, similar to the European Union Contest for Young Scientists. Students apply by creating a 1-2 minute video detailing their idea for a new invention intended to solve an everyday problem. Ten finalists are chosen annually to work alongside a 3M scientist during a summer mentorship and receive a trip to the 3M Innovation Center in St. Paul, Minnesota, to compete for $25,000 and the title of America's Top Young Scientist.

== Selection process ==
The entry period is from December until April each year. A panel of judges from Discovery Education and its partner organizations, educators, and science professionals score qualifying entry videos and choose 10 finalists and up to 51 merit winners, one from each state and the District of Columbia, based on the following criteria:

- Creativity (ingenuity and innovative thinking) (30%)
- Scientific knowledge (30%)
- Persuasiveness and effective communication (20%)
- Overall presentation (20%)

Students are required to address an everyday problem and articulate how the problem directly impacts them, their families, their communities, and/or the global population. The idea must be a new innovation or solution, and cannot be a behavioral change or a new use for an existing product. Judges also look for the level of understanding of scientific concepts and confidence in communicating science in general exhibited in the videos.

The ten finalists undergo a summer mentorship and in the fall travel to 3M's headquarters in Minnesota to participate in the Young Scientist Challenge Final Event. They visit 3M labs, meet 3M scientists, and tour the 3M Innovation Center, and also participate in a series of other scored challenges to demonstrate their scientific knowledge and communication abilities. For their final challenge, they then present the innovation that they developed during their mentorship. Here the finalists are judged by a panel of judges selected by Discovery Education and its partner organizations according to the following guidelines:

- Creativity (ingenuity and innovative thinking) demonstrated in the presentation (30%)
- Scientific knowledge demonstrated in the presentation (20%)
- Effective use of a 3M technology in the innovation (10%)
- Ranking from the Final Event's scored scientific challenges (40%)

After the Final Event, participants attend an award ceremony and dinner, at which the winner of the title "America’s Top Young Scientist" is announced.

=== Prizes ===
First Place (America's Top Young Scientist)

- $25,000
- A destination trip
- Contest trophy

Two Runner-Up Prize winners

- A destination trip

Seven Second Prize winners

- "Excitations" for a $500 excursion

Minor Planets Named After Finalists

- NASA Jet Propulsion Laboratory Small Body Database

Up to 51 Merit Winners (one from each state and the District of Columbia)

- 3M Innovation Prize Packs

== History ==
Formerly known as the Discovery Channel Young Scientist Challenge (DCYSC), the 3M Young Scientist Challenge was created in 1999 as an engineering research and exhibit competition for students in grades 5 through 8. It was sponsored primarily by Discovery Communications, Society for Science and the Public, and Elmer's Glue. Competitors were originally qualified for DCYSC by entering an International Science and Engineering-affiliated science fair and being nominated by a teacher or professional.

Students completed an application that included several essays, which were then evaluated for communication abilities by DCYSC judges, who selected 400 semi-finalists and 40 finalists who received an all-expense-paid trip to Washington, D.C. to compete in the final competition. The finals consisted of two parts. The first was a research presentation, accounting for 20% of the total score, held at the Smithsonian's National Museum of Natural History, the National Academy of Sciences, or another academic national association that varied from year to year. The second was a series of six science-related challenges at the National Institutes of Health or the University of Maryland. Each challenge concluded with some type of presentation (e.g., a radio show, a TV show, or a news conference) worth 10% of the students' total score. Students also presented a simple science experiment, known as a Whelmer, in front of cameras for 15% of their score. The remaining 5% came from teamwork, as the finalists were split into eight teams consisting of five members each for the science challenges.

In 2008, the contest became the Discovery Education 3M Young Scientist Challenge. Students no longer have to be nominated and now submit a 1-2 minute video clip as their form of entry.

In 2017, Gitanjali Rao from Colorado won the top award for work on a lead detection in drinking water system. In 2018, Rishab Jain from Oregon won the Grand Award for a pancreatic cancer deep learning system. Kara Fan from San Diego won the 2019 top prize, with a nano-particle bandage concept. She made an anti-bacterial bandage with a silver particle solution to win the 2019 3M Young Scientist Challenge. In 2020, 14-year-old Anika Chebrolu from Frisco, Texas won the 3M Young Scientist Challenge, due to her endeavor to identify the spike protein of the SARS-CoV-2. In 2021, Sarah Park from Jacksonville, Florida won the Top Prize and the America's Top Young Scientist title by creating the Spark Care+, a music therapy treatment device for mental health disorders that uses AI, galvanic skin response for sweat gland response, and photoplethysmography (PPG) for heart rate monitoring.

== Challenge themes ==
Since 2003, themes for the Young Scientist Challenge have followed scientific curiosities and been built on the activities and innovations around them.

- In 2003, the activities were based on the 100th anniversary of the first flight of the Wright Brothers on December 17, 1903, and included a reproduction of the Wright Brother's 1901 wind tunnel and lift balance, which allowed contestants to test various wing designs for lift, and rocket-propelled go carts powered by compressed carbon dioxide gas.
- In 2004, the activities were based on the 100th anniversary of Einstein's Theory of Relativity, celebrated in the World Year of Physics 2005.
- In 2005, inspired by the events of Hurricane Katrina and the 2004 Indonesian tsunami, the activities were about understanding natural disasters and included a 20-foot tall vortex (tornado) generator, a 40-foot tsunami wave tank simulator, and procedures to safely dispose of biological waste after a natural disaster.
- In 2006, the activities were based on the theme "Disease Detectives" inspired by the H5N1 avian influenza scare. Contestants participated in virtual colonoscopy screening, mold identification and remediation, and avian flu containment using herd immunity models.
- In 2008, the activities centered on NASA-themed challenges. Finalists met NASA scientists and had the opportunity to work in a 1/6th gravity simulation, attempt a repair to the Hubble Space Telescope, and look for water on Mars.
- In 2009, the finalists went through four rounds of challenges based on the theme "The Science of Everyday Life".
- In 2010, activities focused on ways to keep humans safe. Contestants were judged on their knowledge of science and their ability to apply it to areas of safety and security.

== See also ==
- Intel International Science and Engineering Fair
