= List of minor planets: 12001–13000 =

The following is a partial list of minor planets, running from minor-planet number 12001 through 13000, inclusive. The primary data for this and other partial lists is based on JPL's "Small-Body Orbital Elements" and data available from the Minor Planet Center. Critical list information is also provided by the MPC, unless otherwise specified from Lowell Observatory. A detailed description of the table's columns and additional sources are given on the main page including a complete list of every page in this series, and a statistical break-up on the dynamical classification of minor planets.

Also see the summary list of all named bodies in numerical and alphabetical order, and the corresponding naming citations for the number range of this particular list. New namings may only be added to this list after official publication, as the preannouncement of names is condemned by the Working Group for Small Bodies Nomenclature of the International Astronomical Union.

Near-Earth obj.	MBA (inner)	MBA (outer)	Centaur
Mars-crosser	MBA (middle)	Jupiter trojan	Trans-Neptunian obj.
Unclassified

== 12001–12100 ==
Designation			Discovery			Properties		Ref
Permanent	Provisional	Named after	Date	Site	Discoverer(s)	Category	Diam.	Ref
12001 Gasbarini	1996 ED_{9}	Gasbarini	March 12, 1996	Kitt Peak	Spacewatch	·	12 km	MPC · JPL
12002 Suess	1996 FR_{1}	Suess	March 19, 1996	Ondřejov	P. Pravec, L. Kotková	EOS	6.3 km	MPC · JPL
12003 Hideosugai	1996 FM_{5}	Hideosugai	March 20, 1996	Nanyo	T. Okuni	CYB	23 km	MPC · JPL
12004	1996 JW_{1}	—	May 15, 1996	Haleakalā	NEAT	·	11 km	MPC · JPL
12005 Delgiudice	1996 KA_{3}	Delgiudice	May 19, 1996	Socorro	R. Weber	·	19 km	MPC · JPL
12006 Hruschka	1996 OO	Hruschka	July 20, 1996	Ondřejov	L. Kotková	3:2	19 km	MPC · JPL
12007 Fermat	1996 TD_{7}	Fermat	October 11, 1996	Prescott	P. G. Comba	·	2.5 km	MPC · JPL
12008 Kandrup	1996 TY_{9}	Kandrup	October 11, 1996	Catalina	T. B. Spahr	moon	10 km	MPC · JPL
12009	1996 UE	—	October 16, 1996	Ōizumi	T. Kobayashi	·	2.6 km	MPC · JPL
12010 Kovářov	1996 UN	Kovářov	October 18, 1996	Kleť	J. Tichá, M. Tichý	·	2.5 km	MPC · JPL
12011	1996 VT_{5}	—	November 14, 1996	Ōizumi	T. Kobayashi	V	2.8 km	MPC · JPL
12012 Kitahiroshima	1996 VH_{8}	Kitahiroshima	November 7, 1996	Kitami	K. Endate, K. Watanabe	·	3.5 km	MPC · JPL
12013 Sibatahosimi	1996 VU_{8}	Sibatahosimi	November 7, 1996	Kitami	K. Endate, K. Watanabe	·	2.6 km	MPC · JPL
12014 Bobhawkes	1996 VX_{15}	Bobhawkes	November 5, 1996	Kitt Peak	Spacewatch	NYS	4.7 km	MPC · JPL
12015	1996 WA	—	November 16, 1996	Ōizumi	T. Kobayashi	·	2.9 km	MPC · JPL
12016 Green	1996 XC	Green	December 1, 1996	Prescott	P. G. Comba	·	8.0 km	MPC · JPL
12017	1996 XC_{1}	—	December 2, 1996	Ōizumi	T. Kobayashi	·	3.2 km	MPC · JPL
12018	1996 XJ_{15}	—	December 10, 1996	Xinglong	SCAP	·	3.3 km	MPC · JPL
12019	1996 XF_{19}	—	December 8, 1996	Ōizumi	T. Kobayashi	·	3.1 km	MPC · JPL
12020	1996 XW_{19}	—	December 11, 1996	Ōizumi	T. Kobayashi	·	6.1 km	MPC · JPL
12021	1996 XX_{19}	—	December 12, 1996	Ōizumi	T. Kobayashi	·	2.7 km	MPC · JPL
12022 Hilbert	1996 XH_{26}	Hilbert	December 15, 1996	Prescott	P. G. Comba	·	3.0 km	MPC · JPL
12023	1996 YJ	—	December 20, 1996	Ōizumi	T. Kobayashi	V	2.5 km	MPC · JPL
12024	1996 YN_{2}	—	December 28, 1996	Ōizumi	T. Kobayashi	·	2.6 km	MPC · JPL
12025	1997 AJ_{1}	—	January 2, 1997	Ōizumi	T. Kobayashi	·	4.5 km	MPC · JPL
12026	1997 AV_{1}	—	January 3, 1997	Ōizumi	T. Kobayashi	·	5.0 km	MPC · JPL
12027 Masaakitanaka	1997 AB_{5}	Masaakitanaka	January 3, 1997	Chichibu	N. Satō	·	4.7 km	MPC · JPL
12028 Annekinney	1997 AK_{7}	Annekinney	January 9, 1997	Ōizumi	T. Kobayashi	EUN	4.2 km	MPC · JPL
12029	1997 AQ_{22}	—	January 11, 1997	Xinglong	SCAP	DOR	12 km	MPC · JPL
12030	1997 BF_{3}	—	January 30, 1997	Ōizumi	T. Kobayashi	·	2.9 km	MPC · JPL
12031 Kobaton	1997 BY_{4}	Kobaton	January 30, 1997	Chichibu	N. Satō	·	4.6 km	MPC · JPL
12032 Ivory	1997 BP_{5}	Ivory	January 31, 1997	Prescott	P. G. Comba	·	2.9 km	MPC · JPL
12033 Anselmo	1997 BD_{9}	Anselmo	January 31, 1997	Cima Ekar	M. Tombelli, U. Munari	THM	10 km	MPC · JPL
12034	1997 CR	—	February 1, 1997	Ōizumi	T. Kobayashi	EUN	5.9 km	MPC · JPL
12035 Ruggieri	1997 CP_{13}	Ruggieri	February 1, 1997	Pianoro	V. Goretti	·	5.7 km	MPC · JPL
12036	1997 CR_{19}	—	February 11, 1997	Ōizumi	T. Kobayashi	·	5.6 km	MPC · JPL
12037	1997 CT_{19}	—	February 11, 1997	Chiyoda	T. Kojima	NYS	3.6 km	MPC · JPL
12038	1997 CE_{20}	—	February 12, 1997	Ōizumi	T. Kobayashi	·	4.8 km	MPC · JPL
12039	1997 CB_{22}	—	February 13, 1997	Ōizumi	T. Kobayashi	·	16 km	MPC · JPL
12040 Jacobi	1997 EK_{8}	Jacobi	March 8, 1997	Prescott	P. G. Comba	·	3.5 km	MPC · JPL
12041	1997 EQ_{25}	—	March 5, 1997	Oohira	T. Urata	CYB	9.5 km	MPC · JPL
12042 Laques	1997 FC	Laques	March 17, 1997	Ramonville	Buil, C.	EOS	10 km	MPC · JPL
12043	1997 FN	—	March 22, 1997	Xinglong	SCAP	·	14 km	MPC · JPL
12044 Fabbri	1997 FU	Fabbri	March 29, 1997	Montelupo	M. Tombelli, G. Forti	EUN	7.3 km	MPC · JPL
12045 Klein	1997 FH_{1}	Klein	March 30, 1997	Prescott	P. G. Comba	EUN	7.4 km	MPC · JPL
12046	1997 FQ_{4}	—	March 31, 1997	Socorro	LINEAR	HYG	14 km	MPC · JPL
12047 Hideomitani	1997 GX_{3}	Hideomitani	April 3, 1997	Kitami	K. Endate, K. Watanabe	·	7.0 km	MPC · JPL
12048	1997 GW_{29}	—	April 2, 1997	Xinglong	SCAP	EOS	6.3 km	MPC · JPL
12049	1997 GT_{32}	—	April 3, 1997	Socorro	LINEAR	KOR	6.7 km	MPC · JPL
12050 Humecronyn	1997 HE_{14}	Humecronyn	April 27, 1997	Kitt Peak	Spacewatch	KOR	6.9 km	MPC · JPL
12051 Pícha	1997 JO	Pícha	May 2, 1997	Ondřejov	L. Kotková	·	6.8 km	MPC · JPL
12052 Aretaon	1997 JB_{16}	Aretaon	May 3, 1997	La Silla	E. W. Elst	L5	39 km	MPC · JPL
12053 Turtlestar	1997 PK_{2}	Turtlestar	August 9, 1997	Starkenburg Observatory	Starkenburg	V	3.5 km	MPC · JPL
12054	1997 TT_{9}	—	October 5, 1997	Ondřejov	L. Kotková	L4	23 km	MPC · JPL
12055	1997 YR_{11}	—	December 30, 1997	Ōizumi	T. Kobayashi	·	3.4 km	MPC · JPL
12056 Yoshigeru	1997 YS_{11}	Yoshigeru	December 30, 1997	Ōizumi	T. Kobayashi	(2076)	3.6 km	MPC · JPL
12057 Alfredsturm	1998 DK_{1}	Alfredsturm	February 18, 1998	Starkenburg Observatory	Starkenburg	·	3.2 km	MPC · JPL
12058	1998 DV_{11}	—	February 24, 1998	Haleakalā	NEAT	·	4.6 km	MPC · JPL
12059 du Châtelet	1998 ED_{14}	du Châtelet	March 1, 1998	La Silla	E. W. Elst	·	4.8 km	MPC · JPL
12060	1998 FH_{2}	—	March 20, 1998	Socorro	LINEAR	·	3.5 km	MPC · JPL
12061 Alena	1998 FQ_{2}	Alena	March 21, 1998	Zeno	T. Stafford	·	4.1 km	MPC · JPL
12062 Tilmanspohn	1998 FB_{10}	Tilmanspohn	March 24, 1998	Caussols	ODAS	·	3.8 km	MPC · JPL
12063	1998 FH_{11}	—	March 22, 1998	Ōizumi	T. Kobayashi	·	3.2 km	MPC · JPL
12064 Guiraudon	1998 FZ_{15}	Guiraudon	March 28, 1998	Caussols	ODAS	HNS	6.6 km	MPC · JPL
12065 Jaworski	1998 FA_{33}	Jaworski	March 20, 1998	Socorro	LINEAR	·	2.0 km	MPC · JPL
12066	1998 FX_{39}	—	March 20, 1998	Socorro	LINEAR	·	3.3 km	MPC · JPL
12067 Jeter	1998 FH_{42}	Jeter	March 20, 1998	Socorro	LINEAR	·	2.4 km	MPC · JPL
12068 Khandrika	1998 FZ_{53}	Khandrika	March 20, 1998	Socorro	LINEAR	·	3.1 km	MPC · JPL
12069 Michaelbruno	1998 FC_{59}	Michaelbruno	March 20, 1998	Socorro	LINEAR	·	5.3 km	MPC · JPL
12070 Kilkis	1998 FK_{63}	Kilkis	March 20, 1998	Socorro	LINEAR	NYS	3.3 km	MPC · JPL
12071 Davykim	1998 FV_{63}	Davykim	March 20, 1998	Socorro	LINEAR	·	4.1 km	MPC · JPL
12072 Anupamakotha	1998 FA_{65}	Anupamakotha	March 20, 1998	Socorro	LINEAR	SUL	7.3 km	MPC · JPL
12073 Larimer	1998 FD_{66}	Larimer	March 20, 1998	Socorro	LINEAR	·	3.0 km	MPC · JPL
12074 Carolinelau	1998 FZ_{68}	Carolinelau	March 20, 1998	Socorro	LINEAR	·	4.8 km	MPC · JPL
12075 Legg	1998 FX_{69}	Legg	March 20, 1998	Socorro	LINEAR	NYS	6.9 km	MPC · JPL
12076	1998 FT_{70}	—	March 20, 1998	Socorro	LINEAR	·	5.4 km	MPC · JPL
12077 Frankthorne	1998 FZ_{70}	Frankthorne	March 20, 1998	Socorro	LINEAR	·	5.6 km	MPC · JPL
12078 Ikezi	1998 FJ_{72}	Ikezi	March 20, 1998	Socorro	LINEAR	·	2.3 km	MPC · JPL
12079 Kaibab	1998 FZ_{73}	Kaibab	March 22, 1998	Anderson Mesa	LONEOS	NYS	3.9 km	MPC · JPL
12080	1998 FC_{111}	—	March 31, 1998	Socorro	LINEAR	EOS	10 km	MPC · JPL
12081	1998 FH_{115}	—	March 31, 1998	Socorro	LINEAR	·	4.5 km	MPC · JPL
12082	1998 FS_{118}	—	March 31, 1998	Socorro	LINEAR	·	8.8 km	MPC · JPL
12083 Darone	1998 FS_{121}	Darone	March 20, 1998	Socorro	LINEAR	·	3.7 km	MPC · JPL
12084 Unno	1998 FL_{125}	Unno	March 22, 1998	Geisei	T. Seki	EUN	5.5 km	MPC · JPL
12085 Susanmoore	1998 HV_{19}	Susanmoore	April 18, 1998	Socorro	LINEAR	·	2.5 km	MPC · JPL
12086 Joshualevine	1998 HC_{22}	Joshualevine	April 20, 1998	Socorro	LINEAR	·	2.1 km	MPC · JPL
12087 Tiffanylin	1998 HB_{30}	Tiffanylin	April 20, 1998	Socorro	LINEAR	·	2.4 km	MPC · JPL
12088 Macalintal	1998 HZ_{31}	Macalintal	April 20, 1998	Socorro	LINEAR	V	3.7 km	MPC · JPL
12089 Maichin	1998 HO_{35}	Maichin	April 20, 1998	Socorro	LINEAR	·	5.6 km	MPC · JPL
12090	1998 HX_{36}	—	April 20, 1998	Socorro	LINEAR	DOR	9.2 km	MPC · JPL
12091 Jesmalmquist	1998 HS_{96}	Jesmalmquist	April 21, 1998	Socorro	LINEAR	V	3.4 km	MPC · JPL
12092 Erinorourke	1998 HH_{97}	Erinorourke	April 21, 1998	Socorro	LINEAR	KON	9.7 km	MPC · JPL
12093 Chrimatthews	1998 HF_{99}	Chrimatthews	April 21, 1998	Socorro	LINEAR	·	2.3 km	MPC · JPL
12094 Mazumder	1998 HX_{99}	Mazumder	April 21, 1998	Socorro	LINEAR	·	3.2 km	MPC · JPL
12095 Pinel	1998 HE_{102}	Pinel	April 25, 1998	La Silla	E. W. Elst	KOR	6.2 km	MPC · JPL
12096	1998 HL_{120}	—	April 23, 1998	Socorro	LINEAR	EUN	6.6 km	MPC · JPL
12097 Peterlowen	1998 HG_{121}	Peterlowen	April 23, 1998	Socorro	LINEAR	·	4.1 km	MPC · JPL
12098	1998 HV_{122}	—	April 23, 1998	Socorro	LINEAR	·	16 km	MPC · JPL
12099 Meigooni	1998 HQ_{124}	Meigooni	April 23, 1998	Socorro	LINEAR	·	3.6 km	MPC · JPL
12100 Amiens	1998 HR_{149}	Amiens	April 25, 1998	La Silla	E. W. Elst	·	2.6 km	MPC · JPL

== 12101–12200 ==
back to top

Designation			Discovery			Properties		Ref
Permanent	Provisional	Named after	Date	Site	Discoverer(s)	Category	Diam.	Ref
12101 Trujillo	1998 JX_{2}	Trujillo	May 1, 1998	Anderson Mesa	LONEOS	EOS	7.0 km	MPC · JPL
12102 Piazzolla	1998 JB_{4}	Piazzolla	May 5, 1998	Woomera	F. B. Zoltowski	EUN	4.9 km	MPC · JPL
12103	1998 KL	—	May 19, 1998	Woomera	F. B. Zoltowski	·	3.2 km	MPC · JPL
12104 Chesley	1998 KO_{6}	Chesley	May 22, 1998	Anderson Mesa	LONEOS	·	11 km	MPC · JPL
12105	1998 KA_{10}	—	May 25, 1998	Xinglong	SCAP	·	3.9 km	MPC · JPL
12106 Menghuan	1998 KQ_{31}	Menghuan	May 22, 1998	Socorro	LINEAR	·	2.0 km	MPC · JPL
12107 Reneebarcia	1998 KU_{46}	Reneebarcia	May 22, 1998	Socorro	LINEAR	·	3.1 km	MPC · JPL
12108 Jamesaustin	1998 KJ_{48}	Jamesaustin	May 22, 1998	Socorro	LINEAR	·	9.7 km	MPC · JPL
12109	1998 KD_{51}	—	May 23, 1998	Socorro	LINEAR	·	10 km	MPC · JPL
12110	1998 KL_{56}	—	May 22, 1998	La Palma	Burleigh, M. R., Bannister, N. P.	·	3.8 km	MPC · JPL
12111 Ulm	1998 LU	Ulm	June 1, 1998	La Silla	E. W. Elst	·	4.2 km	MPC · JPL
12112 Sprague	1998 MK_{4}	Sprague	June 23, 1998	Catalina	CSS	·	14 km	MPC · JPL
12113 Hollows	1998 OH_{12}	Hollows	July 29, 1998	Reedy Creek	J. Broughton	EOS	9.4 km	MPC · JPL
12114	1998 QJ_{8}	—	August 17, 1998	Socorro	LINEAR	·	16 km	MPC · JPL
12115 Robertgrimm	1998 SD_{2}	Robertgrimm	September 16, 1998	Catalina	CSS	·	20 km	MPC · JPL
12116	1999 JA_{34}	—	May 10, 1999	Socorro	LINEAR	·	13 km	MPC · JPL
12117 Meagmessina	1999 JT_{60}	Meagmessina	May 10, 1999	Socorro	LINEAR	·	3.1 km	MPC · JPL
12118 Mirotsin	1999 NC_{9}	Mirotsin	July 13, 1999	Socorro	LINEAR	(2076)	4.2 km	MPC · JPL
12119 Memamis	1999 NG_{9}	Memamis	July 13, 1999	Socorro	LINEAR	·	3.4 km	MPC · JPL
12120 Rebeccagrella	1999 NQ_{41}	Rebeccagrella	July 14, 1999	Socorro	LINEAR	·	2.8 km	MPC · JPL
12121 Greenwald	1999 NX_{48}	Greenwald	July 13, 1999	Socorro	LINEAR	EUN ·	4.7 km	MPC · JPL
12122	1999 NV_{55}	—	July 12, 1999	Socorro	LINEAR	·	7.3 km	MPC · JPL
12123 Pazin	1999 OS	Pazin	July 18, 1999	Višnjan Observatory	Višnjan	NYS ·	5.7 km	MPC · JPL
12124 Hvar	1999 RG_{3}	Hvar	September 6, 1999	Višnjan Observatory	K. Korlević	KOR	5.4 km	MPC · JPL
12125 Jamesjones	1999 RS_{4}	Jamesjones	September 3, 1999	Kitt Peak	Spacewatch	THM · fast	11 km	MPC · JPL
12126 Chersidamas	1999 RM_{11}	Chersidamas	September 7, 1999	Socorro	LINEAR	L5	53 km	MPC · JPL
12127 Mamiya	1999 RD_{37}	Mamiya	September 9, 1999	JCPM Sapporo	K. Watanabe	NYS	11 km	MPC · JPL
12128 Palermiti	1999 RP_{43}	Palermiti	September 13, 1999	Fountain Hills	C. W. Juels	EOS	8.9 km	MPC · JPL
12129	1999 RB_{138}	—	September 9, 1999	Socorro	LINEAR	THM ·	14 km	MPC · JPL
12130 Mousa	1999 RD_{146}	Mousa	September 9, 1999	Socorro	LINEAR	·	3.4 km	MPC · JPL
12131 Echternach	2085 P-L	Echternach	September 24, 1960	Palomar	C. J. van Houten, I. van Houten-Groeneveld, T. Gehrels	KOR	4.1 km	MPC · JPL
12132 Wimfröger	2103 P-L	Wimfröger	September 24, 1960	Palomar	C. J. van Houten, I. van Houten-Groeneveld, T. Gehrels	·	8.1 km	MPC · JPL
12133 Titulaer	2558 P-L	Titulaer	September 24, 1960	Palomar	C. J. van Houten, I. van Houten-Groeneveld, T. Gehrels	HYG	9.7 km	MPC · JPL
12134 Hansfriedeman	2574 P-L	Hansfriedeman	September 24, 1960	Palomar	C. J. van Houten, I. van Houten-Groeneveld, T. Gehrels	·	8.6 km	MPC · JPL
12135 Terlingen	3021 P-L	Terlingen	September 24, 1960	Palomar	C. J. van Houten, I. van Houten-Groeneveld, T. Gehrels	(5651)	13 km	MPC · JPL
12136 Martinryle	3045 P-L	Martinryle	September 24, 1960	Palomar	C. J. van Houten, I. van Houten-Groeneveld, T. Gehrels	EUN	5.6 km	MPC · JPL
12137 Williefowler	4004 P-L	Williefowler	September 24, 1960	Palomar	C. J. van Houten, I. van Houten-Groeneveld, T. Gehrels	·	5.6 km	MPC · JPL
12138 Olinwilson	4053 P-L	Olinwilson	September 24, 1960	Palomar	C. J. van Houten, I. van Houten-Groeneveld, T. Gehrels	·	3.2 km	MPC · JPL
12139 Tomcowling	4055 P-L	Tomcowling	September 24, 1960	Palomar	C. J. van Houten, I. van Houten-Groeneveld, T. Gehrels	·	9.1 km	MPC · JPL
12140 Johnbolton	4087 P-L	Johnbolton	September 24, 1960	Palomar	C. J. van Houten, I. van Houten-Groeneveld, T. Gehrels	·	6.1 km	MPC · JPL
12141 Chushayashi	4112 P-L	Chushayashi	September 24, 1960	Palomar	C. J. van Houten, I. van Houten-Groeneveld, T. Gehrels	·	4.8 km	MPC · JPL
12142 Franklow	4624 P-L	Franklow	September 24, 1960	Palomar	C. J. van Houten, I. van Houten-Groeneveld, T. Gehrels	·	8.8 km	MPC · JPL
12143 Harwit	4631 P-L	Harwit	September 24, 1960	Palomar	C. J. van Houten, I. van Houten-Groeneveld, T. Gehrels	V	3.0 km	MPC · JPL
12144 Einhart	4661 P-L	Einhart	September 24, 1960	Palomar	C. J. van Houten, I. van Houten-Groeneveld, T. Gehrels	KOR	4.3 km	MPC · JPL
12145 Behaim	4730 P-L	Behaim	September 24, 1960	Palomar	C. J. van Houten, I. van Houten-Groeneveld, T. Gehrels	·	3.6 km	MPC · JPL
12146 Ostriker	6035 P-L	Ostriker	September 24, 1960	Palomar	C. J. van Houten, I. van Houten-Groeneveld, T. Gehrels	ADE	8.8 km	MPC · JPL
12147 Bramante	6082 P-L	Bramante	September 24, 1960	Palomar	C. J. van Houten, I. van Houten-Groeneveld, T. Gehrels	·	4.7 km	MPC · JPL
12148 Caravaggio	6636 P-L	Caravaggio	September 24, 1960	Palomar	C. J. van Houten, I. van Houten-Groeneveld, T. Gehrels	·	6.6 km	MPC · JPL
12149 Begas	9099 P-L	Begas	October 17, 1960	Palomar	C. J. van Houten, I. van Houten-Groeneveld, T. Gehrels	·	5.6 km	MPC · JPL
12150 De Ruyter	1051 T-1	De Ruyter	March 25, 1971	Palomar	C. J. van Houten, I. van Houten-Groeneveld, T. Gehrels	EOS	10 km	MPC · JPL
12151 Oranje-Nassau	1220 T-1	Oranje-Nassau	March 25, 1971	Palomar	C. J. van Houten, I. van Houten-Groeneveld, T. Gehrels	NYS	3.0 km	MPC · JPL
12152 Aratus	1287 T-1	Aratus	March 25, 1971	Palomar	C. J. van Houten, I. van Houten-Groeneveld, T. Gehrels	·	2.1 km	MPC · JPL
12153 Conon	3219 T-1	Conon	March 26, 1971	Palomar	C. J. van Houten, I. van Houten-Groeneveld, T. Gehrels	·	2.2 km	MPC · JPL
12154 Callimachus	3329 T-1	Callimachus	March 26, 1971	Palomar	C. J. van Houten, I. van Houten-Groeneveld, T. Gehrels	EOS	6.0 km	MPC · JPL
12155 Hyginus	4193 T-1	Hyginus	March 26, 1971	Palomar	C. J. van Houten, I. van Houten-Groeneveld, T. Gehrels	NYS	4.4 km	MPC · JPL
12156 Ubels	1042 T-2	Ubels	September 29, 1973	Palomar	C. J. van Houten, I. van Houten-Groeneveld, T. Gehrels	·	5.0 km	MPC · JPL
12157 Können	1070 T-2	Können	September 29, 1973	Palomar	C. J. van Houten, I. van Houten-Groeneveld, T. Gehrels	V	2.6 km	MPC · JPL
12158 Tape	1101 T-2	Tape	September 29, 1973	Palomar	C. J. van Houten, I. van Houten-Groeneveld, T. Gehrels	·	7.5 km	MPC · JPL
12159 Bettybiegel	1142 T-2	Bettybiegel	September 29, 1973	Palomar	C. J. van Houten, I. van Houten-Groeneveld, T. Gehrels	NYS	2.9 km	MPC · JPL
12160 Karelwakker	1152 T-2	Karelwakker	September 29, 1973	Palomar	C. J. van Houten, I. van Houten-Groeneveld, T. Gehrels	·	5.2 km	MPC · JPL
12161 Avienius	1158 T-2	Avienius	September 29, 1973	Palomar	C. J. van Houten, I. van Houten-Groeneveld, T. Gehrels	NYS	2.8 km	MPC · JPL
12162 Bilderdijk	2145 T-2	Bilderdijk	September 29, 1973	Palomar	C. J. van Houten, I. van Houten-Groeneveld, T. Gehrels	EUN	4.0 km	MPC · JPL
12163 Manilius	3013 T-2	Manilius	September 30, 1973	Palomar	C. J. van Houten, I. van Houten-Groeneveld, T. Gehrels	·	3.9 km	MPC · JPL
12164 Lowellgreen	3067 T-2	Lowellgreen	September 30, 1973	Palomar	C. J. van Houten, I. van Houten-Groeneveld, T. Gehrels	·	3.1 km	MPC · JPL
12165 Ringleb	3289 T-2	Ringleb	September 30, 1973	Palomar	C. J. van Houten, I. van Houten-Groeneveld, T. Gehrels	EOS	7.9 km	MPC · JPL
12166 Oliverherrmann	3372 T-2	Oliverherrmann	September 25, 1973	Palomar	C. J. van Houten, I. van Houten-Groeneveld, T. Gehrels	·	4.1 km	MPC · JPL
12167 Olivermüller	4306 T-2	Olivermüller	September 29, 1973	Palomar	C. J. van Houten, I. van Houten-Groeneveld, T. Gehrels	·	4.0 km	MPC · JPL
12168 Polko	5141 T-2	Polko	September 25, 1973	Palomar	C. J. van Houten, I. van Houten-Groeneveld, T. Gehrels	EOS	12 km	MPC · JPL
12169 Munsterman	2031 T-3	Munsterman	October 16, 1977	Palomar	C. J. van Houten, I. van Houten-Groeneveld, T. Gehrels	·	1.9 km	MPC · JPL
12170 Vanvollenhoven	2372 T-3	Vanvollenhoven	October 16, 1977	Palomar	C. J. van Houten, I. van Houten-Groeneveld, T. Gehrels	·	7.7 km	MPC · JPL
12171 Johannink	2382 T-3	Johannink	October 16, 1977	Palomar	C. J. van Houten, I. van Houten-Groeneveld, T. Gehrels	·	5.6 km	MPC · JPL
12172 Niekdekort	2390 T-3	Niekdekort	October 16, 1977	Palomar	C. J. van Houten, I. van Houten-Groeneveld, T. Gehrels	·	4.3 km	MPC · JPL
12173 Lansbergen	3135 T-3	Lansbergen	October 16, 1977	Palomar	C. J. van Houten, I. van Houten-Groeneveld, T. Gehrels	AGN	4.2 km	MPC · JPL
12174 van het Reve	3164 T-3	van het Reve	October 16, 1977	Palomar	C. J. van Houten, I. van Houten-Groeneveld, T. Gehrels	·	5.4 km	MPC · JPL
12175 Wimhermans	3197 T-3	Wimhermans	October 16, 1977	Palomar	C. J. van Houten, I. van Houten-Groeneveld, T. Gehrels	THM	12 km	MPC · JPL
12176 Hidayat	3468 T-3	Hidayat	October 16, 1977	Palomar	C. J. van Houten, I. van Houten-Groeneveld, T. Gehrels	MAS	2.4 km	MPC · JPL
12177 Raharto	4074 T-3	Raharto	October 16, 1977	Palomar	C. J. van Houten, I. van Houten-Groeneveld, T. Gehrels	·	2.9 km	MPC · JPL
12178 Dhani	4304 T-3	Dhani	October 16, 1977	Palomar	C. J. van Houten, I. van Houten-Groeneveld, T. Gehrels	·	5.3 km	MPC · JPL
12179 Taufiq	5030 T-3	Taufiq	October 16, 1977	Palomar	C. J. van Houten, I. van Houten-Groeneveld, T. Gehrels	·	5.3 km	MPC · JPL
12180 Kistemaker	5167 T-3	Kistemaker	October 16, 1977	Palomar	C. J. van Houten, I. van Houten-Groeneveld, T. Gehrels	·	8.4 km	MPC · JPL
12181	1964 VL_{1}	—	November 9, 1964	Nanking	Purple Mountain	·	9.3 km	MPC · JPL
12182 Storm	1973 UQ_{5}	Storm	October 27, 1973	Tautenburg Observatory	F. Börngen	·	4.5 km	MPC · JPL
12183 Caltonen	1975 SU_{1}	Caltonen	September 30, 1975	Palomar	S. J. Bus	THM	11 km	MPC · JPL
12184 Trevormerkley	1975 SB_{2}	Trevormerkley	September 30, 1975	Palomar	S. J. Bus	·	2.7 km	MPC · JPL
12185 Gasprinskij	1976 SL_{5}	Gasprinskij	September 24, 1976	Nauchnij	N. S. Chernykh	·	8.7 km	MPC · JPL
12186 Mitukurigen	1977 ER_{5}	Mitukurigen	March 12, 1977	Kiso	H. Kosai, K. Furukawa	KOR	6.1 km	MPC · JPL
12187 Lenagoryunova	1977 RL_{7}	Lenagoryunova	September 11, 1977	Nauchnij	N. S. Chernykh	·	5.8 km	MPC · JPL
12188 Kalaallitnunaat	1978 PE	Kalaallitnunaat	August 9, 1978	La Silla	R. M. West	·	3.2 km	MPC · JPL
12189 Dovgyj	1978 RQ_{1}	Dovgyj	September 5, 1978	Nauchnij	N. S. Chernykh	·	3.3 km	MPC · JPL
12190 Sarkisov	1978 SE_{5}	Sarkisov	September 27, 1978	Nauchnij	L. I. Chernykh	·	6.0 km	MPC · JPL
12191 Vorontsova	1978 TT_{8}	Vorontsova	October 9, 1978	Nauchnij	L. V. Zhuravleva	(5)	4.9 km	MPC · JPL
12192 Gregbollendonk	1978 VD_{5}	Gregbollendonk	November 7, 1978	Palomar	E. F. Helin, S. J. Bus	THM	7.4 km	MPC · JPL
12193	1979 EL	—	March 4, 1979	Anderson Mesa	N. G. Thomas	EUN	9.4 km	MPC · JPL
12194	1979 KO_{1}	—	May 24, 1979	Bickley	Perth Observatory	·	5.0 km	MPC · JPL
12195 Johndavidniemann	1979 MM_{4}	Johndavidniemann	June 25, 1979	Siding Spring	E. F. Helin, S. J. Bus	·	3.6 km	MPC · JPL
12196 Weems	1979 MM_{8}	Weems	June 25, 1979	Siding Spring	E. F. Helin, S. J. Bus	·	3.5 km	MPC · JPL
12197 Jan-Otto	1980 FR_{2}	Jan-Otto	March 16, 1980	La Silla	C.-I. Lagerkvist	(5)	4.6 km	MPC · JPL
12198	1980 PJ_{1}	—	August 6, 1980	La Silla	R. M. West	·	2.8 km	MPC · JPL
12199 Sohlman	1980 TK_{6}	Sohlman	October 8, 1980	Nauchnij	L. V. Zhuravleva	·	4.7 km	MPC · JPL
12200 Richlipe	1981 EM_{7}	Richlipe	March 1, 1981	Siding Spring	S. J. Bus	·	5.2 km	MPC · JPL

== 12201–12300 ==
back to top

Designation			Discovery			Properties		Ref
Permanent	Provisional	Named after	Date	Site	Discoverer(s)	Category	Diam.	Ref
12201 Spink	1981 ED_{12}	Spink	March 1, 1981	Siding Spring	S. J. Bus	·	2.9 km	MPC · JPL
12202 Toddgregory	1981 EM_{13}	Toddgregory	March 1, 1981	Siding Spring	S. J. Bus	·	1.9 km	MPC · JPL
12203 Gehling	1981 EO_{19}	Gehling	March 2, 1981	Siding Spring	S. J. Bus	TEL	3.9 km	MPC · JPL
12204 Jonpineau	1981 EK_{26}	Jonpineau	March 2, 1981	Siding Spring	S. J. Bus	·	2.6 km	MPC · JPL
12205 Basharp	1981 EZ_{26}	Basharp	March 2, 1981	Siding Spring	S. J. Bus	fast?	3.0 km	MPC · JPL
12206 Prats	1981 EG_{27}	Prats	March 2, 1981	Siding Spring	S. J. Bus	·	4.0 km	MPC · JPL
12207 Matthewbeasley	1981 EU_{28}	Matthewbeasley	March 1, 1981	Siding Spring	S. J. Bus	·	3.7 km	MPC · JPL
12208 Jacobenglander	1981 EF_{35}	Jacobenglander	March 2, 1981	Siding Spring	S. J. Bus	·	2.6 km	MPC · JPL
12209 Jennalynn	1981 EF_{37}	Jennalynn	March 11, 1981	Siding Spring	S. J. Bus	MAR	6.7 km	MPC · JPL
12210 Prykull	1981 EA_{42}	Prykull	March 2, 1981	Siding Spring	S. J. Bus	·	2.0 km	MPC · JPL
12211 Arnoschmidt	1981 KJ	Arnoschmidt	May 28, 1981	La Silla	H.-E. Schuster	·	16 km	MPC · JPL
12212	1981 QR_{2}	—	August 23, 1981	La Silla	H. Debehogne	·	4.0 km	MPC · JPL
12213	1981 QN_{3}	—	August 26, 1981	La Silla	H. Debehogne	·	9.2 km	MPC · JPL
12214 Miroshnikov	1981 RF_{2}	Miroshnikov	September 7, 1981	Nauchnij	L. G. Karachkina	·	22 km	MPC · JPL
12215 Jessicalounsbury	1981 US_{22}	Jessicalounsbury	October 24, 1981	Palomar	S. J. Bus	·	3.1 km	MPC · JPL
12216	1981 WF_{9}	—	November 16, 1981	Bickley	Perth Observatory	V	2.5 km	MPC · JPL
12217	1982 JD_{2}	—	May 15, 1982	Palomar	Palomar	·	2.5 km	MPC · JPL
12218 Fleischer	1982 RK	Fleischer	September 15, 1982	Anderson Mesa	E. Bowell	moon	5.0 km	MPC · JPL
12219 Grigorʹev	1982 SC_{8}	Grigorʹev	September 19, 1982	Nauchnij	L. I. Chernykh	·	3.1 km	MPC · JPL
12220 Semenchur	1982 UD_{6}	Semenchur	October 20, 1982	Nauchnij	L. G. Karachkina	·	3.0 km	MPC · JPL
12221 Ogatakoan	1982 VS_{2}	Ogatakoan	November 14, 1982	Kiso	H. Kosai, K. Furukawa	·	7.3 km	MPC · JPL
12222 Perotto	1982 WA	Perotto	November 19, 1982	Bologna	San Vittore	·	8.7 km	MPC · JPL
12223 Hoskin	1983 TX	Hoskin	October 8, 1983	Harvard Observatory	Oak Ridge Observatory	EOS	7.5 km	MPC · JPL
12224 Jimcornell	1984 UN_{2}	Jimcornell	October 19, 1984	Harvard Observatory	Oak Ridge Observatory	KOR	6.3 km	MPC · JPL
12225 Yanfernández	1985 PQ	Yanfernández	August 14, 1985	Anderson Mesa	E. Bowell	·	4.1 km	MPC · JPL
12226 Caseylisse	1985 TN	Caseylisse	October 15, 1985	Anderson Mesa	E. Bowell	·	3.1 km	MPC · JPL
12227 Penney	1985 TO_{3}	Penney	October 11, 1985	Palomar	C. S. Shoemaker, E. M. Shoemaker	·	2.1 km	MPC · JPL
12228	1985 TZ_{3}	—	October 11, 1985	Palomar	Gaiser, S. L., Leech, J. P.	(2076)	4.3 km	MPC · JPL
12229 Paulsson	1985 UK_{3}	Paulsson	October 17, 1985	Kvistaberg	C.-I. Lagerkvist	·	4.2 km	MPC · JPL
12230	1986 QN	—	August 25, 1986	La Silla	H. Debehogne	(5)	6.0 km	MPC · JPL
12231	1986 QQ_{1}	—	August 27, 1986	La Silla	H. Debehogne	·	7.9 km	MPC · JPL
12232	1986 QZ_{2}	—	August 28, 1986	La Silla	H. Debehogne	·	5.9 km	MPC · JPL
12233	1986 QF_{3}	—	August 29, 1986	La Silla	H. Debehogne	(5)	3.1 km	MPC · JPL
12234 Shkuratov	1986 RP_{2}	Shkuratov	September 6, 1986	Anderson Mesa	E. Bowell	ADE	11 km	MPC · JPL
12235 Imranakperov	1986 RB_{12}	Imranakperov	September 9, 1986	Nauchnij	L. G. Karachkina	URS	25 km	MPC · JPL
12236	1987 DD_{6}	—	February 22, 1987	La Silla	H. Debehogne	·	3.3 km	MPC · JPL
12237 Coughlin	1987 HE	Coughlin	April 23, 1987	Palomar	C. S. Shoemaker, E. M. Shoemaker	PHO	4.8 km	MPC · JPL
12238 Actor	1987 YU_{1}	Actor	December 17, 1987	La Silla	E. W. Elst, G. Pizarro	L4	30 km	MPC · JPL
12239 Carolinakou	1988 CN_{4}	Carolinakou	February 13, 1988	La Silla	E. W. Elst	·	4.1 km	MPC · JPL
12240 Droste-Hülshoff	1988 PG_{2}	Droste-Hülshoff	August 13, 1988	Tautenburg Observatory	F. Börngen	NYS	3.2 km	MPC · JPL
12241 Lefort	1988 PQ_{2}	Lefort	August 13, 1988	Tautenburg Observatory	F. Börngen	·	2.9 km	MPC · JPL
12242 Koon	1988 QY	Koon	August 18, 1988	Palomar	C. S. Shoemaker, E. M. Shoemaker	L5	38 km	MPC · JPL
12243	1988 RD_{1}	—	September 9, 1988	Brorfelde	P. Jensen	EOS	9.9 km	MPC · JPL
12244 Werfel	1988 RY_{2}	Werfel	September 8, 1988	Tautenburg Observatory	F. Börngen	EOS	8.2 km	MPC · JPL
12245	1988 RM_{7}	—	September 9, 1988	La Silla	H. Debehogne	·	6.3 km	MPC · JPL
12246 Pliska	1988 RJ_{8}	Pliska	September 11, 1988	Smolyan	V. G. Ivanova	·	5.2 km	MPC · JPL
12247 Michaelsekerak	1988 RO_{11}	Michaelsekerak	September 14, 1988	Cerro Tololo	S. J. Bus	·	7.3 km	MPC · JPL
12248 Russellcarpenter	1988 RX_{12}	Russellcarpenter	September 14, 1988	Cerro Tololo	S. J. Bus	EOS	8.6 km	MPC · JPL
12249 Hannorein	1988 SH_{2}	Hannorein	September 16, 1988	Cerro Tololo	S. J. Bus	EOS	9.4 km	MPC · JPL
12250	1988 TT	—	October 13, 1988	Kushiro	S. Ueda, H. Kaneda	EOS	7.6 km	MPC · JPL
12251	1988 TO_{1}	—	October 9, 1988	Gekko	Y. Oshima	·	6.2 km	MPC · JPL
12252 Gwangju	1988 VT_{1}	Gwangju	November 8, 1988	Ayashi Station	M. Koishikawa	·	7.5 km	MPC · JPL
12253	1988 VG_{4}	—	November 3, 1988	Brorfelde	P. Jensen	·	16 km	MPC · JPL
12254	1988 XJ_{1}	—	December 7, 1988	Okutama	Hioki, T., N. Kawasato	·	19 km	MPC · JPL
12255	1988 XR_{1}	—	December 7, 1988	Yorii	M. Arai, H. Mori	V	3.5 km	MPC · JPL
12256	1989 CJ_{8}	—	February 8, 1989	La Silla	H. Debehogne	·	3.9 km	MPC · JPL
12257 Lassine	1989 GL_{4}	Lassine	April 3, 1989	La Silla	E. W. Elst	EUN	4.1 km	MPC · JPL
12258 Oscarwilde	1989 GN_{4}	Oscarwilde	April 3, 1989	La Silla	E. W. Elst	·	3.6 km	MPC · JPL
12259 Szukalski	1989 SZ_{1}	Szukalski	September 26, 1989	La Silla	E. W. Elst	·	4.0 km	MPC · JPL
12260	1989 SP_{11}	—	September 30, 1989	La Silla	H. Debehogne	KOR	6.5 km	MPC · JPL
12261 Ledouanier	1989 TY_{4}	Ledouanier	October 7, 1989	La Silla	E. W. Elst	·	2.3 km	MPC · JPL
12262 Nishio	1989 UL	Nishio	October 21, 1989	Kitami	K. Endate, K. Watanabe	·	4.6 km	MPC · JPL
12263	1989 YA_{4}	—	December 30, 1989	Siding Spring	R. H. McNaught	·	3.5 km	MPC · JPL
12264	1990 CD	—	February 1, 1990	Dynic	A. Sugie	·	4.0 km	MPC · JPL
12265	1990 FG	—	March 23, 1990	Palomar	E. F. Helin	H	3.6 km	MPC · JPL
12266	1990 FL	—	March 23, 1990	Palomar	E. F. Helin	PHO	3.9 km	MPC · JPL
12267 Denneau	1990 KN_{1}	Denneau	May 31, 1990	Kitt Peak	Spacewatch	H	1.4 km	MPC · JPL
12268	1990 OY_{1}	—	July 29, 1990	Palomar	H. E. Holt	·	6.6 km	MPC · JPL
12269	1990 QR	—	August 19, 1990	Palomar	E. F. Helin	EUN	9.8 km	MPC · JPL
12270 Bozar	1990 QR_{9}	Bozar	August 16, 1990	La Silla	E. W. Elst	·	7.1 km	MPC · JPL
12271	1990 RC_{2}	—	September 14, 1990	Palomar	H. E. Holt	·	5.4 km	MPC · JPL
12272 Geddylee	1990 SZ_{3}	Geddylee	September 22, 1990	Palomar	B. Roman	EUN	6.5 km	MPC · JPL
12273	1990 TS_{4}	—	October 9, 1990	Siding Spring	R. H. McNaught	·	11 km	MPC · JPL
12274	1990 UJ_{1}	—	October 19, 1990	Okutama	Hioki, T., Hayakawa, S.	EUN	5.7 km	MPC · JPL
12275 Marcelgoffin	1990 VS_{5}	Marcelgoffin	November 15, 1990	La Silla	E. W. Elst	GEF	7.6 km	MPC · JPL
12276 IJzer	1990 WW_{1}	IJzer	November 18, 1990	La Silla	E. W. Elst	·	5.9 km	MPC · JPL
12277 Tajimasatonokai	1990 WN_{2}	Tajimasatonokai	November 17, 1990	Geisei	T. Seki	EUN	5.9 km	MPC · JPL
12278 Kisohinoki	1990 WQ_{2}	Kisohinoki	November 21, 1990	Kitami	K. Endate, K. Watanabe	·	5.4 km	MPC · JPL
12279 Laon	1990 WP_{4}	Laon	November 16, 1990	La Silla	E. W. Elst	GEF	7.9 km	MPC · JPL
12280 Reims	1990 WS_{4}	Reims	November 16, 1990	La Silla	E. W. Elst	·	4.8 km	MPC · JPL
12281 Chaumont	1990 WA_{5}	Chaumont	November 16, 1990	La Silla	E. W. Elst	PAD	16 km	MPC · JPL
12282 Crombecq	1991 BV_{1}	Crombecq	January 21, 1991	Haute-Provence	E. W. Elst	·	6.6 km	MPC · JPL
12283	1991 EC	—	March 9, 1991	Dynic	A. Sugie	·	14 km	MPC · JPL
12284 Pohl	1991 FP	Pohl	March 17, 1991	Palomar	E. F. Helin	THB	11 km	MPC · JPL
12285	1991 FN_{2}	—	March 20, 1991	La Silla	H. Debehogne	·	6.8 km	MPC · JPL
12286 Poiseuille	1991 GY_{4}	Poiseuille	April 8, 1991	La Silla	E. W. Elst	·	2.6 km	MPC · JPL
12287 Langres	1991 GH_{5}	Langres	April 8, 1991	La Silla	E. W. Elst	HYG	8.0 km	MPC · JPL
12288 Verdun	1991 GC_{6}	Verdun	April 8, 1991	La Silla	E. W. Elst	·	3.4 km	MPC · JPL
12289 Carnot	1991 GP_{7}	Carnot	April 8, 1991	La Silla	E. W. Elst	·	3.6 km	MPC · JPL
12290	1991 LZ	—	June 14, 1991	Palomar	E. F. Helin	·	3.6 km	MPC · JPL
12291 Gohnaumann	1991 LJ_{2}	Gohnaumann	June 6, 1991	La Silla	E. W. Elst	·	13 km	MPC · JPL
12292 Dalton	1991 LK_{2}	Dalton	June 6, 1991	La Silla	E. W. Elst	HYG	10 km	MPC · JPL
12293	1991 NV_{1}	—	July 13, 1991	Palomar	H. E. Holt	V	3.8 km	MPC · JPL
12294 Avogadro	1991 PQ_{2}	Avogadro	August 2, 1991	La Silla	E. W. Elst	·	4.3 km	MPC · JPL
12295 Tasso	1991 PE_{3}	Tasso	August 2, 1991	La Silla	E. W. Elst	NYS	4.2 km	MPC · JPL
12296	1991 PL_{13}	—	August 5, 1991	Palomar	H. E. Holt	NYS	3.4 km	MPC · JPL
12297	1991 PT_{14}	—	August 6, 1991	Palomar	H. E. Holt	·	5.2 km	MPC · JPL
12298 Brecht	1991 PL_{17}	Brecht	August 6, 1991	Tautenburg Observatory	F. Börngen	·	6.6 km	MPC · JPL
12299	1991 PV_{17}	—	August 7, 1991	Palomar	H. E. Holt	·	3.3 km	MPC · JPL
12300	1991 RX_{10}	—	September 10, 1991	Palomar	H. E. Holt	PHO	4.1 km	MPC · JPL

== 12301–12400 ==
back to top

Designation			Discovery			Properties		Ref
Permanent	Provisional	Named after	Date	Site	Discoverer(s)	Category	Diam.	Ref
12301 Eötvös	1991 RR_{12}	Eötvös	September 4, 1991	La Silla	E. W. Elst	·	3.8 km	MPC · JPL
12302	1991 RV_{17}	—	September 13, 1991	Palomar	H. E. Holt	·	3.0 km	MPC · JPL
12303	1991 RB_{24}	—	September 11, 1991	Palomar	H. E. Holt	·	2.9 km	MPC · JPL
12304	1991 SR_{1}	—	September 19, 1991	Kiyosato	S. Otomo	EUN	6.6 km	MPC · JPL
12305	1991 TE_{1}	—	October 12, 1991	Siding Spring	R. H. McNaught	EUN	4.5 km	MPC · JPL
12306 Pebronstein	1991 TM_{14}	Pebronstein	October 7, 1991	Palomar	C. P. de Saint-Aignan	NYS	9.0 km	MPC · JPL
12307	1991 UA	—	October 18, 1991	Kushiro	S. Ueda, H. Kaneda	3:2 · SHU	20 km	MPC · JPL
12308	1991 VB_{5}	—	November 4, 1991	Dynic	A. Sugie	MAR	6.1 km	MPC · JPL
12309 Tommygrav	1992 DD_{3}	Tommygrav	February 25, 1992	Kitt Peak	Spacewatch	·	8.7 km	MPC · JPL
12310 Londontario	1992 DE_{4}	Londontario	February 29, 1992	Kitt Peak	Spacewatch	·	8.4 km	MPC · JPL
12311 Ingemyr	1992 EO_{6}	Ingemyr	March 1, 1992	La Silla	UESAC	·	5.4 km	MPC · JPL
12312 Väte	1992 EM_{8}	Väte	March 2, 1992	La Silla	UESAC	·	7.4 km	MPC · JPL
12313	1992 EX_{10}	—	March 6, 1992	La Silla	UESAC	·	3.4 km	MPC · JPL
12314	1992 EE_{14}	—	March 2, 1992	La Silla	UESAC	AGN	4.0 km	MPC · JPL
12315	1992 FA_{2}	—	March 28, 1992	Kushiro	S. Ueda, H. Kaneda	PAD	15 km	MPC · JPL
12316	1992 HG	—	April 27, 1992	Kiyosato	S. Otomo	·	17 km	MPC · JPL
12317 Madicampbell	1992 HH_{1}	Madicampbell	April 24, 1992	Kitt Peak	Spacewatch	HOF	13 km	MPC · JPL
12318 Kästner	1992 HD_{7}	Kästner	April 30, 1992	Tautenburg Observatory	F. Börngen	·	7.9 km	MPC · JPL
12319	1992 PC	—	August 2, 1992	Harvard Observatory	Oak Ridge Observatory	·	2.3 km	MPC · JPL
12320 Loschmidt	1992 PH_{1}	Loschmidt	August 8, 1992	Caussols	E. W. Elst	·	2.1 km	MPC · JPL
12321 Zurakowski	1992 PZ_{1}	Zurakowski	August 4, 1992	Palomar	H. E. Holt	·	2.5 km	MPC · JPL
12322	1992 QW	—	August 31, 1992	Palomar	E. F. Helin	·	2.2 km	MPC · JPL
12323 Haeckel	1992 RX	Haeckel	September 4, 1992	Tautenburg Observatory	F. Börngen, L. D. Schmadel	·	3.1 km	MPC · JPL
12324 Van Rompaey	1992 RS_{3}	Van Rompaey	September 2, 1992	La Silla	E. W. Elst	·	2.6 km	MPC · JPL
12325 Bogota	1992 RH_{7}	Bogota	September 2, 1992	La Silla	E. W. Elst	·	3.3 km	MPC · JPL
12326 Shirasaki	1992 SF	Shirasaki	September 21, 1992	Kitami	K. Endate, K. Watanabe	moon	3.1 km	MPC · JPL
12327 Terbrüggen	1992 SX_{1}	Terbrüggen	September 21, 1992	Tautenburg Observatory	L. D. Schmadel, F. Börngen	·	6.0 km	MPC · JPL
12328	1992 SK_{13}	—	September 26, 1992	Dynic	A. Sugie	(2076)	3.8 km	MPC · JPL
12329 Liebermann	1992 SR_{23}	Liebermann	September 23, 1992	Tautenburg Observatory	F. Börngen	·	3.3 km	MPC · JPL
12330	1992 UX_{2}	—	October 25, 1992	Uenohara	N. Kawasato	·	4.2 km	MPC · JPL
12331	1992 UH_{6}	—	October 31, 1992	Uenohara	N. Kawasato	·	4.1 km	MPC · JPL
12332	1992 UJ_{6}	—	October 31, 1992	Uenohara	N. Kawasato	·	3.6 km	MPC · JPL
12333	1992 WJ_{2}	—	November 18, 1992	Kushiro	S. Ueda, H. Kaneda	V	3.4 km	MPC · JPL
12334	1992 WD_{3}	—	November 18, 1992	Dynic	A. Sugie	(2076)	5.0 km	MPC · JPL
12335 Tatsukushi	1992 WJ_{3}	Tatsukushi	November 21, 1992	Geisei	T. Seki	·	4.5 km	MPC · JPL
12336	1992 WO_{3}	—	November 23, 1992	Oohira	T. Urata	PHO	6.1 km	MPC · JPL
12337	1992 WV_{3}	—	November 24, 1992	Yatsugatake	Y. Kushida, O. Muramatsu	·	5.4 km	MPC · JPL
12338	1992 XE	—	December 14, 1992	Kiyosato	S. Otomo	(883)	3.9 km	MPC · JPL
12339 Carloo	1992 YW_{1}	Carloo	December 18, 1992	Caussols	E. W. Elst	·	3.8 km	MPC · JPL
12340 Stalle	1992 YJ_{2}	Stalle	December 18, 1992	Caussols	E. W. Elst	V	4.6 km	MPC · JPL
12341 Calevoet	1993 BN_{4}	Calevoet	January 27, 1993	Caussols	E. W. Elst	NYS	4.3 km	MPC · JPL
12342 Kudohmichiko	1993 BL_{12}	Kudohmichiko	January 30, 1993	Yatsugatake	Y. Kushida, O. Muramatsu	·	7.0 km	MPC · JPL
12343 Martinbeech	1993 DT_{1}	Martinbeech	February 26, 1993	Kitt Peak	Spacewatch	·	5.5 km	MPC · JPL
12344 Maryland	1993 FB_{1}	Maryland	March 18, 1993	Hidaka	Shirai, S., Hayakawa, S.	RAF	4.6 km	MPC · JPL
12345	1993 FT_{8}	—	March 17, 1993	La Silla	UESAC	·	3.0 km	MPC · JPL
12346	1993 FK_{25}	—	March 21, 1993	La Silla	UESAC	·	5.2 km	MPC · JPL
12347	1993 FW_{37}	—	March 19, 1993	La Silla	UESAC	·	3.7 km	MPC · JPL
12348	1993 FX_{40}	—	March 19, 1993	La Silla	UESAC	·	4.1 km	MPC · JPL
12349 Akebonozou	1993 GO	Akebonozou	April 14, 1993	Dynic	A. Sugie	·	11 km	MPC · JPL
12350 Feuchtwanger	1993 HA_{6}	Feuchtwanger	April 23, 1993	Tautenburg Observatory	F. Börngen	·	5.6 km	MPC · JPL
12351	1993 JD	—	May 14, 1993	Kiyosato	S. Otomo	EUN	5.5 km	MPC · JPL
12352 Jepejacobsen	1993 OX_{6}	Jepejacobsen	July 20, 1993	La Silla	E. W. Elst	·	16 km	MPC · JPL
12353 Márquez	1993 OR_{9}	Márquez	July 20, 1993	La Silla	E. W. Elst	KOR	5.7 km	MPC · JPL
12354 Hemmerechts	1993 QD_{3}	Hemmerechts	August 18, 1993	Caussols	E. W. Elst	EOS	8.0 km	MPC · JPL
12355 Coelho	1993 QU_{3}	Coelho	August 18, 1993	Caussols	E. W. Elst	KOR	6.0 km	MPC · JPL
12356 Carlscheele	1993 RM_{14}	Carlscheele	September 15, 1993	La Silla	E. W. Elst	KOR	6.0 km	MPC · JPL
12357 Toyako	1993 ST_{1}	Toyako	September 16, 1993	Kitami	K. Endate, K. Watanabe	EOS	15 km	MPC · JPL
12358 Azzurra	1993 SO_{2}	Azzurra	September 22, 1993	Stroncone	A. Vagnozzi	·	12 km	MPC · JPL
12359 Cajigal	1993 SN_{3}	Cajigal	September 22, 1993	Mérida	Naranjo, O. A.	THM	13 km	MPC · JPL
12360 Unilandes	1993 SQ_{3}	Unilandes	September 22, 1993	Mérida	Naranjo, O. A.	THM	10 km	MPC · JPL
12361	1993 TB	—	October 9, 1993	Uenohara	N. Kawasato	THM	7.6 km	MPC · JPL
12362 Mumuryk	1993 TS_{1}	Mumuryk	October 15, 1993	Kitami	K. Endate, K. Watanabe	·	13 km	MPC · JPL
12363 Marinmarais	1993 TA_{24}	Marinmarais	October 9, 1993	La Silla	E. W. Elst	THM	10 km	MPC · JPL
12364 Asadagouryu	1993 XQ_{1}	Asadagouryu	December 15, 1993	Ōizumi	T. Kobayashi	·	2.8 km	MPC · JPL
12365 Yoshitoki	1993 YD	Yoshitoki	December 17, 1993	Ōizumi	T. Kobayashi	·	28 km	MPC · JPL
12366 Luisapla	1994 CD_{8}	Luisapla	February 8, 1994	Mérida	Naranjo, O. A.	·	3.9 km	MPC · JPL
12367 Ourinhos	1994 CN_{8}	Ourinhos	February 8, 1994	Mérida	Naranjo, O. A.	·	3.2 km	MPC · JPL
12368 Mutsaers	1994 CM_{11}	Mutsaers	February 7, 1994	La Silla	E. W. Elst	·	3.7 km	MPC · JPL
12369 Pirandello	1994 CJ_{16}	Pirandello	February 8, 1994	La Silla	E. W. Elst	(1338) (FLO)	4.0 km	MPC · JPL
12370 Kageyasu	1994 GB_{9}	Kageyasu	April 11, 1994	Kushiro	S. Ueda, H. Kaneda	·	3.7 km	MPC · JPL
12371	1994 GL_{9}	—	April 14, 1994	Kiyosato	S. Otomo	·	3.4 km	MPC · JPL
12372 Kagesuke	1994 JF	Kagesuke	May 6, 1994	Ōizumi	T. Kobayashi	·	2.9 km	MPC · JPL
12373 Lancearmstrong	1994 JE_{9}	Lancearmstrong	May 15, 1994	Palomar	C. P. de Saint-Aignan	·	3.3 km	MPC · JPL
12374 Rakhat	1994 JG_{9}	Rakhat	May 15, 1994	Palomar	C. P. de Saint-Aignan	·	4.6 km	MPC · JPL
12375	1994 NO_{1}	—	July 8, 1994	Caussols	E. W. Elst	·	4.0 km	MPC · JPL
12376 Cochabamba	1994 NW_{1}	Cochabamba	July 8, 1994	Caussols	E. W. Elst	·	5.3 km	MPC · JPL
12377	1994 PP	—	August 11, 1994	Palomar	E. F. Helin	PAL	11 km	MPC · JPL
12378 Johnston	1994 PK_{1}	Johnston	August 15, 1994	Siding Spring	R. H. McNaught	·	6.7 km	MPC · JPL
12379 Thulin	1994 PQ_{11}	Thulin	August 10, 1994	La Silla	E. W. Elst	·	6.0 km	MPC · JPL
12380 Sciascia	1994 PB_{14}	Sciascia	August 10, 1994	La Silla	E. W. Elst	NEM	10 km	MPC · JPL
12381 Hugoclaus	1994 PH_{30}	Hugoclaus	August 12, 1994	La Silla	E. W. Elst	GEF	5.3 km	MPC · JPL
12382 Niagara Falls	1994 SO_{5}	Niagara Falls	September 28, 1994	Kitt Peak	Spacewatch	AST	6.5 km	MPC · JPL
12383 Eboshi	1994 TF_{1}	Eboshi	October 2, 1994	Kitami	K. Endate, K. Watanabe	·	11 km	MPC · JPL
12384 Luigimartella	1994 TC_{2}	Luigimartella	October 10, 1994	Colleverde	V. S. Casulli	EOS	9.4 km	MPC · JPL
12385	1994 UO	—	October 31, 1994	Ōizumi	T. Kobayashi	KOR	5.6 km	MPC · JPL
12386 Nikolova	1994 UK_{5}	Nikolova	October 28, 1994	Kitt Peak	Spacewatch	·	7.1 km	MPC · JPL
12387 Tomokofujiwara	1994 UT_{11}	Tomokofujiwara	October 28, 1994	Kitami	K. Endate, K. Watanabe	·	11 km	MPC · JPL
12388 Kikunokai	1994 VT_{6}	Kikunokai	November 1, 1994	Kitami	K. Endate, K. Watanabe	KOR	5.6 km	MPC · JPL
12389	1994 WU	—	November 25, 1994	Ōizumi	T. Kobayashi	·	20 km	MPC · JPL
12390	1994 WB_{1}	—	November 27, 1994	Ōizumi	T. Kobayashi	H	2.2 km	MPC · JPL
12391 Ecoadachi	1994 WE_{2}	Ecoadachi	November 26, 1994	Kitami	K. Endate, K. Watanabe	·	8.6 km	MPC · JPL
12392	1994 WR_{2}	—	November 30, 1994	Ōizumi	T. Kobayashi	DOR	8.2 km	MPC · JPL
12393	1994 YC_{1}	—	December 28, 1994	Ōizumi	T. Kobayashi	THM	9.4 km	MPC · JPL
12394	1995 BQ	—	January 23, 1995	Ōizumi	T. Kobayashi	·	9.2 km	MPC · JPL
12395 Richnelson	1995 CD_{2}	Richnelson	February 8, 1995	Siding Spring	D. J. Asher	·	16 km	MPC · JPL
12396 Amyphillips	1995 DL_{1}	Amyphillips	February 24, 1995	Catalina Station	C. W. Hergenrother	·	14 km	MPC · JPL
12397 Peterbrown	1995 FV_{14}	Peterbrown	March 27, 1995	Kitt Peak	Spacewatch	·	20 km	MPC · JPL
12398 Pickhardt	1995 KJ_{3}	Pickhardt	May 25, 1995	Kitt Peak	Spacewatch	·	2.1 km	MPC · JPL
12399 Bartolini	1995 OD	Bartolini	July 19, 1995	San Marcello	A. Boattini, L. Tesi	·	2.6 km	MPC · JPL
12400 Katumaru	1995 OA_{1}	Katumaru	July 28, 1995	Nanyo	T. Okuni	·	4.9 km	MPC · JPL

== 12401–12500 ==
back to top

Designation			Discovery			Properties		Ref
Permanent	Provisional	Named after	Date	Site	Discoverer(s)	Category	Diam.	Ref
12401 Tucholsky	1995 OG_{10}	Tucholsky	July 21, 1995	Tautenburg Observatory	F. Börngen	MAS	2.7 km	MPC · JPL
12402	1995 PK	—	August 3, 1995	Kiyosato	S. Otomo	·	4.0 km	MPC · JPL
12403	1995 QD_{3}	—	August 31, 1995	Ōizumi	T. Kobayashi	·	4.2 km	MPC · JPL
12404	1995 QW_{3}	—	August 31, 1995	Catalina Station	T. B. Spahr	PHO	3.0 km	MPC · JPL
12405 Nespoli	1995 RK	Nespoli	September 15, 1995	Sormano	F. Manca, Giuliani, V.	·	2.4 km	MPC · JPL
12406 Zvíkov	1995 SZ_{1}	Zvíkov	September 25, 1995	Kleť	M. Tichý, Z. Moravec	·	3.7 km	MPC · JPL
12407 Riccardi	1995 SC_{2}	Riccardi	September 23, 1995	Bologna	San Vittore	V	3.5 km	MPC · JPL
12408 Fujioka	1995 SP_{2}	Fujioka	September 20, 1995	Kuma Kogen	A. Nakamura	·	2.3 km	MPC · JPL
12409 Bukovanská	1995 SL_{3}	Bukovanská	September 28, 1995	Kleť	Kleť	MAS	1.6 km	MPC · JPL
12410 Donald Duck	1995 SM_{3}	Donald Duck	September 26, 1995	Sormano	P. Sicoli, Ghezzi, P.	·	5.3 km	MPC · JPL
12411 Tannokayo	1995 SQ_{3}	Tannokayo	September 20, 1995	Kitami	K. Endate, K. Watanabe	·	6.2 km	MPC · JPL
12412 Muchisachie	1995 ST_{4}	Muchisachie	September 20, 1995	Kitami	K. Endate, K. Watanabe	·	4.7 km	MPC · JPL
12413 Johnnyweir	1995 SQ_{29}	Johnnyweir	September 26, 1995	Zelenchukskaya	T. V. Krjačko	·	5.7 km	MPC · JPL
12414 Bure	1995 SR_{29}	Bure	September 26, 1995	Zelenchukskaya	T. V. Krjačko	MAS	3.1 km	MPC · JPL
12415 Wakatatakayo	1995 SW_{52}	Wakatatakayo	September 22, 1995	Kitami	K. Endate, K. Watanabe	·	4.3 km	MPC · JPL
12416	1995 TS	—	October 2, 1995	Ōizumi	T. Kobayashi	·	6.2 km	MPC · JPL
12417	1995 TC_{8}	—	October 2, 1995	Kiyosato	S. Otomo	·	3.8 km	MPC · JPL
12418 Tongling	1995 UX_{2}	Tongling	October 23, 1995	Xinglong	SCAP	·	6.6 km	MPC · JPL
12419	1995 UP_{4}	—	October 25, 1995	Ōizumi	T. Kobayashi	·	3.6 km	MPC · JPL
12420	1995 UT_{4}	—	October 25, 1995	Ōizumi	T. Kobayashi	EUN	5.8 km	MPC · JPL
12421 Zhenya	1995 UH_{5}	Zhenya	October 16, 1995	Zelenchukskaya	T. V. Krjačko	SUL	8.0 km	MPC · JPL
12422	1995 US_{8}	—	October 27, 1995	Kushiro	S. Ueda, H. Kaneda	PHO	5.4 km	MPC · JPL
12423 Slotin	1995 UQ_{16}	Slotin	October 17, 1995	Kitt Peak	Spacewatch	(5)	4.3 km	MPC · JPL
12424	1995 VM	—	November 2, 1995	Ōizumi	T. Kobayashi	EUN · slow	6.2 km	MPC · JPL
12425	1995 VG_{2}	—	November 12, 1995	Nachi-Katsuura	Y. Shimizu, T. Urata	V	4.7 km	MPC · JPL
12426 Racquetball	1995 VL_{2}	Racquetball	November 14, 1995	Haleakalā	AMOS	·	6.1 km	MPC · JPL
12427	1995 WM_{3}	—	November 21, 1995	Farra d'Isonzo	Farra d'Isonzo	·	3.1 km	MPC · JPL
12428	1995 WJ_{5}	—	November 24, 1995	Ōizumi	T. Kobayashi	·	6.9 km	MPC · JPL
12429	1995 WH_{7}	—	November 26, 1995	Ōizumi	T. Kobayashi	NYS ·	8.4 km	MPC · JPL
12430	1995 XB_{2}	—	December 14, 1995	Xinglong	SCAP	·	5.1 km	MPC · JPL
12431 Webster	1995 YY_{10}	Webster	December 18, 1995	Kitt Peak	Spacewatch	·	4.1 km	MPC · JPL
12432 Usuda	1996 AR_{1}	Usuda	January 12, 1996	Chichibu	N. Satō, T. Urata	·	8.0 km	MPC · JPL
12433 Barbieri	1996 AF_{4}	Barbieri	January 15, 1996	Cima Ekar	M. Tombelli, U. Munari	·	3.6 km	MPC · JPL
12434	1996 BM	—	January 16, 1996	Ōizumi	T. Kobayashi	·	6.9 km	MPC · JPL
12435 Sudachi	1996 BX	Sudachi	January 17, 1996	Kitami	K. Endate, K. Watanabe	KOR	6.2 km	MPC · JPL
12436	1996 BY_{1}	—	January 24, 1996	Ōizumi	T. Kobayashi	GEF	6.4 km	MPC · JPL
12437 Westlane	1996 BN_{6}	Westlane	January 18, 1996	Kitt Peak	Spacewatch	·	6.0 km	MPC · JPL
12438	1996 CZ	—	February 9, 1996	Cloudcroft	W. Offutt	·	4.1 km	MPC · JPL
12439 Okasaki	1996 CA_{3}	Okasaki	February 15, 1996	Nanyo	T. Okuni	THM	10 km	MPC · JPL
12440 Koshigayaboshi	1996 CF_{3}	Koshigayaboshi	February 11, 1996	Kitami	K. Endate, K. Watanabe	·	20 km	MPC · JPL
12441	1996 DV	—	February 19, 1996	Ōizumi	T. Kobayashi	·	6.0 km	MPC · JPL
12442 Beltramemass	1996 DO_{1}	Beltramemass	February 23, 1996	Stroncone	Santa Lucia	·	11 km	MPC · JPL
12443 Paulsydney	1996 EQ_{2}	Paulsydney	March 15, 1996	Haleakalā	AMOS	TIR	8.9 km	MPC · JPL
12444 Prothoon	1996 GE_{19}	Prothoon	April 15, 1996	La Silla	E. W. Elst	L5	64 km	MPC · JPL
12445 Sirataka	1996 HE_{2}	Sirataka	April 24, 1996	Nanyo	T. Okuni	·	11 km	MPC · JPL
12446 Juliabryant	1996 PZ_{6}	Juliabryant	August 15, 1996	Macquarie	R. H. McNaught, Child, J. B.	H	2.1 km	MPC · JPL
12447 Yatescup	1996 XA_{12}	Yatescup	December 4, 1996	Kitt Peak	Spacewatch	·	3.2 km	MPC · JPL
12448 Mr. Tompkins	1996 XW_{18}	Mr. Tompkins	December 12, 1996	Kleť	M. Tichý, Z. Moravec	V	3.1 km	MPC · JPL
12449	1996 XL_{31}	—	December 14, 1996	Ōizumi	T. Kobayashi	·	5.5 km	MPC · JPL
12450	1996 YD	—	December 20, 1996	Ōizumi	T. Kobayashi	slow	3.9 km	MPC · JPL
12451	1996 YF	—	December 20, 1996	Ōizumi	T. Kobayashi	·	3.6 km	MPC · JPL
12452	1996 YO	—	December 20, 1996	Ōizumi	T. Kobayashi	·	2.1 km	MPC · JPL
12453	1996 YY	—	December 20, 1996	Ōizumi	T. Kobayashi	·	7.1 km	MPC · JPL
12454	1996 YO_{1}	—	December 18, 1996	Xinglong	SCAP	NYS ·	6.4 km	MPC · JPL
12455	1997 AR	—	January 2, 1997	Ōizumi	T. Kobayashi	NYS ·	5.7 km	MPC · JPL
12456 Genichiaraki	1997 AC_{1}	Genichiaraki	January 2, 1997	Chichibu	N. Satō	·	3.3 km	MPC · JPL
12457	1997 AK_{1}	—	January 2, 1997	Ōizumi	T. Kobayashi	·	4.3 km	MPC · JPL
12458	1997 AR_{1}	—	January 2, 1997	Ōizumi	T. Kobayashi	NYS	4.8 km	MPC · JPL
12459	1997 AQ_{4}	—	January 6, 1997	Ōizumi	T. Kobayashi	(1338) (FLO)	2.3 km	MPC · JPL
12460 Mando	1997 AF_{5}	Mando	January 3, 1997	Chichibu	N. Satō	·	2.7 km	MPC · JPL
12461	1997 AM_{5}	—	January 7, 1997	Ōizumi	T. Kobayashi	·	4.3 km	MPC · JPL
12462	1997 AO_{5}	—	January 7, 1997	Ōizumi	T. Kobayashi	·	5.3 km	MPC · JPL
12463	1997 AL_{7}	—	January 9, 1997	Ōizumi	T. Kobayashi	·	7.0 km	MPC · JPL
12464 Manhattan	1997 AH_{8}	Manhattan	January 2, 1997	Kitt Peak	Spacewatch	V	2.3 km	MPC · JPL
12465 Perth Amboy	1997 AD_{10}	Perth Amboy	January 3, 1997	Kitt Peak	Spacewatch	slow	5.2 km	MPC · JPL
12466	1997 AS_{12}	—	January 10, 1997	Ōizumi	T. Kobayashi	·	4.7 km	MPC · JPL
12467	1997 AX_{17}	—	January 15, 1997	Ōizumi	T. Kobayashi	·	2.3 km	MPC · JPL
12468 Zachotín	1997 AE_{18}	Zachotín	January 14, 1997	Ondřejov	L. Kotková	·	3.4 km	MPC · JPL
12469 Katsuura	1997 AW_{18}	Katsuura	January 9, 1997	Chichibu	N. Satō	·	3.1 km	MPC · JPL
12470 Pinotti	1997 BC_{9}	Pinotti	January 31, 1997	Cima Ekar	M. Tombelli	·	4.6 km	MPC · JPL
12471 Larryscherr	1997 CZ_{6}	Larryscherr	February 6, 1997	Haleakalā	NEAT	NYS	3.4 km	MPC · JPL
12472 Samadhi	1997 CW_{11}	Samadhi	February 3, 1997	Kitt Peak	Spacewatch	·	2.9 km	MPC · JPL
12473 Levi-Civita	1997 CM_{19}	Levi-Civita	February 10, 1997	Prescott	P. G. Comba	EUN	4.2 km	MPC · JPL
12474	1997 CZ_{19}	—	February 12, 1997	Ōizumi	T. Kobayashi	·	4.1 km	MPC · JPL
12475	1997 CC_{20}	—	February 12, 1997	Ōizumi	T. Kobayashi	·	6.7 km	MPC · JPL
12476	1997 EU_{2}	—	March 4, 1997	Ōizumi	T. Kobayashi	NYS	2.9 km	MPC · JPL
12477 Haiku	1997 EY_{20}	Haiku	March 4, 1997	Kitt Peak	Spacewatch	NYS	3.3 km	MPC · JPL
12478 Suzukiseiji	1997 EX_{25}	Suzukiseiji	March 7, 1997	Nanyo	T. Okuni	NYS	4.0 km	MPC · JPL
12479 Ohshimaosamu	1997 EG_{27}	Ohshimaosamu	March 5, 1997	Kitt Peak	Spacewatch	·	2.4 km	MPC · JPL
12480	1997 EW_{45}	—	March 9, 1997	Xinglong	SCAP	·	3.0 km	MPC · JPL
12481 Streuvels	1997 EW_{47}	Streuvels	March 12, 1997	La Silla	E. W. Elst	·	13 km	MPC · JPL
12482 Pajka	1997 FG_{1}	Pajka	March 23, 1997	Modra	A. Galád, Pravda, A.	·	5.8 km	MPC · JPL
12483	1997 FW_{1}	—	March 28, 1997	Xinglong	SCAP	·	7.7 km	MPC · JPL
12484	1997 FO_{3}	—	March 31, 1997	Socorro	LINEAR	·	6.7 km	MPC · JPL
12485 Jenniferharris	1997 GO_{1}	Jenniferharris	April 7, 1997	Haleakalā	NEAT	NYS	4.9 km	MPC · JPL
12486	1997 GP_{6}	—	April 2, 1997	Socorro	LINEAR	·	6.0 km	MPC · JPL
12487	1997 GJ_{8}	—	April 2, 1997	Socorro	LINEAR	EOS	8.1 km	MPC · JPL
12488	1997 GD_{15}	—	April 3, 1997	Socorro	LINEAR	·	3.5 km	MPC · JPL
12489	1997 GR_{36}	—	April 7, 1997	Socorro	LINEAR	(5)	5.7 km	MPC · JPL
12490 Leiden	1997 JB_{13}	Leiden	May 3, 1997	La Silla	E. W. Elst	·	7.1 km	MPC · JPL
12491 Musschenbroek	1997 JE_{15}	Musschenbroek	May 3, 1997	La Silla	E. W. Elst	KOR	7.1 km	MPC · JPL
12492 Tanais	1997 JP_{16}	Tanais	May 3, 1997	La Silla	E. W. Elst	·	7.3 km	MPC · JPL
12493 Minkowski	1997 PM_{1}	Minkowski	August 4, 1997	Prescott	P. G. Comba	HYG	10 km	MPC · JPL
12494 Doughamilton	1998 DH_{11}	Doughamilton	February 25, 1998	Haleakalā	NEAT	H	2.5 km	MPC · JPL
12495	1998 FJ	—	March 18, 1998	Woomera	F. B. Zoltowski	·	2.4 km	MPC · JPL
12496 Ekholm	1998 FF_{9}	Ekholm	March 22, 1998	Kitt Peak	Spacewatch	NYS	3.1 km	MPC · JPL
12497 Ekkehard	1998 FQ_{14}	Ekkehard	March 26, 1998	Caussols	ODAS	·	4.8 km	MPC · JPL
12498 Dragesco	1998 FY_{14}	Dragesco	March 26, 1998	Caussols	ODAS	·	4.2 km	MPC · JPL
12499	1998 FR_{47}	—	March 20, 1998	Socorro	LINEAR	·	4.6 km	MPC · JPL
12500 Desngai	1998 FB_{49}	Desngai	March 20, 1998	Socorro	LINEAR	·	2.7 km	MPC · JPL

== 12501–12600 ==
back to top

Designation			Discovery			Properties		Ref
Permanent	Provisional	Named after	Date	Site	Discoverer(s)	Category	Diam.	Ref
12501 Nord	1998 FL_{66}	Nord	March 20, 1998	Socorro	LINEAR	·	4.9 km	MPC · JPL
12502	1998 FO_{68}	—	March 20, 1998	Socorro	LINEAR	NYS	4.8 km	MPC · JPL
12503 Danielpeterson	1998 FC_{75}	Danielpeterson	March 24, 1998	Socorro	LINEAR	GEF	4.3 km	MPC · JPL
12504 Nuest	1998 FS_{75}	Nuest	March 24, 1998	Socorro	LINEAR	·	3.9 km	MPC · JPL
12505	1998 FN_{77}	—	March 24, 1998	Socorro	LINEAR	·	3.6 km	MPC · JPL
12506 Pariser	1998 FR_{108}	Pariser	March 31, 1998	Socorro	LINEAR	·	3.5 km	MPC · JPL
12507	1998 FZ_{109}	—	March 31, 1998	Socorro	LINEAR	DOR	12 km	MPC · JPL
12508 Darcysloe	1998 FZ_{113}	Darcysloe	March 31, 1998	Socorro	LINEAR	·	3.3 km	MPC · JPL
12509 Pathak	1998 FY_{117}	Pathak	March 31, 1998	Socorro	LINEAR	·	2.9 km	MPC · JPL
12510	1998 FM_{121}	—	March 20, 1998	Socorro	LINEAR	·	4.5 km	MPC · JPL
12511 Patil	1998 FQ_{121}	Patil	March 20, 1998	Socorro	LINEAR	·	5.5 km	MPC · JPL
12512 Split	1998 HW_{7}	Split	April 21, 1998	Višnjan Observatory	K. Korlević, M. Dusić	(2076)	4.6 km	MPC · JPL
12513 Niven	1998 HC_{20}	Niven	April 27, 1998	Prescott	P. G. Comba	·	2.5 km	MPC · JPL
12514 Schommer	1998 HM_{26}	Schommer	April 20, 1998	Kitt Peak	Spacewatch	(5)	4.1 km	MPC · JPL
12515 Suiseki	1998 HE_{43}	Suiseki	April 30, 1998	Kitt Peak	Spacewatch	·	3.9 km	MPC · JPL
12516 Karenyoung	1998 HB_{45}	Karenyoung	April 20, 1998	Socorro	LINEAR	·	2.9 km	MPC · JPL
12517 Grayzeck	1998 HD_{52}	Grayzeck	April 30, 1998	Anderson Mesa	LONEOS	·	2.4 km	MPC · JPL
12518	1998 HM_{52}	—	April 27, 1998	Woomera	F. B. Zoltowski	·	4.5 km	MPC · JPL
12519 Pullen	1998 HH_{55}	Pullen	April 21, 1998	Socorro	LINEAR	·	3.9 km	MPC · JPL
12520	1998 HV_{78}	—	April 21, 1998	Socorro	LINEAR	·	3.3 km	MPC · JPL
12521	1998 HT_{95}	—	April 21, 1998	Socorro	LINEAR	NYS	5.3 km	MPC · JPL
12522 Rara	1998 HL_{99}	Rara	April 21, 1998	Socorro	LINEAR	·	2.7 km	MPC · JPL
12523	1998 HH_{100}	—	April 21, 1998	Socorro	LINEAR	fast	9.1 km	MPC · JPL
12524 Conscience	1998 HG_{103}	Conscience	April 25, 1998	La Silla	E. W. Elst	·	2.6 km	MPC · JPL
12525 Kathleenloia	1998 HT_{147}	Kathleenloia	April 23, 1998	Socorro	LINEAR	·	4.9 km	MPC · JPL
12526 de Coninck	1998 HZ_{147}	de Coninck	April 25, 1998	La Silla	E. W. Elst	·	3.0 km	MPC · JPL
12527 Anneraugh	1998 JE_{3}	Anneraugh	May 1, 1998	Anderson Mesa	LONEOS	·	6.3 km	MPC · JPL
12528	1998 KL_{31}	—	May 22, 1998	Socorro	LINEAR	EUN	6.7 km	MPC · JPL
12529 Reighard	1998 KG_{41}	Reighard	May 22, 1998	Socorro	LINEAR	·	2.3 km	MPC · JPL
12530 Richardson	1998 KO_{46}	Richardson	May 22, 1998	Socorro	LINEAR	·	8.2 km	MPC · JPL
12531	1998 KQ_{51}	—	May 23, 1998	Socorro	LINEAR	EOS ·	9.0 km	MPC · JPL
12532	1998 KW_{54}	—	May 23, 1998	Socorro	LINEAR	TIR	6.8 km	MPC · JPL
12533 Edmond	1998 LA	Edmond	June 2, 1998	Zeno	T. Stafford	·	3.2 km	MPC · JPL
12534 Janhoet	1998 LB_{3}	Janhoet	June 1, 1998	La Silla	E. W. Elst	·	4.9 km	MPC · JPL
12535 Fazlurahman	1998 MZ_{30}	Fazlurahman	June 24, 1998	Socorro	LINEAR	·	11 km	MPC · JPL
12536	1998 MD_{33}	—	June 24, 1998	Socorro	LINEAR	·	8.7 km	MPC · JPL
12537 Kendriddle	1998 MT_{34}	Kendriddle	June 24, 1998	Socorro	LINEAR	BAP	4.7 km	MPC · JPL
12538	1998 OH	—	July 19, 1998	Haleakalā	NEAT	APO +1km · PHA	1.7 km	MPC · JPL
12539 Chaikin	1998 OP_{2}	Chaikin	July 16, 1998	Kitt Peak	Spacewatch	NEM	8.6 km	MPC · JPL
12540 Picander	1998 OU_{9}	Picander	July 26, 1998	La Silla	E. W. Elst	KOR	7.2 km	MPC · JPL
12541 Makarska	1998 PD_{1}	Makarska	August 15, 1998	Višnjan Observatory	Višnjan	·	7.9 km	MPC · JPL
12542 Laver	1998 PN_{1}	Laver	August 10, 1998	Reedy Creek	J. Broughton	HYG	8.7 km	MPC · JPL
12543	1998 QM_{5}	—	August 23, 1998	Woomera	F. B. Zoltowski	·	6.8 km	MPC · JPL
12544	1998 QX_{9}	—	August 17, 1998	Socorro	LINEAR	·	11 km	MPC · JPL
12545 Taniamurphy	1998 QT_{19}	Taniamurphy	August 17, 1998	Socorro	LINEAR	·	4.9 km	MPC · JPL
12546	1998 QJ_{21}	—	August 17, 1998	Socorro	LINEAR	THM	12 km	MPC · JPL
12547	1998 QL_{22}	—	August 17, 1998	Socorro	LINEAR	·	8.4 km	MPC · JPL
12548 Erinriley	1998 QJ_{25}	Erinriley	August 17, 1998	Socorro	LINEAR	NYS	5.6 km	MPC · JPL
12549	1998 QO_{26}	—	August 17, 1998	Socorro	LINEAR	fast ·	11 km	MPC · JPL
12550	1998 QR_{30}	—	August 17, 1998	Socorro	LINEAR	EUN	6.6 km	MPC · JPL
12551	1998 QQ_{39}	—	August 17, 1998	Socorro	LINEAR	·	10 km	MPC · JPL
12552	1998 QQ_{45}	—	August 17, 1998	Socorro	LINEAR	·	19 km	MPC · JPL
12553 Aaronritter	1998 QZ_{46}	Aaronritter	August 17, 1998	Socorro	LINEAR	·	3.1 km	MPC · JPL
12554	1998 QA_{47}	—	August 17, 1998	Socorro	LINEAR	HYG	13 km	MPC · JPL
12555	1998 QP_{47}	—	August 17, 1998	Socorro	LINEAR	KOR	9.1 km	MPC · JPL
12556 Kyrobinson	1998 QG_{48}	Kyrobinson	August 17, 1998	Socorro	LINEAR	·	5.4 km	MPC · JPL
12557 Caracol	1998 QQ_{54}	Caracol	August 27, 1998	Anderson Mesa	LONEOS	·	10 km	MPC · JPL
12558	1998 QV_{63}	—	August 31, 1998	Xinglong	SCAP	AGN	5.3 km	MPC · JPL
12559	1998 QB_{69}	—	August 24, 1998	Socorro	LINEAR	(1118)	30 km	MPC · JPL
12560	1998 RC_{58}	—	September 14, 1998	Socorro	LINEAR	THM	16 km	MPC · JPL
12561 Howard	1998 SX_{7}	Howard	September 20, 1998	Kitt Peak	Spacewatch	THM	10 km	MPC · JPL
12562 Briangrazer	1998 SP_{36}	Briangrazer	September 19, 1998	Kitt Peak	Spacewatch	·	25 km	MPC · JPL
12563	1998 SA_{43}	—	September 20, 1998	Xinglong	SCAP	·	7.4 km	MPC · JPL
12564 Ikeller	1998 SO_{49}	Ikeller	September 22, 1998	Bergisch Gladbach	W. Bickel	KOR	5.4 km	MPC · JPL
12565 Khege	1998 SV_{53}	Khege	September 16, 1998	Anderson Mesa	LONEOS	·	14 km	MPC · JPL
12566 Derichardson	1998 SH_{54}	Derichardson	September 16, 1998	Anderson Mesa	LONEOS	HYG	11 km	MPC · JPL
12567 Herreweghe	1998 SU_{71}	Herreweghe	September 21, 1998	La Silla	E. W. Elst	THM	10 km	MPC · JPL
12568 Kuffner	1998 VB_{5}	Kuffner	November 11, 1998	Višnjan Observatory	K. Korlević	·	6.6 km	MPC · JPL
12569	1998 VC_{29}	—	November 10, 1998	Socorro	LINEAR	·	16 km	MPC · JPL
12570	1998 WV_{5}	—	November 18, 1998	Nachi-Katsuura	Y. Shimizu, T. Urata	·	15 km	MPC · JPL
12571 Occhiogrosso	1999 NM_{2}	Occhiogrosso	July 12, 1999	Socorro	LINEAR	·	3.4 km	MPC · JPL
12572 Sadegh	1999 NN_{8}	Sadegh	July 13, 1999	Socorro	LINEAR	(1338) (FLO)	3.0 km	MPC · JPL
12573	1999 NJ_{53}	—	July 12, 1999	Socorro	LINEAR	·	9.2 km	MPC · JPL
12574 LONEOS	1999 RT	LONEOS	September 4, 1999	Fountain Hills	C. W. Juels	·	7.4 km	MPC · JPL
12575 Palmaria	1999 RH_{1}	Palmaria	September 4, 1999	Monte Viseggi	Pietrapiana, P., L. Sannino	·	2.9 km	MPC · JPL
12576 Oresme	1999 RP_{1}	Oresme	September 5, 1999	Prescott	P. G. Comba	·	5.0 km	MPC · JPL
12577 Samra	1999 RA_{13}	Samra	September 7, 1999	Socorro	LINEAR	slow	6.5 km	MPC · JPL
12578 Bensaur	1999 RF_{17}	Bensaur	September 7, 1999	Socorro	LINEAR	·	2.9 km	MPC · JPL
12579 Ceva	1999 RA_{28}	Ceva	September 5, 1999	Bologna	San Vittore	·	6.6 km	MPC · JPL
12580 Antonini	1999 RM_{33}	Antonini	September 8, 1999	Saint-Michel-sur-Meurthe	L. Bernasconi	·	7.9 km	MPC · JPL
12581 Rovinj	1999 RE_{34}	Rovinj	September 8, 1999	Višnjan Observatory	Višnjan	·	2.6 km	MPC · JPL
12582	1999 RY_{34}	—	September 11, 1999	Višnjan Observatory	Višnjan	·	5.1 km	MPC · JPL
12583 Buckjean	1999 RC_{35}	Buckjean	September 11, 1999	High Point	D. K. Chesney	·	26 km	MPC · JPL
12584 Zeljkoandreic	1999 RF_{36}	Zeljkoandreic	September 12, 1999	Višnjan Observatory	K. Korlević	V	2.5 km	MPC · JPL
12585 Katschwarz	1999 RN_{64}	Katschwarz	September 7, 1999	Socorro	LINEAR	(5)	3.5 km	MPC · JPL
12586 Juliaspeyer	1999 RQ_{81}	Juliaspeyer	September 7, 1999	Socorro	LINEAR	·	5.6 km	MPC · JPL
12587	1999 RD_{95}	—	September 7, 1999	Socorro	LINEAR	AGN	6.7 km	MPC · JPL
12588 Arseneau	1999 RR_{98}	Arseneau	September 7, 1999	Socorro	LINEAR	PHO	5.5 km	MPC · JPL
12589 Davidanand	1999 RR_{114}	Davidanand	September 9, 1999	Socorro	LINEAR	·	2.6 km	MPC · JPL
12590 Ballantine	1999 RN_{125}	Ballantine	September 9, 1999	Socorro	LINEAR	·	4.3 km	MPC · JPL
12591 Bergey	1999 RT_{133}	Bergey	September 9, 1999	Socorro	LINEAR	V	3.9 km	MPC · JPL
12592 Brianchen	1999 RD_{134}	Brianchen	September 9, 1999	Socorro	LINEAR	·	4.6 km	MPC · JPL
12593 Shashlov	1999 RQ_{136}	Shashlov	September 9, 1999	Socorro	LINEAR	·	3.0 km	MPC · JPL
12594 Sidorclare	1999 RU_{145}	Sidorclare	September 9, 1999	Socorro	LINEAR	·	6.2 km	MPC · JPL
12595 Amandashaw	1999 RD_{149}	Amandashaw	September 9, 1999	Socorro	LINEAR	·	4.8 km	MPC · JPL
12596 Shukla	1999 RT_{154}	Shukla	September 9, 1999	Socorro	LINEAR	·	3.4 km	MPC · JPL
12597 Williamdaniel	1999 RL_{158}	Williamdaniel	September 9, 1999	Socorro	LINEAR	KOR	5.5 km	MPC · JPL
12598 Sierra	1999 RC_{159}	Sierra	September 9, 1999	Socorro	LINEAR	GEF	4.7 km	MPC · JPL
12599 Singhal	1999 RT_{160}	Singhal	September 9, 1999	Socorro	LINEAR	·	3.0 km	MPC · JPL
12600	1999 RM_{177}	—	September 9, 1999	Socorro	LINEAR	(3460)	14 km	MPC · JPL

== 12601–12700 ==
back to top

Designation			Discovery			Properties		Ref
Permanent	Provisional	Named after	Date	Site	Discoverer(s)	Category	Diam.	Ref
12601 Tiffanyswann	1999 RO_{178}	Tiffanyswann	September 9, 1999	Socorro	LINEAR	NYS ·	6.0 km	MPC · JPL
12602 Tammytam	1999 RT_{183}	Tammytam	September 9, 1999	Socorro	LINEAR	V	2.7 km	MPC · JPL
12603 Tanchunghee	1999 RF_{184}	Tanchunghee	September 9, 1999	Socorro	LINEAR	NYS	2.4 km	MPC · JPL
12604 Lisatate	1999 RC_{194}	Lisatate	September 7, 1999	Socorro	LINEAR	·	2.5 km	MPC · JPL
12605	1999 SK	—	September 17, 1999	Višnjan Observatory	Višnjan	·	3.0 km	MPC · JPL
12606 Apuleius	2043 P-L	Apuleius	September 24, 1960	Palomar	C. J. van Houten, I. van Houten-Groeneveld, T. Gehrels	·	2.3 km	MPC · JPL
12607 Alcaeus	2058 P-L	Alcaeus	September 24, 1960	Palomar	C. J. van Houten, I. van Houten-Groeneveld, T. Gehrels	·	5.9 km	MPC · JPL
12608 Aesop	2091 P-L	Aesop	September 24, 1960	Palomar	C. J. van Houten, I. van Houten-Groeneveld, T. Gehrels	·	2.9 km	MPC · JPL
12609 Apollodoros	2155 P-L	Apollodoros	September 24, 1960	Palomar	C. J. van Houten, I. van Houten-Groeneveld, T. Gehrels	THM	8.9 km	MPC · JPL
12610 Hãfez	2551 P-L	Hãfez	September 24, 1960	Palomar	C. J. van Houten, I. van Houten-Groeneveld, T. Gehrels	·	5.1 km	MPC · JPL
12611 Ingres	2555 P-L	Ingres	September 24, 1960	Palomar	C. J. van Houten, I. van Houten-Groeneveld, T. Gehrels	·	7.0 km	MPC · JPL
12612 Daumier	2592 P-L	Daumier	September 24, 1960	Palomar	C. J. van Houten, I. van Houten-Groeneveld, T. Gehrels	·	3.4 km	MPC · JPL
12613 Hogarth	4024 P-L	Hogarth	September 24, 1960	Palomar	C. J. van Houten, I. van Houten-Groeneveld, T. Gehrels	·	7.8 km	MPC · JPL
12614 Hokusai	4119 P-L	Hokusai	September 24, 1960	Palomar	C. J. van Houten, I. van Houten-Groeneveld, T. Gehrels	·	2.9 km	MPC · JPL
12615 Mendesdeleon	4626 P-L	Mendesdeleon	September 24, 1960	Palomar	C. J. van Houten, I. van Houten-Groeneveld, T. Gehrels	KOR	4.7 km	MPC · JPL
12616 Lochner	4874 P-L	Lochner	September 26, 1960	Palomar	C. J. van Houten, I. van Houten-Groeneveld, T. Gehrels	·	4.5 km	MPC · JPL
12617 Angelusilesius	5568 P-L	Angelusilesius	October 17, 1960	Palomar	C. J. van Houten, I. van Houten-Groeneveld, T. Gehrels	·	11 km	MPC · JPL
12618 Cellarius	6217 P-L	Cellarius	September 24, 1960	Palomar	C. J. van Houten, I. van Houten-Groeneveld, T. Gehrels	·	10 km	MPC · JPL
12619 Anubelshunu	6242 P-L	Anubelshunu	September 24, 1960	Palomar	C. J. van Houten, I. van Houten-Groeneveld, T. Gehrels	V	2.9 km	MPC · JPL
12620 Simaqian	6335 P-L	Simaqian	September 24, 1960	Palomar	C. J. van Houten, I. van Houten-Groeneveld, T. Gehrels	THM	8.3 km	MPC · JPL
12621 Alsufi	6585 P-L	Alsufi	September 24, 1960	Palomar	C. J. van Houten, I. van Houten-Groeneveld, T. Gehrels	·	8.6 km	MPC · JPL
12622 Doppelmayr	6614 P-L	Doppelmayr	September 24, 1960	Palomar	C. J. van Houten, I. van Houten-Groeneveld, T. Gehrels	·	3.1 km	MPC · JPL
12623 Tawaddud	9544 P-L	Tawaddud	October 17, 1960	Palomar	C. J. van Houten, I. van Houten-Groeneveld, T. Gehrels	·	3.6 km	MPC · JPL
12624 Mariacunitia	9565 P-L	Mariacunitia	October 17, 1960	Palomar	C. J. van Houten, I. van Houten-Groeneveld, T. Gehrels	·	3.3 km	MPC · JPL
12625 Koopman	9578 P-L	Koopman	October 17, 1960	Palomar	C. J. van Houten, I. van Houten-Groeneveld, T. Gehrels	·	14 km	MPC · JPL
12626 Timmerman	1116 T-1	Timmerman	March 25, 1971	Palomar	C. J. van Houten, I. van Houten-Groeneveld, T. Gehrels	·	6.8 km	MPC · JPL
12627 Maryedwards	1230 T-1	Maryedwards	March 25, 1971	Palomar	C. J. van Houten, I. van Houten-Groeneveld, T. Gehrels	·	2.0 km	MPC · JPL
12628 Acworthorr	2120 T-1	Acworthorr	March 25, 1971	Palomar	C. J. van Houten, I. van Houten-Groeneveld, T. Gehrels	·	5.0 km	MPC · JPL
12629 Jandeboer	2168 T-1	Jandeboer	March 25, 1971	Palomar	C. J. van Houten, I. van Houten-Groeneveld, T. Gehrels	·	6.5 km	MPC · JPL
12630 Verstappen	3033 T-1	Verstappen	March 26, 1971	Palomar	C. J. van Houten, I. van Houten-Groeneveld, T. Gehrels	V	2.4 km	MPC · JPL
12631 Mariekebaan	3051 T-1	Mariekebaan	March 26, 1971	Palomar	C. J. van Houten, I. van Houten-Groeneveld, T. Gehrels	·	7.7 km	MPC · JPL
12632 Mignonette	3105 T-1	Mignonette	March 26, 1971	Palomar	C. J. van Houten, I. van Houten-Groeneveld, T. Gehrels	NYS ·	6.1 km	MPC · JPL
12633 Warmenhoven	3119 T-1	Warmenhoven	March 26, 1971	Palomar	C. J. van Houten, I. van Houten-Groeneveld, T. Gehrels	·	4.8 km	MPC · JPL
12634 LOFAR	3178 T-1	LOFAR	March 26, 1971	Palomar	C. J. van Houten, I. van Houten-Groeneveld, T. Gehrels	·	3.1 km	MPC · JPL
12635 Hennylamers	4220 T-1	Hennylamers	March 26, 1971	Palomar	C. J. van Houten, I. van Houten-Groeneveld, T. Gehrels	EOS	6.3 km	MPC · JPL
12636 Padrielli	4854 T-1	Padrielli	May 13, 1971	Palomar	C. J. van Houten, I. van Houten-Groeneveld, T. Gehrels	EOS	7.8 km	MPC · JPL
12637 Gustavleonhardt	1053 T-2	Gustavleonhardt	September 29, 1973	Palomar	C. J. van Houten, I. van Houten-Groeneveld, T. Gehrels	·	7.3 km	MPC · JPL
12638 Fransbrüggen	1063 T-2	Fransbrüggen	September 29, 1973	Palomar	C. J. van Houten, I. van Houten-Groeneveld, T. Gehrels	NYS	3.5 km	MPC · JPL
12639 Tonkoopman	1105 T-2	Tonkoopman	September 29, 1973	Palomar	C. J. van Houten, I. van Houten-Groeneveld, T. Gehrels	·	5.6 km	MPC · JPL
12640 Reinbertdeleeuw	1231 T-2	Reinbertdeleeuw	September 29, 1973	Palomar	C. J. van Houten, I. van Houten-Groeneveld, T. Gehrels	KOR	5.1 km	MPC · JPL
12641 Hubertushenrichs	1310 T-2	Hubertushenrichs	September 29, 1973	Palomar	C. J. van Houten, I. van Houten-Groeneveld, T. Gehrels	·	2.2 km	MPC · JPL
12642 Davidjansen	1348 T-2	Davidjansen	September 29, 1973	Palomar	C. J. van Houten, I. van Houten-Groeneveld, T. Gehrels	·	4.6 km	MPC · JPL
12643 Henkolthof	3180 T-2	Henkolthof	September 30, 1973	Palomar	C. J. van Houten, I. van Houten-Groeneveld, T. Gehrels	KOR	4.6 km	MPC · JPL
12644 Robertwielinga	3285 T-2	Robertwielinga	September 30, 1973	Palomar	C. J. van Houten, I. van Houten-Groeneveld, T. Gehrels	·	5.2 km	MPC · JPL
12645 Jacobrosales	4240 T-2	Jacobrosales	September 29, 1973	Palomar	C. J. van Houten, I. van Houten-Groeneveld, T. Gehrels	NYS	2.3 km	MPC · JPL
12646 Avercamp	5175 T-2	Avercamp	September 25, 1973	Palomar	C. J. van Houten, I. van Houten-Groeneveld, T. Gehrels	·	6.1 km	MPC · JPL
12647 Pauluspotter	5332 T-2	Pauluspotter	September 30, 1973	Palomar	C. J. van Houten, I. van Houten-Groeneveld, T. Gehrels	·	3.9 km	MPC · JPL
12648 Ibarbourou	1135 T-3	Ibarbourou	October 17, 1977	Palomar	C. J. van Houten, I. van Houten-Groeneveld, T. Gehrels	V	3.4 km	MPC · JPL
12649 Ascanios	2035 T-3	Ascanios	October 16, 1977	Palomar	C. J. van Houten, I. van Houten-Groeneveld, T. Gehrels	L5	25 km	MPC · JPL
12650 de Vries	2247 T-3	de Vries	October 16, 1977	Palomar	C. J. van Houten, I. van Houten-Groeneveld, T. Gehrels	ERI	5.3 km	MPC · JPL
12651 Frenkel	2268 T-3	Frenkel	October 16, 1977	Palomar	C. J. van Houten, I. van Houten-Groeneveld, T. Gehrels	EOS	5.8 km	MPC · JPL
12652 Groningen	2622 T-3	Groningen	October 16, 1977	Palomar	C. J. van Houten, I. van Houten-Groeneveld, T. Gehrels	·	6.5 km	MPC · JPL
12653 van der Klis	2664 T-3	van der Klis	October 11, 1977	Palomar	C. J. van Houten, I. van Houten-Groeneveld, T. Gehrels	NYS ·	3.9 km	MPC · JPL
12654 Heinofalcke	4118 T-3	Heinofalcke	October 16, 1977	Palomar	C. J. van Houten, I. van Houten-Groeneveld, T. Gehrels	EOS	6.4 km	MPC · JPL
12655 Benferinga	5041 T-3	Benferinga	October 16, 1977	Palomar	C. J. van Houten, I. van Houten-Groeneveld, T. Gehrels	EOS	10 km	MPC · JPL
12656 Gerdebruijn	5170 T-3	Gerdebruijn	October 16, 1977	Palomar	C. J. van Houten, I. van Houten-Groeneveld, T. Gehrels	·	3.2 km	MPC · JPL
12657 Bonch-Bruevich	1971 QO_{1}	Bonch-Bruevich	August 30, 1971	Nauchnij	T. M. Smirnova	EOS	8.9 km	MPC · JPL
12658 Peiraios	1973 SL	Peiraios	September 19, 1973	Palomar	C. J. van Houten, I. van Houten-Groeneveld, T. Gehrels	L4	26 km	MPC · JPL
12659 Schlegel	1973 UR_{5}	Schlegel	October 27, 1973	Tautenburg Observatory	F. Börngen	NYS	4.2 km	MPC · JPL
12660	1975 NC	—	July 15, 1975	Cerro El Roble	C. Torres, Barros, S.	·	4.8 km	MPC · JPL
12661 Schelling	1976 DA_{1}	Schelling	February 27, 1976	Tautenburg Observatory	F. Börngen	·	3.3 km	MPC · JPL
12662	1978 CK	—	February 2, 1978	Palomar	Gibson, J.	·	15 km	MPC · JPL
12663 Björkegren	1978 RL_{7}	Björkegren	September 2, 1978	La Silla	C.-I. Lagerkvist	KOR	5.2 km	MPC · JPL
12664 Sonisenia	1978 SS_{5}	Sonisenia	September 27, 1978	Nauchnij	L. I. Chernykh	(5)	7.3 km	MPC · JPL
12665 Chriscarson	1978 VE_{7}	Chriscarson	November 6, 1978	Palomar	E. F. Helin, S. J. Bus	·	2.8 km	MPC · JPL
12666 Mikeauldridge	1978 XW	Mikeauldridge	December 6, 1978	Palomar	E. Bowell, Warnock, A.	·	9.1 km	MPC · JPL
12667	1979 DF	—	February 28, 1979	Anderson Mesa	N. G. Thomas	·	9.2 km	MPC · JPL
12668 Scottstarin	1979 MX_{1}	Scottstarin	June 25, 1979	Siding Spring	E. F. Helin, S. J. Bus	·	7.3 km	MPC · JPL
12669 Emilybrisnehan	1979 MY_{5}	Emilybrisnehan	June 25, 1979	Siding Spring	E. F. Helin, S. J. Bus	·	5.7 km	MPC · JPL
12670 Passargea	1979 SG_{2}	Passargea	September 22, 1979	Nauchnij	N. S. Chernykh	·	2.1 km	MPC · JPL
12671 Thörnqvist	1980 FU	Thörnqvist	March 16, 1980	La Silla	C.-I. Lagerkvist	·	4.2 km	MPC · JPL
12672 Nygårdh	1980 FY_{2}	Nygårdh	March 16, 1980	La Silla	C.-I. Lagerkvist	·	5.1 km	MPC · JPL
12673 Kiselman	1980 FH_{3}	Kiselman	March 16, 1980	La Silla	C.-I. Lagerkvist	·	7.8 km	MPC · JPL
12674 Rybalka	1980 RL_{2}	Rybalka	September 7, 1980	Nauchnij	N. S. Chernykh	NYS	3.7 km	MPC · JPL
12675 Chabot	1980 TA_{4}	Chabot	October 9, 1980	Palomar	C. S. Shoemaker, E. M. Shoemaker	·	7.7 km	MPC · JPL
12676 Dianemerline	1981 DU_{1}	Dianemerline	February 28, 1981	Siding Spring	S. J. Bus	·	4.2 km	MPC · JPL
12677 Gritsavage	1981 EO_{4}	Gritsavage	March 2, 1981	Siding Spring	S. J. Bus	EOS	4.7 km	MPC · JPL
12678 Gerhardus	1981 EQ_{20}	Gerhardus	March 2, 1981	Siding Spring	S. J. Bus	·	3.1 km	MPC · JPL
12679 Jamessimpson	1981 EK_{22}	Jamessimpson	March 2, 1981	Siding Spring	S. J. Bus	KOR	4.7 km	MPC · JPL
12680 Bogdanovich	1981 JR_{2}	Bogdanovich	May 6, 1981	Palomar	C. S. Shoemaker	·	2.3 km	MPC · JPL
12681 Pevear	1981 UL_{29}	Pevear	October 24, 1981	Palomar	S. J. Bus	·	5.8 km	MPC · JPL
12682 Kawada	1982 VC_{3}	Kawada	November 14, 1982	Kiso	H. Kosai, K. Furukawa	(5)	3.5 km	MPC · JPL
12683	1983 RP_{3}	—	September 2, 1983	La Silla	H. Debehogne	·	6.1 km	MPC · JPL
12684	1984 DQ	—	February 23, 1984	La Silla	H. Debehogne	·	9.3 km	MPC · JPL
12685	1985 VE	—	November 14, 1985	Brorfelde	P. Jensen	·	6.7 km	MPC · JPL
12686 Bezuglyj	1986 TT_{11}	Bezuglyj	October 3, 1986	Nauchnij	L. G. Karachkina	EUN	5.7 km	MPC · JPL
12687 de Valory	1987 YS_{1}	de Valory	December 17, 1987	La Silla	E. W. Elst, G. Pizarro	EUN	6.8 km	MPC · JPL
12688 Baekeland	1988 CK_{4}	Baekeland	February 13, 1988	La Silla	E. W. Elst	EUN	5.3 km	MPC · JPL
12689	1988 RO_{2}	—	September 8, 1988	Brorfelde	P. Jensen	EOS	7.9 km	MPC · JPL
12690 Kochimiraikagaku	1988 VG_{1}	Kochimiraikagaku	November 5, 1988	Geisei	T. Seki	slow	15 km	MPC · JPL
12691	1988 VF_{2}	—	November 7, 1988	Yatsugatake	Y. Kushida, Inoue, M.	V	7.4 km	MPC · JPL
12692	1989 BV_{1}	—	January 29, 1989	Kleť	A. Mrkos	NYS	4.8 km	MPC · JPL
12693	1989 EZ	—	March 9, 1989	Gekko	Y. Oshima	·	8.1 km	MPC · JPL
12694 Schleiermacher	1989 EJ_{6}	Schleiermacher	March 7, 1989	Tautenburg Observatory	F. Börngen	THM	8.5 km	MPC · JPL
12695 Utrecht	1989 GR_{3}	Utrecht	April 1, 1989	La Silla	E. W. Elst	·	3.8 km	MPC · JPL
12696 Camus	1989 SF_{1}	Camus	September 26, 1989	La Silla	E. W. Elst	·	9.3 km	MPC · JPL
12697 Verhaeren	1989 SK_{3}	Verhaeren	September 26, 1989	La Silla	E. W. Elst	DOR	14 km	MPC · JPL
12698	1989 US_{4}	—	October 22, 1989	Kleť	A. Mrkos	·	5.6 km	MPC · JPL
12699	1990 DD_{2}	—	February 24, 1990	La Silla	H. Debehogne	·	5.0 km	MPC · JPL
12700	1990 FH	—	March 23, 1990	Palomar	E. F. Helin	PHO	3.7 km	MPC · JPL

== 12701–12800 ==
back to top

Designation			Discovery			Properties		Ref
Permanent	Provisional	Named after	Date	Site	Discoverer(s)	Category	Diam.	Ref
12701 Chénier	1990 GE	Chénier	April 15, 1990	La Silla	E. W. Elst	·	4.3 km	MPC · JPL
12702 Panamarenko	1990 SR_{6}	Panamarenko	September 22, 1990	La Silla	E. W. Elst	·	4.4 km	MPC · JPL
12703	1990 SV_{13}	—	September 23, 1990	La Silla	H. Debehogne	(5)	4.8 km	MPC · JPL
12704 Tupolev	1990 SL_{28}	Tupolev	September 24, 1990	Nauchnij	L. V. Zhuravleva, G. R. Kastelʹ	·	6.0 km	MPC · JPL
12705	1990 TJ	—	October 12, 1990	Siding Spring	R. H. McNaught	·	5.5 km	MPC · JPL
12706 Tanezaki	1990 TE_{1}	Tanezaki	October 15, 1990	Geisei	T. Seki	(1547)	6.9 km	MPC · JPL
12707	1990 UK	—	October 20, 1990	Oohira	T. Urata	MAR	5.7 km	MPC · JPL
12708 Van Straten	1990 UB_{4}	Van Straten	October 16, 1990	La Silla	E. W. Elst	·	4.7 km	MPC · JPL
12709 Bergen op Zoom	1990 VN_{4}	Bergen op Zoom	November 15, 1990	La Silla	E. W. Elst	EUN	5.6 km	MPC · JPL
12710 Breda	1990 VQ_{5}	Breda	November 15, 1990	La Silla	E. W. Elst	·	4.6 km	MPC · JPL
12711 Tukmit	1991 BB	Tukmit	January 19, 1991	Palomar	J. E. Mueller	APO +1km	2.2 km	MPC · JPL
12712	1991 EY_{3}	—	March 12, 1991	La Silla	H. Debehogne	·	12 km	MPC · JPL
12713	1991 FY_{3}	—	March 22, 1991	La Silla	H. Debehogne	·	12 km	MPC · JPL
12714 Alkimos	1991 GX_{1}	Alkimos	April 15, 1991	Palomar	C. S. Shoemaker, E. M. Shoemaker	L4	48 km	MPC · JPL
12715 Godin	1991 GR_{2}	Godin	April 8, 1991	La Silla	E. W. Elst	·	4.4 km	MPC · JPL
12716 Delft	1991 GD_{8}	Delft	April 8, 1991	La Silla	E. W. Elst	EOS	6.5 km	MPC · JPL
12717	1991 HK	—	April 16, 1991	Dynic	A. Sugie	·	2.8 km	MPC · JPL
12718 Le Gentil	1991 LF_{1}	Le Gentil	June 6, 1991	La Silla	E. W. Elst	·	3.6 km	MPC · JPL
12719 Pingré	1991 LP_{2}	Pingré	June 6, 1991	La Silla	E. W. Elst	·	3.5 km	MPC · JPL
12720	1991 NU_{3}	—	July 6, 1991	La Silla	H. Debehogne	·	4.6 km	MPC · JPL
12721	1991 PB	—	August 3, 1991	Kiyosato	S. Otomo	·	6.4 km	MPC · JPL
12722 Petrarca	1991 PT_{1}	Petrarca	August 10, 1991	La Silla	E. W. Elst	·	4.4 km	MPC · JPL
12723	1991 PD_{10}	—	August 7, 1991	Palomar	H. E. Holt	·	6.4 km	MPC · JPL
12724	1991 PZ_{14}	—	August 6, 1991	Palomar	H. E. Holt	·	5.6 km	MPC · JPL
12725	1991 PP_{16}	—	August 7, 1991	Palomar	H. E. Holt	·	5.0 km	MPC · JPL
12726	1991 PQ_{16}	—	August 7, 1991	Palomar	H. E. Holt	·	6.9 km	MPC · JPL
12727 Cavendish	1991 PB_{20}	Cavendish	August 14, 1991	La Silla	E. W. Elst	·	4.1 km	MPC · JPL
12728	1991 RP_{1}	—	September 10, 1991	Dynic	A. Sugie	MAR	5.9 km	MPC · JPL
12729 Berger	1991 RL_{7}	Berger	September 13, 1991	Tautenburg Observatory	F. Börngen, L. D. Schmadel	·	7.2 km	MPC · JPL
12730	1991 RU_{8}	—	September 11, 1991	Palomar	H. E. Holt	·	5.0 km	MPC · JPL
12731	1991 RW_{12}	—	September 10, 1991	Palomar	H. E. Holt	·	4.9 km	MPC · JPL
12732	1991 TN	—	October 1, 1991	Siding Spring	R. H. McNaught	·	5.3 km	MPC · JPL
12733	1991 TV_{1}	—	October 13, 1991	Kiyosato	S. Otomo	·	6.7 km	MPC · JPL
12734 Haruna	1991 UF_{3}	Haruna	October 29, 1991	Kitami	A. Takahashi, K. Watanabe	PHO	4.0 km	MPC · JPL
12735	1991 VV_{1}	—	November 4, 1991	Yatsugatake	Y. Kushida, O. Muramatsu	PHO	5.0 km	MPC · JPL
12736	1991 VC_{3}	—	November 13, 1991	Kiyosato	S. Otomo	PHO	3.6 km	MPC · JPL
12737	1991 VW_{4}	—	November 10, 1991	Kiyosato	S. Otomo	V	3.8 km	MPC · JPL
12738 Satoshimiki	1992 AL	Satoshimiki	January 4, 1992	Okutama	Hioki, T., Hayakawa, S.	·	12 km	MPC · JPL
12739	1992 DY_{7}	—	February 29, 1992	La Silla	UESAC	(12739)	4.1 km	MPC · JPL
12740	1992 EX_{8}	—	March 2, 1992	La Silla	UESAC	MAR	9.3 km	MPC · JPL
12741	1992 EU_{30}	—	March 1, 1992	La Silla	UESAC	·	4.1 km	MPC · JPL
12742 Delisle	1992 OF_{1}	Delisle	July 26, 1992	Caussols	E. W. Elst	·	25 km	MPC · JPL
12743	1992 PL_{2}	—	August 2, 1992	Palomar	H. E. Holt	·	16 km	MPC · JPL
12744	1992 SQ	—	September 26, 1992	Dynic	A. Sugie	·	2.9 km	MPC · JPL
12745 Kazujinishimura	1992 UL_{2}	Kazujinishimura	October 21, 1992	Kani	Y. Mizuno, T. Furuta	·	3.4 km	MPC · JPL
12746 Yumeginga	1992 WC_{1}	Yumeginga	November 16, 1992	Kitami	M. Yanai, K. Watanabe	slow	4.5 km	MPC · JPL
12747 Michageffert	1992 YN_{2}	Michageffert	December 18, 1992	Caussols	E. W. Elst	·	3.2 km	MPC · JPL
12748	1993 BP_{3}	—	January 30, 1993	Yakiimo	Natori, A., T. Urata	PHO	4.2 km	MPC · JPL
12749 Odokaigan	1993 CB	Odokaigan	February 2, 1993	Geisei	T. Seki	·	3.3 km	MPC · JPL
12750 Berthollet	1993 DJ_{1}	Berthollet	February 18, 1993	Haute-Provence	E. W. Elst	·	6.6 km	MPC · JPL
12751 Kamihayashi	1993 EU	Kamihayashi	March 15, 1993	Kitami	K. Endate, K. Watanabe	NYS	3.7 km	MPC · JPL
12752 Kvarnis	1993 FR_{35}	Kvarnis	March 19, 1993	La Silla	UESAC	·	5.1 km	MPC · JPL
12753 Povenmire	1993 HE	Povenmire	April 18, 1993	Palomar	C. S. Shoemaker, E. M. Shoemaker	·	7.6 km	MPC · JPL
12754	1993 LF_{2}	—	June 15, 1993	Palomar	H. E. Holt	GEF	6.9 km	MPC · JPL
12755 Balmer	1993 OS_{10}	Balmer	July 20, 1993	La Silla	E. W. Elst	PAD	9.4 km	MPC · JPL
12756	1993 QE_{1}	—	August 19, 1993	Palomar	E. F. Helin	EUN	6.6 km	MPC · JPL
12757 Yangtze	1993 RY_{11}	Yangtze	September 14, 1993	La Silla	H. Debehogne, E. W. Elst	KOR	5.4 km	MPC · JPL
12758 Kabudari	1993 SM_{3}	Kabudari	September 22, 1993	Mérida	Naranjo, O. A.	THM	8.3 km	MPC · JPL
12759 Joule	1993 TL_{18}	Joule	October 9, 1993	La Silla	E. W. Elst	HYG	13 km	MPC · JPL
12760 Maxwell	1993 TX_{26}	Maxwell	October 9, 1993	La Silla	E. W. Elst	EOS	6.7 km	MPC · JPL
12761 Pauwels	1993 TP_{38}	Pauwels	October 9, 1993	La Silla	E. W. Elst	·	9.7 km	MPC · JPL
12762 Nadiavittor	1993 UE_{1}	Nadiavittor	October 26, 1993	Farra d'Isonzo	Farra d'Isonzo	·	5.5 km	MPC · JPL
12763	1993 UQ_{2}	—	October 19, 1993	Palomar	E. F. Helin	EOS	8.6 km	MPC · JPL
12764	1993 VA_{2}	—	November 11, 1993	Kushiro	S. Ueda, H. Kaneda	EOS	19 km	MPC · JPL
12765	1993 VA_{3}	—	November 11, 1993	Kushiro	S. Ueda, H. Kaneda	EOS	10 km	MPC · JPL
12766 Paschen	1993 VV_{4}	Paschen	November 9, 1993	Caussols	E. W. Elst	·	10 km	MPC · JPL
12767	1994 AS	—	January 4, 1994	Ōizumi	T. Kobayashi	·	12 km	MPC · JPL
12768	1994 EQ_{1}	—	March 10, 1994	Ōizumi	T. Kobayashi	fast	3.9 km	MPC · JPL
12769 Kandakurenai	1994 FF	Kandakurenai	March 18, 1994	Kitami	K. Endate, K. Watanabe	·	4.2 km	MPC · JPL
12770	1994 GF	—	April 3, 1994	Ōizumi	T. Kobayashi	·	2.7 km	MPC · JPL
12771 Kimshin	1994 GA_{1}	Kimshin	April 5, 1994	Kitami	K. Endate, K. Watanabe	·	4.2 km	MPC · JPL
12772	1994 GM_{1}	—	April 14, 1994	Ōizumi	T. Kobayashi	·	4.2 km	MPC · JPL
12773 Lyman	1994 PJ_{10}	Lyman	August 10, 1994	La Silla	E. W. Elst	·	3.7 km	MPC · JPL
12774 Pfund	1994 PH_{22}	Pfund	August 12, 1994	La Silla	E. W. Elst	·	5.4 km	MPC · JPL
12775 Brackett	1994 PX_{22}	Brackett	August 12, 1994	La Silla	E. W. Elst	·	4.2 km	MPC · JPL
12776 Reynolds	1994 PT_{31}	Reynolds	August 12, 1994	La Silla	E. W. Elst	·	3.0 km	MPC · JPL
12777 Manuel	1994 QA_{1}	Manuel	August 27, 1994	Pleiade	P. Antolini, Zonaro, G.	(5)	5.0 km	MPC · JPL
12778	1994 VJ_{1}	—	November 4, 1994	Ōizumi	T. Kobayashi	PAD	6.6 km	MPC · JPL
12779	1994 YA_{1}	—	December 28, 1994	Ōizumi	T. Kobayashi	·	9.7 km	MPC · JPL
12780 Salamony	1995 CE_{1}	Salamony	February 9, 1995	Sudbury	D. di Cicco	·	9.5 km	MPC · JPL
12781	1995 EA_{8}	—	March 12, 1995	Ondřejov	L. Kotková	·	6.7 km	MPC · JPL
12782 Mauersberger	1995 ED_{9}	Mauersberger	March 5, 1995	Tautenburg Observatory	F. Börngen	(1298)	14 km	MPC · JPL
12783	1995 GV	—	April 7, 1995	Ōizumi	T. Kobayashi	·	3.8 km	MPC · JPL
12784	1995 QE_{3}	—	August 31, 1995	Ōizumi	T. Kobayashi	NYS	4.5 km	MPC · JPL
12785	1995 ST	—	September 19, 1995	Church Stretton	S. P. Laurie	·	2.8 km	MPC · JPL
12786	1995 SU	—	September 19, 1995	Church Stretton	S. P. Laurie	·	4.0 km	MPC · JPL
12787 Abetadashi	1995 SR_{3}	Abetadashi	September 20, 1995	Kitami	K. Endate, K. Watanabe	·	3.9 km	MPC · JPL
12788 Shigeno	1995 SZ_{3}	Shigeno	September 22, 1995	Nanyo	T. Okuni	·	5.7 km	MPC · JPL
12789 Salvadoraguirre	1995 TX	Salvadoraguirre	October 14, 1995	Kitt Peak	C. W. Hergenrother	PHO	5.4 km	MPC · JPL
12790 Cernan	1995 UT_{2}	Cernan	October 24, 1995	Kleť	Kleť	·	4.9 km	MPC · JPL
12791	1995 UN_{4}	—	October 20, 1995	Ōizumi	T. Kobayashi	·	3.5 km	MPC · JPL
12792	1995 UL_{6}	—	October 27, 1995	Ōizumi	T. Kobayashi	NYS ·	5.6 km	MPC · JPL
12793 Hosinokokai	1995 UP_{8}	Hosinokokai	October 30, 1995	Nanyo	T. Okuni	·	3.4 km	MPC · JPL
12794	1995 VL	—	November 2, 1995	Ōizumi	T. Kobayashi	·	3.6 km	MPC · JPL
12795	1995 VA_{2}	—	November 11, 1995	Xinglong	SCAP	·	8.7 km	MPC · JPL
12796 Kamenrider	1995 WF	Kamenrider	November 16, 1995	Kuma Kogen	A. Nakamura	·	5.1 km	MPC · JPL
12797	1995 WL_{4}	—	November 20, 1995	Ōizumi	T. Kobayashi	NYS	5.7 km	MPC · JPL
12798	1995 WZ_{4}	—	November 24, 1995	Ōizumi	T. Kobayashi	NYS	3.1 km	MPC · JPL
12799 von Suttner	1995 WF_{6}	von Suttner	November 26, 1995	Kleť	Kleť	·	5.7 km	MPC · JPL
12800 Oobayashiarata	1995 WQ_{7}	Oobayashiarata	November 27, 1995	Ōizumi	T. Kobayashi	MAS	3.8 km	MPC · JPL

== 12801–12900 ==
back to top

Designation			Discovery			Properties		Ref
Permanent	Provisional	Named after	Date	Site	Discoverer(s)	Category	Diam.	Ref
12801 Somekawa	1995 XD	Somekawa	December 2, 1995	Ōizumi	T. Kobayashi	V	2.7 km	MPC · JPL
12802 Hagino	1995 XD_{1}	Hagino	December 15, 1995	Ōizumi	T. Kobayashi	NYS	4.0 km	MPC · JPL
12803	1995 YF	—	December 17, 1995	Ōizumi	T. Kobayashi	NYS	5.7 km	MPC · JPL
12804	1995 YJ_{3}	—	December 27, 1995	Ōizumi	T. Kobayashi	(5)	3.9 km	MPC · JPL
12805	1995 YL_{23}	—	December 21, 1995	Haleakalā	NEAT	·	5.7 km	MPC · JPL
12806	1996 AN	—	January 11, 1996	Ōizumi	T. Kobayashi	NYS	5.4 km	MPC · JPL
12807	1996 AW	—	January 11, 1996	Ōizumi	T. Kobayashi	·	3.8 km	MPC · JPL
12808	1996 AF_{1}	—	January 12, 1996	Ōizumi	T. Kobayashi	slow	6.0 km	MPC · JPL
12809	1996 BB	—	January 16, 1996	Ōizumi	T. Kobayashi	GEF	7.8 km	MPC · JPL
12810 Okumiomote	1996 BV	Okumiomote	January 17, 1996	Kitami	K. Endate, K. Watanabe	·	4.1 km	MPC · JPL
12811 Rigonistern	1996 CL_{7}	Rigonistern	February 14, 1996	Cima Ekar	U. Munari, M. Tombelli	·	2.7 km	MPC · JPL
12812 Cioni	1996 CN_{7}	Cioni	February 14, 1996	Cima Ekar	M. Tombelli, U. Munari	·	6.7 km	MPC · JPL
12813 Paolapaolini	1996 CU_{8}	Paolapaolini	February 14, 1996	Cima Ekar	M. Tombelli, U. Munari	GEF	5.0 km	MPC · JPL
12814 Vittorio	1996 CG_{9}	Vittorio	February 13, 1996	Cima Ekar	M. Tombelli, U. Munari	V	4.2 km	MPC · JPL
12815	1996 DL_{2}	—	February 23, 1996	Ōizumi	T. Kobayashi	KOR	4.7 km	MPC · JPL
12816	1996 ES_{1}	—	March 15, 1996	Haleakalā	NEAT	·	10 km	MPC · JPL
12817 Federica	1996 FM_{16}	Federica	March 22, 1996	La Silla	E. W. Elst	·	9.3 km	MPC · JPL
12818 Tomhanks	1996 GU_{8}	Tomhanks	April 13, 1996	Kitt Peak	Spacewatch	·	5.4 km	MPC · JPL
12819 Susumutakahasi	1996 JO	Susumutakahasi	May 12, 1996	Moriyama	R. H. McNaught, Ikari, Y.	·	10 km	MPC · JPL
12820 Robinwilliams	1996 JN_{6}	Robinwilliams	May 11, 1996	Kitt Peak	Spacewatch	·	6.4 km	MPC · JPL
12821	1996 RG_{1}	—	September 10, 1996	Xinglong	SCAP	·	3.2 km	MPC · JPL
12822	1996 XD_{1}	—	December 2, 1996	Ōizumi	T. Kobayashi	·	3.2 km	MPC · JPL
12823 Pochintesta	1997 AP	Pochintesta	January 2, 1997	Ōizumi	T. Kobayashi	·	3.2 km	MPC · JPL
12824	1997 AW_{3}	—	January 6, 1997	Ōizumi	T. Kobayashi	·	3.5 km	MPC · JPL
12825	1997 AJ_{7}	—	January 9, 1997	Ōizumi	T. Kobayashi	NYS	2.9 km	MPC · JPL
12826	1997 AO_{7}	—	January 9, 1997	Ōizumi	T. Kobayashi	·	3.6 km	MPC · JPL
12827	1997 AS_{7}	—	January 5, 1997	Xinglong	SCAP	V	3.4 km	MPC · JPL
12828 Batteas	1997 AU_{9}	Batteas	January 3, 1997	Kitt Peak	Spacewatch	·	3.0 km	MPC · JPL
12829	1997 AB_{13}	—	January 10, 1997	Ōizumi	T. Kobayashi	·	3.1 km	MPC · JPL
12830	1997 BP_{1}	—	January 29, 1997	Ōizumi	T. Kobayashi	·	3.6 km	MPC · JPL
12831	1997 BS_{6}	—	January 29, 1997	Nachi-Katsuura	Y. Shimizu, T. Urata	·	3.2 km	MPC · JPL
12832	1997 CE_{1}	—	February 1, 1997	Ōizumi	T. Kobayashi	·	6.0 km	MPC · JPL
12833 Kamenný Újezd	1997 CV_{1}	Kamenný Újezd	February 2, 1997	Kleť	J. Tichá, M. Tichý	·	2.6 km	MPC · JPL
12834 Bomben	1997 CB_{13}	Bomben	February 4, 1997	Kitt Peak	Spacewatch	·	3.1 km	MPC · JPL
12835 Stropek	1997 CN_{13}	Stropek	February 7, 1997	Kleť	Kleť	V	2.9 km	MPC · JPL
12836	1997 CA_{22}	—	February 13, 1997	Ōizumi	T. Kobayashi	·	3.0 km	MPC · JPL
12837	1997 EK_{35}	—	March 4, 1997	Socorro	LINEAR	(2076)	4.6 km	MPC · JPL
12838 Adamsmith	1997 EL_{55}	Adamsmith	March 9, 1997	La Silla	E. W. Elst	KOR	8.3 km	MPC · JPL
12839	1997 FB_{2}	—	March 29, 1997	Xinglong	SCAP	·	4.0 km	MPC · JPL
12840 Paolaferrari	1997 GR_{5}	Paolaferrari	April 6, 1997	San Marcello	L. Tesi, G. Cattani	·	4.5 km	MPC · JPL
12841	1997 GD_{8}	—	April 2, 1997	Socorro	LINEAR	·	3.0 km	MPC · JPL
12842	1997 GQ_{23}	—	April 6, 1997	Socorro	LINEAR	·	7.6 km	MPC · JPL
12843 Ewers	1997 GH_{27}	Ewers	April 9, 1997	Kitt Peak	Spacewatch	·	3.8 km	MPC · JPL
12844	1997 JE_{10}	—	May 9, 1997	Kashihara	F. Uto	EOS	10 km	MPC · JPL
12845 Crick	1997 JM_{15}	Crick	May 3, 1997	La Silla	E. W. Elst	·	3.3 km	MPC · JPL
12846 Fullerton	1997 MR	Fullerton	June 28, 1997	Kitt Peak	Spacewatch	·	7.0 km	MPC · JPL
12847	1997 NQ_{2}	—	July 6, 1997	Farra d'Isonzo	Farra d'Isonzo	·	13 km	MPC · JPL
12848 Agostino	1997 NK_{10}	Agostino	July 10, 1997	Campo Imperatore	A. Boattini	MAR	4.9 km	MPC · JPL
12849	1997 QD_{2}	—	August 27, 1997	Nachi-Katsuura	Y. Shimizu, T. Urata	EOS	13 km	MPC · JPL
12850 Axelmunthe	1998 CO_{3}	Axelmunthe	February 6, 1998	La Silla	E. W. Elst	·	4.3 km	MPC · JPL
12851	1998 DT_{9}	—	February 22, 1998	Haleakalā	NEAT	·	2.2 km	MPC · JPL
12852 Teply	1998 FW_{30}	Teply	March 20, 1998	Socorro	LINEAR	·	3.5 km	MPC · JPL
12853	1998 FZ_{97}	—	March 31, 1998	Socorro	LINEAR	·	5.2 km	MPC · JPL
12854	1998 HA_{13}	—	April 29, 1998	Haleakalā	NEAT	·	4.1 km	MPC · JPL
12855 Tewksbury	1998 HS_{32}	Tewksbury	April 20, 1998	Socorro	LINEAR	·	3.6 km	MPC · JPL
12856 Autridas	1998 HH_{93}	Autridas	April 21, 1998	Socorro	LINEAR	·	4.7 km	MPC · JPL
12857 Johandemessie	1998 HQ_{97}	Johandemessie	April 21, 1998	Socorro	LINEAR	KOR	6.3 km	MPC · JPL
12858	1998 JD_{2}	—	May 1, 1998	Haleakalā	NEAT	·	2.8 km	MPC · JPL
12859 Marlamoore	1998 KK_{1}	Marlamoore	May 18, 1998	Anderson Mesa	LONEOS	·	3.2 km	MPC · JPL
12860 Turney	1998 KT_{32}	Turney	May 22, 1998	Socorro	LINEAR	slow?	3.1 km	MPC · JPL
12861 Wacker	1998 KW_{33}	Wacker	May 22, 1998	Socorro	LINEAR	·	4.0 km	MPC · JPL
12862	1998 KV_{37}	—	May 22, 1998	Socorro	LINEAR	·	2.6 km	MPC · JPL
12863 Whitfield	1998 KE_{48}	Whitfield	May 22, 1998	Socorro	LINEAR	·	3.4 km	MPC · JPL
12864 Ryandrake	1998 KB_{55}	Ryandrake	May 23, 1998	Socorro	LINEAR	·	7.9 km	MPC · JPL
12865	1998 KL_{55}	—	May 23, 1998	Socorro	LINEAR	EOS	8.0 km	MPC · JPL
12866 Yanamadala	1998 KL_{65}	Yanamadala	May 22, 1998	Socorro	LINEAR	NYS	2.6 km	MPC · JPL
12867 Joëloïc	1998 LK_{2}	Joëloïc	June 1, 1998	La Silla	E. W. Elst	slow	6.1 km	MPC · JPL
12868 Onken	1998 MZ_{7}	Onken	June 19, 1998	Anderson Mesa	LONEOS	slow	10 km	MPC · JPL
12869 Ejiaga	1998 MR_{32}	Ejiaga	June 24, 1998	Socorro	LINEAR	KOR	5.3 km	MPC · JPL
12870 Rolandmeier	1998 MK_{37}	Rolandmeier	June 24, 1998	Anderson Mesa	LONEOS	RAF	4.9 km	MPC · JPL
12871 Samarasinha	1998 ML_{37}	Samarasinha	June 24, 1998	Anderson Mesa	LONEOS	·	3.6 km	MPC · JPL
12872 Susiestevens	1998 OZ_{5}	Susiestevens	July 21, 1998	Socorro	LINEAR	·	3.0 km	MPC · JPL
12873 Clausewitz	1998 OU_{7}	Clausewitz	July 26, 1998	La Silla	E. W. Elst	·	4.9 km	MPC · JPL
12874 Poisson	1998 QZ	Poisson	August 19, 1998	Prescott	P. G. Comba	·	5.4 km	MPC · JPL
12875	1998 QA_{2}	—	August 19, 1998	Haleakalā	NEAT	·	6.0 km	MPC · JPL
12876 Estrada	1998 QR_{10}	Estrada	August 17, 1998	Socorro	LINEAR	KOR	5.7 km	MPC · JPL
12877 Rylangardner	1998 QF_{11}	Rylangardner	August 17, 1998	Socorro	LINEAR	PHO	7.8 km	MPC · JPL
12878 Erneschiller	1998 QH_{11}	Erneschiller	August 17, 1998	Socorro	LINEAR	·	4.3 km	MPC · JPL
12879	1998 QN_{18}	—	August 17, 1998	Socorro	LINEAR	EOS	7.2 km	MPC · JPL
12880 Juliegrady	1998 QM_{25}	Juliegrady	August 17, 1998	Socorro	LINEAR	·	3.3 km	MPC · JPL
12881 Yepeiyu	1998 QF_{31}	Yepeiyu	August 17, 1998	Socorro	LINEAR	·	5.9 km	MPC · JPL
12882	1998 QS_{31}	—	August 17, 1998	Socorro	LINEAR	·	18 km	MPC · JPL
12883 Gassler	1998 QY_{32}	Gassler	August 17, 1998	Socorro	LINEAR	·	3.9 km	MPC · JPL
12884	1998 QL_{34}	—	August 17, 1998	Socorro	LINEAR	THM	13 km	MPC · JPL
12885 Hannahguan	1998 QM_{34}	Hannahguan	August 17, 1998	Socorro	LINEAR	·	8.0 km	MPC · JPL
12886	1998 QG_{35}	—	August 17, 1998	Socorro	LINEAR	GEF	6.9 km	MPC · JPL
12887	1998 QP_{35}	—	August 17, 1998	Socorro	LINEAR	THM	10 km	MPC · JPL
12888	1998 QR_{42}	—	August 17, 1998	Socorro	LINEAR	·	17 km	MPC · JPL
12889	1998 QW_{42}	—	August 17, 1998	Socorro	LINEAR	THM	10 km	MPC · JPL
12890	1998 QG_{43}	—	August 17, 1998	Socorro	LINEAR	·	10 km	MPC · JPL
12891 Kassandraholt	1998 QH_{51}	Kassandraholt	August 17, 1998	Socorro	LINEAR	AGN	5.2 km	MPC · JPL
12892	1998 QE_{52}	—	August 17, 1998	Socorro	LINEAR	·	5.9 km	MPC · JPL
12893 Mommert	1998 QS_{55}	Mommert	August 26, 1998	Caussols	ODAS	·	5.2 km	MPC · JPL
12894	1998 QN_{73}	—	August 24, 1998	Socorro	LINEAR	ADE · slow	12 km	MPC · JPL
12895 Balbastre	1998 QO_{99}	Balbastre	August 26, 1998	La Silla	E. W. Elst	·	3.1 km	MPC · JPL
12896 Geoffroy	1998 QV_{102}	Geoffroy	August 26, 1998	La Silla	E. W. Elst	T_{j} (2.98) · 3:2	14 km	MPC · JPL
12897 Bougeret	1998 RY_{5}	Bougeret	September 13, 1998	Anderson Mesa	LONEOS	·	3.4 km	MPC · JPL
12898 Mignard	1998 RK_{6}	Mignard	September 14, 1998	Anderson Mesa	LONEOS	·	9.5 km	MPC · JPL
12899	1998 RN_{13}	—	September 1, 1998	Woomera	F. B. Zoltowski	NYS	5.5 km	MPC · JPL
12900 Rishabjain	1998 RP_{28}	Rishabjain	September 14, 1998	Socorro	LINEAR	·	8.0 km	MPC · JPL

== 12901–13000 ==
back to top

Designation			Discovery			Properties		Ref
Permanent	Provisional	Named after	Date	Site	Discoverer(s)	Category	Diam.	Ref
12901	1998 RF_{50}	—	September 14, 1998	Socorro	LINEAR	·	7.1 km	MPC · JPL
12902	1998 RW_{52}	—	September 14, 1998	Socorro	LINEAR	EOS	10 km	MPC · JPL
12903 Isabellekatz	1998 RK_{57}	Isabellekatz	September 14, 1998	Socorro	LINEAR	NYS	6.2 km	MPC · JPL
12904	1998 RB_{65}	—	September 14, 1998	Socorro	LINEAR	THM	10 km	MPC · JPL
12905	1998 RJ_{72}	—	September 14, 1998	Socorro	LINEAR	THM	11 km	MPC · JPL
12906 Alexismacavoy	1998 RS_{72}	Alexismacavoy	September 14, 1998	Socorro	LINEAR	AGN	4.9 km	MPC · JPL
12907 Giannanilvo	1998 RV_{79}	Giannanilvo	September 14, 1998	Socorro	LINEAR	·	9.7 km	MPC · JPL
12908 Yagudina	1998 SG_{25}	Yagudina	September 22, 1998	Anderson Mesa	LONEOS	EUN	7.2 km	MPC · JPL
12909 Jaclifford	1998 SK_{58}	Jaclifford	September 17, 1998	Anderson Mesa	LONEOS	·	4.3 km	MPC · JPL
12910 Deliso	1998 SP_{59}	Deliso	September 17, 1998	Anderson Mesa	LONEOS	·	3.2 km	MPC · JPL
12911 Goodhue	1998 SQ_{59}	Goodhue	September 17, 1998	Anderson Mesa	LONEOS	THM	15 km	MPC · JPL
12912 Streator	1998 SR_{60}	Streator	September 17, 1998	Anderson Mesa	LONEOS	THM	10 km	MPC · JPL
12913	1998 SR_{130}	—	September 26, 1998	Socorro	LINEAR	·	5.7 km	MPC · JPL
12914	1998 SJ_{141}	—	September 26, 1998	Socorro	LINEAR	EUN	9.5 km	MPC · JPL
12915 Rinoliver	1998 SL_{161}	Rinoliver	September 26, 1998	Socorro	LINEAR	·	5.6 km	MPC · JPL
12916 Eteoneus	1998 TL_{15}	Eteoneus	October 13, 1998	Caussols	ODAS	L4	22 km	MPC · JPL
12917	1998 TG_{16}	—	October 13, 1998	Višnjan Observatory	K. Korlević	L4	25 km	MPC · JPL
12918	1998 UF_{21}	—	October 29, 1998	Višnjan Observatory	K. Korlević	EOS	14 km	MPC · JPL
12919 Tomjohnson	1998 VB_{6}	Tomjohnson	November 11, 1998	Catalina	CSS	·	4.9 km	MPC · JPL
12920	1998 VM_{15}	—	November 10, 1998	Socorro	LINEAR	3:2	40 km	MPC · JPL
12921	1998 WZ_{5}	—	November 20, 1998	Nachi-Katsuura	Y. Shimizu, T. Urata	L4	32 km	MPC · JPL
12922	1998 WW_{19}	—	November 27, 1998	Woomera	F. B. Zoltowski	·	16 km	MPC · JPL
12923 Zephyr	1999 GK_{4}	Zephyr	April 11, 1999	Anderson Mesa	LONEOS	APO +1km · PHA	2.1 km	MPC · JPL
12924 Madisonicole	1999 RK_{21}	Madisonicole	September 7, 1999	Socorro	LINEAR	·	2.4 km	MPC · JPL
12925	1999 SN_{4}	—	September 29, 1999	Višnjan Observatory	Višnjan	·	3.9 km	MPC · JPL
12926 Brianmason	1999 SO_{9}	Brianmason	September 27, 1999	Takapuna	Schiff, J. L., Schiff, C. J.	·	10 km	MPC · JPL
12927 Pinocchio	1999 SU_{9}	Pinocchio	September 30, 1999	San Marcello	M. Tombelli, L. Tesi	·	2.0 km	MPC · JPL
12928 Nicolapozio	1999 SV_{9}	Nicolapozio	September 30, 1999	San Marcello	A. Boattini, G. Forti	·	5.4 km	MPC · JPL
12929 Periboea	1999 TZ_{1}	Periboea	October 2, 1999	Fountain Hills	C. W. Juels	L5	54 km	MPC · JPL
12930	1999 TJ_{6}	—	October 2, 1999	Višnjan Observatory	K. Korlević, M. Jurić	THM	9.1 km	MPC · JPL
12931 Mario	1999 TX_{10}	Mario	October 7, 1999	Gnosca	S. Sposetti	·	4.6 km	MPC · JPL
12932 Conedera	1999 TC_{12}	Conedera	October 10, 1999	Gnosca	S. Sposetti	NYS	3.0 km	MPC · JPL
12933 Muzzonigro	1999 TC_{16}	Muzzonigro	October 14, 1999	Farra d'Isonzo	Farra d'Isonzo	·	2.3 km	MPC · JPL
12934 Bisque	1999 TH_{16}	Bisque	October 11, 1999	Fountain Hills	C. W. Juels	·	4.4 km	MPC · JPL
12935 Zhengzhemin	1999 TV_{17}	Zhengzhemin	October 2, 1999	Xinglong	SCAP	·	5.6 km	MPC · JPL
12936 Glennschneider	2549 P-L	Glennschneider	September 24, 1960	Palomar	C. J. van Houten, I. van Houten-Groeneveld, T. Gehrels	KOR	5.1 km	MPC · JPL
12937 Premadi	3024 P-L	Premadi	September 24, 1960	Palomar	C. J. van Houten, I. van Houten-Groeneveld, T. Gehrels	·	11 km	MPC · JPL
12938 Ingakamp	4161 P-L	Ingakamp	September 24, 1960	Palomar	C. J. van Houten, I. van Houten-Groeneveld, T. Gehrels	·	5.8 km	MPC · JPL
12939 Ignassnellen	4206 P-L	Ignassnellen	September 24, 1960	Palomar	C. J. van Houten, I. van Houten-Groeneveld, T. Gehrels	·	3.7 km	MPC · JPL
12940 Gijsnelemans	4588 P-L	Gijsnelemans	September 24, 1960	Palomar	C. J. van Houten, I. van Houten-Groeneveld, T. Gehrels	·	2.7 km	MPC · JPL
12941 Franssnik	4638 P-L	Franssnik	September 24, 1960	Palomar	C. J. van Houten, I. van Houten-Groeneveld, T. Gehrels	·	3.5 km	MPC · JPL
12942 van der Marel	6054 P-L	van der Marel	September 24, 1960	Palomar	C. J. van Houten, I. van Houten-Groeneveld, T. Gehrels	·	6.7 km	MPC · JPL
12943 Selmademink	6670 P-L	Selmademink	September 24, 1960	Palomar	C. J. van Houten, I. van Houten-Groeneveld, T. Gehrels	·	7.7 km	MPC · JPL
12944 Robwalrecht	6745 P-L	Robwalrecht	September 24, 1960	Palomar	C. J. van Houten, I. van Houten-Groeneveld, T. Gehrels	THM	6.6 km	MPC · JPL
12945 Reynierpeletier	9534 P-L	Reynierpeletier	October 17, 1960	Palomar	C. J. van Houten, I. van Houten-Groeneveld, T. Gehrels	·	7.1 km	MPC · JPL
12946 Portegieszwart	1290 T-1	Portegieszwart	March 25, 1971	Palomar	C. J. van Houten, I. van Houten-Groeneveld, T. Gehrels	V · fast	2.3 km	MPC · JPL
12947 Paulgroot	3099 T-1	Paulgroot	March 26, 1971	Palomar	C. J. van Houten, I. van Houten-Groeneveld, T. Gehrels	·	3.5 km	MPC · JPL
12948 Nathaliedegenaar	4273 T-1	Nathaliedegenaar	March 26, 1971	Palomar	C. J. van Houten, I. van Houten-Groeneveld, T. Gehrels	·	5.4 km	MPC · JPL
12949 Milogrootjen	4290 T-1	Milogrootjen	March 26, 1971	Palomar	C. J. van Houten, I. van Houten-Groeneveld, T. Gehrels	CYB	18 km	MPC · JPL
12950 Michielrodenhuis	4321 T-1	Michielrodenhuis	March 26, 1971	Palomar	C. J. van Houten, I. van Houten-Groeneveld, T. Gehrels	·	7.3 km	MPC · JPL
12951 Koenkuijken	1041 T-2	Koenkuijken	September 29, 1973	Palomar	C. J. van Houten, I. van Houten-Groeneveld, T. Gehrels	KOR	5.8 km	MPC · JPL
12952 Joerivanleeuwen	1102 T-2	Joerivanleeuwen	September 29, 1973	Palomar	C. J. van Houten, I. van Houten-Groeneveld, T. Gehrels	KOR	3.7 km	MPC · JPL
12953 Jaapvreeling	1264 T-2	Jaapvreeling	September 29, 1973	Palomar	C. J. van Houten, I. van Houten-Groeneveld, T. Gehrels	·	3.3 km	MPC · JPL
12954 Hendrikcasimir	2040 T-2	Hendrikcasimir	September 29, 1973	Palomar	C. J. van Houten, I. van Houten-Groeneveld, T. Gehrels	·	4.4 km	MPC · JPL
12955 Alexdekoter	2162 T-2	Alexdekoter	September 29, 1973	Palomar	C. J. van Houten, I. van Houten-Groeneveld, T. Gehrels	·	2.3 km	MPC · JPL
12956 Ralphwijers	2232 T-2	Ralphwijers	September 29, 1973	Palomar	C. J. van Houten, I. van Houten-Groeneveld, T. Gehrels	·	4.0 km	MPC · JPL
12957	2258 T-2	—	September 29, 1973	Palomar	C. J. van Houten, I. van Houten-Groeneveld, T. Gehrels	·	3.6 km	MPC · JPL
12958	2276 T-2	—	September 29, 1973	Palomar	C. J. van Houten, I. van Houten-Groeneveld, T. Gehrels	·	2.5 km	MPC · JPL
12959	3086 T-2	—	September 30, 1973	Palomar	C. J. van Houten, I. van Houten-Groeneveld, T. Gehrels	·	3.6 km	MPC · JPL
12960	4165 T-2	—	September 29, 1973	Palomar	C. J. van Houten, I. van Houten-Groeneveld, T. Gehrels	(5)	4.5 km	MPC · JPL
12961	4262 T-2	—	September 29, 1973	Palomar	C. J. van Houten, I. van Houten-Groeneveld, T. Gehrels	·	2.0 km	MPC · JPL
12962	4297 T-2	—	September 29, 1973	Palomar	C. J. van Houten, I. van Houten-Groeneveld, T. Gehrels	CYB	9.3 km	MPC · JPL
12963	5485 T-2	—	September 30, 1973	Palomar	C. J. van Houten, I. van Houten-Groeneveld, T. Gehrels	V	3.9 km	MPC · JPL
12964	1071 T-3	—	October 17, 1977	Palomar	C. J. van Houten, I. van Houten-Groeneveld, T. Gehrels	V	3.4 km	MPC · JPL
12965	1080 T-3	—	October 17, 1977	Palomar	C. J. van Houten, I. van Houten-Groeneveld, T. Gehrels	·	5.8 km	MPC · JPL
12966	1102 T-3	—	October 17, 1977	Palomar	C. J. van Houten, I. van Houten-Groeneveld, T. Gehrels	·	11 km	MPC · JPL
12967	3105 T-3	—	October 16, 1977	Palomar	C. J. van Houten, I. van Houten-Groeneveld, T. Gehrels	NYS ·	6.1 km	MPC · JPL
12968	3261 T-3	—	October 16, 1977	Palomar	C. J. van Houten, I. van Houten-Groeneveld, T. Gehrels	·	8.3 km	MPC · JPL
12969	3482 T-3	—	October 16, 1977	Palomar	C. J. van Houten, I. van Houten-Groeneveld, T. Gehrels	THM	4.8 km	MPC · JPL
12970	4012 T-3	—	October 16, 1977	Palomar	C. J. van Houten, I. van Houten-Groeneveld, T. Gehrels	EOS	7.5 km	MPC · JPL
12971	4054 T-3	—	October 16, 1977	Palomar	C. J. van Houten, I. van Houten-Groeneveld, T. Gehrels	EOS	7.3 km	MPC · JPL
12972 Eumaios	1973 SF_{1}	Eumaios	September 19, 1973	Palomar	C. J. van Houten, I. van Houten-Groeneveld, T. Gehrels	L4	23 km	MPC · JPL
12973 Melanthios	1973 SY_{1}	Melanthios	September 19, 1973	Palomar	C. J. van Houten, I. van Houten-Groeneveld, T. Gehrels	L4	30 km	MPC · JPL
12974 Halitherses	1973 SB_{2}	Halitherses	September 19, 1973	Palomar	C. J. van Houten, I. van Houten-Groeneveld, T. Gehrels	L4	25 km	MPC · JPL
12975 Efremov	1973 SY_{5}	Efremov	September 28, 1973	Nauchnij	N. S. Chernykh	MAR	6.7 km	MPC · JPL
12976 Kalinenkov	1976 QK_{1}	Kalinenkov	August 26, 1976	Nauchnij	N. S. Chernykh	·	5.6 km	MPC · JPL
12977 Nanettevigil	1978 NC	Nanettevigil	July 10, 1978	Palomar	E. F. Helin, E. M. Shoemaker	·	6.0 km	MPC · JPL
12978 Ivashov	1978 SD_{7}	Ivashov	September 26, 1978	Nauchnij	L. V. Zhuravleva	·	3.1 km	MPC · JPL
12979 Evgalvasilʹev	1978 SB_{8}	Evgalvasilʹev	September 26, 1978	Nauchnij	L. V. Zhuravleva	·	2.9 km	MPC · JPL
12980 Pruetz	1978 VO_{3}	Pruetz	November 6, 1978	Palomar	E. F. Helin, S. J. Bus	NYS	2.3 km	MPC · JPL
12981 Tracicase	1978 VP_{3}	Tracicase	November 7, 1978	Palomar	E. F. Helin, S. J. Bus	·	5.6 km	MPC · JPL
12982 Kaseybond	1979 MS_{5}	Kaseybond	June 25, 1979	Siding Spring	E. F. Helin, S. J. Bus	slow	4.1 km	MPC · JPL
12983 Mattcox	1979 OH_{1}	Mattcox	July 24, 1979	Palomar	S. J. Bus	·	16 km	MPC · JPL
12984 Lowry	1979 QF_{2}	Lowry	August 22, 1979	La Silla	C.-I. Lagerkvist	KOR	4.8 km	MPC · JPL
12985 Mattgarrison	1980 UW_{1}	Mattgarrison	October 31, 1980	Palomar	S. J. Bus	NYS	4.3 km	MPC · JPL
12986 Kretke	1981 DM_{2}	Kretke	February 28, 1981	Siding Spring	S. J. Bus	TRE	7.8 km	MPC · JPL
12987 Racalmuto	1981 EF_{2}	Racalmuto	March 5, 1981	La Silla	H. Debehogne, G. de Sanctis	·	7.6 km	MPC · JPL
12988 Tiffanykapler	1981 EC_{5}	Tiffanykapler	March 2, 1981	Siding Spring	S. J. Bus	·	2.0 km	MPC · JPL
12989 Chriseanderson	1981 EV_{9}	Chriseanderson	March 1, 1981	Siding Spring	S. J. Bus	(254)	1.5 km	MPC · JPL
12990 Josetillard	1981 EB_{17}	Josetillard	March 6, 1981	Siding Spring	S. J. Bus	·	3.9 km	MPC · JPL
12991 Davidgriffiths	1981 EN_{21}	Davidgriffiths	March 2, 1981	Siding Spring	S. J. Bus	KOR	3.7 km	MPC · JPL
12992 Crumpler	1981 EZ_{22}	Crumpler	March 2, 1981	Siding Spring	S. J. Bus	·	2.4 km	MPC · JPL
12993 Luisafernanda	1981 EP_{27}	Luisafernanda	March 2, 1981	Siding Spring	S. J. Bus	·	6.1 km	MPC · JPL
12994 Pitufo	1981 ET_{27}	Pitufo	March 2, 1981	Siding Spring	S. J. Bus	KOR	4.1 km	MPC · JPL
12995 Wendellmendell	1981 EY_{27}	Wendellmendell	March 2, 1981	Siding Spring	S. J. Bus	·	4.7 km	MPC · JPL
12996 Claudedomingue	1981 EV_{28}	Claudedomingue	March 1, 1981	Siding Spring	S. J. Bus	·	5.6 km	MPC · JPL
12997 Lizjensen	1981 EV_{29}	Lizjensen	March 2, 1981	Siding Spring	S. J. Bus	·	3.3 km	MPC · JPL
12998 Thomas-Keprta	1981 EB_{43}	Thomas-Keprta	March 2, 1981	Siding Spring	S. J. Bus	·	2.5 km	MPC · JPL
12999 Toruń	1981 QJ_{2}	Toruń	August 30, 1981	Anderson Mesa	E. Bowell	(2076)	3.5 km	MPC · JPL
13000	1981 QK_{3}	—	August 25, 1981	La Silla	H. Debehogne	slow	9.8 km	MPC · JPL

back to top

== See also ==
- Meanings of minor-planet names: 12001–13000
