= The Star (Clarke short story) =

1955 short story by Arthur C. Clarke

- Short story by Arthur C. Clarke
- Illustrator: John Giunta
- Country: United Kingdom
- Language: English
- Genre: Science fiction short story

Publication
- Published in: Infinity Science Fiction
- Publication type: Periodical
- Publisher: Royal Publications
- Media type: Print (Magazine)
- Publication date: November 1955
- Pages: 8
- Award: Hugo Award for Best Short Story (1956)

"The Star" is a science fiction short story by English writer Arthur C. Clarke. It appeared in the science fiction magazine Infinity Science Fiction in 1955 and won the Hugo Award in 1956. It is collected in Clarke's 1958 book of short stories The Other Side of the Sky, and it was reprinted in the January 1965 issue of Short Story International as the lead-off story.

== Plot summary ==
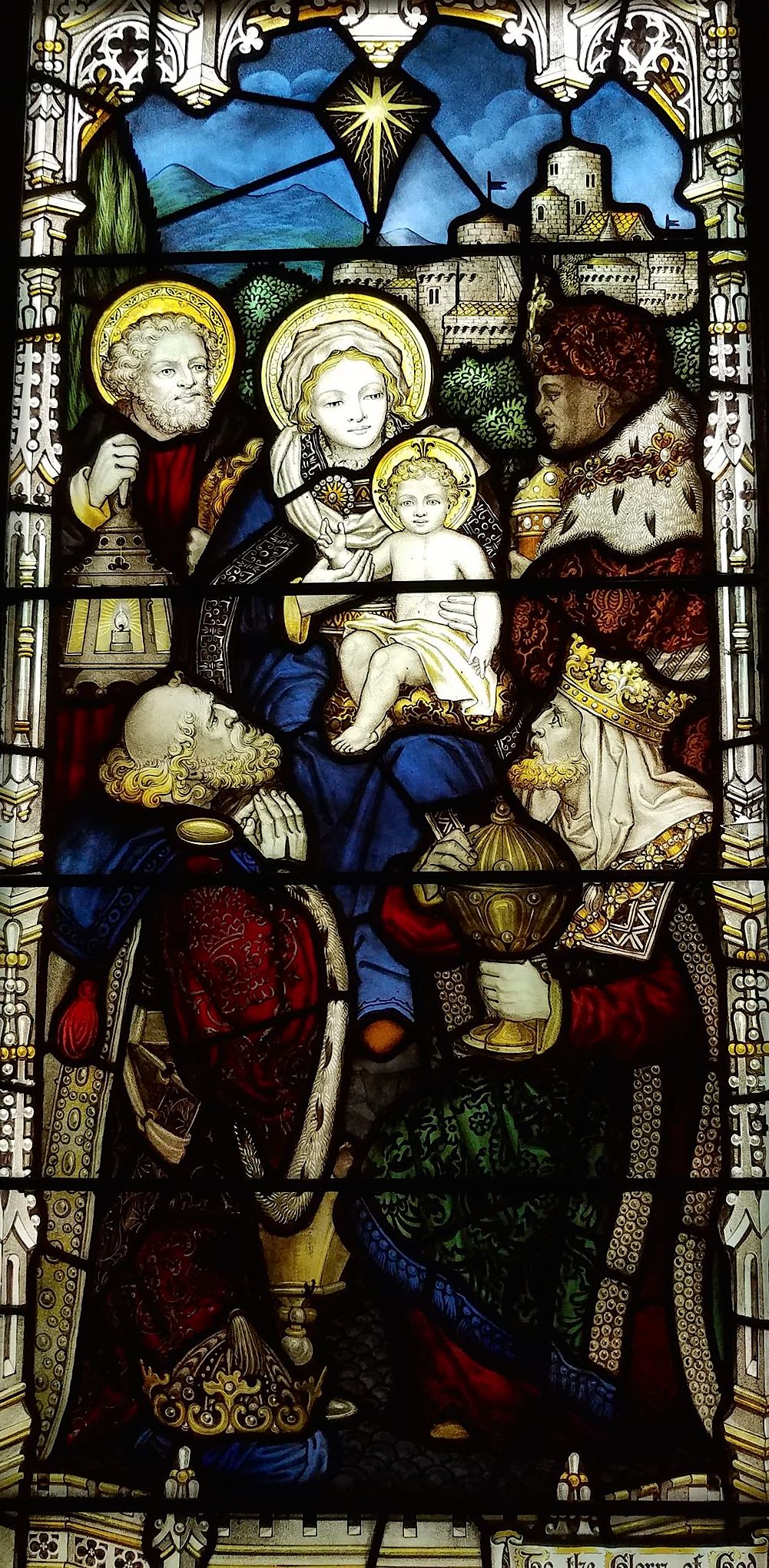
The story utilizes the theory of the star of Bethlehem being a supernova.

A group of space explorers from Earth return from an expedition to a remote star system, where they discovered the remnants of an advanced civilization destroyed when its star went supernova. The group's chief astrophysicist, a Jesuit priest, is suffering from a deep crisis of faith, triggered by some undisclosed event during the journey.

The destroyed planet's culture was very similar to Earth's. Recognizing several generations in advance that their star would soon explode, and with no means of interstellar travel to save themselves, the doomed people spent their final years building a vault on the outermost planet in their solar system, whose Pluto-like orbit was distant enough to survive the supernova. In the vault, they placed a complete record of their history, culture, achievements, and philosophy, hoping that it would someday be found so that their existence would not have been in vain. The Earth explorers, particularly the astrophysicist-priest, were deeply moved by these artifacts, and they found themselves identifying closely with the dead race's peaceful, human-like culture and the profound grace they exhibited in the face of their cruel fate.

The final paragraph of "The Star" reveals the deepest root of the priest's pain. Determining the exact year of the long-ago supernova and the star system's distance from Earth, he calculated the date the emitted light from the explosion reached Earth, showing that the cataclysm that destroyed the peaceful planet was the same star that heralded the birth of Jesus. The scientist's faith is shaken because of the apparent capriciousness of God:

[O]h God, there were so many stars you could have used. What was the need to give these people to the fire, that the symbol of their passing might shine above Bethlehem?

== Adaptations ==
The story was later dramatized as part of a Christmas episode of The Twilight Zone in 1985. Although the original story ends on a negative note, this version has a more upbeat ending: a crewmate reads the priest a poem left by the people of the doomed planet which ends with "grieve for those who go alone, unwise, to die in darkness, and never see the sun." Arthur C. Clarke was consulted about the changed ending and did not contact the studio with any objections. The episode's screenwriter, Alan Brennert, later commented that "Over the years I've taken a little bit of heat from certain fans in the science fiction community for changing the ending of this story. I actually maintain that the ending as it is in this episode is implicit in the story and is not really at odds with the kind of metaphysical work that Clarke did in Childhood's End."

== Related works ==
- "Rebuttal" by Betsy Curtis, published in the June 1956 issue of Infinity, is a sequel and response to "The Star", with a doctor who is also a priest speaking with the original story's narrator after his return to Earth.
- James Blish's A Case of Conscience also has a Jesuit priest confronting an alien civilization.
- Mary Doria Russell's The Sparrow and sequel Children of God feature a Jesuit linguist/priest who has a crisis of faith confronting alien cultures.
- Stanisław Lem's Fiasco is also about a first contact/SETI mission and has a Dominican friar as one of the prominent secondary characters.
- Larry Niven's Draco Tavern short story "The Subject Is Closed" has a priest confronting an alien about life after death. The alien describes another species that committed mass suicide when it discovered the secret.
- Calculating God by Robert J. Sawyer, another work which deals with the intersection of religion and science and features a supernova. Sawyer cited "The Star" as a major influence on his work.
- Doctor Who's 2024 Christmas Special on BBC, "Joy to the World", ends with a similar theme.

== See also ==
- GRB 080319B, one of five gamma ray bursts detected by the Swift Gamma-Ray Burst Mission satellite within the 24-hour period around Clarke's own death.
