= 12374 Rakhat =

Background asteroid from the central region of the asteroid belt

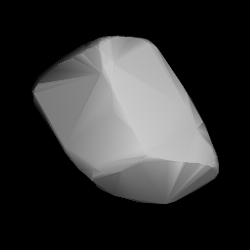
- Shape model of Rakhat from its lightcurve

Discovery
- Discovered by: C. P. de Saint-Aignan
- Discovery site: Palomar Obs.
- Discovery date: 15 May 1994

Designations
- Named after: fictional planet (novel The Sparrow)
- Alternative designations: 1994 JG_{9} · 1958 TP; 1974 OP · 1978 NV_{2}
- Minor planet category: main-belt · (middle) background

Orbital characteristics
- Epoch 4 September 2017 (JD 2458000.5)
- Uncertainty parameter 0
- Observation arc: 62.27 yr (22,743 days)
- Aphelion: 3.3333 AU
- Perihelion: 1.7672 AU
- Semi-major axis: 2.5502 AU
- Eccentricity: 0.3071
- Orbital period (sidereal): 4.07 yr (1,488 days)
- Mean anomaly: 197.25°
- Mean motion: 0° 14^{m} 31.2^{s} / day
- Inclination: 8.9855°
- Longitude of ascending node: 123.46°
- Argument of perihelion: 201.94°

Physical characteristics
- Mean diameter: 4.38 km (calculated); 4.570±0.034 km
- Synodic rotation period: 18.1702±0.0205 h
- Geometric albedo: 0.20 (assumed); 0.212±0.030
- Spectral type: S (assumed)
- Absolute magnitude (H): 13.707±0.005 (R) · 13.8 · 14.0 · 14.16 · 14.60±0.76

12374 Rakhat (prov. designation: 1994 JG_{9}) is a background asteroid from the central region of the asteroid belt, approximately 4.5 kilometers (2.8 miles) in diameter. It was discovered on 15 May 1994, by American astronomer and software engineer Charles de Saint-Aignan at the Palomar Observatory in California, United States. The asteroid was named for the fictional planet "Rakhat" in the novel The Sparrow

== Orbit and classification ==
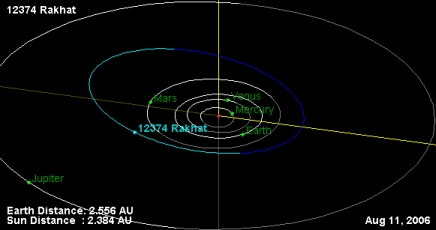
Orbital diagram of Rakhat

Rakhat is a non-family asteroid from the main belt's background population. It orbits the Sun in the central main-belt at a distance of 1.8–3.3 AU once every 4 years and 1 month (1,488 days). Its orbit has an eccentricity of 0.31 and an inclination of 9° with respect to the ecliptic.

A first precovery was taken at the discovering Palomar Observatory in November 1954, extending the asteroid's observation arc by 40 years prior to its official discovery observation.

== Naming ==
This minor planet was named "Rakhat" after the fictional planet in the novel The Sparrow by Mary Doria Russell. The novel begins in 2019, when SETI at the Arecibo, picks up radio broadcasts of music from this planet in the vicinity of Alpha Centauri. The first expedition is organized by the Jesuit order, known for its missionary, linguistic and scientific activities. The novel was followed by the sequel Children of God. The approved naming citation was published by the Minor Planet Center on 28 March 2002 (M.P.C. 45234).

== Physical characteristics ==
Rakhat is an assumed common S-type asteroid.

In May 2010, a rotational lightcurve was obtained from photometric observations made astronomers at the Palomar Transient Factory in California. It gave a rotation period of 18.1702±0.0205 hours with a brightness amplitude of 0.31 in magnitude (U=2).

According to the survey carried out by the NEOWISE mission of NASA's space-based Wide-field Infrared Survey Explorer, the asteroid measures 4.6 kilometers in diameter and its surface has an albedo of 0.21, while the Collaborative Asteroid Lightcurve Link assumes a standard albedo for stony asteroids of 0.20 and calculates a diameter of 4.4 kilometers.
