= Wolf Wilhelm Friedrich von Baudissin =

German Protestant theologian (1847-1926)

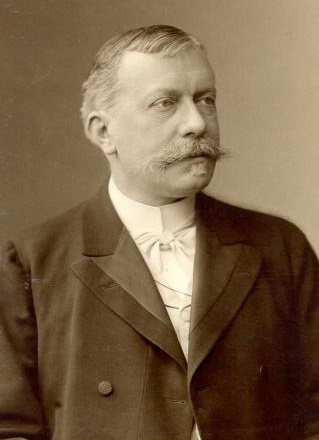
- Born: 26 September 1847
- Died: 6 February 1926 (aged 78)

Academic background
- Education: University of Berlin; University of Erlangen; University of Leipzig; University of Kiel

Academic work
- Discipline: theology
- Institutions: University of Strassburg; University of Marburg; University of Berlin
- Main interests: Old Testament

Wolf Wilhelm Friedrich Graf von Baudissin (26 September 1847 – 6 February 1926) was a German Protestant theologian who was a native of Sophienhof, near Kiel.

== Education ==
Baudissin studied theology and Oriental studies at Berlin, Erlangen, Leipzig and Kiel, earning his doctorate in 1870 at Leipzig.

== Academic work ==
In Leipzig, Baudissin worked as privatdocent from 1874 to 1876. In 1876 he was appointed associate professor of theology at the University of Strassburg, where four years later he gained a full professorship.

In 1881 he became a professor of Old Testament exegesis at the University of Marburg, where he remained until 1900. From 1900 to 1921, he was a professor at the University of Berlin. He was rector of the university in 1912–1913. Theologian Franz Delitzsch and Orientalist Heinrich Leberecht Fleischer were major influences in his career.

== Field of work ==
Baudissin was a prominent figure in the Religionsgeschichtliche Schule (School of Religious History). He is largely remembered for his work involving analysis of various ancient Semitic faiths in order to clarify the religious meaning of the Biblical Old Testament.

Baudissin is referenced in Harold Frederic's novel The Damnation of Theron Ware.

== Selected publications ==
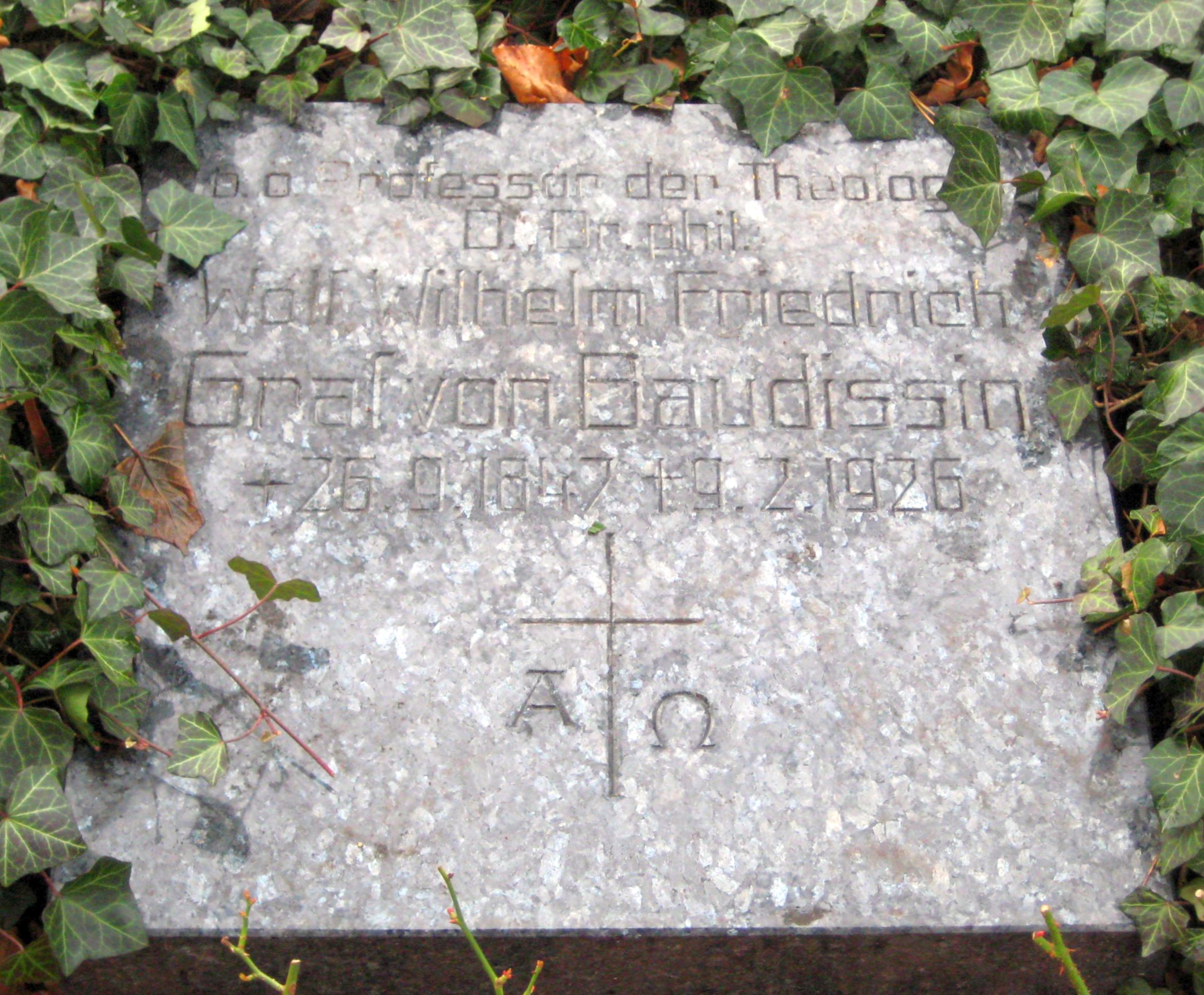
Gravesite of Wolf Wilhelm Friedrich von Baudissin in Berlin

- Translationis antiquæ arabicæ libri Jobi quæ supersunt nunc primum edita (Leipzig, 1870).
- Eulogius und Alvar, ein Abschnitt spanischer Kirchengeschichte aus der Zeit der Maurenherrschaft (1872).
- Jahve et Moloch, sive de ratione inter deum Israelitarum et Molochum intercedente (1874).
- Studien zur semitischen Religionsgeschichte (two volumes, 1876–1878).
- Die Geschichte des alttestamentlichen Priesterthums untersucht (1889).
- August Dillmann (1895) – biography of August Dillmann.
- Einleitung in die Bücher des Alten Testaments (1901).
- Esmun-Asklepios (Giessen, 1906).
