= J. A. Lawrence =

American sketch artist and short fiction writer

Judith Ann Lawrence
- Born: Judith Ann Lawrence; December 14, 1934 (age 91); New York City, US
- Spouse: James Blish (m. 1964; died 1975)
- Writing career
- Pen name: J. A. Lawrence, Judy Blish
- Years active: 1968–2009
- Genre: Science fiction

Judith Ann Blish (née Lawrence; born December 14, 1934) is an American sketch artist and short fiction writer, known professionally as Judith L. Blish, Judy Blish, and J. A. Lawrence. From 1967 to 1978, she co-wrote a sequence of short story adaptations based on episodes of Star Trek with her husband, James Blish.

Since 1975, Lawrence has been active in preserving and promoting her husband's work.

== Early life ==
Lawrence was born on December 14, 1934, to pulp-fiction writers Jack Lawrence and Muriel Bodkin.

She and James Blish met sometime after his divorce from Virginia Kidd, in 1963. Lawrence and Blish married in November 1964. In 1968, she and Blish moved to Oxford, England. Her mother followed sometime later.

After her husband's death, in 1975, Lawrence spent considerable time in Athens, Greece. She settled there permanently in 1977.

== Career ==
Lawrence illustrated the covers to editions of Black Easter and The Day After Judgment. She also sketched the cover of Fugue for a Darkening Island by Christopher Priest. She contributed two covers to the Kalki: Studies in James Branch Cabell fanzine, for which she served as Art Director from 1967 to 1971. Lawrence created the cover for the April 1972 issue of The Magazine of Fantasy & Science Fiction. Lawrence's short fiction was regularly published by Galaxy Science Fiction, and was included in several short-fiction anthologies.

In 1975, James Blish was unable to complete his commission to adapt Star Trek episodes for Bantam Books. Lawrence completed the adaptations which were published in 1977. Lawrence and her mother, Muriel, had contributed to Blish's Star Trek adaptations since 1972. However, Lawrence was not credited until Star Trek 12 (1977). The last volume in the series, Mudd's Angels, was released in 1978. It included two episode adaptations credited to James Blish that featured the popular Harry Mudd character. Included was an original novella by Lawrence, The Business, as Usual, During Altercations. In the introduction to Mudd's Angels, it is stated Blish left the adaptations incomplete and Lawrence "finished them."

== Bibliography ==
=== Cover art and illustrations ===
- Black Easter (September 1969), by James Blish. Doubleday.
- Kalki: Studies in James Branch Cabell, Vol. II, No. 4(a) (1968).
- The Vanished Jet (1968), by James Blish. Weybright & Talley.
- Kalki: Studies in James Branch Cabell, Vol. V, No. 2 (1971).
- The Day After Judgment (January 1971), by James Blish. Doubleday.
- Fugue for a Darkening Island (21 February 1972), by Christopher Priest. Faber and Faber ISBN 0-571-09794-4.
- The Magazine of Fantasy and Science Fiction, Vol 42, No. 4 (Apr 1972).
- Jack of Eagles (18 June 1973), by James Blish. Faber and Faber ISBN 0-571-10276-X.

=== Short fiction ===
- "Getting Along", with James Blish, Again, Dangerous Visions (March 1972). Harlan Ellison, ed. Doubleday.
- "Opening Problem," Galaxy, Vol. 35, No. 7 (July 1974).
- "Family Program," Galaxy, Vol. 36, No. 9 (September 1974).
- "The Descent of Man," If, Vol. 22, No. 8, Issue No. 175 (November 1974).
- "The Persistence of Memory," Galaxy, Vol. 35, No. 10 (November 1974).
- "Twinkle, Twinkle, Little Bat," New Dimensions Science Fiction 7 (April 1977), Robert Silverberg, ed. Harper & Row ISBN 0-06-013862-9.
- "This Is My Beloved," New Dimensions Science Fiction 8 (April 1978), Robert Silverberg, ed. Harper & Row ISBN 0-06-013792-4.
- "Starstuff" (Sternenstoff, translation), Science Fiction Story-Reader 10 (July 1978), Herbert W. Franke, ed. Heyne SF #3602, Heyne ISBN 3-453-30509-4.
- "The Liberated Woman's Guide to Domestic Felicity" (as translation of "Anleitung zum häuslichen Glück für die emanzipierte Frau" by Frank Freeperson), Science Fiction Story-Reader 12 (July 1979), Herbert W. Franke, ed. Heyne SF #3655, Heyne ISBN 3-453-30569-8.
- "Heir," After the Fall (September 1980), Robert Sheckley, ed. Ace Books ISBN 0-441-00941-7.
- "Nothing But," Proteus: Voices for the 80s (May 1981), Richard S. McEnroe, ed. Ace Books ISBN 0-441-68697-4.
- Some Are Born Great (novella), Amazing Science Fiction Stories, Vol. 58, No. 2, Issue 517 (July 1984).
- "White Empire," with James Blish, Fantasy Book, Vol. 5, No. 3 (September 1986).
- "The Other Side of the Surface" (1 April 2021), ReAnimus Press ISBN 979-8-7314241-2-7.

=== Star Trek (1977–78) ===
- Star Trek 12 (November 1977), with James Blish, Bantam Books ISBN 0-553-11382-8
- Mudd's Angels (May 1978), Bantam Books ISBN 0-553-11802-1
