= Ward Street Bordello District =

Neighborhood of Jacksonville, Florida

The Ward Street Bordello District, or "The Line" was a district of over 64 bordellos which were located along Ward Street in Jacksonville, Florida, US.

Also known as 'resorts' at the close of the 19th century, all of the Bordellos of Ward Street survived the Great Fire of 1901, and played an integral part in the rebuilding and development of Jacksonville, Florida through the first part of the 20th century.

Notable Brothel owner Cora Crane built her signature establishment, "The Court" along Ward Street, and Temperance Movement leader, Carry A. Nation made a celebrated appearance after which she declared the city a 'Demonocracy'.

Mayor J.E.T. Bowden, who had been the Mayor of Greater Jacksonville during the Great Fire of 1901 successfully came out of retirement and won a landslide re-election on the single issue of protecting the Bordellos and keeping them legal.

The Bordellos remained legitimate businesses in Jacksonville until 1953, and the last of the Grand Houses were demolished in 1981.

== Notable Bordellos of Ward Street: The Grande Dames ==
The Senate

The New York House

Russian Belle Built and owned by Belle Orloff, the Russian Madame famous for sending Carry A. Nation packing after an attempted raid on the part of the Temperance Crusader.

The "Turkish Bath"

The Court Built and owned by Cora Crane, it was the grandest of the Grande Dames.
