= A Case of Conscience =

1958 science fiction novel by James Blish

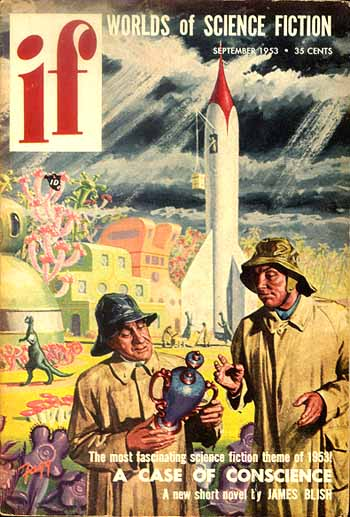
- Cover by Ken Fagg
- Author: James Blish
- Language: English
- Genre: Science fiction
- Published in: If magazine
- Publication date: September 1953
- Media type: Magazine
- Awards: Retro Hugo Award for Best Novella (1954, awarded 2004)

A Case of Conscience
- Paperback first edition
- Author: James Blish
- Cover artist: Richard M. Powers
- Language: English
- Series: After Such Knowledge trilogy
- Genre: Science fiction
- Published: 1958 (Ballantine Books)
- Publication place: United States
- Media type: Print (paperback)
- Pages: 192
- Awards: Hugo Award for Best Novel (1959)
- ISBN: 0-345-43835-3 (later paperback printing)
- Dewey Decimal: 813/.54 21
- LC Class: PS3503.L64 C37 2000
- Followed by: Doctor Mirabilis; Black Easter; The Day After Judgment

A Case of Conscience is a science fiction novel by American writer James Blish, first published in 1958. It is the story of a Jesuit who investigates an alien race that has no religion yet has a perfect, innate sense of morality, a situation which conflicts with Catholic teaching. The story was originally published as a novella-length "short novel" in the September 1953 issue of the If magazine. This novella won a Retrospective Hugo Award for Best Novella in 2004. In 1958, it was extended to a full-length-novel, of which the first part is the original novella. The novel, which won the Hugo Award for Best Novel in 1959, is the first part of Blish's thematic After Such Knowledge trilogy and was followed by Doctor Mirabilis and both Black Easter and The Day After Judgment (two novellas that Blish viewed as together forming the third volume of the trilogy).

Few science fiction stories of the time attempted religious themes, and still fewer did this with Catholicism.

== Plot ==
=== Part 1 ===
In 2049, Father Ramon Ruiz-Sanchez of Peru, Clerk Regular of the Society of Jesus, is a member of a four-man team of scientists sent to the planet Lithia to determine if it can be opened to human contact. Ruiz-Sanchez is a biologist and biochemist, and he serves as the team doctor. However, as a Jesuit, he has religious concerns as well. The planet is inhabited by a race of intelligent bipedal reptile-like creatures, the Lithians. Ruiz-Sanchez has learned to speak their language to learn about them.

While on a walking survey of the land, Cleaver, a physicist, is poisoned by a plant, despite a protective suit, and he suffers badly. Ruiz-Sanchez treats him and leaves to send a message to the others: Michelis, a chemist, and Agronski, a geologist. He is helped by Chtexa, a Lithian whom he has befriended, who then invites him to his house. This is an opportunity which Ruiz-Sanchez cannot decline; no member of the team has been invited into Lithian living places before. The Lithians seem to have an ideal society, a utopia without crime, conflict, ignorance or want. Ruiz-Sanchez is awed.

When the team is reassembled, they compare their observations of the Lithians. Soon they will have to officially pronounce their verdict. Michelis is open-minded and sympathetic to the Lithians. He has learned their language and some of their customs. Agronski is more insular in his outlook, but he sees no reason to consider the planet dangerous. When Cleaver revives, he reveals that he wants the place exploited, regardless of the Lithians' wishes. He has found enough pegmatite (a source of lithium, which is rare on Earth) that a factory could be set up to supply Earth with lithium deuteride for nuclear weapons. Michelis is for open trade. Agronski is indifferent.

Ruiz-Sanchez makes a major declaration: he wants maximum quarantine. The information Chtexa revealed to him, added to what he already knew, convinces him that Lithia is nothing less than the work of Satan, a place deliberately constructed to show peace, logic, and understanding in the complete absence of God. Point for point, Ruiz-Sanchez lists the facts about Lithia that directly attack Catholic teaching. Michelis is mystified, but does point out that all the Lithian science he has learned, while perfectly logical, rests on highly questionable assumptions. It is as if it just came from nowhere.

The team can come to no agreement. Ruiz-Sanchez concludes that Cleaver's intentions will probably prevail and Lithian society will be exterminated. Despite his conclusions about the planet, he has a deep affection for the Lithians.

As the humans board their ship to leave, Chtexa gives Ruiz-Sanchez a gift—a sealed jar containing an egg. It is a son of Chtexa, to be raised on Earth and learn the ways of humans. At this point, the Jesuit solves a riddle which he has been pondering for some time, from Book III of Finnegans Wake by James Joyce (pp. 572–3), which proposes a complex case of marital morals, ending with the question "Has he hegemony and shall she submit?" To the Church, neither "Yes" nor "No" is a morally satisfactory answer. Ruiz-Sanchez sees that it is two questions, despite the omission of a comma between the two, so that the answer can be "Yes and No".

=== Part 2 ===
The egg hatches and grows into the individual Egtverchi. Like all Lithians, he inherits knowledge from his father through his DNA. Earth society is based on the nuclear shelters of the 20th century, with most people living underground. Egtverchi is the proverbial firecracker in an anthill; he upends society and precipitates violence.

Ruiz-Sanchez has to go to Rome to face judgment. His conviction about Lithia is viewed as heresy, since he believes Satan has the power to create a planet. This is close to Manichaeism. He has an audience with the Pope himself to explain his beliefs. Pope Hadrian VIII, a logically and technologically aware Norwegian, points out two things Ruiz-Sanchez missed. First, Lithia could have been a deception, not a creation. And second, Ruiz-Sanchez could have done something about it, namely, perform an exorcism on the whole planet. The priest bows his head in shame that he has overlooked an obvious solution to his own case of conscience while he was absorbed in "a book [Finnegans Wake] which to all intents and purposes might have been dictated by the Adversary himself ... 628 pages of compulsive demoniac chatter." The Pope dismisses Ruiz-Sanchez to purge his own soul and to return to the Church if and when he can.

A violent mass riot breaks out, fomented by Egtverchi and made possible by the psychosis present in many of the citizens as a result of living in the 'shelter state' (an earlier reference to the "Corridor Riots of 1993" indicates that this is not the first time violence has burst out among the buried cities). During the riot, Agronski dies as a result of being stung by one or more genetically modified honey bees. Ruiz-Sanchez administers Extreme Unction, despite his almost-faithless state. Egtverchi secretly boards a spaceship to Lithia. Michelis and Ruiz-Sanchez are taken to the Moon, where a new telescope has been assembled, based on "a fundamental twist on the Haertel equations which makes it possible to see around normal space-time, as well as travel around it" so that the instrument presents a view of Lithia in real time, bypassing the delay caused by the speed of light. Cleaver is on Lithia, setting up his reactors, but the physicist who invented the telescope technology believes he has found a fault in Cleaver's reasoning. There is a chance that the work will set off a chain reaction in the planet's rocks and destroy it.

As they watch on the screen, Ruiz-Sanchez pronounces an exorcism. The planet explodes, eliminating Cleaver and Egtverchi, but also Chtexa and all the things Ruiz-Sanchez admired. It is left ambiguous whether the extinction of the Lithians is a result of Ruiz-Sanchez's prayer or Cleaver's error.

== Reception ==
While faulting the novel for "extreme unevenness", Galaxy reviewer Floyd C. Gale concluded that A Case of Conscience was "a provocative, serious, commendable work" and characterized it as "trailblaz[ing]". Anthony Boucher found Blish's protagonist "a credible and moving figure" and praised the opening segment; however he faulted the later material for "los[ing] focus and impact" and "wander[ing]" to an ending that seems "merely chaotic." In his "Books" column for The Magazine of Fantasy & Science Fiction, Damon Knight selected Blish's novel as one of the ten best science fiction books of the 1950s. He reviewed the novel as "resonat[ing] with a note of its own. . . . it is complete and perfect."

On the other hand, Br. Guy Consolmagno, S.J., the director of the Vatican Observatory, suggested that this novel was written without much knowledge of Jesuits, saying that "[its] theology isn't only bad theology, it's not Jesuit theology." In a foreword, Blish mentions that he had heard objections to the theology, but countered that the theology was that of a future Church rather than the present one, and that in any case he set out to write about "not a body of faith, but a man". He also received, and quoted, the official Church policy on contact with extraterrestrial intelligent life forms. The policy described such life forms as being possibly without immortal souls, or having immortal souls and being "fallen", or having souls and existing in a state of Grace, listing the approach to be taken in each case.

In 2012 the novel was included in the Library of America two-volume boxed set American Science Fiction: Nine Classic Novels of the 1950s, edited by Gary K. Wolfe.

== Awards and nominations ==
The novel won a Hugo Award in 1959. The original novella won a Retrospective Hugo Award in 2004.

== See also ==
- 1958 in science fiction
- Arthur C. Clarke's short story "The Star", in which a Jesuit scientist finds out a faith-shaking fact about a supernova
- Rebuttal by Betsy Curtis, a sequel and response to The Star, with a doctor who is also a priest speaking with the original story's narrator after his return to Earth
- Mary Doria Russell's The Sparrow and sequel Children of God which feature a Jesuit linguist/priest who has a crisis of faith confronting alien cultures
- Stanisław Lem's Fiasko with priest/physician (psychiatrist), although Dominican, and alien, inhabited, planet, severely damaged (but not completely destroyed) by human expedition

== General and cited references ==
- Blish, James (1999). A Case of Conscience. London: Millennium. ISBN 1-85798-924-4. OCLC 43540200.
- Tuck, Donald H. (1974). The Encyclopedia of Science Fiction and Fantasy. Vol. 1?. Chicago: Advent. p. 28. ISBN 0-911682-20-1.
