= The Market Place =

1899 novel by Harold Frederic

- Author: Harold Frederic
- Language: English
- Publication date: 1899

The Market Place is an 1899 novel by American author Harold Frederic. It was published posthumously in 1899, following his death the previous year.

The book's publication and success as a bestseller led to a conflict over Frederic's estate between his wife Grace Frederic and mistress Kate Lyon. This resulted in a scandal involving much of London's Victorian society. The resulting furor led to the jailing of Lyon on charges of manslaughter at the behest of his wife. Another notable American figure of the time, Cora Crane, the companion of author Stephen Crane, sheltered his three children with Lyon while she was jailed pending trial. She was acquitted.

The novel was among the best selling books in the United States in 1899.

== Reception ==
American author Willa Cather wrote:

Unusual interest is attached to the posthumous work of that great man whose career ended so prematurely and so tragically. The story is a study in the ethics and purposes of money-getting, in the romantic element in modern business. In it finance is presented not as being merely the province of shrewdness, or greediness, or petty personal gratification, but of great projects, of great brain-battles, a field for the exercising of talent, daring, imagination, appealing to the strength of a strong man, filling the same place in men's lives that was once filled by the incentives of war... The hero of the story, "Joel Thorpe," is one of those men, huge of body, keen of brain, with cast iron nerves, as sound a heart as most men, and a magnificent capacity for bluff. He has lived and risked and lost in a dozen countries, been almost within reach of fortune a dozen times, and always missed her until, finally, in London, by promoting a great rubber syndicate he becomes a multi-millionaire. He marries the most beautiful and one of the most impecunious peeresses in England and retires to his country estate. There, as a gentleman of leisure, he loses his motive in life, loses power for lack of opportunity, and grows less commanding even in the eyes of his wife, who misses the uncompromising, barbaric strength which took her by storm and won her. Finally he evolves a gigantic philanthropic scheme of spending his money as laboriously as he made it.

It is very fitting that Mr. Frederic's last book should be in praise of action, the thing that makes the world go round; of force, however misspent, which is the sum of life as distinguished from the inertia of death. In the forty-odd years of his life he wrote almost as many pages as Balzac, most of it mere newspaper copy, it is true, read and forgotten, but all of it vigorous and with the stamp of a strong man upon it. And he played just as hard as he worked—alas, it was the play that killed him! The young artist who illustrated the story gave to the pictures of "Joel Thorpe" very much the look of Harold Frederic himself, and they might almost stand for his portraits. I fancy the young man did not select his model carelessly... The man won his place in England much as his hero won his, by defiance, by strong shoulder blows, by his self-sufficiency and inexhaustible strength...

In point of execution and literary excellence, both The Market Place and Gloria Mundi are vastly inferior to The Damnation of Theron Ware, or that exquisite London idyl, March Hares... Both Gloria Mundi and The Market Place bear unmistakable evidences of the slack rein and the hasty hand. Both of them contain considerable padding, the stamp of the space writer. They are imperfectly developed, and are not packed with ideas like his earlier novels. Their excellence is in flashes; it is not the searching, evenly distributed light which permeates his more careful work. There were, as we know too well, good reasons why Mr. Frederic should work hastily. He needed a large income and he worked heroically, writing many thousands of words a day to obtain it... Achilles was a god in all his nobler parts, but his feet were of the earth and to the earth they held him down, and he died stung by an arrow in the heel.
