= The Day After Judgment =

1970 novel by James Blish

- Hardcover first edition
- Author: James Blish
- Cover artist: Judith Ann Lawrence
- Language: English
- Series: After Such Knowledge trilogy
- Genre: Fantasy
- Publisher: Doubleday
- Publication date: 1970
- Publication place: United Kingdom
- Media type: Print (Hardcover & Paperback)
- Pages: 166
- OCLC: 1562480
- Preceded by: A Case of Conscience; Doctor Mirabilis; Black Easter

The Day After Judgment is a 1970 fantasy novel by American writer James Blish. It is a sequel to the 1968 novel Black Easter: they have been subsequently republished in 1990 as a single book called The Devil's Day.

== Plot summary ==
Black Easter and The Day After Judgment were written with the assumption that the ritual magic for commanding demons, as described in grimoires, actually works.

In the first book, a wealthy arms manufacturer comes to a black magician, Theron Ware, with a strange request: he wishes to release all the demons from Hell on Earth for one night to see what might happen. The book includes a lengthy description of the summoning ritual and a detailed description of the grotesque demons as they appear. Tension between Ware and Catholic white magicians arises over the terms and conditions of a covenant that provides for observers and limitations on interference with demonic workings. Black Easter ends with Baphomet announcing to the participants that the demons cannot be compelled to return to Hell: the war is over and God is dead.

The Day After Judgment develops and extends the characters from the first book. It suggests that God may not be dead, or that demons may not be inherently self-destructive, as something appears to be restraining the actions of the demons upon Earth. In a lengthy Miltonian speech at the end of the novel, Satan Mekratrig explains that, compared to humans, demons are good, and that if perhaps God has withdrawn Himself, then Satan beyond all others was qualified to take His place and, if anything, would be a more just god.

It has been suggested that Blish got the name for his black magician from the titular character in Harold Frederic's 1896 novel The Damnation of Theron Ware.

The events culminate in a battle of the US Army against demons in Death Valley, where the American forces are decisively defeated, driving the President to suicidal insanity; the novel ends in the supernatural forces disappearing and leaving the characters in "the modern town of Badwater".

== Sources ==
- Ketterer, David (1987). Imprisoned in a tesseract: The Life and Work of James Blish. Kent State University Press. ISBN 978-0-87338-334-9.
