= The Quincunx of Time =

1973 novel by James Blish

- First edition cover.
- Author: James Blish
- Language: English
- Genre: Science fiction
- Publisher: Dell Publishing
- Publication date: October 1973
- Publication place: United States
- Media type: Print (paperback)
- Pages: 128 (paperback edition)
- ISBN: 0-380-65185-8 (1983 Avon reprint)
- OCLC: 10226769

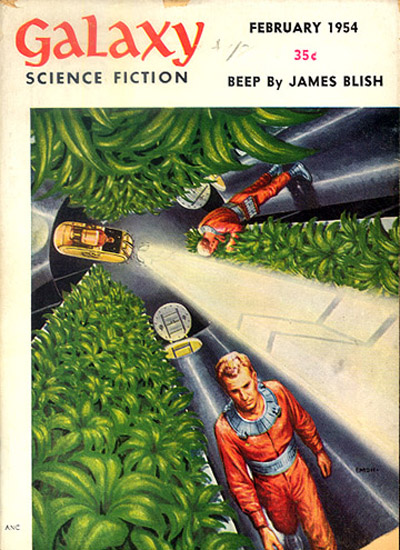
"Beep" was originally published in the February 1954 issue of Galaxy Science Fiction.Art by Ed Emshwiller

The Quincunx of Time is a short science fiction novel by American writer James Blish. It is an extended version of a short story entitled "Beep", published by Galaxy Science Fiction magazine in 1954. The novel form was first published in 1973.

== Setting ==
Late in the 21st century, a device called the Dirac communicator promises instantaneous communication across interstellar distances. This would allow Earth security, headed by one Robin Weinbaum, to keep the peace. Before one of the devices can even reach a far-away system, someone starts producing predictions that suggest they have advance knowledge of Dirac communications.

Eventually it is realized that the new technology incorporates a way of learning about future events. The result is a lengthy discussion of free will versus determinism.

== Plot summary ==
Capt. Robin Weinbaum of Earth Security submits to a request for an interview from Dana Lje, a video commentator, mostly because she can and has made his life difficult with her reporting of Security lapses, especially in a recent case involving the Government of Erskine, another planetary system. Ms. Lje reveals that she has received a communication from an outfit calling itself "Interstellar Information Ltd." about an incident in a star system so far away that even by a faster-than-light ship, no message could return from it in less than two months. The incident in fact is due to take place in the next few days. The communication also alleges that there is a new device aboard the ship, and gives the name of the device.

When Weinbaum hears the name—the Dirac communicator—he is forced to believe that Interstellar Information have access to information even he doesn't have. He brings in Dr. Thor Wald to explain the Dirac device to Dana Lje. She agrees to play along with Interstellar and its owner, J. Shelby Stevens, to let Security find out how the company gets its information.

A long investigation turns up exactly nothing. Even when J. Shelby Stevens allows an interview, under the conditions of so-called "stoolie's arrest" in which he voluntarily places himself in custody for interview, with a guarantee of being set free immediately afterward, there is no progress. The only result is that Stevens predicts the date of their next meeting.

Weinbaum uses the Dirac device to communicate with his agents, even though he suspects the communications may not be secure. Each audiovisual message is preceded by a loud beep and burst of visual static, which is so annoying that Weinbaum orders it edited from the tapes he reviews.

Finally Weinbaum discovers who Stevens really is, and to his amazement the day this happens is the exact day Stevens predicted they would meet again. He orders his agents to arrest the miscreant.

The explanation he gets is this: the beep that he found so annoying represents all the messages ever sent, or that ever will be sent, using the Dirac device. With proper techniques, it is possible to extract any message, whether it be recent, or far in the future.

Weinbaum realizes that this is an incredible and dangerous thing. On the one hand he can be ready for any hostile act on the part of Earth's enemies, but on the other he may, by choosing some events over others, affect the course of future history. The final chapters of the book are a long and well-informed discussion on free will and determinism (the preface of the novel has a quote on the subject from philosopher William James). Eventually Weinbaum decides that the best choice is no choice at all. If information in the beep states that something will happen, then his agents must make sure that it happens. He calls this principle "Thy will, not mine".

== Characters ==
- Robin Weinbaum is Head of Security on Earth.
- Thor Wald is a physicist, mathematician, and inventor of the Dirac communicator.
- Dana Lje is a journalist and media star of Dutch and Indonesian ancestry, who recently exposed a major lapse of Security in the so-called "Erskine affair". She contacts Earth Security after receiving information from Interstellar Information Ltd..
- "J. Shelby Stevens" is a mysterious figure, owner and sole proprietor of Interstellar Information, Ltd.. He has access to information that he could only have received via the top-secret Dirac device, but not only is this device supposed to be a secret, his communications using it cannot be picked up by the authorities, an apparent impossibility. When he makes his first and last appearance in the plot, he seems to be an old man. But is he?

== Major themes ==
Blish, in a foreword to the novel, discusses the need he felt to expand the original short story. It arose because Larry Shaw, who had encouraged him to expand the novella A Case of Conscience into an award-winning novel, recognized that the story raised issues that Blish himself could and should write about at length.

Once it becomes clear to all the characters that the beep contains information from the future, each interprets the information in his or her own way. Dana Lje expresses the opinion that cause and effect are simply a construct of the mind, that events are fixed and the human consciousness is simply an observer. As far as she is concerned, she was forewarned of the events of the story and chose to follow the path that made them happen. Thor Wald takes the scientific point of view, noting that as newer theories replace older ones it is merely because they are more convenient or more accurate. Their relationship to reality is a matter of conjecture. He believes that, once enough dimensions of space-time are invoked, free will becomes inevitable.

Weinbaum has more immediate concerns. As one of his successors points out in the story which frames the novel, the problem with any message is context. The further removed from the current situation, the worse the problem is. The narrative even quotes the then-fashionable theory of paradigms of Thomas Kuhn, in order to show how shifting viewpoints can lead to different interpretations of a message. Weinbaum's conclusion was the only one which avoided the paradigm problem, in that it simply required the Security Service to act to make sure events happened as described, rather than trying to prescribe new events based on a potentially faulty understanding of a message.

== Allusions/references to other works ==
- At least one of the future messages alludes to events in other Blish novels. For instance, one message describes events in the novel Midsummer Century.
- As with many of his stories featuring faster-than-light travel, Blish credits the discovery to a scientist called Haertel, apparently a childhood prodigy. The character "Dolph Haertel" appears in the novel Welcome to Mars as just such a prodigy, who flies to Mars using a space drive he invents in his back yard.
- In one message, the motto Mundus vult decipi (The world wishes to be deceived) appears. This also appears in the work of author James Branch Cabell. Blish was, for a time, editor of Kalki, the journal of the Cabell Society.
- Captain Weinbaum, referring to Mundus vult decipi, comments that it reminds him of a quote expressing a similar attitude, "To conceal from a man his own nature is the easiest of all tasks, and the basis of civilized intercourse." He's not sure who said it, but thinks it might have been Lord Gro, a major character in The Worm Ouroboros by E.R. Eddison.
