= Charles P. de Saint-Aignan =

American software engineer

Minor planets discovered: 12
| 8371 Goven | October 2, 1991 |
| 8710 Hawley | May 15, 1994 |
| 12306 Pebronstein | October 7, 1991 |
| 12373 Lancearmstrong | May 15, 1994 |
| 12374 Rakhat | May 15, 1994 |
| (16553) 1991 TL14 | October 7, 1991 |
| 20017 Alixcatherine | October 2, 1991 |
| (21083) 1991 TH14 | October 2, 1991 |
| (39544) 1991 TN14 | October 7, 1991 |
| (42493) 1991 TG14 | October 2, 1991 |
| (58295) 1994 JJ9 | May 15, 1994 |
| (100048) 1991 TE14 | October 2, 1991 |

Charles P. de Saint-Aignan (born 16 February 1977, Paris) is an American software engineer who works for IBM on the IBM Watson project. He graduated from St. Paul's School (Concord, New Hampshire), in 1995, followed by Brown University (Providence, Rhode Island), in 1999.

In 1994, de Saint-Aignan worked for Ted Bowell at Lowell Observatory, where he discovered a number of asteroids. He named his first discovery, 8710 Hawley, after Walter N. Hawley, who was his high school physics and astronomy teacher.

The minor planet 5995 Saint-Aignan was named in de Saint-Aignan's honor on the occasion of his 20th birthday.
