= Norman L. Knight =

American novelist

- Born: Norman Louis Knight; 21 September 1895; St. Joseph, Missouri
- Died: 19 April 1972 (aged 76); Adventist Hospital Takoma Park, Maryland, US
- Occupations: chemist; science fiction writer; fantasy writer
- Spouse: Marie Sarah Knight (née Yenn) (m. 1921)
- Writing career
- Period: 1937–1967
- Genres: Science fiction, Fantasy

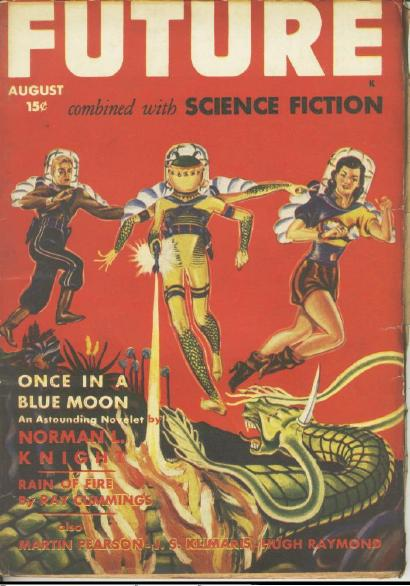
Knight's novella "Once in a Blue Moon" was the cover story for the August 1942 issue of Future

Norman Louis Knight (September 21, 1895 – April 19, 1972) was an American chemist and writer of fantasy and science fiction.

== Biography ==
Knight was born in St. Joseph, Missouri on September 21, 1895. His parents, Louis Ruthven Knight and Mary E. Knight (née Stauber), operated a drugstore at 2109 Messanie Road, with the family living on the second floor.

Knight joined the US Army in 1917. His service in France as a rider with the Signal Corps was interrupted by a bout of influenza. After demobilization, he moved to Davenport, Iowa, joined the nascent National Weather Service, and met his future wife Marie Sarah Yenn, with whom he had one child, a girl named Paula Marie.

== Writings ==
Knight's writing career was relatively abbreviated, consisting mostly of ten stories published in Astounding between 1937 and 1942; these included two serialized novellas. After a more-than-twenty-year hiatus, Knight briefly emerged from retirement in 1965 with the novel A Torrent of Faces, co-written with James Blish. The novel formed a great contrast to Knight's Golden Age fiction, being quite modern in style and outlook. It sold well, and saw several reprints, including an Ace Science Fiction Specials edition. It remains Knight's most prominent work. Several excerpted chapters, published independently in Galaxy Magazine in 1965 as the novelette "The Shipwrecked Hotel", were nominated for the 1966 Nebula Award.

Despite having enjoyed relative success in Golden Age magazines, Knight never achieved recognition during the first phase of his writing career. A rare contemporary critical notice was provided by the celebrated writing couple Edmond Hamilton and Leigh Brackett, who praised his 1939 story Saurian Valedictory as "one of the really great stories on alien mentality", while lamenting that it was "a brilliant achievement, and nobody seems to have heard of it, or him. It was an attempt to depict a reptilian civilization before Man. It succeeded triumphantly; the values were all so different, the psychology".

== Bibliography ==
=== Novels ===
- A Torrent of Faces (novel, 1967) with James Blish

=== Short fiction ===
- "Frontier of the Unknown" (novella, Astounding, July–August 1937)
- "Isle of the Golden Swarm" (short story, Astounding, June 1938)
- "Saurian Valedictory" (novelette, Astounding, January 1939)
- "Bombardment in Reverse" (short story, Astounding, February 1940)
- "The Testament of Akubii" (short story, Astounding, June 1940)
- "Crisis in Utopia" (novella, Astounding, July–August 1940)
- "Short-Circuited Probability" (short story, Astounding, September 1941)
- "Fugitive from Vanguard" (short story, Astounding, January 1942)
- "Kilgallen's Lunar Legacy" (short story, Astounding, August 1942)
- "Once in a Blue Moon" (short story, Future Combined with Science Fiction, August 1942)
- "The Shipwrecked Hotel" (novelette, Galaxy Magazine, August 1965; )
- "The Piper of Dis" (novelette, Galaxy Magazine, August 1966)
- "To Love Another" (novelette, Analog, April 1967)
