= The Sparrow (novel) =

1996 novel by Mary Doria Russell

- Cover of first edition (hardcover)
- Author: Mary Doria Russell
- Language: English
- Genre: Science fiction, Philosophical, Mystery fiction
- Publisher: Villard
- Publication date: 1996
- Publication place: United States
- Media type: Print (hardback & paperback)
- Pages: 408 pp
- ISBN: 0-679-45150-1
- OCLC: 34281380
- Dewey Decimal: 813/.54 20
- LC Class: PS3568.U76678 S63 1996
- Followed by: Children of God

The Sparrow (1996) is the first novel by author Mary Doria Russell. It won the Arthur C. Clarke Award, James Tiptree Jr. Award, Kurd-Laßwitz-Preis and the British Science Fiction Association Award. It was followed by a sequel, Children of God, in 1998. The title refers to Gospel of Matthew 10:29–31, which relates that not even a sparrow falls to the earth without God's knowledge thereof.

== Plot ==
In the year 2019, the SETI program at Arecibo Observatory discovers radio broadcasts of music from the vicinity of Alpha Centauri. The first expedition to Rakhat, the world that is sending the music, is organized by the Society of Jesus (Jesuits), known for its missionary, linguistic and scientific activities since the time of its founder, Ignatius of Loyola. In the year 2060, only one of the crew, the Jesuit priest Emilio Sandoz, survives to return to Earth, and he is damaged physically and psychologically. The story is told with parallel plot lines, interspersing the journey of Sandoz and his friends to Rakhat with Sandoz's experiences upon his return to Earth.

Father Sandoz is a talented Puerto Rican linguist. He is described as of mixed Taíno and Conquistador heritage and character. Sandoz grew up in La Perla, a poor neighborhood in San Juan. He joined the Jesuits as a teenager. After several stints at Jesuit missionaries around the world, he returns to Puerto Rico. Several of his close friends and co-workers, people with a variety of unique skills and talents, have seemingly coincidental connections to Arecibo. One of them, Jimmy, a gifted young technician, was the first to hear the transmissions; another, Sofia Mendes, a Turkish Jewish artificial intelligence specialist and indentured servant, has the connections and aptitude to obtain a spacecraft and help pilot the mission. Sandoz, who has often struggled with his faith, becomes convinced that only God's will could bring this group of people with the perfect combination of knowledge and experience together at the moment when the alien signal was detected. Sandoz and his friends, along with three other Jesuit priests, are chosen by the Society of Jesus to travel in secret to the planet, using an interstellar vessel made with a small asteroid.

Upon reaching Rakhat, the crew tries to acclimatize themselves to the new world, experimenting with eating local flora and fauna, then making contact with a rural village, inhabited by a peaceful tribe of herbivore gatherers, the Runa. Though the Runa are clearly not the singers of the radio broadcasts, the Earthlings settle among them and begin to learn their language (Ruanja) and culture. Although Sandoz struggles with his attraction to Sofia, he finds greater spiritual meaning in his interactions with the Runa. The crew transmits all their findings via computer uplink to the asteroid-ship in orbit. Some of the crew experience illness, one of whom dies shortly after landing on Rakhat. One day, in an attempt to retrieve supplies from their landing vehicle for a sick crew member, the landing vehicle runs short of the fuel needed to safely return to the asteroid ship, and the crew must face the reality that they may never return to Earth.

When the Earthlings finally meet a member of the culture that produced the radio transmissions, he proves to be of an entirely different species from the rural natives, a Jana'ata. He is an ambitious merchant named Supaari VaGayjur. Supaari is socially restricted from having children on account of his birth order. He idolizes the Reshtar of Galatna, a poet and musician, who though bereft of breeding rights like him was awarded social and political status on account of his accomplishments; it is revealed that the Reshtar creates and broadcasts the beautiful music, which is inspired by his orgasms. Supaari VaGayjur sees in the visitors a possibility to improve his status. Meanwhile, the crew hopes that Supaari will take them to the Jana'ata city, Gayjur, in hopes of finding an alternative source of fuel and to study and learn the culture of the Jana'ata. After a year of living on Rakhat, the crew increasingly adopts Earthly customs. The party introduces the concept of agriculture to the villagers by building a garden in the Runa village. The crew ultimately dismisses Runa stories of mysterious monsters that lurk at night, having seen nothing of the sort for the year they have been on the planet. These seemingly innocent actions and accompanying cultural misunderstandings precipitate occasions of violence.

Though not closely related genetically, the Jana'ata have evolved by aggressive mimicry to physically resemble the Runa, who are in fact their prey species. Some roguish Jana'ata, who the crew later learns from Supaari are criminals, continue to illegally hunt Runa. Two crew members, Anne and D.W., are killed by a rogue Jana'ata during a walk in the middle of the night. The remainder having left their predatory methods in the past, the civilized Jana'ata enforce strict regulations on the Runa to limit their breeding, including public executions of Runa. As the human introduction of agriculture leads to a Runa baby boom, a Jana'ata military party arrives to execute the excess Runa from the village. The humans are riven with guilt over their misguided action; Sofia starts to chant "We are many, they are few," and resists the Jana'ata. In fear of loss of social control, the Jana'ata slaughter the group indiscriminately. Most of the crew are killed when defending against the Jana'ata attack.

Only Sandoz and Marc Robichaux survive, and Sandoz endures capture, degradation, and a crisis of faith. Eventually found by Supaari, Sandoz's hands are disfigured and rendered useless in a Jana'ata practice meant to convey the honor and privilege of being dependent on another, a mutilation analogous to the practice of foot binding. The mutilation kills Marc Robichaux; Sandoz survives, though he is physically and spiritually traumatized, believing himself at fault for the death of his friends. Later, Supaari gives Sandoz to the Reshtar in exchange for the right to have a wife and start his own lineage. Held captive by the Reshtar, Sandoz realizes that he is the source of the music that brought the humans to Rakhat and momentarily regains his faith; however, the Reshtar is only interested in Sandoz as a pet who is forced to sexually satisfy the musician, along with his friends and colleagues. Sandoz realizes that the beautiful music heard on earth was the Reshtar's music about his sexual exploits. After enduring trauma from the recurring acts of rape, Sandoz accidentally murders a child Runa named Askama, from whom he had initially learned Ruanja. A different party of humans sent from the U.N., having been led to him by Askama, discovers him and sends him back to Earth.

When Sandoz returns in 2060, his friends are dead, and his faith, once considered worthy of canonization by his superiors, has turned into bitter anger with the god who inspired him to go to Rakhat. Due to relativistic space-time effects, decades had passed while he has been gone, during which popular outrage at the United Nations' initial and highly out-of-context report on the mission, especially Sandoz's role in the tragedy, had left the Society of Jesus shattered, nearly extinct. The Jesuits shelter Sandoz from the media and help him recover physically, while the Father Superior selects a panel of Jesuit priests from around the world to help Sandoz come out of his shell and explain what really happened. Initially bent on discovering the truth, the other priests eventually recognize the great personal cost at which the journey came, and accept Sandoz's epic struggle with his faith. Over the course of several months, Sandoz painfully explains his story and begins his personal healing.

== Similarities to other works ==
The Sparrow is similar to James Blish's science fiction novel A Case of Conscience. It also involves a Jesuit priest confronting an alien civilization. Mary Doria Russell has addressed this speculation:

I get this question all the time, because Blish's 1958 story is about a Spanish Jesuit in space. People have told me that the protagonist is named Ruiz-Sanchez, so they thought I must have named Emilio Sandoz in homage to Blish. In fact, Emilio got his name from the pharmaceutical manufacturer who made my son's cold medicine. Danny got a cold in 1992 when I started the book, and I noticed the name Sandoz on the medicine label and thought it sounded good. No symbolism or homage beyond that, I'm afraid!

== Literary significance and reception ==
Nancy Pearl, in an article in Library Journal about book-club recommendations published five years after The Sparrow came out, felt that this book was mistakenly categorized as science fiction, and that it is really "a philosophical novel about the nature of good and evil and what happens when a man tries to do the right thing, for the right reasons and ends up causing incalculable harm".

However, Pearl's comment about categorization as science fiction is at odds with the author's own assessment. In "Jesuits in Space," her afterword to the 20th-anniversary edition of The Sparrow, Russell repeatedly refers to the book as science fiction, and writes, "At the heart of religion, and at the heart of anthropology, and at the heart of science fiction, there are similar concerns, though there are differences in the kinds of stories we tell and the conclusions that we reach." It's also worth noting that every award (see next section) won by The Sparrow was specifically a science-fiction award.

In the Catholic journal Commonweal, Paul Q. Kane writes that Russell has done her research on the early historic Jesuit missions and on Jesuit spirituality. He continues that she is successfully updating the stories of other important Jesuits who have sent men to distant lands or went themselves to foreign cultures to represent Christianity. "Russell subtly raises concerns about the ways in which sophisticated cultures tell themselves cover stories in order to justify actions taken at a terrible cost to others". This is also reflected in the way that Sofia has to buy her freedom from what she describes as an institution of intellectual prostitution; as well as the differences between the simple Runa who live in the countryside and the Jana'ata, who are the sophisticated city dwellers that created the beautiful music which triggered the mission originally.

== Awards and nominations ==
- The 1996 James Tiptree, Jr. Award
- The 1998 Arthur C. Clarke Award
- The 1998 BSFA Award for Best Novel
- The 1998 John W. Campbell Award for Best New Writer
- The 2001 Kurd Laßwitz Award
- The 2001 Gaylactic Spectrum Hall of Fame (The Sparrow and Children of God together)

== Film, television and theatrical adaptations ==
In March 2006 it was announced that Warner Bros. had purchased the rights to The Sparrow for Brad Pitt's production company, Plan B, and that Pitt himself would be playing the role of Sandoz with screenwriter Michael Seitzman adapting the novel to film.

Since then, Mary Russell has revoked all film rights, believing that Hollywood cannot and will not make a film version of The Sparrow that is faithful to the book. She has written her own screenplay with her assistant Karen Hall, but has realized it has little to no chance of being produced.

In 2014, AMC announced it was developing a television adaptation of the book.

In 2021, Scott Frank announced his plans to adapt The Sparrow as a miniseries, to be presented on FX. Johan Renck is being looked at to direct, with Frank, Renck, and Mark Johnson signed on as executive producers.

== Related works ==
- James Blish's A Case of Conscience also has a Jesuit priest confronting an alien civilization.
- In Arthur C. Clarke's short story "The Star" a Jesuit scientist finds out a faith-shaking fact about a supernova.
- Stanisław Lem's Fiasco is also about first contact SETI mission and has a priest (although Dominican) as one of prominent secondary characters.
- Michel Faber's The Book of Strange New Things is a novel about a pastor sent as a missionary to an alien species.
- Progressive/symphonic rock band Metaphor has produced a concept album/rock opera based on The Sparrow (with the author's permission). The CD was released in September 2007.

== Publication history ==
- 1996, US, Villard ISBN 978-0-679-45150-1, Pub date 9 September 1996, Hardcover
- 1996, US, Brilliance Corp ISBN 978-1-56100-708-0, Pub date 1 October 1996, Audio Cassette
- 1997, US, Ballantine Books ISBN 978-0-449-91255-3, Pub date 8 September 1997, Paperback
- 1997, UK, Black Swan ISBN 978-0-552-99777-5, Pub date 1 November 1997, Paperback
- 2008, US, Brilliance Audio ISBN 978-1-4233-5628-8, Pub date 4 April 2008, Audio CD
