= 12373 Lancearmstrong =

Main-belt asteroid

Discovery
- Discovered by: C. P. de Saint-Aignan
- Discovery site: Palomar Obs.
- Discovery date: 15 May 1994

Designations
- Named after: Lance Armstrong (road racing cyclist)
- Alternative designations: 1994 JE_{9} · 1997 AP_{22}
- Minor planet category: main-belt · (inner); Vestian

Orbital characteristics
- Epoch 4 September 2017 (JD 2458000.5)
- Uncertainty parameter 0
- Observation arc: 23.05 yr (8,419 days)
- Aphelion: 2.7308 AU
- Perihelion: 2.1698 AU
- Semi-major axis: 2.4503 AU
- Eccentricity: 0.1145
- Orbital period (sidereal): 3.84 yr (1,401 days)
- Mean anomaly: 354.34°
- Mean motion: 0° 15^{m} 25.2^{s} / day
- Inclination: 6.7515°
- Longitude of ascending node: 118.50°
- Argument of perihelion: 149.65°

Physical characteristics
- Dimensions: 3.291±0.264; 5±1 km (est. at 0.20)
- Geometric albedo: 0.449±0.089
- Absolute magnitude (H): 14.2

12373 Lancearmstrong, provisional designation 1994 JE_{9}, is a bright Vestian asteroid from the inner regions of the asteroid belt, approximately 5 kilometers (3.1 miles) in diameter. It was discovered on 15 May 1994, by American astronomer and software engineer Charles de Saint-Aignan after examining films taken at Palomar Observatory, California, and named after American cyclist Lance Armstrong.

== Orbital and physical characteristics ==
Lancearmstrong: orbital diagram

The asteroid orbits the Sun in the inner main-belt at a distance of 2.2–2.7 AU once every 3 years and 10 months (1,401 days). Its orbit has an eccentricity of 0.11 and an inclination of 7° with respect to the ecliptic. The body's observation arc begins in 1994, as no precoveries were taken prior to its discovery.

Based on an absolute magnitude of 14.2 and an assumed albedo of 0.20, which is typical for bodies with a silicaceous composition, Lancearmstrong measures between 4 and 6 kilometers in diameter.

According to the survey carried out by NASA's Wide-field Infrared Survey Explorer with its subsequent NEOWISE mission, the asteroid measures 3.3 kilometers in diameter due to an unusually high albedo of 0.449. As of 2016, its composition, shape and rotation period and shape remains unknown.

== Naming ==
This minor planet was named after American Lance Armstrong (born 1971), former professional road racing cyclist. Despite being diagnosed with metastatic testicular cancer, he recovered and returned to cycling. At the time this minor planet was named, he had won the Tour de France three times and encouraged athletes and cancer survivors worldwide. The approved naming citation was published by the Minor Planet Center on 1 November 2001 (M.P.C. 43762). In 2012, Armstrong was stripped of his Tour de France victories after a doping scandal.

== See also ==
- List of minor planets named after people
- List of exceptional asteroids
- Meanings of asteroid names – Lancearmstrong
