= Cora Crane =

American businesswoman, nightclub owner, writer and journalist (1868-1910)

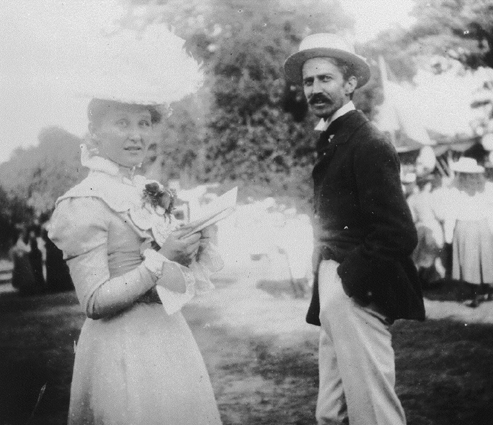
- Stephen Crane and a woman thought by some researchers to be Cora Crane, 1899
- Born: 12 July 1868; Boston, Massachusetts
- Died: 5 September 1910 (aged 42); Jacksonville Beach, Florida
- Occupations: American businesswoman, nightclub and bordello owner

Cora Crane, born Cora Ethel Eaton Howarth (July 12, 1868 – September 5, 1910) was an American businesswoman, nightclub and bordello owner, writer and journalist. She is best known as the common-law wife of writer Stephen Crane from 1896 to his death in 1900, and took his name although they never married. She was still legally married to her second husband, Captain Donald William Stewart, a British military officer who had served in India and then as British Resident of the Gold Coast, where he was a key figure in the War of the Golden Stool (1900) between the British and the Ashanti Empire in present-day Ghana.

Crane accompanied Stephen Crane to Greece during the Greco-Turkish War (1897), where she was a war correspondent. She is sometimes reported as the first recognized woman war correspondent, but Jane Cazneau covered the Mexican–American War fifty years earlier. After Crane's death, she returned to Jacksonville, Florida, in 1901, where she developed several properties as bordellos, including the luxurious Palmetto Lodge at Pablo Beach; she had financial interests in bars and related venues. In this same period, she regularly contributed articles to such national magazines as Smart Set and Harper's Weekly.

== Early life ==
Cora Ethel Eaton Howarth was born July 12, 1868, in Boston, Massachusetts, to John Howarth, a portrait painter, and Elizabeth Holder. According to the 1870 United States census, the family was living in San Francisco when she was five years old. She was educated to lead a life of refinement, socialized with the well-educated of Boston, and gained recognition for her talent in short story writing.

She moved to New York City, where she had a series of adventures and misadventures. To gain freedom from the restriction that unmarried women required chaperones to go out in society, Cora married her first husband, Thomas Vinton Murphy. He was the son of Thomas Murphy, the former Collector of the Port of New York and a New York state politician. The younger Murphy and Cora went into business, running munitions and a gambling house.

Two years later she married Captain Donald William Stewart, the son of Sir Donald Martin Stewart, 1st Baronet, commander in Chief of India for Queen Victoria. She moved with him to England, where she cut a social swath after the fashion of fellow American Jennie Jerome, who had married Lord Randolph Churchill in 1874. However, when Captain Stewart was assigned to India, Cora elected to stay in England as what was called an "Empire widow."

After living briefly at the country family estate, Cora had moved to London and entered its society. She soon became involved in a highly publicized affair with the heir of the Chase Bank fortune. She later resettled in Jacksonville, Florida, where she became involved with the writer Stephen Crane. Stewart hated Cora for not remaining faithful to him in his absence. He felt she had made a fool of him, when in terms of his society, he had married below his station with her. During the later years of their marriage (she left him before 1895), he was assigned to the Gold Coast as the British Resident, where he was deeply involved in the colonial War of the Golden Stool (1900) against the Ashanti people.

Cora traveled with her lover on his yacht to the United States; following an argument while they were anchored off Jacksonville, Florida, she swam ashore in her shift. She started from scratch in the city. Calling herself "Cora Taylor," she bought the Hotel de Dreme from its proprietor, Ethel Dreme, and remodeled it as a popular "nightclub" called the Hotel de Dream. Technically the elegant establishment was not a brothel because, although a man could meet a woman there for a sexual assignation, they had to go elsewhere to conduct "business".

== Life with Stephen Crane ==
Cora, still legally Mrs. Stewart, met writer and journalist Stephen Crane in 1896. They soon became lovers. He was in Jacksonville en route to Cuba to cover the Spanish–American War. He stayed in the St. James Hotel. He was known for his popular book, The Red Badge of Courage (1895), a novel set during the American Civil War. The couple could not marry, but Cora took his surname, and they were together until his death from tuberculosis in 1900.

Cora Crane became known as the first female war correspondent when she traveled with Stephen to Greece to cover the Greco-Turkish War (1897) for the New York press. She used the pen name of "Imogene Carter." After the war, the Cranes settled in England, socialized with the literary elite and joined the Fabian Society. While there, they camouflaged their limited finances and entertained lavishly. They leased Ravensbrook, a villa in Oxted.

Cora Crane was notorious in society due to her status as Mrs. Stewart. She also became involved in a scandal in 1898–1899 involving the wife and mistress of American author and journalist Harold Frederic. Married with five children, he had a second family and household in London with Kate Lyon, with whom he had three children. When Frederic, a novelist and The New York Times correspondent, died of a stroke in 1898, his wife had Lyon arrested and jailed for manslaughter. A Christian Scientist, Lyon was said to have called on a faith healer after Frederic had his stroke.

Also at issue (and perhaps more important) were the potential royalties from Frederic's novel, The Market Place (1899), which became a posthumous bestseller. Victorian society split, with some publishers' wives supporting Grace Frederic, and conducting press campaigns to raise funds for her children. Cora Crane cared for Lyon's illegitimate children at her home of Brede Place while their mother was in jail. During this period, she conducted her own campaign to raise funds for their care. Lyon was acquitted at trial of the charges. Joseph Conrad said that Cora was "the only Christian in sight" because of her actions during these events.

Suffering from declining health, Stephen Crane visited Badenweiler, Germany, a health spa on the edge of the Black Forest. He died there on June 5, 1900, of tuberculosis; he was 28. In his will, he left everything to Cora. She arranged for the return of his body to the United States and burial in his home state of New Jersey.

== Return to Jacksonville ==
In 1901 Cora returned to Jacksonville while much of downtown was still in ruins following the Great Fire. The Ward Street Bordello District, in the LaVilla neighborhood, had escaped the general destruction. She found financing and built what became a signature brothel in the LaVilla District. Called "The Court", it was located at the Southwest corner of Ward (now Houston) and Davis streets. The two-story brick building had 14 bedrooms (parlour rooms), a ballroom, kitchens, and dining room, and an annex with eight bedrooms. Business boomed and within short order, Cora expanded to take on partial ownership in several other "resorts." She also built a grand tropical bordello at Pablo Beach, which she called the Palmetto Lodge.

On June 1, 1905, Cora married Hammond P. McNeill. The 25-year-old man was the son of a prominent South Carolina family. He was working for her as the manager of The Annex, a bar she partially owned at the Everett Hotel. (He was a nephew of Anna McNeill Whistler, the mother of artist James Whistler and subject of his noted painting Arrangement in Grey and Black No. 1 (known as Whistler's Mother.) When Cora was at a picnic with a man McNeill suspected as her lover, he shot and killed him. McNeill was acquitted because the laws of the time recognized husbands' rights, and the all-male jury supported his action. The couple were divorced shortly after he was acquitted; the divorce decree forbade her using the name McNeill. She reverted to using Crane.

Crane became a regular contributor of articles to leading publications of the country, including Smart Set and Harpers Weekly. Toward the end of her career, she became restless and took on a bohemian lifestyle. She had been planning to return to Europe for its atmosphere and take up her writing again there.

For the last three years of her life, she spent much of her time in Pablo Beach, Florida (now Jacksonville Beach), maintaining a residence in the city of Jacksonville as well. In 1910, she suffered a stroke and later that year she suffered from heat stroke soon after helping push a stranded car out of the sand. She returned to her house and died there on September 5, 1910, aged 42. She is buried in the Evergreen Cemetery in Jacksonville, Florida.

== Legacy ==
- Columbia University purchased much of the Stephen Crane papers from Cora Crane's estate. The Crane Collection is one of the largest in the nation of his materials.
- Columbia University had an exhibit: 'The Tall Swift Shadow of a Ship at Night': Stephen and Cora Crane, November 2, 1995 through February 16, 1996.
