= Black Easter =

1968 novel by James Blish

- Hardcover first edition
- Author: James Blish
- Cover artist: Judith Anne Lawrence
- Language: English
- Series: After Such Knowledge trilogy
- Genre: Fantasy
- Publisher: Faber and Faber (UK); Doubleday (US)
- Publication date: 1968
- Publication place: United Kingdom
- Media type: Print (Hardcover & Paperback)
- Pages: 165
- ISBN: 0-571-08699-3
- OCLC: 1562480
- Preceded by: A Case of Conscience; Doctor Mirabilis
- Followed by: The Day After Judgment

Black Easter is a fantasy novel by American writer James Blish, in which an arms dealer hires a black magician to unleash all the demons of Hell on Earth for a single day. The novel initially depicts the assassination of a Governor of California (a fictionalized version of Ronald Reagan) by a black magician working as a contract killer. The same magician is then hired to release every demon in Hell for a brief time period. However, the demons cannot actually be returned to Hell by the end of the novel. Their traditional opponent, God, has already retired and nobody else can compel them to return to Hell.

It was first published in 1968. The sequel is The Day After Judgment. Together, those two novellas form the third part of the thematic After Such Knowledge trilogy (the title is from a line of T. S. Eliot's Gerontion: "After such knowledge, what forgiveness?") with A Case of Conscience and Doctor Mirabilis. Blish has stated that it was only after completing Black Easter that he realized that the works formed a trilogy.

A shorter version of Black Easter was serialized as Faust Aleph-Null in If magazine, August–October 1967; the book edition retains the phrase as its subtitle. Black Easter and its sequel were later published as a single volume under the title Black Easter and The Day After Judgment (1980); a 1990 edition from Baen Books was renamed The Devil's Day.

== Background ==
Black Easter and The Day After Judgment deal with what sorcery would be like if it existed, and if the ritual magic for summoning demons as described in grimoires actually worked. Its background was based closely on the writings of practising magicians working in the Christian tradition from the 13th to the 18th centuries.

== Plot summary ==
In the first book, a wealthy arms manufacturer, Dr. Baines, comes to a black magician, Theron Ware. Initially Baines tests Ware's credentials by asking for two people to be killed, first the Governor of California, Rogan (Reagan was governor at the time of writing) and then a rival physicist. When this is accomplished to Baines' satisfaction, Baines reveals his real plan: he wishes to release all the demons from Hell on Earth for one night to see what might happen. The book includes a long sequence of the summoning ritual and the demons as they appear. Tension between white magicians (who appear to have a line of communications with the unfallen host in Heaven) and Ware is woven over the terms and conditions of a magical covenant that is designed to provide for observers and limitations. Black Easter ends with Baphomet announcing to the participants that the demons cannot be compelled to return to Hell: the war is over and God is dead.

The Day After Judgment, which follows in the series, develops and extends the characters from the first book. It suggests that God might not be dead, or that demons might not be inherently self-destructive, as something appears to be restraining the actions of the demons upon Earth. In a lengthy Miltonian speech at the end of the novel, Satan Mekratrig explains that, compared to humans, demons are good, and that if perhaps God has withdrawn Himself, then Satan beyond all others was qualified to take His place and, if anything, would be a juster god. However, the defeat of Satan is complete. He cannot take up this throne and must hand the burning keys to man, as this is the most fell of all his fell damnations. He never wanted to be God at all, and so having won all, has he lost all.

== Reception ==
Algis Budrys was dissatisfied with Black Easter, declaring it, despite Blish's outstanding craftsmanship, to be "an unreasonably inflated short story." He particularly faulted the novel's abrupt conclusion, characterizing Blish as an author "genuinely concerned with religion, not with trick endings."

== Character names ==
Theron Ware is named for the titular character of Harold Frederic's 1896 novel The Damnation of Theron Ware, a Methodist minister who overestimates his intellectual abilities and social skills, loses his faith and his friends, and emigrates from his native rural New York to start a new life in Seattle.

Many of the white magician monks at Monte Albano are named after Blish's fellow science fiction writers:

- Anthony Boucher: "Father Boucher, who had commerce with some intellect of the recent past that was neither a mortal nor a Power, a commerce bearing all the earmarks of necromancy and yet was not;"
- Jack Vance: "Father Vance, in whose mind floated visions of magics that would not be comprehensible, let alone practicable, for millions of years to come;"
- Robert Anson Heinlein: "Father Anson, a brusque engineer type who specialized in unclouding the minds of politicians;"
- Roger Zelazny and/or Samuel Delany: "Father Selahny, a terrifying kabbalist who spoke in parables and of whom it was said that no one since Leviathan had understood his counsel;"
- J. Michael Rosenblum: "Father Rosenblum, a dour, bear-like man who tersely predicted disasters and was always right about them;"
- James Blish: "Father Atheling, a wall-eyed grimorian who saw portents in parts of speech and lectured everyone in a tense nasal voice until the Director had to exile him to the library except when business was being conducted;"

(Black Easter, pp. 119–120)

Baines has two employees, names also possibly based on science fiction writers:

- Jack Ginsburg - secretary
- Doctor Adolph Hess - Science Officer

A reviewer of Black Easter said, of the book's California governor "Rogan": "A Californian governor named Rogan, which must be an allusion to [Ronald] Reagan", who was then Governor of California. Other people have suggested that Baines, the biggest arms dealer in the world in the book, is an allusion to then-U.S. President Lyndon Baines Johnson, including Ted White in his review of the book. Blish replied to White's review, but did not comment on that claim.

== Grimoires and assorted texts mentioned ==
Blish says in his foreword that all of the magical works and quotations mentioned in the text actually exist, as do the magical symbols reproduced, and "there are no Necronomicons or other such invented works". This is true insofar as Blish did not invent any of the works himself. The Book of the Sayings of Tsiang Samdup was invented by Talbot Mundy; it is the supposed source of the quotations at the beginning of each chapter in his novels Om — The Secret of Ahbor Valley (1924) and The Devil's Guard (1925).

- Ars Magna by Ramon Llull
- The Nullity of Magic by Roger Bacon (this is a reference to Epistola de Secretis Operibus Artis et Naturae, et de Nullitate Magiae, which has been attributed to Bacon)
- The Book of Ceremonial Magic by A. E. Waite
- Enchiridion of Pope Leo III (also known as the Grimoire of Pope Leo)
- The Effects of Atomic Weapons, compiled and edited by Samuel Glasstone and Philip J. Dolan
- The Book of the Sayings of Tsiang Samdup
- Grand Grimoire
- Grimorium Verum
- Clavicula Salomonis
- Lemegeton
- The Screwtape Letters by C.S. Lewis
