= In the Valley =

1890 novel by Harold Frederic

In the Valley is an 1890 historical novel by American novelist Harold Frederic. It is set in the United States in the Mohawk Valley and in Albany, New York, from 1757 to 1777.

== Plot ==
A Mohawk Valley Dutchman finds himself pitted against a brilliant villain, a British officer, who for a time wins the affections of the heroine who has been thrown among "Tories" and British but steadfastly loyal to her native colony, though in the end he loses her to the less-worldly though courageous and honorable Douw Mauverensen, who is historian as well as hero of the tale. The climax of the book is the Battle of Oriskany.

The book adheres to the New York tradition, early set down in Irving and Cooper, of respect for Dutch prudence, suspicion of British perfidy and active prejudice against all New Englanders, particularly those from Connecticut. There are also faithful black slaves and ferocious Indians.

== Background ==
Frederic said years of preparation went to the making of the book, which is full of erudition regarding life in the Mohawk Valley and in Albany from 1757 to 1777.

== Evaluation and analysis ==
In the Valley is representative of the historical novels which, during the later years of the 19th century in the United States, contended, for a time successfully, with the prevailing vogue of realism. It accepts conventions of its genre but goes beyond them in respects, for it lacks the customary tinsel of archaisms and pretensions and is not always sentimental. Frederic, later distinguished by his energetic naturalism, was in this romance prophetically spare and terse.

During the time period in question the diverse nationalities of the region were drawing together into a common Americanism. For them it was both a civil and a foreign war; the battle of Oriskany, by checking the British and Indians, not only left the valley in the hands of the colonials but also prevented the junction of St. Leger and Burgoyne and so contributed to the decision reached at Saratoga.

In the Valley, compact and dramatic throughout, comes to its fitting climax with the fight at Oriskany.
