= Doctor Mirabilis (novel) =

1964 novel by James Blish

- Hardcover first edition
- Author: James Blish
- Cover artist: Roger Bacon
- Language: English
- Series: After Such Knowledge trilogy
- Genre: Historical novel
- Published: 1964 (Faber and Faber)
- Preceded by: A Case of Conscience
- Followed by: Black Easter; The Day After Judgment

Doctor Mirabilis is a historical novel written in 1964 by American writer James Blish.

This is the second book in Blish's quasi-religious trilogy After Such Knowledge (1958-1971). The historical novel recounts of the life of the 13th-century English Franciscan Roger Bacon and his struggle to develop a 'Universal Science'. Though thoroughly researched, with a host of references, including extensive use of Bacon's own writings, frequently in the original Latin, the book is written in the style of a novel, and Blish himself referred to it as 'fiction' or 'a vision'.

Blish's view of Bacon is uncompromising that he was the first scientist, and he provides a postscript to the novel in which he sets forth these views. Central to his depiction of Roger Bacon is that "He was not an inventor, an Edison or Luther Burbank, holding up a test tube with a shout of Eureka!" He was instead a theoretical scientist probing fundamental realities, and his visions of modern technology were just by-products of "...the way he normally thought – the theory of theories as tools..." Blish indicates where Bacon's writings, for example, consider Newtonian metrical frameworks for space, then reject these for something which reads remarkably like Einsteinian relativity, and all "...breathtakingly without pause or hiccup, breezily moving without any recourse through over 800 years of physics".
