= Get Out of My Sky =

1957 novel by James Blish

- Get Out of My Sky was serialized in Astounding.
- Author: James Blish
- Language: English
- Genre: Science fiction
- Publisher: Astounding Science Fiction
- Publication date: 1957
- Publication place: United States
- Media type: Print (magazine)

"Get Out of My Sky" is a 1957 science fiction novella by American writer James Blish. It was first published by the magazine Astounding Science Fiction in January and February 1957. The story is about two planets, Home and Rathe, whose inhabitants are in contact, and the consequences of this contact, for individuals and societies, are explored.

== Plot background ==
Rathe and Home are members of a double planet system where each keeps the same face towards the other. Since the side of Home that faces Rathe is entirely ocean, Rathe was unknown to the population of Home before an expedition to the middle of the far ocean to observe an eclipse. Having discovered Rathe, and realizing that it is inhabited, the people of Home are consumed by xenophobia. The slogan "Get out of my sky!" has been taken up by demagogues. The people of Rathe knew of Home from ancient times, but did not know it was inhabited. The inhabited side of Home was discovered by an expedition to a third planet. Now they too are afraid of the unknown intentions of their neighbors.

== Plot ==
The planet of Rathe and Home are locked into a deadly nuclear arms-race, each possessing weapons ready to launch a fiery consummation of the policy of Mutual Assured Destruction. Although satellite images show that Rathe possess only atomic (fission) weapons, less powerful than Home's thermonuclear arsenal, there is still enough on each planet to totally destroy the other.

In a huge tent, a man almost dances a message out to the assembled masses. He whips up a frenzy of anti-Rathe sentiment, but as the crowd join in, he acts visibly and physically shocked, cowering and shaking. He begs the congregation to listen and to see reason before it is too late...

Both Rathe and Home are deserts - Rathe one of sand, Home one of water - and after a Naval expedition to observe a total solar eclipse (rare in the three-sun system of Rathe and Home) Aidregh - the Minister for the most powerful island nation on Home - is struggling to maintain the balance of power among his fellow ministers and prevent the terrible war that will result if a more xenophobic minister seizes power.

A secret crewed space-flight to a nearby planet of Home shows that Rathe had also visited the planetoid. This Home expedition also shows that Rathe has atomic 'firing plazas' each holding large enough atomic weapons to totally devastate Home. The Home expedition has been in flight for over a year, rushing back because of the importance of this news. As a result, the crew are exhausted. The captain dies suddenly of an embolism brought on by stress, lack of sleep and an overdose of amphetamine.

Unknown to the rest of Home, Aidregh has a microwave video-link to Rathe, which he uses to contact Margent, a Ratheman liaison. Margent and Aidregh discuss the feelings towards the war each planet has, and finally Margent suggests that a Home contingent, including Aidregh, visit Rathe to settle the problem once and for all. The rocket journey is scheduled for a year later.

Dr. Ni (an old friend of Aidregh) and his daughter, Aidregh and his son Aidresne and several other Home-men eventually arrive on Rathe. After being secluded for several days, they are reunited and Margent describes how his planet has 'lost its mind'. Rathe, it seems, is the home of telepathic and psionics that exploit what is known as Voisk forces. The psionic abilities are limited by connections - replacing a circuit-board from a computer will not stop it from working, as long as the board is replaced with a suitably connected schematic diagram. Margent - now revealed to be a title, not a name - is one of several Rathemen in charge (who all look worryingly similar to each other) describes how his world was once much more powerful in psionic powers than now. The war effort, it seems, and the need to think in terms of total destruction of another world, have effectively crippled what psionic ability the Rathemen once had.

To prevent the war, Margent suggests that Aidresne and his betrothed Corlant (who is Dr. Ni's daughter) be taught a psionic 'trick' that allows them to influence others' decisions. Aidregh and Ni strongly oppose this, because of the risks, and Aidregh himself volunteers.

Aidregh is painfully taught the trick of charisma that allows him to psionically project his feelings to others so that they might be influenced by it. Before an assembled audience of Rathemen, and at great risk to his own mind, he attempts this. Succeeding through great difficulty, the Rathemen agree it is time for the people from Home to return and convince their fellows that the war is unwinnable, and that there must be peace.

Aidregh gives a public talk, almost dancing his message. In a huge tent, he almost dances a message out to the assembled Home masses. He whips up a frenzy of anti-Rathe sentiment, but as the crowd join in, he acts visibly and physically shocked, cowering and shaking. Using the Voisk force he has been taught, Aidregh begs the congregation to listen and to see reason before it is too late... There is still time! This is where we and the grass grow up like music...'

== Real-World Context ==
This novella was published during a critical period of the Cold War between the United States and the Soviet Union. The xenophobic mutual hostility felt by the inhabitants of Home and Rathe resembles the ideological and geopolitical struggle for global influence by these two superpowers, and the extreme tensions felt by various characters on each planet may be understood as comment by the author on the social psychology of that era.

A similar state of hostility, portrayed as open warfare between the Inner Planets and the Outer Satellites, is the setting of Alfred Bester's novel The Stars My Destination, published in 1956. Both Bester and Blish depict adversaries technologically capable of destroying each other, societies inhabited by characters who live with the emotional tensions of hatred and fear. Bester's setting emphasizes the separation between the antagonists, while Blish shows the inhabitants of each planet as fixated on the other's proximity.

Other science-fiction novels of the 1950s also employed settings of balanced hostility or warfare between two dominant societies. This pattern is visible in The Big Time, by Fritz Leiber, and Starship Troopers, by Robert Heinlein. Cyril M. Kornbluth wrote Not This August, published in 1955, an alternate history of open combat between the United States and allied Soviet and Chinese Communist forces, with the Communists victorious until developments at the end of the novel offer the unresolved possibilities of American victory or mutual assured destruction.
