= Children of God (novel) =

1998 novel by Mary Doria Russell

- Author: Mary Doria Russell
- Language: English
- Genre: Science fiction novel
- Publisher: Villard
- Publication date: March 24, 1998
- Publication place: United States
- Media type: Print (hardback & paperback)
- Pages: 436
- ISBN: 978-0-679-45635-3
- OCLC: 37725654
- Dewey Decimal: 813/.54 21
- LC Class: PS3568.U76678 C48 1998
- Preceded by: The Sparrow

Children of God is the second book, and the second science fiction novel, written by author Mary Doria Russell. It is the sequel to the novel The Sparrow.

== Plot summary ==
Father Emilio Sandoz is a Jesuit priest who has returned to Earth and is recovering from his experiences on the planet Rakhat (detailed in The Sparrow). He believes himself to be the only survivor of a disastrous mission to Rakhat that led to a massacre of a village of herbivore Runa people by their carnivorous Jana'ata rulers, which in turn sparked a Runa revolution.

This news caused a rift between the Society of Jesus and the rest of the Catholic Church, and the Jesuits are determined to return to Rakhat and help the Runa. Emilio agrees to teach the members of the second Jesuit expedition to speak the Runa and Jana'ata languages, but refuses to accompany them. He falls in love with a divorced mother named Gina and is released from the priesthood, intending to marry her. Gina's ex-husband Carlo, who is working for the Jesuits and the Vatican, kidnaps Emilio and imprisons him on a spaceship bound for Rakhat.

Sofia Mendes Quinn, a member of the first mission to Rakhat, survived being attacked by the Jana'ata in The Sparrow. She was pregnant at the time, and gives birth to a son, Isaac. Sofia supports the Runa in their revolution and becomes a Joan of Arc figure for them.

The Jana'ata merchant Supaari, who also appeared in the first novel, fulfills his goal of marrying and beginning a family. However, he soon realizes that he cannot trust his brother-in-law, the Reshtar (third-born prince) Hlavin Kitheri. Supaari flees the city with his baby daughter Ha'anala. They find sanctuary in the Runa village that he had previously traded with, and where he had befriended the first human landing party.

The Runa have been bred for many centuries as not only servants but food for the Jana'ata, and they are willing to sacrifice themselves to feed Suparri and his child. He refuses their offer and instead joins in their revolution, working as a spy against the other Jana'ata. Sofia educates his daughter Ha'anala alongside her own son Isaac, who is autistic. One day, Isaac runs away. Ha'anala follows him, and they find a group of Jana'ata people living in the N'Jarr Valley and stay with them.

When Emilio Sandoz and the Jesuit mission finally arrive on Rakhat, they find that the Runa revolution has succeeded and most of the Jana'ata have been wiped out. Sofia is still searching for her son Isaac, who is now 40. She learns that he is in the N'Jarr Valley and sends Runa troops there, believing that he is a captive. Isaac has actually remained with Ha'anala in the valley by choice, working on a long-term project using his mother's old computer tablet. The Jana'ata and Runa in the valley are trying to build a new culture that will allow both species to live in peace. Yet the Jana'ata of the valley face starvation, as they will not eat their Runa neighbors but face capture by outside Runa troops if they leave the valley to hunt game animals.

The Jesuit Danny Iron Horse, a Lakota, suggests arranging an Indian reservation-like setup for the remaining Jana'ata on Rakhat. Emilio returns to earth accompanied by a Jana'ata poet. Isaac stays in the valley with Ha'anala's children and continues his mysterious project, creating music by overlapping the genomes of all three sentient species, and finds patterns that he believes are evidence of the existence of God.

== Literary significance and reception ==
A reviewer from the Library Journal said that Children of God "examines the problem of faith under fire with insight and clarity". A Publishers Weekly review determined Russell "uses the entertaining plot to explore sociological, spiritual, and scientific questions. Misunderstandings between cultures and peoples are at the heart of her story".

Reviewing the novel in National Catholic Reporter, novelist Valerie Sayers felt that Children of God focuses on the problem of evil. She was critical of the author's tone but praised her prose style. "The steady rate of shouting and imploring is rough indicator of the melodrama level. The minor characters tend to the stereotype." Finally, she said, "Russell's keen intelligence and scientific knowledge shine through often enough to make Children of God appealing often enough to make me wish she had dispensed with the least satisfying conventions of the genre".

== Awards and nominations ==
- The Sparrow and Children of God together won the 2001 Gaylactic Spectrum Hall of Fame.
- Nominee for the 1999 Hugo Award
- On the Long List for the 1999 James Tiptree Jr. Award
- Nominee for the 2000 British Science Fiction Association Awards

== Publication history ==
- 1998, USA, Villard ISBN 978-0-679-45635-3, Pub Date 24 March 1998, Hardcover
- 1999, USA, Ballantine Books, ISBN 978-0-449-00483-8, Pub Date 2 February 1999, Paperback
- 1999, UK, Black Swan, ISBN 978-0-552-99811-6, Pub Date Feb 1999, Paperback

== Sources, references, external links, quotations ==
- Infinity Plus Interview with Mary Doria Russell where she discusses Children of God.
- Mary Doria Russell personal website.
