= Mary Doria Russell =

American novelist (born 1950)

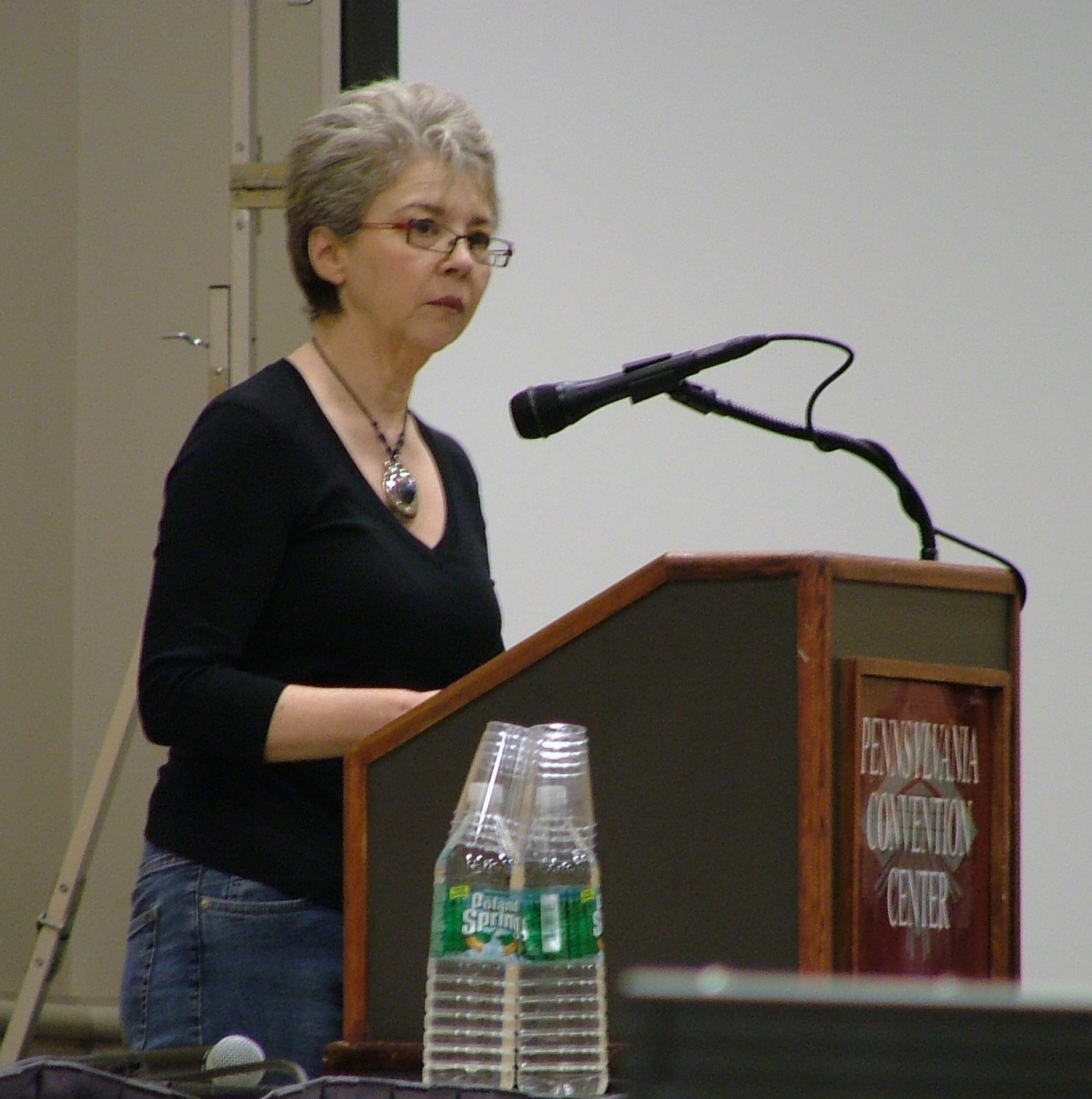
- Russell at the annual conference of the American Library Association, January 2008
- Born: August 19, 1950 (age 76); Elmhurst, Illinois, U.S.
- Education: University of Michigan (PhD)
- Occupation: Novelist
- Writing career
- Period: 1995–present
- Genres: Science fiction, historical fiction
- Notable works: The Sparrow; Children of God; Doc; Epitaph
- Notable awards: James Tiptree, Jr. Award, BSFA Award, Arthur C. Clarke Award, John W. Campbell Award for Best New Writer, Kurd Lasswitz Preis, ALA Top Pick in Historical Fiction, Ohioana Fiction Prize
- Website: marydoriarussell.net

Mary Doria Russell (born August 19, 1950) is a retired American novelist. She is best known for her work, The Sparrow, and its sequel, Children of God, about a Jesuit priest who travels to a faraway planet.

== Personal life ==
Russell was born in Elmhurst, Illinois, outside of Chicago. Her parents were in the military, with her mother a Navy nurse, and her father a drill sergeant in the Marine Corps. She graduated from Glenbard East High School in Lombard, Illinois. She met her husband, Don, there, as a freshman. Russell has one son, Daniel, with her husband. Daniel was born in Croatia in 1985.

=== Religion ===
Russell was raised Catholic and has Italian-Catholic heritage. After experimenting with atheism for 20 years, she later converted to Judaism in 1993 after becoming a mother. On her ultimate decision to leave the church, Russell has said, "I simply do not believe in the divinity of Jesus. Eventually, I found a spiritual home in the religion Jesus practiced."

Russell celebrates Jewish holidays like Passover and Hanukkah. She keeps a kosher diet.

== Academic career ==
Before writing her novels, Russell studied as a paleoanthropologist. She received her BA in cultural anthropology. Later, she attended graduate school, receiving a MA in social anthropology and a PhD in biological anthropology in 1983 from the University of Michigan. Her PhD dissertation was on Neanderthal burial practices and biology. Russell has published scientific articles on topics like cannibalism.

As an anthropologist, she has worked at Case Western Reserve University and as a forensic consultant for law enforcement agencies. At Case Western, she completed a three year fellowship in bone biology. She also taught anatomy classes. After Case Western cut her department, Russell went to work for Picker International, where she wrote manuals for Magnetic Resonance scanners. She worked as a freelance technical writer for five years.

== Writing career ==
Russell began writing for fun in the 1990s. She was influenced by Scottish writer Dorothy Dunnett. When questioned about who she writes for, she has said:

I write to understand people and events that puzzle me; my novels appeal to readers who have the same hunger to go below the surface of things. This makes me hard to categorize as a novelist, but it also keeps my books in print, year after year.

=== Sparrow series ===
Russell's first two novels, The Sparrow and its sequel Children of God (1998)—sometimes called the Sparrow series or Emilio Sandoz sequence—(Random House Villard in 1996 and 1998) are speculative fiction novels focused on the religious and psychological implications of first contact with aliens. Both explore the problem of evil (theodicy) and how to reconcile a benevolent, omniscient, all-powerful deity with lives filled with undeserved suffering.

The Sparrow won the Arthur C. Clarke, BSFA, and Tiptree annual science fiction book awards (below), and it was the basis for Russell winning the John W. Campbell Award for Best New Writer in 1998.

For The Encyclopedia of Science Fiction, chief editor John Clute calls Russell an "author who established a strong reputation for cognitive subtlety and narrative power in her brief [science fiction] career; after the Emilio Sandoz sequence ... she turned her interest to other fields."

=== Other novels ===
The rest of Russell's novels have been categorized as historical novels, although she draws from a variety of genres when telling these stories.

A Thread of Grace (Random House, 2005) is a World War II thriller set in Northern Italy and features both the Italian resistance movement and the plight of Jewish refugees escaping Nazi persecution throughout Europe. Much of the story is based on accounts by survivors from the period, when many Italian citizens allowed Jews to seek safe harbor in their farmlands, cities, and ports. (Russell herself is of Italian heritage and is a convert to Judaism.)

Dreamers of the Day (Random House, 2008) is a historical romance set in the Midwestern United States and the Middle East during the aftermath of the First World War and the Great Influenza. It focuses on the 1921 Cairo Conference, when Winston Churchill, T. E. Lawrence, Gertrude Bell and a group of British oilmen invented the modern Middle East, thus setting the region up for a hundred years of war.

Doc (Random House 2011) is a murder mystery as well as a compassionate portrait of the notorious "gambler and gunman" known as Doc Holliday. Doc is set in Dodge City, Kansas, during 1878, the last year that Dr. John Henry Holliday's tuberculosis was in check long enough for him to practice dentistry. It was the American Library Association's Top Pick in Historical Fiction as well as the Kansas State Library's Notable Novel and the Great Lakes Great Reads pick.

Epitaph (Ecco/HarperCollins, 2015) picks up where Doc left off, following Holliday and the Earp brothers to Tombstone, Arizona, and traces the political and social roots of the infamous Gunfight at the O.K. Corral, as well as the making of the mythology that surrounds it. While researching the book, the 60-year-old Russell rode 58 miles on horseback through the mountains surrounding Tombstone, retracing the Earp Vendetta Ride. The novel was called the best ever written on the subject by Earp biographer Allen Barra and was recognized by True West Magazine as the Best Historical Western of 2015. The Ohioana Library Foundation awarded it the Best Fiction Prize of 2016; it also won the Ohioana Readers Choice Award for the year.

The Women of the Copper Country (Atria Books, 2019) is a novel about the Copper Country strike of 1913–1914, the first unionized strike against all the copper mines in the Copper Country of Michigan's Upper Peninsula. The central character, "Big Annie" Clements, is based on "America's Joan of Arc," Anna Clemenc, who founded the Women's Auxiliary of the Western Federation of Miners and proudly carried the flag in many marches against the Calumet and Hecla Mining Company. The book received a Michigan Notable Book Award for 2020 from the Library of Michigan.

Russell is active on the lecture circuit, speaking at colleges, universities and libraries.

== Books ==
- The Sparrow (Villard, 1996; Ballantine, 1997)
- Children of God (Villard, 1998; Ballantine, 1999)
- A Thread of Grace (Random House, 2005; Ballantine, 2006)
- Dreamers of the Day (Random House, 2008; Ballantine 2009)
- Doc (Random House 2011; Ballantine, 2012)
- Epitaph: A Novel of the O.K. Corral (Ecco/HarperCollins, 2015 hc, 2016 tradepaper)
- The Women of the Copper Country: A Novel (Atria Books, 2019 hc, 2020 tradepaper)

== Awards ==
- James Tiptree, Jr. Award, 1997, The Sparrow
- Arthur C. Clarke Award, 1998, The Sparrow
- BSFA Award for Best Novel, 1998, The Sparrow (UK edition: Transworld Publishers Black Swan, 1997)
- John W. Campbell Award for Best New Writer, 1998, The Sparrow
- Cleveland Arts Prize in Literature, 1998
- Gaylactic Spectrum Hall of Fame Award, 2001, The Sparrow and Children of God
- Kurd Lasswitz Preis (Germany), best foreign novel, 2001, The Sparrow
