= James Blish =

American science fiction and fantasy author (1921–1975)

- Born: James Benjamin Blish; May 23, 1921; East Orange, New Jersey, United States
- Died: July 30, 1975 (aged 54); Henley-on-Thames, United Kingdom
- Education: Rutgers University (BS); Columbia University (incompl.)
- Occupations: Writer, Literary critic
- Spouses: Virginia Kidd (m. 1947–1963); J. A. Lawrence (m. 1964)
- Children: 3
- Writing career
- Pen name: William Atheling Jr.; Donald Laverty; John MacDougal; Arthur Lloyd Merlyn
- Language: English
- Years active: 1940–1975
- Period: 1940–1975
- Genres: Science fiction, Fantasy
- Website: jamesblish.com

James Benjamin Blish (May 23, 1921 – July 30, 1975) was an American science fiction and fantasy writer. He is best known for his Cities in Flight novels and his series of Star Trek novelizations written with his wife, J. A. Lawrence. His novel A Case of Conscience won the Hugo Award. He is credited with creating the term "gas giant" to refer to large planetary bodies.

His first published stories appeared in Super Science Stories and Amazing Stories.

Blish wrote literary criticism of science fiction using the pen name William Atheling Jr. His other pen names included Donald Laverty, John MacDougal, and Arthur Lloyd Merlyn.

== Life ==
Blish was born on May 23, 1921, at East Orange, New Jersey. While in high school, Blish self-published a fanzine, called The Planeteer, using a hectograph. The fanzine ran for six issues.

Blish was a member of the Futurians.

Blish attended meetings of the Futurian Science Fiction Society in New York City during this period. Futurian members Damon Knight and Cyril M. Kornbluth became close friends. However, Blish's relationships with other members were often bitter. A personal target was fellow member Judith Merril, with whom he would debate politics. Merril would frequently dismiss Blish's self-description of being a "book fascist". She wrote in Better to Have Loved (2002), "Of course [Blish] was not fascist, antisemitic, or any of those terrible things, but every time he used the phrase, I saw red."

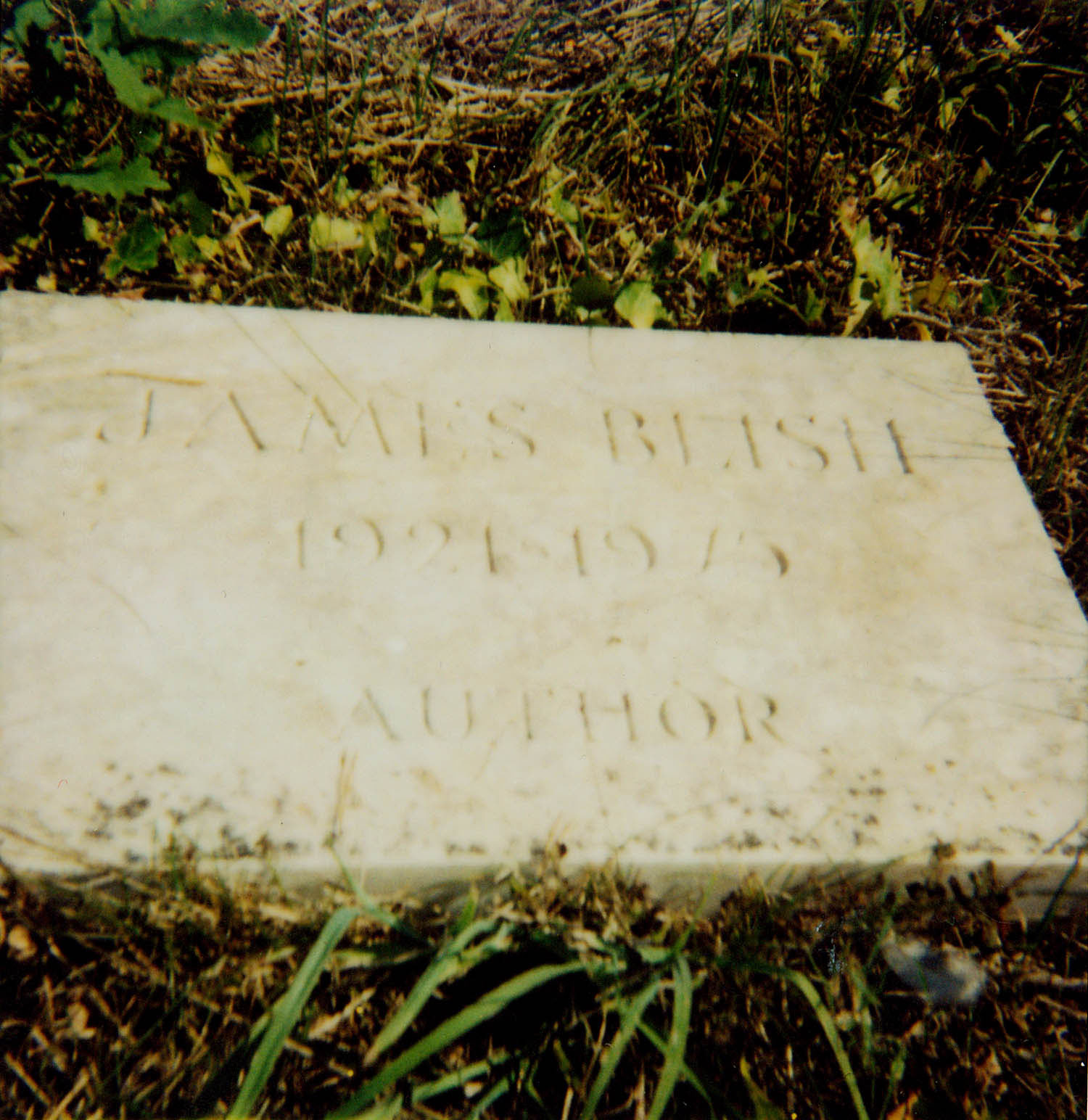
James Blish's grave marker.

Blish studied microbiology at Rutgers University, graduating in 1942. He was drafted into Army service, and he served briefly as a medical laboratory technician. The United States Army discharged him for refusing orders to clean a grease trap in 1944. Following discharge, Blish entered Columbia University as a master's student of zoology. He did not complete the program, opting to write fiction full-time.

In 1947, he married Virginia Kidd, a fellow Futurian. They divorced in 1963. Blish then married artist J. A. Lawrence in 1964, moving to England that same year.

From 1962 to 1968, Blish worked for the Tobacco Institute as a writer and critic. Much of his work for the institute went uncredited.

Blish died on July 30, 1975, from complications related to lung cancer. He was buried in Holywell Cemetery, Oxford.

The Bodleian Library at Oxford is the custodian of Blish's papers. The library also has a complete catalog of Blish's published works.

== Career ==
Throughout the 1940s, Blish published most of his stories in the few pulp magazines still in circulation. His first story was sold to fellow Futurian Frederik Pohl for Super Science Stories (1940), called "Emergency Refueling". Other stories were published intermittently, but with little circulation. Blish's "Chaos, Co-Ordinated", co-written with Robert A. W. Lowndes, was sold to Astounding Science Fiction, appearing in the October 1946 issue, earning Blish national circulation for the first time.

=== Pantropy (1942–1956) ===
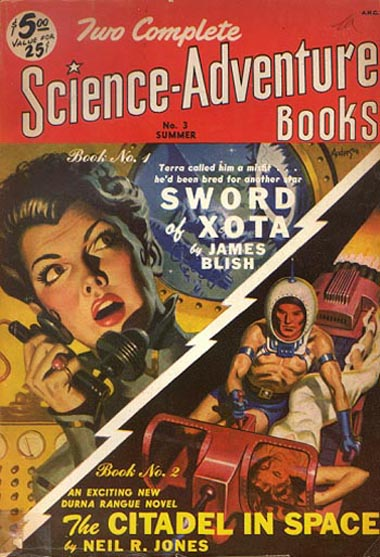
Blish's The Warriors of Day was originally published in Two Complete Science-Adventure Books in 1951 as "Sword of Xota"

Blish was what Andrew Liptack called a "practical writer". He would revisit, revise, and often expand on previously written stories. An example is "Sunken Universe" published in Super Science Stories in 1942. The story reappeared in Galaxy Science Fiction as "Surface Tension", in an altered form in 1952. The premise emphasized Blish's understanding of microbiology, and featured microscopic humans engineered to live on a hostile planet's shallow pools of water. The story proved to be among Blish's more popular and was anthologized in the first volume of Robert Silverberg's The Science Fiction Hall of Fame. It was also anthologized in The Big Book of Science Fiction (2016), edited by Ann and Jeff VanderMeer.

The idea of human colonists engineered to thrive in alien environments - for which Blish coined the term "pantropy" - continued in "The Thing in the Attic" in 1954, and "Watershed" the following year. The fourth entry, "A Time to Survive", was published by The Magazine of Fantasy & Science Fiction in 1957. The stories were collected, edited together, and published as the fix-up The Seedling Stars (1956), by Gnome Press. John Clute said all of Blish's "deeply felt work" explored "confronting the Faustian (or Frankensteinian) man".

=== Cities in Flight (1950–1958) ===
The Encyclopedia of Science Fiction asserts that not until the 1950s, and the Okie sequence of stories beginning their run, "did it become clear [Blish] would become a [science fiction] writer of unusual depth". The stories were loosely based on the Okie migration following the Dust Bowl of the 1930s, and were influenced by Oswald Spengler's two-part Der Untergang des Abendlandes (The Decline of the West).

The stories detail the life of the Okies, humans who migrate throughout space looking for work in vast city-ships, powered by spindizzies, a type of anti-gravity engine. The premise and plot reflected Blish's feelings on the state of western civilization, and his personal politics. The first two stories, "Okie", and "Bindlestiff", were published in 1950, by Astounding. "Sargasso of Lost Cities" appeared in Two Complete Science-Adventure Books in April 1953. "Earthman, Come Home" followed a few months later, published by Astounding. In 1955, Blish collected the four stories together into an omnibus titled Earthman, Come Home, published by Putnam.

More stories followed: In 1956, They Shall Have Stars, which edited together "Bridge" and "At Death's End", and in 1958, Blish published The Triumph of Time. Four years later, he published a new Okies novel, A Life for the Stars. The Okies sequence was edited together and published as Cities In Flight (1970).

Clute notes, "the brilliance of Cities in Flight does not lie in the assemblage of its parts, but in the momentum of the ideas embodied in it (albeit sometimes obscurely)."

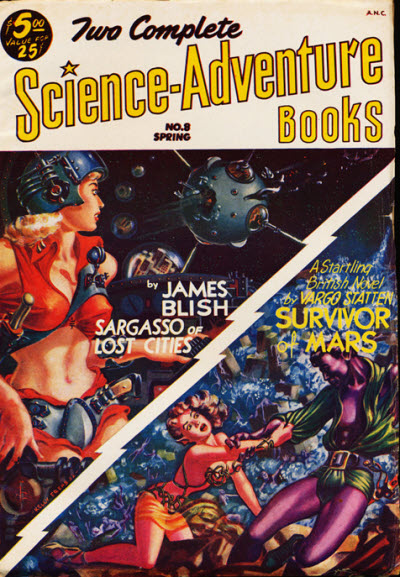
The novella Sargasso of Lost Cities, Blish's third Cities in Flight story, was published in Two Complete Science-Adventure Books in 1953.

=== After Such Knowledge (1958–1971) ===
Blish continued to rework older stories, and did so for one of his best known works, A Case of Conscience (1958). The novel originated as a novella, originally published in an issue of If, in 1953. The story follows a Jesuit priest, Ramon Ruiz-Sanchez, who visits the planet Lithia as a technical member of an expedition. While on the planet they discover a race of bipedal reptilians that have perfected morality in what Ruiz-Sanchez says is "the absence of God", and theological complications ensue. The book is one of the first major works in the genre to explore religion and its implications. It was the first of a series including Doctor Mirabilis (1964) and the two-part story Black Easter (1968) and The Day After Judgment (1971). The latter two were collected as The Devil's Day (1980). An omnibus of all four entries in the series was published by Legend in 1991, titled After Such Knowledge.

A Case of Conscience won the 1959 Hugo Award for Best Novel, and was collected as part of Library of America's omnibus American Science Fiction: Five Classic Novels 1956-1958.

=== Star Trek (1967–1977) ===
Bantam Books commissioned Blish to adapt episodes of Star Trek. The adapted short stories were generally based on draft scripts and contained different plot elements from the aired television episodes.

The stories were collected into twelve volumes and published as a title series of the same name from 1967 to 1977. The adaptations were largely written by Blish; however, his declining health during this period proved problematic. His wife, J. A. Lawrence, wrote a number of installments. Her work remained uncredited until the final volume, Star Trek 12, published in 1977, two years after Blish's death.

The first original novel for adults based on the television series, Spock Must Die! (1970), was also written by Blish, and he planned to release more. According to Lawrence, two episodes featuring popular character Harry Mudd, "I, Mudd" and "Mudd's Women", were held back by Blish for adaptation to be included in the follow-up to Spock Must Die!. However, Blish died before a novel could be completed. Lawrence did eventually adapt the two episodes, as Mudd's Angels (1978), which included an original novella The Business, as Usual, During Altercations by Lawrence. In her introduction to Star Trek 12, Lawrence states that Blish "did indeed write" adaptations of the two episodes. The introduction to Mudd's Angels acknowledges this, stating that Blish left the two stories in various stages of completion and they were finished by Lawrence; Blish does not receive author credit on the book.

Blish credited his financial stability later in life to the Star Trek commission and the advance he received for Spock Must Die!.

== Literary criticism and legacy ==
Blish was among the first literary critics of science fiction, and he judged works in the genre by the standards applied to "serious" literature. He took to task his fellow authors for deficiencies, such as bad grammar and a misunderstanding of scientific concepts, and the magazine editors who accepted and published such material without editorial intervention. His criticism was published in "fanzines" in the 1950s under the pseudonym William Atheling Jr. An admirer of Ezra Pound, Blish adopted the same pseudonym the poet used for his music criticism.

The essays were collected in The Issue at Hand (1964) and More Issues at Hand (1970). Reviewing The Issue at Hand, Algis Budrys said that Atheling had, along with Damon Knight, "transformed the reviewer's trade in this field". He described the persona of Atheling as "acidulous, assertive, categorical, conscientious and occasionally idiosyncratic".

Blish was a fan of the works of James Branch Cabell, and for a time edited Kalki, the journal of the Cabell Society.

In his works of science fiction, Blish developed many ideas and terms which have influenced other writers and on occasion have been adopted more widely, such as faster-than-light communication via the Dirac communicator, introduced in the short story "Beep" (1954). The Dirac is comparable to Ursula K. Le Guin's ansible.

Blish is also credited with coining the term gas giant, first used in the story "Solar Plexus", collected in the anthology Beyond Human Ken, edited by Judith Merril. The story was originally published in 1941, but it did not contain the term. Blish reworked the story, changing the description of a large magnetic field to "a magnetic field of some strength nearby, one that didn't belong to the invisible gas giant revolving half a million miles away".

== Honors, awards and recognition ==
The British Science Fiction Foundation inaugurated the James Blish Award for science fiction criticism in 1977, recognizing Brian W. Aldiss. The Science Fiction and Fantasy Hall of Fame inducted him in 2002.

=== Awards and nominations ===
- 1959 Hugo Award for Best Novel, for A Case of Conscience.
- 1965 Nebula Award nomination for Best Novelette, for "The Shipwrecked Hotel", with Norman L. Knight.
- 1968 Nebula Award nomination for Best Novel, for Black Easter.
- 1970 Hugo Award nomination for Best Novella, for We All Die Naked.
- 1970 Nebula Award nomination for Best Novella, for A Style in Treason.

=== Posthumous Awards and nominations ===
- 2001 [1951] Retro-Hugo Award nomination for Best Novelette, for "Okie".
- 2004 [1954] Retro-Hugo Award for Best Novella, for A Case of Conscience.
- 2004 [1954] Retro-Hugo Award for Best Novelette, for "Earthman, Come Home".

=== Guest of Honor ===
- 1960 Guest of Honor, 18th World Science Fiction Convention.
- 1970 Guest of Honor, Scicon 70.

== Bibliography ==
Blish's work was published by a variety of publishers in the United Kingdom and the United States, often with variations between editions, and with different titles. Blish also expanded and re-published his older work on numerous occasions. His works continued to be re-published after his death.

Very few of Blish's first editions were assigned ISBN numbers.

=== Short fiction and novellas (1935–1986) ===
Novels published in complete form, or serialized, in fiction magazines are included for completeness, and to avoid confusion.

^{β} Novelette, ^{ε} Novella, ^{γ} Novel.

==== The Planeteer (1935–1936) ====
- "Neptunian Refuge" (November 1935)
- "Mad Vision" (December 1935)
- "Pursuit into Nowhere" (January 1936)
- "Threat from Copernicus" (February 1936)
- "Trail of the Comet" (March 1936)
- "Bat-Shadow Shroud" (April 1936)

==== Super Science Stories (1940) ====
- "Emergency Refueling" (March 1940)
- "Bequest of the Angel" (May 1940)
- "Sunken Universe" (May 1942), rewritten as "Surface Tension" (1952)

==== Stirring Science Stories (1941) ====
- "Citadel of Thought" (February 1941)
- "Callistan Cabal" (April 1941)

==== Science Fiction Quarterly (1941) ====
- "Weapon Out of Time" (April 1941)
- "When Anteros Came" (December 1941)

==== Cosmic Stories (1941) ====
- "Phoenix Planet"^{β} (May 1941)
- "The Real Thrill" (July 1941)

==== Future (1941–1953) ====
- "The Topaz Gate"^{β} (August 1941)
- "The Solar Comedy" (June 1942)
- "The Air Whale" (August 1942)
- "Struggle in the Womb" (May 1950)
- "The Secret People"^{β} (November 1950)
- "Elixir" (September 1951)
- "Testament of Andros"^{β} (January 1953)

==== Astonishing Stories (1941) ====
- "Solar Plexus" (September 1941)

==== Super Science and Fantastic Stories (1944) ====
- "The Bounding Crown"^{β} (December 1944)

==== Science*Fiction (1946) ====
- "Knell", as by Arthur Lloyd Merlyn (January 1946)

==== Astounding Science Fiction (1946–1957) ====
- "Chaos, Co-Ordinated"^{β} as by John MacDougal, with Robert A. W. Lowndes (October 1946)
- "Tiger Ride" with Damon Knight (October 1948)
- "Okie"^{β} (April 1950)
- "Bindlestiff"^{β} (December 1950)
- "Bridge"^{β} (February 1952)
- "Earthman, Come Home"^{β} (November 1953)
- "At Death's End"^{β} (May 1954)
- "One-Shot" (August 1955)
- "Tomb Tapper"^{β} (July 1956)
- Get Out of My Sky ^{ε} (January 1957), included in Get out of My Sky Panther ed. (1980)

==== Startling Stories (1948) ====
- "Mistake Inside" (April 1948)

==== Planet Stories (1948–1951) ====
- "Against the Stone Beasts"^{β} (August 1948)
- "Blackout in Cygni" (July 1951)

==== Thrilling Wonder Stories (1948–1950) ====
- "No Winter, No Summer" as by Donald Laverty, with Damon Knight (October 1948)
- "The Weakness of RVOG"^{β} (February 1949), expanded as VOR (1958)
- "The Box" (April 1949)
- "The Homesteader" (June 1949)
- Let the Finder Beware ^{ε} (December 1949)
- "There Shall Be No Darkness"^{β} (April 1950), included in Get Out of My Sky Panther ed. (1980)

==== Jungle Stories (1948) ====
- "Serpent's Fetish" (December 1948)

==== Fantastic Story Quarterly (1950) ====
- "The Bore" (July 1950)

==== Imagination (1951) ====
- "The Void Is My Coffin" (June 1951)

==== Two Complete Science-Adventure Books (1951) ====
- The Warriors of Day ^{γ} (August 1951)
- Sargasso of Lost Cities ^{ε} (April 1953)

==== Other Worlds Science Stores (1952) ====
- "Nightride and Sunrise"^{β} with Jerome Bixby (June 1952)

==== Galaxy Science Fiction (1952–1970) ====
- "Surface Tension"^{β} (August 1952), collected in The Seedling Stars (1957)
- "Beep"^{β} (February 1954), expanded as The Quincunx of Time (1973)
- "The Writing of the Rat" (July 1956)
- "The Genius Heap" (August 1956)
- "On the Wall of the Lodge"^{β} with Virginia Kidd (June 1962)
- "The Shipwrecked Hotel"^{β} with Norman L. Knight, (August 1965), expanded as A Torrent of Faces (1967)
- "The Piper of Dis"^{β} with Norman L. Knight, (August 1966), expanded as A Torrent of Faces (1967)
- "Our Binary Brothers" (February 1969)
- "The City That Was the World"^{β} (July 1969)
- "A Style in Treason"^{β} (May 1970)
- The Day After Judgment ^{γ} (September 1970), collected in The Devil's Day (1990)
- "Darkside Crossing"^{β} (December 1970)
- "The Glitch" (June 1974)
- "The Art of the Sneeze" (November 1982)

==== Dynamic Science Fiction (1953) ====
- "Turn of a Century" (March 1953)
- The Duplicated Man ^{γ} with Robert A. W. Lowndes (August 1953)

==== Worlds of If (1953–1968) ====
- A Case of Conscience ^{ε} (September 1953), expanded as A Case of Conscience (1958)
- "The Thing in the Attic"^{β} (July 1954), collected in The Seedling Stars (1957)
- "Watershed" (May 1955), collected in The Seedling Stars (1957)
- "To Pay the Piper" (February 1956)
- Welcome to Mars ^{γ} (July 1966)
- Black Easter ^{γ} (August 1967), collected in The Devil's Day (1990)
- "Now That Man Is Gone" (November 1968)

==== Star Science Fiction Stories (1953) ====
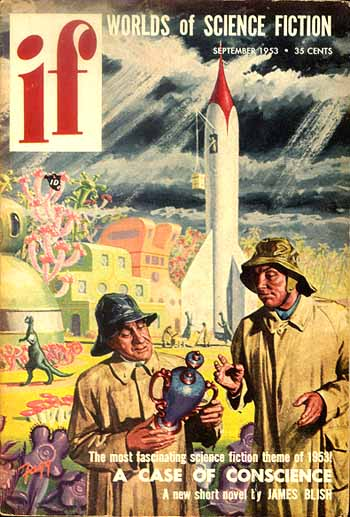
First publication of A Case of Conscience, September 1953.

- "F.Y.I." (December 1953)

==== The Magazine of Science Fiction and Fantasy (1953–1980) ====
- "First Strike" (June 1953)
- "The Book of Your Life" (March 1955)
- "With Malice to Come (3 vignettes)" (May 1955)
- "A Time to Survive"^{β} (February 1956), collected in The Seedling Stars Signet ed. (1959)
- "This Earth of Hours"^{β} (June 1959)
- "The Masks" (November 1959)
- "The Oath" (October 1960)
- "Who's in Charge Here?" (May 1962)
- "No Jokes on Mars" (October 1965)
- Midsummer Century ^{ε} (November 1982)

==== Fantastic Universe (1955) ====
- "Translation" (March 1955)

==== Infinity Science Fiction (1955–1957) ====
- "King of the Hill" (November 1955)
- "Sponge Dive" (June 1956)
- "Detour to the Stars" (December 1956)
- "Nor Iron Bars"^{β} (November 1957), expanded as Galactic Cluster (1959)

==== Science Fiction Stories (1956) ====
- "A Work of Art" (July 1956)

==== Science Fiction Adventures (1957) ====
- Two Worlds in Peril ^{ε} (February 1957)

==== Amazing Stories (1960–1961) ====
- … And All the Stars a Stage ^{γ} (June 1960)
- "And Some Were Savages" (November 1960)
- "A Dusk of Idols"^{β} (March 1961)

==== Impulse (1966) ====
- "A Hero's Life"^{β} (March 1966)

==== Analog (1967–1968) ====
- "To Love Another" (April 1967), expanded as A Torrent of Faces (1967)
- "Skysign"^{β} with Norman L. Knight, (May 1968)

==== Penthouse (1972) ====
- "A Light to Fight by" (June 1972)

==== Fantasy Book (1986) ====
- "The White Empire" (September 1986)

=== Anthologized short fiction (1952–2008) ===
- Beanstalk,^{ε} Future Tense (1952), ed. Kendell Foster Crossen. Greenberger. expanded in Titan's Daughter (1961).
- "Common Time", Shadows of Tomorrow (August 1953), ed. Frederik Pohl. Permabooks #P236.
- "A Matter of Energy", The Best from Fantasy and Science Fiction, Fifth Series (January 1956), ed. Anthony Boucher. Doubleday.
- "Nor Iron Bars"^{β} (expanded), Galactic Cluster (October 1959), ed. James Blish. Signet #S1719.
- "The Abattoir Effect", So Close to Home (February 27, 1961), ed. James Blish. Ballantine Books #465K.
- "None So Blind", Anywhen (July 1970), ed. James Blish. Doubleday.
- "How Beautiful With Banners", Orbit 1 (1966), ed. Damon Knight. Whiting & Wheaton.
- "We All Die Naked", Three for Tomorrow (August 1969), ed. Arthur C. Clarke. Meredith Press.
- "More Light", Alchemy and Academe (November 1970), ed. Anne McCaffrey. Doubleday.
- "Statistician's Day", Science Against Man (December 1970), ed. Anthony Cheetham. Avon #V2374.
- "Getting Along",^{β} Again, Dangerous Visions (March 17, 1972), ed. Harlan Ellison. Doubleday.
- "A True Bill: A Chancel Drama in One Act",^{β} Ten Tomorrows (September 1973), ed. Roger Elwood. Fawcett Gold Medal #M2820.
- "The Price of a Drink", The Berserkers (January 1974), ed. Roger Elwood. Trident ISBN 0-671-27113-X.
- "Making Waves", Works of Art (January 30, 2008). NESFA Press ISBN 978-1-886778-70-2.

=== Novels (1952–1990) ===
- Jack of Eagles (1952). Greenberg., also published as ESPer (1952). Avon.
- The Frozen Year (March 19, 1957). Ballantine Books #197, also published as Fallen Star (1957). Faber & Faber.
- VOR (April 1958). Avon #T-238.
- The Duplicated Man (1959). Avalon Books.
- A Torrent of Faces (1967), with Norman L. Knight. Doubleday.
- The Warriors of Day (1967). Lancer Books #73-580.
- The Star Dwellers (1961). G. P. Putnam's Sons.
- Titan's Daughter (March 1961). Berkley Medallion #G507.
- The Night Shapes (October 1962). Ballantine Books #F647.
- Mission to the Heart Stars (November 11, 1965). Faber & Faber.
- Welcome to Mars (July 1966). G. P. Putnam's Sons.
- The Vanished Jet (1968). Weybright and Talley.
- … And All the Stars a Stage (July 1971). Doubleday.
- Midsummer Century (May 1972). Doubleday, included in Midsummer Century Daw ed. (1974).
- The Quincunx of Time (October 1973). Dell #07244.

==== Cities in Flight series (1955–1962) ====
- Earthman, Come Home (1955). G. P. Putnam's Sons.
- They Shall Have Stars (1956). Faber & Faber, also published as Year 2018! (1957). Avon Books.
- The Triumph of Time (October 1958). Avon #T-279, also published as A Clash of Cymbals (1959). Faber & Faber.
- A Life for the Stars (1962). G. P. Putnam's Sons.

==== After Such Knowledge series (1958–1971) ====
- A Case of Conscience (April 1958). Ballantine Books #256.
- Doctor Mirabilis (1964). Faber & Faber #55198.
- Black Easter (1968)
- The Day After Judgment (1971), also published together with Black Easter as The Devil's Day (February 1990)

=== Collections (1957–2009) ===
- The Seedling Stars (1957). Gnome Press.
- The Seedling Stars (February 1959). Signet #S1622.
- Galactic Cluster (October 1959). Signet #S1719.
- So Close to Home (February 27, 1961). Ballantine Books #465K.
- Best Science Fiction Stories of James Blish (1965). Faber & Faber, also published as The Testament of Andros (August 1977). Arrow Books ISBN 0-09-914840-4.
- New Dreams This Morning (October 1966). Ballantine Books #U233.
- Anywhen (1970). Doubleday.
- Midsummer Century (February 1974). Daw #UQ1094.
- The Best of James Blish (August 1979). Ballantine/Del Rey ISBN 0-345-25600-X
- Get Out of My Sky (April 1980). Panther ISBN 0-586-04817-0.
- A Work of Art and Other Stories (July 1993). Severn House ISBN 0-7278-4464-4.
- With All Love: Selected Poems (March 1995). Anamnesis Press ISBN 0-9631203-1-X.
- A Dusk of Idols and Other Stories (May 1996). Severn House ISBN 0-7278-4967-0.
- In This World, or Another (July 2, 2003). Five Star ISBN 0-7862-5349-5.
- Works of Art (January 30, 2008). NESFA Press ISBN 978-1-886778-70-2.
- Flights of Eagles (October 20, 2009). NESFA Press ISBN 978-1-886778-86-3.

=== Anthologies (1970) ===
- Nebula Award Stories 5 (1970). Gollancz.

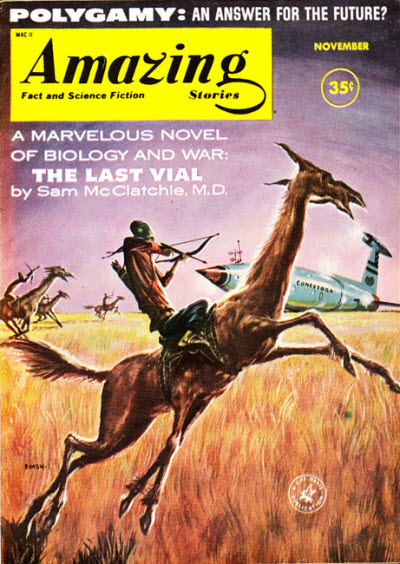
Blish's novelette "And Some Were Savages" was the cover story for the November 1960 issue of Amazing Stories, illustrated by Ed Emshwiller.

=== Nonfiction (1964–1987) ===
- The Issue at Hand (1964), as by William Atheling Jr. Advent Publishers.
- More Issues at Hand (December 1970), as by William Atheling Jr. Advent Publishers ISBN 0-911682-10-4.
- The Tale That Wags the God (July 1987). Advent Publishers ISBN 0-911682-29-5.

=== Star Trek (1967–1977) ===
- Star Trek (January 1967). Bantam Books #F3459.
- Star Trek 2 (February 1968). Bantam Books #F3439.
- Star Trek 3 (April 1969). Bantam Books #F4371.
- Spock Must Die! (February 1970). Bantam Books #H5515.
- Star Trek 4 (July 1971). Bantam Books #S7009.
- Star Trek 5 (February 1972). Bantam Books #S7300.
- Star Trek 6 (April 1972). Bantam Books #S7364.
- Star Trek 7 (July 1972). Bantam Books #S7480.
- Star Trek 8 (November 1972). Bantam Books #SP7550.
- Star Trek 9 (August 1973). Bantam Books #SP7808.
- Star Trek 10 (February 1974). Bantam Books #SP8401.
- Star Trek 11 (April 1975). Bantam Books #Q8717, also published as The Day of the Dove (October 1985). Spectra ISBN 0-553-25169-4.
- Star Trek 12 (November 1977), with J. A. Lawrence. Bantam Books ISBN 0-553-11382-8.

=== Omnibuses (1970–2013) ===
- Cities in Flight (February 1970). Avon #W187.
- After Such Knowledge (July 1991). Legend ISBN 0-09-983100-7).
- The Seedling Stars / Galactic Cluster (April 1983). Signet ISBN 0-451-12148-1.
- Black Easter / The Day After Judgement / The Seedling Stars (September 26, 2013) ISBN 978-0-575-12930-6.
