= Harold Frederic =

American journalist (1856–1898)

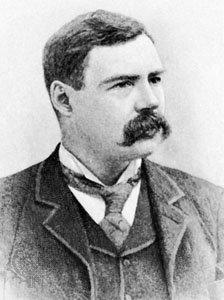
- Born: Harold Henry Frederick; August 19, 1856; Utica, New York, U.S.
- Died: October 19, 1898 (aged 42); Surrey, England, U.K. (Note: Some newspapers misreported the place of his death.)
- Resting place: Forest Hill Cemetery; Utica, New York, U.S.
- Occupations: Journalist; author
- Notable work: The Damnation of Theron Ware

Harold Frederic (August 19, 1856 – October 19, 1898) was an American journalist and novelist. His works include In the Valley (1890), The Damnation of Theron Ware (1896), and The Market Place (1899).

== Life and career ==
Harold Henry Frederick (Note: By at least 1878, Frederic dropped the "k" from the end of his name.) was born in Utica, New York, on August 19, 1856, to Presbyterian parents. He attended the Methodist church, but was generally skeptical towards religion. Frederic developed an early interest in photography and journalism. After his father was killed in a railroad accident when Frederic was 18 months old, the boy was raised primarily by his mother. He finished school at age fifteen, and soon began work as a photographer. For four years he was a photographic touch-up artist in his hometown and in Boston. In 1875, he began work as a proofreader for the newspaper The Utica Herald and then The Utica Daily Observer. Frederic later became a reporter. Frederic married Grace Green Williams in 1877, and they had five children together. By 1882 he was editor of the newspaper The Albany Evening Journal in the New York state capital. As editor of the Journal, Frederic was involved with politics and notably supported the future president Grover Cleveland for Governor of New York over Republican Charles J. Folger in the 1882 New York state election; and although the support cost Frederic his job when the son of a Republican senator bought the paper in 1884, Frederic became an advisor to the Governor and when Cleveland became President of the United States, their friendship opened doors for Frederic as he was establishing himself in England.

In 1884, Frederic went to live in England as London correspondent of the New York Times, and worked at this position for the rest of his life. Frederic covered topics such as the cholera epidemic in southern Europe, various wars and riots, and the Irish Home Rule movement, which he supported. It was in England that Frederic wrote his first important work of fiction, Seth's Brother's Wife (1887), which was favorably reviewed and followed by such works as The Lawton Girl (1890), In the Valley (1890), The Return of the O'Mahoney (1892), The Copperhead (1894), and Marsena (1895).

Although Frederic wrote several early stories, it was not until he published Illumination (1896), better known by its American title, The Damnation of Theron Ware, followed by Gloria Mundi (1898), that his talent as a novelist was fully realized. Damnation became a best seller and is Frederic's best known work; critic Jonathan Yardley called it "a minor classic of realism". Frederic also wrote a range of historical fiction on such topics as the American Revolution and the American Civil War. He wrote non-fiction as well, including a study on antisemitism in Russia, The New Exodus (1892), for which he went to Russia to investigate the persecution of the Jewish minority there.

In addition to the five children he had with his wife Grace, Frederic had three illegitimate children with his mistress Kate Lyon, and he established a secondary household with her in Surrey where they lived openly together. In August 1898, Frederic suffered a stroke, and as Edmund Wilson writes, "The doctors advised him to rest and to adapt himself to more temperate habits, but he dismissed their admonitions with scorn and went on smoking cigars, drinking brandy and whiskey, and riding. Kate Lyon was a Christian Scientist and called in a woman healer, who, Frederic said, 'bores my head off.'" Frederic, who did not share Lyon's faith, ignored both the doctors and Lyon's healer and eventually died, which led to a public scandal as his former wife Grace Frederic brought charges of manslaughter against Lyon and her healer, although both were later acquitted in trial. Frederic's wife also sued him for divorce just before he died.

Frederic's remains were returned to the United States and he was interred in Forest Hill Cemetery in Utica, New York.

Frederic's 1893 work The Copperhead, which dealt with the American Civil War, was adapted into a film in 2013.

== Works ==
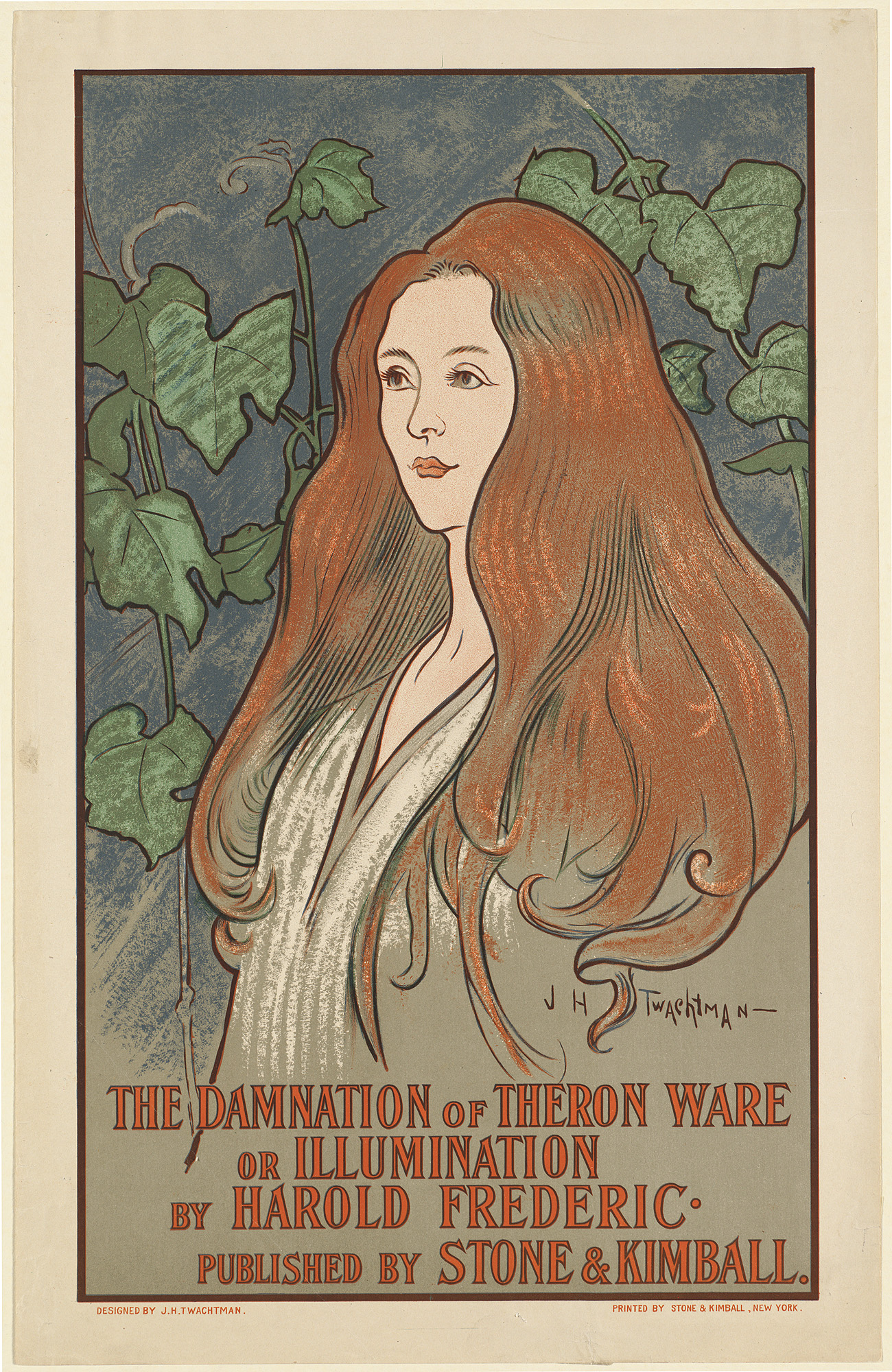
The Damnation of Theron Ware

=== Novels ===
- (1887). Seth's Brother's Wife. New York, London.
- (1890). The Lawton Girl. Charles Scribner's Sons, New York.
- (1890). In the Valley, a story of 1777. New York, London.
- (1892). The Return of the O'Mahoney. G. W. Dillingham Co., New York. London, 1893.
- (1893). The Copperhead, Charles Scribner's Sons. New York.
- (1894). Marsena, and other stories of the Wartime, Charles Scribner's Sons. New York; T. Fisher Unwin. London 1896.
- (1896). The Damnation of Theron Ware, Stone & Kimball, New York. Also called Illumination. London, Leipzig 1896 [Belknap Press of Harvard University Press, 1960].
- (1896). March Hares. London.
- (1898). Gloria Mundi. Chicago, New York, London.
- (1899). The Market Place. New York, London.

=== Collections ===
- (1894). 'The Copperhead' and Other Stories of the North During the American War. London.
- (1894). 'Marsena' and Other Stories of the Wartime. New York.
- (1896). Mrs. Albert Grundy: Observations in Philistia. London, New York.
- (1897). In the Sixties.
- (1898). 'The Deserter' and Other Stories: A Book of Two Wars. Lothrop Publishing Company, Boston.
- (1966). Harold Frederic's Stories of York State.
- (2015). The Martyrdom of Maev and Other Irish Stories. Washington D.C.:The Catholic University of America Press.

=== Non-fiction ===
- (1891). The Young Emperor William II of Germany: A Study in Character Development on a Throne. G. P. Putnam's Sons, New York.
- (1892). The New Exodus: A Study of Israel in Russia. New York, London.
