= Meanings of minor-planet names: 12001–13000 =

As minor planet discoveries are confirmed, they are given a permanent number by the IAU's Minor Planet Center (MPC), and the discoverers can then submit names for them, following the IAU's naming conventions. The list below concerns those minor planets in the specified number-range that have received names, and explains the meanings of those names.

Official naming citations of newly named small Solar System bodies are approved and published in a bulletin by IAU's Working Group for Small Bodies Nomenclature (WGSBN). Before May 2021, citations were published in MPC's Minor Planet Circulars for many decades. Recent citations can also be found on the JPL Small-Body Database (SBDB). Until his death in 2016, German astronomer Lutz D. Schmadel compiled these citations into the Dictionary of Minor Planet Names (DMP) and regularly updated the collection.

Based on Paul Herget's The Names of the Minor Planets, Schmadel also researched the unclear origin of numerous asteroids, most of which had been named prior to World War II. This article incorporates text from this source, which is in the public domain: SBDB New namings may only be added to this list below after official publication as the preannouncement of names is condemned. The WGSBN publishes a comprehensive guideline for the naming rules of non-cometary small Solar System bodies.

== 12001–12100 ==
Named minor planet	Provisional	This minor planet was named for...	Ref · Catalog
12001 Gasbarini	1996 ED_{9}	Ron Gasbarini (born 1960) is an amateur astronomer whose interest was inspired by the Apollo missions in the 1960s. He has served as president of the Royal Astronomical Society of Canada's Niagara Centre and won the service award of the society in 1995.	JPL · 12001
12002 Suess	1996 FR_{1}	Franz Eduard Suess (1867–1941), Austrian geologist who coined the term tektite. He was the son of geologist Eduard Suess (1831–1914)	MPC · 12002
12003 Hideosugai	1996 FM_{5}	Hideo Sugai (born 1930), a retired teacher, is a Japanese amateur astronomer. He has been observing variable stars since 1951, and his data have been reported to the Variable Star Observers League in Japan.	JPL · 12003
12005 Delgiudice	1996 KA_{3}	Maria del Giudice (born 1964), friend and now wife of one of the discovery team's observers and measurers, Frank Shelly	JPL · 12005
12006 Hruschka	1996 OO	František Hruschka (1819–1888) invented the centrifugal honey extractor and demonstrated it at an exposition in Brno (now in the Czech Republic) in 1865. He gained recognition for the development of modern beekeeping	JPL · 12006
12007 Fermat	1996 TD_{7}	Pierre de Fermat, (1601–1665), a lawyer in Toulouse, is considered the greatest amateur mathematician of all time.	JPL · 12007
12008 Kandrup	1996 TY_{9}	Henry Kandrup (1955–2003), an American astrophysicist and professor at the University of Florida, Gainesville. His eccentric and energetic lecturing style and love of nonlinear dynamics are now reflected in his celestial namesake, an unusual minor planet on a chaotic trajectory. The asteroid was named in his memory.	JPL · 12008
12010 Kovářov	1996 UN	Kovářov, first mentioned in 1220, is a south Bohemian village situated in a pleasant hilly landscape near Milevsko. It is known for its rich community life, including living folk customs as well as for its Gothic church and Brokoff's baroque statues. Its Czech name originates from blacksmith work.	IAU · 12010
12012 Kitahiroshima	1996 VH_{8}	Kitahiroshima, a city in Hokkaido in northeastern Japan.	JPL · 12012
12013 Sibatahosimi	1996 VU_{8}	Sibatamachi-hosiwomirukai, a Japanese amateur astronomer club in Sibata town, Miyagi prefecture, founded in 1986	JPL · 12013
12014 Bobhawkes	1996 VX_{15}	Robert Lewis Hawkes (born 1951), Canadian physicist Src	MPC · 12014
12016 Green	1996 XC	George Green (1793–1841), a self-taught miller's son of Nottingham, was instrumental (along with Gauss) in making the theories of electricity and magnetism a part of mathematical physics.	JPL · 12016
12022 Hilbert	1996 XH_{26}	David Hilbert (1862–1943), professor at Göttingen and one of the greatest mathematicians of all time.	JPL · 12022
12027 Masaakitanaka	1997 AB_{5}	Japanese amateur astronomer Masaaki Tanaka (born 1952) uses a Schmidt camera and binoculars to observe comets. He was one of the observers who rediscovered comet 122P/de Vico on 17 September 1995	JPL · 12027
12028 Annekinney	1997 AK_{7}	Astronomer Anne L. Kinney (born 1950) quantified the misalignment of the central black hole accretion disk and galaxy disk in Seyfert galaxies. She served as Director of NASA's Universe Division and Director of Goddard's Solar System Exploration Division. In 2015 she was named Chief Scientist for the Keck Observatory.	JPL · 12028
12031 Kobaton	1997 BY_{4}	Kobaton is a Eurasian collared dove (Shirakobato in Japanese), and is the official mascot character of Saitama Prefecture since 2005.	JPL · 12031
12032 Ivory	1997 BP_{5}	Sir James Ivory (1765–1842), Scottish mathematician.	JPL · 12032
12033 Anselmo	1997 BD_{9}	Anselmo Antonini (born 1946), an amateur astronomer in the Montelupo Group.	JPL · 12033
12035 Ruggieri	1997 CP_{13}	Guido Ruggieri (1913–1976), an Italian amateur astronomer known for his visual observations of Mars and Jupiter	MPC · 12035
12040 Jacobi	1997 EK_{8}	Carl Gustav Jacob Jacobi, (1804–1851), professor at Königsberg and Berlin.	JPL · 12040
12042 Laques	1997 FC	Pierre Laques (born 1934), a French astronomer and one of the co-discoverers of Helene (Saturn XII), a moon of Saturn, at the Pic du Midi Observatory	JPL · 12042
12044 Fabbri	1997 FU	Luciano Fabbri (born 1945), an amateur astronomer in the Montelupo Group.	JPL · 12044
12045 Klein	1997 FH_{1}	Felix Klein (1849–1925), a professor of mathematics at Erlangen and later at Göttingen.	JPL · 12045
12047 Hideomitani	1997 GX_{3}	In 1975, Hideo Mitani (born 1946) founded a library of nature photographs, including astronomical photographs. It became the most famous library of its kind in Japan and cultivated many other nature photographers.	JPL · 12047
12050 Humecronyn	1997 HE_{14}	Hume Blake Cronyn, Canadian businessman and politician †	MPC · 12050
12051 Pícha	1997 JO	Jaroslav Pícha (1921–1998), Czech meteorologist and amateur astronomer	MPC · 12051
12052 Aretaon	1997 JB_{16}	Aretaon, a Trojan warrior who was killed by Teucer.	JPL · 12052
12053 Turtlestar	1997 PK_{2}	Turtle Star Observatory (obs. code 628) located in Mülheim-Ruhr, Germany. It was built in 1995, by Andreas Boeker, his wife Karolin, Axel Martin and M. Tator. †	MPC · 12053
12056 Yoshigeru	1997 YS_{11}	Yoshida Shigeru (1952–1997), a Japanese physician.	JPL · 12056
12057 Alfredsturm	1998 DK_{1}	Alfred Sturm (born 1924) co-founder with Martin Geffert of the Starkenburg Observatory (Starkenburg-Sternwarte) in Heppenheim, Germany † ‡	MPC · 12057
12059 du Châtelet	1998 ED_{14}	Emilie du Châtelet (1706–1749), an acknowledged scientist among the leading thinkers of her time, translated Newton's Principia Mathematica into French in 1749, this still being considered the best existing translation. In 1745 she showed that the energy of a moving object is proportional to its mass and the square of its velocity	JPL · 12059
12061 Alena	1998 FQ_{2}	Alena Ruth Robbins, the mother of the discoverer.	JPL · 12061
12062 Tilmanspohn	1998 FB_{10}	Tilman Spohn (born 1950) was director of the Institute of Planetary Research at the German Aerospace Center (DLR) in Berlin. He pioneered in-situ measurements of thermal and mechanical properties of planetary surfaces and was Principal Investigator for the instrument MUPUS on the Rosetta lander Philae.	JPL · 12062
12064 Guiraudon	1998 FZ_{15}	Jean-Claude Guiraudon, who founded the French: Fédération Nationale des Clubs Scientifiques in 1961, which later evolved into the French: Association Nationale Sciences Techniques Jeunesse. He now works at the international level with MILSET, the French: Mouvement International pour le Loisir Scientifique Et Technique, which he helped create.	JPL · 12064
12065 Jaworski	1998 FA_{33}	Victor Jaworski (born 1984), an ISEF awardee in 2002	JPL · 12065
12067 Jeter	1998 FH_{42}	Crystal Lynn Jeter (born 1984), an ISEF awardee in 2002	JPL · 12067
12068 Khandrika	1998 FZ_{53}	Harish Gautam Khandrika (born 1987), an ISEF awardee in 2002	JPL · 12068
12069 Michaelbruno	1998 FC_{59}	Michael Bruno mentored a finalist in the 2019 Regeneron Science Talent Search, a science competition for high school seniors. He teaches at the North Carolina School of Science and Mathematics, Durham, North Carolina.	IAU · 12069
12070 Kilkis	1998 FK_{63}	Siir Sirinyasam Kilkis (born 1984), an ISEF awardee in 2002	JPL · 12070
12071 Davykim	1998 FV_{63}	Davy Kim (born 1985), an ISEF awardee in 2002	JPL · 12071
12072 Anupamakotha	1998 FA_{65}	Anupama Kotha (born 1985), an ISEF awardee in 2002	JPL · 12072
12073 Larimer	1998 FD_{66}	Curtis James Larimer (born 1986), an ISEF awardee in 2002	JPL · 12073
12074 Carolinelau	1998 FZ_{68}	Caroline Sue-Yuk Lau (born 1984), an ISEF awardee in 2002	JPL · 12074
12075 Legg	1998 FX_{69}	Tiffany Amelia Legg (born 1987), an ISEF awardee in 2002	JPL · 12075
12077 Frankthorne	1998 FZ_{70}	Frank Thorne mentored a finalist in the 2019 Regeneron Science Talent Search, a science competition for high school seniors. He teaches at the University School of Milwaukee, Milwaukee, Wisconsin.	IAU · 12077
12078 Ikezi	1998 FJ_{72}	Chihiro Ikezi mentored a finalist in the 2019 Regeneron Science Talent Search, a science competition for high school seniors. He teaches at the Saint Francis High School, Mountain View, California.	IAU · 12078
12079 Kaibab	1998 FZ_{73}	The Kaibab Formation, a massive limestone layer of Permian age that forms the bedrock of much of Northern Arizona.	JPL · 12079
12083 Darone	1998 FS_{121}	Gregory Darone mentored a finalist in the 2019 Regeneron Science Talent Search, a science competition for high school seniors. He teaches at the Charter School of Wilmington, Wilmington, Delaware.	IAU · 12083
12084 Unno	1998 FL_{125}	Juza Unno (a.k.a. Sano Shoichi), Japanese mystery writer and pioneer of science fiction	JPL · 12084
12085 Susanmoore	1998 HV_{19}	Susan Moore mentored a finalist in the 2019 Regeneron Science Talent Search, a science competition for high school seniors. She teaches at the Horace Greeley High School, Chappaqua, New York.	IAU · 12085
12086 Joshualevine	1998 HC_{22}	Joshua Levine (born 1985), an ISEF awardee in 2002	JPL · 12086
12087 Tiffanylin	1998 HB_{30}	Tiffany Fangtse Lin (born 1984), an ISEF awardee in 2002	JPL · 12087
12088 Macalintal	1998 HZ_{31}	Jeric Valles Macalintal (born 1986), an ISEF awardee in 2002	JPL · 12088
12089 Maichin	1998 HO_{35}	Diana Marie Maichin (born 1983), an ISEF awardee in 2002	JPL · 12089
12091 Jesmalmquist	1998 HS_{96}	Jessica Lea Malmquist (born 1987), an ISEF awardee in 2002	JPL · 12091
12092 Erinorourke	1998 HH_{97}	Erin O'Rourke mentored a finalist in the 2019 Regeneron Science Talent Search, a science competition for high school seniors. She teaches at the Syosset High School, Syosset, New York.	IAU · 12092
12093 Chrimatthews	1998 HF_{99}	Christina Marie Matthews (born 1986), an ISEF awardee in 2002	JPL · 12093
12094 Mazumder	1998 HX_{99}	Mark Mohan Mazumder (born 1985), an ISEF awardee in 2002	JPL · 12094
12095 Pinel	1998 HE_{102}	Philippe Pinel (1745–1826), a French physician who made revolutionary contributions to the treatment of patients suffering from mental illness, became chief physician at the La Salpêtrière clinic in Paris. His Traité médico-philosophique sur l´Aliénation mentale (1801) has been translated into several languages	JPL · 12095
12097 Peterlowen	1998 HQ_{121}	Peter Lowen (born 1966) mentored a finalist in the 2019 Regeneron Science Talent Search, a science competition for high school seniors. He teaches mathematics at the Ravenwood High School, Brentwood, Tennessee, USA.	JPL · 12097
12099 Meigooni	1998 HQ_{124}	David Nima Meigooni (born 1986), an ISEF awardee in 2002	JPL · 12099
12100 Amiens	1998 HR_{149}	The French city of Amiens, the capital of Picardy. It is famous for its cathedral, the tallest of the Gothic churches in France. Notable for its beautiful sculptures on the principal façade, it has been named the "Parthenon of Gothic architecture". The city is also worth a visit for its complex of gardens along the Somme river.	JPL · 12100

== 12101–12200 ==
back to top

Named minor planet	Provisional	This minor planet was named for...	Ref · Catalog
12101 Trujillo	1998 JX_{2}	Chad Trujillo (born 1973), an American astronomer and discoverer of minor planets of the California Institute of Technology, specializes in the study of Kuiper belt objects.	JPL · 12101
12102 Piazzolla	(1998 JB_{4)}	Astor Piazzolla (1921–1992) was an Argentine composer best known for his distinct nuevo tango. His fusion of the tango with Western musical elements, especially jazz, was successful in producing a new individual musical style.	JPL · 12102
12104 Chesley	1998 KO_{6}	Steven R. Chesley (born 1965), of the Solar System Dynamics Group at the Jet Propulsion Laboratory, is an expert in determination of the orbits of minor planets and application to the study of earth-impact probability.	JPL · 12104
12106 Menghuan	1998 KQ_{31}	Meng Huan (born 1985), an ISEF awardee in 2002	JPL · 12106
12107 Reneebarcia	1998 KU_{46}	Renee Barcia mentored a finalist in the 2019 Regeneron Science Talent Search, a science competition for high school seniors. She teaches at the Herricks High School, New Hyde Park, New York.	IAU · 12107
12108 Jamesaustin	1998 KJ_{48}	James Austin mentored a finalist in the 2019 Regeneron Science Talent Search, a science competition for high school seniors. He teaches at the Garnet Valley High School, Glen Mills, Pennsylvania.	IAU · 12108
12111 Ulm	1998 LU	Ulm, a city in Germany on the banks of the Danube river	JPL · 12111
12112 Sprague	1998 MK_{4}	Ann Sprague (born 1946) is a senior research associate with the Lunar and Planetary Laboratory of the University of Arizona. She is known for her work on the atmospheres of Mercury, the moon and Mars, as well as on the Messenger mission to Mercury	JPL · 12112
12113 Hollows	1998 OH_{12}	Fred Hollows (1929–1993), was a New Zealand-born ophthalmologist who saved the sight of thousands of aboriginal and poor people in third-world countries rather than make a comfortable living at home. His work outlives him, following his training of local doctors and establishing local interocular lens factories.	JPL · 12113
12115 Robertgrimm	1998 SD_{2}	Robert Grimm (born 1960) is a planetary geophysicist. His thermal models led to the first mathematical representations of fluid flow on meteorite parent bodies and to a greater understanding of the thermal and collisional evolution of minor planets, including the heliocentric zonation of the main belt	JPL · 12115
12117 Meagmessina	1999 JT_{60}	Meagan Elizabeth Messina (born 1985), an ISEF awardee in 2002	JPL · 12117
12118 Mirotsin	1999 NC_{9}	Yauhen Adolfovich Mirotsin (born 1985), an ISEF awardee in 2002	JPL · 12118
12119 Memamis	1999 NG_{9}	Megan Marie Miskowski (born 1984), an ISEF awardee in 2002	JPL · 12119
12120 Rebeccagrella	1999 NQ_{41}	Rebecca Grella mentored a finalist in the 2019 Regeneron Science Talent Search, a science competition for high school seniors. She teaches at the Brentwood High School – Sonderling Center, Brentwood, New York.	IAU · 12120
12121 Greenwald	1999 NX_{48}	Stephanie Greenwald mentored a finalist in the 2019 Regeneron Science Talent Search, a science competition for high school seniors. She teaches at the Byram Hills High School, Armonk, New York.	IAU · 12121
12123 Pazin	1999 OS	Pazin, a Croatian town in the Istrian Peninsula and the administrative center of Istria County.	JPL · 12123
12124 Hvar	1999 RG_{3}	Hvar, a Croatian island in the Adriatic Sea, located off the Dalmatian coast.	JPL · 12124
12125 Jamesjones	1999 RS_{4}	James Jones (born 1939) studied at Sheffield University in Yorkshire and has been professor of physics at the University of Western Ontario since 1966. Jones pioneered the video observation of meteors and single-station radar radiant mapping.	JPL · 12125
12126 Chersidamas	1999 RM_{11}	Chersidamas, son of King Priam of Troy.	JPL · 12126
12127 Mamiya	1999 RD_{37}	Rinzo Mamiya (1780–1844), an explorer and surveyor of the northern area of Japan. In 1809, he reached the north Sakhalin and showed that Karafuto (Sakhalin) is an island separated by a narrow channel, now called the Mamiya strait.	JPL · 12127
12128 Palermiti	1999 RP_{43}	Mike Palermiti (born 1949) provides expert consultation to the astronomical community about optics, telescope design and CCDs. He contributed to the early development of low-light-level imaging and has made significant observations of novae, minor planets, comets and occultations. He is a director of an observatory in Florida.	JPL · 12128
12130 Mousa	1999 RD_{146}	Ahmed Shaker Mousa (born 1984), 2002 Intel ISEF finalist. He attended the Avon Grove High School, Lincoln University, Pennsylvania, U.S.A.	MPC · 12130
12131 Echternach	2085 P-L	Eddy Echternach (born 1961), a Dutch science writer and assistant editor of the Dutch astronomical magazine Zenit, has been popularizing astronomy since the late 1980s. He is co-author of numerous books on astronomy and astronomical exercises for use in primary and high schools. The name was suggested by C. E. Koppeschaar.	JPL · 12131
12132 Wimfröger	2103 P-L	Willem Albertus Fröger (born 1962) is a Dutch amateur astronomer who lives in Argentina. He suggested names and prepared citations for more than 60 minor planets, one lunar crater and two craters on Mars.	JPL · 12132
12133 Titulaer	2558 P-L	Chriet Titulaer (1943–2017), Dutch science writer and astronomer, co-presenter, with Henk Terlingen, of the Dutch television coverage of the Apollo Moon landings	JPL · 12133
12134 Hansfriedeman	2574 P-L	Johannes Lambertus Maria ("Hans") Friedeman (1937–1996), was a Dutch journalist who enthusiastically reported on space travel, science and the environment. In 1977 he started his own weekly page, and in 1981 this led to the first complete section on science and society in a Dutch newspaper.	JPL · 12134
12135 Terlingen	3021 P-L	Henk Terlingen (1941–1994), a Dutch journalist who presented the Apollo Moon missions on Dutch television. Since the 1960s, his broadcasts in collaboration with Chriet Titulaer promoted a great interest in astronomy and space science in the Netherlands. The name was suggested by C. E. Koppeschaar.	JPL · 12135
12136 Martinryle	3045 P-L	Martin Ryle (1918–1984) was a British astrophysicist who developed the aperture synthesis technique of interferometry and constructed large radio telescopes, using them to discover and catalogue numerous radio sources.	JPL · 12136
12137 Williefowler	4004 P-L	William Alfred Fowler (1911–1995) was a nuclear astrophysicist who measured in the laboratory at Caltech the nuclear reactions that occur at lower energies in stars. He also worked on theories of supernovae and early nucleosynthesis.	JPL · 12137
12138 Olinwilson	4053 P-L	Olin C. Wilson (1909–1994) was an American spectroscopist who worked on solar and stellar activity cycles. With M. K. V. Bappu he found a method of determining a star's luminosity from the widths of two spectral lines with (see Wilson-Bappu effect)	JPL · 12138
12139 Tomcowling	4055 P-L	Thomas G. Cowling (1906–1990), British astrophysicist, was the first to compute a stellar model with a convective core and a radiative envelope. He also developed much of the theory of magnetic fields in stars and magnetospheres.	JPL · 12139
12140 Johnbolton	4087 P-L	John G. Bolton (1922–1993) was a pioneer radio astronomer in Australia who used interferometry with direct and sea-reflected signals to identify the first radio sources with optical objects. He directed two major radio observatories.	JPL · 12140
12141 Chushayashi	4112 P-L	Chushiro Hayashi (1920–2010) was a Japanese astrophysicist who made pioneering models of star formation and significant discoveries related to the formation of elements in the early universe.	JPL · 12141
12142 Franklow	4624 P-L	Frank J. Low (1933–2009), American physicist and astronomer, invented the gallium-doped germanium bolometer and became a leader in infrared astronomy. He pioneered open-port airborne astronomy and helped develop infrared spaceborne astronomy.	JPL · 12142
12143 Harwit	4631 P-L	Martin Harwit (born 1931), Czech-American astrophysicist and infrared astronomer, director (1987–1995) of the Smithsonian Institution's National Air and Space Museum	JPL · 12143
12144 Einhart	4661 P-L	Einhart (also Eginhard or Einhard, ca. 770) was a Frankish scholar and historian. He was the chancellor of Charles the Great and of his son Ludwig the Pious. Einhard wrote Vita Karoli Magni, the biography of Charles the Great, one of the most precious books of the early Middle Ages	JPL · 12144
12145 Behaim	4730 P-L	Martin Behaim (1459–1507) was a German merchant, astronomer and cosmographer from Nürnberg. He traveled through Europe and became a Portuguese knight. He developed the earliest terrestrial globe, Erdapfel, or `Earth Apple', with a diameter of about 50 cm	JPL · 12145
12146 Ostriker	6035 P-L	Jeremiah P. Ostriker (born 1937) is an American astrophysicist who has contributed to many fields of theoretical astrophysics and cosmology, including the distribution of baryonic and dark matter and values of cosmological parameters.	JPL · 12146
12147 Bramante	6082 P-L	Donato Bramante (1444–1514) was an Italian architect of the high Renaissance, working mainly in Milan and Rome. In Rome he designed his greatest work, St. Peter's Basilica	JPL · 12147
12148 Caravaggio	6636 P-L	Caravaggio (1571–1610) was an Italian artist of the Renaissance. He was almost forgotten after his death, but in the twentieth century his importance was rediscovered because of his great influence on the Baroque style during the Counter Reformation	JPL · 12148
12149 Begas	9099 P-L	Begas is the name of a German family of nineteenth-century artists, of whom the best known was Romantik-style painter Carl Joseph Begas (1794–1854). Of his four sons, Reinhold (1831–1911) and Carl Begas Jr. (1845–1916), were sculptors, and Oskar (1828–1883) and Adalbert (1836–1888) Begas were painters	JPL · 12149
12150 De Ruyter	1051 T-1	Michiel de Ruyter (1607–1676), in Dutch history a famous admiral, played a decisive role in the Anglo-Dutch Wars of the seventeenth century. De Ruyter was of humble origin but much loved by his sailors and soldiers. The name was suggested by C. E. Koppeschaar.	JPL · 12150
12151 Oranje-Nassau	1220 T-1	William the Silent, Prince of Orange (1533–1584), led the Netherlands provinces in their war of liberation against Spain during 1568–1648. "The Father of the Fatherland" was assassinated and is entombed in the Nieuwe Kerk in Delft. The Dutch national anthem, the Wilhelmus, was written in his honor	JPL · 12151
12152 Aratus	1287 T-1	Aratus of Soli (c. 315 BC/310 BC – 240 BC)) a Hellenistic poet and author of the Phaenomena, an influential didactic poem composed around 275 B.C. that describes the celestial sphere, the constellations and weather prognostications based on their rising and setting	JPL · 12152
12153 Conon	3219 T-1	Conon of Samos (c. 280-c. 220 B.C.) was a Hellenistic astronomer and mathematician who worked in Alexandria. In 246 B.C. he created the constellation of Coma Berenices, commemorating the sacrifice of Queen Berenice's tresses of hair after her husband's return from the Third Syrian War	JPL · 12153
12154 Callimachus	3329 T-1	Callimachus (c. 305–240 B.C.) was a Hellenistic scholar and poet who worked in Alexandria, where he compiled a catalogue of the famous library. He wrote the poem Aetia commemorating the creation of the eponymous constellation Coma Berenices by Conon of Samos in 246 B.C	JPL · 12154
12155 Hyginus	4193 T-1	Gaius Julius Hyginus (c. 64 B.C. – A.D. 17), Roman historian, philologist and mythographer, presided over the Palatine Library in Rome. His De Astronomia (or Poeticon Astronomicon) gives a comprehensive overview of the myths associated with the constellations. The name was suggested by R. H. van Gent	JPL · 12155
12156 Ubels	1042 T-2	Egbert Ubels (1969–2008), Dutch fireman who perished on 9 May 2008 while fighting a shipyard fire in De Punt (Drenthe, Netherlands), along with colleagues Raymond Patrick Soyer and Anne Kregel	JPL · 12156
12157 Können	1070 T-2	Günther Peter Können (born 1944), a researcher at the Koninklijk Nederlands Meteorologisch Instituut, specialized in atmospheric optics. He is famous for his book Polarized light in Nature, which describes phenomena such as halos and rainbows. The name was suggested by M. Drummen	JPL · 12157
12158 Tape	1101 T-2	Walter Tape (born 1941) is an Alaskan mathematician. With his book Atmospheric halos he made an outstanding contribution to the popularization of these beautiful phenomena. The name was suggested by G. P. Können and M. Drummen	JPL · 12158
12159 Bettybiegel	1142 T-2	Rebekka A. "Betty" Biegel (1886–1943) studied astronomy in Leiden, obtained her doctorate in Zürich, pursued psychology in Utrecht and developed psychological instruments for testing people. She killed herself with cyanide rather than allow herself to be transported to Auschwitz. The name was suggested by W. R. Dick	JPL · 12159
12160 Karelwakker	1152 T-2	Karel F. Wakker (born 1944), professor of astrodynamics at Delft Technical University, has made important contributions to Dutch, ESA and NASA space projects, as well as inspiring numerous students.	JPL · 12160
12161 Avienius	1158 T-2	Avienius, who lived in the second half of the 4th century, was a Latin poet from Etruria. He composed didactic poems on astronomy and geography. His Aratea was based on earlier Latin translations of Aratus' Phaenomena. The name was suggested by R. H. van Gent	JPL · 12161
12162 Bilderdijk	2145 T-2	Willem Bilderdijk (1756–1831) was a Dutch poet and scholar who composed two didactic astronomical poems, Starrenkennis (1794) and De Starrenhemel (1807). These described the celestial sphere, the Milky Way and the constellations. The name was suggested by R. H. van Gent	JPL · 12162
12163 Manilius	3013 T-2	Marcus Manilius (1st century AD), was a Roman poet and astrologer who wrote the comprehensive astronomical-astrological poem Astronomica. The five-volume work was dedicated to Tiberius and contains a mythological description of the constellations and the Milky Way. The name was suggested by R. H. van Gent.	JPL · 12163
12164 Lowellgreen	3067 T-2	Lowell Clark Green (born 1925), a Lutheran pastor/theologian for more than half a century and Renaissance/Reformation scholar, now resident in Buffalo, New York, has given constant support and encouragement to the life and astronomical career of his son, D. W. E. Green, who found the identifications for this object.	JPL · 12164
12165 Ringleb	3289 T-2	Peter Ringleb (born 1965), German neurologist, member of the team who cared for co– discoverer Ingrid van Houten-Groeneveld	JPL · 12165
12166 Oliverherrmann	3372 T-2	Oliver Herrmann (born 1973), German neurologist, member of the team who cared for co– discoverer Ingrid van Houten-Groeneveld	JPL · 12166
12167 Olivermüller	4306 T-2	Oliver Müller (born 1971), German cardiologist, member of the team who cared for co– discoverer Ingrid van Houten-Groeneveld	JPL · 12167
12168 Polko	5141 T-2	Norbert Polko (born 1944) has scanned more than 200,000 glass plates, a world record, from the largest European astronomical plate archive, at the Sonneberg Observatory. The name was suggested by R. Hudec.	JPL · 12168
12169 Munsterman	2031 T-3	Henk Munsterman (born 1946), a Dutch amateur astrophotographer, known for his photographs of planets, minor planets, comets, nebulae, starclusters and galaxies. The name was suggested by Mat Drummen, see (9705).	JPL · 12169
12170 Vanvollenhoven	2372 T-3	Pieter van Vollenhoven (born 1939), Dutch professor of risk management at the Technical University of Twente and Dutch ambassador of the International Year of Astronomy	JPL · 12170
12171 Johannink	2382 T-3	Carl F. Johannink (born 1959) is a Dutch high-school teacher and amateur astronomer. His main interests lie in meteor astronomy. He is a very prolific meteor observer, active within the Dutch Meteor Society. The name was suggested by K. Miskotte	JPL · 12171
12172 Niekdekort	2390 T-3	Niek De Kort (born 1956) has done outstanding work popularizing astronomy. He authored several books, including one about space research and the course book Modern Astronomy (1980) for a TV course with an enrollment of 25~000 people. The name was suggested by H. van Woerden and A. v. d. Brugge	JPL · 12172
12173 Lansbergen	3135 T-3	Philippus Lansbergen (1561–1632), Calvinist minister and active astronomical researcher in Middelburg, The Netherlands, in 1629 wrote the first popular book on astronomy in the Dutch language. The book promoted the Copernican system and became a bestseller.	JPL · 12173
12174 van het Reve	3164 T-3	Karel van het Reve (1921–1999), professor of Slavic languages at Leiden University and a prolific writer, was considered to be one of the finest Dutch essayists with wide-ranging interests. The name was suggested by F. Israel	JPL · 12174
12175 Wimhermans	3197 T-3	Willem Frederik Hermans (1921–1995), a Dutch author considered one of the most important writers in the Netherlands in the postwar period. His oeuvre includes novels, short stories, plays, along with poetry and essays, as well as philosophical and scientific works. The name was suggested by F. Israel	JPL · 12175
12176 Hidayat	3468 T-3	Bambang Hidayat (born 1934) is an active promoter of astronomy in Indonesia. Known for his work on visual binaries and H-emission-line stars, he was director of Bosscha Observatory in Lembang during 1968–1999 and vice-president of the IAU during 1994–2000	JPL · 12176
12177 Raharto	4074 T-3	Moedji Raharto (born 1954) is an Indonesian astronomer and senior lecturer at the Institut Teknologi Bandung. He was director of Bosscha Observatory in Lembang from 2000–2003 and is an authority on Galactic structure, based on the Hipparcos and IRAS-Point Source catalogues.	JPL · 12177
12178 Dhani	4304 T-3	Herdiwijaya Dhani (born 1963), an Indonesian astronomer and solar physicist. He was director of Bosscha Observatory in Lembang during 2004–2005. He is known for his work on binaries, solar magnetic activity and its influence on weather and climate.	JPL · 12178
12179 Taufiq	5030 T-3	Taufiq Hidayat (born 1965), an Indonesian astronomer and associate professor at the Institut Teknologi Bandung. He was director of Bosscha Observatory in Lembang during 2006–2009. Known for work on the solar system and extrasolar transits, he actively fights the adverse effects of urbanisation around the observatory	JPL · 12179
12180 Kistemaker	5167 T-3	Jacob Kistemaker (1917–2010), Teylers professor at Leiden University, was a pioneer in isotope separation, uranium enrichment, atomic and molecular collisions, and vacuum science and technology. Name suggested by H. Habing and F. Saris.	JPL · 12180
12182 Storm	1973 UQ_{5}	Theodor Storm (1817–1888), a German writer and local judge in his northern German hometown Husum. He wrote impressive poems and more than 50 novels. As a representative of "poetic realism", he described the landscapes and the people of his north Frisian coastal district.	JPL · 12182
12183 Caltonen	1975 SU_{1}	Craig Steven Altonen (born 1965) is the Chief Engineer for the Lucy mission.	IAU · 12183
12184 Trevormerkley	1975 SB_{2}	Trevor Franklin Merkley (born 1983) is the "Spacecraft Fault Protection Lead" of the Lucy mission. He also developed the software for Lucy's photovoltaic array deployment.	IAU · 12184
12185 Gasprinskij	1976 SL_{5}	Ismail Gasprinskij (1851–1914) was a Crimean-Tatar teacher, enlightener, writer, publisher and public figure.	JPL · 12185
12186 Mitukurigen	1977 ER_{5}	Mitukuri Genpo (1799–1863), a physician of Western medicine in the late Edo period.	JPL · 12186
12187 Lenagoryunova	1977 RL_{7}	Elena (Lena) Viktorovna Goryunova (born 1961), hydrologist at Sebastopol Institute of Hydrography.	JPL · 12187
12188 Kalaallitnunaat	1978 PE	Greenland (Greenlandic: Kalaallit Nunaat) is an autonomous country within the Kingdom of Denmark. Located on the largest island in the world, it has been inhabited for many millennia by indigenous arctic peoples with strong and unique cultural traditions, later joined by people from the Nordic countries.	JPL · 12188
12189 Dovgyj	1978 RQ_{1}	Stanislav Alekseevich Dovgyj (born 1954), a corresponding member of the Ukrainian National Academy of Sciences, is a scientist in the field of mechanics.	JPL · 12189
12190 Sarkisov	1978 SE_{5}	Pavel Djibraelovich Sarkisov (born 1932), rector of the D. I. Mendeleev Moscow Chemical-Technological University.	JPL · 12190
12191 Vorontsova	1978 TT_{8}	Margarita Alekseevna Vorontsova (born 1923), a pediatrician at the Simferopol children's hospital	MPC · 12191
12192 Gregbollendonk	1978 VD_{5}	Gregory R. Bollendonk (born 1960) is the "Spacecraft Systems Engineer" of the Lucy mission and accompanied Lucy's development from concept study to its launch.	IAU · 12192
12195 Johndavidniemann	1979 MM_{4}	John David Niemann (born 1984) is the Mission Assurance Manager of the Lucy mission.	IAU · 12195
12196 Weems	1979 MM_{8}	Weyman Weems (born 1965) is the "Solar Array Principal Engineer" of the Lucy mission.	IAU · 12196
12197 Jan-Otto	1980 FR_{2}	Jan-Otto Carlsson (born 1943) is professor of inorganic chemistry at Uppsala University and has for nine years been the dean of the Faculty of Sciences and Technology.	JPL · 12197
12199 Sohlman	1980 TK_{6}	Michael Sohlman (born 1944) is a well-known Swedish specialist in economics and finance, executive director of the Nobel Fund, a member of the Royal Swedish Academy of Sciences and the Royal Swedish Academy of Engineering Sciences.	JPL · 12199
12200 Richlipe	1981 EM_{7}	Richard Loyde Lipe Jr. (born 1964) is the Program Manager and Engineering Manager of the Lucy mission at Lockheed Martin Space.	IAU · 12200

== 12201–12300 ==
back to top

Named minor planet	Provisional	This minor planet was named for...	Ref · Catalog
12201 Spink	1981 ED_{12}	James W. Spink (born 1963) is the Program Manager for the Northrop Grumman's photovoltaic system. The UltraFlex solar array is an accordion fanfold blanket made of triangular-shaped lightweight panels that form a shallow umbrella-shaped membrane structure when tensioned (Src).	IAU · 12201
12202 Toddgregory	1981 EM_{13}	Todd Gregory (born 1968) is the Technical Director for the photovoltaic array of the Lucy mission.	IAU · 12202
12203 Gehling	1981 EO_{19}	Russell Neel Gehling (born 1959) was the "Solar Array Principal Engineer of the Lucy mission, until his retirement.	IAU · 12203
12204 Jonpineau	1981 EK_{26}	Jon Paul Pineau (born 1978) is the "Aerospace Engineer" and "Lead Science Operations Center (SOC) Systems Engineer" for the Lucy mission.	IAU · 12204
12205 Basharp	1981 EZ_{26}	Bret Alan Sharp (born 1964) contributed to NASA's is the "Spacecraft Engineering Manager", "Thermal Manager", and the "Propulsion Manager" of the Lucy mission.	IAU · 12205
12206 Prats	1981 EG_{27}	Rebecca Maria Prats (born 1989) is the Configuration Manager of the Lucy mission.	IAU · 12206
12207 Matthewbeasley	1981 EU_{28}	Matthew Beasley (born 1973) is the "Deputy Payload Systems Engineer" of the Lucy mission.	IAU · 12207
12208 Jacobenglander	1981 EF_{35}	Jacob Aldo Englander (born 1984) is the "Trajectory Optimization Lead" of the Lucy mission.	IAU · 12208
12209 Jennalynn	1981 EF_{37}	Jenna Lynn Jones (née Crowell, b. 1984) received her PhD in physics from the University of Central Florida in 2018. Her dissertation involved shape modeling and analysis of thermal observations of near-Earth asteroid (1627) Ivar. Jenna has been active in outreach activities involving the public and school children in the fields of astronomy and physics.	IAU · 12209
12210 Prykull	1981 EA_{42}	Cory J. Prykull (born 1992) is the "Assembly, Test, and Launch Operations Mechanical Operations Lead" of the Lucy mission.	IAU · 12210
12211 Arnoschmidt	1981 KJ	Arno Schmidt, German novelist.	JPL · 12211
12214 Miroshnikov	1981 RF_{2}	Mikhail Mikhailovich Miroshnikov (born 1926), director of the Vavilov State Optical Institute from 1966 to 1989.	JPL · 12214
12215 Jessicalounsbury	1981 US_{22}	Jessica Lounsbury (née Thompson, born 1979) is the "NASA Project Systems Engineer" of the Lucy mission.	IAU · 12215
12218 Fleischer	1982 RK	Randall Craig Fleischer (born 1959), the ebullient and multi-talented music director and conductor of the Flagstaff Symphony Orchestra.	JPL · 12218
12219 Grigorʹev	1982 SC_{8}	Mikhail Grigorʹevich Grigorʹev, Russian chief (1957–1962) of the space-vehicle launch site now known as the Plesetsk Cosmodrome (see also 11824)	JPL · 12219
12220 Semenchur	1982 UD_{6}	Semen Ivanovich Churyumov, Ukrainian doctor of philosophy and socionics, senior lecturer in the mathematics department at the Kyiv National Aviation University	JPL · 12220
12221 Ogatakoan	1982 VS_{2}	Ogata Koan (1810–1863), a medical doctor with knowledge of European medicine in the late Edo period.	JPL · 12221
12222 Perotto	1982 WA	Pier Giorgio Perotto, Italian electronics engineer	JPL · 12222
12223 Hoskin	1983 TX	Michael A. Hoskin (born 1930) founded the Journal for the History of Astronomy in 1970 and has since served as its editor. He established the archives at Churchill College, Cambridge, is a leading expert on William Herschel and has done pioneering archeoastronomical work around the western Mediterranean basin.	JPL · 12223
12224 Jimcornell	1984 UN_{2}	James Cornell, American astronomer	JPL · 12224
12225 Yanfernández	1985 PQ	Yanga Rolando Fernández, Canadian astronomer † ‡	MPC · 12225
12226 Caseylisse	1985 TN	Carey M. ("Casey") Lisse (born 1961) is an expert on cometary dust and has made significant contributions to understanding the size distribution of the dust using infrared observations. The name was suggested by M. F. A'Hearn.	JPL · 12226
12227 Penney	1985 TO_{3}	Big John Penney is representative of the team of workers who find a deep and abiding love for the challenges and rigors of wintering at South Pole Station.	JPL · 12227
12229 Paulsson	1985 UK_{3}	Rolf Paulsson (born 1943), a lecturer at Uppsala University, has been an outstanding teacher of theoretical physics for generations of students	JPL · 12229
12234 Shkuratov	1986 RP_{2}	Yurij G. Shkuratov (born 1952) is director of the Institute of Astronomy of Kharkiv National University. He is a well known expert in the theory of light scattering and optical measurements of laboratory analogues of asteroid regolith and cometary particles. The citation was written by D. F. Lupishko.	JPL · 12234
12235 Imranakperov	1986 RB_{12}	Akperov Imran Guru Ogly (born 1958), professor of economics and president of the inter-regional association of non-state education institutes in southern Russia, is also founder and rector of an institute in Rostov-on-Don. The name was suggested by S. S. Svetashev and R. Y. Gurnikovskaya.	JPL · 12235
12237 Coughlin	1987 HE	Thomas B. Coughlin, of the Near Earth Asteroid Rendezvous (NEAR) mission team and programs manager of the Applied Physics Laboratory of Johns Hopkins University.	JPL · 12237
12238 Actor	1987 YU_{1}	Actor, the alleged father of Cteatos and Eurytos, two Greek warriors who beat Nestor in the chariot race.	JPL · 12238
12239 Carolinakou	1988 CN_{4}	Carolina Carreira Nakou (born 2001), the daughter of Sandra Carreira and Thodoris Nakos. The latter works on galactic lenses at the Royal Observatory at Uccle.	JPL · 12239
12240 Droste-Hülshoff	1988 PG_{2}	Annette von Droste-Hülshoff, German author and poet.	JPL · 12240
12241 Lefort	1988 PQ_{2}	Gertrud Freiin von le Fort (1876–1971), German poet.	JPL · 12241
12242 Koon	1988 QY	Koon, a notable fighter, the eldest son of Antenor.	JPL · 12242
12244 Werfel	1988 RY_{2}	Franz Werfel, Czech poet.	JPL · 12244
12246 Pliska	1988 RJ_{8}	Pliska was the first capital of the Bulgarian state, founded in 681. The conversion to Christianity under Knayz Boris I occurred in Pliska in 855. There he welcomed the disciples of the brothers Saint Cyril and Saint Methodius, creators of the Slavic alphabet. It is also the birthplace of the discoverer	JPL · 12246
12247 Michaelsekerak	1988 RO_{11}	Michael James Sekerak (born 1977) is the "NASA Deputy Project Systems Engineer" of the Lucy mission.	IAU · 12247
12248 Russellcarpenter	1988 RX_{12}	James Russell Carpenter (born 1966) is the "Goddard Space Flight Center Technical Deputy Manager for Space Science Mission Operations" for the OSIRIS-REx and the Lucy mission.	IAU · 12248
12249 Hannorein	1988 SH_{2}	Hanno Rein (b. 1983), a German dynamicist and associate professor at the University of Toronto.	IAU · 12249
12252 Gwangju	1988 VT_{1}	Gwangju, Korea, became the seventh friendship city of Sendai, Japan on 20 April 2002. Gwangju and Sendai are famous for their cultural, artistic and academic facilities, and each will host World Cup soccer games this year.	JPL · 12252
12257 Lassine	1989 GL_{4}	George Lassine (1953–2003), a member of the Belgian astronomical club Astronomie Centre Ardenne-Neufchâteau.	JPL · 12257
12258 Oscarwilde	1989 GN_{4}	Oscar Wilde, Irish playwright, poet, and writer.	JPL · 12258
12259 Szukalski	1989 SZ_{1}	Albert Szukalski (1945–2000), Polish-born Belgian sculptor who worked in Antwerp and sometimes used very eccentric means for establishing his work. One of his foremost pieces of art concerns "La Cena", a monument of 13 statues that has been erected in the Nevada desert.	JPL · 12259
12261 Ledouanier	1989 TY_{4}	Henri Rousseau, French post-impressionist painter, nicknamed "Le Douanier" ("The Customs Officer").	JPL · 12261
12262 Nishio	1989 UL	Tomoaki Nishio (born 1963), an editor of Gekkan Tenmon Guide, the Japanese monthly astronomical magazine.	JPL · 12262
12267 Denneau	1990 KN_{1}	Larry Denneau (born 1968), American software engineer for the Moving Object Processing System of Pan-STARRS	JPL · 12267
12270 Bozar	1990 QR_{9}	The name "Bozar" for the Palais des Beaux-Arts in Brussels was inspired by the language of Brussels residents.	JPL · 12270
12272 Geddylee	1990 SZ_{3}	Geddy Lee (Gary Lee Weinrib), Canadian bassist, vocalist and keyboardist for the band Rush	JPL · 12272
12275 Marcelgoffin	1990 VS_{5}	Marcel Goffin (1913–1999), an accomplished amateur violin maker.	JPL · 12275
12276 IJzer	1990 WW_{1}	IJzer, a river in Flanders.	JPL · 12276
12277 Tajimasatonokai	1990 WN_{2}	Tajimasatonokai is an astronomy group which has long been engaged in popularizing astronomy by holding public viewing events and lectures around Toyooka city, Hyogo prefecture.	JPL · 12277
12278 Kisohinoki	1990 WQ_{2}	Japanese cypresses (hinoki), especially the Kiso cypresses (Kiso hinoki, in Japanese), were used as building materials for castles during the Edo era. They were protected like human beings. The Kiso cypresses form a natural forest 400 years old.	JPL · 12278
12279 Laon	1990 WP_{4}	Laon, the capital of the Aisne department in northern France.	JPL · 12279
12280 Reims	1990 WS_{4}	Reims, a city in the French department of Marne, the old capital (Durocortorum, later Remi) of the Roman province Belgica.	JPL · 12280
12281 Chaumont	1990 WA_{5}	Chaumont, Haute-Marne, France	JPL · 12281
12282 Crombecq	1991 BV_{1}	Michelle Crombecq (born 1946), a secretary at the port of Antwerp.	JPL · 12282
12284 Pohl	1991 FP	Frederik Pohl, American author † Archived 2008-07-20 at the Wayback Machine	MPC · 12284
12286 Poiseuille	1991 GY_{4}	Jean Louis Marie Poiseuille (1797–1869) was a French physicist and physiologist who, through his work on the pressure of blood, became interested in the resistance of the flow of viscous fluids in small tubes. This led to the formulation of the Hagen-Poiseuille Law. The unit of viscosity is named the poise	JPL · 12286
12287 Langres	1991 GH_{5}	Langres, a French city in the south of the Haute-Marne department.	JPL · 12287
12288 Verdun	1991 GC_{6}	Verdun, France.	JPL · 12288
12289 Carnot	1991 GP_{7}	Nicolas Léonard Sadi Carnot, (1796–1832) a French physicist.	JPL · 12289
12291 Gohnaumann	1991 LJ_{2}	Gottfried O. H. Naumann (born 1935) is the director of the Universitäts-Augenklinik in Erlangen-Nürnberg and president of the International Council of Ophthalmology. He is considered one of the foremost ophthalmologists in the world and has received many honors.	JPL · 12291
12292 Dalton	1991 LK_{2}	John Dalton, British physicist and chemist.	JPL · 12292
12294 Avogadro	1991 PQ_{2}	Amedeo Avogadro, Italian scientist.	JPL · 12294
12295 Tasso	1991 PE_{3}	Torquato Tasso, an Italian writer and poet.	JPL · 12295
12298 Brecht	1991 PL_{17}	Bertolt Brecht, German dramatist, stage director, and poet.	JPL · 12298

== 12301–12400 ==
back to top

Named minor planet	Provisional	This minor planet was named for...	Ref · Catalog
12301 Eötvös	1991 RR_{12}	Loránd Eötvös, Hungarian physicist.	JPL · 12301
12306 Pebronstein	1991 TM_{14}	Peter Bronstein (born 1947), father-in-law of the discoverer.	JPL · 12306
12309 Tommygrav	1992 DD_{3}	Tommy Grav, Norwegian astronomer	JPL · 12309
12310 Londontario	1992 DE_{4}	London, Ontario, the Canadian city.	JPL · 12310
12311 Ingemyr	1992 EO_{6}	Mikael Ingemyr (born 1991), a student at the high school for space studies in Kiruna, was one of the winners of "The Universe—yours to discover with the Nordic Optical Telescope"	JPL · 12311
12312 Väte	1992 EM_{8}	Väte is a small parish on Gotland with a church from the thirteenth century. Here can also be found an old farm, Norrbys, reflecting agricultural life 70 years ago	JPL · 12312
12317 Madicampbell	1992 HH_{1}	Margaret Diane Campbell (born 1976), a Ph.D. student at the University of Western Ontario, became interested in astronomy as a young girl.	JPL · 12317
12318 Kästner	1992 HD_{7}	Erich Kästner, German author and journalist.	JPL · 12318
12320 Loschmidt	1992 PH_{1}	Josef Loschmidt (1821–1895), Czech physicist.	JPL · 12320
12321 Zurakowski	1992 PZ_{1}	Paul R. Zurakowski (born 1927), volunteer director of the Chabot Observatory Telescope Makers' Workshop for more than 30 years.	JPL · 12321
12323 Haeckel	1992 RX	Ernst Haeckel (1834–1919), German naturalist.	JPL · 12323
12324 Van Rompaey	1992 RS_{3}	Pierre Van Rompaey (born 1921) is a Belgian architect and an artist of surreal figurative paintings. His popular work is displayed in private collections at Antwerp.	JPL · 12324
12325 Bogota	1992 RH_{7}	Bogotá, the capital of Colombia	JPL · 12325
12326 Shirasaki	1992 SF	Shuichi Shirasaki (born 1958), an anesthesiologist in Sapporo city, was the finalist in the selection of a Japanese astronaut candidate by the National Space Development Agency of Japan in 1999.	JPL · 12326
12327 Terbrüggen	1992 SX_{1}	Dietrich Terbrüggen (born 1941), a well-known German surgeon.	JPL · 12327
12329 Liebermann	1992 SR_{23}	Max Liebermann (1847–1935), a German painter.	JPL · 12329
12335 Tatsukushi	1992 WJ_{3}	Tatsukushi is a beach on the western side of Ashizuri peninsular in Kochi prefecture known for the unusual sight of rock pillars of various sizes sculpted by waves. An undersea viewing tower is built there to see many kinds of rare fishes.	JPL · 12335
12339 Carloo	1992 YW_{1}	Carloo, a small hamlet south of the Royal Observatory at Uccle.	JPL · 12339
12340 Stalle	1992 YJ_{2}	Stalle, a hamlet in the eastern part of the municipality of Uccle.	JPL · 12340
12341 Calevoet	1993 BN_{4}	Calevoet is a hamlet in the southwestern part of the municipality of Uccle. The name means "grassless ford". However, the name also means "bare foot", which gave birth to the legend that Charlemagne crossed the small river at Calevoet barefooted.	JPL · 12341
12342 Kudohmichiko	1993 BL_{12}	Michiko Kudoh (born 1942) has been associated with the Gotoh Planetarium and Astronomical Museum in Tokyo. She reaches out to other astronomers through her website.	JPL · 12342
12343 Martinbeech	1993 DT_{1}	Martin Beech (born 1959) is an assistant professor of astronomy at the University of Regina, Saskatchewan. He researches meteor light curves, the dynamics of meteoroid streams, cometary aging and meteoroid-stream formation.	JPL · 12343
12344 Maryland	1993 FB_{1}	Maryland references both the US state (“MD”) and the University of Maryland (“UMD”).	IAU · 12344
12349 Akebonozou	1993 GO	Akebonozou (Stegodon aurorae) is an extinct species of Japanese elephant which lived in the Early Pleistocene (2.5-1 million years ago). An almost complete skeleton of Akebonozou was found in Taga-cho, Shiga Prefecture. The Taga specimen has been designated as a natural monument of Japan.	IAU · 12349
12350 Feuchtwanger	1993 HA_{6}	Lion Feuchtwanger, a German author.	JPL · 12350
12352 Jepejacobsen	1993 OX_{6}	Jens Peter Jacobsen, a Danish writer and poet.	JPL · 12352
12353 Márquez	1993 OR_{9}	Gabriel García Márquez (1927–2014), a Colombian novelist.	JPL · 12353
12354 Hemmerechts	1993 QD_{3}	Kristien Hemmerechts, a Flemish author.	JPL · 12354
12355 Coelho	1993 QU_{3}	Paulo Coelho (born 1947), a Brazilian lyricist and novelist.	JPL · 12355
12356 Carlscheele	1993 RM_{14}	Carl Wilhelm Scheele, a Swedish apothecary.	JPL · 12356
12357 Toyako	1993 ST_{1}	Lake Tōya ("Toyako" in Japanese), part of Shikotsu-Tōya National Park in Hokkaido	JPL · 12357
12358 Azzurra	1993 SO_{2}	Azzurra (born 2010 Jan. 4) is the grandchild of the discoverer. Her name is a hope for clearer skies	JPL · 12358
12359 Cajigal	1993 SN_{3}	With his founding in 1831 of the Military Academy of Mathematics, Juan Manuel Cajigal y Odoardo (1803–1856) initiated the study of mathematics and engineering in Venezuela. His installation of the first astronomical telescopes in Caracas was recognized with the establishment of El Observatorio Cajigal there in 1888.	JPL · 12359
12360 Unilandes	1993 SQ_{3}	The Universidad de Los Andes, founded in Mérida in 1785, is one of the most important educational institutions in Venezuela.	JPL · 12360
12362 Mumuryk	1993 TS_{1}	Mumuryk Keiko Yuharo (born 1959) is a painter and illustrator. Having started painting as a 4-year-old, she works in oil, water, engraving and relief. Her illustrations were used for posters by the Japanese International Space Station and the STS-123 Mission.	JPL · 12362
12363 Marinmarais	1993 TA_{24}	Marin Marais (1656–1728), the central figure in the French school of bass-viol composers and performers that flourished during the late 17th and early 18th centuries.	JPL · 12363
12364 Asadagouryu	1993 XQ_{1}	Asada Gouryu (1734–1799), an astronomer in the Japanese Edo period, studied positional astronomy. He also founded "Senjikan", a private school in astronomy, in Osaka, and educated many outstanding astronomers, including Takashi Yoshitoki and Hazama Shigetomi.	JPL · 12364
12365 Yoshitoki	1993 YD	Takahashi Yoshitoki (1764–1804) was chief of the Edo National Astronomical Observatory at Edo, Japan, from 1795 to 1804. He mainly studied positional astronomy, devising a new calendar computation method, "Kansei reki", with Hazama Shigetomi.	JPL · 12365
12366 Luisapla	1994 CD_{8}	Luisa Pla, Spanish-Venezuelan teacher of French, born in Villarrobledo co-founder (with her husband, Manuel Sanchez Jordan) of the Lope de Vega high school in Valencia, founder of Spanish history studies at La Universidad de Carabobo	JPL · 12366
12367 Ourinhos	1994 CN_{8}	Ourinhos, São Paulo, Brazil	JPL · 12367
12368 Mutsaers	1994 CM_{11}	Charlotte Mutsaers, Dutch writer †	MPC · 12368
12369 Pirandello	1994 CJ_{16}	Luigi Pirandello (1867–1936), a Sicilian writer.	JPL · 12369
12370 Kageyasu	1994 GB_{9}	Takahashi Kageyasu (1785–1829) was the chief astronomer of the shogunal government of Japan. He was among the first to compile and publish maps of the world and East Asia based on the latest knowledge then available in scientific geography. He also established the book office of Western culture in 1811.	JPL · 12370
12372 Kagesuke	1994 JF	Shibukawa Kagesuke (1787–1856), chief of the Edo National Astronomical Observatory in Edo, Japan, from 1809 to 1856. JPL	MPC · 12372
12373 Lancearmstrong	1994 JE_{9}	Lance Armstrong (born 1971), an American cyclist and cancer survivor.	JPL · 12373
12374 Rakhat	1994 JG_{9}	Rakhat, a planet with the first known extraterrestrial life in the novel The Sparrow, by Mary Doria Russell. First contact is established when a group of specialists organized by Jesuits is sent to the planet.	JPL · 12374
12376 Cochabamba	1994 NW_{1}	Cochabamba, a city in Bolivia.	JPL · 12376
12378 Johnston	1994 PK_{1}	David Macarthur Johnston (1928–2022), an Australian farmer from Baradine, who was a birdwatcher in the Pilliga forest and an organizer of bird surveys.	IAU · 12378
12379 Thulin	1994 PQ_{11}	Ingrid Thulin (1929–2004), a Swedish screen actor.	JPL · 12379
12380 Sciascia	1994 PB_{14}	Leonardo Sciascia (1921–1989), a Sicilian novelist and polemicist.	JPL · 12380
12381 Hugoclaus	1994 PH_{30}	Hugo Claus, Flemish writer.	JPL · 12381
12382 Niagara Falls	1994 SO_{5}	Niagara Falls †	MPC · 12382
12383 Eboshi	1994 TF_{1}	Eboshi-iwa (also known as Uba Shima), a large hat-shaped rock visible from the coast, symbol of Southern Beach of Chigasaki, Kanagawa prefecture	JPL · 12383
12384 Luigimartella	1994 TC_{2}	Luigi Martella (born 1956), a well-known Italian amateur astronomer.	JPL · 12384
12386 Nikolova	1994 UK_{5}	Simona Rumenova Nikolova (born 1971), a graduate student at the University of Western Ontario, calculated comet data at the Royal Astronomical Observatory in Sofia and studied at the University of Regina, Saskatchewan.	JPL · 12386
12387 Tomokofujiwara	1994 UT_{11}	Tomoko Fujiwara (born 1975) is an assistant professor at the Kyushu University. Her main interest consists of the long-term variability of stars and historical records of astronomy. She has been a member of IAU Commission 27 since 2006. The name was suggested by M. Hirai and K. Hurukawa.	JPL · 12387
12388 Kikunokai	1994 VT_{6}	The traditional dance troupe "Kikunokai" was established in 1972 by Michiyo Hata (Onoe Kikunori). The Kikunokai has created numerous dance numbers that are based on classical Japanese dance and have been performed in many countries.	JPL · 12388
12391 Ecoadachi	1994 WE_{2}	Adachi Ward (Eco-Adachi Ward), one of 23 wards of Tokyo, known for its environmentalism	JPL · 12391
12395 Richnelson	1995 CD_{2}	Richard Nelson (born 1966) is well known for his work in developing computer simulations for n -body systems and applying these to planet formation, both in our solar system and in other systems.	JPL · 12395
12396 Amyphillips	1995 DL_{1}	Amy Phillips (born 1956) received her MS in Optical Sciences from the University of Arizona. She has studied issues in remote sensing and properties of optical materials in harsh environments. She has also worked in the field of intellectual property, and is active in rural and suburban land-use issues.	JPL · 12396
12397 Peterbrown	1995 FV_{14}	Peter Gordon Brown (born 1970) studied at the University of Alberta and the University of Western Ontario and was appointed to the faculty of the latter. His specialties are meteoroid streams, meteor analysis and meteorite recovery.	JPL · 12397
12398 Pickhardt	1995 KJ_{3}	Wilhelm Pickhardt (born 1923) studied geology at the Rheinische-Friedrich-Wilhelms-Universität in Bonn. He conducted research at the Mining Research Institute for Bituminous Coal and held an adjunct professorship at Technische Universität Berlin.	JPL · 12398
12399 Bartolini	1995 OD	Corrado Bartolini (born 1941), professor at the University of Bologna since 1970, has focused his interests on contact spectrophotometric binaries, RR Lyrae and magnetic stars and x-ray binaries. With colleagues, he was successful in 1997 in observing the first optical counterpart of a gamma-ray burst.	JPL · 12399
12400 Katumaru	1995 OA_{1}	Katumaru Okuni (born 1932), the younger brother of the discoverer.	JPL · 12400

== 12401–12500 ==
back to top

Named minor planet	Provisional	This minor planet was named for...	Ref · Catalog
12401 Tucholsky	1995 OG_{10}	Kurt Tucholsky (1890–1935), a German author who was a masterly critic of philistinism, nationalism, militarism and corruptibility. He wrote poems, chansons and stories. His best-known novels were Rheinsberg and Schloá Gripsholm. In 1933, he was expatriated from his homeland and later committed suicide.	JPL · 12401
12405 Nespoli	1995 RK	Paolo Angelo Nespoli, Italian Mission Specialist astronaut	JPL · 12405
12406 Zvíkov	1995 SZ_{1}	Zvíkov Castle, Czech Republic †	MPC · 12406
12407 Riccardi	1995 SC_{2}	The historian of mathematics Pietro Riccardi (1828–1898) wrote the monumental work Biblioteca Matematica italiana dall'origine della stampa ai primi anni del XIX secolo, an annotated bibliography of all the books published by Italian scientists during the nineteenth century	JPL · 12407
12408 Fujioka	1995 SP_{2}	Hiroshi Fujioka (born 1946), born in Kuma Town, is an actor, martial artist, and a dedicated volunteer in Iraq, Ethiopia and Cambodia. Since his debut in 1970, he has starred in more than 20 movies and a number of TV dramas, including the most popular Japanese television program in the 1970s, Kamen Rider	JPL · 12408
12409 Bukovanská	1995 SL_{3}	Marcela Bukovanská (born 1935), a research worker in meteoritics, was head of the department of mineralogy and petrology of the National Museum in Prague. Name suggested by M. Šolc.	JPL · 12409
12410 Donald Duck	1995 SM_{3}	Donald Duck, the famous character of Walt Disney's cartoons, has amused generations of children and adults alike	JPL · 12410
12411 Tannokayo	1995 SQ_{3}	Kayoko Tanno, Japanese elementary school teacher and science educator, who worked on the staff of the Saga prefecture Space and Science Museum during 2002–2006	JPL · 12411
12412 Muchisachie	1995 ST_{4}	Muchi Sachie, Japanese music teacher	JPL · 12412
12413 Johnnyweir	1995 SQ_{29}	Johnny Weir (born July 2, 1984), American athlete, figure-skating champion and Olympian	JPL · 12413
12414 Bure	1995 SR_{29}	Pavel Bure, ice hockey player †	MPC · 12414
12415 Wakatatakayo	1995 SW_{52}	Takayo Wakata, mother of the Japanese astronaut Koichi Wakata	JPL · 12415
12418 Tongling	1995 UX_{2}	Tongling, Anhui	MPC · 12418
12421 Zhenya	1995 UH_{5}	Eugenia Krysina (born 1952), a chemist who lives in Moscow, is a friend of the discoverer and displays a keen interest in astronomy, especially in minor planets. Zhenya is the diminutive form of Eugenia	JPL · 12421
12423 Slotin	1995 UQ_{16}	Louis Slotin, Canadian physicist and chemist †	MPC · 12423
12426 Racquetball	1995 VL_{2}	Racquetball evolved from the Mayan Meso American ball game played throughout Central America from 2000 B.C. through 1500 A.D. Today the sport is played on a four-wall court by two to four players with a short racquet and a small rubber ball. John Africano, an AMOS team member, has a passion for playing the game.	JPL · 12426
12431 Webster	1995 YY_{10}	Alan Reginald Webster (born 1939), a professor in the department of electrical and computer engineering at the University of Western Ontario, has research interests that include meteor astronomy.	JPL · 12431
12432 Usuda	1996 AR_{1}	The Usuda Deep Space Center of the Japan Aerospace Exploration Agency, located in Saku city, Nagano prefecture, conducts command operations and receives telemetry and data from deep-space explorers such as Hayabusa and Kaguya. The site features a parabolic antenna of diameter 64 meters and weight 1980 tons	JPL · 12432
12433 Barbieri	1996 AF_{4}	Giovanni Barbieri (born 1941) is an amateur astronomer in the Montelupo Group.	JPL · 12433
12435 Sudachi	1996 BX	Citrus sudachi, a small, round, green citrus fruit that is a specialty of Tokushima prefecture, Japan	JPL · 12435
12437 Westlane	1996 BN_{6}	Westlane Secondary School, Niagara Falls, Ontario, Canada †	MPC · 12437
12439 Okasaki	1996 CA_{3}	During the past three decades amateur astronomer Kiyomi Okasaki (born 1950) has discovered two comets and three supernovae at his observatory in Kahoku, Yamagata prefecture	JPL · 12439
12440 Koshigayaboshi	1996 CF_{3}	Koshigayaboshi, "the star of Koshigaya", southeast Saitama prefecture, Japan, in honour of the city's fiftieth anniversary in 2008	JPL · 12440
12442 Beltramemass	1996 DO_{1}	Massimiliano Beltrame (1942–2001) taught topography and the science of construction at a high school in Terni. He was also an amateur astronomer specializing in photography. An astronomy club in Terni has been named in his memory	JPL · 12442
12443 Paulsydney	1996 EQ_{2}	With the gracious support of his family, Paul Sydney, a physicist on the AMOS team, has dedicated many long hours to demonstrating that U.S. Air Force assets could be applied successfully to following up minor planets. In return, the Air Force has benefited significantly from collaboration with the astronomical community	JPL · 12443
12444 Prothoon	1996 GE_{19}	Prothoon was a Trojan warrior who was killed by Teucer in the Trojan War	JPL · 12444
12445 Sirataka	1996 HE_{2}	The town of Sirataka, where the discoverer was born, is located in the southern part of Yamagata prefecture. The town is famous for its textile industry and weir-fishing	JPL · 12445
12446 Juliabryant	1996 PZ_{6}	Australian astrophysicist Julia Bryant (born 1971) is recognized for her past, present and future contributions to science, family and friendship	JPL · 12446
12447 Yatescup	1996 XA_{12}	Yates Cup, Canadian sports trophy †	MPC · 12447
12448 Mr. Tompkins	1996 XW_{18}	Mr. Tompkins, character from George Gamow's books †	MPC · 12448
12456 Genichiaraki	1997 AC_{1}	Genichi Araki (born 1954) is an amateur astronomer and a science teacher in Junior High School. He was one of the discoverers of comet C/1983 H1 (IRAS-Araki-Alcock)	JPL · 12456
12460 Mando	1997 AF_{5}	Mando, the largest annual festival in Iruma, Saitama prefecture, involves thousands of lantern lights. Since 1978 the Mando Festival has been conducted with the coordinated efforts of the citizenry and administration under a theme of cooperation and communication	JPL · 12460
12464 Manhattan	1997 AH_{8}	Manhattan, is the original island borough of New York City, which was obtained from the Indians by the Dutch in 1626. It became New York under the English in 1664, and is the commercial and cultural heart of the city.	JPL · 12464
12465 Perth Amboy	1997 AD_{10}	The U.S. city of Perth Amboy, New Jersey city, was settled in 1683 and incorporated in 1718. It is an important industrial city and port of entry with a fine harbor near New York City.	JPL · 12465
12468 Zachotín	1997 AE_{18}	Zachotín, Czech Republic † Archived 2011-05-25 at the Wayback Machine	MPC · 12468
12469 Katsuura	1997 AW_{18}	Katsuura is a city in Chiba prefecture, where one can enjoy the wide ocean and forested hills. The Katsuura Tracking and Communication Station of the Japan Aerospace Exploration Agency is located on a hill to conduct command operations and receive telemetry from satellites that observe the earth or the moon	JPL · 12469
12470 Pinotti	1997 BC_{9}	Roberto Pinotti (born 1944), after getting his degree in political science in 1972, became a writer and amateur astronomer of the Montelupo Group	JPL · 12470
12471 Larryscherr	1997 CZ_{6}	Lawrence Scherr (born 1949), an optical engineer and lens designer, designed the optics for the NEAT/Oschin instrument. He has designed, built, tested or analyzed stray light for prototype medical instruments, intraocular lenses, scaterometers, large surveillance telescopes, automated optical test systems and Mars camera lenses	JPL · 12471
12472 Samadhi	1997 CW_{11}	Samadhi Hindu/Buddhist concept	MPC · 12472
12473 Levi-Civita	1997 CM_{19}	Tullio Levi-Civita (1873–1941), an Italian mathematician who developed and extended the tensor calculus, originally formulated by Ricci, which plays a central role in the theory of general relativity and in differential geometry. In 1938 Levi-Civita was removed from his professorship at the University of Rome because of his being Jewish.	JPL · 12473
12477 Haiku	1997 EY_{20}	The Haiku, Japanese poetic form	MPC · 12477
12478 Suzukiseiji	1997 EX_{25}	Seiji Suzuki (born 1933), a retired teacher, is secretary of the Yamagata Astronomers Liaison Conference (since 1997) and the Yamagata Astronomers Club	JPL · 12478
12479 Ohshimaosamu	1997 EG_{27}	Osamu Ohshima (born 1954) is a high school teacher and one of Japan's leading observers of variable stars. He was a staff member at Bisei Astronomical Observatory and played an important role in the founding of the observatory, using his talent in mechanical and computer technology	JPL · 12479
12481 Streuvels	1997 EW_{47}	Stijn Streuvels, Flemish writer †	MPC · 12481
12482 Pajka	1997 FG_{1}	Paula Pravdová (born 1990) is the only daughter of the second discoverer. She inherited many of her father's interests (playing musical instruments, cycling, swimming, diving, singing, joking) and that is why she was very popular when visiting Modra Observatory. Pajka is her familiar name.	JPL · 12482
12485 Jenniferharris	1997 GO_{1}	Jennifer Harris Trosper (born 1968) led the Mars Pathfinder Surface Operations Test program and was Flight Director for Mars Pathfinder when it landed on 1997 July 4	JPL · 12485
12490 Leiden	1997 JB_{13}	Leiden, Netherlands, seat of the University of Leiden †	MPC · 12490
12491 Musschenbroek	1997 JE_{15}	Pieter van Musschenbroek, Dutch scientist, inventor of the Leyden jar †	MPC · 12491
12492 Tanais	1997 JP_{16}	Tanais, ancient Greek name of the Don river	JPL · 12492
12493 Minkowski	1997 PM_{1}	Hermann Minkowski (1864–1909) was awarded a prestigious prize from the Paris Academy of Sciences while still a student. He was Einstein's teacher at Zurich and later developed the concept of four-dimensional space-time—the mathematical foundation of the special theory of relativity.	JPL · 12493
12494 Doughamilton	1998 DH_{11}	Douglas P. Hamilton (born 1/1/1966) is a dynamicist specializing in small particles in the solar system. His major contributions involve motions and resonances when several different forces are involved, work for which he received the American Astronomical Society's Urey prize in 1999. The name was suggested by M. A'Hearn.	JPL · 12494
12496 Ekholm	1998 FF_{9}	Andreas G. Ekholm (1975–2001) was a planetary scientist who contributed to the fields of impact cratering processes, geophysics of icy satellites, and photometry of KBOs and Centaurs. He was also active in humanitarian causes before his premature death in an automobile accident in his native Sweden.	JPL · 12496
12497 Ekkehard	1998 FQ_{14}	Ekkehard Kührt (born 1954) is the head of the Asteroids and Comets Department of the DLR institute of Planetary Research. He has been active in minor bodies research for decades and was involved in many space missions. Ekkehard has been the project leader of the DLR contributions for the instruments of the Rosetta mission.	IAU · 12497
12498 Dragesco	1998 FY_{14}	Jean Dragesco (born 1920) is an accomplished biologist and amateur astronomer. For many years, using various telescopes, he worked in Africa, where he made exquisite high-resolution photographs of the solar system that have inspired many amateur astronomers around the world.	JPL · 12498
12500 Desngai	1998 FB_{49}	Desmond Ngai (born 1985), an ISEF awardee in 2002	JPL · 12500

== 12501–12600 ==
back to top

Named minor planet	Provisional	This minor planet was named for...	Ref · Catalog
12501 Nord	1998 FL_{66}	Ashley Lynne Nord (born 1985), an ISEF awardee in 2002	JPL · 12501
12503 Danielpeterson	1998 FC_{75}	Daniel Peterson mentored a finalist in the 2019 Regeneron Science Talent Search, a science competition for high school seniors. He teaches at the Interlake High School, Bellevue, Washington.	IAU · 12503
12504 Nuest	1998 FS_{75}	Jennifer Elizabeth Nuest (born 1985), an ISEF awardee in 2002	JPL · 12504
12506 Pariser	1998 FR_{108}	Andrew Robert Pariser (born 1985), an ISEF awardee in 2002	JPL · 12506
12508 Darcysloe	1998 FZ_{113}	Darcy Sloe mentored a finalist in the 2019 Regeneron Science Talent Search, a science competition for high school seniors. She teaches at the Montgomery Blair High School, Silver Spring, Maryland.	IAU · 12508
12509 Pathak	1998 FY_{117}	Madhav Dilip Pathak (born 1987), an ISEF awardee in 2002	JPL · 12509
12511 Patil	1998 FQ_{121}	Reshma Shivaputrappa Patil (born 1985), an ISEF awardee in 2002	JPL · 12511
12512 Split	1998 HW_{7}	Split is the largest Dalmatian city and the second-largest urban center in Croatia. Located on the shores of the eastern Adriatic Sea, it is a vital link to the numerous surrounding islands. The historic city of Split is built around the "Palace of Diocletian", the world's best preserved Roman palace	JPL · 12512
12513 Niven	1998 HC_{20}	Ivan M. Niven, Canadian-American mathematician †	MPC · 12513
12514 Schommer	1998 HM_{26}	Robert Schommer, an astronomer at Cerro Tololo InterAmerican Observatory.	JPL · 12514
12515 Suiseki	1998 HE_{43}	Literally "Water-Stone" in Japanese, Suiseki is the Japanese art form of stone appreciation.	JPL · 12515
12516 Karenyoung	1998 HB_{45}	Karen Young mentored a finalist in the 2019 Regeneron Science Talent Search, a science competition for high school seniors. She teaches at the Paul Laurence Dunbar High School, Lexington, Kentucky.	IAU · 12516
12517 Grayzeck	1998 HD_{52}	Edwin John Grayzeck, American astronomer, Archive Manager, Small Bodies Node of the Planetary Data System, Department of Astronomy, University of Maryland, College Park †	MPC · 12517
12519 Pullen	1998 HH_{55}	Sarah Adele Pullen (born 1985), an ISEF awardee in 2002	JPL · 12519
12522 Rara	1998 HL_{99}	Prem Vilas Fortran M. Rara, Filipino, an ISEF awardee in 2002	MPC · 12522
12524 Conscience	1998 HG_{103}	Hendrik Conscience (1812–1883), a founder of Flemish literature.	JPL · 12524
12525 Kathleenloia	1998 HT_{147}	Kathleen Loia mentored a finalist in the 2019 Regeneron Science Talent Search, a science competition for high school seniors. She teaches at the Lynbrook High School, San Jose, California.	IAU · 12525
12526 de Coninck	1998 HZ_{147}	Herman de Coninck (1944–1997), a Flemish poet and critic.	JPL · 12526
12527 Anneraugh	1998 JE_{3}	Anne C. Raugh (born 1962), an astronomer and informatician worked as a programmer for the COBE mission and for more than a decade has been the lead applications programmer for the Small Bodies Node of NASA's Planetary Data System at the University of Maryland.	JPL · 12527
12529 Reighard	1998 KG_{41}	Chelsea Lynne Reighard (born 1986), an ISEF awardee in 2002	JPL · 12529
12530 Richardson	1998 KO_{46}	Aaron Cole Richardson (born 1984), an ISEF awardee in 2002	JPL · 12530
12533 Edmond	1998 LA	Edmond, a city in central Oklahoma, was founded on 1889 Apr. 22 in the first of the Oklahoma land runs.	JPL · 12533
12534 Janhoet	1998 LB_{3}	Jan Hoet (1936–2014), a Belgian art curator, has studied art history and archeology. In 1975 he was appointed director of the Museum of Contemporary Art in Ghent. Well known from his exposition Documenta IX (Düsseldorf, 1992), he has been responsible for several expositions in Europe, Japan and Canada.	JPL · 12534
12535 Fazlurahman	1998 MZ_{30}	Fazlur Rahman mentored a finalist in the 2019 Regeneron Science Talent Search, a science competition for high school seniors. He teaches at the Oklahoma School of Science and Mathematics, Oklahoma City, Oklahoma.	IAU · 12535
12537 Kendriddle	1998 MT_{34}	Kendra LeeAnn Riddle (born 1983), an ISEF awardee in 2002	JPL · 12537
12539 Chaikin	1998 OP_{2}	Andrew L. Chaikin (born 1956), a renowned author and space historian whose interests include the Apollo program. His landmark book A Man on the Moon served as the basis for the HBO miniseries From the Earth to the Moon, which dramatized the first lunar exploration.	JPL · 12539
12540 Picander	1998 OU_{9}	Picander, pseudonym of Christian Friedrich Henrici (1700–1764), was one of Bach's most important librettists.	JPL · 12540
12541 Makarska	1998 PD_{1}	Makarska is a town located on a horseshoe-shaped bay between the Biokovo mountains and the Adriatic Sea in the Croatian region of Dalmatia. It is the center of the Makarska riviera and noted for its palm-fringed promenade. Its Franciscan monastery houses a renowned seashell collection	JPL · 12541
12542 Laver	1998 PN_{1}	Rodney Laver (born 1938), a tennis player from the discoverer's home state of Queensland and widely regarded as one of the greats of the game.	JPL · 12542
12545 Taniamurphy	1998 QT_{19}	Tania Murphy mentored a finalist in the 2019 Regeneron Science Talent Search, a science competition for high school seniors. She teaches at the Lakeside High School, Atlanta, Georgia.	IAU · 12545
12548 Erinriley	1998 QJ_{25}	Erin Kathleen Riley (born 1983), an ISEF awardee in 2002	JPL · 12548
12553 Aaronritter	1998 QZ_{46}	Aaron M. Ritter (born 1986), an ISEF awardee in 2002	JPL · 12553
12556 Kyrobinson	1998 QG_{48}	Kylan Thomas Robinson (born 1985), an ISEF awardee in 2002	JPL · 12556
12557 Caracol	1998 QQ_{54}	"El Caracol" at Chichén Itza in Yucatán, Mexico, has been described as probably the most famous of all the astronomically related buildings in ancient Mesoamerica.	JPL · 12557
12561 Howard	1998 SX_{7}	Ron Howard American Actor, director, producer.	JPL · 12561
12562 Briangrazer	1998 SP_{36}	Brian Grazer American Producer.	JPL · 12562
12564 Ikeller	1998 SO_{49}	Ingeborg Bickel-Keller (born 1941), the discoverer's wife.	JPL · 12564
12565 Khege	1998 SV_{53}	Keith Hege (born 1932), of Steward Observatory, University of Arizona, is an expert in high angular resolution astronomy and instrumentation.	JPL · 12565
12566 Derichardson	1998 SH_{54}	Derek C. Richardson (born 1968), an expert on computational techniques of the University of Maryland, has made major contributions to the study of rubble piles, particularly their tidal distortion and their collisions. He is also applying his codes to the formation of planets. The name was suggested by M. F. A'Hearn and P. Michel.	JPL · 12566
12567 Herreweghe	1998 SU_{71}	Philippe Herreweghe, Belgian conductor.	JPL · 12567
12568 Kuffner	1998 VB_{5}	Moriz von Kuffner (1854–1939), Austrian brewer, alpinist and founder of the Kuffner Observatory in Vienna, Austria	JPL · 12568
12571 Occhiogrosso	1999 NM_{2}	Justin Occhiogrosso mentored a finalist in the 2019 Regeneron Science Talent Search, a science competition for high school seniors. He teaches at the Harriton High School, Rosemont, Pennsylvania.	IAU · 12571
12572 Sadegh	1999 NN_{8}	Cameron Sadegh (born 1984), an ISEF awardee in 2002	JPL · 12572
12574 LONEOS	1999 RT	Lowell Observatory Near-Earth-Object Search (LONEOS).	JPL · 12574
12575 Palmaria	1999 RH_{1}	Palmaria is the most important island in the gulf of La Spezia, famous for its old quarry of a rare golden marble nicknamed "Portoro".	JPL · 12575
12576 Oresme	1999 RP_{1}	Nicole Oresme(c. 1323 – 1382), bishop of Lisieux, conceived the representation of time-varying quantities by two-dimensional graphs, using the latitude-longitude analogy.	JPL · 12576
12577 Samra	1999 RA_{13}	Shamsher Singh Samra (born 1986), an ISEF awardee in 2002	JPL · 12577
12578 Bensaur	1999 RF_{17}	Benjamin Paul Saur (born 1983), an ISEF awardee in 2002	MPC · 12578
12579 Ceva	1999 RA_{28}	The brothers Giovanni (1647–1734) and Tommaso (1648–1737) Ceva were Italian mathematicians interested in geometry and physics.	JPL · 12579
12580 Antonini	1999 RM_{33}	Pierre Antonini a French amateur astronomer, discoverer of minor planets and supernovae at his private Bedoin observatory	JPL · 12580
12581 Rovinj	1999 RE_{34}	Rovinj is a city on the western coast of the Istrian peninsula. It was initially built on an island but connected to the mainland in the eighteenth century. Saint Euphemia's basilica overlooks the medieval city and its 22 offshore islands	JPL · 12581
12583 Buckjean	1999 RC_{35}	the discoverer's father, a railroad conductor, and his mother, a registered nurse.	JPL · 12583
12584 Zeljkoandreic	1999 RF_{36}	Željko Andreić (born 1957), a renowned Croatian amateur astronomer and promoter of astronomy.	JPL · 12584
12585 Katschwarz	1999 RN_{64}	Kathleen Alice Schwarz (born 1984), an ISEF awardee in 2002	JPL · 12585
12586 Juliaspeyer	1999 RQ_{81}	Julia Speyer mentored a finalist in the 2019 Regeneron Science Talent Search, a science competition for high school seniors. She teaches at the Brookline High School, Brookline, Massachusetts.	IAU · 12586
12588 Arseneau	1999 RR_{98}	Ross Arseneau mentored a finalist in the 2019 Regeneron Science Talent Search, a science competition for high school seniors. He teaches at the Detroit Country Day School, Beverly Hills, Michigan.	IAU · 12588
12589 Davidanand	1999 RR_{114}	David Anand, 2019 Broadcom MASTERS finalist for his environmental and earth science project	IAU · 12589
12590 Ballantine	1999 RN_{125}	Mary Ballantine, 2019 Broadcom MASTERS finalist for her microbiology and biochemistry project	IAU · 12590
12591 Bergey	1999 RT_{133}	Rachel Bergey, 2019 Broadcom MASTERS finalist for her animal science project	IAU · 12591
12592 Brianchen	1999 RD_{134}	Brian Chen, 2019 Broadcom MASTERS finalist for his plant science project	IAU · 12592
12593 Shashlov	1999 RQ_{136}	Anthon Michailovich Shashlov (born 1986), an ISEF awardee in 2002	JPL · 12593
12594 Sidorclare	1999 RU_{145}	Sidor Clare, 2019 Broadcom MASTERS finalist for her materials & bioengineering project	IAU · 12594
12595 Amandashaw	1999 RD_{149}	Amanda Bryce Shaw (born 1985), an ISEF awardee in 2002	JPL · 12595
12596 Shukla	1999 RT_{154}	Kavita M. Shukla (born 1984), an ISEF awardee in 2002	JPL · 12596
12597 Williamdaniel	1999 RL_{158}	William Daniel, 2019 Broadcom MASTERS finalist for his animal science project	IAU · 12597
12598 Sierra	1999 RC_{159}	Elizabeth Sierra (born 1985), an ISEF awardee in 2002	JPL · 12598
12599 Singhal	1999 RT_{160}	Akshat Singhal (born 1985), an ISEF awardee in 2002	JPL · 12599

== 12601–12700 ==
back to top

Named minor planet	Provisional	This minor planet was named for...	Ref · Catalog
12601 Tiffanyswann	1999 RO_{178}	Tiffany Nichole Swann (born 1985), an ISEF awardee in 2002	JPL · 12601
12602 Tammytam	1999 RT_{183}	Tammy Tam (born 1985), an ISEF awardee in 2002	JPL · 12602
12603 Tanchunghee	1999 RF_{184}	Tan Chun Ghee (born 1984), an ISEF awardee in 2002	JPL · 12603
12604 Lisatate	1999 RC_{194}	Lisa Michelle Tate (born 1986), an ISEF awardee in 2002	JPL · 12604
12606 Apuleius	2043 P-L	Lucius Apuleius, 2nd-century Roman writer and orator	JPL · 12606
12607 Alcaeus	2058 P-L	Alcaeus, 7th–6th-century B.C. Greek poet	JPL · 12607
12608 Aesop	2091 P-L	Aesop (Herodotus Aisopos of Sardes), 6th-century B.C. Greek slave who won his freedom with his fine fables	JPL · 12608
12609 Apollodoros	2155 P-L	Apollodoros of Athens, 2nd-century B.C. Greek scholar and stoic, author of a much used Chronika	JPL · 12609
12610 Hãfez	2551 P-L	Schamsoddin Mohammed Hãfez (1324–1390) was a Persian poet. Hãfez means "a person who knows The Koran by heart". He wrote in Persian and Arabic. When the Mongolians came to Persia they respected Hãfez. His lyric poetry is admired in Europe, and it influenced Goethe in his West-östlicher Divan.	JPL · 12610
12611 Ingres	2555 P-L	Jean Auguste Dominique Ingres, 18th–19th-century French painter	JPL · 12611
12612 Daumier	2592 P-L	Honoré Daumier, 19th-century French painter and lithographer	JPL · 12612
12613 Hogarth	4024 P-L	William Hogarth, 18th-century English painter and copper-plate engraver	JPL · 12613
12614 Hokusai	4119 P-L	Katsushika Hokusai, 18th–19th-century Japanese wood-carver and painter	JPL · 12614
12615 Mendesdeleon	4626 P-L	Pablo Mendes de Leon (born 1954) has directed the International Institute of Air and Space Law since its creation in 1985 and is a recognized expert in the field. He was recently appointed professor of Air and Space Law at the University of Leiden and delivered his inaugural lecture on 2009 Apr. 17	JPL · 12615
12616 Lochner	4874 P-L	Stephan Lochner, 15th-century German painter of the Cologne school	JPL · 12616
12617 Angelusilesius	5568 P-L	Angelus Silesius (Johannes Scheffler), 17th-century German baroque poet	JPL · 12617
12618 Cellarius	6217 P-L	Andreas Cellarius (c. 1596–1665), a German schoolmaster from Neuhausen near Worms, settled in Amsterdam in the early 1620s, becoming rector of the Latin School in Hoorn in 1637. His Harmonia Macrocosmica, published 1660 in Amsterdam, ranks amongst the most spectacular celestial atlases of the seventeenth century	JPL · 12618
12619 Anubelshunu	6242 P-L	Anu Belshunu (249 B.C.-c. 185 B.C.) was lamentation priest and interpreter of the astrological omen series Enuma Anu Enlil at the Temple of Anu in Uruk. A collection of astrological cuneiform tablets from his library contains some of the earliest realistic depictions of the Babylonian constellations	JPL · 12619
12620 Simaqian	6335 P-L	Sima Qian (c. 145 B.C.-c. 85 B.C.) was a Chinese historian, counselor and court astrologer of the Han emperor Wu Di. He wrote a treatise on the Chinese calendar. His Shiji ("Records of the Grand Historian") contains the earliest systematical description of the Chinese constellations	JPL · 12620
12621 Alsufi	6585 P-L	The Persian astronomer Abd al-Rahman al-Sufi (Azophi; 903–986) worked in Isfahan. His influential star atlas, completed around 964 and based on both Ptolemy's Almagest and pre-Islamic star lore, contains the earliest description of the Andromeda Galaxy, M 31	JPL · 12621
12622 Doppelmayr	6614 P-L	German mathematician, astronomer and cartographer Johann Gabriel Doppelmayr (1677–1750) worked in Nürnberg. His Atlas Coelestis, published in 1742, was one of the major celestial atlases of the eighteenth century	JPL · 12622
12623 Tawaddud	9544 P-L	A fictional character from the Arabian or 1001 Nights, Tawaddud was a talented slave-girl from Baghdad whose knowledge of astronomy, medicine and theology was superior to that of the best scholars in the court of Caliph Harun al-Rashid (who ruled from 786 to 809). The name was suggested by R. H. van Gent	JPL · 12623
12624 Mariacunitia	9565 P-L	Maria Cunitia (c. 1604–1664), the daughter of a Polish physician, taught herself astronomy, mathematics, medicine and history. In 1650 she published the Urania Propitia, a collection of astronomical tables based on Kepler's Rudolphine Tables. The name was suggested by R. H. van Gent	JPL · 12624
12625 Koopman	9578 P-L	Elizabetha Koopman (1647–1693), daughter of a Dutch merchant, was the second wife of Polish astronomer Johannes Hevelius. She assisted her husband with his astronomical observations, and after his death in 1687 she prepared his star atlas and catalogue for publication. The name was suggested by R. H. van Gent	JPL · 12625
12626 Timmerman	1116 T-1	Petronella Johanna de Timmerman (1724–1786), a Dutch poet who was educated in astronomy and mathematics at the observatory of Jan de Munck in Middelburg. In 1769 she married the Utrecht astronomer Jan Frederik Hennert and assisted him in his work. The name was suggested by R. H. van Gent	JPL · 12626
12627 Maryedwards	1230 T-1	Mary Edwards (c. 1750–1815), of Ludlow, Shropshire, was a skillful mathematical and astronomical computer. From 1773 until her death she performed most of the astronomical computations necessary for the preparation of the Nautical Almanac. The name was suggested by R. H. van Gent	JPL · 12627
12628 Acworthorr	2120 T-1	Mary Acworth Orr (1867–1949), wife of the solar physicist and Kodaikanal Observatory director John Evershed, in 1913 published a detailed study of the numerous astronomical allusions in the works of the Italian poet Dante Alighieri. The name was suggested by R. H. van Gent	JPL · 12628
12629 Jandeboer	2168 T-1	Jan Allard de Boer (born 1943) has been secretary of the Royal Dutch amateur society for meteorology and astronomy (NVWS) since 1995. He has done much to initiate contact between amateurs and professionals. Name suggested by A. v. d. Brugge and H. van Woerden	JPL · 12629
12630 Verstappen	3033 T-1	René Verstappen (born 1948) has been comptroller of the Dutch center for dissemination of information on astronomy, space science and meteorology for 36 years. He has done much for Dutch amateur astronomers. Name suggested by A. v. d. Brugge and H. van Woerden	JPL · 12630
12631 Mariekebaan	3051 T-1	Marieke Baan (born 1961), a Dutch public information officer. In 2005 she became press officer of the Dutch Research School for Astronomy. As such, she promotes astronomy through press releases, media events, educational activities and other forms of public outreach.	JPL · 12631
12632 Mignonette	3105 T-1	Mignonette Saavedra (born 1931), Chilean psychologist, studied at Smith College and Yale. In her professional life she put emphasis on neuro-psychology. She retired from the chair of the Psychology department at the University of Chile, Santiago in 2007.	JPL · 12632
12633 Warmenhoven	3119 T-1	Adrie Warmenhoven (born 1961), Dutch astronomy popularizer and educator. He is director of the 18th-century mechanical Eise Eisinga Planetarium in Franeker, The Netherlands.	JPL · 12633
12634 LOFAR	3178 T-1	LOFAR (LOw-Frequency ARray), a novel radio telescope, proposed by Leiden astronomer George Miley and inaugurated in 2010.	JPL · 12634
12635 Hennylamers	4220 T-1	Henny Lamers (born 1941), a Dutch astrophysicist, studied the evolution and mass loss of the most massive stars. He also gave many dozens of popular astronomy lectures for a wide variety of audiences, including children.	JPL · 12635
12636 Padrielli	4854 T-1	Lucia Padrielli (1943–2003), an Italian radio-astronomer who was closely involved in the "northern cross" radio telescope and in VLBI observations. During her career sheparticipated actively in Italian research policy, and she was president of IAU Commission 40 (Radio Astronomy).	JPL · 12636
12637 Gustavleonhardt	1053 T-2	Gustav Leonhardt (1928–2012), Dutch harpsichord player and conductor. He was the founder of the Leonhardt Consort, dedicated to performing baroque music on period instruments. In 1971, together with N. Harnoncourt and his Concentus Musicus, Leonhardt initiated the first complete recording of Bach's Cantatas.	JPL · 12637
12638 Fransbrüggen	1063 T-2	Frans Brüggen (born 1934) is a Dutch recorder player and conductor. He was the founder of the Orchestra of the Eighteenth Century, which is dedicated to performing classical music as authentically as possible. In 2012 he was awarded the Edison Classical Music Award	JPL · 12638
12639 Tonkoopman	1105 T-2	Ton Koopman (born 1944) is a Dutch harpsichord player and conductor, specializing in Baroque music. He founded the Amsterdam Baroque Orchestra in 1979, and the Amsterdam Baroque Choir in 1993. With these ensembles, he has given renowned performances of Bach's St. Matthew's Passion	JPL · 12639
12640 Reinbertdeleeuw	1231 T-2	Reinbert de Leeuw (1938 - 2020), a Dutch conductor, pianist and composer, was devoted to performing and recording classical music composed after 1900, preferably in the presence of the composer. In 1974 he founded the Schoenberg Ensemble.	JPL · 12640
12641 Hubertushenrichs	1310 T-2	Hubertus Frederik Henrichs (born 1949), a Dutch astronomer.	JPL · 12641
12642 Davidjansen	1348 T-2	David Jona Jansen (born 1968), a Dutch astronomer in Leiden.	JPL · 12642
12643 Henkolthof	3180 T-2	Henk Olthof (born 1944), a Dutch astronomer from Groningen.	JPL · 12643
12644 Robertwielinga	3285 T-2	Robert Wielinga (born 1962) is a Dutch physics teacher, active amateur astronomer and popularizer of astronomy. He has been head of the public observatory Sonnenborgh in Utrecht, a member of the European Association for Astronomy Education (EAAE) and secretary of the EAAE Board.	JPL · 12644
12645 Jacobrosales	4240 T-2	Jacob Rosales (born 1967) of Jalisco, Mexico, and his son, Jacob (Coby) Rosales Chase (born 1996) by Daniel W. E. Green, a close family friend. Jacob senior is an expert musician and teacher, specializing in violin and other stringed instruments; Coby is a student at Case Western Reserve University.	JPL · 12645
12646 Avercamp	5175 T-2	Hendrick Avercamp (1585–1634), Dutch painter who specialized in painting the Netherlands in winter during the time that is now known as the Little Ice Age. Many of Avercamp's paintings feature people ice skating on frozen lakes. Name suggested by W. A. Fröger	JPL · 12646
12647 Pauluspotter	5332 T-2	Paulus Potter (1625–1654) was a Dutch Golden Age painter who painted mostly farm scenes and animals. His realistic paintings put the animals in the forefront so they contrasted against the background and give them a lively appearance. His most famous painting is The Young Bull (c. 1647). Name suggested by W. A. Fröger	JPL · 12647
12648 Ibarbourou	1135 T-3	Uruguayan poet and writer Juana Fernández Morales de Ibarbourou (1892–1979) was one of the most popular South American poets. Her poems are notable for her identification of her feelings with nature around her.	JPL · 12648
12649 Ascanios	2035 T-3	Ascanios, the son of Aeneas. He is also named Julus and became under this name the ancestor of the Julius family.	JPL · 12649
12650 de Vries	2247 T-3	Martien de Vries (born 1932) is a Dutch astronomer who was part of a small group who developed the first Dutch 1-m telescope on La Silla. His main area of focus was the development and adjustment of the photometer, which he himself used for infrared star measurements.	JPL · 12650
12651 Frenkel	2268 T-3	Daan Frenkel (born 1948) is a leading Dutch scientist who has contributed to the development of Monte Carlo and Molecular Dynamics simulation methods that led to a greater understanding of the phase behavior of molecular systems. He shed light on the state of carbon in stars and has launched the careers of many young researchers.	JPL · 12651
12652 Groningen	2622 T-3	Groningen is a city in north-east Netherlands. It is home to the Kapteyn Astronomical Institute of the University of Groningen.	JPL · 12652
12653 van der Klis	2664 T-3	Michiel van der Klis (born 1953) is a Dutch astronomer and expert on the properties of neutron stars and black holes. He discovered quasi-periodic oscillations in X-ray binaries. He is the former Director of the Anton Pannekoek Institute in Amsterdam, and the winner of the Bruno Rossi prize (1987) and the Spinoza award (2004).	JPL · 12653
12654 Heinofalcke	4118 T-3	Heino Falcke (born 1966) is a German radio astronomer working in Nijmegen (Netherlands), known for his innovative use of radio telescopes and his work on the Galactic Centre black hole. He received the Spinoza award in 2011.	JPL · 12654
12655 Benferinga	5041 T-3	Ben Feringa (born 1951) is a renowned Dutch chemist, who won the 2016 Nobel Prize in Chemistry for the development of molecular machines. He is a passionate lecturer and public advocate for science.	JPL · 12655
12656 Gerdebruijn	5170 T-3	Ger de Bruijn (1948–2017) was a renowned Dutch radio astronomer who worked at Dwingeloo and Groningen. His expertise was key to the scientific and technical success of both the Westerbork Synthesis Radio Telescope and LOFAR.	JPL · 12656
12657 Bonch-Bruevich	1971 QO_{1}	Aleksej Mikhajlovich Bonch-Bruevich (born 1916), a corresponding member of the Russian Academy of Sciences.	JPL · 12657
12658 Peiraios	1973 SL	Peiraios, son of Klytios, was a friend of Telemachos.	JPL · 12658
12659 Schlegel	1973 UR_{5}	The brothers August Wilhelm (1767–1845) and Friedrich (1772–1829) Schlegel, both famous writers, philologists and teachers at the University of Jena.	JPL · 12659
12661 Schelling	1976 DA_{1}	Friedrich Wilhelm Joseph von Schelling (1775–1854), professor of philosophy in University of Jena.	JPL · 12661
12663 Björkegren	1978 RL_{7}	the family Björkegren, friends and neighbours of the discoverer's summer house on Gotland	JPL · 12663
12664 Sonisenia	1978 SS_{5}	Sonya (Sofiya) and Senya (Semen) are charming and talented children of Mark Ziselevich Orlovskij, Kiev journalist, executive in the publishing trade and friend of the discoverer.	JPL · 12664
12665 Chriscarson	1978 VE_{7}	Christopher A. Carson (born 1968) is the "Observatory (Spacecraft) Manager" of the Lucy mission.	IAU · 12665
12666 Mikeauldridge	1978 XW	Mike Auldridge, American resophonic guitar player and founding member of the renowned bluegrass group, the Seldom Scene.	IAU · 12666
12668 Scottstarin	1979 MX_{1}	Scott Robin Starin (born 1975) is the "Guidance, Navigation, and Control Systems Engineer" of the Lucy mission.	IAU · 12668
12669 Emilybrisnehan	1979 MY_{5}	Emily Walters Brisnehan (born 1987) is the "Instrument Accommodations Systems Engineer" of the Lucy mission.	IAU · 12669
12670 Passargea	1979 SG_{2}	Michael Paul Oskar Passarge (born 1950), a prominent German amateur astronomer.	JPL · 12670
12671 Thörnqvist	1980 FU	Owe Thörnqvist (born 1929), a singer-songwriter who has written a large number of songs, many about life in Uppsala, where he was born.	JPL · 12671
12672 Nygårdh	1980 FY_{2}	Hans Cristian Nygårdh (born 1950) is one of the most prolific compilers of cross-words in Sweden.	JPL · 12672
12673 Kiselman	1980 FH_{3}	Dan Kiselman (born 1963), a solar physicist, who was for many years the secretary of the Swedish Astronomical Society.	JPL · 12673
12674 Rybalka	1980 RL_{2}	Anatolij Nikolaevich Rybalka (born 1939), an obstetrician and gynaecologist, professor at the Crimean Medical University.	JPL · 12674
12675 Chabot	1980 TA_{4}	Anthony Chabot (1813–1888), one of the pioneering hydraulic engineers of the late nineteenth century and a developer of municipal water facilities.	JPL · 12675
12676 Dianemerline	1981 DU_{1}	Diane Elizabeth Miller Merline (born 1959) is an administrative coordinator for the Lucy mission.	IAU · 12676
12677 Gritsavage	1981 EO_{4}	Anthony Thomas Gritsavage (born 1974) is the "Lead Quality Engineer" of the Lucy mission.	IAU · 12677
12678 Gerhardus	1981 EQ_{20}	Joerg Gerhardus (born 1968) is the "Payload Safety and Mission Assurance Manager" of the Lucy mission.	IAU · 12678
12679 Jamessimpson	1981 EK_{22}	James Edward Simpson (born 1970) is the "L'Ralph Instrument Project Manager" of the Lucy mission.	IAU · 12679
12680 Bogdanovich	1981 JR_{2}	Carrie C. L. Bogdanovich, American amateur astronomer who assisted in organizing the photographic glass plate archive of the 1.2-m Schmidt Oschin Telescope at Palomar Observatory	JPL · 12680
12681 Pevear	1981 UL_{29}	Kristina Pevear (born 1982) is the "Systems Engineering Verification Engineer" of the Lucy mission.	IAU · 12681
12682 Kawada	1982 VC_{3}	Kawada Oukou (1830–1896), a Japanese classical scholar born in Tamashima, Okayama prefecture.	JPL · 12682
12686 Bezuglyj	1986 TT_{11}	Michail Yur'evich Bezuglyj (born 1963), a Ukrainian surgeon.	JPL · 12686
12687 de Valory	1987 YS_{1}	Guy Louis Henri, Marquis de Valory (1692–1774), was a French aristocrat, well known from his friendship with Voltaire. He became an ambassador for the Prussian King Frederic II.	JPL · 12687
12688 Baekeland	1988 CK_{4}	Leo Baekeland, Belgian-American chemist †	MPC · 12688
12690 Kochimiraikagaku	1988 VG_{1}	Kochi-Mirai-Kagakukan (Kochi city future science museum) is to be built in the heart of the city and will open in 2017. It will be equipped with a planetarium and is expected to play a role in astronomy education for children.	JPL · 12690
12694 Schleiermacher	1989 EJ_{6}	Friedrich Daniel Ernst Schleiermacher (1768–1834), German philosopher and Protestant theologian. He worked in Halle and Berlin. He contributed to theology, ethics, science, hermeneutics and aesthetics. His main philosophical work is the Dialektik (1839), but he is also known for his translations of Plato.	JPL · 12694
12695 Utrecht	1989 GR_{3}	Utrecht is a city in the Netherlands renowned for its university and the Sonnenborgh Observatory. In 1945, the famous Flemish astronomer Marcel Minnaert introduced the discipline of solar spectroscopy there. In 2004 the city celebrated its 750th anniversary.	JPL · 12695
12696 Camus	1989 SF_{1}	Albert Camus, French novelist and essayist, known for his novels L'Etranger and La Peste. Camus won the 1957 Nobel prize for literature. He defended truth, moderation and justice, adhering to liberal humanism and rejecting the dogmatic aspects of both Christianity and Marxism.	JPL · 12696
12697 Verhaeren	1989 SK_{3}	Émile Verhaeren, the Belgian poet. Although writing exclusively in French, she took much inspiration from "Flanders Fields", glorifying the greatness of its painters and enjoying the pleasures of its common people. Other important themes in his work are human progress, the brotherhood of man and his love for his wife.	JPL · 12697

== 12701–12800 ==
back to top

Named minor planet	Provisional	This minor planet was named for...	Ref · Catalog
12701 Chénier	1990 GE	André Chénier (1762–1794), was a French poet who died on the scaffold. The son of a Greek mother and an atheist father, he was inspired by Lucretius' De rerum natura, Holbach's Système de la Nature and d´Alembert's Rêve to write his naturalistic poem Hermès.	JPL · 12701
12702 Panamarenko	1990 SR_{6}	Panamarenko (Henri Van Herwegen, born 1940) is a famous Belgian artist, well known for the construction of bizarre flying machines, the main theme for his work, in remembrance of the myth of Icarus. It remains a mystery whether his creations can actually fly.	JPL · 12702
12704 Tupolev	1990 SL_{28}	Andrey Nikolaevich Tupolev (1888–1972) is known worldwide as an airplane designer. More than 100 types of airplanes were created under his guidance, including the first passenger jet aircraft Tu–104. Among the many notable accomplishments of his airplanes was the flight from Moscow over the North Pole to the US in 1937.	JPL · 12704
12706 Tanezaki	1990 TE_{1}	Tanezaki is a beach on the eastern side of Urado Bay in Kōchi Prefecture. It is a beautiful parkland dotted with pine trees and a great place for swimming and relaxation for Kochi city residents.	JPL · 12706
12708 Van Straten	1990 UB_{4}	Henri Van Straten (1892–1944) is considered one of the greatest lithographers that Belgium ever produced. His work includes more than 900 prints, using several materials and exposing different themes.	JPL · 12708
12709 Bergen op Zoom	1990 VN_{4}	The Dutch city of Bergen op Zoom. The medieval city in the southern part of the Netherlands was a fortress held by the Geuzen during the Eighty Years' War. Unsuccessfully besieged by Farnese in 1587 and by Spinola in 1622, this famous rebellion is archived in the hymn Merck toch hoe sterck.	JPL · 12709
12710 Breda	1990 VQ_{5}	Breda, a city dating from 1252 in the southern part of The Netherlands, was captured in 1581 by the Spaniards during the Eighty Years' War. In 1590 the town fell again into the hands of Maurice of Nassau, using a handful of men hidden under the turf of a peat-boat.	JPL · 12710
12711 Tukmit	1991 BB	Tukmit from Native American mythology. He is the Father Sky, and with Tomaiyowit (11500 Tomaiyowit), bore the First People in the creation story of the Luiseño people, a tribe in San Diego County, California.	JPL · 12711
12714 Alkimos	1991 GX_{1}	Alcimus, mythological son of Ares, who was, together with Automedon, in charge of Achilles' horses during the Trojan War	JPL · 12714
12715 Godin	1991 GR_{2}	Louis Godin (1704–1760), French astronomer who proposed to send expeditions to the equator and the polar sea to measure in both places an arc of one degree in order to find out the true shape of the Earth; in 1753 he joined La Condamine and Bouguer on an expedition to Peru to do this very thing	JPL · 12715
12716 Delft	1991 GD_{8}	Delft, Netherlands. The city dating from 1246 is famous for its blue pottery, its typical Dutch canal system and its highly esteemed University of Technology.	JPL · 12716
12718 Le Gentil	1991 LF_{1}	Guillaume Le Gentil (1725–1792) was a French astronomer who discovered several deep-sky objects. He traveled to India to observe the transits of Venus in 1761 and 1769. After his return to France in 1771, he published the Voyage dans les Mers de l´Inde, which contains a wealth of data on natural sciences.	JPL · 12718
12719 Pingré	1991 LP_{2}	Alexandre Guy Pingré (1711–1796), a French astronomer, was sent by the king to the isle of Rodrigue in the Indian Ocean to observe the transit of Venus in 1761. Pingré is particularly known from his two-volume Traité historique et théorique des comètes (1783–1784).	JPL · 12719
12722 Petrarca	1991 PT_{1}	Francesco Petrarca (1304–1374), an Italian poet famous for his Sonnets (1327–1374), which were dedicated to his muse, Laura. He was born in Arezzo and died in the Euganean Hills. Petrarca may be regarded as one of the greatest scholars of his age. His critical spirit made him the founder of Renaissance humanism.	JPL · 12722
12727 Cavendish	1991 PB_{20}	Henry Cavendish (1731–1810) was a British eccentric and physicist. In 1798 he successfully determined the universal constant of gravitation using an apparatus with two small lead spheres, attached on a fiber, and two large lead spheres, by measuring the angular deflection of the fiber.	JPL · 12727
12729 Berger	1991 RL_{7}	Hans Berger (1873–1941) was a German medical doctor and professor of neurology and psychiatry in Jena. He invented the electroencephalograph, placing electrical recording equipment on the surface of the skull.	JPL · 12729
12734 Haruna	1991 UF_{3}	Haruna Takahashi (born 1994), the eldest daughter of Japanese co-discoverer Atsushi Takahashi	JPL · 12734
12738 Satoshimiki	1992 AL	Satoshi Hayakawa (born 1992) and Miki Hayakawa (born 1995) are children of the second discoverer and partners in his observations.	JPL · 12738
12742 Delisle	1992 OF_{1}	Joseph-Nicolas Delisle (1688–1768), was a French astronomer who went to Russia, where he founded the observatory of St. Petersburg. His brother, Guillaume Delisle (1675–1726), reformed French cartography by introducing a method for fixing positions by astronomical observation.	JPL · 12742
12745 Kazujinishimura	1992 UL_{2}	Kazuji Nishimura, Japanese amateur astronomer living in Higashiyamato City, Tokyo.	IAU · 12745
12746 Yumeginga	1992 WC_{1}	The name Yumeginga is derived from the nickname of the Space and Science Museum in Takeo, Saga prefecture. "Yume" means "dream", and "ginga" means "galaxy". Yumeginga will be celebrating its tenth anniversary in July 2009	JPL · 12746
12747 Michageffert	1992 YN_{2}	Michael Geffert (born 1953) is a German astrometrist at Bonn University working on the precession of stars in globular clusters. He has done valuable work on the Hipparcos input catalog. He is also a discoverer of minor planets. Src	JPL · 12747
12749 Odokaigan	1993 CB	Odokaigan is a beach on the Otsuki Peninsula at the south-western tip of Shikoku, Japan.	JPL · 12749
12750 Berthollet	1993 DJ_{1}	Claude-Louis Berthollet (1748–1822), a French chemist who analyzed ammonia and prussic acid. However, his greatest contributions to chemistry were his studies on chemical affinity and his discovery of the reversibility of reactions (Essai de statique chimique, 1830).	JPL · 12750
12751 Kamihayashi	1993 EU	Kamihayashi, Niigata prefecture, Japan. From its mountains to its coastline, Kamihayashi features an abundance of natural topography.	JPL · 12751
12752 Kvarnis	1993 FR_{35}	Kvarnis is the nickname of a school in Uppsala's Kvarngärdet district which hosts a scale model of the Saturnian moon Enceladus, as part of Sweden's Solar System	JPL · 12752
12753 Povenmire	1993 HE	Katie Povenmire, an observer of meteor showers, lunar grazes and minor-planet occultations for determining a body's diameter together with her husband Hal Povenmire. By profession, Katie is a coronary critical care nurse (Src)	MPC · 12753
12755 Balmer	1993 OS_{10}	Johann J. Balmer (1825–1898), a Swiss mathematician and high-school teacher who examined the four visible lines in the spectrum of the hydrogen atom. By playing around with the numbers of their wavelengths, he finally put all four wavelengths into one equation, i.e., Balmer's formula.	JPL · 12755
12757 Yangtze	1993 RY_{11}	Yangtze River in China. It is the third longest river in the world. With its source at the base of several glaciers in the eastern part of the Qinghai-Tibet Plateau, the river has great importance for understanding the cultural origins of South China. Humans have lived in the region for at least 27000 years.	JPL · 12757
12758 Kabudari	1993 SM_{3}	Kabudari ("big tree" in Arawak), a native name from Palavecino, Lara, Venezuela	JPL · 12758
12759 Joule	1993 TL_{18}	James Joule (1818–1889), an English physicist who attempted to demonstrate the unity of forces in nature. In 1840 he determined the mechanical equivalent of heat and showed that heat is produced by motion.	JPL · 12759
12760 Maxwell	1993 TX_{26}	James Clerk Maxwell (1831–1879), was a Scottish mathematician and physicist, working in the discipline of electromagnetism. In A treatise on Electricity and Magnetism (1873), the Maxwell equations appear for the first time. He suggested that the rings of Saturn are composed of small individual particles.	JPL · 12760
12761 Pauwels	1993 TP_{38}	Thierry Pauwels (born 1957/58), Belgian astronomer, astrometrist, and a discoverer of minor planets at the Uccle Observatory	JPL · 12761
12762 Nadiavittor	1993 UE_{1}	Nadia Vittor (1949–1989), aunt of astronomer Alberto Toso, one of the uncredited discoverers of the staff at Farra d'Isonzo Observatory	MPC · 12762
12766 Paschen	1993 VV_{4}	Louis Paschen (1865–1947), a German physicist and an outstanding spectroscopist	JPL · 12766
12769 Kandakurenai	1994 FF	Kurenai Kanda (born 1952), Japanese actress and professional storyteller, member of the executive board of the Japan Space Forum.	JPL · 12769
12771 Kimshin	1994 GA_{1}	Kim Shin (born 1955), Japanese musician and synthesizer performer, whose compact disc Everlasting Space traveled into space with the shuttle Discovery in 2000	JPL · 12771
12773 Lyman	1994 PJ_{10}	Theodore Lyman (1874–1954), an American physicist who discovered, in 1906, a group of lines in the spectrum of the hydrogen atom that now bears his name. In 1970, a lunar crater was named after him by the IAU.	JPL · 12773
12774 Pfund	1994 PH_{22}	August Hermann Pfund (1879–1949), an American physicist and professor of optics at Baltimore University. He predicted correctly the very far infrared spectrum of the hydrogen atom (the Pfund series).	JPL · 12774
12775 Brackett	1994 PX_{22}	Frederick Sumner Brackett (1896–1988), an American physicist who predicted the far-infrared lines of the hydrogen spectrum	JPL · 12775
12776 Reynolds	1994 PT_{31}	Osbourne Reynolds (1842–1912), was a British engineer and physicist known for his work in fluid dynamics. He is remembered for the Reynolds' number (1883), which is defined by the difference between laminar and turbulent flow. He wrote a remarkable book: The Sub-mechanics of the Universe (1903).	JPL · 12776
12777 Manuel	1994 QA_{1}	Manuel Antolini (1959–2002), the son of the first discoverer, Plinio Antolini.	JPL · 12777
12780 Salamony	1995 CE_{1}	Sandra Noel Salamony (born 1962), American creative director for Sky Publishing (Sky & Telescope, Night Sky, Beautiful Universe)	JPL · 12780
12782 Mauersberger	1995 ED_{9}	Brothers Rudolf (1889–1971) and Erhard (1903–1982) Mauersberger were renowned German musicians and choirmasters.	JPL · 12782
12787 Abetadashi	1995 SR_{3}	Tadashi Abe (born 1943), a Japanese amateur astronomer who published a number of scientific papers and a thesis based on his discoveries.	JPL · 12787
12788 Shigeno	1995 SZ_{3}	Toramatsu Shigeno (1898–1986), Japanese amateur astronomer, and father-in-law of the discoverer, Tomimaru Okuni	JPL · 12788
12789 Salvadoraguirre	1995 TX	Salvador Aguirre (born 1952) is an avid amateur astronomer from Hermosillo, Mexico. He has conducted many observations of variable stars, asteroid occultations, meteors and comets. He has also helped popularize and coordinate amateur astronomical research within Mexico	JPL · 12789
12790 Cernan	1995 UT_{2}	Gene Cernan (1934–2017), American astronaut and commander of the Apollo 17 mission. He was the 11th person to walk on the Moon.	JPL · 12790
12793 Hosinokokai	1995 UP_{8}	Hoshinokokai is a star-loving group that has been working voluntarily for 20 years at the astronomical observatory on Tawara Junior High School in Utsunomiya City, Tochigi Prefecture.	JPL · 12793
12796 Kamenrider	1995 WF	Kamen Rider, a Japanese TV character, played by Hiroshi Fujioka, is a cyborg and a lover of justice. Ninety-eight stories of Kamen Rider were broadcast from 1971 to 1973. His fighting action and heroic stories fascinated all boys in Japan, including the discoverer.	JPL · 12796
12799 von Suttner	1995 WF_{6}	Bertha von Suttner (1843–1914), Austrian novelist and one of the first notable woman pacifists. She is credited with influencing Alfred Nobel in the establishment of the Nobel Prize for Peace, of which she was the recipient in 1905.	JPL · 12799
12800 Oobayashiarata	1995 WQ_{7}	Arata Oobayashi (1957–1999), a Japanese amateur astronomer and computer engineer. He was also famous as a photographic artist, leaving excellent astronomical photographs. The name was suggested by M. Namiki.	JPL · 12800

== 12801–12900 ==
back to top

Named minor planet	Provisional	This minor planet was named for...	Ref · Catalog
12801 Somekawa	1995 XD	Somekawa Shuichi (1962–1997), a Japanese amateur astronomer and optical engineer	JPL · 12801
12802 Hagino	1995 XD_{1}	Hagino Akira (1949–1999), Japanese amateur astronomer who died in an accident while observing. He worked as an instructor of popular astronomy at a small astronomical facility in Yamanashi prefecture and inspired many children and visitors with interests in the wonderful night sky.	JPL · 12802
12810 Okumiomote	1996 BV	Okumiomote (奥三面), a Japanese archaeological site in northern Niigata prefecture, which was submerged by the damming of a river in 2000	JPL · 12810
12811 Rigonistern	1996 CL_{7}	Mario Rigoni Stern (1921–2008), was an Italian writer, who was born and lived in Asiago. He is known for his poetry and novels about mountain life and habitat. Stern's work has been translated into more than a dozen languages and has won several national and international awards.	MPC · 12811
12812 Cioni	1996 CN_{7}	Giovanni Cioni (1943–2002) was an amateur astronomer of the Montelupo Group	JPL · 12812
12813 Paolapaolini	1996 CU_{8}	Paola Paolini (1947–2002) was the wife of Mauro Gherardini, amateur astronomer of the Montelupo Group	JPL · 12813
12814 Vittorio	1996 CG_{9}	Vittorio Beltrami (1926–2012) continuously promoted, supported and encouraged scientific and technological initiatives, in particular at the Belgirate Asteroids-Comets-Meteors Congress in 1993, and also during international events involving space and astronomy, with special attention to minor bodies of the solar system	JPL · 12814
12817 Federica	1996 FM_{16}	Federica Mula (born 1995) is the talented daughter of Manuela Sciascia and Nuccio Mula. In the opera Empedocle from Mula-Portera (Agrigento, 2002), she performed the role of the girl who found and returned the sandal of Greek philosopher Empedocles near the Etna volcano	JPL · 12817
12818 Tomhanks	1996 GU_{8}	Tom Hanks (born 1956), American actor who starred in such films as Splash, Sleepless in Seattle, Apollo 13 and Saving Private Ryan, winning Oscars for his roles in Philadelphia and Forrest Gump. He was executive producer for the miniseries From the Earth to the Moon, which dramatized the Apollo expeditions to the moon.	MPC · 12818
12819 Susumutakahasi	1996 JO	Susumu Takahasi (born 1958), director of the Dynic Astronomical Observatory "Tenkyukan", is ardent about astronomical education and a fine observer of variable stars	JPL · 12819
12820 Robinwilliams	1996 JN_{6}	Robin Williams (1951–2014), was an actor and a comedian whose television series Mork and Mindy launched his successful career in improvisational comedy and film. He starred in Good Morning Vietnam and Mrs. Doubtfire, as well as in Good Will Hunting, for which he won an Academy Award.	JPL · 12820
12823 Pochintesta	1997 AP	Alberto E.C. Pochintesta (1909–1984) was a Uruguayan astronomer and school teacher who worked at the Observatorio de Montevideo (X50).	JPL · 12823
12828 Batteas	1997 AU_{9}	Frank Batteas (born 1955) is a pilot for the F/A–18 and C–17 flight research projects at NASA's Dryden Flight Research Center, Edwards, California. He has accumulated more than 4700 hours of flight experience in more than 40 different types of aircraft	JPL · 12828
12833 Kamenný Újezd	1997 CV_{1}	The Czech village of Kamenný Újezd	MPC · 12833
12834 Bomben	1997 CB_{13}	Craig R. Bomben (born 1962) is a pilot in the Flight Crew Branch of NASA's Dryden Flight Research Center, Edwards, California. He has more than 17 years and 3800 hours of flight experience in over 50 different aircraft types	JPL · 12834
12835 Stropek	1997 CN_{13}	Václav Stropek (born 1938) has been a long-time technician at the Klet Observatory.	JPL · 12835
12838 Adamsmith	1997 EL_{55}	Adam Smith, 18th-century key figure of the Scottish Enlightenment, author of An Enquiry into the Nature and Causes of the Wealth of Nations	JPL · 12838
12840 Paolaferrari	1997 GR_{5}	Paola Ferrari, Librarian of the town of San Marcello Pistoiese in Italy and contributor to the Pian dei Termini Observatory	MPC · 12840
12843 Ewers	1997 GH_{27}	Richard G. Ewers (born 1946) is a pilot in the Flight Crew Branch of NASA's Dryden Flight Research Center, Edwards, California. He has more than 32 years and nearly 9000 hours of flight experience in all types of aircraft.	JPL · 12843
12845 Crick	1997 JM_{15}	Francis Crick (1916–2004) was a British scientist who proposed, together with J. D. Watson, the double-helical structure for DNA in 1953. Subsequently, a general theory for the structure of small viruses was worked out. He has also investigated the nature of consciousness in The astonishing hypothesis (1994).	JPL · 12845
12846 Fullerton	1997 MR	C. Gordon Fullerton (born 1936) is a research pilot at NASA's Dryden Flight Research Center, Edwards, California. With over 15~000 hours of flying time, he has piloted 135 different types of aircraft. He has logged 382 hours in space as a NASA astronaut, during two Space Shuttle missions	JPL · 12846
12848 Agostino	1997 NK_{10}	Agostino Boattini (born 1932) is the father of the discoverer	JPL · 12848
12850 Axelmunthe	1998 CO_{3}	Axel Munthe (1857–1949), a descendant of a Flemish family that settled in Sweden during the sixteenth century, was a physician and writer who had studied neurology under Charcot. In his autobiographical The story of San Michele (1929), he portrayed the foibles of the rich and the poor in a tragicomic fashion	JPL · 12850
12852 Teply	1998 FW_{30}	Grant Teply, an American ISEF awardee in 2002 † Archived 2009-02-08 at the Wayback Machine	MPC · 12852
12855 Tewksbury	1998 HS_{32}	Carolyn Morgan Tewksbury, an ISEF awardee in 2002	MPC · 12855
12856 Autridas	1998 HH_{93}	Autri Das, 2019 Broadcom MASTERS finalist for her chemistry project	IAU · 12856
12857 Johandemessie	1998 HQ_{97}	Johan DeMessie, 2019 Broadcom MASTERS finalist for his environmental and earth sciences project	IAU · 12857
12859 Marlamoore	1998 KK_{1}	Marla H. Moore (born 1940), a staff member at NASA's Goddard Space Flight Center, is known worldwide for her studies of the irradiation of ices and the implications of the irradiation processes for interstellar grains, comets, and icy satellites. The name was suggested by M. F. A'Hearn.	JPL · 12859
12860 Turney	1998 KT_{32}	Shannon Quinn Turney, an ISEF awardee in 2002	MPC · 12860
12861 Wacker	1998 KW_{33}	David "Buzz" Wacker, an ISEF awardee in 2002	MPC · 12861
12863 Whitfield	1998 KE_{48}	Meghan Elizabeth Whitfield (born 1985), an ISEF awardee in 2002	JPL · 12863
12864 Ryandrake	1998 KB_{55}	Ryan Drake, 2019 Broadcom MASTERS finalist for his environmental and earth sciences project	IAU · 12864
12866 Yanamadala	1998 KL_{65}	Vijay Yanamadala, an ISEF awardee in 2002	MPC · 12866
12867 Joëloïc	1998 LK_{2}	Joël (born 1982) and Loïc (born 1985) are the children of Gérard Faure, accountant, amateur astronomer and active Magnitude Alert Project observer of minor planets. Both sons are now students at the University of Grenoble, in the disciplines of economy and computer science	JPL · 12867
12868 Onken	1998 MZ_{7}	Christopher S. Onken (born 1979) was a summer student at the Lowell Observatory in 1998. As an observer, he made the first LONEOS near-earth-asteroid discovery and suggested many useful improvements to the observing protocol	JPL · 12868
12869 Ejiaga	1998 MR_{32}	Lauren Ejiaga, 2019 Broadcom MASTERS finalist for her plant science project	IAU · 12869
12870 Rolandmeier	1998 MK_{37}	Roland C. Meier (born 1964), of Gretag Imaging, Zurich, is well known for his research on the chemistry of comets, ranging from studies of the chemistry observed in situ at 1P/Halley with Giotto to numerous optical and radio studies using ground-based telescopes. The name was suggested by M. F. A'Hearn	JPL · 12870
12871 Samarasinha	1998 ML_{37}	Nalin Samarasinha (born 1958), a Sri Lanka planetary scientist and discoverer of minor planets of the National Optical Astronomy Observatories, Tucson, has carried out many studies of the dynamical evolution of cometary nuclei and the related dynamical processes of dust in cometary comae. This includes his demonstration of the excited rotational state of 1P/Halley.	JPL · 12871
12872 Susiestevens	1998 OZ_{5}	Susie Stevens, American teacher, 2002 winner of an Intel Foundation Excellence in Teaching Award	MPC · 12872
12873 Clausewitz	1998 OU_{7}	Carl von Clausewitz (1780–1831) was a Prussian general and intellectual who gained extensive combat experience by fighting against the armies of the French Revolution and Napoleon. His famous book Vom Kriege ("On War") is considered one of the most influential works of military philosophy in the Western world.	JPL · 12873
12874 Poisson	1998 QZ	Siméon Denis Poisson (1781–1840) was a prolific French mathematician and inspiring teacher who left his mark on many branches of applied mathematics, including electricity and magnetism, celestial mechanics and elasticity. His name is also associated with the Poisson distribution in probability theory.	JPL · 12874
12876 Estrada	1998 QR_{10}	Paula Estrada, 2019 Broadcom MASTERS finalist for her plant science project	IAU · 12876
12877 Rylangardner	1998 QF_{11}	Rylan Gardner, 2019 Broadcom MASTERS finalist for his physics project	IAU · 12877
12878 Erneschiller	1998 QH_{11}	Ernest Schiller, American teacher, 2002 winner of an Intel Foundation Excellence in Teaching Award	MPC · 12878
12880 Juliegrady	1998 QM_{25}	Julie Grady, American teacher, 2002 winner of an Intel Foundation Excellence in Teaching Award	MPC · 12880
12881 Yepeiyu	1998 QF_{31}	Ye Peiyu, Chinese teacher, 2002 winner of an Intel Foundation Excellence in Teaching Award	MPC · 12881
12883 Gassler	1998 QY_{32}	Alaina Gassler, 2019 Broadcom MASTERS finalist for her electrical and mechanical engineering project	IAU · 12883
12885 Hannahguan	1998 QM_{34}	Hannah Guan, 2019 Broadcom MASTERS finalist for her medicine and health sciences project	IAU · 12885
12891 Kassandraholt	1998 QH_{51}	Kassandra Holt, 2019 Broadcom MASTERS finalist for her materials & bioengineering project	IAU · 12891
12893 Mommert	1998 QS_{55}	Michael Mommert (born 1982) has analysed Herschel and Spitzer space telescope observations of transneptunian and near-Earth objects, finding further evidence for links between these populations. He has provided insight into the physical properties of the Plutinos and the cometary component of the NEO population.	JPL · 12893
12895 Balbastre	1998 QO_{99}	Claude-Bénigme Balbastre (1729–1799) was a French composer who, after writing more-or-less academic organ work at Dijon, blossomed as a fashionable Parisian harpsichord teacher and cosmopolite. La Lugeac and La d´Héricourt rank among the very finest keyboard works of the 1750s	JPL · 12895
12896 Geoffroy	1998 QV_{102}	Étienne Geoffroy Saint-Hilaire (1772–1844), French naturalist who established in Philosophie anat-omique (2 volumes, 1818–1822) the principle of unity of organic composition among vertebrates (and later also invertebrates). Opposing Cuvier, Geoffroy's concepts created a receptive scientific audience for Darwin's evolution theory.	JPL · 12896
12897 Bougeret	1998 RY_{5}	Jean-Louis Bougeret (born 1945) is Director of the Laboratoire d´Etudes Spatiales et d´Instrumentation en Astrophysique at Paris Observatory. He is an expert in the solar wind and interplanetary medium, and is active in space research. The name was suggested by M. A. Barucci.	JPL · 12897
12898 Mignard	1998 RK_{6}	François Mignard (born 1949) is a French astronomer, former director of CERGA who has been involved with ESA's Hipparcos and Gaia missions.	MPC · 12898
12900 Rishabjain	1998 RP_{28}	Rishab Jain (born 2004) is an American youth inventor, who was an International Science and Engineering Fair and Broadcom MASTERS awardee.	JPL · 12900

== 12901–13000 ==
back to top

Named minor planet	Provisional	This minor planet was named for...	Ref · Catalog
12903 Isabellekatz	1998 RK_{57}	Isabelle Katz, 2019 Broadcom MASTERS finalist for her physics project	IAU · 12903
12906 Alexismacavoy	1998 RS_{72}	Alexis MacAvoy, 2019 Broadcom MASTERS finalist for her chemistry project	IAU · 12906
12907 Giannanilvo	1998 RV_{79}	Gianna Nilvo, 2019 Broadcom MASTERS finalist for her animal science project	IAU · 12907
12908 Yagudina	1998 SG_{25}	Eleonora Ivanovna Yagudina (born 1941) is a staff member at the Institute of Applied Astronomy of the Russian Academy of Sciences. She has worked extensively on the motions of solar system bodies, and devotes much of her time to educating young people in astronomy	JPL · 12908
12909 Jaclifford	1998 SK_{58}	Jack Clifford (born 1933), of Scottsdale, Arizona, is a pioneering cable television entrepreneur, avid amateur astronomer and a major contributor to numerous science and educational institutions. He has been of great service on the Lowell Trustee's advisory board, particularly in fundraising	JPL · 12909
12910 Deliso	1998 SP_{59}	Joseph John Deliso (1906–1994), contractor, manufacturer, public servant and philanthropist, served many years as Chairman of the Trustees of Springfield Technical Community College, Massachusetts, and was a major endower of that institution. The name was suggested by W. L. Putnam	JPL · 12910
12911 Goodhue	1998 SQ_{59}	Samuel Harlowe Goodhue (born 1921), engineer and alpinist of Jackson, New Hampshire, was Chairman of the Trails Committee and then the Huts Committee for the Appalachian Mountain Club. He has been generous with his time and talents to both the Mount Washington (meteorological) and Lowell observatories	JPL · 12911
12912 Streator	1998 SR_{60}	The US city of Streator, home town of Clyde W. Tombaugh (1906–1997), who discovered Pluto	JPL · 12912
12915 Rinoliver	1998 SL_{161}	Rinoa Oliver, 2019 Broadcom MASTERS finalist for her behavioral and social sciences project	IAU · 12915
12916 Eteoneus	1998 TL_{15}	Eteoneus, son of Boethous and King Menelaus of Sparta's weapon-carrier during the Trojan War, who helped Odysseus in his attempts to return home	JPL · 12916
12919 Tomjohnson	1998 VB_{6}	Thomas J. Johnson (born 1923) developed a technique for creating Schmidt telescope correctors that allowed the mass production of Schmidt-Cassegrain telescopes. In 1978 the Optical Society of America awarded him the David Richardson Medal for this work	JPL · 12919
12923 Zephyr	1999 GK_{4}	The word zephyr derives from the name of the ancient Greek god of the west wind, Zephyrus. The name was suggested by M. Smitherman	JPL · 12923
12924 Madisonicole	1999 RK_{21}	Madison Nicole Perkins, 2019 Broadcom MASTERS finalist for her environmental and earth sciences project	IAU · 12924
12926 Brianmason	1999 SO_{9}	Brian Harold Mason (1917–2009), New Zealand-born meteoriticist and lunar geologist	MPC · 12926
12927 Pinocchio	1999 SU_{9}	Pinocchio, character from Carlo Collodi's eponymous tale	MPC · 12927
12928 Nicolapozio	1999 SV_{9}	Nicola Pozio (born 1965), accountant for the Spaceguard Foundation	MPC · 12928
12929 Periboea	1999 TZ_{1}	Periboea was the grandmother of the Trojan ally Asteropaios and mother of Pelegon who she conceived by way of the river god Axius.	IAU · 12929
12931 Mario	1999 TX_{10}	Mario Sposetti (1916–1959), father of Swiss discoverer Stefano Sposetti	MPC · 12931
12932 Conedera	1999 TC_{12}	Marina Conedera (born 1962), wife of Swiss discoverer Stefano Sposetti	MPC · 12932
12933 Muzzonigro	1999 TC_{16}	Livio Muzzonigro (born 1932) an Italian teacher of mathematics and physics at Duca degli in Gorizia, who was a teacher of one of the discoverers of this minor planet at the Farra d'Isonzo Observatory.	IAU · 12933
12934 Bisque	1999 TH_{16}	Stephen Bisque (born 1960), Thomas Bisque (born 1963), Daniel Bisque (born 1965) and Matthew Bisque(born 1966). Since 1984, they have been developing and distributing software and instrumentation for the astronomical community that completely automates telescope control and CCD image acquisition.	JPL · 12934
12935 Zhengzhemin	1999 TV_{17}	Zheng Zhemin (born 1924), an academician of the Chinese Academy of Sciences and Engineering and a foreign academician of the U.S. National Academy of Engineering, is one of the founders of the field of explosion mechanics. A leader in the field of mechanics in China, he has proposed and created new branches of mechanics	JPL · 12935
12936 Glennschneider	2549 P-L	Glenn Schneider (born 1955), an American astronomer at the University of Arizona	JPL · 12936
12937 Premadi	3024 P-L	Premana W. Premadi (born 1964) is an astronomer at the ITB Observatorium Bosscha (Indonesia), an authority on cosmology, and teacher of theoretical astrophysics. Since 2005, she has been a member of the Universe Awareness (UNAWE) International Team, and is the founder and chair of UNAWE Indonesia (2007–2013).	JPL · 12937
12938 Ingakamp	4161 P-L	Inga Kamp (b. 1970) is a Dutch astronomer, specializing in astrochemistry and the formation of stars and planets. Since 2025, she has been director of the Kapteyn Astronomical Institute of the University of Groningen.	JPL · 12938
12939 Ignassnellen	4206 P-L	Ignas Snellen (b. 1970) is a Dutch astronomer, specializing in the study of exoplanets. Since 2022, he has been scientific director of Leiden Observatory. Ignas is a passionate communicator and often acts as an expert in Dutch national media.	JPL · 12939
12940 Gijsnelemans	4588 P-L	Gijs Nelemans (b. 1971) is a Dutch astronomer, specializing in the study of white dwarfs and gravitational waves. He is the great-grandson of Dutch astronomer Anton Pannekoek.	JPL · 12940
12941 Franssnik	4638 P-L	Frans Snik (b. 1979) is a Dutch astronomer, specializing in polarization measurements and instrumentation. He led a number of citizen science projects in the Netherlands, including iSpex, to measure aerosols.	JPL · 12941
12942 van der Marel	6054 P-L	Nienke van der Marel (b. 1986) is a Dutch astronomer, specializing in the study of planetary formation and protoplanetary disks. She has been active in outreach and communication since her student days.	JPL · 12942
12943 Selmademink	6670 P-L	Selma de Mink (b. 1983) is a Dutch astronomer, specializing in the study of giant stars. Since 2021, she has been a scientific director at the Max Planck Institute for Astrophysics in Garching near Munich, Germany.	JPL · 12943
12944 Robwalrecht	6745 P-L	Rob Walrecht (b. 1959) is a Dutch amateur astronomer, astronomy educator and astrocartographer. In particular, he designed and produced a wide range of high-quality planispheres for various target groups and geographical latitudes.	JPL · 12944
12945 Reynierpeletier	9534 P-L	Reynier Peletier (b. 1962) is a Dutch astronomer, specializing in the formation and evolution of galaxies. From 2011 to 2016, he was director of the Kapteyn Astronomical Institute of the University of Groningen.	JPL · 12945
12946 Portegieszwart	1290 T-1	Simon Portegies Zwart (b. 1965) is a Dutch astronomer, specializing in numerical studies of stellar dynamics. He leads the interdisciplinary research team on Computational Astrophysics at Leiden Observatory. Simon's main objective is to understand the universe through computer simulations.	JPL · 12946
12947 Paulgroot	3099 T-1	Paul Groot (b. 1971) is a Dutch astronomer, specializing in the study of astronomical transients. In 1997, he was co-discoverer of the first optical counterpart of a γ-ray burst. Paul is principal investigator of the BlackGEM Telescope Array at ESO’s La Silla Observatory.	JPL · 12947
12948 Nathaliedegenaar	4273 T-1	Nathalie Degenaar (b. 1980) is a Dutch astronomer, specializing in the study of neutron stars and black holes. She is an excellent communicator and frequently appears on podcasts, radio and TV.	JPL · 12948
12949 Milogrootjen	4290 T-1	Milo Grootjen (b. 1975) is a Dutch astronomer and astronomy communicator. Since 2019, he has been head of the Artis Planetarium in Amsterdam, part of the capital’s zoo.	JPL · 12949
12950 Michielrodenhuis	4321 T-1	Michiel Rodenhuis (b. 1971) is a Dutch experimental astrophysicist, specializing in astronomical polarimetry. Since 2022, he has been director of the Netherlands Research School for Astronomy.	JPL · 12950
12951 Koenkuijken	1041 T-2	Koen Kuijken (b. 1963) is a Belgian-Dutch astronomer, specializing in galaxy dynamics, gravitational lensing and dark matter. From 2007 to 2012 he was scientific director of Leiden Observatory. Koen was principal investigator of the cosmological Kilo-Degree Survey, carried out with ESO’s VLT Survey Telescope.	JPL · 12951
12952 Joerivanleeuwen	1102 T-2	Joeri van Leeuwen (b. 1975) is a Dutch radio astronomer, specializing in the study of pulsars and fast radio bursts. In his numerous outreach activities, he often targets young children.	JPL · 12952
12953 Jaapvreeling	1264 T-2	Jaap Vreeling (1956–2025) was a Dutch amateur astronomer, math teacher and astronomy communicator. He was one of the driving forces behind the Mobile Planetarium project of the Netherlands Research School for Astronomy. After his retirement he initiated the Lynch Planetarium on Sint Eustatius, the first planetarium in the Caribbean.	JPL · 12953
12954 Hendrikcasimir	2040 T-2	Hendrik Casimir (1909–2000) was a Dutch physicist who worked on topics in quantum mechanics and quantum electrodynamics. In 1948 he predicted the Casimir effect, an attractive force between two uncharged plates in a vacuum due to quantum fluctuations of the electromagnetic field.	JPL · 12954
12955 Alexdekoter	2162 T-2	Alex de Koter, Dutch astronomer.	IAU · 12955
12956 Ralphwijers	2232 T-2	Ralph Wijers (1964-2026) Dutch high-energy astrophysicist at the University of Amsterdam.	IAU · 12956
12972 Eumaios	1973 SF_{1}	Eumaeus (Eumaios), Odysseus's swineherd in Greek mythology. When Odysseus returned to Ithaca, Eumaios helped him to conquer the suitors of Penelope.	JPL · 12972
12973 Melanthios	1973 SY_{1}	Melanthius (Melanthios), Odysseus's goatherd in Greek mythology. He mocked Odysseus when the latter came to Eumaios disguised as a beggar. Later Odysseus killed him	JPL · 12973
12974 Halitherses	1973 SB_{2}	Halitherses, an Ithacan prophet in Greek mythology. He went together with Telemachos to search for Odysseus. He was also a friend of Odysseus himself.	JPL · 12974
12975 Efremov	1973 SY_{5}	Yurij Nikolaevich Efremov (born 1937), Russian astronomer and a leading research scientist at the Sternberg Astronomical Institute, Moscow University. His works on variable stars and star-formation regions are well known. He discovered the period-age relationship for Cepheids and created the concept of large complexes of young stars.	JPL · 12975
12976 Kalinenkov	1976 QK_{1}	Nikifor Dmitrievich Kalinenkov (1924–1996) was professor of physics and astronomy at the Nikolaev State Pedagogical Institute in Ukraine. He was the first director of the institute's astronomical observatory and contributed much to its instrumentation through "make-it-yourself" telescopes and other devices	JPL · 12976
12977 Nanettevigil	1978 NC	Nanette Vigil (born 1968), daughter of comet hunter David H. Levy.	JPL · 12977
12978 Ivashov	1978 SD_{7}	Vladimir Ivashov (1939–1995), a Russian Soviet actor who created a striking image of a defender of the motherland in the film Ballad of a Soldier produced by Grigorij Chukhraj	JPL · 12978
12979 Evgalvasilʹev	1978 SB_{8}	Evgenij Aleksandrovich Vasilʹev, Ukrainian educator, creator of the Artek pioneer camp "Lesnoj" in Crimea	JPL · 12979
12980 Pruetz	1978 VO_{3}	Todd Orville Pruetz (born 1968) is the "Science Communications Publisher" of the Lucy mission.	IAU · 12980
12981 Tracicase	1978 VP_{3}	Traci Case (born 1976) was a member of the Step-1 proposal team of the Lucy mission, as well as its "Cost, Schedule and Earned Value Lead, and Deputy Payload Manager" at the Southwest Research Institute.	IAU · 12981
12982 Kaseybond	1979 MS_{5}	Kasey J. Bond (born 1991) is a "Resource Analyst" of the Lucy mission.	IAU · 12982
12983 Mattcox	1979 OH_{1}	Matthew Anthony Cox (born 1966) is one of the "Spacecraft Program Manager" for the Lucy mission, leading the development team at Lockheed Martin.	IAU · 12983
12984 Lowry	1979 QF_{2}	Stephen C. Lowry (born 1976), Irish astronomer who performs precise observations of cometary nuclei to reveal their bulk properties. He also studies physical and chemical properties of near-earth objects.	MPC · 12984
12985 Mattgarrison	1980 UW_{1}	Matthew Brian Garrison (born 1983) is the "L'Ralph Instrument Systems Engineer" of the Lucy mission.	IAU · 12985
12986 Kretke	1981 DM_{2}	Katherine A. Kretke (born 1982) is an astrophysicist and the "communications and public engagement lead" of the Lucy mission.	IAU · 12986
12987 Racalmuto	1981 EF_{2}	Racalmuto is a town in Sicily with Greek and Roman origins. The municipal astronomical observatory promotes astronomical research and dissemination.	IAU · 12987
12988 Tiffanykapler	1981 EC_{5}	Tiffany L. Kapler (born 1977) is the "Public Outreach Specialist" of the Lucy mission.	IAU · 12988
12989 Chriseanderson	1981 EV_{9}	Chris Elaine Anderson (born 1957) is a typesetter and administrative assistant for the Lucy mission, who participated in the spacecraft's "Step-1 proposal" and the "Phase-A Concept Study Report".	IAU · 12989
12990 Josetillard	1981 EB_{17}	Jose P. Tillard (born 1976) is the "Risk Manager and Systems Engineer" of the Lucy mission.	IAU · 12990
12991 Davidgriffiths	1981 EN_{21}	David J. Griffiths (born 1961) is the "Flight Project Mechanical Systems and Solar Arrays Systems Engineer" of the Lucy mission.	IAU · 12991
12992 Crumpler	1981 EZ_{22}	Larry S. Crumpler (b. 1950), an American volcanologist and space scientist	IAU · 12992
12993 Luisafernanda	1981 EP_{27}	Luisa Fernanda Zambrano-Marin (born 1982), astronomer and educator at the Arecibo Observatory and founder of the Arecibo Observatory Science Academy	IAU · 12993
12994 Pitufo	1981 ET_{27}	Pitufo is the Spanish word for Smurf, the small, blue, human-like character created by Belgian cartoonist Pierre “Peyo” Culliford (1928–1992).	IAU · 12994
12995 Wendellmendell	1981 EY_{27}	Wendell W. Mendell (b. 1941), an American planetary scientist.	IAU · 12995
12996 Claudedomingue	1981 EV_{28}	Claude A. Domingue (b. 1935), a Canadian and American engineer.	IAU · 12996
12997 Lizjensen	1981 EV_{29}	Elizabeth A. Jensen (b. 1975), an American space scientist.	IAU · 12997
12998 Thomas-Keprta	1981 EB_{43}	Kathie L. Thomas-Keprta (b. 1957) has made major contributions to the study of extraterrestrial materials. Her research on magnetites found within the Martian meteorite ALH84001 revealed that they could be of biogenic origin.	IAU · 12998
12999 Toruń	1981 QJ_{2}	The Polish city of Toruń, birthplace of astronomer Nicolas Copernicus (1473–1543), whose Old Town is a UNESCO World Heritage Site and whose university houses the largest observatory in Poland	JPL · 12999

back to top

Preceded by 11,001–12,000	Meanings of minor-planet names List of minor planets: 12,001–13,000	Succeeded by 13,001–14,000
