= Bambang Hidayat =

Indonesian scientist

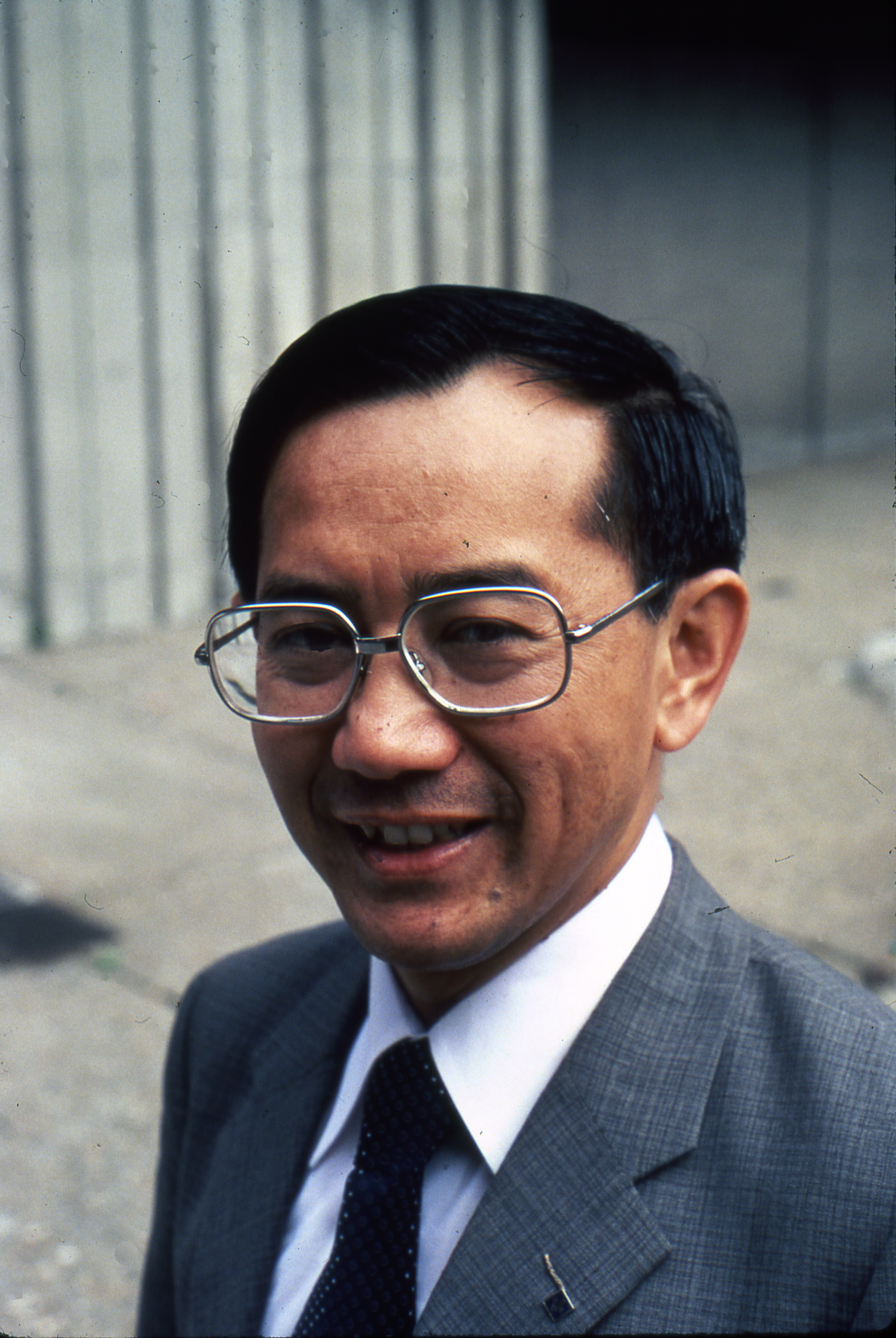
- Hidayat in 1979
- Born: 18 September 1934 (age 91); Kudus Regency, Central Java Indonesia
- Citizenship: Indonesian
- Education: Case Western Reserve University
- Scientific career
- Fields: Astronomy
- Workplaces: Bosscha Observatory; Bandung Institute of Technology; International Astronomical Union

Bambang Hidayat is an Indonesian scientist known for promoting astronomy nationally and internationally. His work has focused on the study of binary stars and galactic structure. The minor star Hidayat (3468 T-3), discovered in 1977, was named after him by Cornelis Johannes van Houten and Ingrid van Houten-Groeneveld. He has over forty papers published to his name and has written several astronomy textbooks.

He graduated from Case Western Reserve University in 1965. Soon thereafter, he served as the director of the Bosscha Observatory from 1968 until 1999. He also served as the Chairman of the Department of Astronomy at the Bandung Institute of Technology as well as Vice President of the International Astronomical Union from 1994 to 2000, and has been a fellow of the Islamic World Academy of Sciences (IAS) since 1992 He is also a member of the American Astronomical Society, Royal Astronomical Society, and Indonesian Academy of Sciences, as well as the founder of the Indonesian Astronomical Society and co-founder of the Indonesian Physics Society.

Hidayat helped to establish the first International School for Young Astronomers in Indonesia. When first visited by Donat Wentzel, himself a pioneer in establishing ISYAs, Hidayat was alone in his observatory; later, Wentzel found that Hidayat had trained a group of astronomy students to work around him as well as spurred others to work in astronomy and Indonesia's space program elsewhere.

== See also ==
- Meanings of minor planet names: 12001–13000#101
