= François Mignard =

French astronomer

François Mignard (born the 23rd of July 1949) is a French astronomer and the former director of the CERGA Observatory (French: Centre de recherches en géodynamique et astrométrie) of the Observatoire de la Côte d'Azur in southern France. He is an expert in space astrometry and Solar System dynamics, and played major roles in the European Space Agency's Hipparcos and Gaia missions.

== Training and Career ==
After is study's at the Normal Superior School (French: l'École Normale Supérieur) and at the University of Paris, François Mignard joined the CERGA in 1974, then integrated the CNRS as an associate professor in 1975. The same year, he defended his post-graduate thesis on the movement of a satellite with high eccentricity.

Mignard is an active member in several commissions of the International Astronomical Union and chairman of its working group that amends the standards for the International Celestial Reference System.

== Major contributions ==
François Mignard played a central role in the missions of space Astrometry of the European Space Agency especially Hipparcos and Gaia missions.

For the Gaia mission, launched in 2013, he was responsible of the European Data Processing and Analysis Consortium from 2006 to 2012 and is currently a member of Gaia Science Team of ESA, has the main researcher for the french participation.

== Awards and affiliations ==
In 2019, he was awarded by the Académie des Sciences the Centre National d'Études Spatiales (CNES) award in astrophysics and space sciences .

He also chaired at the Bureau des longitudes from 2020 to 2023 and is a member of the Académie de l'air et de l'espace and was elected member of the Académie des Sciences in December 2023.

== Honors ==
Asteroid 12898 Mignard, discovered by astronomers with the LONEOS program in 1998, was named in his honor. The official naming citation was published by the Minor Planet Center on 24 July 2002 (M.P.C. 46109).
