= Begas =

Begas is a surname of German origin. Notable people with the surname include:

- Carl Joseph Begas (1794–1854), German painter; father of Oskar, Reinhold, Adalbert and Karl Begas
- Oskar Begas (1828–1883), German painter and Professor at the Prussian Academy of Arts
- Reinhold Begas (1831–1911), German painter
- Adalbert Begas (1836–1888) German painter
- Karl Begas (1845–1916), German painter
